= Effects of Hurricane Helene in Georgia =

Hurricane Helene
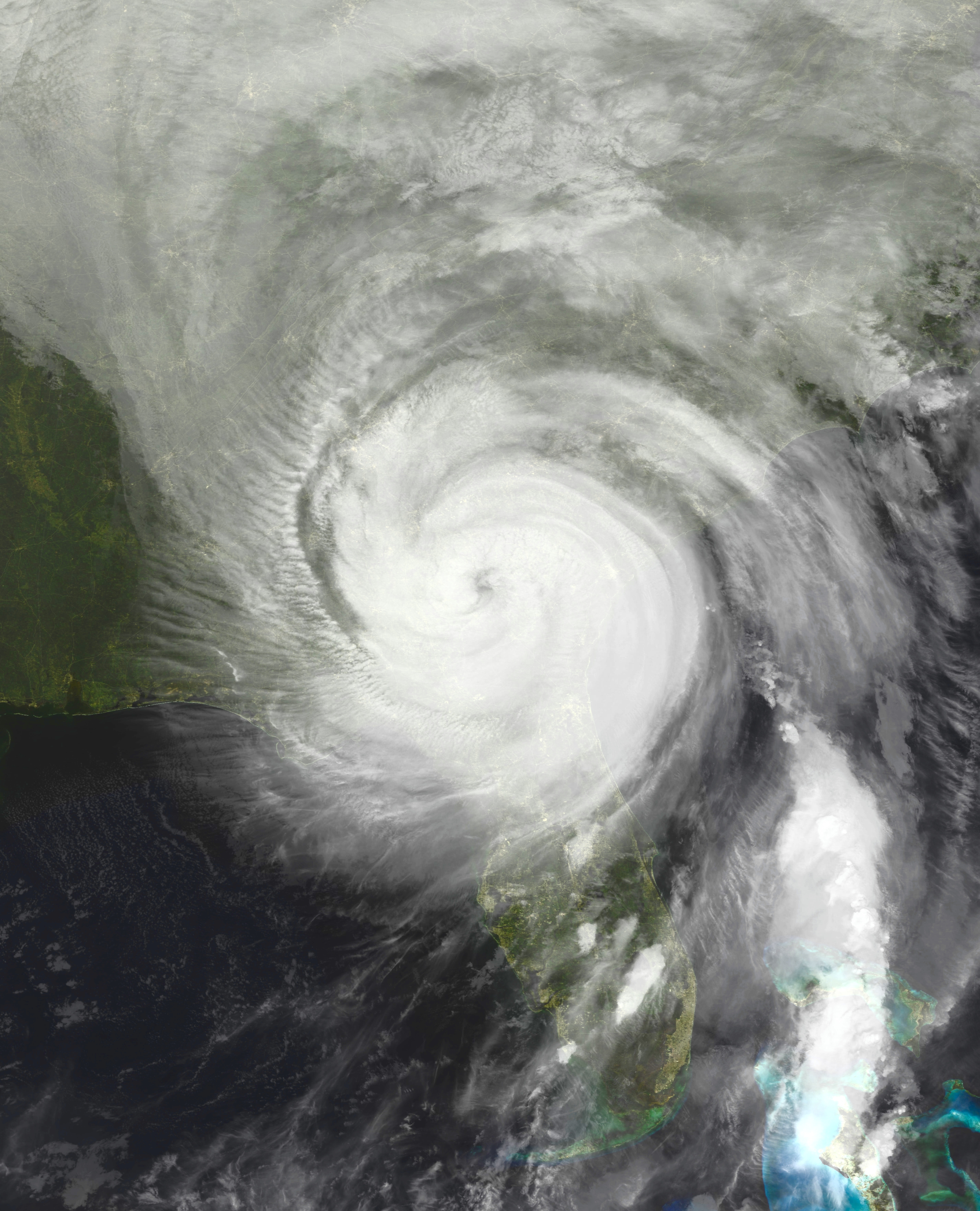
- Satellite image of Helene over south-central Georgia on September 27

Meteorological history
- Duration: September 26–27, 2024

Category 2 hurricane
- 1-minute sustained (SSHWS/NWS)
- Highest winds: 110 mph (175 km/h)
- Lowest pressure: 947 mbar (hPa); 27.96 inHg

Overall effects
- Fatalities: 37
- Damage: >$7 billion (2024 USD)
- Areas affected: Georgia
- Part of the 2024 Atlantic hurricane season
- Effects: Florida; Georgia; North Carolina; Related: Misinformation; Other wikis: Commons: Helene images

Georgia was severely impacted by Hurricane Helene during late September 2024, causing 37 deaths across the state. After making landfall in the Big Bend region of Florida on September 27, the hurricane crossed into Georgia as a Category 2 hurricane, bringing damaging winds and heavy rain to much of the state.

== Preparations ==
The coast of Georgia was placed under tropical storm warnings. In contrast, Southwest Georgia was placed under a hurricane warning which extended as far north into the state as Spalding County, Georgia, and all tropical storm watches in Georgia were replaced with tropical storm warnings as far north as the Tennessee and Georgia state border. The National Weather Service in Peachtree City accidentally issued a hurricane warning for Jackson County, Georgia when it was supposed to be a tropical storm warning.

In addition, on the night of September 26, an extreme wind warning was issued for portions of South Georgia, including Valdosta. On September 24, in preparation for Helene, officials in the counties of Bryan, Candler, and Chatham began mobilizing emergency response centers. Colquitt, Thomas, and Decatur counties opened shelters. That same day, Governor Brian Kemp issued a state of emergency for Georgia since Helene was expected to track into the state. In Thomas County, the Public Works Department began providing sandbags due to the storm.

On September 25, schools were closed in the counties of Bibb and Twiggs. Many schools in the Atlanta metro area canceled instruction for September 26 and 27, such as Atlanta Public Schools, with some counties moving students and non-essential workers online. Elsewhere, in Clayton County schools, indoor and outdoor athletic events were canceled. The Cumberland Island National Seashore and Fort Pulaski National Monument closed on September 25 in preparation for the hurricane. Several attractions in Atlanta were closed on September 26 and 27, including Zoo Atlanta and the Georgia Aquarium. Amtrak modified or canceled several of its southeastern train routes between September 27 and October 1 because of the storm.

The Atlanta Braves postponed the remaining two games in a series against the New York Mets to September 30 in a doubleheader. 45 high school football games which were originally scheduled for the week of September 30 – October 6 were postponed due to several school closures. Curfews were implemented by several localities on September 26. Emory University moved classes online for September 26 and 27, and the University of Georgia canceled classes entirely. Ahead of the storm, vice-presidential nominee JD Vance canceled two events on September 26 for the 2024 Trump–Vance campaign scheduled in Macon and Flowery Branch.

== Impact ==
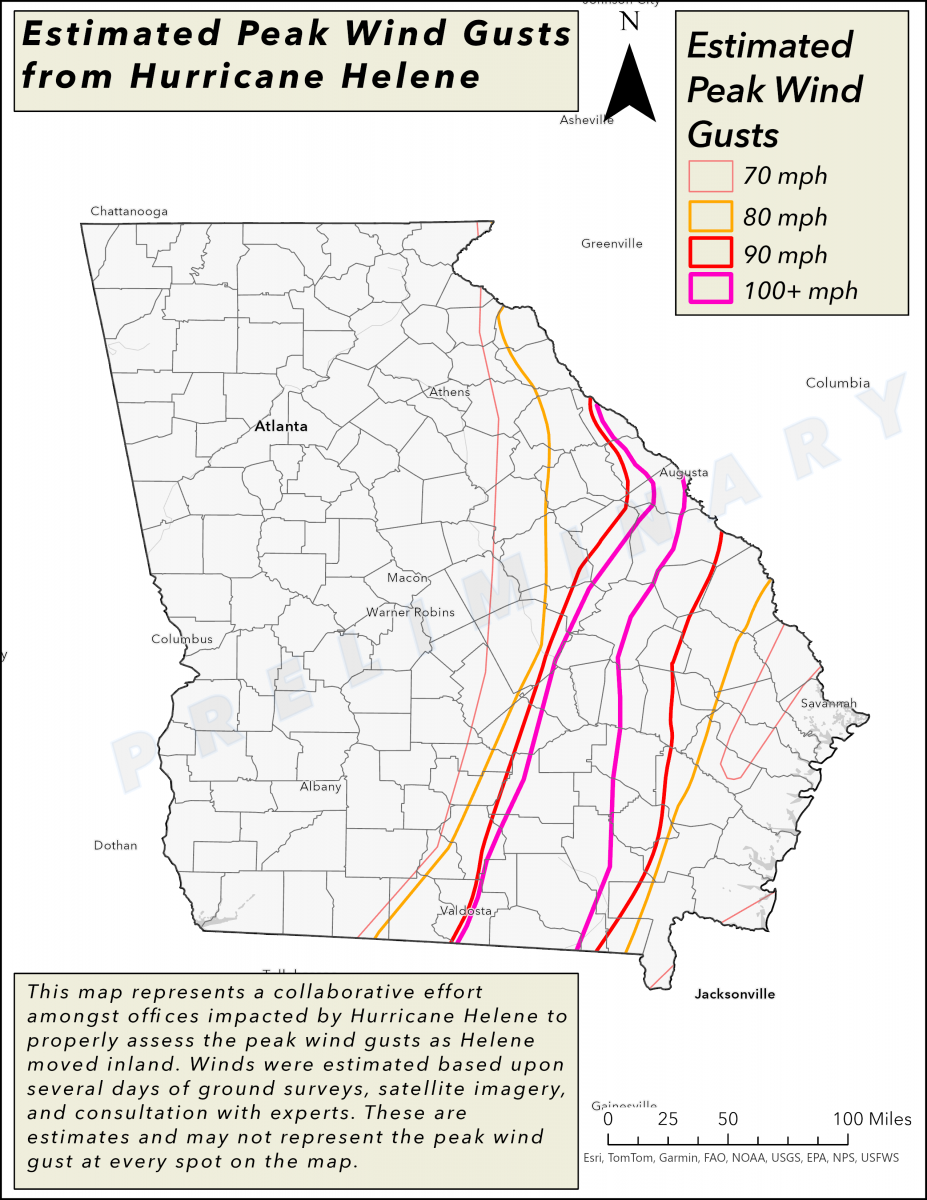
Swath of estimated peak wind gusts in Georgia from Helene

Injuries and deaths were reported throughout the state. Six people died in Richmond County from falling trees, and one person died indirectly in a car accident. Four people, a mother and her twin infants and another individual, died in McDuffie County. A person was killed in Colquitt County after their vehicle crashed into a fallen tree. Two deaths were reported in Laurens County when a person was killed by a tree falling on their house and the other person was killed in a car crash; and in Blackshear, a firefighter also died when a tree fell on their vehicle. In Jeff Davis County, two people were killed by falling trees. In Lowndes County, two people were killed by falling trees. In Liberty County, one person was killed after a tree fell onto a camper. Three people in Chatham County died following the storm due to improper use of a generator. In Washington County, a 4-year-old girl and a 7-year-old boy were killed while trapped inside their home due to a tree hitting the residence, starting a fire. In Columbia County, one person was killed after a tree fell onto their mobile home, and over 5000 homes in the county were damaged or destroyed. In Pierce County, a firefighter was killed after a tree fell on his vehicle. An EF1 tornado in Wheeler County resulted in two deaths when a trailer on SR 19 was picked up from a highway. One death occurred in Burke County due to a storm-related traffic accident. A woman in Clinch County was killed after a tree fell on her home. A man died in Lincoln County when a tree fell on his home. 212,747 homes in the state suffered some degree of damage. Property damage in the state totaled over $1.5 billion. Agricultural losses throughout the state are estimated to be over $5.5 billion, including $2.484 billion in direct losses. The lowest pressure recorded in the state was 946.8 mbar (27.96 inHg) in Quitman; this was the lowest pressure on record for the state of Georgia.

=== Piedmont ===
In Atlanta, the National Weather Service in Peachtree City issued the city's first-ever flash flood emergency due to Atlanta having its heaviest 3-day rainfall totals in 104 years. Rainfall totals over 48 hours in the city reached 11.12 in (282 mm), the most the city has seen in 48 hours since record keeping began in 1878. About 25 people had to be rescued from floods in Atlanta. Fox Weather meteorologist Bob Van Dillen was caught on live television saving a woman from her Toyota RAV4 with flood waters up to the windows. Localized urban flooding was also reported on multiple interstates like I-285, I-85, I-75 and many other interstate systems encompassing Atlanta. More significant flooding occurred in Buckhead due to overflowing of Peachtree Creek, which crested at a near-record height and flooded multiple surrounding apartment complexes. Other flooding occurred in areas around Metro Atlanta. DeKalb County emergency management received about 100 reports of downed trees and power lines. Several trees fell on buildings, and one car was crushed by a fallen tree. At Hartsfield–Jackson Atlanta International Airport, 79 departing flights and 92 arriving flights were canceled, with delays in the hundreds. All flights to Atlanta on American Airlines, Delta Air Lines, Frontier Airlines, Spirit Airlines and United Airlines were grounded, with Lufthansa, Air Canada and WestJet also grounding flights. In the northeast, Rabun County saw 14.64 inches of rain, the highest rainfall total in Georgia associated with Helene. In Jefferson County, Helene caused more than $75 million in timber damage and 24 homes were completely destroyed. A weather station near Louisville recorded a gust to 75 mph (121 km/h). The storm downed thousands of trees at Mount Vernon in Montgomery County.

Helene brought substantial wind damage to the Augusta metropolitan area, with damage in Richmond county estimated to be over $500 million in total. Sustained winds at Augusta Regional Airport reached 52 mph (84 km/h) before the site stopped reporting. Peak wind gusts were estimated to have exceeded 100 mph (160 km/h). In Augusta, Helene damaged thousands of trees leading to canopy loss of as much as 80% in some areas.

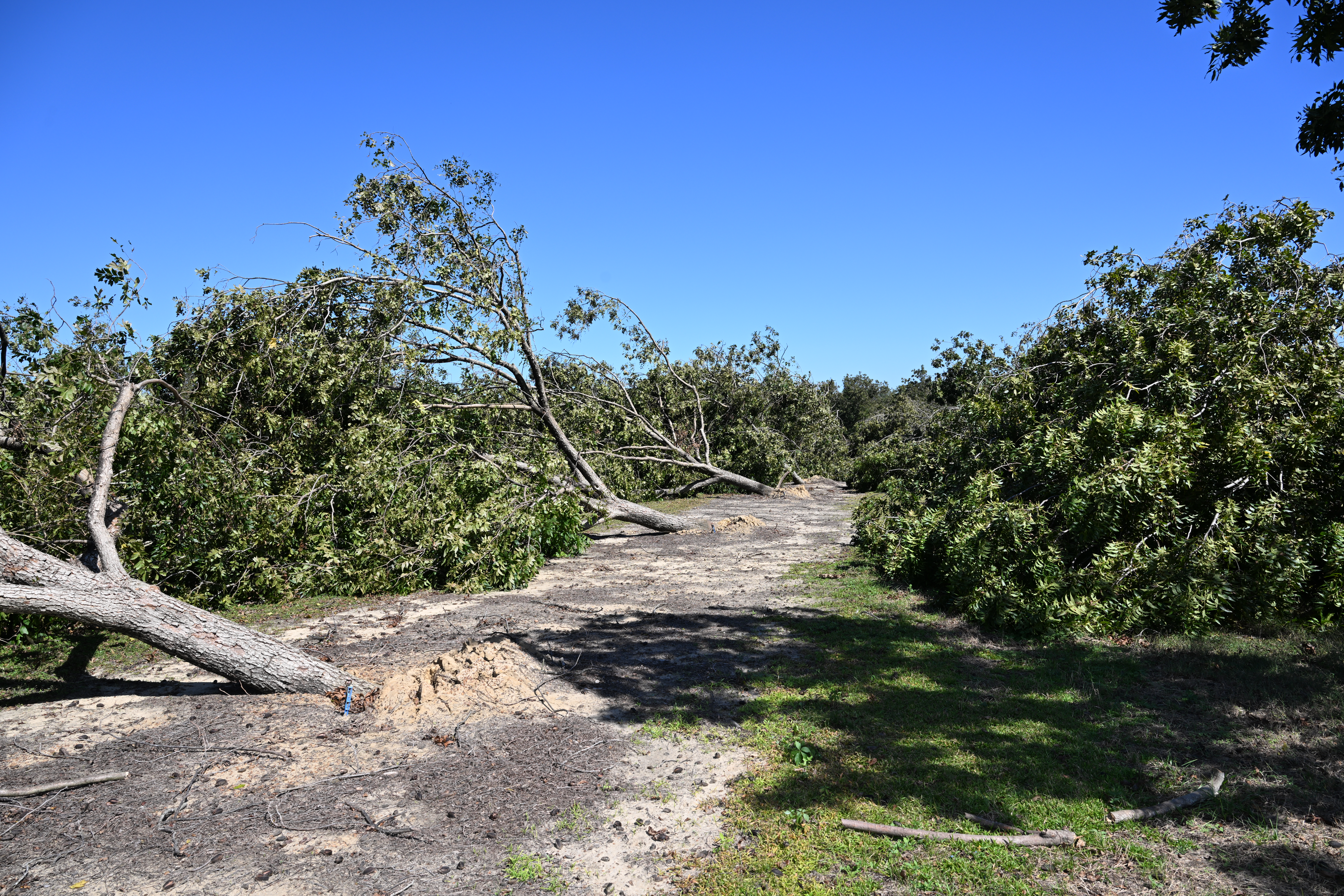
Uprooted pecan trees in Jenkins County.

=== Coastal Plain ===
During Helene, Bacon County saw gusts up to 100 mph (160 km/h). These winds caused at least 60% of the county to lose power. One home suffered severe damage after two trees fell through it. In total, at least two dozen homes suffered major damage in Bacon County.

The Golden Isles experienced tropical storm conditions due to Helene. In Brunswick, there were several reports of tree limbs damaging homes and businesses. A peak gust of 78 mph (126 km/h) was recorded in the region. In St. Simons, hundreds of trees were downed. One traffic-related fatality occurred in the portion of US 17 which passed through Glynn County. The Dora F, which was one of the oldest shrimp fishing vessels operating in the East Coast, broke free from its dock in the Brunswick River and sank.

In the town of Trinity, residents had no running water and no electricity. At the peak of the storm, around 90% of the county's roads were blocked. In Willacoochee, all of the entrances to the city were blocked. Two families were saved by officials after trees fell inside their homes and trapped them. Elsewhere, the main power line of SR 135 was damaged due to Helene. A peak gust of 53 mph (85 km/h) was recorded on 1:50 am EDT on the 27th at a Weatherstem site. All of Atkinson County's residents were without electricity, with 75% being without water. In total, just over 8 thousand people were affected by Helene.

In Columbus, a daily rainfall record was set with around 4 in (100 mm) of rain on September 26. Wind gusts in the city reached 38 mph (61 km/h), with gusts reaching 59 mph (95 km/h) in Macon, 76 mph (122 km/h) in Savannah, and 100 mph (160 km/h) in Augusta.

The storm brought elevated water levels to the East Coast of Georgia, peaking at 2.34 ft at Fort Pulaski.

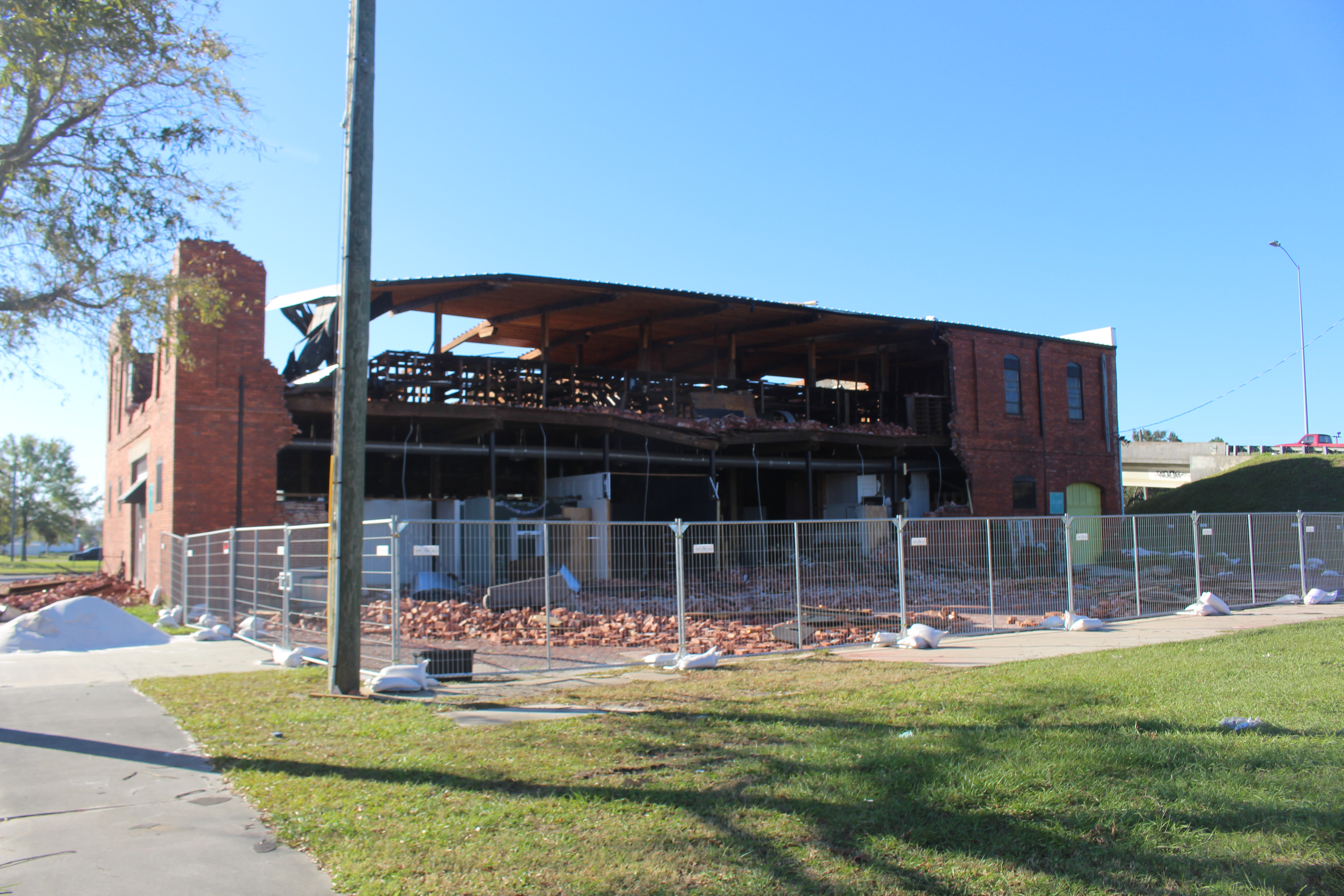
Building in Valdosta, Georgia destroyed by Hurricane Helene

=== South Georgia ===
Following the storm, hiking on the Appalachian Trail in Georgia was either banned or discouraged due to intense damage on the trail. Heavy damage also occurred in Chattahoochee-Oconee National Forest. Wind gusts in the northeast portion of the state were estimated to be at least 100 mph (160 km/h). In Lowndes County, property damage exceeded $500 million, with another $100 million in damage to crops. Extensive damage occurred across the county due to high winds and falling trees. A weather station near the Florida-Georgia border recorded a maximum gust to 96 mph (154 km/h), and another station in Valdosta recorded a gust to 83 mph (134 km/h). Strong winds heavily damaged at least 115 buildings in Valdosta. The Willis L. Miller Library suffered heavy damage, and the tower at Valdosta Regional Airport had all of its windows blown out. At Moody Air Force Base, more than 150 buildings sustained moderate to severe damage, mostly from high winds and tree debris near buildings. Damage to roofing and siding of some buildings led to interior water damage as well. Further north, Coffee County saw widespread wind damage and 1 fatality. Strong winds in Douglas damaged carports, blew off roofs, and destroyed mobile homes. Uprooted and snapped trees blocked roads and fell on buildings causing further damage. A weather station east of the city recorded a gust to 92 mph (148 km/h). Elsewhere in the county, an EF0 tornado felled trees and caused minor structural damage near Broxton and a shelter in Nicholls lost its roof. 80-85% of homes in the county were damaged.

== Aftermath ==
Power crews restored 95% of power outages within 8 days of the hurricane striking the state. The operation was considered the largest in Georgia Power's history. Power restoration in some areas took longer, with some residents still without power 20 days after the storm. In Savannah, 3 people died of carbon monoxide poisoning due to improper generator use.

President Joe Biden approved a major disaster declaration for the state on October 2, making federal funds available to residents and local governments in 11 counties. By November 4, this had been expanded to cover 95 counties. As of January 30, 2025, more than $283 million in assistance had been approved for Georgia households. On November 19, Georgia governor Brian Kemp wrote to congress requesting $12.2 billion in federal aid to assist Georgia's recovery efforts. This included requests for $6.46 billion to aid farmers and producers and $2.5 billion for housing recovery.

=== Political effects ===
When Donald Trump surveyed damage in the state on September 30, he falsely claimed that then-president Joe Biden didn’t contact governor Brian Kemp for federal assistance. He also criticized Harris’s absence from the state while she was campaigning in Las Vegas.

Despite disruptive voting registration across the state, a judge did not extend the registration deadline to vote past October 7.

Senator Jon Ossoff criticized Trump for refusing to extend the date for FEMA aid past 120 days, the way Trump did for Florida and South Carolina.

== See also ==
- List of Georgia hurricanes
