= Effects of Hurricane Helene in Florida =

Hurricane Helene
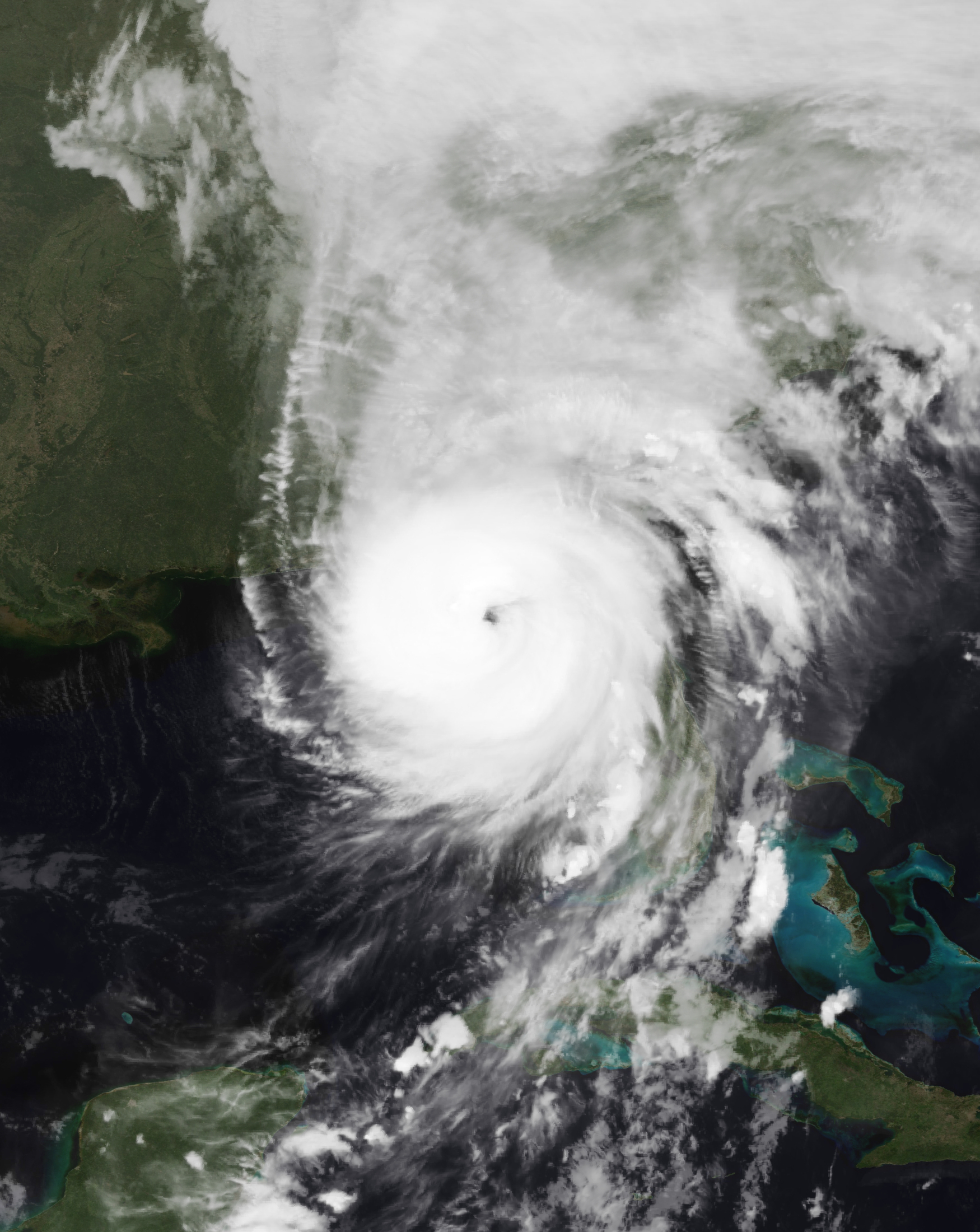
- Helene at peak intensity just prior to landfall in the Big Bend region of Florida on September 26

Meteorological history
- Duration: September 26–27, 2024

Category 4 major hurricane
- 1-minute sustained (SSHWS/NWS)
- Highest winds: 140 mph (220 km/h)
- Lowest pressure: 939 mbar (hPa); 27.73 inHg

Overall effects
- Fatalities: 34
- Damage: $13.9 billion (2024 USD)
- Areas affected: Florida
- Part of the 2024 Atlantic hurricane season
- Effects: Florida; Georgia; North Carolina; Related: Misinformation; Other wikis: Commons: Helene images

Hurricane Helene brought destructive effects to Florida. The eighth named storm, fifth hurricane and second major hurricane of the 2024 Atlantic hurricane season, Helene made landfall in Florida on September 26, bringing destructive effects across the state. Across Florida, Helene brought destructive winds and historic storm surge.

== Preparations ==
Hurricane warnings were issued for the Big Bend area of Florida, with nearly all of Florida, except the westernmost part of the Florida panhandle, put under a tropical storm warning. In addition, on the evening of September 26, an extreme wind warning was issued for the east part of the Florida Panhandle, the first since Hurricane Idalia. On September 23, Governor Ron DeSantis issued a state of emergency for 41 Florida counties. The next day, this was expanded to 61 counties. U.S. President Joe Biden authorized a federal disaster declaration for 61 counties across Florida. Locally, Volusia County issued a state of emergency. Several sandbagging sites opened up across the state. On September 24, several state parks were closed: four of them in Franklin County, two in Gulf County, and one in Gadsden County.

In the Tampa Bay area, officials announced that schools would be closed ahead of the storm. A college football game between Florida A&M University and Alabama A&M University, which was scheduled for the weekend of September 28–29, was postponed until November 29 due to the storm. At Florida State College at Jacksonville, classes and activities at the campus were canceled for two days. The SpaceX Crew-9 mission, which would have launched from the Cape Canaveral Space Force Station on September 26, was delayed to September 28 due to the storm. The Central Florida Zoo and Botanical Gardens planned to close on September 26 and canceled events on that date.

Mickey's Not-So-Scary Halloween Party was canceled due to Helene, with SeaWorld Orlando and several other parks in Walt Disney World and Universal Orlando also closing or modifying their hours. Halloween Horror Nights was also canceled. The universities of Central Florida, Embry–Riddle Aeronautical, Florida, Florida A&M, Florida Atlantic, Florida Gulf Coast, Florida State, Keiser, Lynn, North Florida, South Florida, and Stetson announced closures of their campuses and suspended academic operations. Leon County opened up schools to be used as shelters.

On September 24, Citrus County issued mandatory evacuations for Crystal River and Homosassa. In Wakulla County, a mandatory evacuation was ordered for all residents and visitors. In Hernando County, mandatory evacuations were ordered for residents west of US 19 and all residents living in manufactured homes. Two prisons in Wakulla County holding a combined 2,500 inmates were not evacuated despite the evacuation order issued to residents. Gulf County issued mandatory evacuations for all visitors. In Charlotte County and Franklin County, mandatory evacuations were issued for barrier islands, flood-prone areas, manufactured homes, and homes that did not meet building codes. In Sarasota County, officials issued an evacuation order for Level A and manufactured home communities on September 25.

Multiple Waffle Houses in Tallahassee and one in Crawfordville shut down, raising the Waffle House Index to red, indicating the possibility of severe damage to the restaurant. Orlando International Airport, remaining open, saw 65 cancellations on September 26, and 92 cancellations occurred at Miami International Airport. The Central Florida Pipeline, which supplies fuel used for jet planes between Tampa and Orlando, was reported to be damaged as a result taking on saltwater during Helene. The pipeline is the only direct source of new jet fuel to Orlando International Airport; the airport is instead relying on trucking in fuel and reserves Several national parks experienced service disruptions due to the hurricane, with all services suspended at Dry Tortugas National Park due to storm surge. The Taylor County Sheriff's Office posted to social media asking for those who did not evacuate to write their birthday and other important information on their bodies in permanent marker and to email the similar information and their location to them to help search and rescue teams.

Busch Gardens Tampa Bay, St. Pete–Clearwater International Airport, and Tampa International Airport were closed on September 26. Further north, Tallahassee International Airport was closed the same day. In Miami, parking garages open to allow residents to shield their vehicles from storm damage at no cost. Amtrak modified or canceled several of its southeastern train routes between September 27 and October 1 because of the storm.

== Impact ==
Most intense landfalling tropical cyclones in the U.S. state of Florida by central barometric pressure as of 2024
Rank	System	Season	Barometric pressure
1	"Labor Day"	1935	892 mbar (hPa)
2	Michael	2018	919 mbar (hPa)
3	Andrew	1992	922 mbar (hPa)
4	"Florida Keys"	1919	927 mbar (hPa)
5	"Okeechobee"	1928	929 mbar (hPa)
6	"Great Miami"	1926	930 mbar (hPa)
6	Donna	1960	930 mbar (hPa)
8	Irma	2017	931 mbar (hPa)
9	Helene	2024	939 mbar (hPa)
10	"Florida"	1948	940 mbar (hPa)
Source: HURDAT, Hurricane Research Division

Helene brought severe impacts across much of the gulf coast of Florida. About 1.3 million people lost power and 34 people were killed in the state.

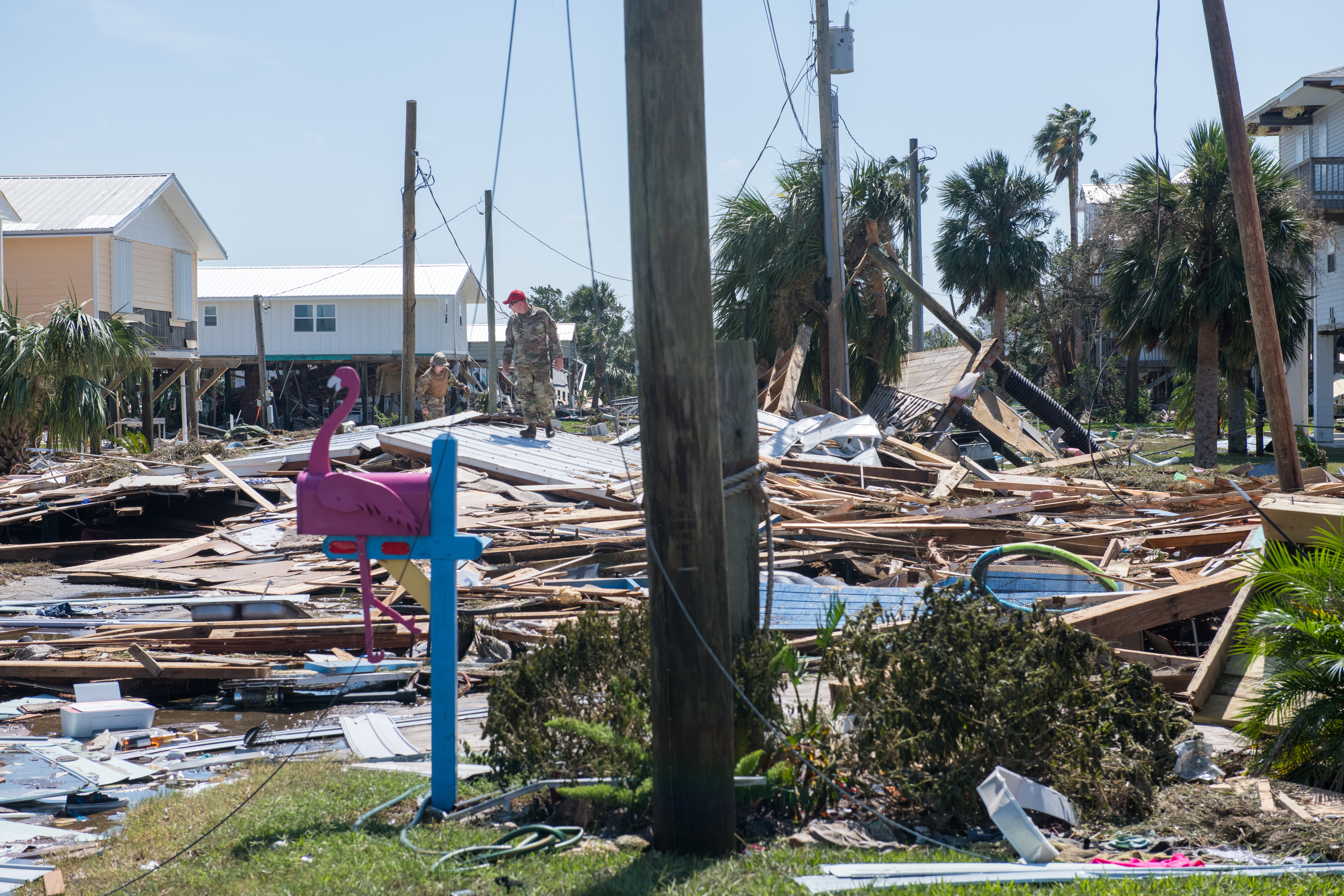
The Florida National Guard cleaning damage in Keaton Beach, Florida, following Helene

=== South Florida ===
==== Florida Keys ====
Helene brought minor impacts to the Florida Keys. Key West experienced storm surge of 1 to 3 feet (0.30 to 0.91 m). Winds from Helene were generally low-end tropical storm force, with sustained winds of 25 to 40 mph occurring across the area. The highest reported wind was a gust to 64 mph (103 km/h) near Key West. There were no reports of fatalities or serious injuries associated with the storm in the Keys.

==== Tampa Bay Region ====
In the Tampa Bay area, at least 17 people died due to Helene. 12 people were killed due to storm surge in Pinellas County and another 5 died directly and indirectly in Hillsborough County. By the morning of September 26, 2024, thousands in the Tampa Bay area were experiencing power outages. Wind gusts reached 64 mph (103 km/h) in Fort Lauderdale, 72 mph (116 km/h) at Opa Locka Airport, and 67 mph (108 km/h) in Naples. Storm surge reached 7.18 feet (2.19 m) in Tampa. Following the storm surge, multiple buildings in Clearwater Beach caught fire. At least 24 businesses and 70 homes were also destroyed in Gulfport. In all, over 29,000 business and residences were affected in Pinellas County, with over 17,000 being destroyed or suffering major damage. In Manatee County, 230,471 structures were affected, with residential damage estimated at $347.2 million, while commercial damage reached $6.3 million, for a combined total of $353.5 million. In Bradenton, 194 homes and seven commercial buildings suffered major damage, with the damage estimated at $41 million total. In total, across Manatee and Sarasota County, the damage is estimated at $1.1 billion, with $755.7 million in Sarasota County, 3,137 buildings are also damaged or destroyed in the county. In total, over 1,000 people had to be rescued in the Tampa Bay area.

=== Big Bend ===
Helene brought catastrophic damage to parts of the Big Bend region from both high winds and storm surge. Storm surge inundation of 12 to 16 feet occurred throughout much of the region, pushing entire homes off their foundations and into remote wetlands.

==== Tallahassee Metro ====
Property damage in Leon County was estimated to be at least $14 million. While Helene's strongest winds ultimately did not hit Tallahassee, the city still experienced tropical storm force winds, causing damage to trees and power lines. The Tallahassee International Airport reported sustained winds of 48 mph with a peak gust to 67 mph. In Gadsden County one person was injured due to a storm-related car accident. Jefferson County saw damage to numerous trees and power lines, causing at least $2.5 million in damage.

==== Coastal Big Bend ====
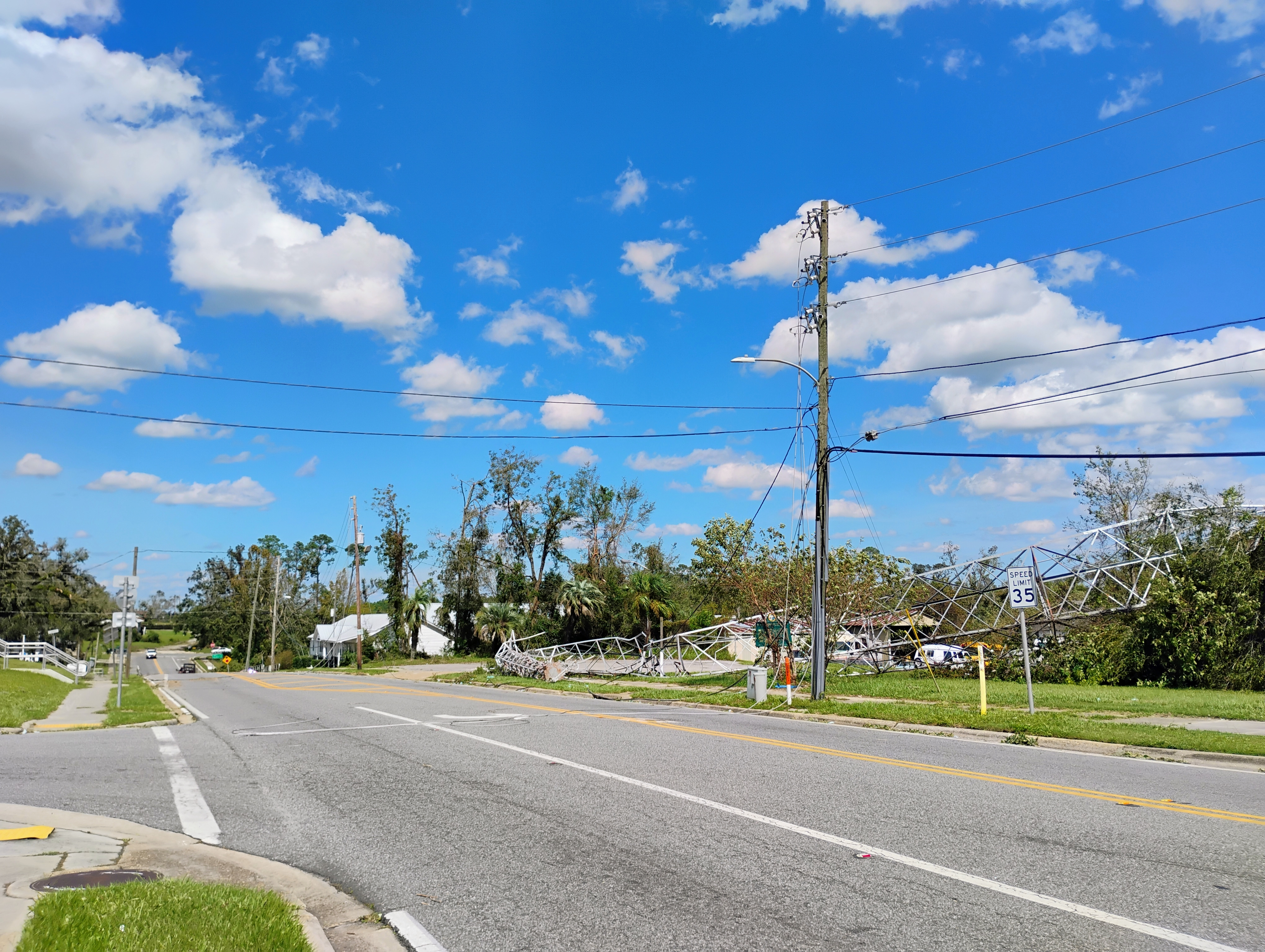
Tower in Madison, Florida brought down by Helene

Taylor County experienced high winds and high storm surge as Helene made landfall in the county. According to Taylor County sheriff Wayne Padgett, 90% of homes in Keaton Beach were destroyed. Storm surge in Steinhatchee reached 9.63 feet (2.94 m). Nearly 100% of the county lost power and heavy damage occurred to agriculture. Total damage in the inland and coastal areas of the county was estimated to be over $2 billion. Helene also brought damage to neighboring Dixie County. Storm surge in the area of Horseshoe Beach exceeded 15 feet, destroying 70% of the town. The community of Suwannee also saw significant damage from storm surge. 3 people were killed in the county, 1 from a falling tree and 2 others from cardiac arrest. Damage in the county was estimated to be over $1 billion. In Levy county, storm surge as high as 11 feet brought major damage to Cedar Key and Yankeetown.

==== Inland Big Bend ====
Inland counties in the big bend region were struck with major hurricane-force winds as Helene moved inland. The highest recorded sustained wind in the state was a 1-minute measurement of 74 mph by a 7.4 foot (2.25 m) National Wind Institute probe in rural Suwannee County. Many buildings in Live Oak had roof damage, and a Mesonet station near Dowling Park recorded a gust to 99 mph. High winds in Madison tore roofs off of buildings, downed trees and power lines, and brought down a tower. Property damage in Madison County amounted to over $1 billion.

=== Elsewhere ===
Pasco County Sheriff's Office rescued around 200 people in water emergencies. In Citrus County, over 100 people and 50 pets were rescued after ten feet of storm surge hit the area. In addition, rainfall totals in the county peaked at 2.66 in (68 mm) in Homosassa.

Despite not directly affecting Volusia County, gale-force gusts downed several trees, with a peak of 53 mph (85 km/h) in the county. More than 9,000 residents were without power as of September 27. In Edgewater, a carport blew over while a tree fell through the roof of a mobile home in the Sea Horse Mobile Home Park. A large tree fell into a duplex-style home through the roof in Seminole County, affected only by the storm's outer bands. Seminole County saw 2,427 people without power, while neighboring Orange County saw 4,476 customers without power. In Apopka, the outer bands tore the roof off of a home.

Elsewhere, in Flagler County, the highest gusts recorded were in Marineland, which had winds of 63 mph (101 km/h). Approximately 20,000 residents lost power from September 26 and 27. A tree fell through a roof at home in Palm Coast, while in Palm Beach, a "small scarp" received a local surge of 18 in (460 mm). The Stan Gober Memorial Bridge shut down due to flooding, and all sporting events in Collier County on September 27 were canceled.

== Aftermath ==
In the immediate aftermath of the storm, Governor Ron DeSantis distributed over 800,000 meals, a million liters of water, 28,000 bags of ice and 40,000 tarps to individuals in need. Volusia County also deployed 28 emergency responders. Holmes Beach banned tourists for 45 days after the hurricane.

Hurricane Milton also made landfall in Central Florida around two weeks later, complicating recovery from Helene and adding to the damage.

The state of Florida sued FEMA for failing to help victims affiliated with the Republican Party in the aftermath of Helene and Milton.
