= Hurricane Helene =

Category 4 Atlantic hurricane in 2024

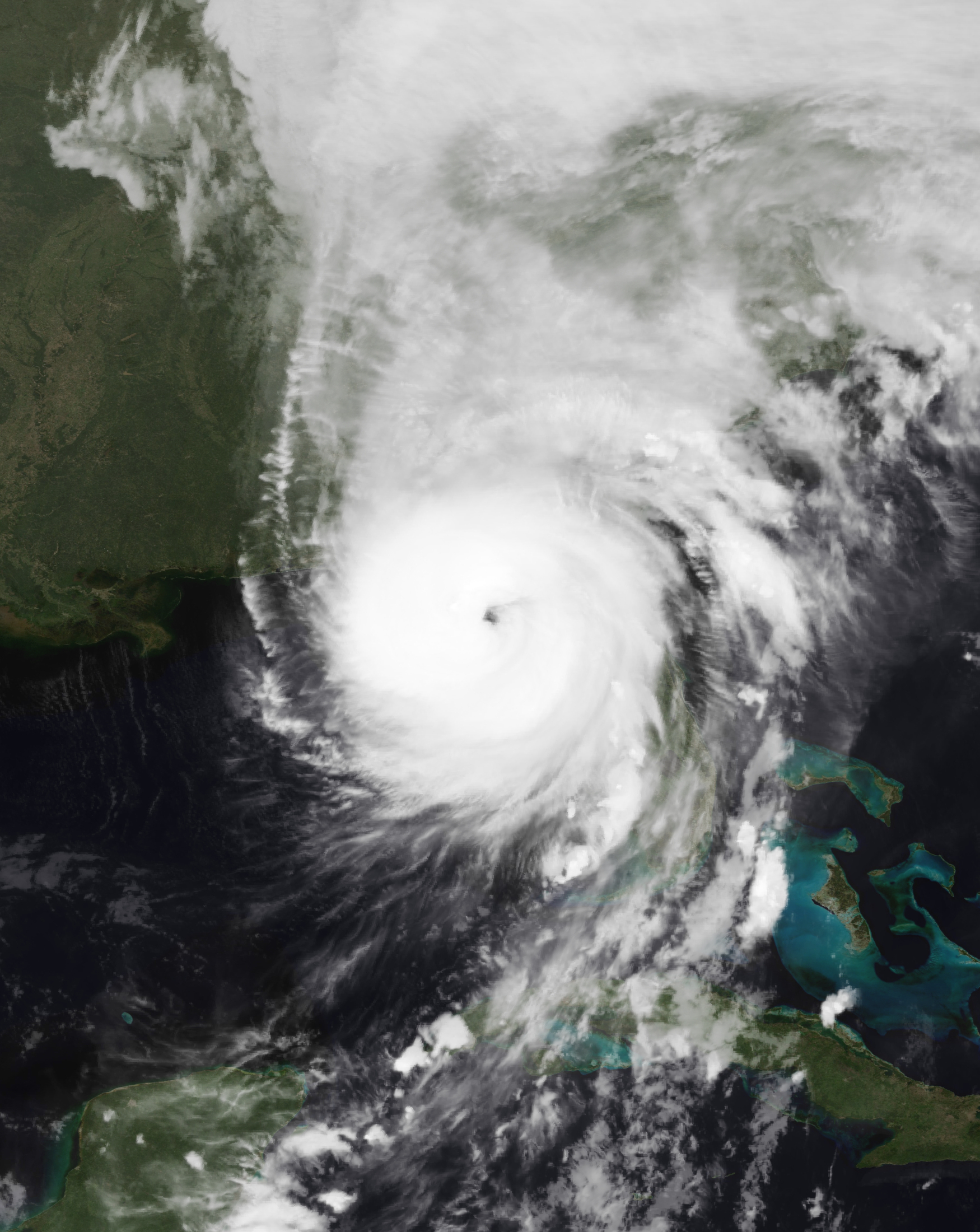
- Hurricane Helene approaching the Big Bend region of Florida on September 26

Meteorological history
- Formed: September 24, 2024
- Extratropical: September 27, 2024
- Dissipated: September 29, 2024

Category 4 major hurricane
- 1-minute sustained (SSHWS/NWS)
- Highest winds: 140 mph (220 km/h)
- Lowest pressure: 939 mbar (hPa); 27.73 inHg

Overall effects
- Fatalities: 253 total
- Injuries: ≥117
- Missing: 3
- Damage: $78.7 billion (2024 USD) (Fifth-costliest tropical cyclone on record; costliest in North Carolina history)
- Areas affected: Yucatán Peninsula; Honduras; Cayman Islands; Cuba; Eastern United States; Midwestern United States
- Part of the 2024 Atlantic hurricane season
- Effects: Florida; Georgia; North Carolina; Related: Misinformation; Other wikis: Commons: Helene images

Hurricane Helene (/hɛˈliːn/ heh-LEEN) was a powerful and devastating tropical cyclone that caused widespread catastrophic damage and numerous fatalities across the Southeastern United States in late September 2024. It was the strongest hurricane on record to strike the Big Bend region of Florida, the deadliest Atlantic hurricane since Hurricane Maria in 2017, and the deadliest to strike the mainland U.S. since Hurricane Katrina in 2005.

The eighth named storm, fifth hurricane, and second major hurricane (Note: A major hurricane is a tropical cyclone that reaches at least Category 3 intensity on the Saffir–Simpson scale.) of the 2024 Atlantic hurricane season, Helene began forming on September 22, 2024 as a broad low-pressure system in the western Caribbean Sea. By September 24, the disturbance had consolidated enough to become a tropical storm as it approached the Yucatán Peninsula, receiving the name Helene from the National Hurricane Center. Weather conditions led to the cyclone's intensification, and it became a hurricane early on September 25. More pronounced and rapid intensification ensued as Helene traversed the Gulf of Mexico the following day, reaching Category 4 intensity on the evening of September 26. Late on September 26, Helene made landfall at peak intensity in the Big Bend region of Florida, near the city of Perry, with maximum sustained winds of 140 mph (220 km/h). Helene weakened as it moved quickly inland before degenerating to a post-tropical cyclone over Tennessee on September 27. The storm then stalled over the state before dissipating on September 29.

Helene's precursor and early stages caused flooding in Nicaragua, Honduras, the Cayman Islands, and the Yucatán Peninsula, where high winds left more than 120,000 customers without electricity in Quintana Roo. Storm surge in Florida caused significant damage from the Tampa Bay area northward. Hillsborough and Pinellas counties combined reported the destruction of at least 419 residences, major damage to at least 18,512 structures, and minor to moderate damage to 13,909 others. Several counties in or near the Big Bend suffered extensive wind impacts. Heavy crop and timber losses occurred over southern Georgia, totaling about $5.5 billion. Tens of thousands of homes and buildings suffered wind damage as far north as the Augusta area, while floodwaters entered at least 200 structures and a number of vehicles in the Atlanta area. Catastrophic flooding and more than 2,000 landslides occurred over the southern Appalachian Mountains, especially North Carolina, due to rainfall totals up to 30.78 in (782 mm) in Busick, North Carolina. In North Carolina, over 125,000 housing units and approximately 822,000 acres (333,000 ha) of timberland suffered some degree of damage. Thousands of miles of bridges and roads were damaged by floodwaters. At least 106 fatalities occurred in North Carolina, far more than any other state. Helene and its remnants also spawned thirty-nine tornadoes across the United States, one of which killed two people in Wheeler County, Georgia. Flooding also impacted Virginia, West Virginia, and Ohio, leaving 12 homes destroyed and 104 others damaged in Pulaski County, Virginia, alone. More than 7.4 million customers lost electricity across the United States. At least 253 deaths and $78.7 billion in damages have been attributed to Helene, making it the second-deadliest hurricane to strike the continental United States in fifty years, after Katrina in 2005, and the deadliest overall since Maria in 2017, as well as being the fifth costliest hurricane in the United States.

== Meteorological history ==
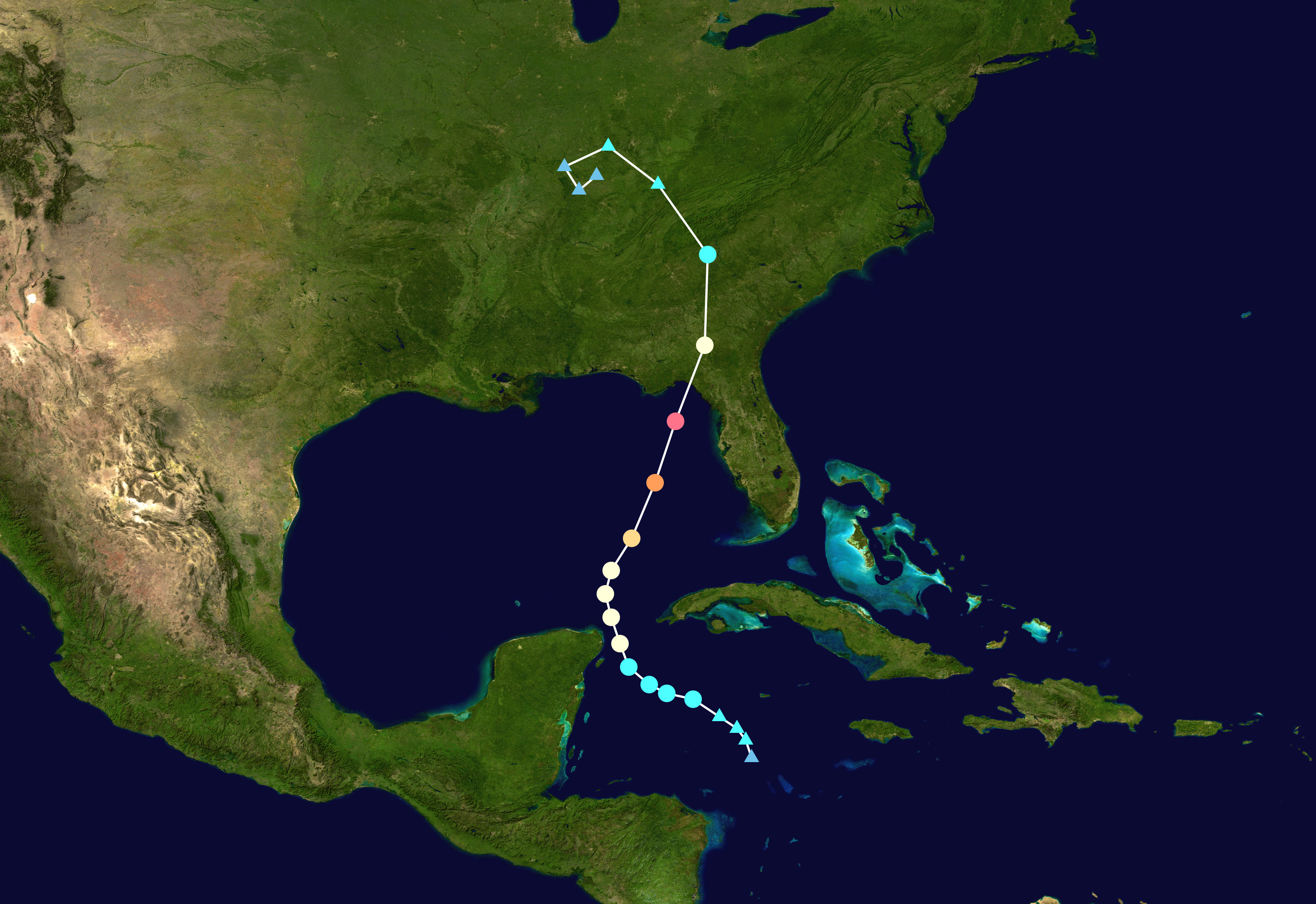
Map plotting the storm's track and intensity, according to the Saffir–Simpson scale Map key Saffir–Simpson scale Tropical depression (≤38 mph, ≤62 km/h) Tropical storm (39–73 mph, 63–118 km/h) Category 1 (74–95 mph, 119–153 km/h) Category 2 (96–110 mph, 154–177 km/h) Category 3 (111–129 mph, 178–208 km/h) Category 4 (130–156 mph, 209–251 km/h) Category 5 (≥157 mph, ≥252 km/h) Unknown Storm type Tropical cyclone Subtropical cyclone Extratropical cyclone, remnant low, tropical disturbance, or monsoon depression

On September 17, 2024, the National Hurricane Center (NHC) highlighted the potential for tropical cyclogenesis in the western Caribbean Sea. Conditions conducive for development of a tropical cyclone resulted from the interaction of the Central American gyre—a broad monsoon low pressure system—and the Madden–Julian oscillation, which reinforced the large-scale cyclonic flow extending from the eastern Pacific Ocean to the western Caribbean Sea. Several days later, on September 22, a broad low-pressure area developed within the western Caribbean. As the system traversed an environment conducive for tropical cyclone development, showers and thunderstorms associated with the disturbance gradually consolidated. Due to the system's imminent threat to land, it was designated Potential Tropical Cyclone Nine on September 23. The next day, Air Force Reserve Hurricane Hunters aircraft and satellite data indicated that a low-level center had formed by 12:00 UTC, leading to the NHC to upgrade the system to Tropical Storm Helene with maximum sustained winds of 45 mph (72 km/h). The system continued strengthening, becoming a hurricane by 12:00 UTC on September 25 as it entered the Gulf of Mexico while turning north. An upper-level trough to its west and a ridge of high pressure located off the Southeastern United States both served to steer the cyclone towards the U.S. Gulf Coast. Helene was an extensive system, with the NHC noting in multiple forecast discussions that the forecast storm radii were "at the 90th percentile of hurricane size at similar latitudes".

Radar loop of Hurricane Helene at landfall in the Big Bend region of Florida early on September 27

After remaining steady in intensity for a while due to its broad size and some entrainment of drier air to its west, Helene rebounded on the morning of September 26. Aided by low mid-level wind shear, high relative humidity, and sea surface temperatures exceeding 86 °F (30 °C) near the Loop Current, the system began to rapidly intensify. An increasingly defined eye developed, and Helene reached Category 2 intensity at 12:00 UTC. By 18:00 UTC, Helene strengthened to a Category 3 major hurricane, with sustained winds up to 120 mph (190 km/h). At 00:00 UTC on September 27, the hurricane attained its peak intensity with maximum sustained winds of 140 mph (220 km/h) and a minimum barometric pressure of 939 millibars (27.73 inHg). Retaining this intensity, it made landfall about 10 miles (16 km) west-southwest of Perry, Florida at 3:10 UTC, becoming the strongest hurricane to strike Florida's Big Bend region since records began in 1900. Rapid weakening occurred as the storm tracked inland, and it weakened to a Category 2 hurricane at 5:00 UTC shortly after crossing into Georgia. Weakening further, it became a tropical storm over east central Georgia at 9:00 UTC. Helene transitioned to a post-tropical cyclone at 18:00 UTC by September 27 in southern Kentucky, with the system losing deep convection and merging with a cut-off low to its west. After executing a slow-cyclonic loop, remnants of Helene dissipated at 18:00 UTC on September 28 over north-central Tennessee.

As Helene moved north into the Southern Appalachian Mountains, the storm would encounter the terrain of the Blue Ridge and Black Mountains. As it passed through, there was a significant and noticeable amplifying of rainfall, as well as a rapid increase in cooling, condensation and precipitation in the region.

=== Influence of climate change ===
On October 9, researchers with World Weather Attribution concluded with "high confidence" that Helene was made worse by climate change. In a scientific assessment, researchers found the 2.3 °F (1.3 °C) increase in temperatures due to climate change increased Helene's rainfall by 10% and maximum wind speeds by 11%, or 13.6 mph (22 km/h), as compared to a similar storm in prior cooler conditions.

== Preparations ==
=== Mexico ===
Tropical storm warnings were issued on September 24, 2024, for the eastern Yucatán Peninsula. Parts of Quintana Roo and Yucatán were placed under a blue alert, indicating indirect impacts. It was later raised to red alert, maximum danger. Cruise ship arrivals in the former state's ports were canceled for September 24 and 25. Tren Maya was also closed. On Isla Mujeres, two shelters were opened. Evacuations were carried out in vulnerable areas. Visitors of Isla Holbox were offered a ferry ride off the island at no cost. Classes were suspended in Quintana Roo.

=== Caribbean ===
==== Cayman Islands ====
The Cayman Islands were under a tropical storm warning on September 24. The Cayman Islands' Red Cross shelter opened in preparation for the storm; nobody used it. Sandbagging sites opened on Grand Cayman and Cayman Brac. Due to the threat of heavy rainfall, schools in the Cayman Islands were closed on September 23. Charles Kirkconnell International Airport and Owen Roberts International Airport were closed ahead of Helene's arrival. The Cayman Islands Regiment was deployed ahead of the system to help with the preparation and distribution of sandbags. Additionally, a small craft warning was issued for the islands on September 23, with a marine advisory issued the next day. The tropical storm warning was canceled the next day.

==== Cuba ====
Tropical storm warnings and hurricane watches were issued for western Cuba. Medical brigades were prepared for flood-prone areas; as heavy rain began to fall, schools and ports were closed, and fishing boats were called in. Due to adverse weather conditions caused by Helene, the Provincial Transport Company of Havana suspended ferry services in Regla. Additionally, the Maritime Administration of Cuba suspended navigation in the Gulf of Batabanó.

=== United States ===
Amtrak modified or canceled several of its southeastern train routes between September 27 and October 1 because of the storm.

==== Florida ====
Hurricane warnings were issued for the Big Bend area of Florida, and the entire state except the westernmost part of the Florida panhandle was put under a tropical storm warning. In addition, on the evening of September 26, an extreme wind warning was issued for the east part of the Florida panhandle, the first since Hurricane Idalia. On September 23, Ron DeSantis, the governor, issued a state of emergency for 41 of Florida's 67 counties. The next day, this was expanded to 61 counties. U.S. President Joe Biden authorized a federal disaster declaration for 61 counties across Florida. Locally, Volusia County issued a state of emergency. Several sandbagging sites opened up across the state. On September 24, several state parks were closed: four of them in Franklin County, two in Gulf County, and one in Gadsden County.

In the Tampa Bay area, officials announced that schools would be closed ahead of the storm. A college football game between Florida A&M University and Alabama A&M University, which was scheduled for the weekend of September 28–29, was postponed until November 29 due to the storm. At Florida State College at Jacksonville, classes and activities at the campus were canceled for two days. The SpaceX Crew-9 mission, which would have launched from the Cape Canaveral Space Force Station on September 26, was delayed to September 28 due to the storm. The Central Florida Zoo and Botanical Gardens planned to close on September 26 and canceled events on that date.

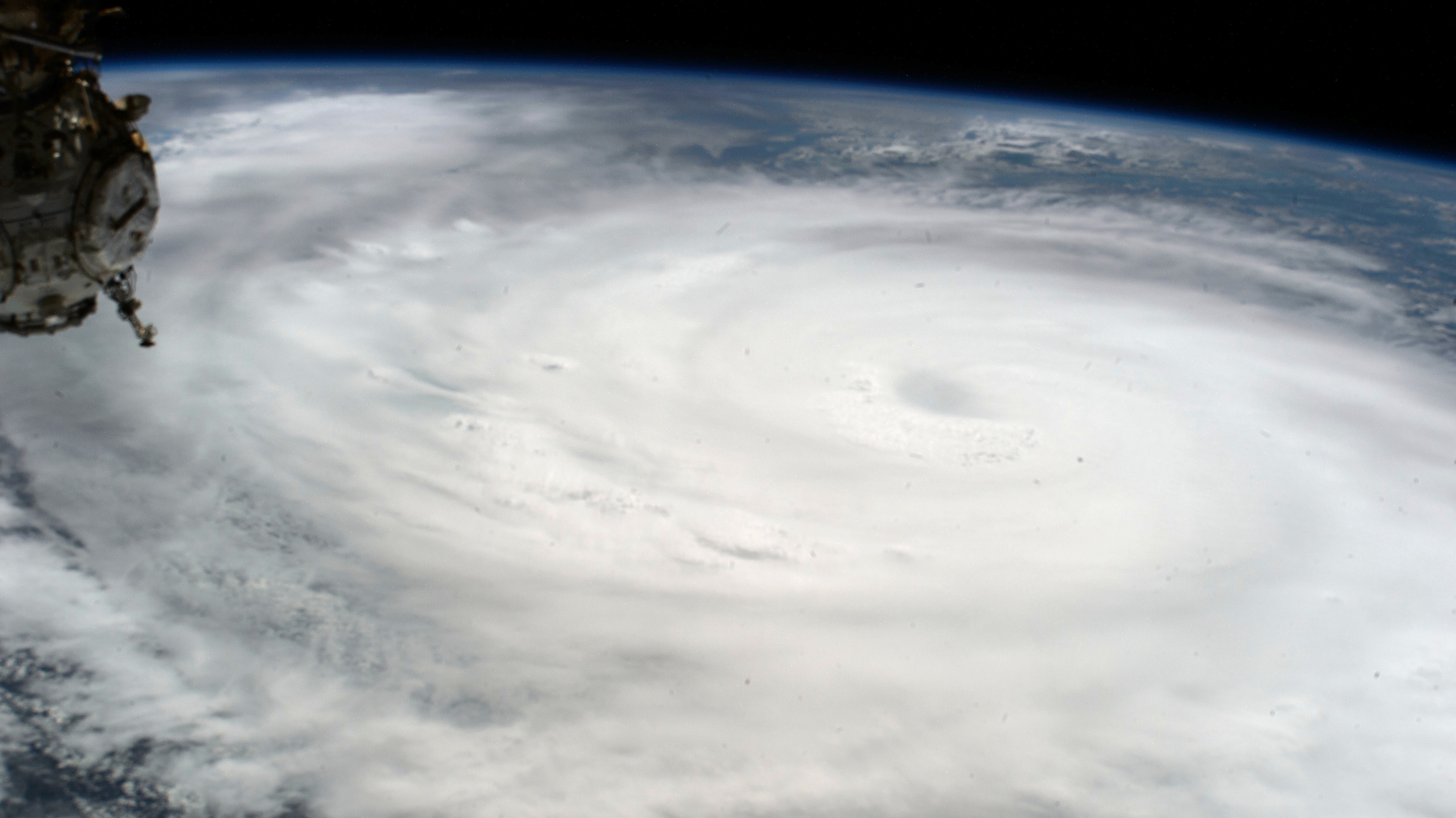
Helene seen from the International Space Station on September 26

Mickey's Not-So-Scary Halloween Party was canceled due to Helene, with SeaWorld Orlando and several other parks in Walt Disney World and Universal Orlando also closing or modifying their hours. Halloween Horror Nights was also canceled. The universities of Central Florida, Embry–Riddle Aeronautical, Florida, Florida A&M, Florida Atlantic, Florida Gulf Coast, Florida State, Keiser, Lynn, North Florida, South Florida, and Stetson announced closures of their campuses and suspended academic operations. Leon County opened up schools to be used as shelters.

On September 24, Citrus County issued mandatory evacuations for zone A, which includes coastal areas in the communities of Crystal River and Homosassa. In Wakulla County, a mandatory evacuation was ordered for all residents and visitors. In contrast, in Hernando County, mandatory evacuations were ordered for anyone west of US 19 and all residents in coastal or low-lying areas and those living in manufactured homes. Two prisons in Wakulla County holding a combined 2,500 inmates were not evacuated despite the evacuation order issued to residents. Gulf County issued mandatory evacuations for all visitors. In Charlotte County and Franklin County, mandatory evacuations were issued for barrier islands, low-lying and flood-prone areas, manufactured homes, and homes that did not meet building codes. In Sarasota County, officials issued an evacuation order for Level A and manufactured home communities on September 25.

Busch Gardens Tampa Bay, St. Pete–Clearwater International Airport, and Tampa International Airport were closed on September 26. Further north, Tallahassee International Airport was closed the same day.

Prior to Helene's landfall, residents in Florida showed the highest level of perception of disaster likeliness at 84% believing that there would likely be a major meteorological event, according to a 2023 FEMA National Household Survey. Despite this, there was also a relatively low preparedness rate within the state, with only about 47% of residents saying that they believed they could stay home in case of a major meteorological event.

==== Georgia ====
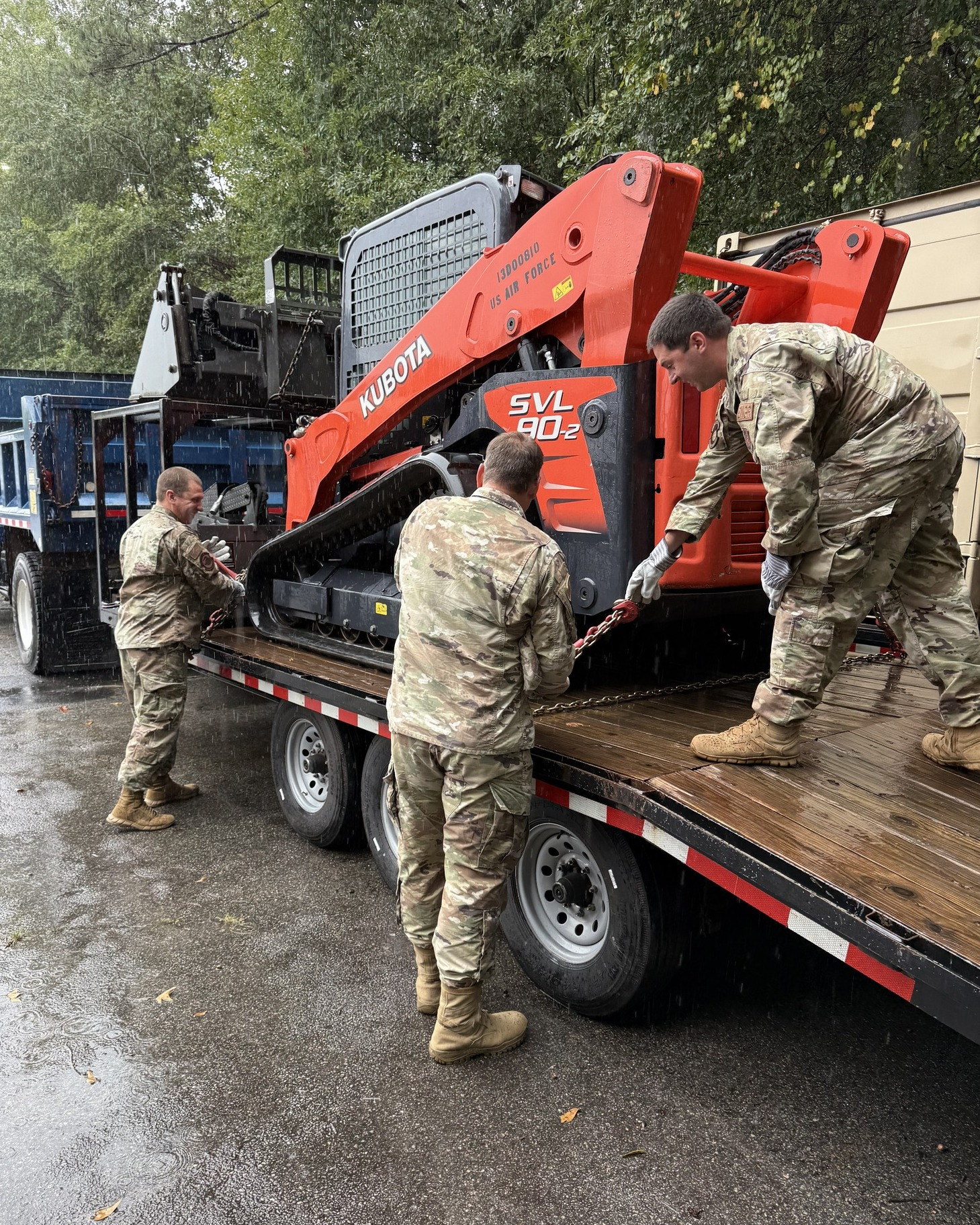
Georgia National Guard preparing for the hurricane

The coast of Georgia was placed under tropical storm warnings. In contrast, southwestern Georgia was placed under a hurricane warning which extended as far north into the state as Spalding County, and all tropical storm watches in Georgia were replaced with tropical storm warnings as far north as the Tennessee and Georgia state border. The National Weather Service in Peachtree City accidentally issued a hurricane warning for Jackson County when it was supposed to be a tropical storm warning.

In addition, on the night of September 26, an extreme wind warning was issued for portions of southern Georgia, including Valdosta. On September 24, in preparation for Helene, officials in the counties of Bryan, Candler, and Chatham began mobilizing emergency response centers. Colquitt, Thomas, and Decatur counties opened shelters. On the same day, Governor Brian Kemp issued a state of emergency for Georgia since Helene was expected to track into the state. In Thomas County, the Public Works Department began providing sandbags due to the storm.

On September 25, schools were closed in the counties of Bibb and Twiggs. Many schools in the Atlanta metropolitan area canceled instruction for September 26 and 27, such as Atlanta Public Schools, with some counties moving students and non-essential workers online. Also, some schools went to a digital learning day, for example, Gwinnett County Public Schools had a digital learning day on the 26th and was canceled altogether on the 27th. Elsewhere, in Clayton County, schools and indoor and outdoor athletic events were canceled. The Cumberland Island National Seashore and Fort Pulaski National Monument closed on September 25 in preparation for the hurricane. The Atlanta Braves postponed the remaining two games in a series against the New York Mets to September 30 in a doubleheader. Curfews were implemented by several localities on September 26. Emory University moved classes online for September 26 and 27, and the University of Georgia cancelled classes entirely. Ahead of the storm, vice-presidential nominee JD Vance canceled two events on September 26 for the 2024 Trump–Vance campaign scheduled in Macon and Flowery Branch.

==== South Carolina ====
The entirety of South Carolina was put under a tropical storm warning on September 25, followed by a statewide state of emergency being issued by Governor Henry McMaster the same day. Congaree National Park closed at 4:00 pm local time on September 26 through September 27 due to the hurricane. On September 27, Fort Sumter and Fort Moultrie National Historical Park and Charles Pinckney National Historic Site temporarily closed due to the hurricane threatening the safety of visitors and staff. Schools in Bamberg, Fairfield, Kershaw, Lee, Saluda, Sumter, Richland One and Two counties, University of South Carolina, Clarendon, Calhoun, Newberry, Orangeburg, Lexington One, Two, and Four, and Lexington-Richland Five counties all closed and switched to e-learning classes on September 27. On September 25, the Weather Prediction Center issued a high risk of excessive rainfall in the Appalachian region of the state.

==== North Carolina ====
Western North Carolina was placed under tropical storm warnings. Governor Roy Cooper declared a state of emergency for North Carolina. Both Gorges State Park and Mount Mitchell State Park were closed due to the storm, with a shutdown also occurring on the Blue Ridge Parkway.

==== Elsewhere ====
Portions of Indiana and Ohio were placed under high wind warning or wind advisory alerts as a result of remnants of the hurricane producing wind speeds of at least 10–35 mph (16–56 km/h) as well as wind gusts up to 50 mph (80 km/h). In Alabama, Henry and Houston Counties were placed under a hurricane warning. Several eastern counties were also placed under tropical storm warning. Several school districts in Alabama either canceled school or released early in preparation for Helene. A state of emergency was approved for the state by President Joe Biden. In Louisville, Kentucky, a music festival, Louder Than Life, canceled their Friday shows due to strong winds. Glenn Youngkin, the Governor of Virginia, issued a state of emergency. Virginia Task Force 1 along with Maryland Task Force 1 were deployed to Hurricane Helene.

== Impact ==
=== Honduras ===
Honduras experienced heavy rains as a result of the Central American gyre which preceded Helene. As a result, the Goascorán River brought flooding to nearby communities located in low-lying areas through Valle and Choluteca departments, reaching a level over 0.48 feet (0.15 m). A state of emergency was issued in San Marcos de Colón, Choluteca, due to overall damage caused by the storm. Nearly 30 homes were estimated to be affected in El Cubulero, Alianza, Valle. Due to high waves onshore, 120 families were affected in the coastal town of Marcovia, Choluteca; at least one home was destroyed. Heavy rainfall left communities isolated, and 50 people were sheltered in El Paraíso due to severe floods.

=== Mexico ===
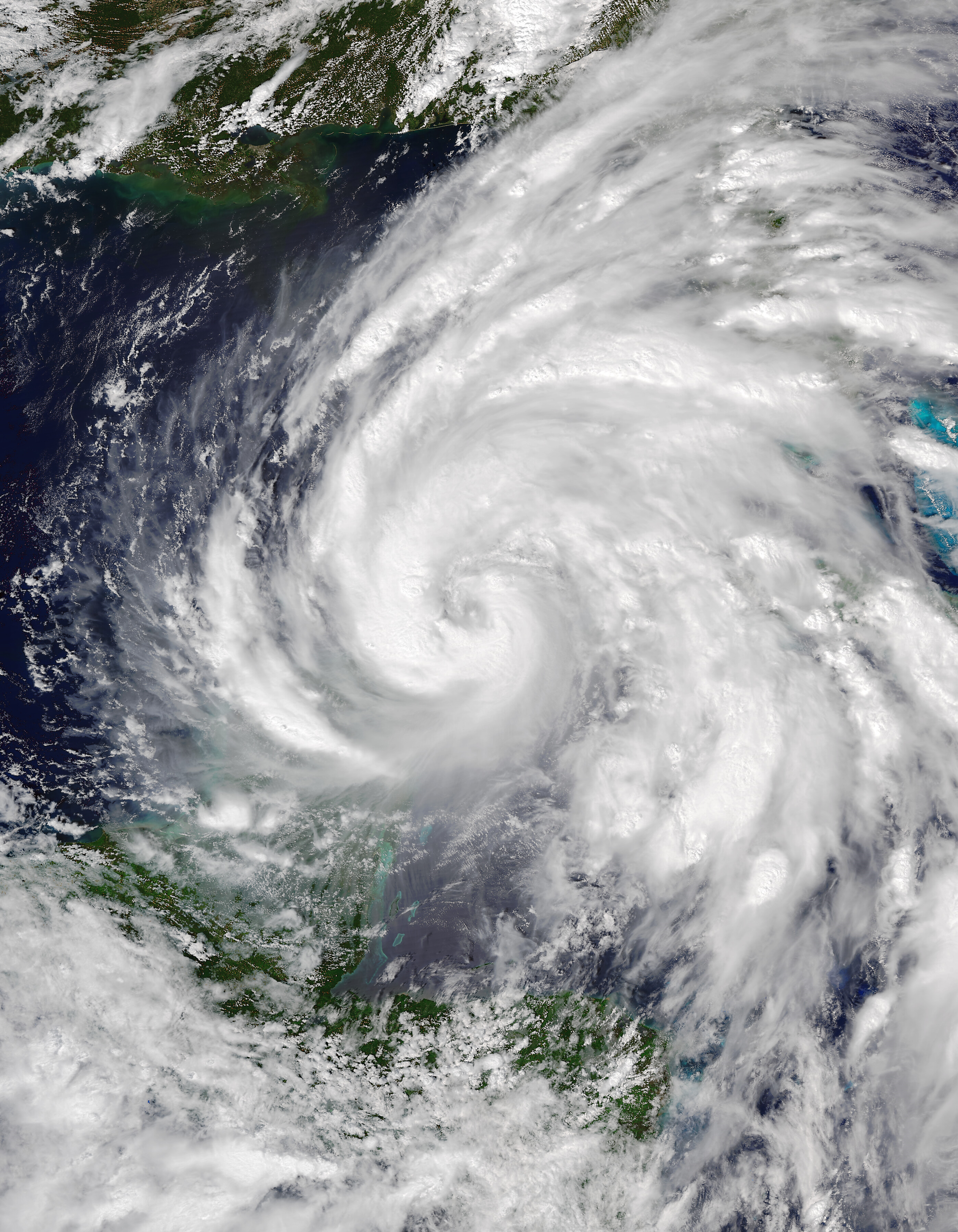
Hurricane Helene over the Gulf of Mexico on September 25

The region around Cancún received 240 mm (9.4 in) of rain. Over 120,000 customers, 14% of all Comisión Federal de Electricidad customers, lost power in Quintana Roo. Extreme flooding covering much of Isla Mujeres occurred. The island also experienced wind gusts up to 69 mph (111 km/h). Cancún and Cozumel saw very rough surf, breaking the seawall in Cozumel and increasing beach erosion in Cancún. Flights at Cozumel International Airport were delayed while Cancún International Airport saw nearly 100 cancellations or delays. Only minor delays occurred at Mérida Airport. The companies most affected by Helene were Viva Aerobus, Volaris, and Aeromexico. Trees fell and roofs were damaged across the Yucatán Peninsula. A gas explosion occurred in Cancún during Helene, but no fatalities were reported. No deaths nor major damage were reported in Mexico during Helene.

=== Caribbean ===
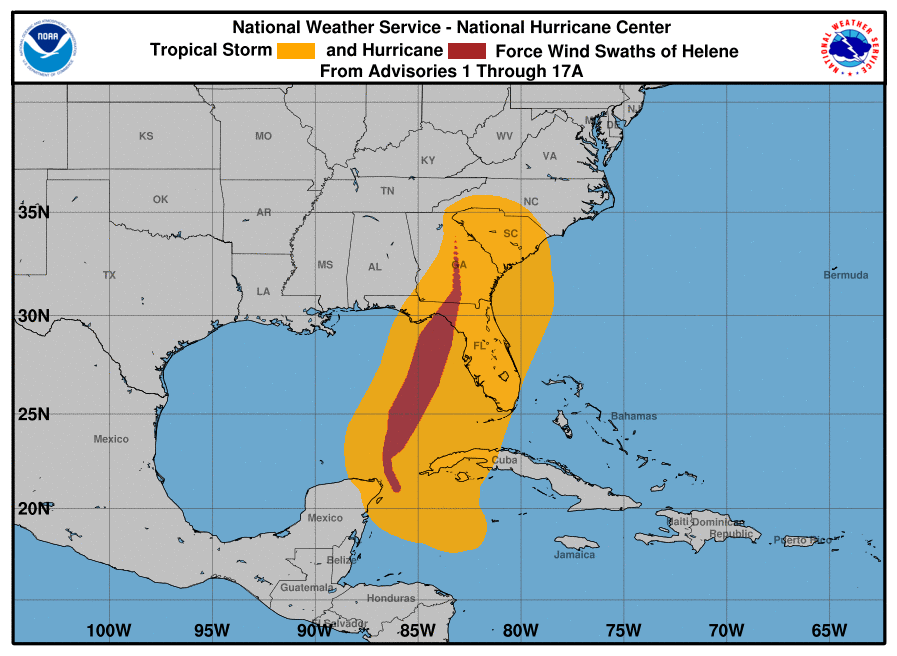
A map highlighting areas affected by Hurricane Helene's tropical storm and hurricane-force wind fields

==== Cayman Islands ====
Over 10 inches (250 mm) of rain fell onto the Cayman Islands. Heavy rainfall and large waves began affecting the Cayman Islands on September 24. Roads in George Town were flooded as rainfall produced by the storm caused 14 power outages, affecting 118 customers across Grand Cayman. The government began planning to buy land to aid in storm water management. After Helene had passed, Grand Cayman was impacted by 5–7 ft (1.5–2.1 m) waves on September 26.

==== Cuba ====
In Cuba, heavy rainfall occurred, with peak accumulations of 218.4 mm (8.60 in) recorded in Presa Herradura and 186.8 mm (7.35 in) in Palacios. Elsewhere, Punta del Este and Isla de la Juventud received 101 mm (4.0 in), Paso Real de San Diego received 78 mm (3.1 in), Pinar del Río received 72 mm (2.8 in), and Isabel Rubio received 70 mm (2.8 in). In Pinar del Río Province, 17 of the province's 24 reservoirs overflowed. Elsewhere, in El Palenque, road access was cut off due to flooding caused by Helene. Helene's winds caused a failure in the power lines that feed the Guanito transmitter, causing most of the territory, especially San Juan and Martínez, Guane, Mantua, and Minas de Matahambre, to suffer blackouts. Gale-force winds were recorded in the provinces of Isla de la Juventud and Pinar del Río. In total, around 70,000 customers experienced power outages in Pinar del Rio, with another 160,000 residents affected in Artemisa.

In Havana, one person was injured after an uninhabited building collapsed due to heavy rains, and two landslides occurred. Intense rainfall caused the Cuyaguateje River to rise rapidly, causing flooding in parts of Pinar del Río on September 26. Flooding also occurred in Mayabeque Province, primarily in the municipalities of Batabanó, Melena del Sur, and San Nicolás de Bari.

=== United States ===
Impact by state
State	Deaths (Missing)	Damage (US$)	Ref
Florida	34	>$13.9 billion	
Georgia	37	>$6.46 billion	
South Carolina	50	>$1.48 billion	
North Carolina	108	$59.6 billion	
Tennessee	20	$1.35 billion	
Virginia	3	$4.1 billion	
Indiana	1	$2.22 million	
Total	252 (4)	$78.7 billion	

Initial estimates suggested that insured losses could reach US$3–6 billion, according to reinsurance broker Gallagher Re; AM Best estimated losses in excess of US$5 billion. Later estimates by Moody's Analytics estimated that the damage could reach US$20–34 billion. AccuWeather estimated that the total damage and economic loss could cost anywhere from US$225–250 billion. At least four million people have lost power, according to the Omaha Public Power District. Agricultural damage is estimated at US$7 billion. Insured losses are expected to be lower than initially estimated due to standard home insurance policies not including flood insurance coverage, increased coverage restrictions by insurers, and hurricane deductibles. Helene caused 65 wind-related fatalities across the Southeastern United States, the most wind-related fatalities caused by a tropical cyclone in the Contiguous United States since at least 1963.

On September 27, Delta Air Lines at Hartsfield–Jackson Atlanta International Airport issued travel waivers to people impacted by flight cancellations or delays. They also anticipated that there would be travel disruptions due to the force of Hurricane Helene, making it dangerous for airplanes to fly. There were 171 flight cancellations to and from Hartsfield–Jackson Atlanta International Airport, most of which were from Charlotte Douglas International Airport and Augusta Regional Airport. There were 489 flight delays, with most of those flight delays from Tampa International Airport, Augusta Regional Airport, and Jacksonville International Airport. These cancellations and delays included Delta Air Lines, Frontier Airlines, Spirit Airlines, WestJet, and many other airlines.

A Baxter International manufacturing site in Marion, North Carolina, which produced 60% of the nation's sterile intravenous and kidney dialysis fluids for health facilities, was temporarily closed due to flood damage. The closure of the manufacturing site led to a shortage and rationing of IV fluids across hospitals across the country. The shutdown resulted in shortages of parenteral IV fluids through the end of 2024.

Across six affected states, a total of 250 fatalities were recorded. North Carolina reported the highest amount, with 107 deaths recorded across the state. Buncombe County alone accounted for 43 of the total deaths in the state. Florida would report 34 fatalities, Georgia would report 37, and South Carolina would report 50.

==== Florida ====
Most intense landfalling tropical cyclones in the U.S. state of Florida by central barometric pressure as of 2024
Rank	System	Season	Barometric pressure
1	"Labor Day"	1935	892 mbar (hPa)
2	Michael	2018	919 mbar (hPa)
3	Andrew	1992	922 mbar (hPa)
4	"Florida Keys"	1919	927 mbar (hPa)
5	"Okeechobee"	1928	929 mbar (hPa)
6	"Great Miami"	1926	930 mbar (hPa)
6	Donna	1960	930 mbar (hPa)
8	Irma	2017	931 mbar (hPa)
9	Helene	2024	939 mbar (hPa)
10	"Florida"	1948	940 mbar (hPa)
Source: HURDAT, Hurricane Research Division

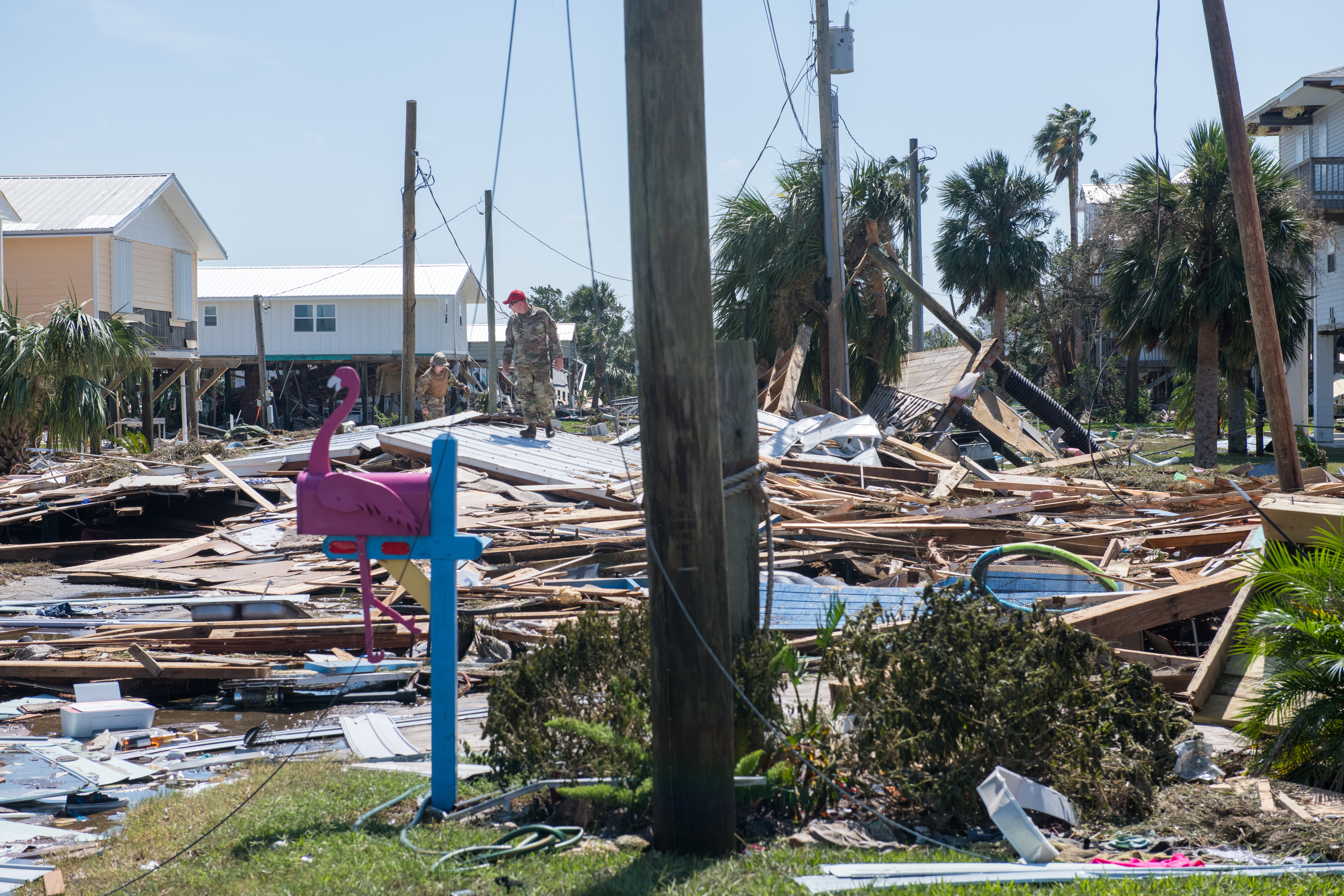
The Florida National Guard cleaning damage in Keaton Beach, Florida, following Helene

By the morning of September 26, 2024, thousands in the Tampa Bay area were experiencing power outages. Wind gusts reached 64 mph (103 km/h) in Fort Lauderdale and 67 mph (108 km/h) in Naples. Key West experienced storm surge of 1 to 3 feet (0.30 to 0.91 m). Storm surge reached 7.18 feet (2.19 m) in Tampa. Areas of the Big Bend experienced inundation of more than 16 feet.

Helene caused 34 deaths in Florida, including at least twelve in Pinellas County; two in Tampa involving a car accident where a sign fell on a car on I-4, along with an elderly woman who drowned inside her house; and one in Dixie County involving a tree falling on a home. Of the deaths in Pinellas, ten have been drownings and one was caused by an electrical fire that started after water rushed into a home. Pasco County Sheriff's Office rescued around 200 people in water emergencies. In Citrus County, over 100 people and 50 pets were rescued after ten feet of storm surge hit the area. In total, over 1,000 people had to be rescued in the Tampa Bay area. As a result of the storm, around 1.69 million customers in Florida lost power. Rainfall in the state peaked at 14.39 in (366 mm) in Liberty county.

Additionally, researchers at Imperial College London, applying extreme event attribution, concluded in October 2024, that 44% of the loss in Florida due to Helene could be attributed to climate change.

==== Georgia ====
Though the storm weakened substantially crossing over Florida, Helene still entered Georgia as a strong category 2 hurricane, with maximum sustained winds estimated at 110 mph (180 km/h). The high winds caused at least $5.5 billion in losses to the timber and agricultural industries.

In Atlanta, the National Weather Service in Peachtree City issued the city's first-ever flash flood emergency due to Atlanta having its heaviest 3-day rainfall totals in 104 years. Rainfall totals over 48 hours in the city reached 11.12 in (282 mm), the most the city has seen in 48 hours since record keeping began in 1878. About 25 people had to be rescued from floods in Atlanta. Localized urban flooding was also reported on multiple interstates like I-285, I-85, I-75 and many other interstate systems encompassing Atlanta. More significant flooding occurred in Buckhead due to overflowing of the Peachtree Creek, which flooded multiple surrounding apartment complexes. Other flooding occurred in areas around Metro Atlanta. The Chattahoochee River overflowed its banks in multiple areas around Fulton County, Georgia and in downstream counties which prompted a water rescue in Coweta County. Three tornadoes were spawned by Helene in the state, including one that killed two people in Wheeler County when it overturned their mobile home. The Wheeler County tornado was rated an EF1, while the other two were rated EF0.

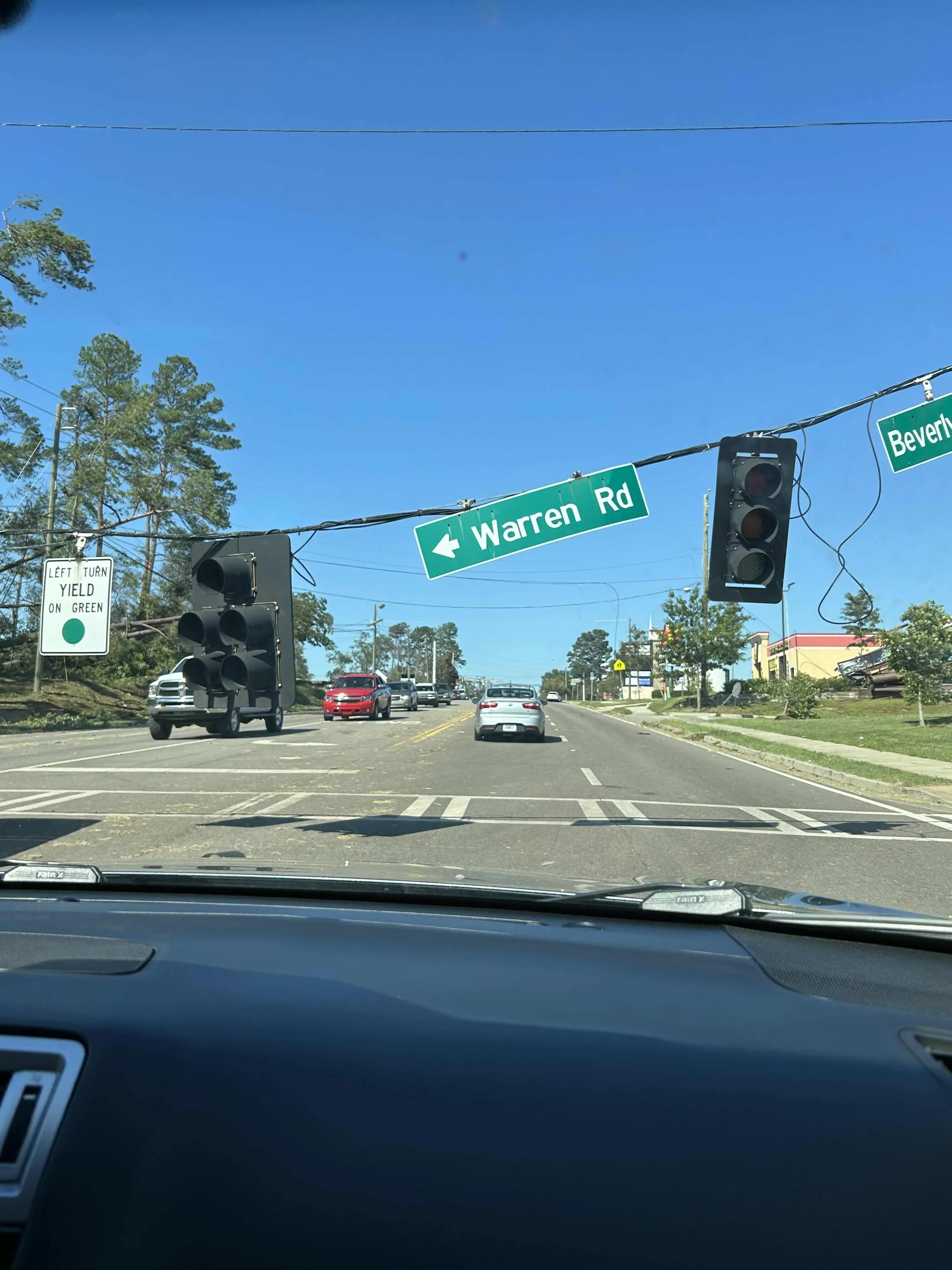
Damaged traffic signal in Augusta on September 30.

Rabun County officials ordered the evacuation of people living below a dam at Lake Rabun after officials were forced to open a third floodgate, inundating several roads and trapping people in their communities in the southern part of the county. Four homes were destroyed by falling trees in White County and Habersham County, but no injuries were reported. Rabun County's emergency management department said many roads were left "impassable" by the storm and that most residents were without power into September 27, urging them to stay home to allow rescue and cleanup personnel to work uninterrupted. The Hiwassee River in Towns County crested at over ten ft (3.0 m), just one ft (0.30 m) below the record, and flooded pastures and parts of a campground, but campers were not reached.

Helene caused significant damage to Georgia's poultry farms, causing damage or total destruction to 107 facilities. Georgia and surrounding regions produce almost half of the 9 billion chickens consumed annually across the United States, and manure runoff from the damaged facilities raised alarms about the quality of streams and groundwater. Power outages in the state totaled an estimated 1.28 million customers. Thirty-seven people died during the storm in the state.

==== South Carolina ====
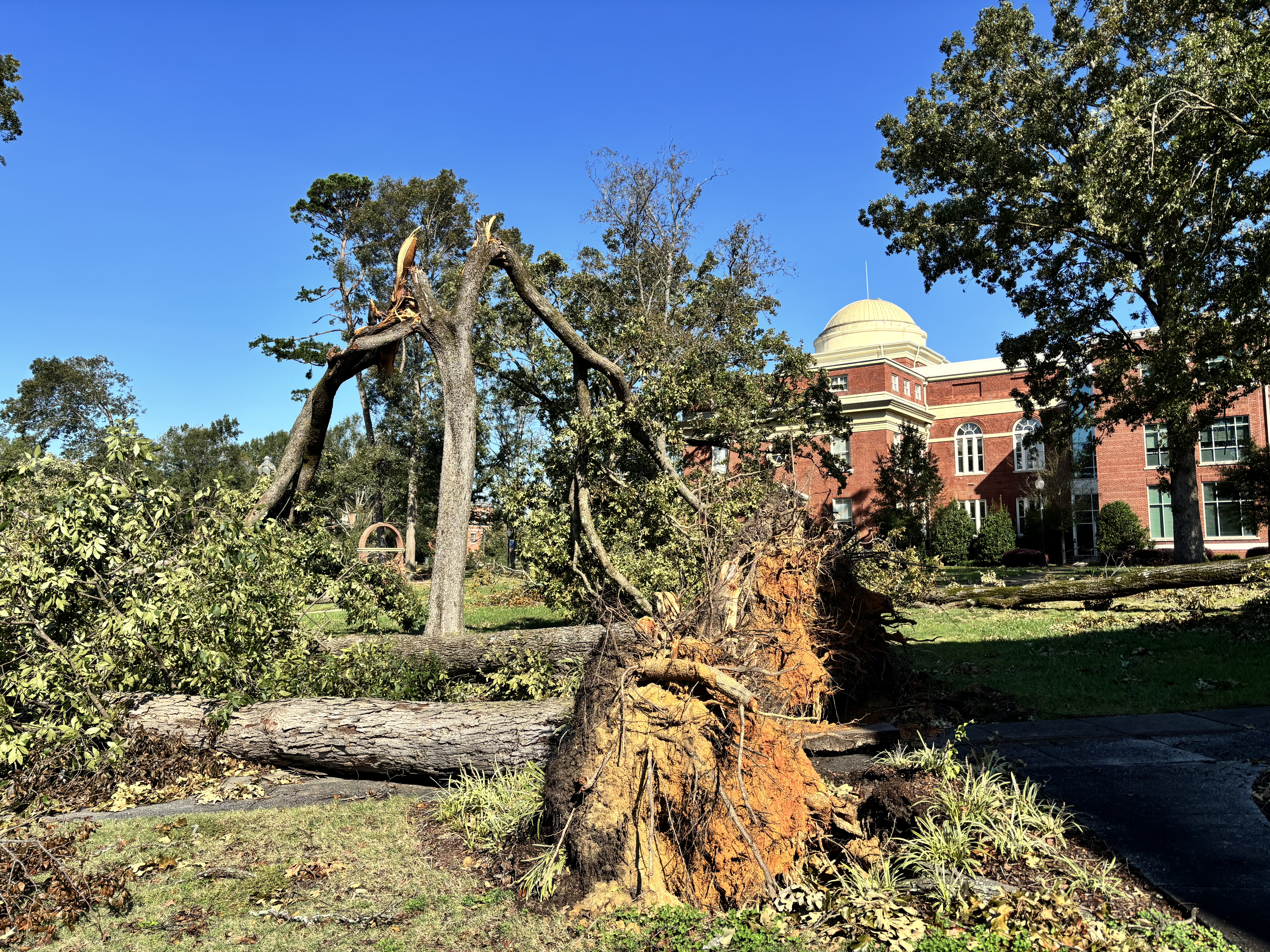
Uprooted and damaged trees on the campus of Presbyterian College in Clinton, South Carolina

Fifty people were killed in South Carolina, 26 directly, 23 indirectly, and 1 unknown, including six each in Spartanburg County and Greenville County, four in Aiken County, and Anderson County, three in Laurens County, two in Newberry County, one in Chesterfield County, three in Saluda County, and one in Greenwood County. Over 1.3 million customers were without power in South Carolina, the most of any state impacted by Helene, with several counties experiencing a near-complete loss of power. Wind gusts reached 72 mph (116 km/h) in Aiken and Anderson, and 75 mph (121 km/h) in Beaufort. Rainfall totals in the state peaked at 21.66 in (550 mm) at Sunfish Mountain. Helene spawned 21 weak tornadoes in the state; five of them were rated EF1, another was rated EFU, and the remaining 15 were rated EF0.

Clemson University faced major online backlash after deciding to host its September 28 homecoming football game against Stanford, bringing 80,295 fans to campus, most of whom were non-locals, at a time when the surrounding upstate, including the nearby city of Clemson and town of Central, were facing widespread power outages and gas shortages. Tailgaters put a heavy strain on already scarce supplies such as gas, hot food from the few local restaurants that remained open, and ice that residents needed to prevent their food from spoiling in the absence of power. Later, on September 28, Clemson University announced that it would be opening some of its powered facilities and offering free food, drinks, ice, charging stations, and showers to the community for members in need of respite following the storm. However, many criticized the university for not doing so sooner. Criticism continued when Clemson University announced that classes would be canceled on Monday, September 30, seemingly contradicting the earlier assertion that the area was recovered well enough to host a game.

An electrical power outage led to one South Carolina factory farm losing 45,000 chickens. Millions more likely died due to Helene's effects across the Southeast, where almost half of the chicken farmed for meat in the United States is produced.

==== North Carolina ====
Flooding from Helene rivaled some of the most destructive inland floods in the state's history, and, in some locations, exceeded them. Prior to Helene, the state had experienced major flooding from hurricanes such as Frances, Ivan, and Jeanne, which produced a combined total of 20 inches of rain. However, the flooding by Helene rivaled these storms and then some. Provisional data shows that the French Broad River reached a high crest point of 24.8 feet (7.6 m), compared to the previous record of 23.1 feet (7.0 m) set in 1916.

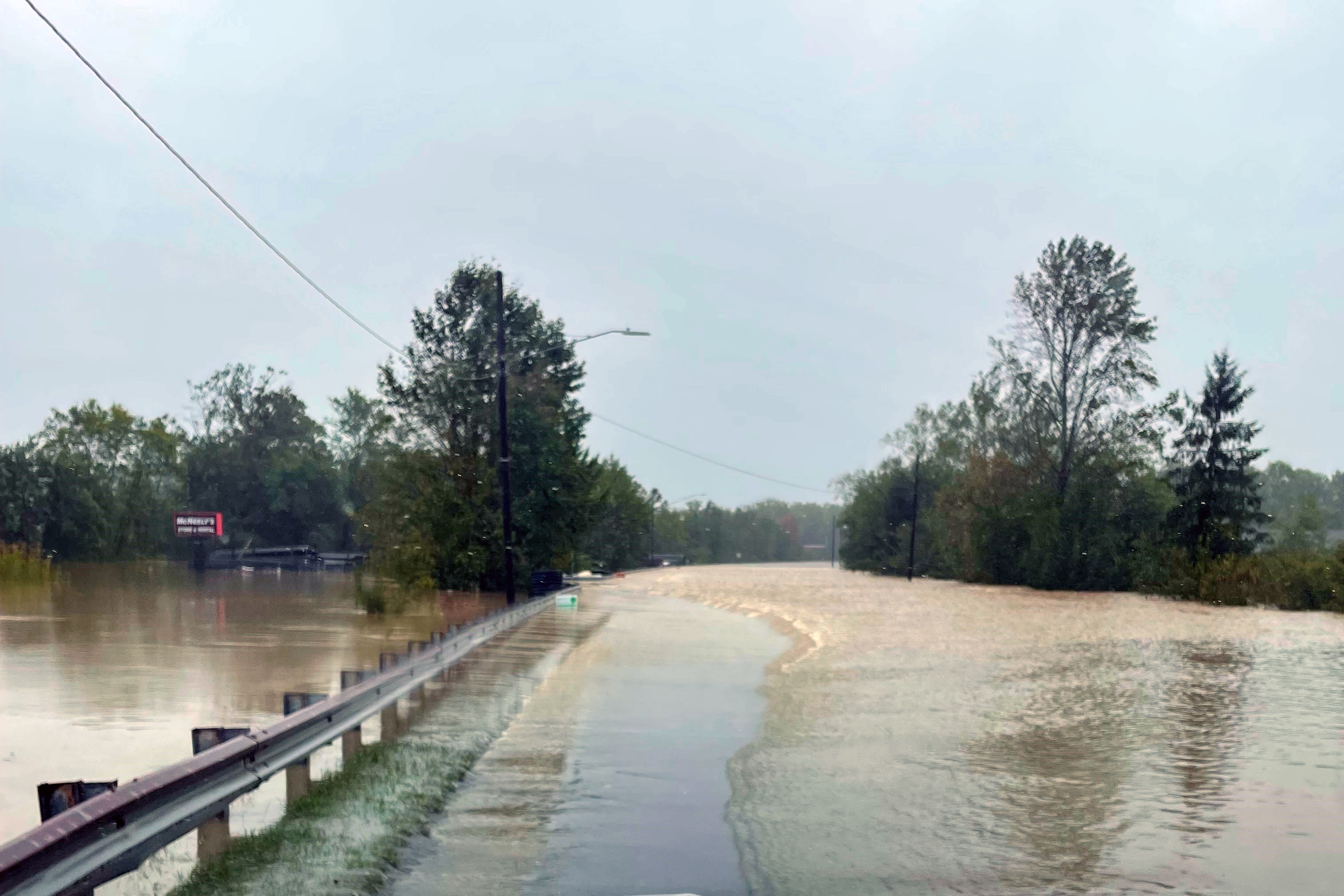
Martin Luther King Jr. Boulevard (US 64) West in Henderson County, North Carolina, on September 27

Although initially up to 115 deaths and more than 200 missing were attributed to Helene in North Carolina, including at least 40 in Buncombe County alone, that number was later revised down to 103 as it emerged that significant double-counting and mis-allocation had occurred in Buncombe County. Two people, a four-year-old girl in Claremont and a 58-year-old man in Gastonia, were killed in traffic collisions during rains caused by Helene. At least 879,000 customers in the state lost power. In Charlotte, high winds from Helene caused a tree to fall onto a residence, killing one person and seriously injuring another. In Winston-Salem, heavy rains and high winds caused a large tree to fall on a gas station, damaging two vehicles. Residents living downstream of Lake Lure were ordered to evacuate as its dam was overtopped by water and imminent failure was expected. Lake Lure Dam was later evaluated, and no imminent failure was expected, although erosion on both sides of the dam and compromise of the structural supports were reported. One woman in the town of Lake Lure was rescued with her dog after being stranded inside a collapsed house along a riverbank. Eight tornadoes were spawned by Helene in the state. This included a brief but intense low-end EF3 tornado that impacted the north side of Rocky Mount, damaging 14 buildings and injuring 15 people, including four critically. Five of the other tornadoes were rated EF1, while the remaining two were rated EF0.

Areas in the Black Mountains region in the western part of the state were particularly devastated. Residents of Swannanoa also reported that no search and rescue operations had reached their location as of September 29, leaving several residents who had not prepared for the degree of flooding without food or drinkable water. Data from the National Weather Service indicated that over 19 in (480 mm) of rain fell in areas upstream of Chimney Rock, leading to devastating floodwaters that destroyed half of the village, including half of the businesses on the southern side of the village near the Broad River. The downtown of Elkin was heavily damaged by floodwaters from the Yadkin River. The Catawba River flooded Morganton and left thousands of residents without power. The Oxford Dam, at Lake Hickory on the Catawba River, spilled over. More than 400 roads were closed in the western part of the state, and over 200 people had to be rescued from floods.

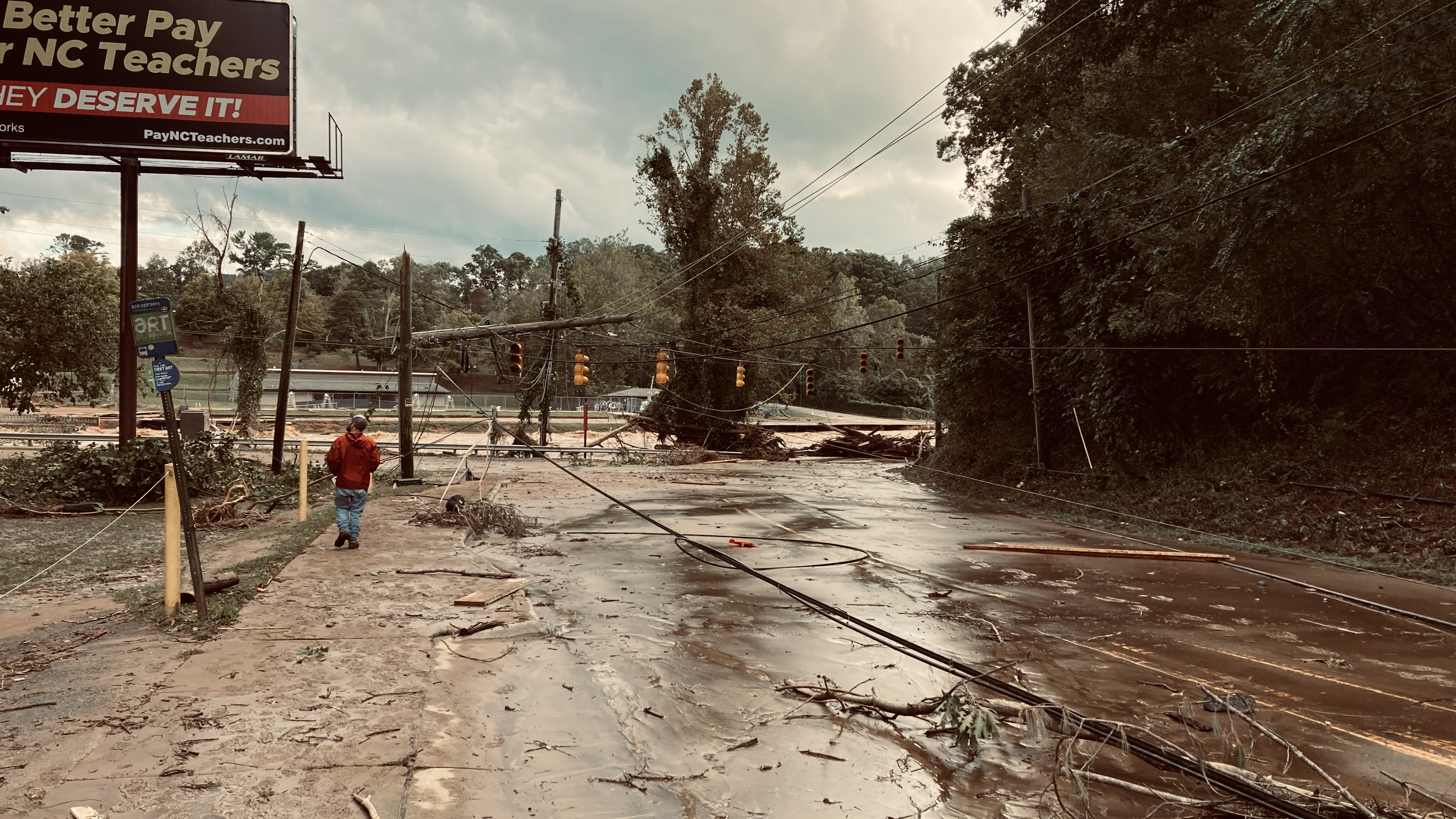
Devastation in Asheville, North Carolina – at the intersection of Swannanoa River Road (NC-81) and Azalea Road – caused by Hurricane Helene

A curfew was issued for Asheville due to damage which occurred inside the city. The city broke their record for two-day rainfall, recording 9.87 in (251 mm) of rain. The Asheville Police Department reported that they had made arrests due to looting. The French Broad River crested at 24.67 ft (7.52 m), and the Swannanoa River reached 26.1 ft (8.0 m), both higher than the all-time records set by the Flood of 1916. Almost the entirety of Biltmore Village and the River Arts District were flooded, and the city was largely isolated due to loss of power and cell service. Landslides around Asheville caused sections of I-26 and I-40 to collapse or wash away, forcing closures of affected routes. Access to Asheville was cut off from September 27–28 via I-26 to South Carolina. A curfew was also issued for Boone after high winds and torrential rain caused flooding, sink holes, and power outages throughout Watauga County.

Appalachian State's football game against Liberty was canceled due to flooding and was not rescheduled. A mudslide and floodwaters from the Pigeon River washed out a section of I-40 at the North Carolina–Tennessee border, forcing another closure. The Pigeon River rose to more than 25 feet (7.6 metres) in Canton, higher than during Hurricane Frances in 2004 and Tropical Storm Fred in 2021. In Busick, rainfall totals reached 30.78 in (782 mm). The University of North Carolina at Asheville canceled all classes through October 9 (later extended through October 28), along with Appalachian State campuses of Boone and Hickory through October 15, and Western Carolina University through October 4. Warren Wilson College and Blue Ridge Community College announced they would remain closed for at least a week. The Asheville School, a boarding school in Asheville, evacuated its students and announced the campus would remain closed until October 14. Christ School, an all-boys Episcopal boarding school in Arden, was not evacuated and the campus was left without power until October 9. Classes would resume six days later.

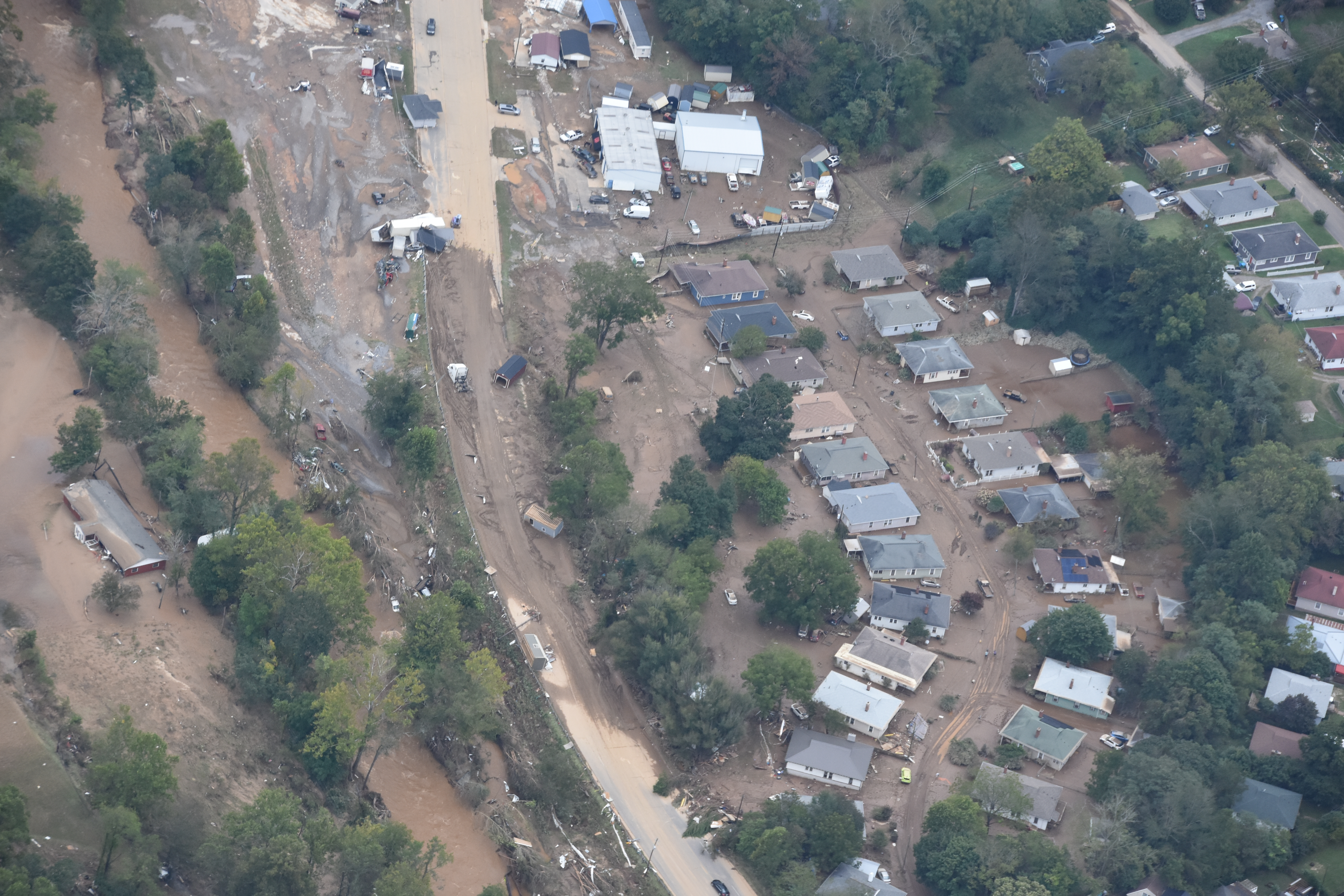
Devastating damage in Buncombe County after the Hurricane Helene floods

The North Carolina Department of Transportation (NCDOT) issued a statement on their website that all roads in western North Carolina should be considered closed. Lees–McRae College in Banner Elk evacuated their campus and by September 29, all students were successfully evacuated with the assistance of the North Carolina National Guard.

Various non-specific online posts were using antisemitic rhetoric and threatening violence against FEMA officials in the aftermath of the storm. In one instance, federal aid workers briefly paused or relocated their work in Rutherford County, North Carolina, as a result. A 44-year-old North Carolina man was later arrested and charged in the Rutherford County incident after he was found with a handgun and a rifle at a supermarket serving as a storm relief site.

Researchers from Lawrence Berkeley National Laboratory found that climate change increased rainfall from the storm by more than 50% in some parts of Georgia and North Carolina. The catastrophic flooding and destruction caused by Hurricane Helene in western North Carolina likely caused at least a record US$59.6 billion in damages and recovery needs. The storm and its aftermath caused 1,400 landslides and damaged over 160 water and sewer systems, at least 6,000 miles (9,700 km) of roads, more than 1,000 bridges and culverts and an estimated 126,000 homes, the budget office said. Some 220,000 households are expected to apply for federal assistance.

==== Tennessee ====
Helicopter crews rescued 58 people, with units from the Virginia State Police assisting, from Unicoi County Hospital in Erwin after the hospital was almost entirely submerged. Part of a set of bridges on I-26/US 23/US 19W spanning the Nolichucky River in Erwin were completely washed away. The Nashville Predators postponed a preseason game against the Tampa Bay Lightning to October 7 due to severe weather in the area. Nashville broke a daily rainfall record on September 27. In Morristown, several trees fell, causing power lines to be snapped throughout the city. Wind gusts in Sparta reached 44 mph (71 km/h). In Newport, the Pigeon River rose to over three times the flood stage and set a new record at 26 feet (7.9 m), flooding portions of the town and nearby I-40. In Johnson County, numerous residents were without power, telephone, and could not leave their residences for several days. Many homes and buildings were washed away during the flooding, notably, Antioch Baptist Church in the Trade community. As of October 1, 2024, across northeastern Tennessee, 85 people were still missing.

Early on September 28, the Tennessee Valley Authority (TVA) utility company issued a Condition Red alert for the Nolichucky Dam, saying that a failure of the dam was imminent, and local authorities issued an evacuation order. However, it was reported by late morning the same day that water levels along the Nolichucky River were lowering. The TVA was investigating the dam to figure out the next steps. 12 mi (19 km) northeast of the Nolichucky Dam, the Kinser Bridge, which is a part of SR 107, usually 60 ft (18 m) above the Nolichucky River, collapsed after floodwaters overran the bridge. A total of five state-maintained bridges were destroyed. A K-9 for the Erwin Police Department named Scotty was found dead on September 28 after going missing during flooding in the Bumpus Cove community. Six employees who were trapped by flood waters at the Impact Plastics plant in Erwin were among the missing and dead, with one worker who survived and family members of the deceased saying workers were not told that they could leave until after flood waters had covered the road to the plant and it lost power. Impact Plastics released a statement expressing sympathy for the workers' deaths and said that employees had not been threatened with termination for leaving the plant. The incident was investigated by the Tennessee Bureau of Investigation, which cleared the company of any criminal wrongdoing.

After the storm, four state parks fully closed, with Panther Creek State Park experiencing trail closures and Seven Islands State Birding Park having both trail and boat ramp closures. Hurricane Helene caused a total agricultural and forestry loss of $1.351 billion.

==== Virginia ====
One person was killed in Craig County after a tree fell onto a building. Another person was killed in Tazewell County when a falling tree struck them as they were cleaning debris. Rainfall reached 12.2 in (310 mm) in the Grayson Highlands, while Galax saw around 8.6 in (220 mm) of rain over a 72-hour period. In the New River Valley, high waters from Helene were seen as far north as Radford University. Damascus saw flooding of 19.5 ft (5.9 m).

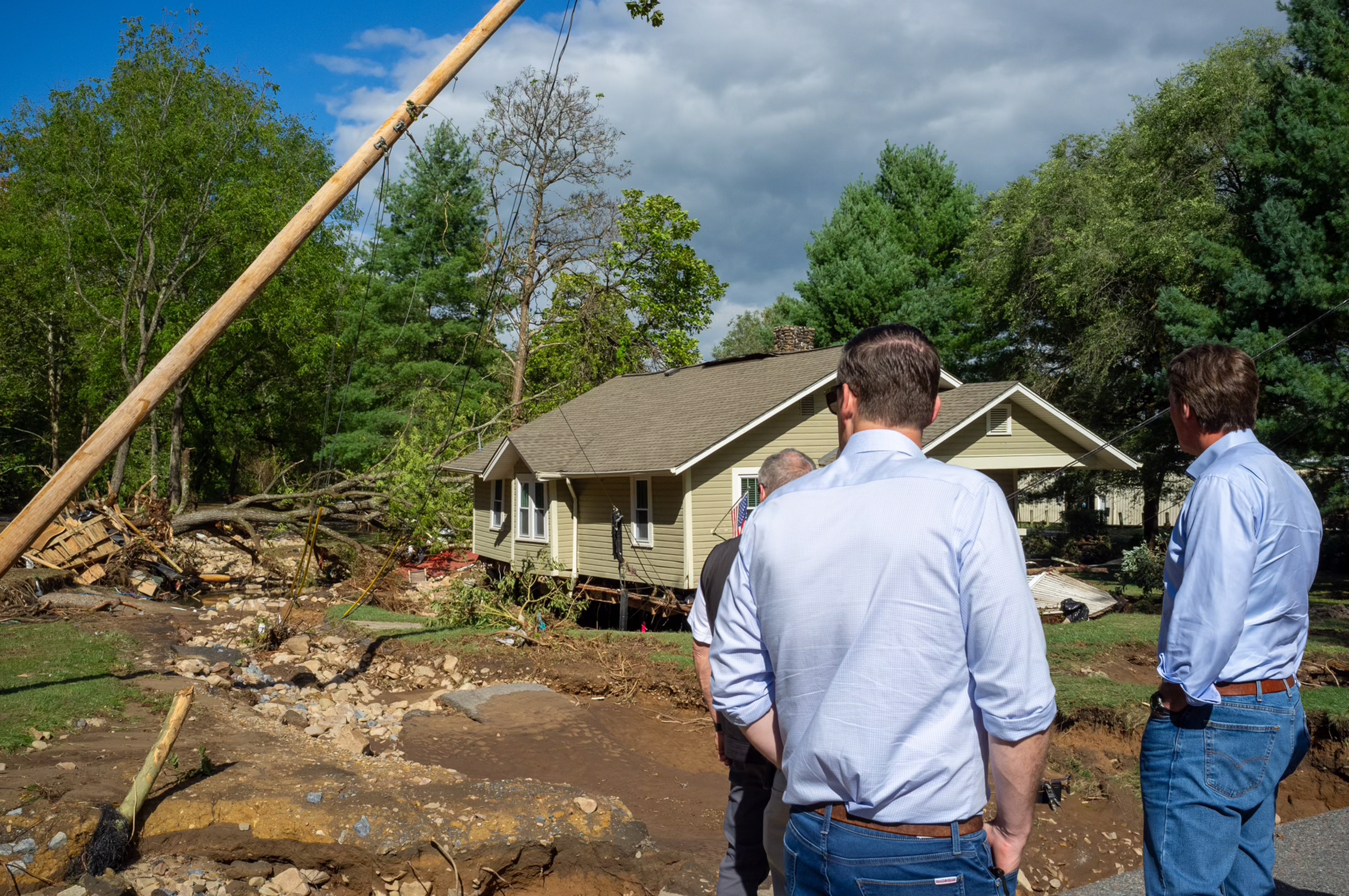
Governor Glenn Youngkin surveying damage in Damascus after the storm

Over 70 water rescue operations occurred in the state, with the Virginia National Guard rappelling from helicopters and pulling people from cars. In Albemarle County, one road was washed out. Elsewhere, SR 670 in Madison County and SR 637 in Greene County suffered heavy damage. Claytor Lake would suffer heavy pollution, with officials noting that their teams had found propane tanks and floating cars behind the dam. In Pulaski County, initial estimates revealed that 45 homes were significantly impacted. At the same time, in Giles County, more than 35 buildings were destroyed. Most of US 21 along the mountainside outside of Independence in Grayson County was destroyed. At the same time, US 58 and Virginia Creeper Trail were wiped out and will need to be rebuilt heading into Damascus. Access to Taylors Valley in Washington County was cut off after the two bridges into the community were destroyed. In the city of Radford, the New River crested at 31.03 ft (9.46 m), only being surpassed by a 35.96 ft (10.96 m) crest on August 14, 1940, due to the remnants of the 1940 South Carolina hurricane. An EF1 tornado caused minor damage in Bedford County, while an EF2 tornado in Pittsylvania County injured one person, damaged 30 structures, and destroyed a mobile home. Another EF1 tornado blew down trees near Keeling as well. Power outages in the state affected 190,000 people.

After the storm, nine state parks and four preserves closed due to damage from Helene. In addition, numerous trails were closed in Shenandoah National Park. The entire Blue Ridge Parkway was closed as well. However, much of the Virginia segment of the highway reopened on October 11.

==== Elsewhere ====
LaRue County, Kentucky, experienced up to 3.61 in (92 mm) of rain. A daily rainfall record was broken in Lexington. Wind gusts in Morgan County exceeded 60 mph (97 km/h). Across Kentucky, nearly 220,000 customers lost power. In Jessamine County, the steeple of Edgewood Baptist Church in Nicholasville, Kentucky was blown off. In Lexington alone, over 110,000 customers had power outages. In West Virginia, there was heavy rainfall. High water ran in Bluefield, and trees blocked multiple roadways. Elsewhere in the state, fallen trees were across parts of Fayette County. In Mercer County, more than 20,000 customers lost power due to Helene. The Denver Broncos, who were practicing at the Greenbrier Resort due to having two consecutive east coast road games, were forced to hold one of their practices in the indoor tennis courts due to the heavy rainfall. Helene's rains have been primarily beneficial, alleviating drought conditions which were in the state since August 2024. In Huntington, a wind gust of 70 mph (110 km/h) was recorded; which was the second highest wind gust ever recorded at that station.

In Illinois, Helene's remnants produced heavy rains and high winds, causing several thousand outages. The waves on Lake Michigan were as high as 10 ft (3.0 m). Portions of Southern Illinois exceeded 6 in (150 mm) of rain from the storm, which caused water levels on the Ohio River to jump by 15 ft (4.6 m) following the storm. However, the rainfall in this region was largely beneficial due to drought conditions from a lack of rain earlier in the month. About 100,000 power outages occurred in Indiana, and winds gusted up to 68 mph (109 km/h). Rainfall in the state peaked at 4.89 in (124 mm) in Mt. Vernon, with 2.02 in (51 mm) of rain in Downtown Indianapolis; heavier rainfall totals occurred in the southern parts of the state. One person was killed due to a fallen tree near Griffin.

Over 120,000 customers lost power in Ohio. An estimated 1,000 households sustained damage in Scioto County due to unexpected heavy rainfall, with 7 in (180 mm) of rain falling within the span of a few hours. Four hundred damage reports have been filed as of September 30, 2024. In the city of Cincinnati, rainfall totals reached 2.05 in (52 mm). Wind gusts in the state reached 67 mph (108 km/h). In the state of Alabama, over 3,000 customers lost power. Isolated regions in Geneva County and Houston County experienced 6–8 in (150–200 mm) of rain. However, a last-second shift to the east lessened impacts throughout the state.

In the Northeast, particularly in New York and New Jersey, light moisture from the northeastern quadrants of Helene's remnants associated with a cold front would precipitate over the tri-state area. Rainfall was overall light with breezy conditions across the region. The peak amount of precipitation was 2.68 in (68 mm) at Wall Township, New Jersey; over 200 locations statewide recorded at least 1 in (25 mm) of rain. Helene's impacts across the region would be the last measured precipitation in that region until November in a historic dry-spell, that would eventually lead to extreme drought conditions in portions of New Jersey. Following the storm, a record long rainless streak was established in Philadelphia.

== Aftermath ==
=== Relief efforts ===
Costliest U.S. Atlantic hurricanes (Note: The storm category color indicates the intensity of the hurricane when landfalling in the U.S.)
Rank	Hurricane	Season	Damage
1	3 Katrina	2005	$125 billion
1	4 Harvey	2017	$125 billion
3	4 Ian	2022	$112 billion
4	4 Maria	2017	$90 billion
5	4 Helene	2024	$78.7 billion
6	4 Ida	2021	$75 billion
7	ET Sandy	2012	$65 billion
8	4 Irma	2017	$52.1 billion
9	3 Milton	2024	$34.3 billion
10	2 Ike	2008	$30 billion

Rapid assessment models played an important role in the early stages of relief from Helene. Developed by researchers in North Carolina, a decision support system was developed wherein health officials integrated 24 datasets to map flooded areas that had a great amount of infrastructure damage. This had led to the discovery of 19,600 wells, 34,300 businesses, and 150 community facilities being affected by flooding across the state.

Hurricane Helene was one of the largest-diameter US Gulf Coast hurricanes. Although large size does not mean strength—which is based on sustained wind measurements—it may mean that more people are exposed to a storm's hazards.

On September 28, 2024, the Omaha Public Power District sent Mutual Aid crews to West Virginia to help with power restoration after Helene, their third in a disaster in 2024. California sent 151 search and rescue members to affected areas. The Federal Emergency Management Agency (FEMA) sent in search-and-rescue teams, bottled water, and Starlink terminals. Additionally, an eastern Kentucky storm chaser contributed 30 Starlink terminals to storm victims in western North Carolina. SpaceX said that they donated approximately 500 terminals through various channels. The American Red Cross and The Salvation Army, among other nonprofit organizations, began deploying emergency disaster services teams in many affected areas. A unit from the 1st Battalion of the 169th Aviation Regiment, part of the Connecticut Army National Guard, was deployed to North Carolina to assist disaster relief efforts. T&T Line Construction of Hornwell, New Brunswick in Canada sent 11 line crews to western North Carolina through its mutual assistance agreement with Duke Energy. "Companies from the US aid us in storms; it's a mutual thing," said a T&T crew leader. Several crews from Quebec, Canada were also seen working around Woodfin, North Carolina. Duke Energy also used helicopters to transport power poles to Henderson County, North Carolina and set the poles into the ground. Two other line workers hiked 1.5 miles over very rough ground to bring a power line into the Asheville NC Veterans' Administration Medical Center that had gone dark due to the storm.

Pack mules were utilized to access areas inaccessible by other means in North Carolina. Operation AirDrop and the Carolina Emergency Response Team helped deploy volunteer private helicopter pilots to assist in rescue efforts.

As of October 1, the White House reported via press release that FEMA had given out 6.5 million liters of water and 7.1 million meals. World Central Kitchen would deploy food trucks to hurricane struck areas, providing more than 64,000 meals in multiple states affected. The owner of a local Mellow Mushroom would give away $5000 of free pizza to Asheville residents. On October 9, Anat Sultan-Dadon brought emergency supplies to the community of North Augusta, South Carolina. The international non-profit agency SmartAID also coordinated with communities in North Carolina and Florida to provide limited electricity and communications systems in areas impacted by Helene.

On October 1, West Virginia Governor Jim Justice declared a state of emergency in Mercer County, enabling the West Virginia Emergency Management Division to implement the Emergency Operations Plan, which allowed swift mobilization of personnel, resources, and essential emergency services. Justice said the emergency declaration "will allow us to speed up the response on the ground and potentially receive federal assistance as we push forward with recovery efforts".

The National Football League (NFL), in collaboration with the Atlanta Falcons, Carolina Panthers, Houston Texans, and Tampa Bay Buccaneers via the NFL Foundation, donated $8 million to the relief effort. The quarterbacks of the Tampa Bay Buccaneers, Baker Mayfield, and the Atlanta Falcons, Kirk Cousins, both donated $50,000 as well. The Major League Baseball (MLB) team, the New York Yankees, donated $1.25 million to American Red Cross relief efforts via the New York Yankees Foundation. The Tampa Bay Rays and their USL Championship team, the Tampa Bay Rowdies, pledged $1 million towards local relief efforts. The National Hockey League (NHL) team, the Carolina Hurricanes, donated their ticket revenue from their game against the Nashville Predators on October 2, totaling $235,000. In addition to the donated ticket revenue, the team held an auction for merchandise and a meet-and-greet with players to raise over $300,000 in total towards relief efforts. In comparison, the Tampa Bay Lightning donated $3 million in collaboration with Ferman Motor Car Company Inc. towards relief efforts. The National Basketball Association (NBA) team, the Charlotte Hornets, committed $1 million towards the American Red Cross and the Second Harvest Food Bank of Metrolina. Dolly Parton announced that she will donate $2 million to relief efforts, $1 million personally and another $1 million through her various businesses and the Dollywood Foundation. Taylor Swift donated $5 million to Feeding America's relief efforts for Helene and Hurricane Milton, which impacted Florida less than two weeks after Helene.

A surge in air traffic over the disaster area occurred due to relief efforts, with an estimated 300% increase in air traffic over western North Carolina alone. The Federal Aviation Administration and the North Carolina Department of Transportation's Division of Aviation issued warnings and restrictions to prevent aerial accidents, including issuing temporary flight restrictions for drones, implementing prior permission request lines, creating temporary airspace coordination areas, creating Standard-use Army Aircraft Flight Routes, and deploying temporary air traffic control towers. The restrictions followed a report of about 30 mid-air close calls over North Carolina on September 28 alone, along with at least two supply-drop incidents involving private aircraft—one in which a plane's landing gear failed to deploy before landing at Hickory Regional Airport, temporarily closing the runway, and another in which a plane caught fire.

On October 4, Elon Musk claimed in a post on X that FEMA was not allowing SpaceX personnel to deliver Starlink terminals to areas affected by Helene and that the airspace had been shut down. Roughly an hour later, Secretary of Transportation Pete Buttigieg responded to Musk on X by rejecting his claims, saying that the "FAA doesn't block legitimate rescue and recovery flights" and offering to discuss any potential issues over the phone. Musk then later posted on social media that he'd talked to Buttigieg and thanked him for talking with him and subsequently commented that Buttigieg had resolved the issue.

On October 5, Florida Governor Ron DeSantis issued an executive order requiring debris management sites and landfills in all affected counties to remain open 24/7 to expedite debris removal ahead of Hurricane Milton's landfall. The order also increased the number of Florida National Guardsmen working on debris removal from 800 to 4,000 in an effort to prevent the debris from becoming a hazard ahead of Milton's anticipated landfall.

Milton dumped 16 in (410 mm) of rain on Hillsborough County, following its landfall south of the Tampa Bay area, near Siesta Key, as a Category 3 hurricane on October 9. Flooding, along with additional damage, adversely affected Helene cleanup efforts in the region. In response, Bay Area nonprofits expanded their relief work. Additional federal disaster assistance was also made available to Florida to supplement recovery efforts in the areas affected by Milton.

Florida recorded a rise in cases of Vibrio vulnificus (a flesh-eating bacterium that favors warm waters and spreads in heavy flood rains) following Hurricane Helene, which Hurricane Milton exacerbated. Before Helene, six cases had been reported in September; by the end of the month, that number had risen to 24. As of October 18, there were 38 confirmed cases statewide, equaling the total number of cases in 2024 prior the hurricanes.

In July 2026, FEMA approved $197 million for several projects across North Carolina.

=== Political response ===
President Biden was criticized by Republican presidential nominee Donald Trump and other Republican politicians for visiting Rehoboth Beach, Delaware, over the weekend instead of being at the White House commanding the federal response. Biden disputed claims that he was not helping to command the federal response to the disaster and stated that he had been doing so over the phone. Biden also said that he might have to ask Congress to return to Washington, D.C., to pass supplemental funding for the federal government's response to Helene. Biden promised to visit the emergency operations center in Raleigh on October 2 before embarking on an aerial tour of Asheville before visiting Georgia and Florida "as soon as possible after that". Democratic Party presidential nominee, Vice President Kamala Harris also promised to be "on the ground" as soon as possible without interrupting emergency response operations. On September 30, Harris boarded Air Force Two en route to Joint Base Andrews to visit FEMA headquarters in Washington, D.C., for a briefing on support for emergency response and recovery efforts from the results of Hurricane Helene.

In response to reporters' questions about the relation between climate change and the hurricane's severity, the head of FEMA, Deanne Criswell, said climate change made the storm significantly worse. Later, when reporters asked President Biden if climate change is to blame for the damage done by the hurricane he answered: "Absolutely, positively, unequivocally, yes, yes, yes, yes."

On September 30, Republican presidential nominee Donald Trump visited Valdosta, Georgia and alleged that Georgia's Republican governor, Brian Kemp, was "having a hard time getting the president [Joe Biden] on the phone. Federal government is not being responsive." Biden responded that Trump was "lying" as Biden said he had spoken to Kemp. The federal government was "doing everything possible", while Kemp said that Biden "just called me yesterday afternoon [on September 29] — I missed him and called him right back ... [Biden] just said, 'Hey, what do you need?' And I told him, 'You know, we got what we need, we will work through the federal process.' He offered that if there's other things we need, just to call him directly, which, I appreciate that. But we've had FEMA embedded with us since, you know, a day or two before the storm hit." Trump also claimed without providing evidence on his social media platform, Truth Social, that the federal government and North Carolina Governor Roy Cooper were "going out of their way to not help people in Republican areas".

On October 1, the U.S. senators from North Carolina, South Carolina, Georgia, Florida, Tennessee, and Virginia wrote a letter to Senate leadership urging action to help their states, even if it meant returning early from the fall recess. However, a day later, Speaker of the House Mike Johnson said that lawmakers would not return early, saying that, "We wouldn't even conceivably have the request ready before we get back in November" due to uncertainties about the cost of the disaster and that there was "no necessity" for a return. Secretary of Homeland Security Alejandro Mayorkas said that the costly relief effort would use most of FEMA's funding for the year and that the agency would be unprepared for another major disaster. That same day, Lieutenant Governor of North Carolina Mark Robinson, tweeted claims that Biden had told reporters that there were "no more supplies" for North Carolinians that were affected by the storm. When asked for proof of the comment being said, reporters were given a video clip of Biden on September 29 responding to a question about any additional supplies being made available, with Biden stating "no, we have pre-planned a significant amount of [resources], even though they hadn't asked for it yet."

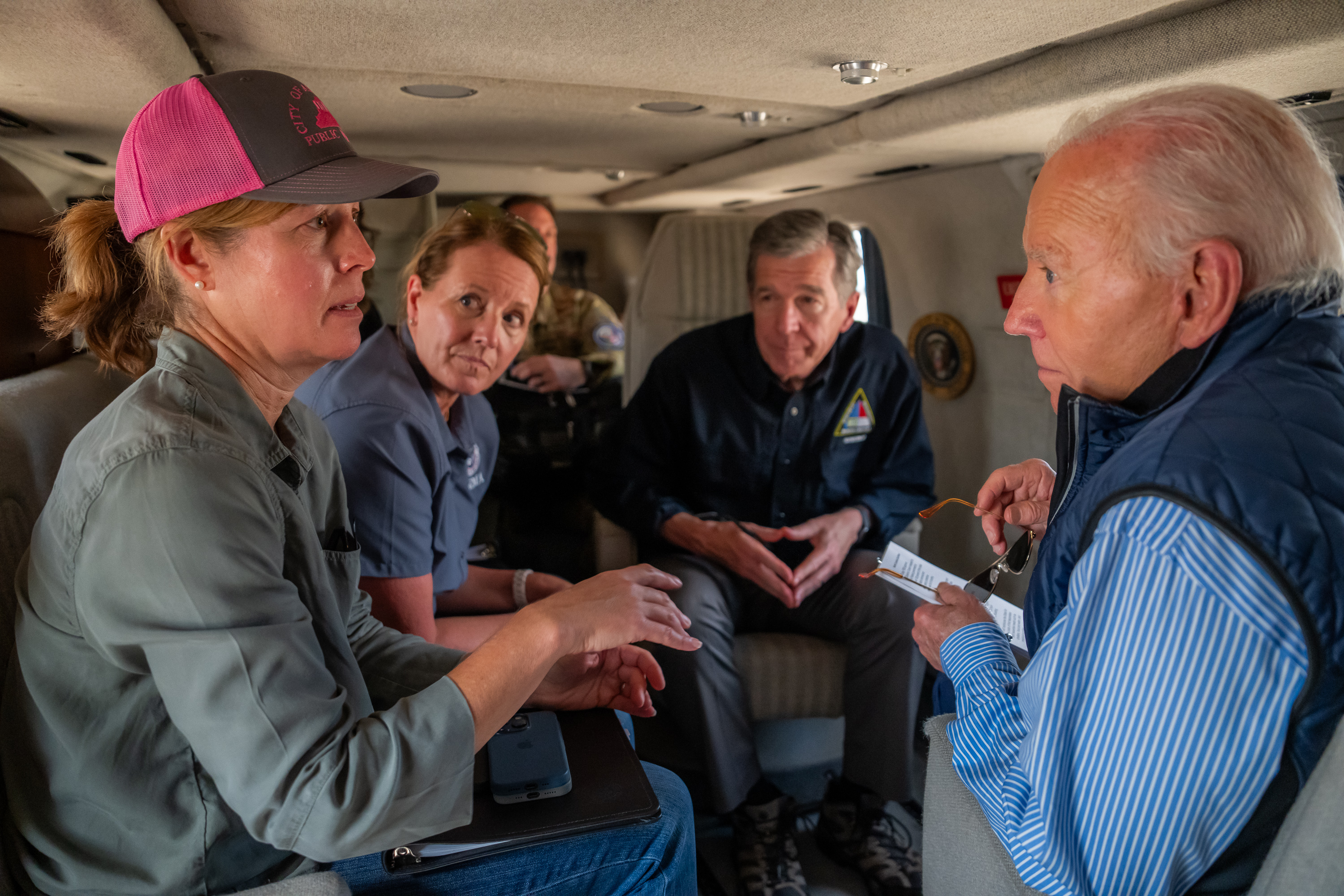
(From left to right) Asheville Mayor Esther Manheimer, FEMA director Deanne Criswell, North Carolina Governor Roy Cooper, and President Joe Biden speak during an aerial tour to survey damage caused by Hurricane Helene aboard Marine One on October 2, 2024

On October 2, President Biden flew to Greenville-Spartanburg International Airport aboard Air Force One and met with South Carolina officials such as Senator Lindsey Graham and Governor Henry McMaster to discuss the federal response to Helene in the state before boarding Marine One and traveling to North Carolina to embark on an aerial tour of Asheville and Lake Lure. Biden was joined by North Carolina Governor Roy Cooper, Asheville Mayor Esther Manheimer, FEMA director Deanne Criswell, and Homeland Security Advisor Elizabeth Sherwood-Randall. According to Alejandro Mayorkas, the tour was done from the air using Marine One not to impede the emergency response on the ground. Biden also ordered the Department of Defense to deploy up to 1,000 active-duty troops to assist with aid efforts. After Biden's visit, Graham said in a press conference that Biden needed to intervene in the port strike due to it potentially jeopardizing the relief efforts in the Carolinas. McMaster said that he and Graham also suggested to Biden during his visit that he intervene in the strike as well. Vice President Kamala Harris visited Augusta, Georgia, and spoke with residents of the city whom Helene impacted. Harris met with Augusta residents, handed out supplies, spoke about ongoing relief efforts, and thanked local and state officials such as Augusta Mayor Garnett Johnson. Harris also visited a Red Cross relief center where she received a briefing from local officials about the situation.

On October 3, President Biden flew to Tallahassee International Airport aboard Air Force One, where he then embarked on another aerial tour aboard Marine One of impacted areas while en route to Perry. From Perry, Biden then traveled via motorcade to Keaton Beach, where he was joined by Senator Rick Scott and other local officials. Biden spoke to a couple whose home had been destroyed by storm surge and discussed the impacts of the storm with local emergency management officials before returning to Perry, where he boarded Marine One and then flew to Moody Air Force Base in Georgia. From Moody Air Force Base, Biden traveled to Shiloh Pecan Farm southwest of Ray City where he said it was time to put aside "rabid partisanship" to help get people relief. Secretary of Agriculture Tom Vilsack accompanied Biden at the farm, and he spoke about federal programs to help farmers recover. Also on October 3, Representative Marjorie Taylor Greene posted online a map showing many Republican-leaning areas affected by Hurricane Helene, stating that "hurricane devastation could affect the election", then separately stated: "Yes they can control the weather ... It's ridiculous for anyone to lie and say it can't be done"; the precise meaning of this statement has not been confirmed.

On October 3, Trump falsely accused the Biden administration of spending FEMA funds meant for disaster relief "on illegal migrants", and thus having "stole the FEMA money just like they stole it from a bank"; he repeated the accusations the next day, which the Biden administration claimed was "poison". FEMA stated they have separate Congress-approved funds for disaster relief and for migrants (the Shelter and Service Program).

On October 7, the North Carolina Board of Elections unanimously passed an emergency resolution to ease voting rules for the 13 counties most affected by the hurricane. The goal is to ensure voters in those counties can still cast their ballot by providing alternative polling sites, an easy process for requesting or replacing absentee ballots, and giving more options for voters to return their ballots.

Donald Trump delivers remarks in North Carolina in January 2025.

On January 24, 2025, President Trump visited North Carolina and met with officials and residents. Trump said that he planned to sign an executive order to begin a process of reforming and overhauling FEMA, or perhaps even getting rid of the agency altogether. While in Fletcher, Trump suggested that state governments handle disasters that occur within them. In April, with the support of North Carolina's Republican Congressional delegation, Governor Josh Stein appealed FEMA's decision to deny a 180-day extension on the federal government's payment for disaster relief. In May, FEMA denied the appeal.

==== Congressional investigations of Helene and Milton ====
Between November 2024 and March 2025, the United States Congress held four separate televised investigative hearings on the federal government's response to, overall recovery efforts from, and criminal events by FEMA employees following Helene and Hurricane Milton a few weeks later.

== Retirement ==
Following the storm's devastating effects in the Southeastern United States, the name Helene was retired by the World Meteorological Organization during the 47th Session of the RA IV Hurricane Committee on April 2, 2025, and will never be used again for an Atlantic hurricane. It was replaced by Holly in the list, which is scheduled to be used during the 2030 season.

== See also ==
- Weather of 2024
- Tropical cyclones in 2024
- Timeline of the 2024 Atlantic hurricane season
- List of Florida hurricanes (2000–present)
- List of Georgia hurricanes
- List of North Carolina hurricanes (2000–present)
- List of South Carolina hurricanes
