= Falling Creek Falls (disambiguation) =

Falling Creek Falls may refer to:

- Falling Creek Falls, a 10-foot waterfall in Columbia County, Florida on a 76-acre property currently jointly managed by the Suwannee River Water Management District and Columbia County
- Fall Creek Falls, a large waterfall in Tennessee
- Fall Creek Falls (Douglas County, Oregon), a 120 ft (37 m) waterfall in the North Umpqua River corridor.
