= Hurricane Debby =

Category 1 Atlantic hurricane

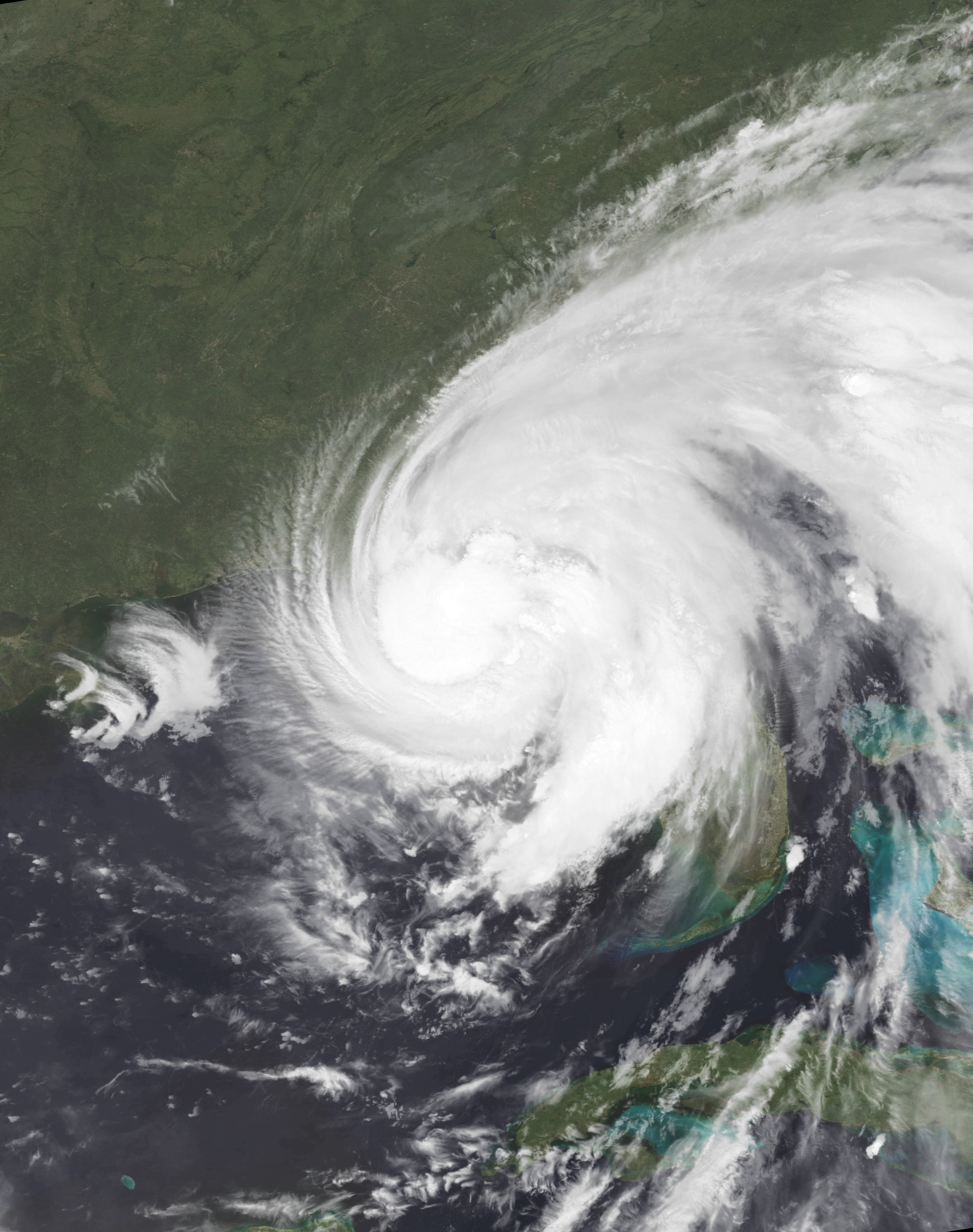
- Debby near landfall in Florida at peak intensity early on August 5

Meteorological history
- Formed: August 3, 2024
- Extratropical: August 8, 2024
- Dissipated: August 11, 2024

Category 1 hurricane
- 1-minute sustained (SSHWS/NWS)
- Highest winds: 80 mph (130 km/h)
- Lowest pressure: 979 mbar (hPa); 28.91 inHg

Overall effects
- Fatalities: 18 total
- Damage: $4.5 billion (2024 USD) (Costliest tropical cyclone in Canadian history)
- Areas affected: Caribbean; East Coast of the United States (particularly Florida, Georgia, and the Carolinas); Quebec, Atlantic Canada
- Part of the 2024 Atlantic hurricane season

Hurricane Debby was a slow-moving, erratic, and destructive tropical cyclone that caused widespread and severe flooding across the Eastern United States and portions of Eastern Canada, becoming the costliest natural disaster in the history of the Canadian province of Quebec. The fourth named storm and second hurricane of the 2024 Atlantic hurricane season, Debby developed from a tropical wave that was first noted by the National Hurricane Center (NHC) on July 26. After crossing the Greater Antilles, the system began to organize over Cuba and was designated a potential tropical cyclone on August 2. After exiting off the southern coast of Cuba, the disturbance organized into a tropical depression early on August 3.

Later that day, it became Tropical Storm Debby while traversing the Florida Straits. It moved northwards and gradually intensified into a Category 1 hurricane before making landfall near Steinhatchee, Florida, early on August 5. Debby weakened once inland and began to slow down over the Southeastern United States, causing widespread flooding from heavy rain. After re-emerging over the Atlantic on August 7, Debby transitioned into a subtropical storm before slowly moving northwards again, making landfall in South Carolina early on August 8 before weakening and becoming post-tropical the next day. It continued inland over the United States before traversing Atlantic Canada, after which it moved back out to sea.

States of emergency were declared for the states of Florida, Georgia, North Carolina, South Carolina, and Virginia ahead of the storm. Heavy rainfall was exacerbated by Debby's slow motion, with accumulations peaking near 20 inches (510 mm) near Sarasota, Florida as of August 7. Two dozen tornadoes were confirmed as the storm also moved up the East Coast of the United States. In Quebec, rainfall totals peaked at 8.7 inches (220 mm), generating destructive floods. In all, 18 fatalities have been attributed to the storm, and damages were totaled at US$4.5 billion.

== Meteorological history ==
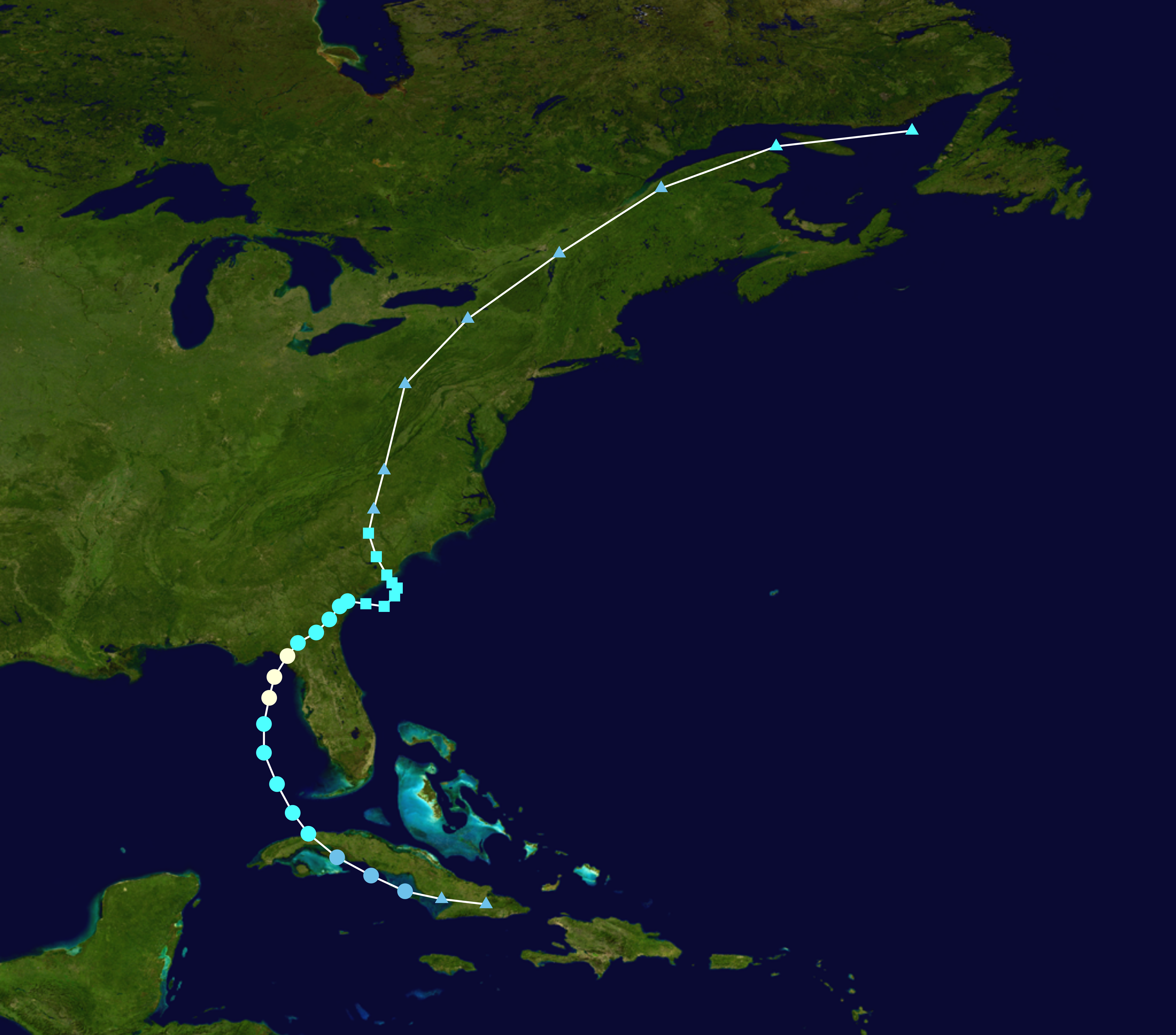
Map plotting the storm's track and intensity, according to the Saffir–Simpson scale Map key Saffir–Simpson scale Tropical depression (≤38 mph, ≤62 km/h) Tropical storm (39–73 mph, 63–118 km/h) Category 1 (74–95 mph, 119–153 km/h) Category 2 (96–110 mph, 154–177 km/h) Category 3 (111–129 mph, 178–208 km/h) Category 4 (130–156 mph, 209–251 km/h) Category 5 (≥157 mph, ≥252 km/h) Unknown Storm type Tropical cyclone Subtropical cyclone Extratropical cyclone, remnant low, tropical disturbance, or monsoon depression

The National Hurricane Center (NHC) began to monitor a tropical wave over the tropical Atlantic for potential tropical cyclogenesis at 18:00 UTC on July 26, as it moved eastward towards the Lesser Antilles and Greater Antilles. As the disturbance moved westward it crossed over the Virgin Islands, Puerto Rico, and Hispaniola, becoming increasingly defined by August 1. As the system moved over southeastern Cuba, it developed a broad circulation center and disorganized convective bands. Due to the potential threat of the storm to Florida, the NHC designated it as Potential Tropical Cyclone Four at 15:00 UTC on August 2.

After that, the disturbance moved off the southern coast of Cuba and formed a closed circulation, allowing the NHC to upgrade and designate it as Tropical Depression Four at 03:00 UTC on August 3. The depression than crossed over the western part of Cuba and entered the Gulf of Mexico, where it further intensified into Tropical Storm Debby later on August 3. Debby was a large system with a small core, initially inhibiting its ability to develop rapidly. Despite that, it continued to organize as it traversed the Gulf; though, intruding dry air slightly hindered development. As a result, late on August 4, Debby intensified into a hurricane.

Turning northeastwards slightly in response to a trough in the Northeastern United States, Debby approached the Big Bend area as it peaked with sustained winds of 80 mph (130 km/h) and a minimum pressure of 979 millibars (28.9 inHg) early on August 5. At 11:00 UTC that day, it made landfall in the Big Bend region near Steinhatchee, Florida. Tracking inland, just a few hours later, Debby weakened into a tropical storm. The forward speed of the cyclone began to slow as the aforementioned trough moved off shore and left Debby in light steering currents.

Debby moved offshore the coast of Georgia early on August 6 as a weak tropical storm, but eventually strengthened slightly to a secondary peak of 60 mph (97 km/h) as its broad nature prevented much in the way of intensification. On August 7, Debby transitioned into a subtropical storm. Turning slowly northwards again by late on August 7, Debby made landfall again near Bulls Bay, South Carolina, at 05:45 UTC on August 8. Steadily weakening once inland, the NHC passed responsibility for warnings to the Weather Prediction Center (WPC). On August 9, Debby became an extratropical cyclone. The remnants of Debby moved into Canada on August 10, before completely dissipating by the next day.

== Preparations ==
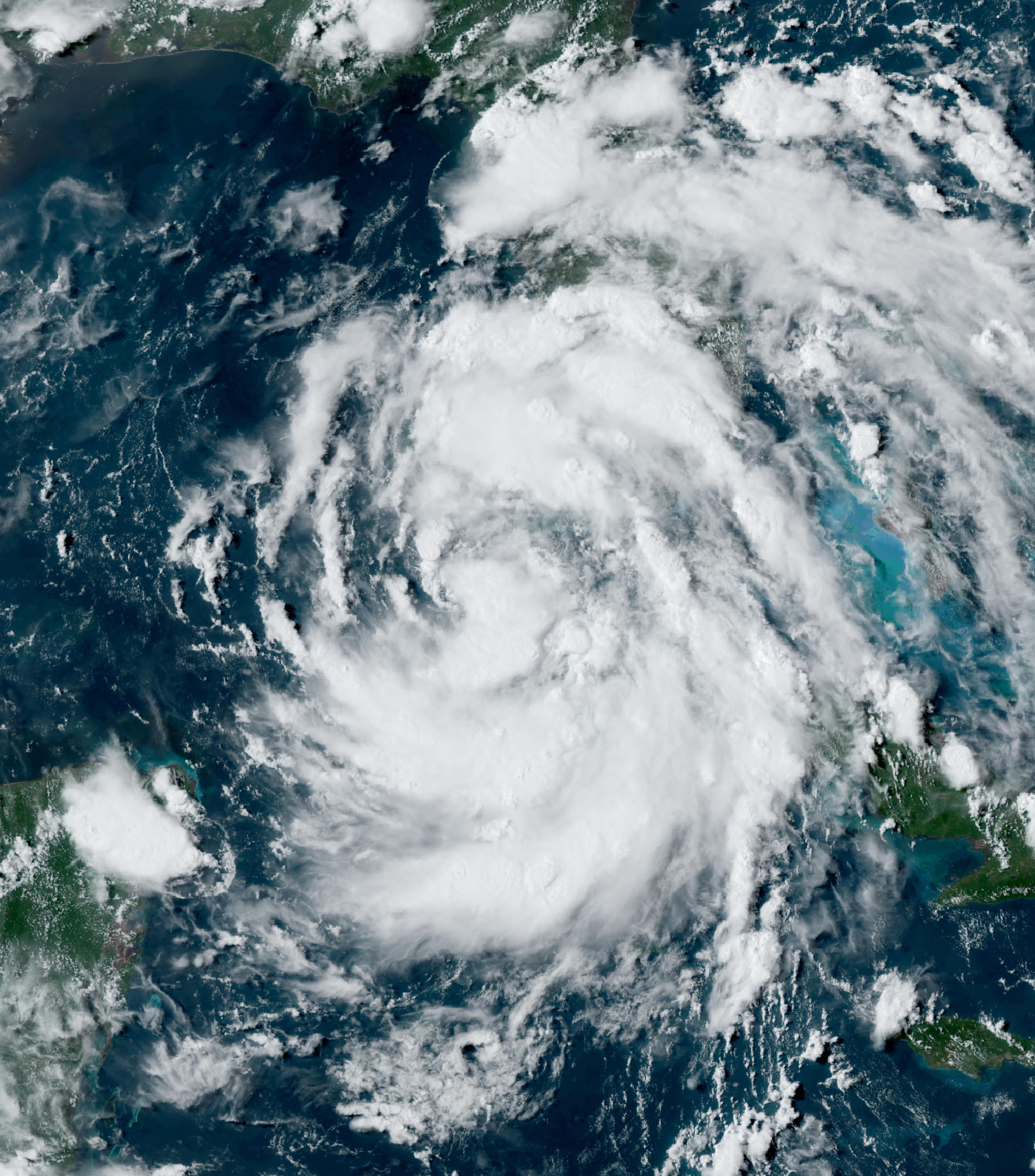
Tropical Storm Debby near the Florida Straits on August 3

=== United States ===
More than 1,000 flights had been canceled due to Debby, including 8% of American Airlines flights.

==== Florida ====
On July 31, NWS Miami began warning for potential excessive rainfall. The southern Florida Keys and Dry Tortugas were placed under a tropical storm warning. Another tropical storm warning was issued for areas from East Cape Sable to the Suwannee River. From Indian Pass to Mexico Beach, a third tropical storm warning was issued. On the east coast, a tropical storm warning was declared from the Florida-Georgia border to Ponte Vedra Beach. A hurricane warning was declared for areas in between the Suwannee River and Indian Pass. Ahead of Debby's landfall in Florida, the SPC issued a tornado watch along with a slight 5% tornado risk.

Governor Ron DeSantis declared a state of emergency for 61 counties of Florida. The governor also activated 3,000 members of the Florida National Guard. President Joe Biden approved a disaster declaration for the state August 4. The mayor of Gainesville issued a local state of emergency. Across the state, sandbagging locations opened up. More than 30,000 sandbags were distributed in Tampa. Pinellas County delayed a project to reverse beach erosion.

Leon County opened up six shelters. Lake County opened a shelter in an elementary school. In Franklin County, mandatory evacuations were issued for the barrier islands. Citrus County and Levy County also issued mandatory evacuations for their coastal regions. Several other counties issued voluntary evacuations. All state parks in Florida shut down as Debby approached and Carnival Cruise Line's Carnival Elation had its schedule modified.

==== Georgia and the Carolinas ====
Coastal Georgia was placed under storm surge and tropical storm warnings. Governor Brian Kemp declared a state of emergency in Georgia ahead of Debby on August 3. Sandbagging sites opened across coastal Georgia. Long County School District delayed their start date to August 8. Savannah-Chatham County Public Schools announced on August 4 that schools would dismiss early on Monday and be closed on Tuesday and Wednesday.

On August 4, Governor Henry McMaster declared a state of emergency in South Carolina as well as state Attorney General Alan Wilson enacting the state's price gouging law, which prohibits unfair prices during times of disaster. Marine warnings were issued for waters in the Beaufort and Hilton Head Island areas. At Congaree National Park, where 10–15 in (250–380 mm) of rain was forecast, the park closed August 5, with the park reopening on August 9. All parks in the city of Columbia closed as well. South Carolina suspended some interstate animal transport requirements. Around 50 first responders from Frederick, Howard, and Montgomery counties in Maryland, as well as Washington, D.C., were deployed to Charleston to aid in search and rescue efforts. Charleston implemented a curfew. Duke Energy warned customers to plan ahead and made a plan to send over 6,100 workers to respond to the storm.

Multiple National Weather Service offices in North Carolina issued flood watches for the southeastern areas of the state, and Governor Roy Cooper issued a state of emergency for the entire state.

==== Elsewhere ====
Portions of Pennsylvania were put under a flood watch on August 9. Hershey Park closed due to the storm on August 9.

Prior to the storm, the National Weather Service issued a wind advisory for New York City, with wind gusts of 50 mph (80 km/h) anticipated on the afternoon of August 9. The MTA installed pumps to alleviate water from the subway systems, to avoid a repeat of recent floods. The New York Racing Association cancelled races scheduled for August 9 at Saratoga Race Course due to the storm. The New York Yankees postponed their August 9 game against the Texas Rangers until the following day due the forecasted inclement weather.

== Impact ==
Costliest Non-retired Hurricanes
Rank	Cyclone	Season	Damage
1	Sally	2020	$7.3 billion
2	Isaias	2020	$5.02 billion
3	Imelda	2019	$5.0 billion
4	Debby	2024	$4.5 billion
5	Zeta	2020	$4.4 billion
6	Karl	2010	$3.9 billion
7	Idalia	2023	$3.6 billion
8	Isaac	2012	$3.11 billion
9	Delta	2020	$3.09 billion
10	Lee	2011	$2.8 billion

=== Caribbean ===
The precursor to Debby produced thunderstorms over Hispaniola, Puerto Rico, and The Bahamas. The National Weather Service issued flood warnings for 33 municipalities in Puerto Rico, mostly in the eastern half of the island. Debby brought heavy rainfall to western Cuba. Slick roads occurred in Havana, with the heaviest rainfall in the city occurring in Cerro. Rainfall in Artemisa Province peaked at 265 mm (10.4 in) at the Maurín Aqueduct in Bauta.

=== United States ===
KVAX loop of Hurricane Debby making landfall in Florida on August 5, 2024.

Amtrak modified the schedules for the Silver Service and Palmetto from August 6–8 and cancelled the August 6 and August 7 runs of the Auto Train due to the storm. Several Piedmont trains were cancelled on August 8–9 as well. Heavy rain, gusty winds and downed trees delayed dozens of trains in Mid-Atlantic and Northeastern United States on August 9. According to National Centers for Environmental Information (NECI), total damage across the United States was estimated at $2.5 billion.

==== Florida ====
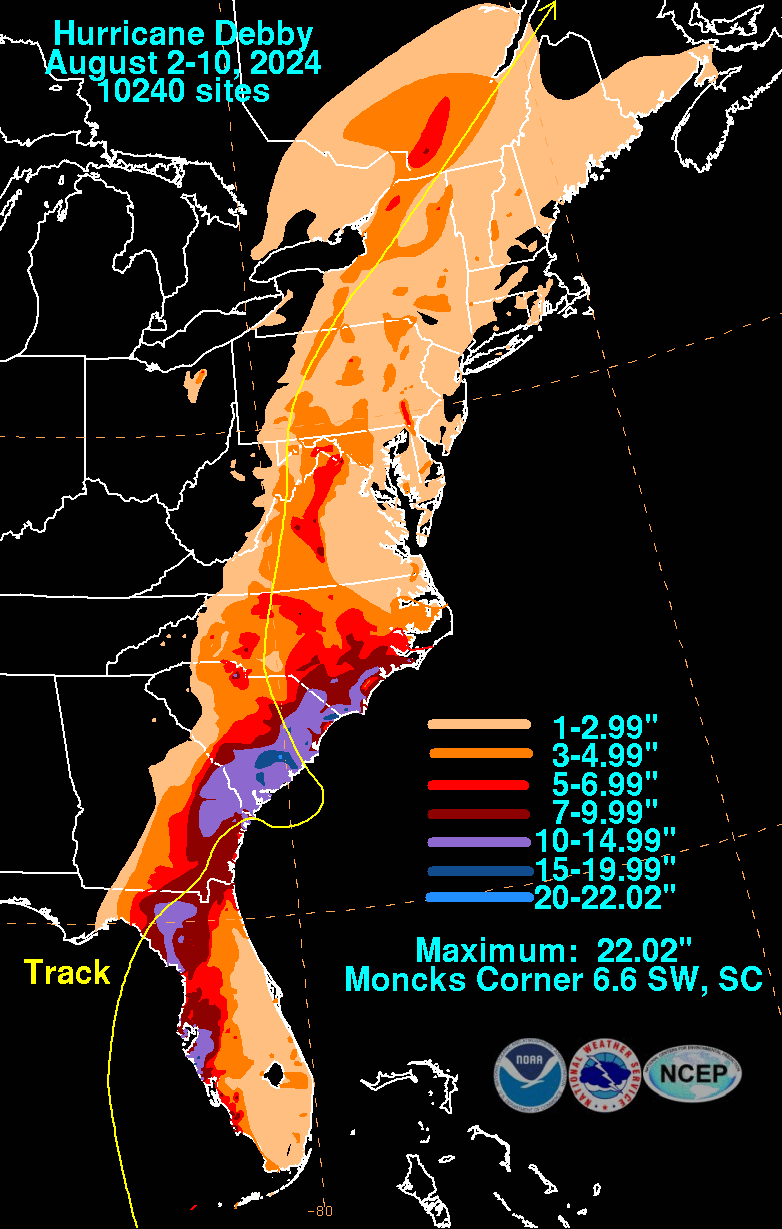
The maximum rainfall map and track for Hurricane Debby

The outer bands of Debby began impacting Central and South Florida on August 3, bringing gusty winds and rainfall. Several tornado warnings were issued throughout the state, including one for Broward County on August 3. A very brief EF1 tornado occurred in Union County. It overturned a trailer, unroofed a shed, and knocked down a wooden fence and a few trees. Sustained winds neared tropical storm force in Everglades City, though no major damage was reported.

More than 2 ft (0.6 m) of storm surge inundated Fort Myers Beach, where communities there were still recovering from the record storm surge from Hurricane Ian nearly 2 years prior, resulting in major flooding. Beach erosion caused road closures in Siesta Key. The city of Sarasota recorded over 20 in (510 mm). As Debby made landfall, almost 250,000 outages were reported. To aid in the response, Duke Energy pulled 350 workers from the Midwest. In Cocoa, Debby flipped five trailers.

Two people were killed and another were severely injured in a car accident in Dixie County due to the inclement weather caused by Debby. In Tampa, a 64-year-old trucker died after his semi-truck fell off I-275 into a canal. In Levy County, a 13-year-old boy was killed when a tree fell onto the mobile home he lived in. A 48-year-old man drowned off of Gulfport after his boat partially sunk after he attempted to ride out the storm on it. The man's dog survived.

Debby washed ashore 25 packages of cocaine at a beach in the Florida Keys, worth over $1 million, which is believed to have originated from nearby countries in the Caribbean known for drug trafficking. Damage in Manatee County was expected to surpass $13 million based on early estimates. Insured losses for the state is $66.7 million. A submerged car was spotted by a passerby in Phillippi Creek in Southgate on August 12. The Sarasota County Sheriff's Office recovered the vehicle and discovered the body of a 67-year-old man who went missing on August 6 during heavy flooding in the area.

==== Georgia and the Carolinas ====
In Georgia, around 47,000 customers lost power. A 19-year-old died in Moultrie after a tree fell on his home. Due to flooding along the Ogeechee River, officials in Effingham County issued a mandatory evacuation for roads along the river. The heaviest rain in the state fell in Blitchton, at 9.5 in (240 mm) in 24 hours.

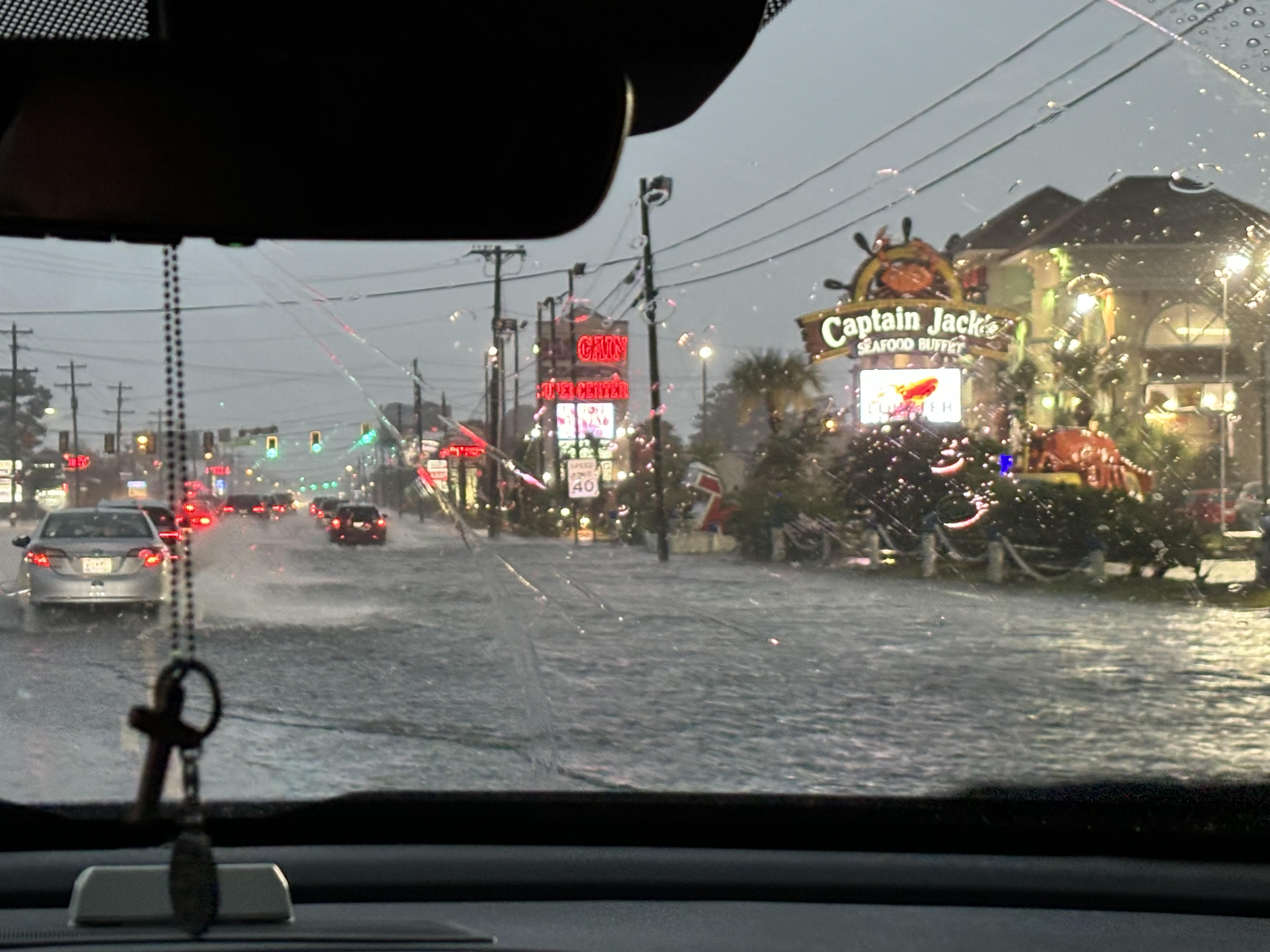
Floodwaters inundating US 17 in North Myrtle Beach, South Carolina.

Seven tornadoes were confirmed in South Carolina; four of them were rated EF1, while three were rated EF0. This included two EF1 tornadoes that impacted Edisto Beach; these tornadoes damaged several homes, some significantly, and snapped or uprooted dozens of trees. In Colleton County, fears developed surrounding a possible breach of the McGrady Dam. The sheriff office declared a mandatory evacuation. Heavy rainfall also caused flooding in parts of Charleston and parts of North Myrtle Beach. A flash flood emergency was issued in Moncks Corner on August 9.

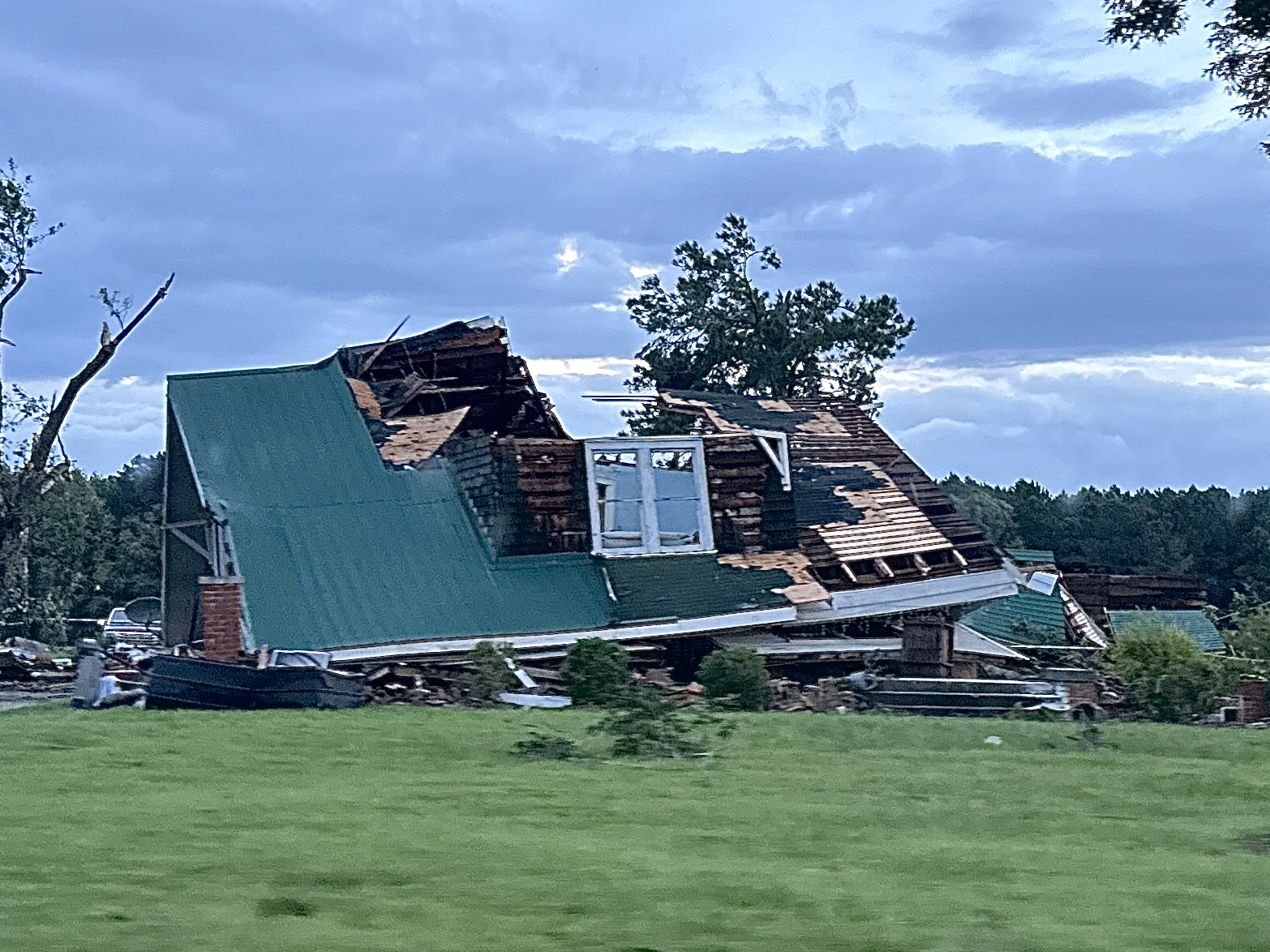
A house collapse which killed one, as a result of an EF3 tornado which touched down in Lucama, North Carolina during the storm

As part of the 2024 United States presidential election, Kamala Harris and her running mate Tim Walz planned to hold a political rally in Raleigh, North Carolina on August 8, as did Republican vice presidential nominee JD Vance; both rallies were postponed due to the hurricane. It was also announced on August 14 that the capital city's southern extension of NC 540 would not be opening to traffic, as planned for August 28, due to erosion in construction areas. North Carolina governor Roy Cooper deployed around 350 soldiers with 17 water rescue teams to the eastern and central parts of the state.

The strongest tornadoes produced by Debby occurred in North Carolina. Ten tornadoes touched down in the state, including three significant (EF2+) tornadoes. An EF2 tornado passed near Harrells, another EF2 tornado caused considerable damage in Greene County, and a low-end EF3 tornado collapsed a home and killed a person near Lucama. Three of the other tornadoes were rated EF1 while the remaining four were rated EF0. One other person was killed in Greensboro.

As of April 2025, FEMA has distributed $350 million in individual assistance for Georgia between Hurricanes Debby and Helene.

==== Elsewhere ====
In Virginia, the storm prompted closures in Shenandoah National Park. Three EF1 tornadoes occurred in the state; they knocked down trees and power poles and damaged numerous structures, including homes. Further north, Washington D.C. recorded 1.18 in (30 mm) of rain in just 30 minutes, with a 2.77 in (70 mm) event total. Winds in DC gusted to 40 mph (64 km/h). A 36-year-old woman died after an oak tree fell onto her home in Shannondale, West Virginia. Another falling tree also damaged a firetruck that responded to the scene along with power lines.

An EF0 tornado moved through Hedgesville, West Virginia, uprooting and snapping trees and downing tree branches. Another EF1 tornado occurred northwest of Stanton, Delaware, where a store and a light pole at a strip mall were damaged and trees were snapped or uprooted. In Delaware, rainfall totals on August 8 reached 6.31 in (160 mm), with 1.5 in (38 mm) in West Chester, Pennsylvania and 1.1 in (28 mm) of rain in Philadelphia. This was after heavy rains fell in the region from August 6–7.

19 people had to be rescued at Dover Township, Pennsylvania. Heavy rainfall prompted flash flood emergencies for several towns in Steuben and Allegany counties in New York, where over 4 in (100 mm) of rain fell; those same alerts extended into Westfield, Pennsylvania as well. In addition, multiple impassable roadways were reported in Binghamton, New York. A high-end EF1 tornado struck the eastern part of Harrisburg, Pennsylvania, severely damaging structures and knocking down trees. Another EF0 tornado uprooted trees near New Paltz, New York. Significant flooding also occurred in northeast Ohio, as an outer rain band associated with Debby dumped over 7 in (180 mm) of rain in just three hours. This caused the Cuyahoga River to flood and prompted a closure of I-76 near Barberton due to high water.

As the remnants of Debby passed through the inner eastern United States, winds gusted to 46 mph (74 km/h) in Islip. LaGuardia Airport imposed a ground stop during the storm. Flight cancellations reached 227 at LaGuardia, 174 at Newark Liberty International Airport and 173 at John F. Kennedy International Airport. Rail service was suspended on portions of Metro-North Railroad and on the Morris & Essex Lines.

Additionally, portions of coastal New England were faced with dangerous rip currents and sea swells, with the entire coastlines of Maine, Massachusetts, New Hampshire, and Rhode Island being issued a rip current statement by the National Weather Service. A tornado watch was issued in Litchfield County and Hartford County in Connecticut. Multiple trees were downed in Greenwich. Over 9,000 people were left without power in the state. In Vermont, winds of 60 miles per hour (97 km/h) affected the state. Owners of shops used sandbags and plastic to protect their businesses from the rainfall. Governor Phil Scott placed a Federal Emergency Declaration in the state prior to the arrival of Debby's remnants.

By August 10, over 170,000 people were still left without power across Ohio, Pennsylvania, New York, and Vermont.

=== Canada ===
Wettest tropical cyclones and their remnants in Canada Highest-known totals
Precipitation			Storm	Location	Ref.
Rank	mm	in	Storm	Location	Ref.
1	302.0	11.89	Harvey 1999	Oxford, NS	
2	249.9	9.84	Beth 1971	Halifax, NS	
3	238.0	9.37	Igor 2010	St. Lawrence, NL	
4	224.8	8.85	Matthew 2016	Sydney, NS	
5	221	8.70	Debby 2024	Lanoraie, QC	
6	213.6	8.41	Hazel 1954	Snelgrove, ON	
7	212.0	8.35	Fiona 2022	Cape North, NS	
8	210.0	8.26	Earl 2022	Paradise, NL	
9	191.0	7.52	Bertha 1990	Hunters Mountain, NS	
10	185.0	7.28	Sandy 2012	Charlevoix, QC	

The remnants of Debby left rainfall accumulations of 2.0 to 3.9 inches (50 to 100 mm) or more over Eastern Ontario and Southern Quebec, from the Ottawa region to Quebec City and the Côte-Nord region, with maximums of 5.1 to 7.4 inches (130 to 188 mm) in the Montreal and Laval metropolitan area. Mont-Tremblant in the Laurentians received 5.3 inches (134 mm), Trois-Rivières received 4.5 inches (114 mm) and the Charlevoix region received 3.4 inches (87 mm). The absolute maximum was recorded at Lanoraie with 8.7 inches (221 mm).

It was the rainiest single day ever measured in Montreal, with 6.1 in (154 mm) of rain falling on the city center on August 9. Further west, Ottawa International Airport set a daily rainfall record at 45.5 mm (1.79 in), with up to 83 mm (3.3 in) falling in parts of the city. Numerous basements and highway underpasses were flooded, more than 480,000 Quebec households lost electricity, and festivals were cancelled. Many smaller roads were also washed out. The La Ronde Amusement Park and Granby Zoo were closed due to the heavy rainfall from Debby.

In the Mauricie region of Quebec, an 80-year-old man fell in a river in Notre-Dame-de-Montauban on August 9. The Sûreté du Québec had to use drones and a helicopter to search along the Batiscan River, finding his body on August 11.

By August 20, around 70,000 insurance claims had been received by Québec insurers. In January 2025, the Insurance Bureau of Canada finalized the insurance damage caused by the remnants of Debby to be Can$2.7 billion (US$2 billion), and Debby became the costliest weather event in Quebec history, and the costliest tropical cyclone in the country, surpassing the record held by Fiona nearly two years prior.

== Aftermath ==
Officials in Steuben County, New York began recovery efforts after Debby had passed. They announced that they planned to distribute water bottles and clean-up kits to residents impacted by flash flooding on August 11–12. A shelter was opened and operated by the Red Cross at Corning-Painted Post High School for flood victims until August 12. Faith-based disaster relief organizations in Pennsylvania also mobilized to help assess damage and provide help to victims of Debby. Flooding rains at Watkins Glen State Park led to an indefinite closure of the Gorge Trail.

== See also ==
- Weather of 2024
- Tropical cyclones in 2024
- Timeline of the 2024 Atlantic hurricane season
- List of Florida hurricanes (2000–present)
- List of Georgia hurricanes
- List of South Carolina hurricanes
- List of North Carolina hurricanes (2000–present)
- List of Category 1 Atlantic hurricanes
- List of costliest Atlantic hurricanes
