= Falmouth, Florida =

- Unincorporated community
- Location within Florida Location within the United States
- Coordinates: 30°21′47″N 83°07′52″W
- Country: United States
- State: Florida
- County: Suwannee
- Elevation: 79 ft (24 m)
- Time zone: UTC-5 (Eastern (EST))
  - Summer (DST): UTC-4 (EDT)
- Area code: 386
- GNIS feature ID: 294760

Falmouth is an unincorporated community located in Suwannee County, Florida, United States.

There is one recreational area, known as Falmouth Spring. Falmouth Spring is a first-magnitude spring flowing about 160 cubic feet per second. It is located within a 276-acre recreation area managed by the Suwannee River Water Management District. The majority of the area is sandhill and upland mixed forest, with some slash pine. Because it disappears underground shortly after bubbling up, Falmouth Spring has been called the world's smallest river.

Falmouth is the birthplace of Dan White (March 25, 1908 – July 7, 1980), Award-winning American actor in vaudeville, theater, radio, film and television.
