= Mattair Springs =

Natural spring in Florida

Coordinates: 30.3768°N 82.9008°W

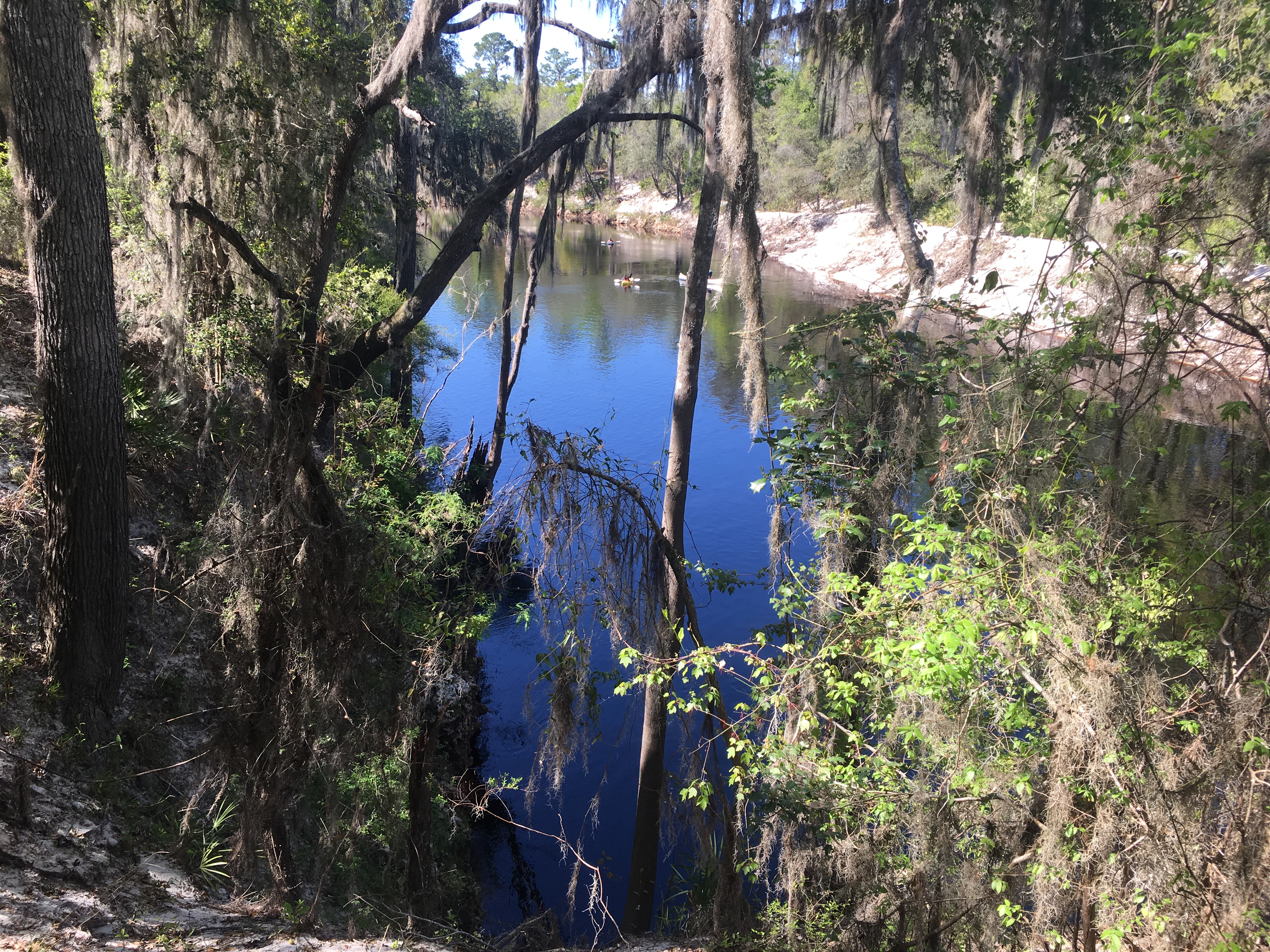
Suwannee River around Mattair Springs

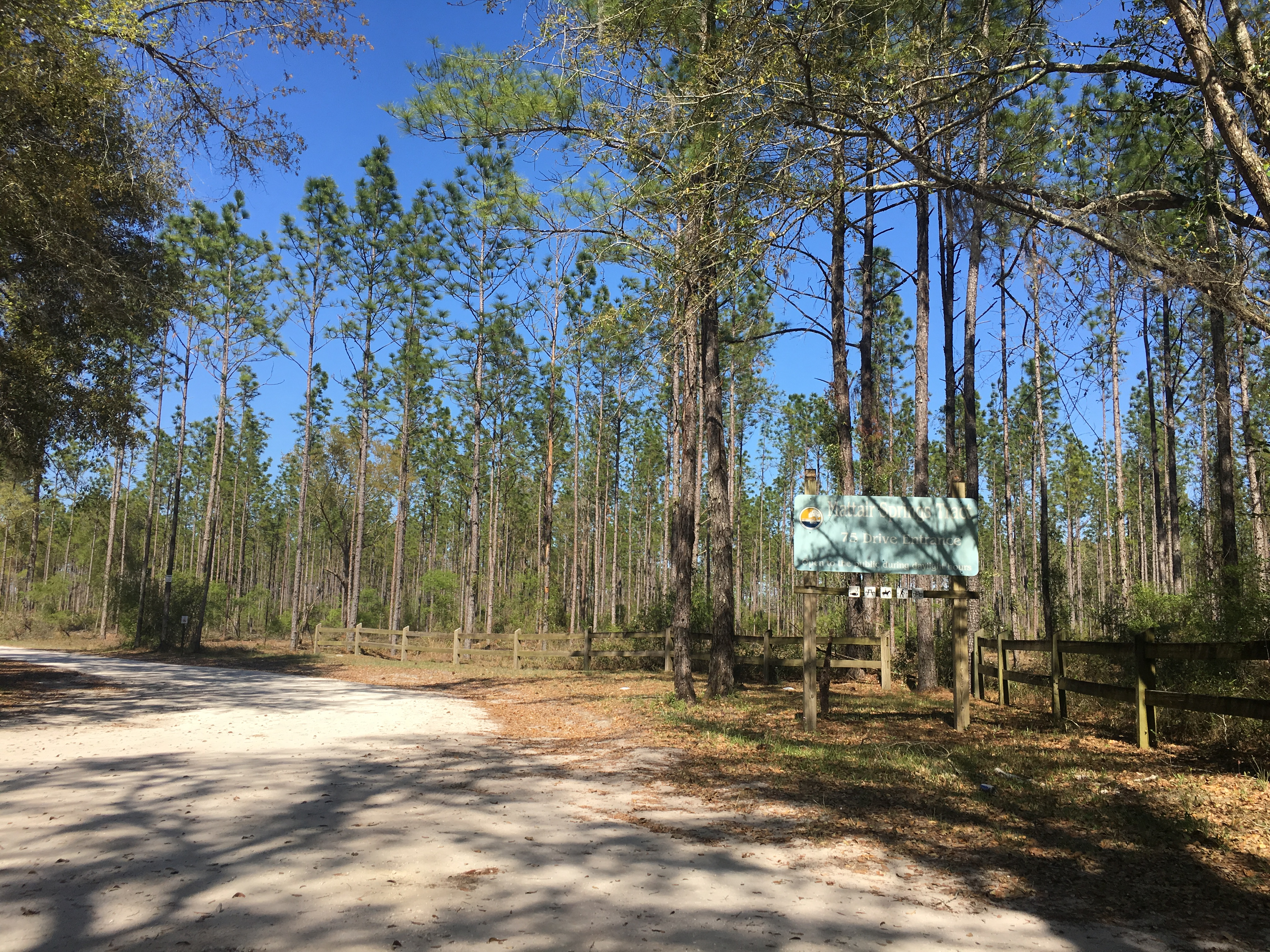
Entrance to Mattair Springs

Mattair Springs is a natural spring and 1,188-acre (481-hectare) preserve in northeastern Suwannee County, Florida. It is managed by the Suwannee River Water Management District. The property includes upland mixed forest, pine plantations, and sandhills. The sandhill areas are undergoing restoration. Camp Branch is a 200-acre (81-hectare) tract nearby. It includes slope forest, xeric hammock, upland mixed forest, bottom land forest and sandhill habitats. Wildlife in the area include gopher tortoise, Suwannee cooter, deer, turkey, and squirrel. Hooded pitcher plants and cedar elm are also present. The Florida Trail passes through the area.

There are two horse trails at Mattair Springs, a perimeter trail marked with white diamonds and an interior trail marked with yellow diamonds. The property also offers wildlife viewing, hiking, and bicycling on trails and administrative roads.

== See also ==
- List of Florida state parks
- List of Florida state forests
- Water management districts in Florida
