= List of geomorphological units in Florida =

Geomorphological units in Florida

The Florida Geological Survey has designated 10 geomorphological districts and 71 geomorphological provinces in Florida. The districts share topography that has been produced by related processes. Provinces have shared features that have a common origin. Some of the districts and provinces in northern Florida are only partly in Florida, extending into Georgia or Alabama.

Geomorphological units in Florida
District	Province	Page in Atlas
Southern Pine Hills	Panhandle Coastal Lowlands	17–19
Southern Pine Hills	Western Highlands	20–21
Apalachicola Delta	Lower Delta	25–27
Apalachicola Delta	Upper Delta	28–30
Dougherty Karst	Bonifay Karst Hills	34–35
Dougherty Karst	Compass Lake Karst Hills	36–38
Dougherty Karst	De Funiak Springs Karst Hills	39–40
Dougherty Karst	Mariana Karst Hills	41–43
Dougherty Karst	Sneads Karst Hills	44–45
Dougherty Karst	Vernon Karst Hills	46–48
Tifton Upland	Gadsden Hills	52–53
Tifton Upland	Madison Hills	54–55
Tifton Upland	Tallahassee Hills	56–57
Okeefenokee Basin	Lake City Ridge	60–61
Okeefenokee Basin	Ocean Pond Plain	62–63
Okeefenokee Basin	Raiford Ridges	64–65
Ocala Karst	Alachua Karst Hills	69–71
Ocala Karst	Bell Ridge	72–73
Ocala Karst	Branford Karst Plain	74–76
Ocala Karst	Brooksville Ridge	78–80
Ocala Karst	Chiefland Karst Plain	81–83
Ocala Karst	Crystal River Karst Plain	84–85
Ocala Karst	Fairfield Karst Hills	86–87
Ocala Karst	Green Swamp	88–90
Ocala Karst	Gulf Hammock	91–92
Ocala Karst	Land O'Lakes Karst Plain	93–95
Ocala Karst	Ocala Karst Hills	96–97
Ocala Karst	Perry Karst Plain	98–100
Ocala Karst	San Pedro Bay	101–102
Ocala Karst	Tsala Apopka Plain	103–105
Ocala Karst	Waccasassa Flats	106–107
Ocala Karst	Williston Karst Plain	108–109
Ocala Karst	Woodville Karst Plain	110–111
Lakes	Crfescent City Ridge	115–116
Lakes	Deland Ridge	117–118
Lakes	Fort McCoy Plain	119–120
Lakes	Hawthorne Lakes	121–123
Lakes	Lake Plain	124–125
Lakes	Lake Wales Ridge Complex	126–128
Lakes	Mount Dora Ridge	129–131
Lakes	Oklawaha River Valley	132–134
Lakes	Orlando Ridge	135–137
Lakes	Palatka Hill	138–139
Lakes	St. Johns River Offset	140–142
Lakes	Tavares Lakes	143–144
Lakes	Wekiva Plain	145–146
Barrier Island Sequence	Allapattah Flats	150–151
Barrier Island Sequence	Atlantic Coastal Complex	152–153
Barrier Island Sequence	Bombing Range Ridge	154–155
Barrier Island Sequence	Duval Upland	156–157
Barrier Island Sequence	Geneva Hill	158–159
Barrier Island Sequence	Lower St. Johns River Valley	160–162
Barrier Island Sequence	Osceola Plain	163–165
Barrier Island Sequence	Sea Islands	166–167
Barrier Island Sequence	St. Marys Plain	168–169
Barrier Island Sequence	Trail Ridge	170–171
Barrier Island Sequence	Upper St. Johns River Valley	172–173
Peace River	Hardee Upland	177–179
Peace River	Peninsular Coastal Lowlands	180–182
Peace River	Pinellas Ridge	183–184
Everglades	Atlantic Coastal Ridge	189–191
Everglades	Big Cypress	192–194
Everglades	Caloosahatchee Valley	195–196
Everglades	Everglades	197–199
Everglades	Florida Bay	200–201
Everglades	Immokalee Rise	202–203
Everglades	Lower Keys	204–206
Everglades	Okeechobee Plain	207–208
Everglades	Rock Glades	209–211
Everglades	Ten Thousand Islands	212–214
Everglades	Upper Keys	215–216
