= Thomas Goodbread =

Florida state legislator

Thomas Samuel Goodbread (April 22, 1836 – February 13, 1905) was a state legislator in Florida. His post office was in Esteinhatchee (now Steinhatchee) and he represented Lafayette County, Florida. He served in the Florida House of Representatives in 1881, 1883, and 1887.

He was born in Glynn County, Georgia. He married Louisiana Annie "Lucy" Peacock in 1852. He served in the American Civil War. He donated $1 to the Suwannee Baptist Association. Goodbread owned 20 enslaved people in Glynn County, GA, according to the 1860 slave census.
