= Water management districts in Florida =

The five water management districts in Florida are:

- Southwest Florida Water Management District nicknamed "Swiftmud" or SWFWMD
- South Florida Water Management District nicknamed "Softmud" or SFWMD
- Northwest Florida Water Management District (NWFWMD) stretching from the St. Marks River Basin in Jefferson County to the Perdido River in Escambia County
- St. Johns River Water Management District (SJRWMD)
- Suwannee River Water Management District (SRWMD)

District commissioners are nominated by the governor of the state, and approved by the state senate. They receive no pay.
