= Rip current =

Water current moving away from shore

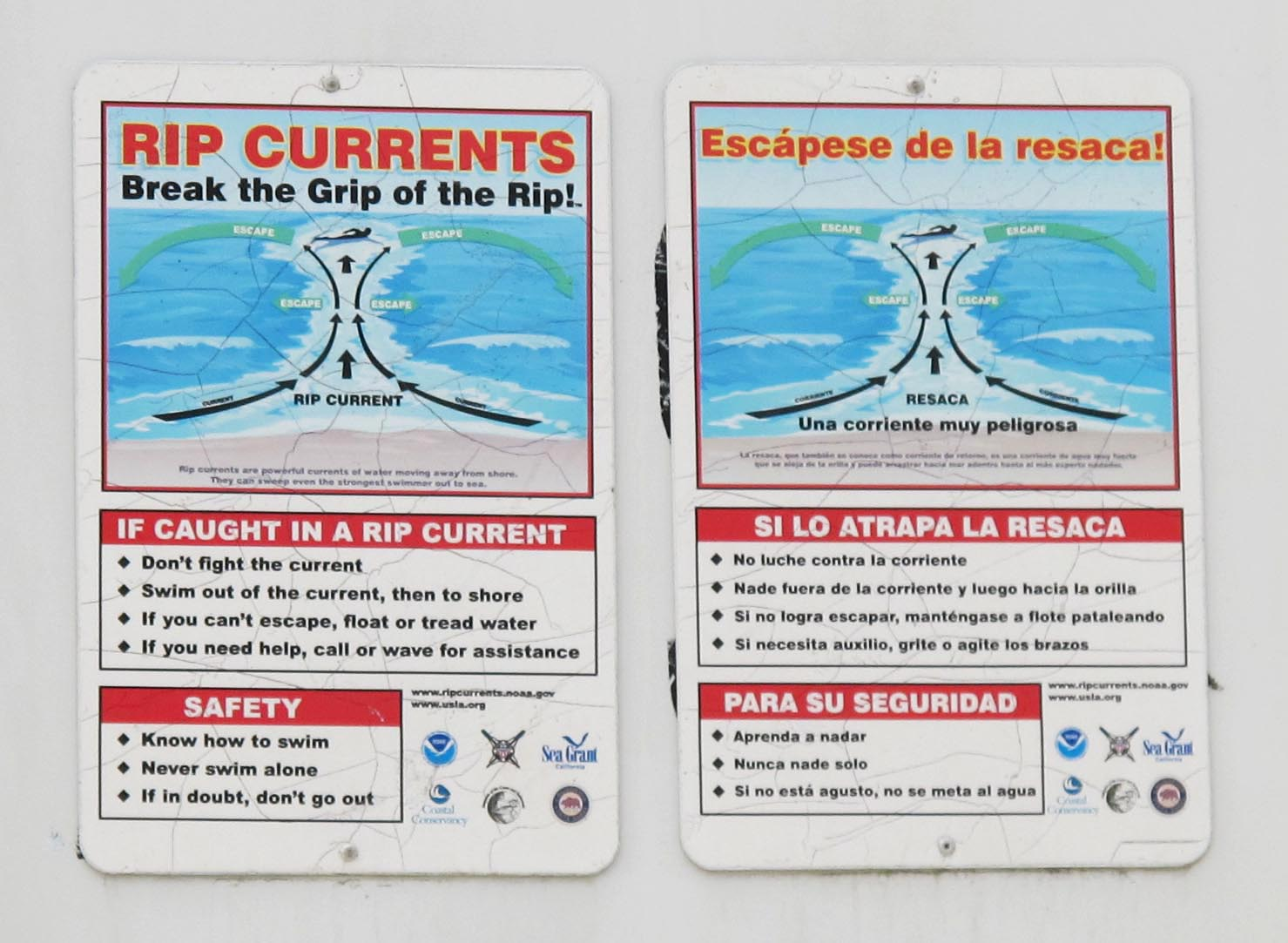
Signs explaining how to escape from a rip current, posted at Mission Beach, San Diego, California

As seen from above, this shows how a rip current works. Breaking waves cross a sand bar off the shore. The pushed-in water can most easily travel back out to sea through a gap in the sand bar. This flow creates a fast-moving rip current.

A rip current (or just rip) is a specific type of water current that can occur near beaches where waves break. A rip is a strong, localized, and narrow current of water that moves directly away from the shore, cutting through the lines of breaking waves, like a river flowing out to sea. The force of the current in a rip is strongest and fastest next to the surface of the water.

Rip currents can be hazardous to people in the water. Swimmers who are caught in a rip current and who do not understand what is happening, or who may not have the necessary water skills, may panic, or they may exhaust themselves by trying to swim directly against the flow of water. Because of these factors, rip currents are the leading cause of rescues by lifeguards at beaches. In the United States they have caused an average of 71 deaths by drowning per year between 2013 and 2022.

A rip current is not the same thing as undertow, the subsurface seaward current of water brought ashore by waves, with which a rip is sometimes confused. Contrary to popular belief, neither rip nor undertow can pull a person down and hold them under the water. A rip simply carries floating objects, including people, out to just beyond the zone of the breaking waves, at which point the current dissipates and releases everything it is carrying.

== Causes and occurrence ==
A rip current forms because wind and breaking waves push surface water towards the land. This causes a slight rise in the water level along the shore. This excess water will tend to flow back to the open water via the route of least resistance. When there is a local area which is slightly deeper, such as a break in an offshore sand bar or reef, this can allow water to flow offshore more easily, and this will initiate a rip current through that gap.

Water that has been pushed up near the beach flows along the shore towards the outgoing rip as "feeder currents". The excess water flows out at a right angle to the beach, in a tight current called the "neck" of the rip. The "neck" is where the flow is most rapid. When the water in the rip current reaches outside of the lines of breaking waves, the flow disperses sideways, loses power, and dissipates in what is known as the "head" of the rip.

Rip currents can form by the coasts of oceans, seas, and large lakes, whenever there are waves of sufficient energy. Rip currents often occur on a gradually shelving shore, where breaking waves approach the shore parallel to it, or where underwater topography encourages outflow at one specific area. Baïnes are one of the patterns identified to be producing rip currents. The location of rip currents can be difficult to predict. Some tend to recur always in the same places, but others can appear and disappear suddenly at various locations along the beach. The appearance and disappearance of rip currents is dependent upon the bottom topography and the direction from which the surf and swells are coming.

Rip currents occur wherever there is strong longshore variability in wave breaking. This variability may be caused by such features as sandbars, by piers and jetties, and even by crossing wave trains. They are often located in places where there is a gap in a reef, or low area on a sandbar. Rip currents, once they have formed, may deepen the channel through a sandbar.

Rip currents are usually quite narrow, but they tend to be more common, wider, and faster, when and where breaking waves are large and powerful. Local underwater topography makes some beaches more likely to have rip currents. A few beaches, such as the Hanakāpīʻai Beach, are notorious in this respect.

Although "rip tide" is a misnomer, in areas of significant tidal range, rip currents may only occur at certain stages of the tide, when the water is shallow enough to cause the waves to break over a sand bar, but deep enough for the broken wave to flow over the bar. In parts of the world with a big difference between high tide and low tide, and where the shoreline shelves gently, the distance between a bar and the shoreline may vary from a few meters to a kilometer or more, depending whether it is high tide or low tide.

A fairly common misconception is that rip currents can pull a swimmer down, under the surface of the water. This is not true, and in reality a rip current is strongest close to the surface, as the flow near the bottom is slowed by friction.

The surface of a rip current can often appear to be a relatively smooth area of water, without any breaking waves, and this deceptive appearance may cause some beach-goers to believe that it is a suitable place to enter the water.

=== Technical description ===
A more detailed and technical description of rip currents requires understanding the concept of radiation stress. Radiation stress is the force (or momentum flux) that is exerted on the water column by the presence of the wave. When a wave reaches shallow water and shoals, it increases in height prior to breaking. During this increase in height, radiation stress increases, because of the force exerted by the weight of the water that has been pushed upwards.

To balance this, the local mean surface level drops. This is known as the "setdown". When the wave breaks and starts reducing in height, the radiation stress decreases as the amount of water that is elevated decreases. When this happens, the mean surface level increases—this is known as the "setup".

In the formation of a rip current, a wave propagates over a sandbar with a gap in it. When this happens, most of the wave breaks on the sandbar, leading to setup. The part of the wave that propagates over the gap does not break, and the setdown continues in that part. Because of this phenomenon, the mean water surface over the rest of the sandbar is higher than that which is over the gap. The result is a strong flow outward through the gap. This strong flow is the rip current.

The vorticity and inertia of rip currents have been studied. From a model of the vorticity of a rip current done at Scripps Institute of Oceanography, it was found that as a fast rip current extends away from shallow water, the vorticity of the current increases, and the width of the current decreases. This model acknowledges that friction plays a role and waves are irregular in nature. From data from Sector-Scanning Doppler Sonar at Scripps Institute of Oceanography, it was found that rip currents in La Jolla, California, lasted several minutes, that they reoccurred one to four times per hour, and that they created a wedge with a 45° arch and a radius of 200–400 meters (660–1,310 ft).

== Visible characteristics ==
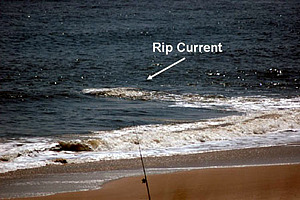
Much foam being carried out to sea in one narrow strip of water is often a visible sign of a rip current.

External videos
- What If You Were Caught in a Rip Current? - Youtube

Rip currents have a characteristic appearance, and, with some experience, they can be visually identified from the shore before entering the water. This is helpful to lifeguards, swimmers, surfers, boaters, divers and other water users, who may need to avoid a rip, or in some cases make use of the flow.

Rip currents often look somewhat like a road or river running straight out to sea. They are easiest to notice and identify when the zone of breaking waves is viewed from a high vantage point. The following are some visual characteristics that can be used to identify a rip:

- A noticeable break in the pattern of the waves – the water often looks flat at the rip, in contrast to the lines of breaking waves on either side of the rip.
- A "river" of foam – the surface of the rip sometimes looks foamy, because the current is carrying foam from the surf out to open water.
- Different color – the rip may differ in color from the surrounding water. It is often more opaque, cloudier, or muddier, and so, depending on the angle of the sun, the rip may show as darker or lighter than the surrounding water.
- It is sometimes possible to see that foam or floating debris on the surface of the rip is moving out, away from the shore. In contrast, in the surrounding areas of breaking waves, floating objects and foam are being pushed towards the shore.

These characteristics are helpful in learning to recognize and understand the nature of rip currents. Learning these signs can enable a person to recognize the presence and position of rips before entering the water, which is an important skill as studies show the majority of people are unable to identify a rip current and therefore unable to identify safe places to swim.

In the United States, some beaches have signs created by the National Oceanic and Atmospheric Administration (NOAA) and United States Lifesaving Association, explaining what a rip current is and how to escape one. These signs are titled, "Rip Currents; Break the Grip of the Rip". Two of these signs are shown in the image at the top of this article. Beachgoers can get information from lifeguards, who are always watching for rip currents, and who will move their safety flags so that swimmers can avoid rips.

== Danger to swimmers ==
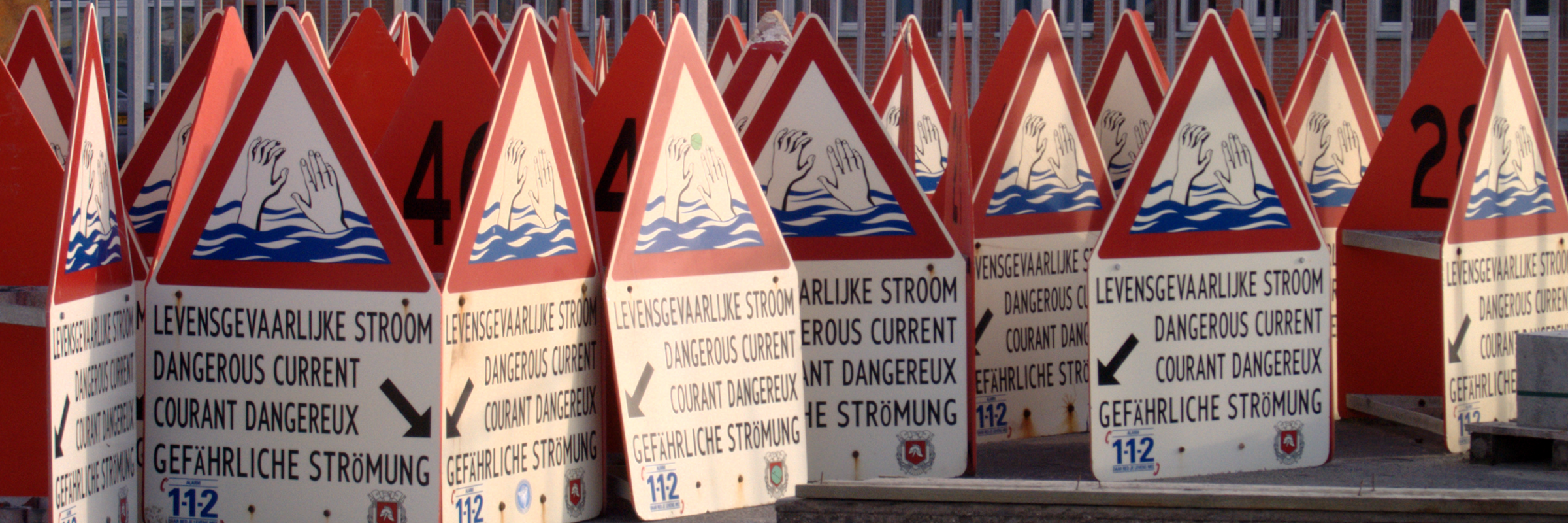
Stored rip current warning signs in the Netherlands.

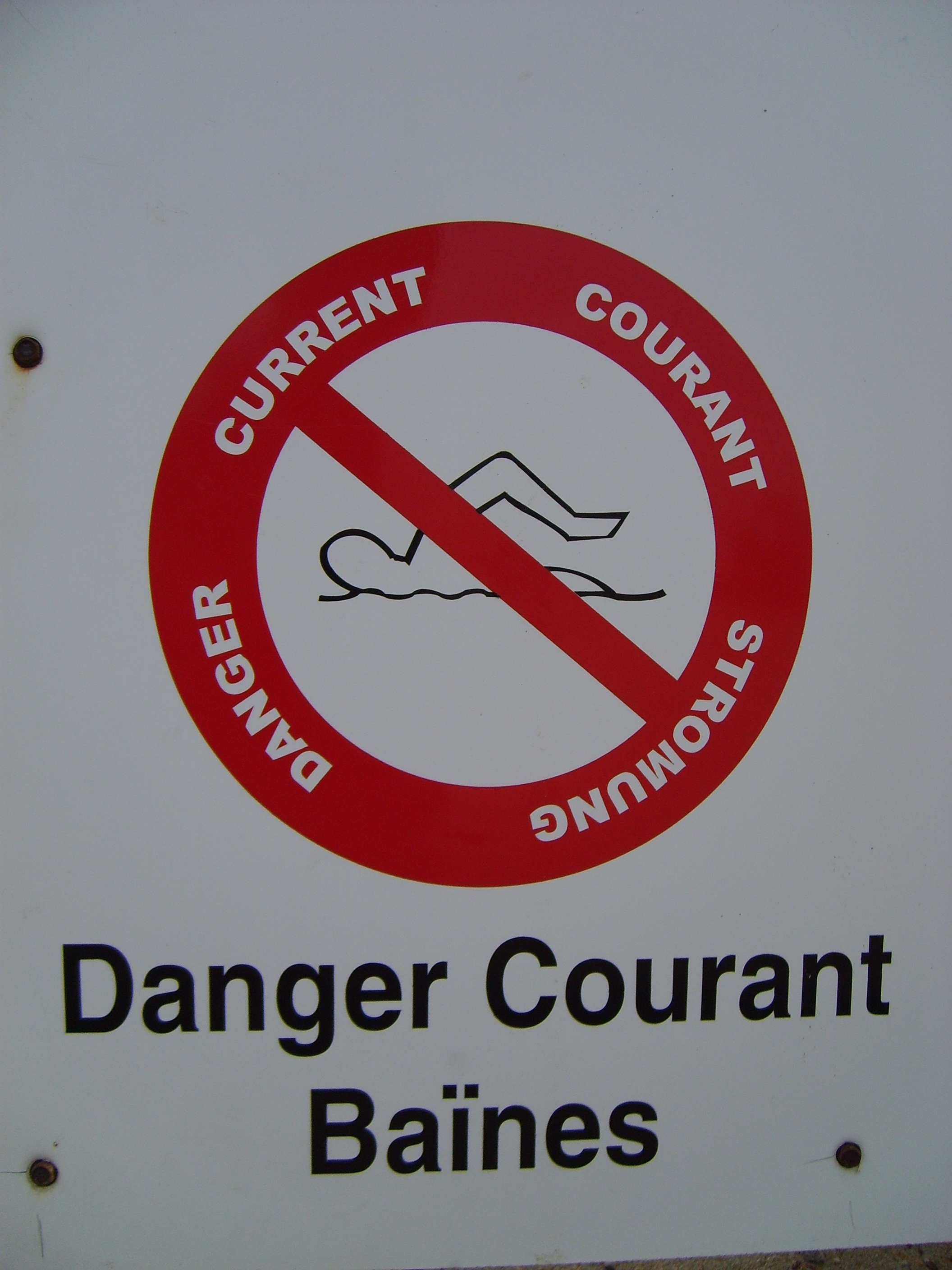
A warning sign in France

Rip currents are a potential source of danger for people in shallow water with breaking waves, whether this is in seas, oceans or large lakes. Rip currents are the proximate cause of 80% of rescues carried out by beach lifeguards.

Rip currents typically flow at about 0.5 m/s (1.6 ft/s). They can be as fast as 2.5 m/s (8.2 ft/s), which is faster than any human can swim. Most rip currents are fairly narrow, and even the widest rip currents are not very wide. Swimmers can usually exit the rip easily by swimming at a right angle to the flow, parallel to the beach. Swimmers who are unaware of this fact may exhaust themselves trying unsuccessfully to swim directly against the flow. The flow of the current fades out completely at the head of the rip, outside the zone of the breaking waves, so there is a definite limit to how far the swimmer will be taken out to sea by the flow of a rip current.

In a rip current, death by drowning occurs when a person has limited water skills and panics, or when a swimmer persists in trying to swim to shore against a strong rip current, and eventually becomes exhausted and drowns.

According to the NOAA rip currents caused an average of 71 deaths annually in the United States over the ten years ending in 2022 (with 69 in 2022).

A 2013 Australian study found that rips killed more people in Australia than bushfires, floods, cyclones and shark attacks combined.

=== Survival ===
People caught in a rip current may notice that they are moving away from the shore quite rapidly. Often, it is not possible to swim directly back to shore against a rip current, so this is not recommended. Contrary to popular misunderstanding, a rip does not pull a swimmer under the water. It carries the swimmer away from the shore in a narrow band of moving water.

A rip current is like a moving treadmill. Safety guidance commonly emphasizes remaining calm and avoiding exhausting attempts to swim directly against the current. Instead, swimmers are advised to swim parallel to the shoreline until free of the narrow offshore flow, then return to shore at an angle. If unable to escape by swimming, floating or treading water and signaling for help is often recommended until the current weakens or assistance arrives.

As an alternative, people who are caught in a strong rip can simply relax, either floating or treading water, and allow the current to carry them until it dissipates completely once it is beyond the surf line. Then the person can signal for help, or swim back through the surf, doing so diagonally, away from the rip and towards the shore.

It is essential for the safety of coastal swimmers to understand the danger of rip currents, to learn how to recognise them, and how to deal with them. It is advised, that people enter the water only in areas where lifeguards are on duty.

In a planned trial in a large rip current at Muriwai Beach in New Zealand, an Australian researcher from the School of Biological, Earth and Environmental Sciences, UNSW Sydney found that "just swim to the side" would not work as the rip current was too wide to see its sides, and said that, despite a rescue boat being near, he was unable to relax and not panic. The current took him 300 meters (980 ft) along the beach in a channel feeding the rip current, and then 400 meters (1,300 ft) offshore at "speeds approaching those of swimming world records".

== Uses ==
Experienced water users, such as, surfers, body boarders, divers, surf lifesavers and kayakers, when they wish to get out beyond the breaking waves, will sometimes use a rip current as a rapid and effortless means of transportation.

== See also ==
- Cross sea
- Longshore drift
- Rip current statement – warnings issued by the U.S. National Weather Service
- Undertow (water waves)
- Rip tide
- Baïne
