= Jena, Florida =

- Unincorporated community
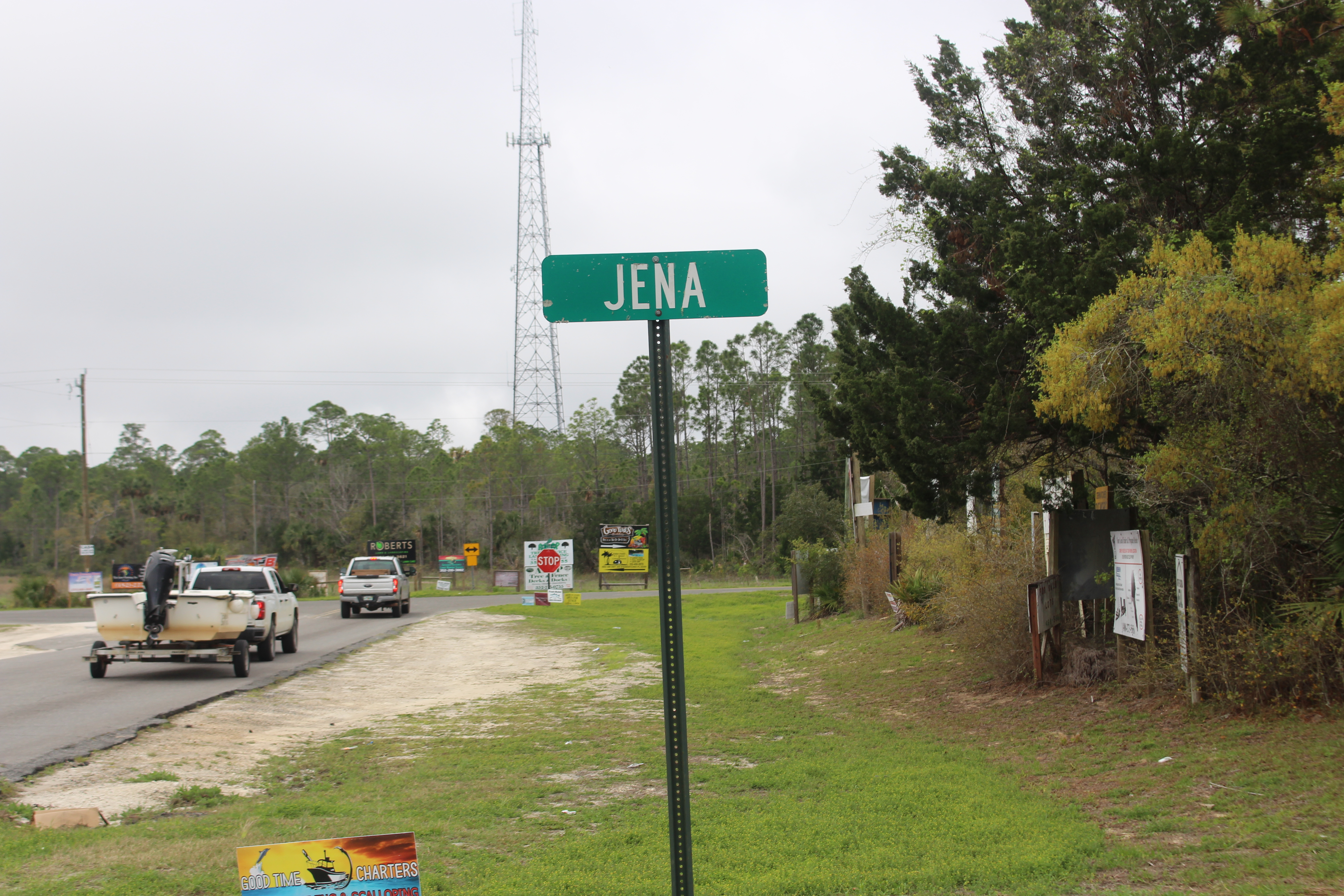
- Jena road sign

- Location within Florida Location within the United States
- Coordinates: 29°39′49″N 83°22′12″W
- Country: United States
- State: Florida
- County: Dixie

Area
  - Total: 26.718 sq mi (69.20 km^{2})
  - Land: 26.718 sq mi (69.20 km^{2})
  - Water: 0 sq mi (0 km^{2})
- Elevation: 13 ft (4.0 m)
- Time zone: UTC-5 (Eastern (EST))
  - Summer (DST): UTC-4 (EDT)
- ZIP code: 32359
- GNIS feature ID: 294816

Jena (/ˈdʒiːnə/ JEE-nuh, sometimes /ˈjeɪnə/ YAY-NA) is an unincorporated community on the southern shore of the Steinhatchee River, in Dixie County, Florida, United States, located 33 miles south of Perry. Although unincorporated, Jena has a post office and its ZIP code is 32359.

Jena is a port town that was sparsely populated until the early 1990s, when residential developers saw prospects for business amidst cheap land prices in northern Florida. The community is mostly single-family houses, but is home to a few businesses, such as Casey's Cove gas station and Restaurant, and Jena Pentecostal Holiness Church, which is the second oldest church in Florida. Jena is located just across the river from the larger resort destination of Steinhatchee.
