= Baïne =

Pool of water between a beach and the mainland

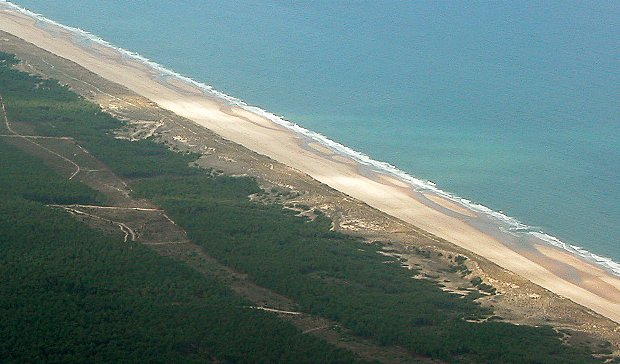
Baïnes

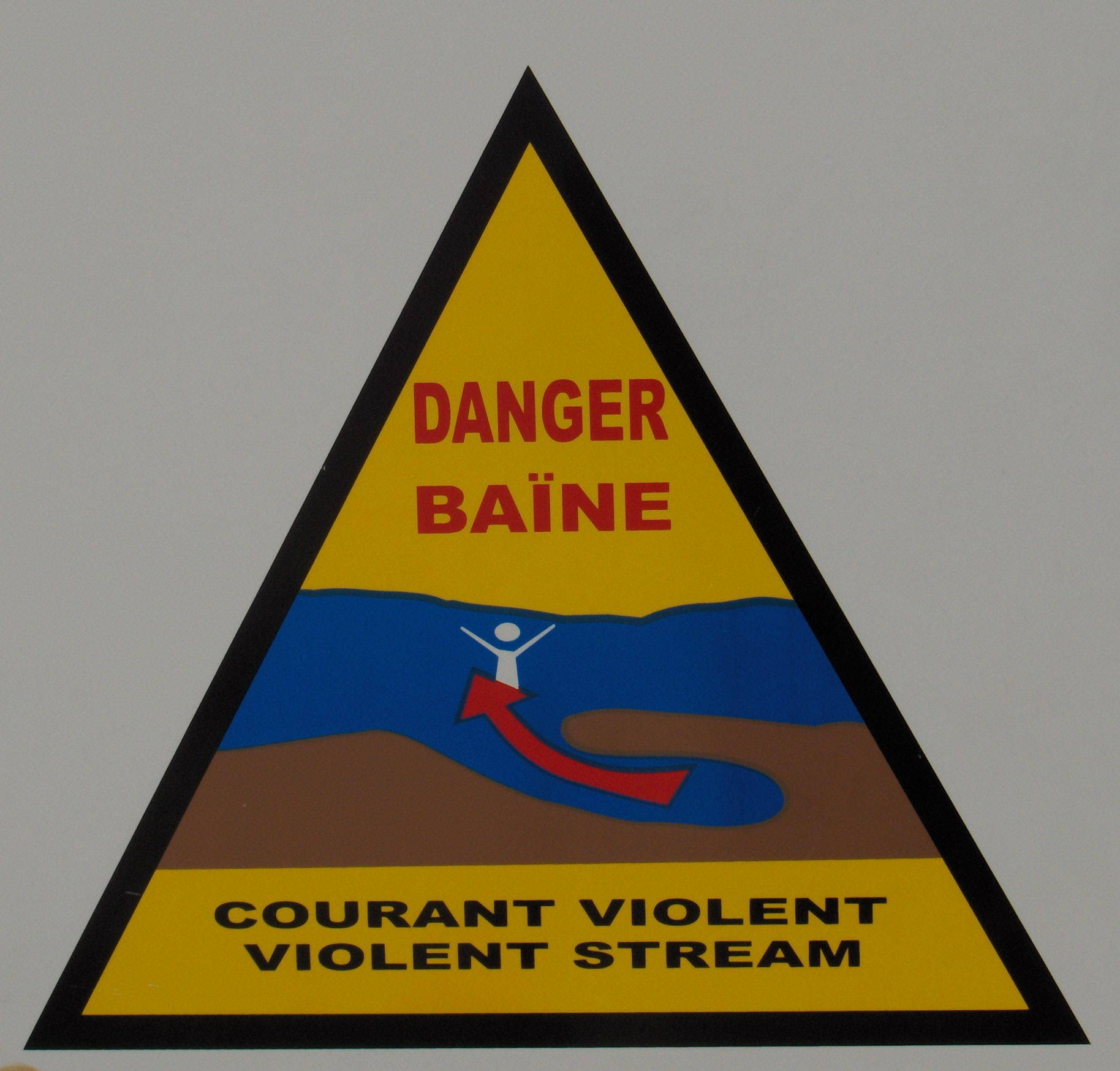
Baïnes: Warning sign at Mimizan

A baïne is a pool of water of a few dozen to several hundred metres in length, parallel to the beach and directly connected to the sea. Each one is spaced every 300 to 400 metres and formed under the influence of waves and the tide. The French term baïne is typical for the Aquitaine coast of France in the departments of Gironde, Charente-Maritime and Landes, but it can occur on beaches throughout the world.

When a wave hits the coast, it can pass over the sandbar that separates the baïne from the sea and enter it all along its length. When the wave subsequently recedes, the baïne water is pushed out through the single point where it was connected to the sea. At this point a rip current, a very strong offshore current, can occur. The current will vary depending on the height of the waves and the height of the tide. It is at its strongest and most dangerous during the final hours approaching low tide, and in the first hours afterwards. Swimmers caught in this current are advised not to resist but to let themselves be carried out to sea where the current is weaker, then to swim parallel to the beach before attempting to approach the shore.

== Development ==
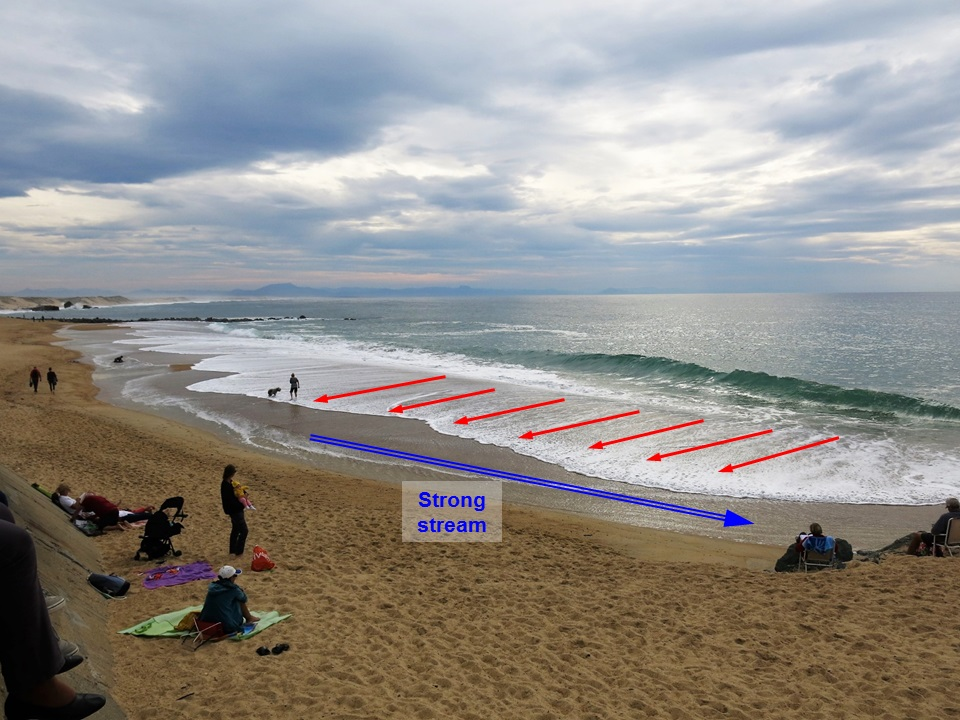
The waves feed with water (small red arrows). Water flows out in a strong lateral stream (blue arrow).

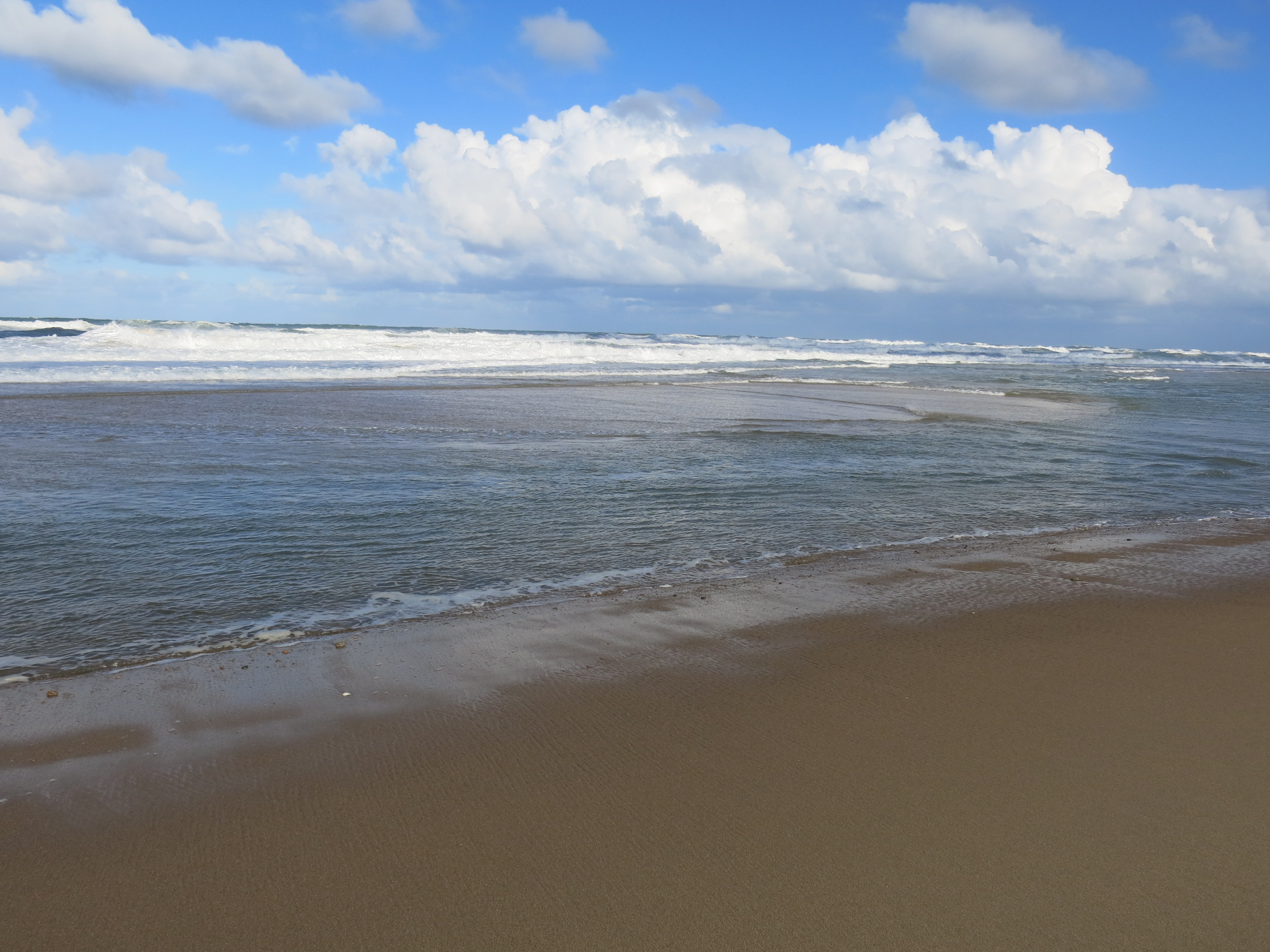
Beginning of a baïne

Baïnes appear where the phenomenon of tide is strong, the sand fine, the beach flat with a strong swell. The swell moves the sand along the shore, interfering with current perpendicular to the beach. These currents prevail seaward the sandy bottom and digging pits visible at low tide of up to 100 meters wide and 4-5 meters deep. Each baïne has its own morphology and generates various forms of currents.

== See also ==
- Rip tide
- Rip current
