= San Pedro Bay (Florida) =

Area of wetlands in Florida

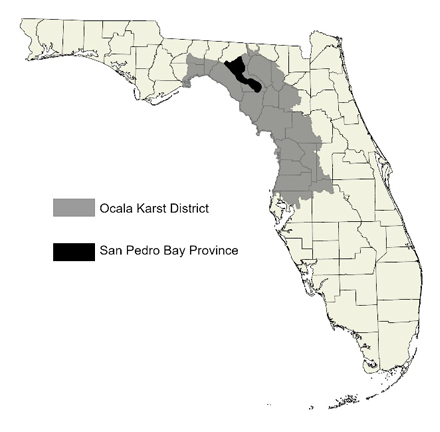
Location map of San Pedro Bay geomorphological province in Florida

San Pedro Bay is a wetland region and geomorphological province between the Suwannee and Econfina rivers in northern Florida. It includes parts of southern Madison County, northeastern Taylor County, central Lafayette County, and north-central Dixie County.

== Name ==
A Spanish mission named San Pedro de Potohiriba was established in the mid-17th century in the vicinity of southern Madison County. A town called San Pedro, on the Bellamy Road in southern Madison County, was designated as the county seat when the county was created in 1827.

== Geology ==
San Pedro Bay province is relatively flat, with a bedrock of Ocala and Suwannee limestones covered by a thin layer of San Pedro clay. The clay is relatively impermeable, preventing surface water from reaching the underlying limestone. As a result, there has been little development of a karst landscape in the province, and numerous wetlands are perched on the clay. The elevation of the province ranges from 55 to 115 feet (17 to 35 m) above sea level, with a median elevation of 85 feet (26 m). It slopes down gradually from north to south, westward from the middle towards the Gulf of Mexico, and eastwards from the middle towards the Suwannee River Valley. The Econofina and Fenholloway rivers have their headwaters in the northwestern part of the province, while the Steinhatchee River arises in the southeastern part of the province. There are few or no streams elsewhere in the province.

San Pedro Bay province is bordered on the north by the Madison Hills geomorphological province, along the Cody Scarp. To the east San Pedro Bay is bordered by the Branford Karst Plain province, to the southeast by the Chiefland Karst Plain province, and to the west and southwest by the Perry Karst Plain province, all of which are lower in elevantion, better drained, and have more small sinkholes then San Pedro Bay. Several streams that originate in San Pedro Bay near the Branford Karst Plain and Perry Karst Plain provinces, including the Fenholloway and Steinhatchee rivers, enter swallets shortly after leaving San Pedro Bay.

== Ecology ==
San Pedro Bay comprises a mix of basin swamps, baygalls, cypress domes, wet flatwoods, titi thickets, peat bogs, and pine plantations. Pine plantations cover about half of the area of the province. As of 2025, it is the largest privately-owned roadless area in Florida.

The 31,000 acres (13,000 ha) Mallory Swamp Wildlife Management Area, jointly managed by the Florida Fish and Wildlife Conservation Commission and the Suwannee River Water Management District, is located in San Predo Bay.
