= Steinhatchee Falls =

Coordinates: 29.74626°N 83.34228°W

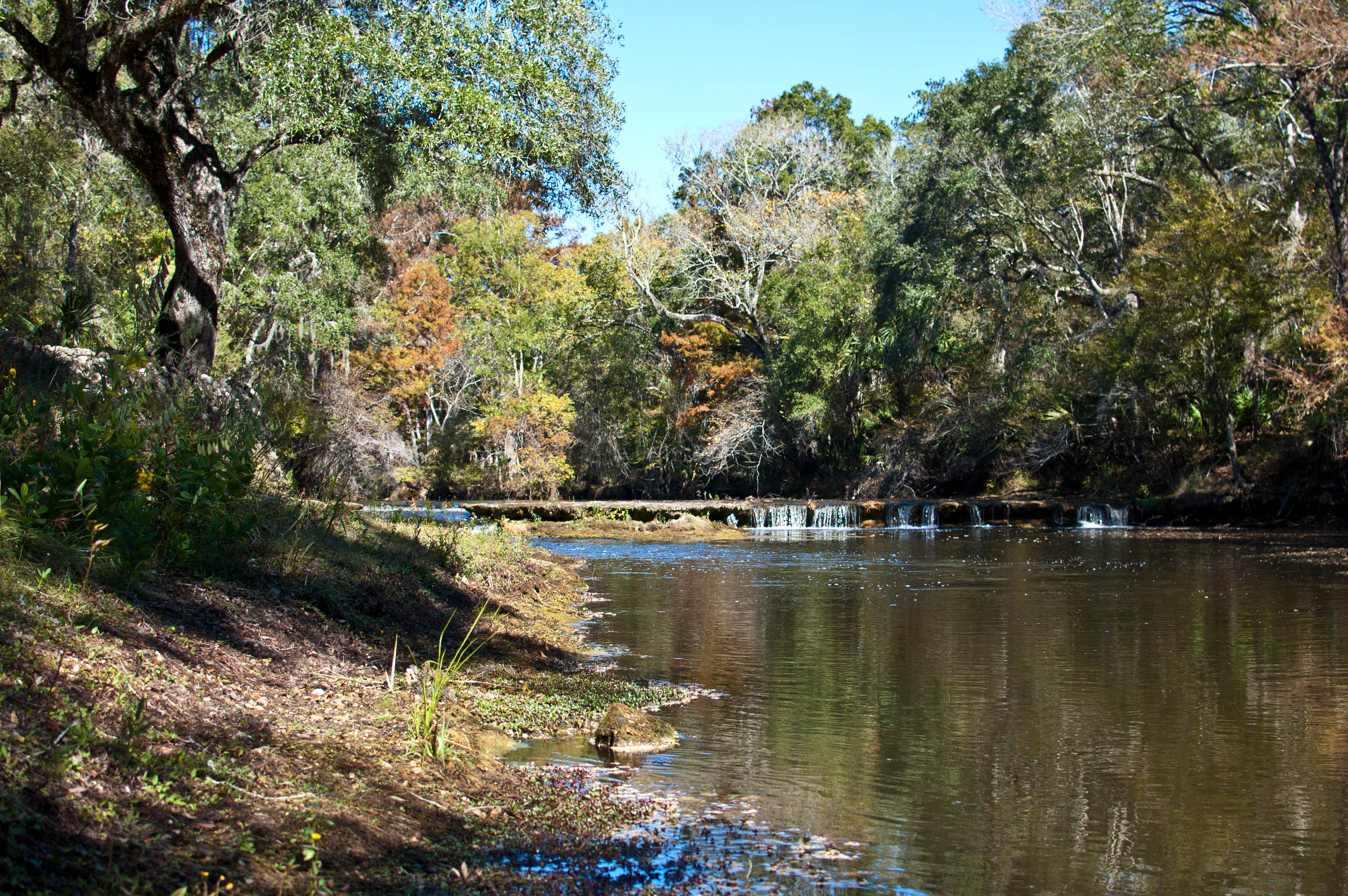
Steinhatchee Falls

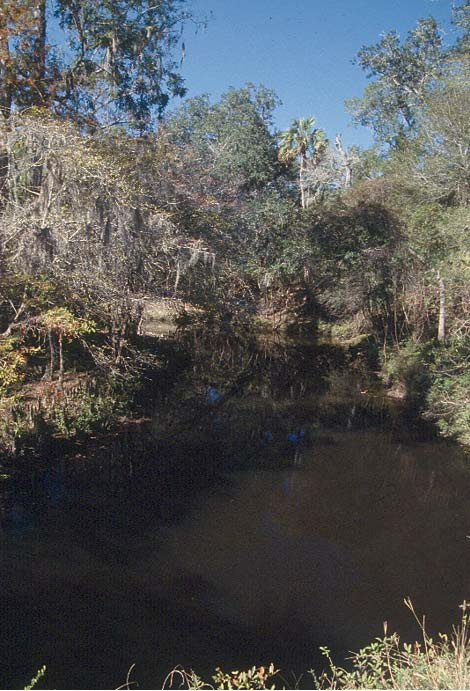
Steinhatchee Rise

Steinhatchee Falls and Steinhatchee Rise are tracts of protected lands in Florida named for aquatic features. Steinhatchee Falls includes 1,766 acres (715 ha), and Steinhatchee Rise covers 3,559 acres (1,440 ha). Steinhatchee Falls is in southeastern Taylor County, Florida. Steinhatchee Rise is in southwestern Dixie County, Florida.

The area around the falls is floodplain swamp, bottom land forest, pine plantation, and mixed hardwood forest. The area around Steinhatchee Rise contains also includes floodplain swamp, bottom land forest, pine plantation, and mixed hardwood forest as well as mesic woods and wet flat woods. Animal species in the area include gopher tortoise, wading birds, wild hog, swallow-tailed kite, Swainson's warbler, deer, turkey, and squirrel. A trailhead for the Steinhatchee Trail Tennille Trail is on Florida SR 51.

Steinhatchee Falls Park is a tourist attraction and viewpoint with water cascading over a small falls on the Steinhatchee River. The Steinhatchee Trail is a 3-mile (5 km) multi-use trail ending at Steinhatchee Falls. Coming off a limestone lip across the river, the height of Steinhatchee Falls ranges from four to five feet down to being almost unnoticeable when the river is high.

== See also ==
- Suwannee River Water Management District
- List of Florida state parks
- Florida state forests
