= Steinhatchee River =

River in Florida, United States of America

Coordinates: 29.6670°N 83.4114°W

The Steinhatchee River is a short river in the Big Bend region of Florida in the United States. The river rises in the Mallory Swamp just south of Mayo in Lafayette County and flows for 34.5 miles (55.5 km) out of Lafayette County, forming the boundary between Dixie County and Taylor County to the Gulf of Mexico. It has a drainage basin of 586 square miles (1,520 km^{2}). The river has also been known as the Hittenhatchee, Esteenhatchee and Isteenhatchee.

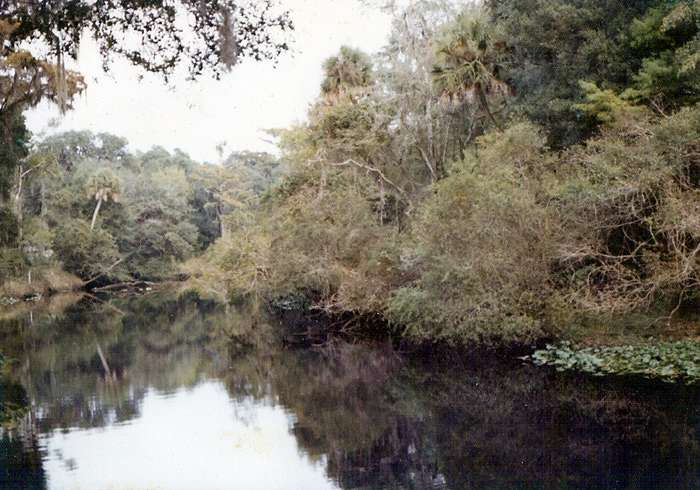
The Steinhatchee River 5 miles upriver from town is freshwater. Both of these shots were taken at the same location.

The headwaters of the river are in San Pedro Bay, an area of wetlands.

The only communities along the river are Steinhatchee and Jena near its mouth. The river is not developed, being used solely for recreation and as a port for landings of locally caught commercial fishes such as sheepshead, mullet, gag and red grouper, Spanish mackerel, white grunt, hogfish, stone crab, and blue crab. About 1 mile (1.6 km) of the river goes underground as a subterranean river near where U.S. Route 19 crosses the river. 8 miles (13 km) from the river's mouth is Steinhatchee Falls, where the river drops several feet.

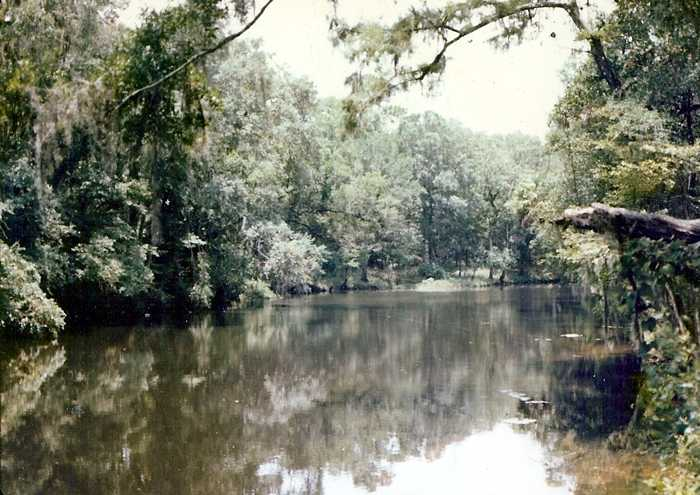
The Steinhatchee River is a pristine ecosystem

== See also ==
- Steinhatchee Rise, an area of protected land that includes the rise
- Steinhatchee Falls, an area of protected land that includes the falls
