= Falmouth Spring =

Natural spring in the state of Florida

Coordinates: 30°21′41″N 83°08′07″W

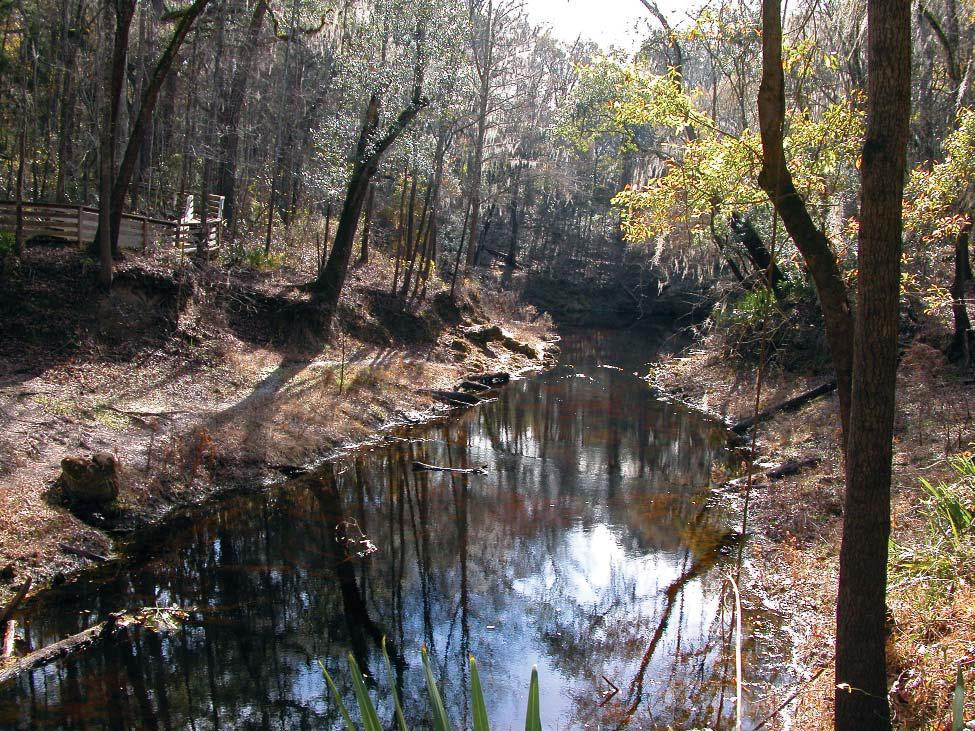
Falmouth Spring

Falmouth Spring is a natural spring on 276 acres (112 hectares) of protected lands in Falmouth, Florida. The site is open to the public for swimming and other activities, and is managed by the Suwannee River Water Management District.

== See also ==
- List of Florida state parks
- Florida state forests
- Southwest Florida Water Management District
