= Fenholloway River =

River in Florida, United States

Coordinates: 29°58′38″N 83°47′07″W

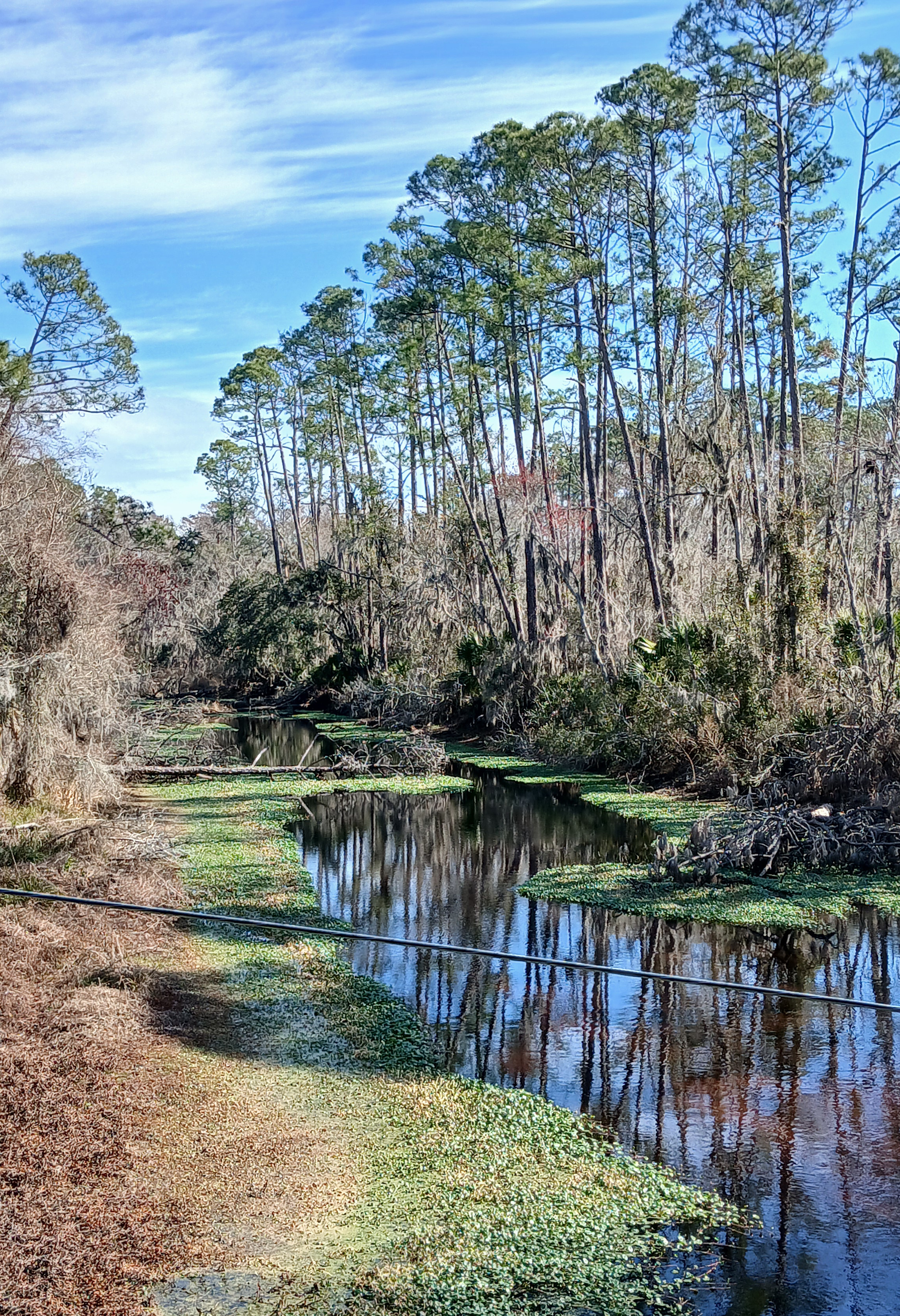
From the bridge southeast of Perry, looking northeast up a straightened section of the river

The Fenholloway River is a stream in Taylor County, Florida.

Located along the river and near the town of Perry, Florida is the Foley Cellulose mill, formerly known as the Buckeye Mill, which was purchased by Georgia-Pacific in 2013. Georgia-Pacific invested over $300 million in mill improvements to complete the Fenholloway Water Quality Project in September 2020.

The headwaters of the river are in San Pedro Bay, an area of wetlands.

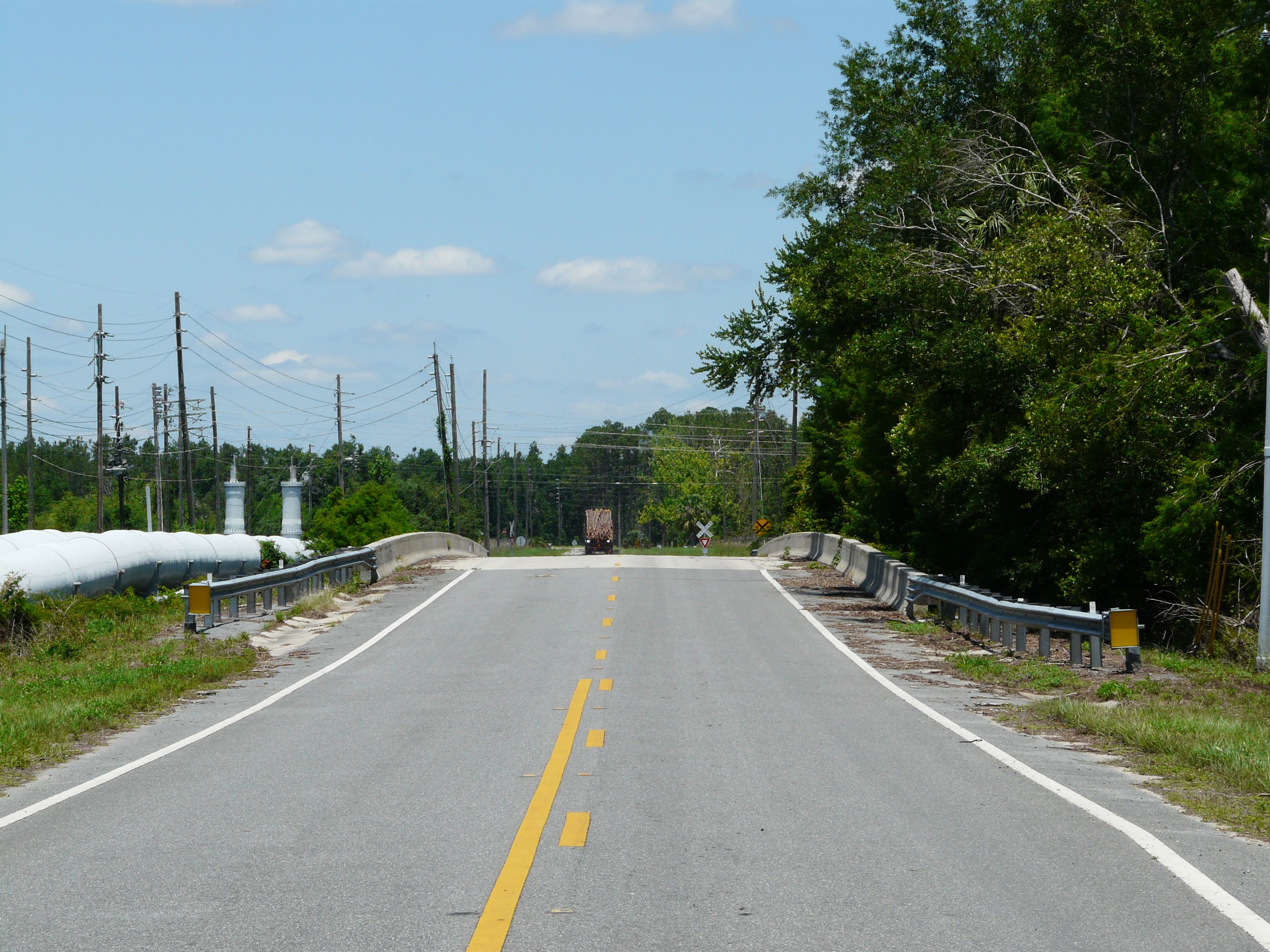
CR-356C crosses the Fenholloway River

The river flow and pattern were restored to what it was prior to the start of Procter & Gamble pulp mill operations in 1954. The Foley Cellulose Mill no longer discharges treated effluent directly into the Fenholloway River.
