= Rip tide =

Current caused by the tide pulling water through an inlet

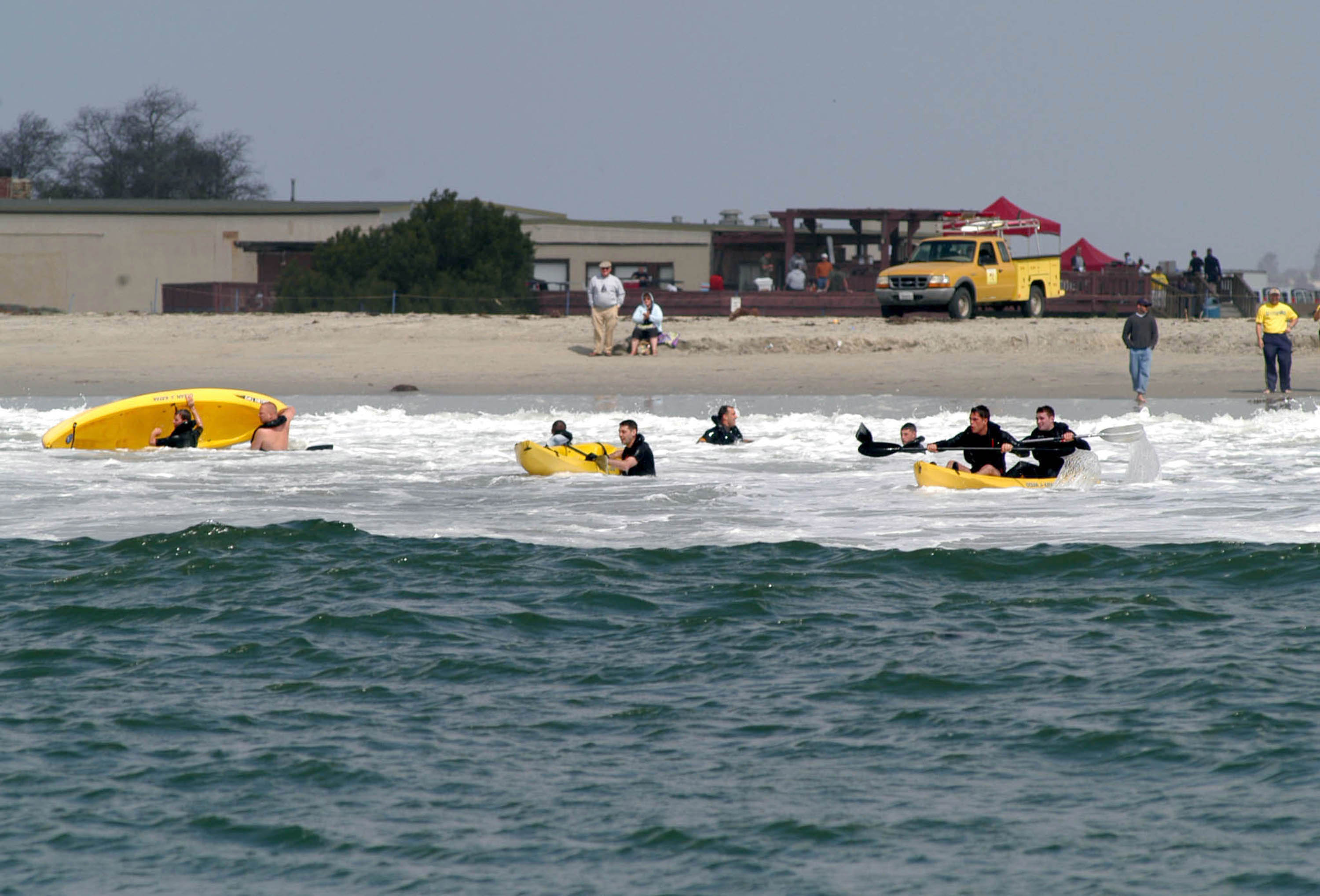

A rip tide, or riptide, is a strong offshore current that is caused by the tide pulling water through an inlet along a barrier beach, at a lagoon or inland marina where tide water flows steadily out to sea during ebb tide. It is a strong tidal flow of water within estuaries and other enclosed tidal areas. The riptides become the strongest where the flow is constricted. When there is a falling or ebbing tide, the outflow water is strongly flowing through an inlet toward the sea, especially once stabilised by jetties.

== Dynamics ==
During these falling and ebbing tides, a riptide can carry a person far offshore. For example, the ebbing tide at Shinnecock Inlet in Southampton, New York, extends more than 300 metres (980 ft) offshore. Because of this, riptides are typically more powerful than rip currents.

During slack tide, the water is motionless for a short period of time until the flooding or rising tide starts pushing the sea water landward through the inlet. Riptides also occur at constricted areas in bays and lagoons where there are no waves near an inlet.

These strong, reversing currents can also be termed ebb jets, flood jet, or tidal jets by coastal engineers because they carry large quantities of sand outward that form sandbars far out in the ocean or into the bay outside the inlet channel. The term "ebb jet" would be used for a tidal current leaving an enclosed tidal area, and "flood jet" for the equivalent tidal current entering it.

== Rip tide and rip currents ==
The term rip tide is often incorrectly used to refer to rip currents, which are not tidal flows. A rip current is a strong, narrow jet of water that moves away from the beach and into the ocean as a result of local wave motion. Rip currents can flow quickly, are unpredictable, and come about from what happens to waves as they interact with the shape of the sea bed. In contrast, a rip tide is caused by tidal movements, as opposed to wave action, and is a predictable rise and fall of the water level.

The United States National Oceanic and Atmospheric Administration comments:

Rip currents are not rip tides. A specific type of current associated with tides may include both the ebb and flood tidal currents that are caused by egress and ingress of the tide through inlets and the mouths of estuaries, embayments, and harbors. These currents may cause drowning deaths, but these tidal currents or tidal jets are separate and distinct phenomena from rip currents. Recommended terms for these phenomena include ebb jet, flood jet, or tidal jet.

== See also ==
- Rip current
- Baïne
- Tidal bore
