= Fall Creek Falls (Douglas County, Oregon) =

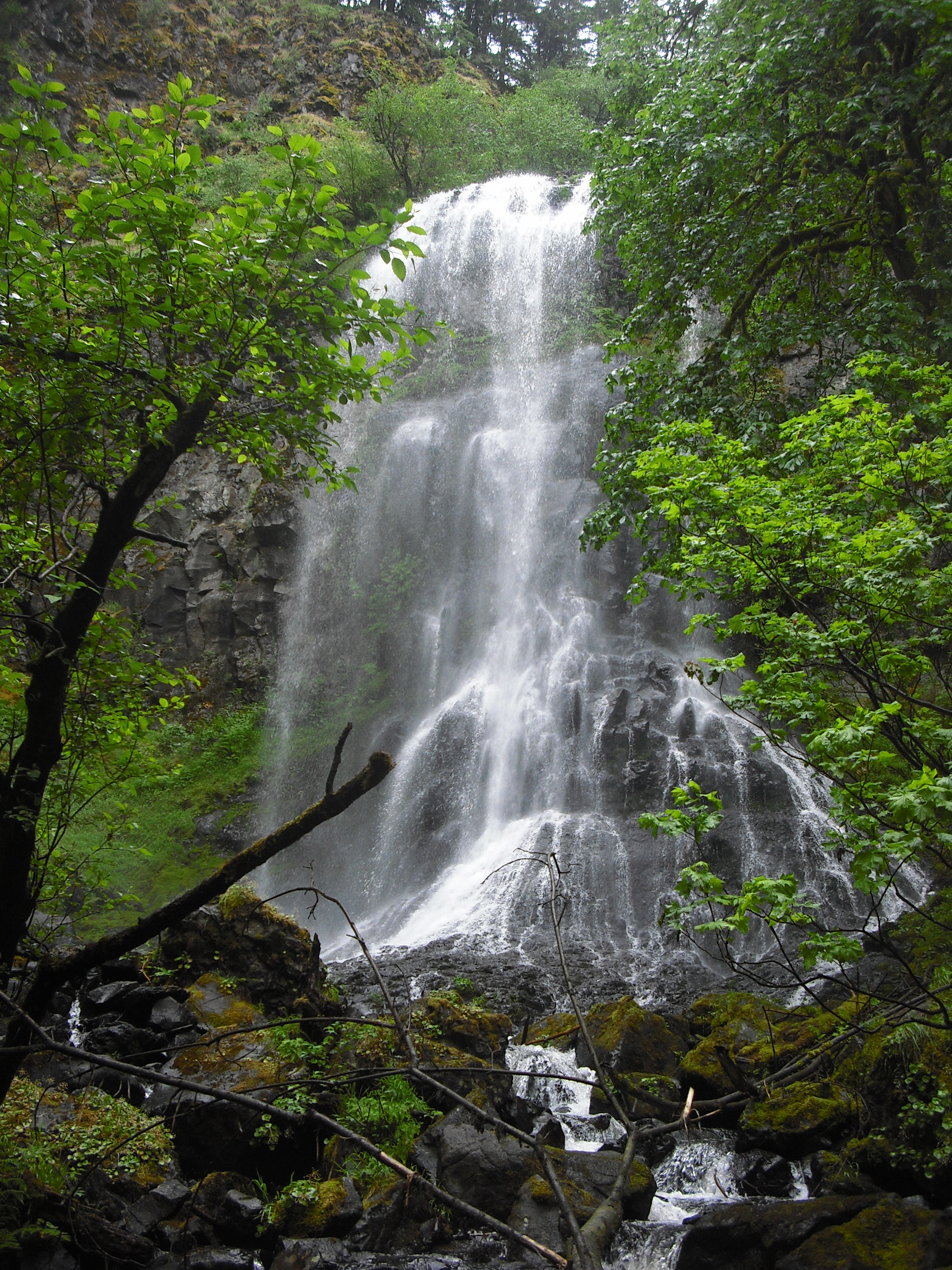
- Fall Creek Falls in the summer
- Interactive map of Fall Creek Falls
- Location: North Umpqua River
- Coordinates: 43.31889°N 122.83972°W
- Type: Plunge
- Elevation: 1,361 ft (415 m)
- Total height: 120 ft (37 m)

Fall Creek Falls, is a three to four drop waterfall located on the North Umpqua River at the west skirt of the Umpqua National Forest, in Douglas County, in the U.S. state of Oregon. It is located in a privileged natural area where the river creates several waterfalls: Susan Creek Falls, Emile Falls, and Grotto Falls are two to five miles away.

== Access ==
Fall Creek Falls is approximately 16 mi (26 km) from the town of Glide, Oregon. Hiking to Fall Creek Falls starts at a trailhead that runs south along a cascading creek. The trailhead is at the left side of Oregon Route 138 as it goes through Umpqua National Forest, and is approximately one mile of gravel surface into the mountain. The trail passes through a narrow crevice in a large boulder, then climbs alongside the creek before approaching the falls. The trails and surrounding forests were severely damaged during the 2020 Archie Creek Fire.

== See also ==
- List of waterfalls in Oregon
