= Steinhatchee, Florida =

- Census-designated place
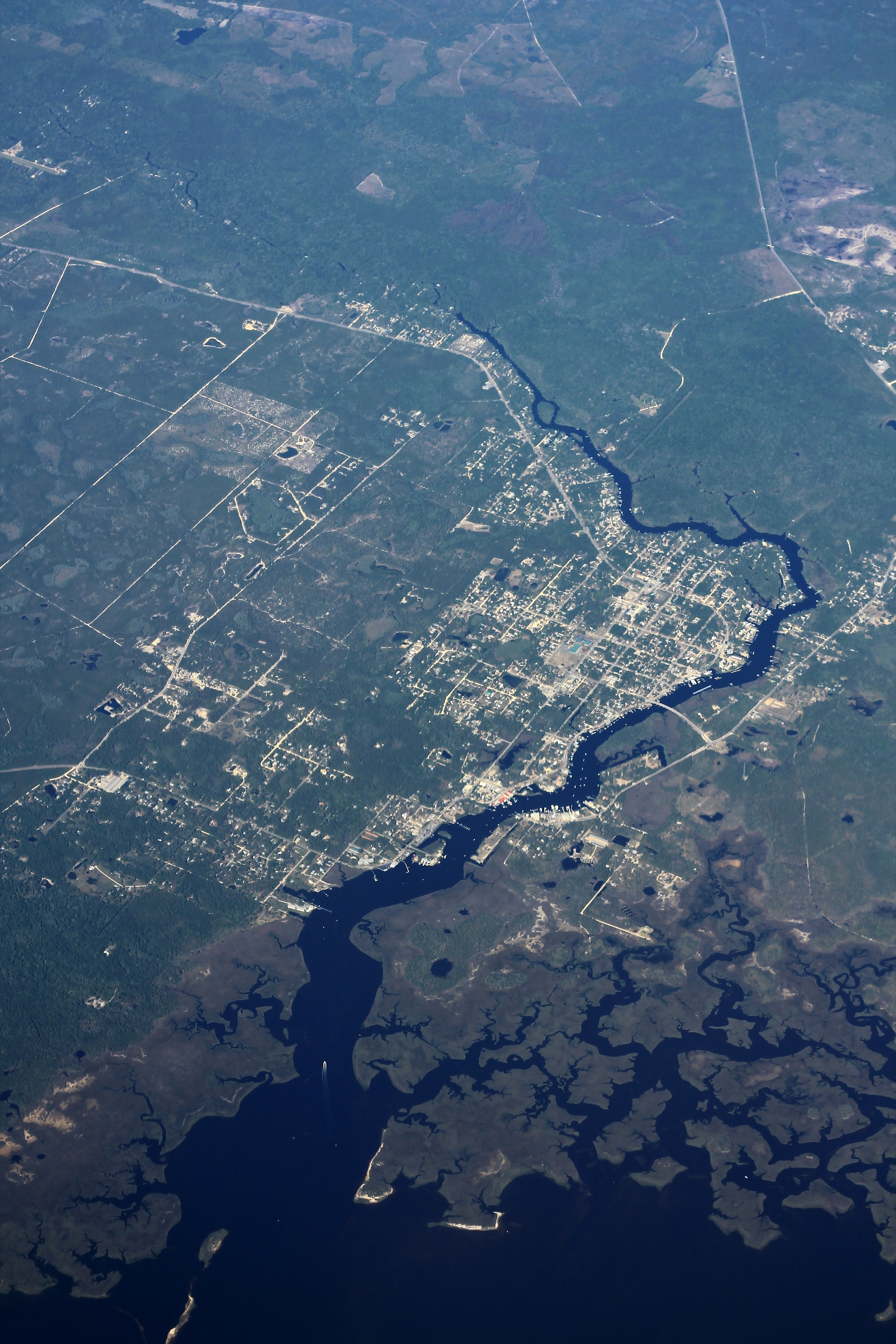
- Aerial photo of Steinhatchee

- Location within Florida Location within the United States
- Coordinates: 29°40′43″N 83°22′32″W
- Country: United States
- State: Florida
- County: Taylor

Area
  - Total: 3.306 sq mi (8.56 km^{2})
  - Land: 3.198 sq mi (8.28 km^{2})
  - Water: 0.108 sq mi (0.28 km^{2})
- Elevation: 10 ft (3.0 m)

Population (2020)
  - Total: 1,049
- ZIP code: 32359
- Area code: 352
- GNIS feature ID: 2628534

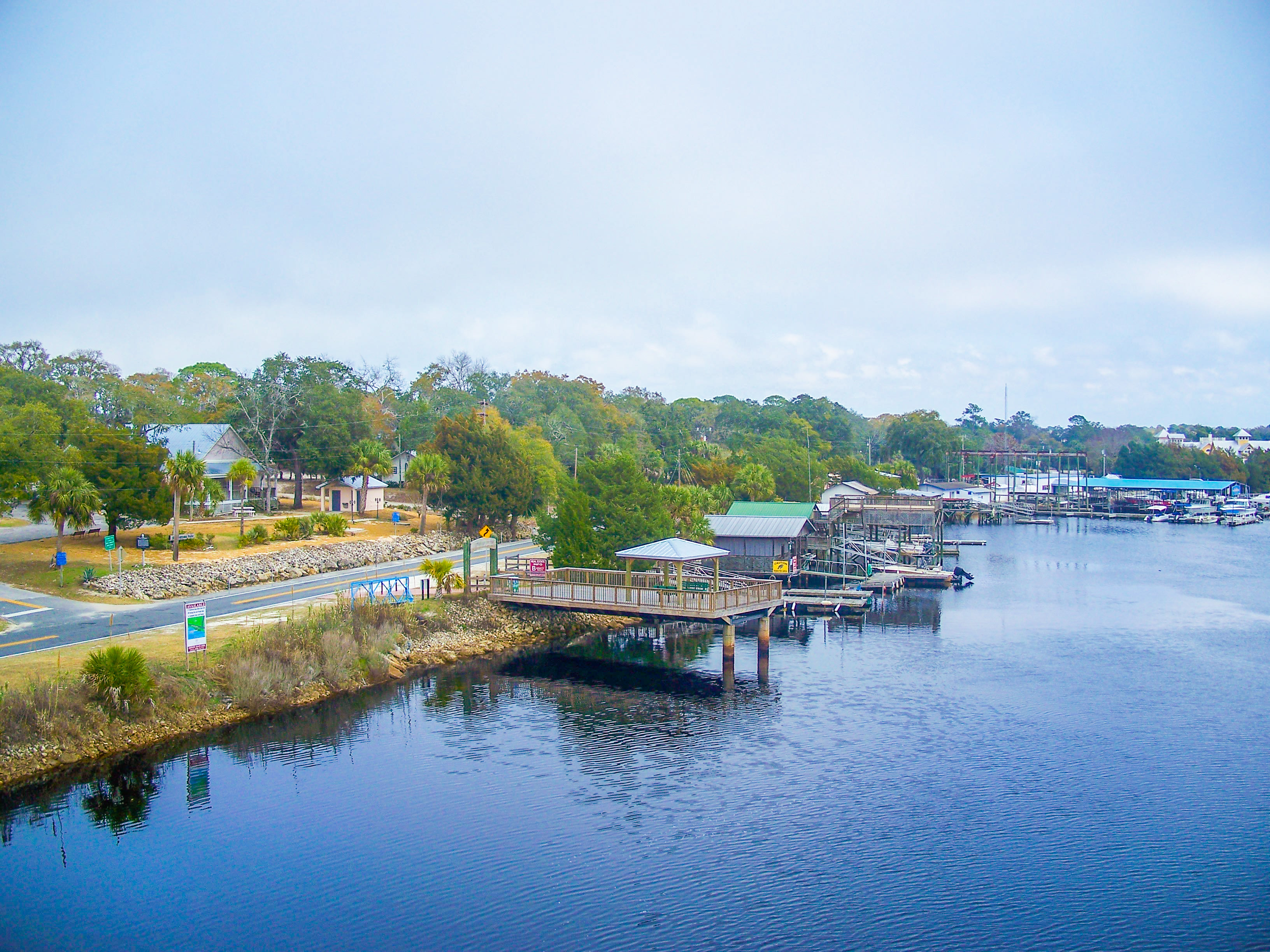
Steinhatchee as seen from the 10th Street Bridge facing east, February 2011

Steinhatchee (/ˈstiːnhætʃi/ STEEN-hatch-ee) is a Gulf coastal community in the southern part of Taylor County, Florida, United States. Steinhatchee is 38 miles (61 km) south of the county seat of Perry. Just across the Steinhatchee River is Jena, which is in Dixie County. Steinhatchee is 19.27 miles north of the town of Cross City. As of the 2020 census, Steinhatchee had a population of 1,049. Its approximate elevation is 7 feet above sea level.

== History ==
Since the early 19th century, the village of Steinhatchee played an integral part in the foresting industry, particularly cedar used for making pencils, as well as fishing, crabbing and scalloping. The Steinhatchee River also flows by the community and into the Gulf of Mexico.

In August 2023, Hurricane Idalia impacted the community, with a storm surge of 6 feet and 80+ mph winds.

In August 2024, Hurricane Debby made landfall near Steinhatchee as a Category 1 hurricane, with winds up to 80 mph.

In September 2024, Steinhatchee was severely impacted by Hurricane Helene. The community experienced a storm surge that exceeded 20 feet.

== Demographics ==
Steinhatchee first appeared as a census designated place in the 2010 U.S. census.

=== 2020 census ===
As of the 2020 census, Steinhatchee had a population of 1,049. The median age was 62.4 years. 9.0% of residents were under the age of 18 and 44.2% of residents were 65 years of age or older. For every 100 females there were 90.4 males, and for every 100 females age 18 and over there were 89.5 males age 18 and over.

0.0% of residents lived in urban areas, while 100.0% lived in rural areas.

There were 537 households in Steinhatchee, of which 12.3% had children under the age of 18 living in them. Of all households, 46.9% were married-couple households, 25.5% were households with a male householder and no spouse or partner present, and 22.2% were households with a female householder and no spouse or partner present. About 36.7% of all households were made up of individuals and 22.5% had someone living alone who was 65 years of age or older.

There were 1,567 housing units, of which 65.7% were vacant. The homeowner vacancy rate was 4.1% and the rental vacancy rate was 33.3%. There were 214 families residing in Steinhatchee.

Note: the US Census treats Hispanic/Latino as an ethnic category. This table excludes Latinos from the racial categories and assigns them to a separate category. Hispanics/Latinos can be of any race.

Steinhatchee racial composition (NH = Non-Hispanic)
Race	Number	Percentage
White (NH)	963	91.8%
Black or African American (NH)	5	0.48%
Native American or Alaska Native (NH)	2	0.19%
Asian (NH)	6	0.57%
Some Other Race (NH)	3	0.29%
Mixed/Multi-Racial (NH)	44	4.19%
Hispanic or Latino	26	2.48%
Total	1,049	

=== 2010 census ===
As of the 2010 census, there were 1,047 people. The population density was 327.4 people per square mile. There were 1,555 housing units. The racial makeup of the village was 98.7% White, 0.0% African American, 0.3% Native American, 0.3% Asian, and 0.2% from two or more races. Hispanic or Latino of any race were 1.9% of the population.

=== Ancestry ===
As of 2010 the largest self-reported ancestry groups in Steinhatchee, Florida, are:

Largest ancestries (2010)	Percent
English	29.8%
German	16.5%
Irish	15.5%
Scots-Irish	10.5%
Dutch	3.4%
Italian	3.3%
French (except Basque)	2.6%
