= Falling Creek Falls =

Waterfall in Columbia County, Florida

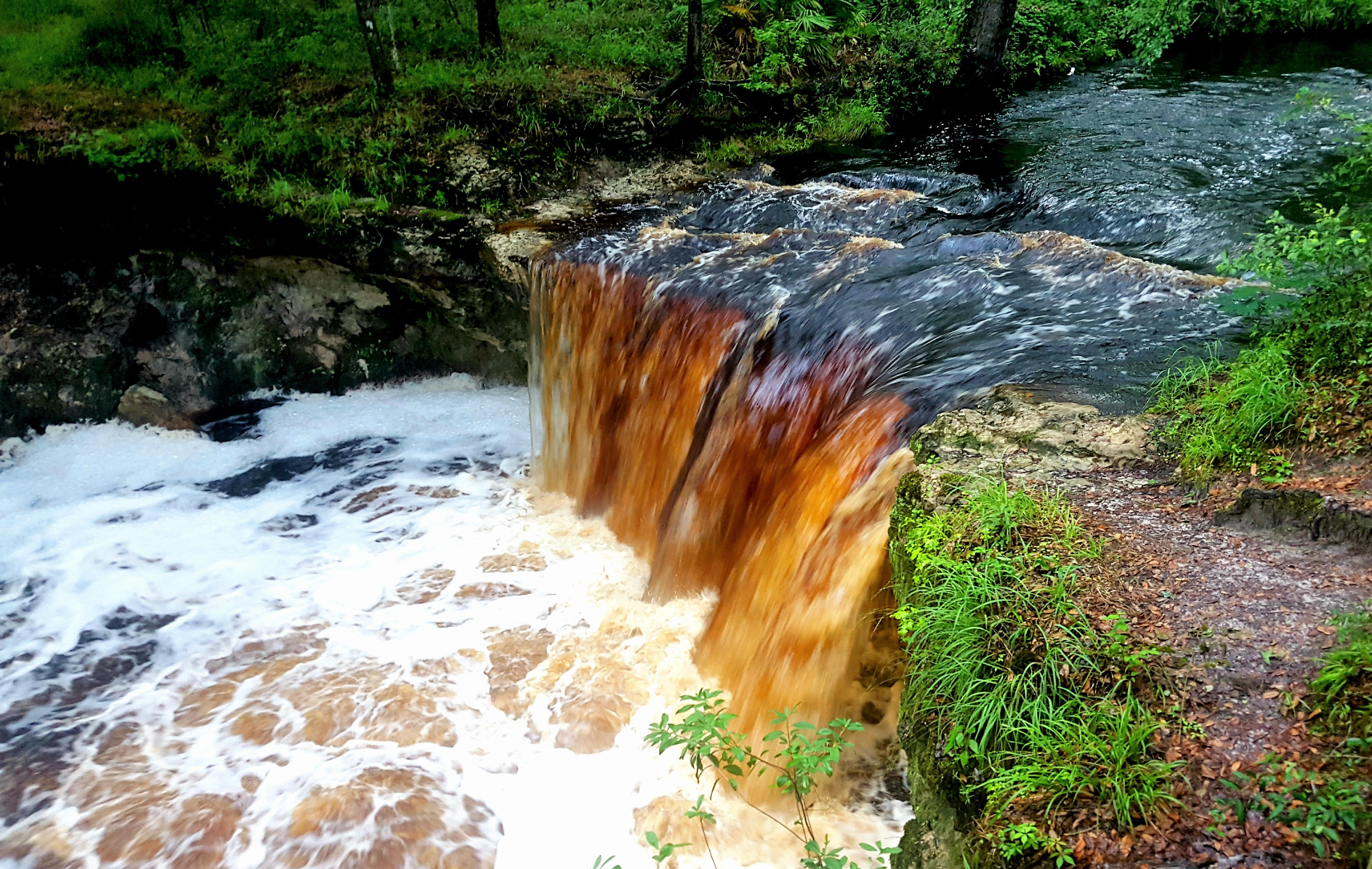
- Falling Creek Falls
- Interactive map of Falling Creek Falls
- Location: Columbia County, Florida, Florida, United States
- Coordinates: 30°15′16.87″N 82°40′0.872″W

Falling Creek Falls is a 10-foot (3 m) waterfall on 204 acres (83 ha) jointly managed by the Suwannee River Water Management District and Columbia County, Florida. Located north of Lake City, Florida, boardwalk access to the waterfall starts at a parking lot located on the east-side of County Road 131 just north of the 441/I-10 interchange. The park's address and boardwalk trailhead is at 953 Northwest Falling Creek Road, Lake City, FL 32055. Falling Creek Falls was opened to the public in October 2001 as a joint project between the Suwannee River Water Management District and Columbia County after the property was purchased from the Parker & Hogan families "to protect and preserve the Falls for present and future generations".

== See also ==
- List of Florida state parks
- List of Florida state forests
- Southwest Florida Water Management District
