= Mallory Swamp =

Swamp in Big Bend Region of Florida

Coordinates: 29.878°N 83.055°W

Mallory Swamp is a large basin or bog swamp in southeastern Lafayette County and northeast Dixie County in the Big Bend Region of Florida. (Note: Basin swamps are found in large depressions on sandy soil with limited outflow in northern Florida and southern Georgia. They accumulate about 1 inch (25 mm) of peat every 50 years, with peat deposits up to 15 feet (4.6 m) deep. The Okefenokee Swamp, at about 600 square miles (1,600 km^{2}), is the largest basin swamp in the Florida-Georgia area.) Mallory Swamp includes cypress swamps, titi thickets, peat bogs, and upland habitats. It is part of the Mallory Swamp-San Pedro Bay-California Swamp system in Dixie, Lafayette, and Taylor counties. That system is the largest basin swamp in Florida, covering more than 500 square miles (1,300 km^{2}). Mallory Swamp is the largest wetland in the San Pedro Bay geomorphological province. The California Swamp is in Dixie County to the south of Mallory Swamp, close to the Gulf Coast. The Lower Suwannee National Wildlife Refuge includes part of the California Swamp.

In the 1950s through the 1970s land owners attempted to convert the Mallory Swamp-San Pedro Bay swamps to pine plantations. One study estimated that more than 9,000 acres (3,600 ha) of wetlands in Mallory Swamp were being converted to pine platantions per year. Hundreds of miles of drainage ditches were dug throughout the area. The flood retention capacity of the swamp was reduced by the drainage. Attempts to restore the hydrology of the swamp began in the 1990s. In 1997, the Sam Shine Foundation acquired 30,501 acres (12,343 ha) of the Mallory Swamp that had been converted to pine plantation and started a restoration project. A separate tract of 800 acres (320 ha) was also acquired. The land was later sold to the State of Florida and the larger parcel was placed under the Suwannee River Water Management District and is operated by the Florida Fish and Wildlife Conservation Commission as the Mallory Swamp Wildlife Management Area. The 800-acre (320 ha) tract became the core of the Lafayette Forest Wildlife and Environmental Area.

The Mallory Swamp Wildlife Management Area includes about 31,000 acres (13,000 ha) in southeastern Lafayette County, southwest of Branford, Florida. The area is open seasonally for hunting and year-round for fishing, camping, hiking, biking, horseback riding, and wildlife viewing. An ATV trail is open April to mid-September. The Lafayette Forest Wildlife and Environmental Area operated by the Florida Fish and Wildlife Conservation Commission has more than 2,000 acres of swamps, marshes, flatwoods, and hardwood hammocks that are being restored for wildlife habitat and recreation. The Lafayette Forest is a Florida Forever project to protect a 13,217-acre (5,349 ha) tract on the east side of the Mallory Swamp Wildlife Management Area. As of 2026, the state has acquired 2,960 acres (1,200 ha) of the tract. The goal of the project is to preserve wetlands and restore the natural hydrology of the tract.

The Mallory Swamp fire in May 2001 burned 57,200 acres (23,100 ha), including all of the wildlife management area. It was started by a lightning strike on May 12 and burned for the rest of the month before being contained. The burn helped clear the wildlife management area for a project to restore natural water levels and native vegetation.

The Suwannee River Water Management District, the Florida Department of Environmental Protection, and Dixie County initiated a $2,000,000 project to raise water levels in Mallory Swamp in 2013. The project closed off ditches where they drained out of the swamp and injected the water flowing out of the swamp into wells to restore levels in the Floridan aquifer.

== Sources ==
- Larson, Ron (1995). Swamp Song: A Natural History of Florida's Swamps. Gainesville, Florida: University Press of Florida. ISBN 978-0-8130-1355-8.
- Williams, Christopher P.; Scott, Thomas M.; Upchurch, Sam B. (2022). Florida Geomorphology Atlas (PDF). Special Publication 59 (Report). Tallahassee, Florida: Florida Geological Survey. p. 2.
