= Rip current statement =

Warning statement issued in the United States by the National Weather Service

A rip current statement is a warning statement issued by the National Weather Service of the United States when there is a high threat of rip currents due to weather and ocean conditions.

The statement usually contains some detail about when and roughly where the rip currents are most likely to be forming. It also states for how long the conditions are likely to continue. It warns swimmers and anyone else who might go into the water, where more specifically rip currents are likely to form on a beach. It also may explain what to do to avoid being caught in a rip, and also what not to do if one is caught in a rip.

== Example ==
The following is an example of a Rip Current statement issued in Houston or Galveston, TX in October 2021.

Coastal Hazard Message
National Weather Service Houston/Galveston TX
1014 AM CDT Thu Oct 14 2021

TXZ436>439-150000-
/O.CON.KHGX.BH.S.0010.000000T0000Z-211015T0000Z/
Matagorda Islands-Brazoria Islands-Galveston Island-
Bolivar Peninsula-
1014 AM CDT Thu Oct 14 2021

...BEACH HAZARDS STATEMENT REMAINS IN EFFECT THROUGH THIS
EVENING...

* WHAT...Strong rip currents and elevated water levels.

* WHERE...Brazoria Islands, Matagorda Islands, Bolivar Peninsula
  and Galveston Island.

* WHEN...Through this evening.

* IMPACTS...Rip currents can sweep even the best swimmers away
  from shore into deeper water. Elevated water levels could
  produce minor coastal flooding at times of high tide.

PRECAUTIONARY/PREPAREDNESS ACTIONS...

Remain out of the water to avoid hazardous swimming conditions.

&&

$$

Another noticeable example of a statement is in the 2019 Memorial Day weekend near Miami, Florida.

...HIGH RIP CURRENT RISK REMAINS IN EFFECT THROUGH MONDAY
EVENING...

* TIMING...Through Memorial Day.

* IMPACTS...Life threatening rip currents will pose a hazard to
swimmers. Heed the advice of lifeguards. Swimming is not
recommended.

== See also ==
- Severe weather terminology (United States)
