= Suwannee River Water Management District =

Responsible for managing groundwater and surface water

SRWMD logo

The Suwannee River Water Management District (SRWMD) is responsible for managing groundwater and surface water resources in a 15-county region in north-central Florida, United States. It is the smallest of five Florida water management districts. Its district headquarters are in Live Oak, Florida.

== History ==
The five water management districts were established in 1972 by Chapter 373, Florida Statutes, and were empowered by the electorate in 1976 to assess ad valorem taxes to fund the management of the state’s water resources, and related land resources, to benefit the citizens and the environment. Each water management district is controlled by a Governing Board composed of citizens appointed by the Governor and approved by the Florida Senate. The Florida Department of Environmental Protection has oversight responsibility for the five water management districts.

== Function ==
SRWMD’s hydrological activities include regulating the consumptive use of water, regulating the construction and maintenance of stormwater management systems that serve developed properties in order to protect water quality and prevent flooding, regulating the construction of water wells and the licensure of water well contractors, conducting water supply planning, conducting research on water resource issues, buying and managing environmentally sensitive land, and the operation of flood control structures.

== Scope ==
The Florida counties which are entirely within the SRWMD are: Columbia, Dixie, Gilchrist, Hamilton, Lafayette, Madison, Suwannee, Taylor, and Union. Partial counties include: Alachua, Baker, Bradford, Jefferson, Levy and Putnam.

The major river under the district's control is the Suwannee. The major tributaries are the: Santa Fe, Alapaha and Ichetucknee. Other rivers include the Withlacoochee, Fenholloway, Aucilla, Steinhatchee, Econfina, Waccasassa and Wacissa.

== Recreation opportunities ==
Suwannee River Water Management District properties offering recreational opportunities include:

- Falling Creek Falls, Florida, sightseeing at a 10-foot (3.0 m) waterfall
- Big Shoals, 28 miles (45 km) of trails include the Woodpecker multi-use trail and a paddle craft boat launch
- White Springs (Florida)
- Little Shoals (Florida)
- Gar Pond
- Stephen Foster (Florida)
- Mattair Springs
- Camp Branch (Florida)
- Suwannee Springs
- Holton Creek
- Falmouth Springs
- Ellaville (Florida)
- Anderson Springs (Florida)
- Black tract
- North Mill Creek
- South Mill Creek
- Owens Spring
- Jennings Bluff (Florida)
- Devil's Hammock
- Atsena Otie
- Cabbage Creek
- Cabbage Grove
- Goose Pasture
- Mallory Swamp
- Steinhatchee Springs
- R.O. Ranch
- Steinhatchee Falls

== See also ==
- Northwest Florida Water Management District
- St. Johns River Water Management District
- South Florida Water Management District
- Southwest Florida Water Management District
