= Safety Harbor culture =

Native American archaeological culture

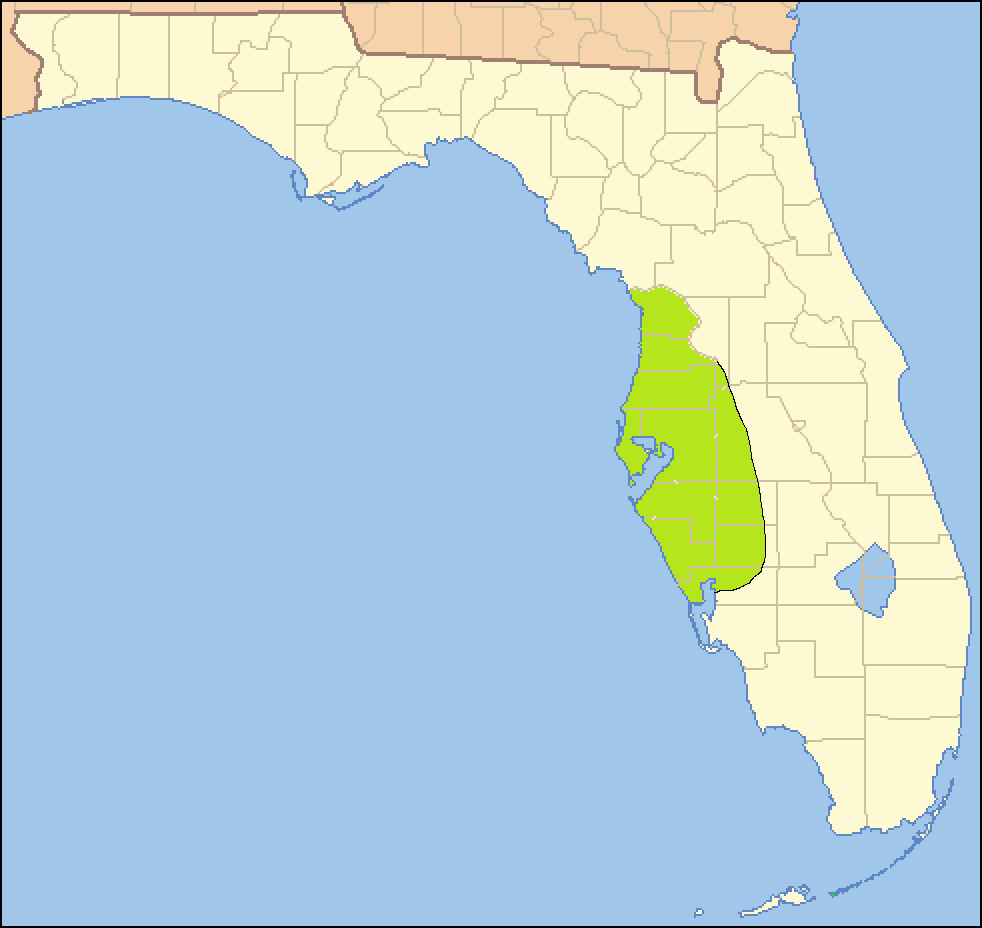
Map of the approximate area of the Safety Harbor archaeological culture

The Safety Harbor culture was an archaeological culture practiced by Native Americans living on the central Gulf coast of the Florida peninsula, from about 900 CE until after 1700. The Safety Harbor culture is defined by the presence of Safety Harbor ceramics in burial mounds. The culture is named after the Safety Harbor site, located close to the center of the culture area. The Safety Harbor site is the probable location of the chief town of the Tocobaga, the best known of the groups practicing the Safety Harbor culture.

The Safety Harbor people were organized into chiefdoms and lived primarily in villages along the shoreline of Tampa Bay and the adjacent Gulf of Mexico coast. The chiefdoms may have consisted of about 15 mi (24 km) of shoreline, and extended about 20 mi (32 km) inland. Each chiefdom had a principal town or "capital" with a temple mound and central plaza. Fifteen such towns have been identified along the Florida Gulf coast from southern Pasco County to northern Sarasota County, an area that includes all of the Tampa Bay area. Only one principal town has been found inland.

Descriptions of the villages by Spanish visitors mostly agree with archaeological reconstructions. Capitals had a central rectangular plaza. A truncated pyramidal mound up to 20 ft (6.1 m) high and up to 130 ft (40 m) long on each side at the base stood on one side of the plaza. One or more buildings stood on top of the mound, and a ramp ran from the top of the mound to the plaza. A burial mound would be located off to the side. A shell mound, or midden, ran along the shore, and other middens were sometimes located on other sides of the plaza. The plaza itself was kept clear of debris. The more important residents of the town had their houses around the plaza, while the lower class lived in huts further from the plaza. The Spanish reported that the chief and his family resided on the main mound, and that a "temple" (probably a charnel house) stood on the opposite side of the plaza. Archaeological excavations suggest that the charnel houses were on the mounds. Village sites without mounds, and isolated burial mounds, are also known.

== Geography and time span ==
The Safety Harbor culture area extended along the central Gulf coast of Florida. Bullen described it as running from Tarpon Springs to Sarasota, with some evidence that it reached the Aucilla River to the north and Charlotte Harbor to the south. Mitchem limited the northern extent of the culture area to the Withlacoochee River, but included the coast south into Collier County, and east into eastern Polk County. Milanich defines the culture area as the coast from the Withlacoochee River to Charlotte Harbor, placing the area from Charlotte Harbor to Collier County in the Caloosahatchee culture. The heart of the culture area was around Tampa Bay, what Mitchem and Milanich call "Circum-Tampa Bay". This area included all of what is now Hillsborough and Pinellas counties, southern Pasco County, and northern Manatee County. To the north. the area between the Withlacoochee River and the Gulf coast, including Citrus County, Hernando County and northern Pasco County, formed the "Northern Safety Harbor" area. South of Tampa Bay southern Manatee County, Sarasota County and northern Charlotte County comprised the "Manasota Safety Harbor" (Mitchem) or "South-Central Safety Harbor" (Milanich) area (Manasota is also the name given to the Weedon Island-related culture, which preceded the Safety Harbor culture in most of its area). Mitchem later agreed that "South-Central Safety Harbor" was preferable to avoid confusion. DeSoto County, Hardee County and most of Polk County were part of the "Inland Safety Harbor" area. Mitchem called his regional variant south of Charlotte Harbor (southern Charlotte County, Lee County and western Collier County) "South Florida".

Safety Harbor ceramics are found in burial mounds in the Caloosahatchee culture area (Mitchem's South Florida Safety Harbor). Milanich ascribes the presence of such objects to trade, but states that future work may clarify the relationship of the Safety Harbor and Caloosahatchee cultures. Luer and Almy note that temple mounds south of Charlotte Harbor differ significantly from Safety Harbor temple mounds in form. Luer has also argued that other materials found in burial mounds south of Charlotte Harbor belong to a South Florida, or "Glades Cult", artifact complex. Luer also argues that the presence of Mississippian culture and St. Johns culture artifacts in burial mounds shows that such articles, along with Safety Harbor objects, were traded into the area. It is possible that the towns in the region hosted a community of Apalachee potters. Their pottery-making techniques were passed down from master to apprentice and kept within a tightly knit network. The temper used to make the ceramics was a mix of local grog and a small portion of grog from their original homeland further north. Their pottery was Mississippian in character, unlike local pottery and was likely used for ceremonial and other important occasions.

The Safety Harbor culture developed in place from the preceding Manasota culture, a Weeden Island-related culture of the central Florida Gulf coast. Safety Harbor was influenced by the Mississippian culture, with some ceramics resembling the Mississippian-related Fort Walton culture and incorporating symbols of the Southeastern Ceremonial Complex; however, the people of the Safety Harbor culture had not adopted an agricultural economy, and, consequently, the culture did not become Mississippian. Safety Harbor mounds were typically built on late Weeden Island period mounds.

Changes in decorated ceramics and the presence of European artifacts support a division of the Safety Harbor culture into four phases. Pre-contact phases were the Englewood, 900-1100 and the Pinellas, 1100-1500. Phases during the Spanish colonial period included Tatham, 1500-1567, and Bayview, 1567-1725.

== Mounds ==
The Safety Harbor culture is defined by the presence of burial mounds with ceramics decorated with a distinctive set of designs and symbols. Ceramics found elsewhere at Safety Harbor sites (in middens and village living areas) are almost always undecorated. Major Safety Harbor sites had platform, or temple, mounds. The term "temple mound" is based on the description by members of the de Soto expedition of a temple on a constructed earthwork mound in a Safety Harbor village. Bullen and Milanich state that the temples were likely charnel houses, where bodies were prepared and stored for later burial. Several of the temple mounds have been destroyed since the 19th century, but at least fifteen have been documented as having once existed around Tampa Bay and on the Gulf coast near Tampa Bay. These temple mounds were rectangular and had flat tops, usually with a ramp leading up to the top on one side.

=== Temple mounds ===
Known Safety Harbor sites with "temple" mounds include:

- Anclote Temple Mound, near the mouth of the Anclote River, now destroyed.
- Anderson/Narvaez Temple Mound, in St. Petersburg.
- Bayshore Homes Temple Mound, in St. Petersburg, now destroyed.
- Dunedin Temple Mound, in Dunedin, now destroyed.
- Fort Brooke Temple Mound, at the site of Fort Brooke in Tampa, now destroyed.
- Harbor Key Temple Mound (Bishop Harbor Temple Mound), on Bishop Harbor in Manatee County.
- Madira Bickel Temple Mound, in Manatee County, listed in the National Register of Historic Places.
- Maximo Point Temple Mound, in St. Petersburg.
- Mill Point Temple Mound on the Alafia River, now destroyed.
- Pillsbury Temple Mound, in Manatee County, mostly destroyed.
- Pinellas Point Temple Mound (or Hirrihigua Mound), in St. Petersburg.
- Safety Harbor Temple Mound, at Safety Harbor site in Safety Harbor, the type site for the Safety Harbor culture.
- Snead Island Temple Mound (Portavant Mound), in Manatee County.
- Weeden Island Temple Mound, at Weedon Island Preserve in St. Petersburg, now destroyed, the type site for the Weeden Island culture.
- Whitaker Temple Mound, on Sarasota Bay, now destroyed.

Possible Safety Harbor temple mound sites include:

- Bahia Beach Mound (8HI536), near the mouth of the Little Manatee River.
- Bull Frog Creek, south of the mouth of the Alafia River.
- Englewood, near Englewood.
- Harbor Key II, southwest of the Harbor Key Temple Mound.
- Kennedy, on Terra Ceia Island between the Harbor Key and Madira Bickel temple mounds.
- Oelsner Mound, near Port Richey in Pasco County.
- Thomas Mound (8HI1), near the mouth of the Little Manatee River, now destroyed, possibly the site of Uzita.

Three platform mounds east and south of Charlotte Harbor, the Acline Mound (Aqui Esta site, near Punta Gorda), Howard Shell Mound (Bokeelia Island, at the north end of Pine Island), and Brown's Mound (Pineland site, near Pineland on Pine Island), differ from Safety Harbor temple mounds in having a U-shaped platform, and no ramps. This difference in form may indicate the mounds belong to the Caloosahatchee culture instead of the Safety Harbor culture. Luer and Almy also note that the large Bostic Temple Mound in Hardee County, which is associated with a village area and burial mounds, was contemporary with Safety Harbor temple mounds. They suggest that this site was the center for a distinct cultural and political system oriented to the Peace River valley. There are two "truncated rectangular" mounds at the Crystal River site that have mentioned as possible Safety Harbor temple mounds, but the other mounds there pre-date Safety Harbor, and there is little evidence of Safety Harbor use of the site. A large flat-topped shell mound, the Withlacoochee River Platform Mound, is next to the Withlacoochee River in Citrus County, but it has not been investigated. Whether it has any connection to the Safety Harbor culture is unknown.

Luer and Almy used the reported height, shape and dimensions of thirteen of the temple mounds to calculate their volume. They used this data to classify the mounds: Class A, consisting of the Anclote and Snead Island temple mounds, had high volumes (7000 to 7700 m³), low heights (4 m or less), and large summit platforms (greater than 1000 m² in area). Class B, including the Safety Harbor and Bayshore Homes temple mounds, had high volumes of 6500 to 6900 m³, were tall (greater than 5 m), and had a summit platform 440 to 760 m² in area. The nine remaining temple mounds varied in height and shape, but were much lower in volume, 3500 m³ or less. Luer and Almy note that the four mounds in Classes A and B are spaced along the coast line about 25 to 30 km apart, while the smaller Class C mounds are often much closer to each other and to the major mounds. Luer and Almy suggest that the temple mounds represent a hierarchy, with the four largest mounds serving as regional centers, and the smaller mounds located at subsidiary villages and serving different purposes. On the other hand, Milanich suggests that the centers of political units may have moved from time to time, and that only some of the temple mounds were in use at any given time.

=== Burial mounds ===
Burial mounds containing Safety Harbor ceramics are common in the Circum-Tampa Bay area, and are found scattered through the outlying areas. Burial mounds in the Northern Safety Harbor region include a mound at Weeki Wachee Springs, and the Ruth Smith and Tatham mounds in the Cove of the Withlacoochee. Burial mounds south of the Tampa Bay area include the Sarasota and Myakka Valley Ranches mounds. The Phillip Mound, close to the Kissimmee River in the Inland Safety Harbor area, contained a large number of Safety Harbor ceramics.

The Tocobaga kept the bodies of recently dead people in their temples or charnel houses until the bones had been cleaned. The Spanish visitors described the bodies as being wrapped in painted deer hides and stored in wooden boxes sitting on the ground. One of the Spanish captives of the Tocobaga reported that he had been assigned to guard a temple at night to keep wolves from carrying off the bodies. Garcilaso de la Vega reported that lions (cougars) would carry away bodies. After the bones had been cleaned, they would be buried. A Spanish account of a chief's funeral states that his body was "broken up" and placed in large jars, and the flesh was removed from the bones over two days. The skeleton was then reassembled and left in the temple for four days while the people fasted. At the end of the four days, all the people of the town would take the bones and place them in a burial mound. In some cases bodies were cremated and then buried in the mound on which the charnel house sat.

=== Destruction of mounds ===
As was the case in much of Florida, a vast majority of the Tampa Bay area's temple mounds, burial mounds, and middens were destroyed during development as the local population grew rapidly in the early to mid 20th century. Developers sought to level land near the water, and road construction crews found that bulldozed shell mounds made for excellent road fill. State and federal laws now afford protection to sites that contain human remains or are located on public land, but preservation of other archeological sites on private land is optional and encouraged by offering tax deductions and other incentives.

== People ==
The Spanish reported four social classes among the Safety Harbor people: chiefs, headmen, warriors and ordinary people, and slaves. Europeans and members of other tribes who had been captured were slaves. A chief who visited de Soto in his camp was carried there on the back of another man. Chiefs were often married to the sisters of other chiefs.

The Safety Harbor people ate fish, shellfish, deer, turtles and dogs, as well as watercress, pumpkins, "cabbage" from palmettos or cabbage palms, and beans. Maize may have been a minor part of the diet, but the southern limit of maize agriculture prior to the arrival of the Europeans was to the north of Tampa Bay. They used bows and arrows, equipped with stone arrowheads or stingray stingers. Houses were built with wooden posts and covered with palm leaves. "Temples" (or charnel houses) and other buildings were decorated with wood carvings. Pottery used in daily life was largely undecorated, but ceremonial vessels (found in burials) were distinctively decorated (the defining characteristic of the Safety Harbor culture).

== Chiefdoms ==
The name "Tocobaga" is often used to refer to all of the indigenous peoples of the Tampa Bay area during the first Spanish colonial period (1513-1763). In a strict sense, Tocobaga was the name of a chiefdom, its main town, and its chief, all of which were probably centered at the Safety Harbor site at the north end of Old Tampa Bay. Other Safety Harbor chiefdoms named in Spanish accounts include Mocoso, on the east side of Tampa Bay, Pohoy (Capaloey), possibly on the north side of Hillsborough Bay, and Uzita, on the south side of Tampa Bay. The chief of Mocoso also named Neguarete and Orriygua as neighboring chiefs, but it is not known if they were in the Safety Harbor culture area. It is not known what these chiefdoms shared aside from the Safety Harbor culture. Hernando de Escalante Fontaneda, a captive of south Florida Indians for many years in the early 16th century, described Tocobaga as "King head chief of that district", but also described Tocobaga and Mocoso as independent "Kingdoms".

The accounts of the de Soto expedition (which do not mention Tocobaga) state that Mocoso and Uzita were subject to a chief called Urriparacoxi or Paracoxi, who lived 30 leagues east or northeast of Tampa Bay. The people of Mocoso and of Uzita were noted as having spoken different languages. Hann argues that the language of the Mocoso people was Timucuan. There is no mention of Mocoso or Uzita in Spanish records after the passage of the de Soto expedition. The chiefdom of Tocobaga was apparently the major power in the Tampa Bay area during the later half of the 16th century, especially at the time of Pedro Menéndez de Avilés's visit in 1567. Tocobaga's power apparently waned in the 17th century, with first the Pohoy, and then the Calusa, becoming the dominant power in the Tampa Bay area. By around 1700, however, the Safety Harbor culture had virtually disappeared due to disease and incursions by other Native Americans from the north.
