= Madira Bickel Mound State Archaeological Site =

Archaeological site in Florida, United States

- IUCN category V (protected landscape/seascape)
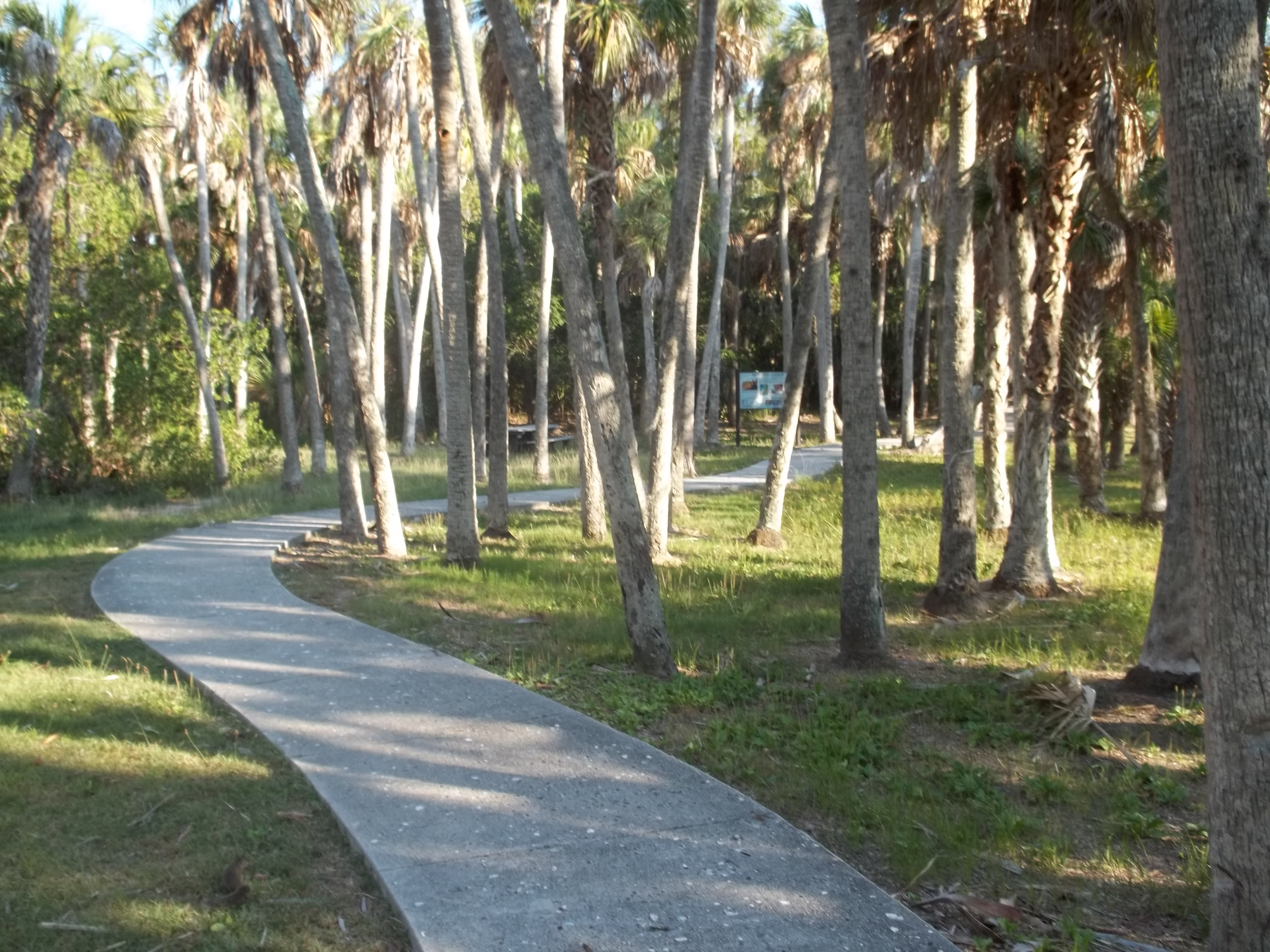
- Path leading to the mound

- Location within Florida Location within the United States
- Interactive map of Madira Bickel Mound State Archaeological Site
- Location: Manatee County, Florida, USA
- Nearest city: Palmetto, Florida
- Coordinates: 27°33′55″N 82°35′34″W
- Area: 4.0 ha (10 acres)
- Established: 16 March 1949
- Governing body: Florida Department of Environmental Protection
- Madira Bickel Mound
- U.S. National Register of Historic Places
- NRHP reference No.: 70000190
- Added to NRHP: 12 August 1970

The Madira Bickel Mound State Archaeological Site is an archaeological site on Terra Ceia Island in northwestern Palmetto, Florida, United States. It is located on Bayshore Drive, west of U.S. 19, a mile south of I-275. On August 12, 1970, it was added to the U.S. National Register of Historic Places. It is also a Florida State Park.

The 10-acre (0.040 km^{2}) site was the first Native American location in Florida to be designated as a State Archaeological Site.

== History ==
Archaeological excavations have established that indigenous occupation reaches back 2,000 years, and across three distinct periods: Manasota, Weedon Island, and Safety Harbor cultures. The people constructed a massive earthwork temple/ceremonial mound from shells, sand and detritus. It is still 20-foot (6.1 m) high, with a base nearly 100 by 170 feet (52 m).

Scholars believe that the mound site continued to be of great ceremonial importance to the historic Tocobaga Indians of the surrounding area, who coalesced as a people before European encounter in the late sixteenth century. They survived into the eighteenth century but disappeared as a tribe due to infectious diseases and warfare.

The site is named for Madira Bickel of Sarasota. She and her husband, Karl, purchased the land around the main mound and donated it to the state in 1948.

=== The mounds ===
The point of greatest interest at the site is the 20-foot (6.1 m) high temple/ceremonial mound. Composed of shells (obtained from a midden to the west), sand, and detritus, the mound's base is 100 feet (30 m) by 170 feet (52 m). To more easily reach the top, the Tocobaga constructed a curved 10-foot (3.0 m) wide ramp on the western side.

The state park has graduated stairways for access, and at the top, has cleared an area (protected by a fence) for overlooking the park. Over the centuries, the mound has become covered with vegetation, including tall trees.

Also in the park are the remains of the Prine Burial Mound, which is circular, about 40 feet (12 m) wide, and about 2 feet (0.61 m) high at the center. It was used through the three major archaeological cultures described above, from 800-1500 AD. Since settlement and development, much of the mound's contents have been disturbed.
