= Weeden Island culture =

Cultures of the Late Woodland period of the North American Southeast

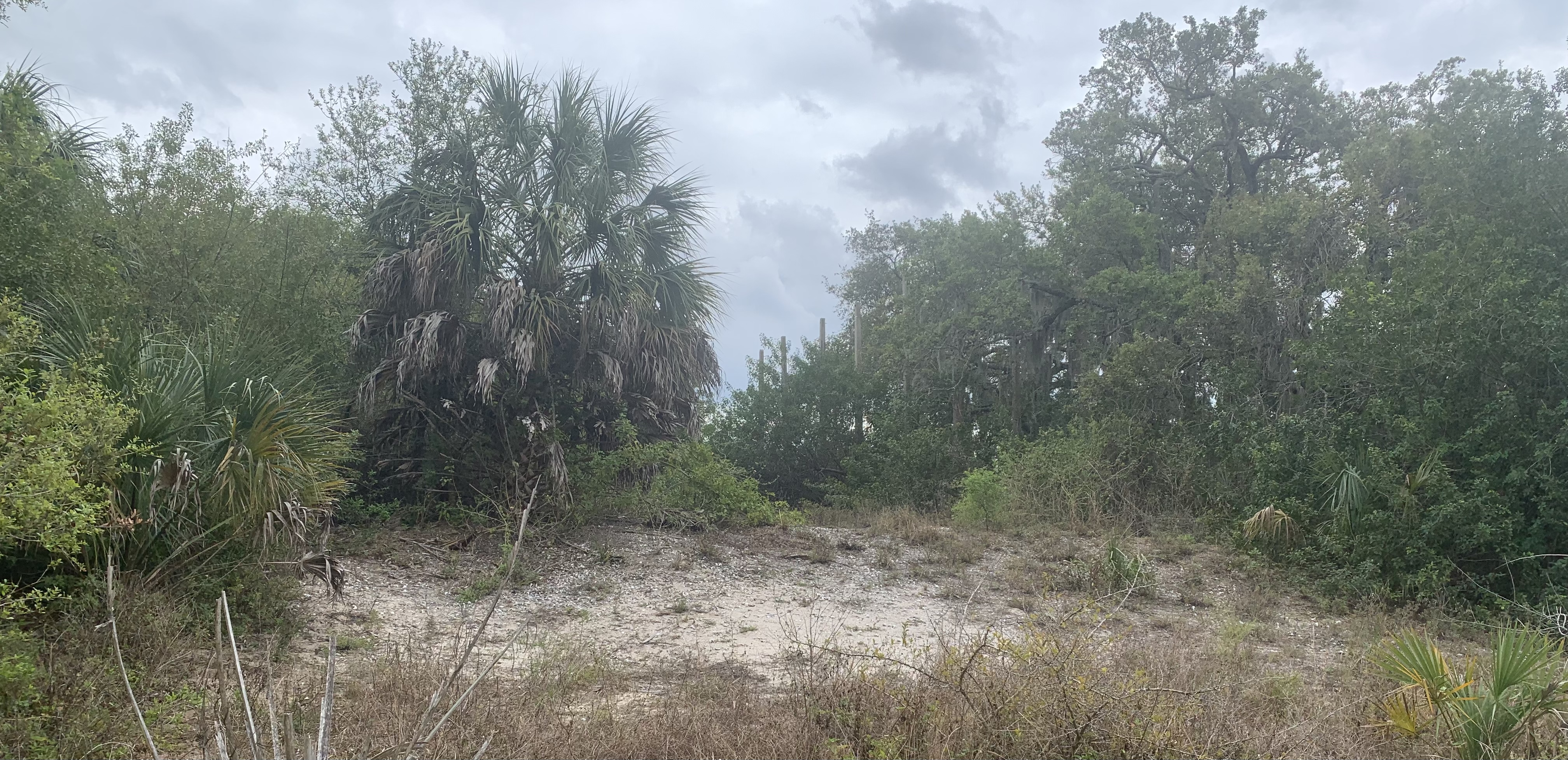
One of the living mounds at the Weedon island type site.

The Weeden Island cultures are a group of related archaeological cultures that existed during the Late Woodland period (500 - 1000 CE) of the North American Southeast. The name for this group of cultures was derived from the Weedon Island site (despite the dissimilar spellings) in Old Tampa Bay in Pinellas County.

== History ==
Weeden Island cultures are defined by ceramics, which fall into two categories, sometimes called secular and sacred. Sacred ceramics are found primarily in mounds, while secular ceramics are found primarily in middens and house sites. The two types of ceramics have separate histories, and the secular ceramics show considerable variation between regions. Milanich, et al. compare the Weeden Island sacred complex to the Hopewell and Mississippian complexes, i.e., a ceremonial complex practiced by several cultures.

Scholars believe that the secular components of Weeden Island cultures emerged from the Swift Creek culture during the Middle Woodland Period (ca. 200 - 500 CE) in the lower Chattahoochee-Apalachicola river drainage, where Alabama, Florida and Georgia meet. To the east of this Weeden Island heartland, Weeden Island secular components developed out of the Deptford culture, from which the Swift Creek culture had also developed. The sacred or ceremonial component of Weeden Island developed out of the Hopewell tradition-based Yent and Green Point traditions. It persisted in some areas until the end of the Woodland period ca. 1200. Weeden Island sites have been found from Mobile Bay to the Okefenokee Swamp, and from south of Tampa Bay to the fall line on the Chattahoochee River at Columbus, Georgia.

Although the multiple geographic variants of Weeden Island groups used slightly different subsistence strategies dictated by local environment (including small-scale agriculture in some areas), a trend toward the semi-sedentary hunter-gatherer exploitation of hardwood hammock areas and coastal/riverine marine resources accurately characterizes Weeden Island subsistence activities in general.

The site on Weedon Island where Weeden Island sacred ceramics were first described was excavated by Smithsonian Institution archaeologist J. Walter Fewkes in 1923 and 1924. Archaeologists now recognize that the Weedon Island site is well outside the heartland of the Weeden Island culture. The Weedon Island site was part of the Weeden Island-related late Manasota culture. The Manasota culture developed around 500 BCE, 700 years before the development of the Weeden Island sacred complex. The secular component of the Manasota culture had no connection with the secular components of heartland Weeden Island cultures.

== Geographic and temporal variants ==
Region	Weeden Island I		Weeden Island II	
Chattahoochee River valley	Kolomaki culture	350 - 750	Wakulla Weeden Island culture	750 - 1200
Flint River valley (Georgia) and Choctawhatchee River valley (Alabama)	"heartland" Weeden Island cultures		Wakulla Weeden Island culture	750 - 1200
Florida north peninsular Gulf coast	North peninsular coast Weeden Island culture	200 - 900		
North Florida	McKeithen Weeden Island culture	200 - 700		
Northwest Florida	Weeden Island Northwest culture	300 - 900	Fort Walton culture	900 - European contact
Southeast Alabama	Undefined Weeden Island culture variant(s)			
Southwest Georgia	Undefined Weeden Island culture variant(s)			
Associated culture - Weeden Island ceremonialism adopted by non-Weeden Island culture
Tampa Bay area	late Manasota culture	300 - 800		
North central Florida	middle Cades Pond culture	300 - 500		

Recent efforts have refined the Weeden Island culture concept so that the term "Weeden Island" includes several distinct regional manifestations which exhibited the same basic ceremonial complex (most likely associated with shared sociopolitical patterns), but that exhibited significant geographic variations. These include: the North peninsular Gulf Coast variant, found along the Gulf coast from Pasco County to the Aucilla River; the Cades Pond culture in north-central Florida; the McKeithen Weeden Island culture in northernmost inland Florida; the Manasota culture located within the central Peninsular Gulf Coast; the Northwest culture, extending from the Aucilla River through the Florida Panhandle to Mobile, Alabama; the early Kolomoki culture, located in the lower Chattahoochee Valley; the later Wakulla Weeden Island culture, in the lower Chattahoochee Valley, the lower Flint River valley, in southwestern Georgia, and the upper Choctawhatchee River valley in southeastern Alabama. Undefined Weeden Island culture variants are found in southeastern Alabama and southwestern Georgia outside the Kolomoki/Wakulla Weeden Island areas.

Several attempts have been made to segregate Weeden Island components into chronological phases based on temporal changes in settlement patterns, artifact assemblage, and ceremonial activities, all of which recognize an inherent distinction between the material culture of earlier and later Weedon Island manifestations. It is most widely accepted that the Weeden Island culture be split into two time periods: the Weeden Island I Period (200 AD - 700 AD) and Weeden Island II Period (700 AD - 1200 AD). Some Weeden Island II cultures later developed into local variants of the Mississippian culture, collectively known as proto-Mississippian.

The Weeden Island culture was preceded by the Deptford culture (and the later Swift Creek and Santa Rosa-Swift Creek cultures in the panhandle). It was followed by the Alachua culture in the Cades Pond culture area, by the Suwannee Valley culture in the McKeithen culture area and by the Fort Walton Culture in the Northwest area (the panhandle).

Several archaeologists including William Sears indicate "that there was a sharp dichotomy between sacred and the secular" artifacts (particularly ceramics) within the Weeden Island culture, though this pattern has not been observed west of the Aucilla River.

"The social organization characteristic of ... Weeden Island sites appears to have lain somewhere between the basically egalitarian structure of Archaic hunter-gatherers and the chiefdoms characteristic of Mississippian society...over these centuries, the social, political, and ideological institutions of later Weedon Island agricultural communities and their contemporaries evolved into those associated with the Mississippian".

=== North peninsular Gulf coast region ===
The north peninsular Gulf coast variant of the Weeden Island culture existed along the Gulf of Mexico coast of Florida from the Aucilla River southward to what is now Pasco County. It also included such inland wetland areas as the Cove of the Withlacoochee (in Citrus County) and Gulf Hammock (in southern Levy County), as well as coastal sites such as the Crystal River site. This region has not received as much attention from archeologists as have other variants of the Weeden Island culture. While a number of sites have been surveyed, most of the mounds and shell middens in the area have been disturbed or destroyed by artifact hunters and "borrowing" for road-building material, and there have been no major excavations of sites in the region.

As in other Weeden Island areas, there is a difference between ceremonial/prestige pottery, found primarily in burial mounds, and the utilitarian pottery found in village sites and shell middens. The prevalence of undecorated pottery and the lack of major excavations means that the chronology of the Weeden Island culture in the north peninsular Gulf coast is poorly understood.

The Weeden Island culture was not uniform over the north peninsular Gulf coast. Ceramics related to the Swift Creek culture are found scattered at early sites throughout the area, but particularly so in Taylor County, the northernmost part of the region. Later sites in Taylor County show some influence from the Fort Walton culture. In Dixie County, to the south of Taylor County, later sites appear to have been influenced by the Alachua culture, which developed out of the Cades Pond variant of the Weeden Island culture. Later sites in the southern part of the region show influence from the Safety Harbor culture.

Primary habitation sites were concentrated along the coast, with smaller sites adjacent to inland waterways. The inhabitants left numerous shell middens, composed primarily of oyster shells, but also including clam, scallop, whelk and conch shells. Fish of various kinds were another important component of the diet. Sea turtles, tortoises, alligators and deer were also consumed. Horticulture was absent or a late introduction, although the inhabitants of the southern end of the region (Pasco and Hernando counties) were growing maize at the time of first European contact.

=== McKeithen Weeden Island culture ===
The McKeithen Weeden Island culture was a regional variant of early Weeden Island culture in north Florida. The area of the McKeithen Weeden Island culture was north of the Santa Fe River, extending east from the Aucilla River to the western edge of the St. Johns River drainage basin. It lasted about 500 years, from 200 to 700. It was succeeded by the Suwannee Valley culture.

The McKeithen culture is named after a landowner who invited archaeologists to excavate some mounds on his property before vandals destroyed them. The McKeithen site was a village next to a stream with three mounds. These three mounds were created in an isosceles triangle, with the main axis of the triangle pointing towards the summer solstice sunrise. The mounds were likely built between 350-475 CE. Abundant evidence of occupation was found in a crescent around a presumed plaza, which was essentially bare of artifacts. The three mounds flanked the plaza on three sides. Wood and charcoal found in the village have yielded radiocarbon dates of AD 200 to 750.

The mounds served different purposes. The one named (arbitrarily) 'B' had a rectangular building on it that has been interpreted to be a temple or the residence of the priest who conducted ceremonies for the dead. The presumed holder of that office was buried inside the building. Evidence of animals chewing on some bones indicate that the body was exposed for a while after death before burial. A tomb of wood and earth was erected over the grave. The tomb and building were then burned, and the ashes scattered. After a ceramic bird head was pushed into the ground at the foot of the grave, a layer of dirt was spread over all of the mound. Three radiocarbon dates for this event average to 354.

Mound 'A' was a charnel area where bodies were cleaned and buried temporarily. A wall of posts screened a number of burial pits from the village. Posts up to two feet in diameter apparently were used to mark graves. The decomposed bodies were later removed, and bones were bundled and moved to mound 'C'. Numerous potsherds and many small fire pits are interpreted as evidence of ceremonies connected with processing the bodies. In 354 the wall of posts and other posts were piled up over the empty grave pits and burned.

Mound 'C' held a charnel house where bundled bones, typically a skull and limb bones, were stored. After some period of time, the bundles were buried around the periphery of the mound. In about 475, approximately 36 bone bundles were removed from the charnel house and buried. The charnel house was burned, then a fire was built of top of it for a feast. A large bowl with animal heads on its rim, which may have been used for serving ceremonial drinks such as the black drink, was left on the remains of the fire after its bottom was knocked out. At least 17 ceramic vessels, including hollow figurines of animals, were broken and left atop the graves of the bone bundles. The whole mound was then covered with a six-foot layer of earth.

Pottery at the McKeithen site has been classified as secular, prestige, and sacred. Secular pots were undecorated, or had minimal decoration, and were all made with clay from local sources. Prestige ware was decorated with lines and dots and sometimes 'painted' with red clay. This prestige ware was found most often in the mounds, but occasionally elsewhere in the village. The sacred vessels, which were found only in the mounds, were elaborately decorated and sometimes were in the shape of animals. Some of the sacred vessels apparently were imported, but the ones with animal shapes usually were made from local clay.
