= Aqui Esta Burial Mound =

Prehistoric burial site in Charlotte County, Florida, US

Aqui Esta Burial Mound (8CH68), also referred to as the Alligator Creek or Punta Gorda Mound, is a prehistoric sand burial mound located in Punta Gorda, Florida, United States.

== History ==
The multi-use burial mound has been associated with the Calusa. Five burials excavated early in the 20th century by Wainwright may have been from this mound. In 1975 the mound, which was originally circular, measured 24.4 metres (80 ft) wide by 42.7 metres (140 ft) long and 2.1 metres (6.9 ft) high. The mound has been excavated by several archaeologists, as well as amateurs and pot hunters. Around 100 burials have been found, mostly secondary, sometimes consisting of just a skull and the long bones. While the mound was probably in continuous use, a mass burial of 35-40 individuals was found. Ceramic and other artifacts recovered from the mound in 1975 by James Miller has made the Aqui Esta one of the most significant sites in peninsular Florida. Approximately 45 rare shell cups, along with exotic incised ceramics vessels from Fort Walton and St. John, both 200 miles (320 km) to the north, were excavated.

The most recent discovery by the ceramics curator for the Florida Museum of Natural History, in 2005, were examples of Safety Harbor ceramics that employed a paste containing mica, a mineral found closest in the Appalachians in Georgia. Luer concluded that the site correlates with the Safety Harbor culture, 1000–1200. Recent discoveries and theories by Martin Byers concerning the Hopewell culture and Mississippian culture indicate that Aqui Esta was a jointly created and maintained earthwork site used by trans-regional cult members. The mound therefore may date to the period assigned by Byers, 200 B.C.
