= Pinellas Point Mound =

Pinellas Point Mound is a temple mound. It is located inside Indian Mound Park in St. Petersburg, FL. The Princess Hirrihigua Indian Mound, which was originally created by the Tocobaga, is at the center of the park. There is a historical marker near the mound which was erected in 1960 by the Princess Hirrihigua Chapter of the Daughters of the American Revolution. The site was donated to the city of St. Petersburg, FL by Mr. Ed C. Wright in 1958.

The University of South Florida Libraries have created a reconstruction of the Pinellas Point Mound to show what the mound looked like prior to being partially destroyed in 1929. The reconstruction was based on an 1880 survey and a 2014 terrestrial laser scanning survey. While there are reports that human remains were removed from the area in the 1880s, it remains unclear whether there are more mounds in the park.
