= Manasota culture =

Archaeological culture in Florida, US

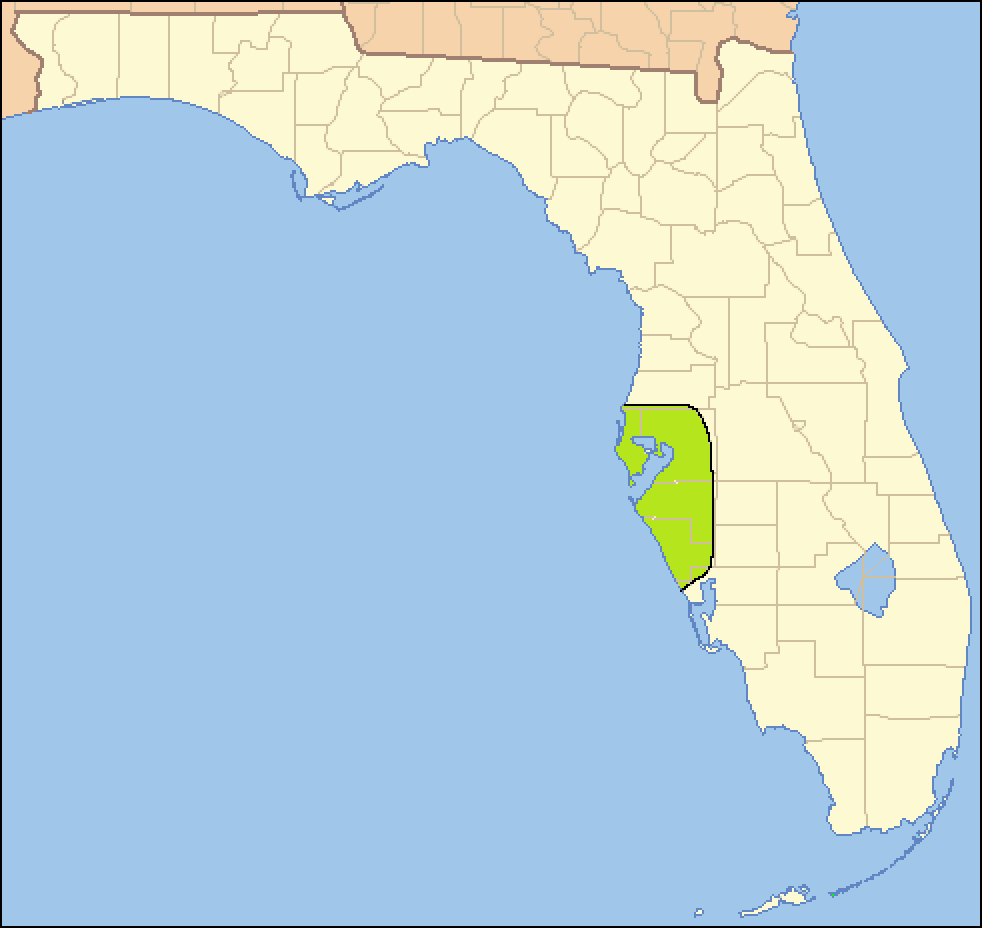
Map of the approximate area of the Manasota archaeological culture

The Manasota culture was an archaeological culture that was practiced on the central Gulf coast of the Florida peninsula from about 500 BCE until about 900, when it developed into the Safety Harbor culture. From about 300 to 700 the Manasota culture adopted the ceremonial ceramics and burial practices of the Weeden Island cultures of northern Florida and adjacent Alabama and Georgia.

The Manasota culture was defined by archaeologists George Luer and Marion Almy in 1979. Their definition partially replaced an earlier definition of a Perico Island tradition or culture, which failed to hold up under later research. Luer and Almy identify 25 archaeological sites around Tampa Bay and between Tampa Bay and Charlotte Harbor as belonging to the Manasota culture.

The Manasota culture incorporated ceremonial burial practices of the Weeden Island cultures starting around 300 until 700. Weeden Island sacred ceramics were first described at the Weedon Island site in Pinellas County. Generally speaking, the Manasota culture pottery was limited to sand-tempered, undecorated ceramics. The Weedon Island site was part of the Weeden Island-related late Manasota culture. Archaeologists now recognize that the Weedon Island site is well outside the heartland of the Weeden Island culture, and that the Manasota culture developed around 500 BCE, 700 years before the development of the Weeden Island sacred complex. The secular component of the Manasota culture had no connection with the secular components of heartland Weeden Island cultures.
