= Weedon Island Preserve =

Nature reserve in Florida, US

- IUCN category V (protected landscape/seascape)
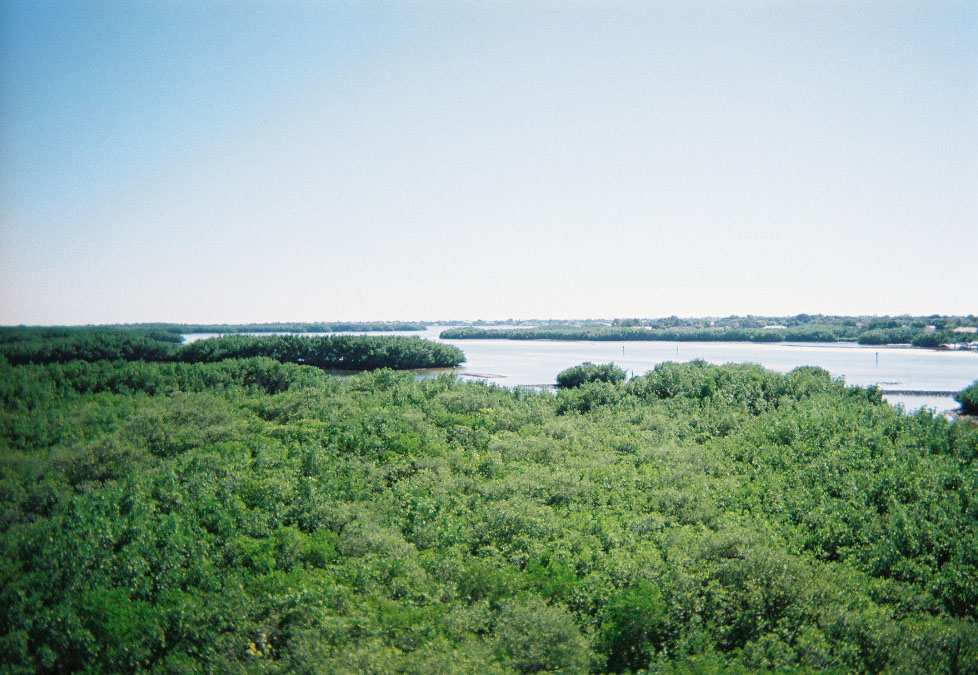
- View of the preserve from top of observation tower

- Location within Florida
- Location: Pinellas County, Florida, US
- Nearest city: St. Petersburg, Florida
- Coordinates: 27°50′42″N 82°36′07″W
- Established: June 13, 1972
- Governing body: Pinellas County Park Department
- Weedon Island Preserve
- U.S. National Register of Historic Places
- NRHP reference No.: 72000347

The Weedon Island Preserve is a 3,190-acre natural area situated along the western shore of Tampa Bay and located at 1800 Weedon Drive NE, St. Petersburg, Florida, United States. It is an estuarine preserve composed of upland and aquatic ecosystems, including mangrove forests, pine/scrubby flatwoods, and maritime hammocks, and is home to a variety of native wildlife. The preserve is also a designated archaeological area, with several shell mounds identified on the property that provide evidence of early peoples who inhabited the land for thousands of years.

On June 13, 1972, Weedon Island Preserve was added to the U.S. National Register of Historic Places. In 1974, the state of Florida purchased Weedon Island and its surrounding islands, which were officially opened for public use in December 1980. In 1993, the state created a lease agreement with Pinellas County to manage and maintain the preserve. The county's Department of Parks and Conservation Resources presently manages the area.

Weedon Island Preserve's name is derived from Tampa doctor and amateur archaeologist Leslie Washington Weedon.

== Recreational activities ==
The preserve offers 4.7 miles of nature trails for hiking, with 2 miles of boardwalks and paved, ADA-accessible trails, and the remaining 2.7 miles as natural trail loops. The 3,000-foot Tower Boardwalk trail leads visitors to a 45-foot-tall observation tower. Three additional observation platforms along the trails offer opportunities for bird and wildlife viewing and are ideal for photography.

In addition to hiking, the preserve maintains a 4-mile, self-guided canoeing/kayaking loop called the South Paddling Trail. The path weaves through mangrove tunnels within the preserve and has access points to the bay. Visitors interested in exploring the paddling trail may bring their own vessels or take a tour.

Other activities available include fishing from the pier at the end of Weedon Dr. NE and picnicing at any of the designated picnic tables.

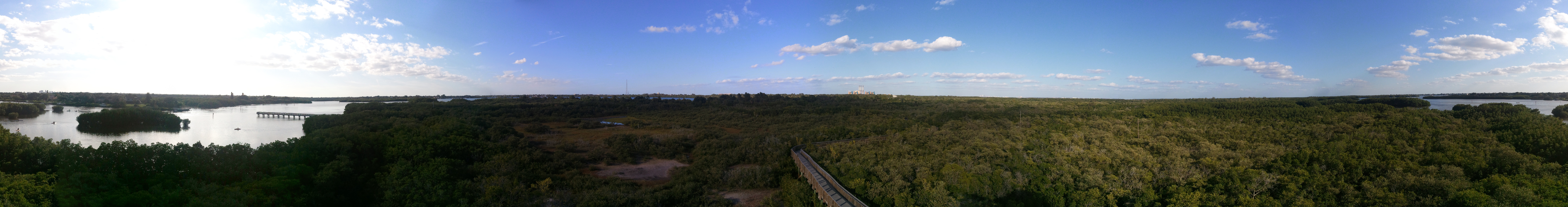
View from observation tower. Visible items on horizon, from left to right include: downtown St. Petersburg, Florida; WGES (AM) Antenna; Bartow Power Plant; downtown Tampa, Florida; MacDill Air Force Base; Big Bend Power Station.

== Weedon Island Preserve Cultural and Natural History Center ==
The Weedon Island Preserve Cultural and Natural History Center opened in December 2002 with the support of the Friends of Weedon Island and is run by Pinellas County Government. The center focuses on the natural, cultural, and archaeological history of the preserve. The Exhibit Hall features interactive displays on the unique wildlife and habitats found on Weedon Island and the ancient and present-day history of the preserve.

A 40 feet (12 m) dugout canoe found in the Weedon Island Preserve and believed to be a Manasotan artifact. It is estimated to be 1,100 years old.

== Ecosystem ==
The Weedon Island Preserve ecosystems are majority wetlands, including mangrove swamps, with 1,100 acres (4.5 km^{2}) of upland habitat. Flatwoods are represented with pine and scrub, as are coastal hammocks, coastal berms and anthropogenic shell mounds.

== Gallery ==
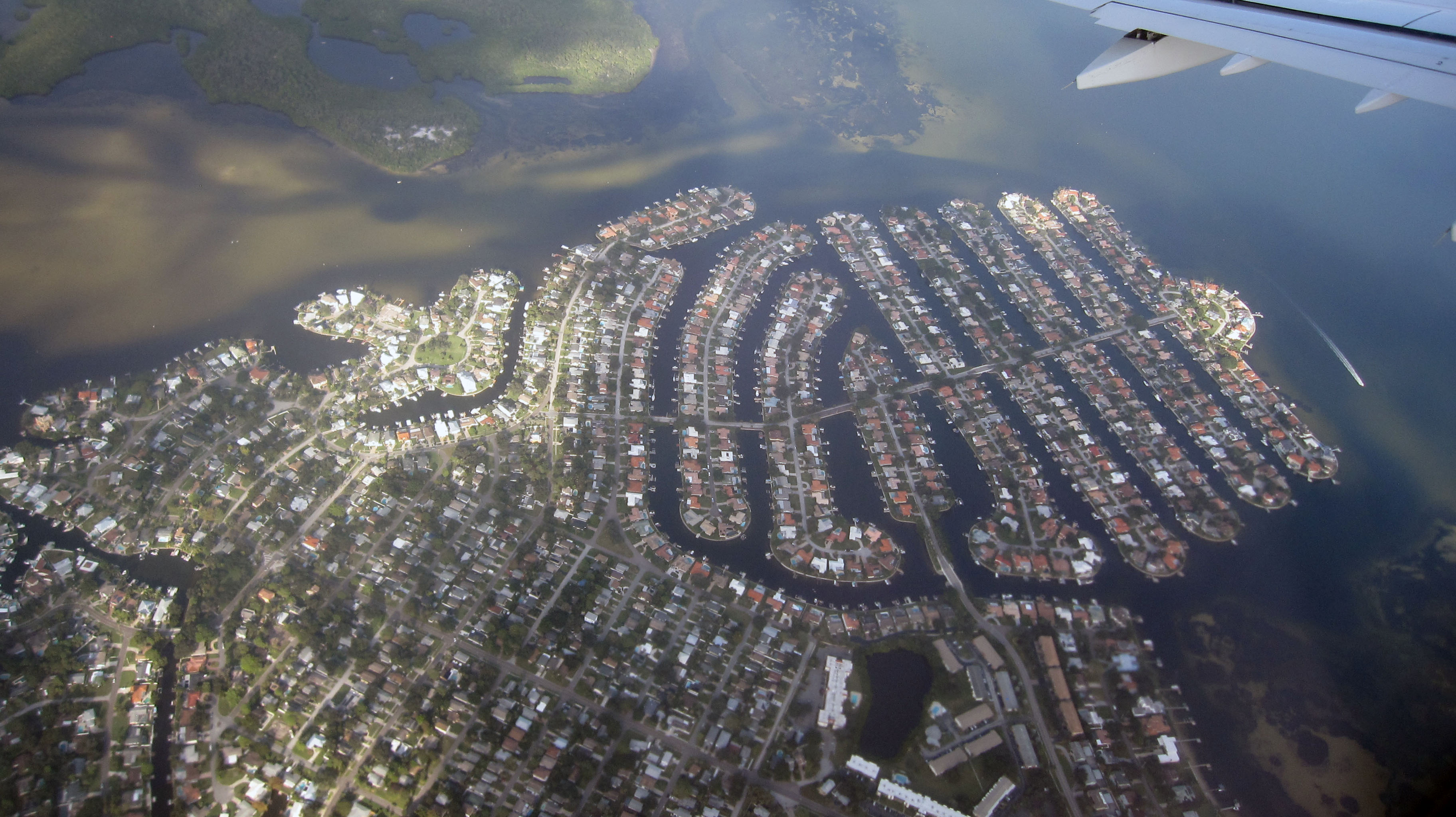
Aerial view of Venetian Isles, and Weedon Island Preserve (top)

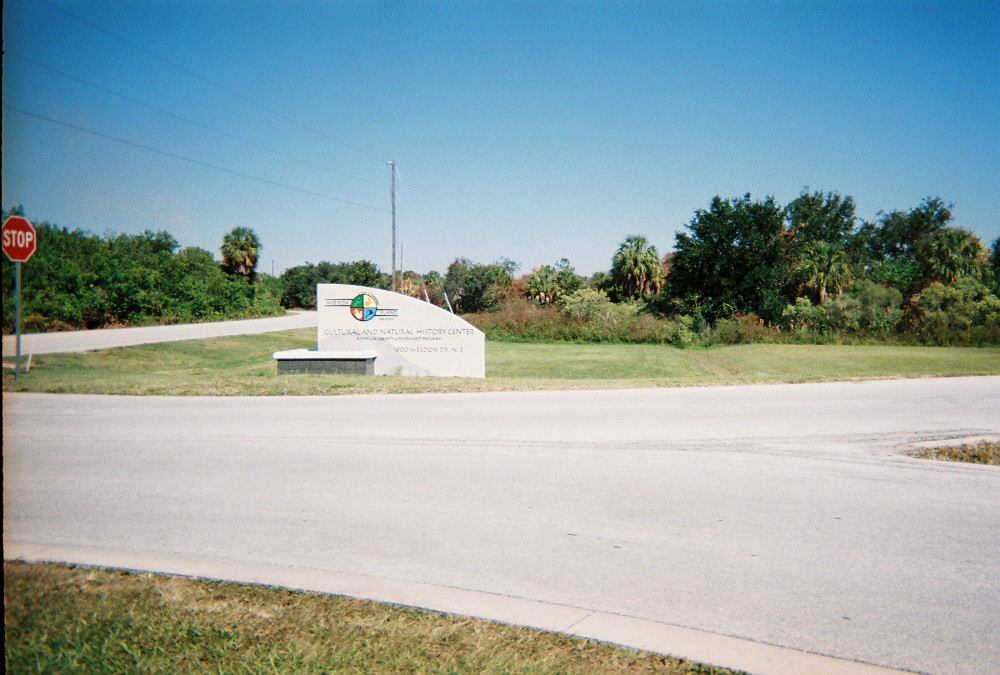
Entrance to Weedon Island Culture Center

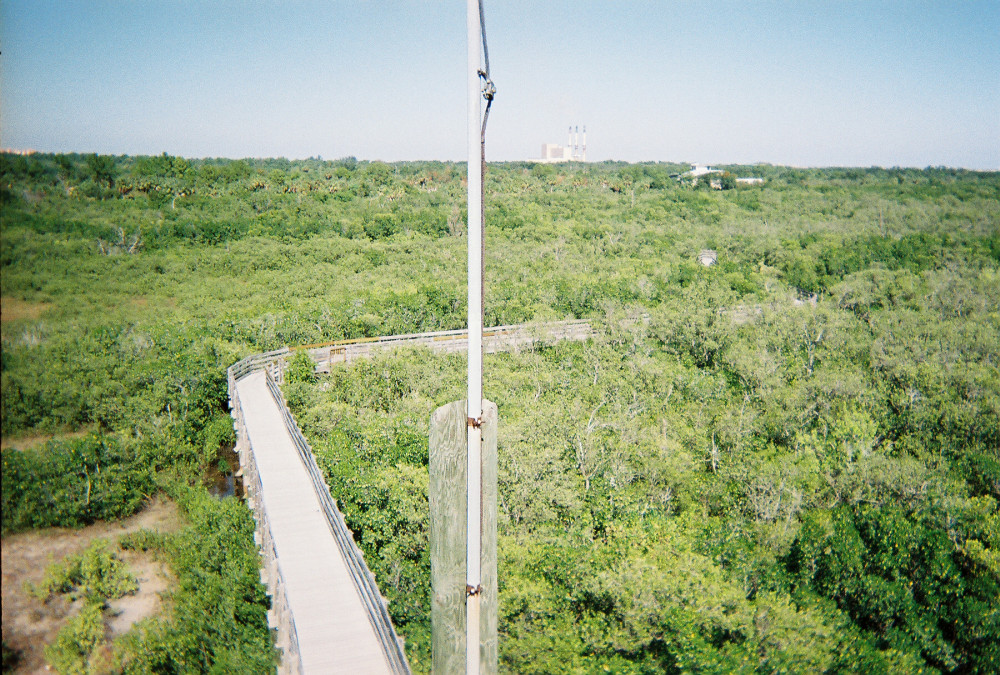
View of the boardwalk leading to the preserve's observation tower

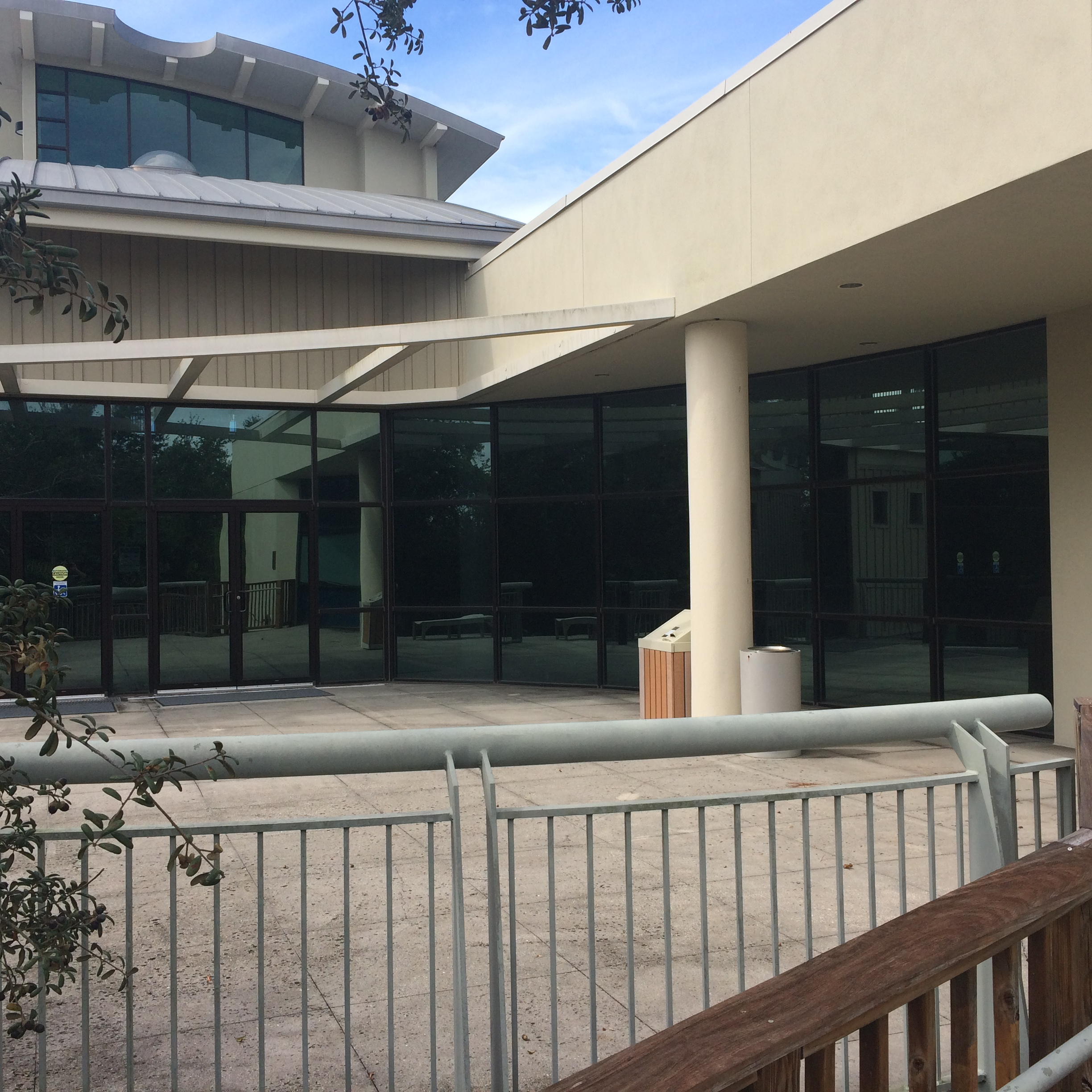
Weedon Island Preserve Cultural and Natural History Center (Entrance)

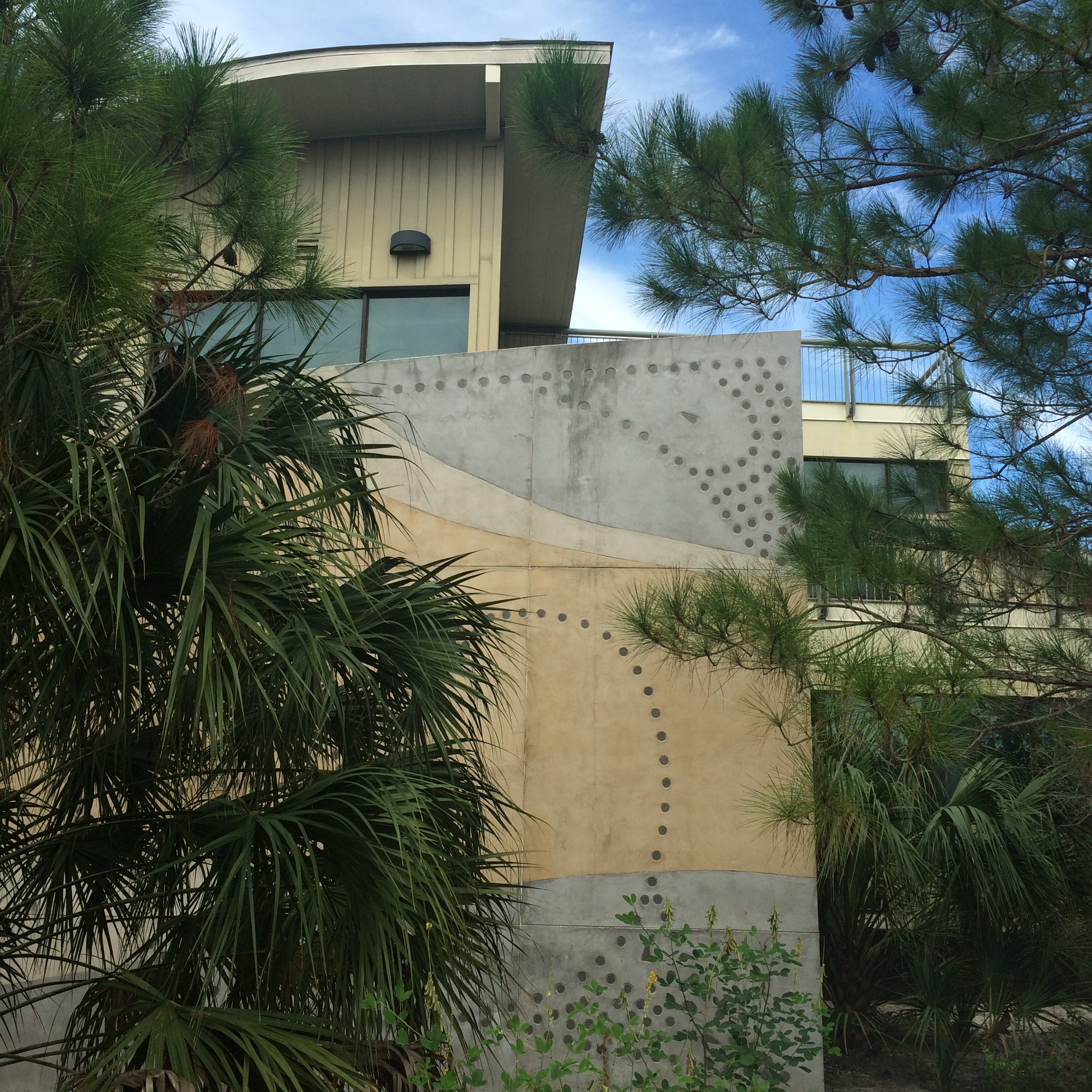
Weedon Island Preserve Cultural and Natural History Center

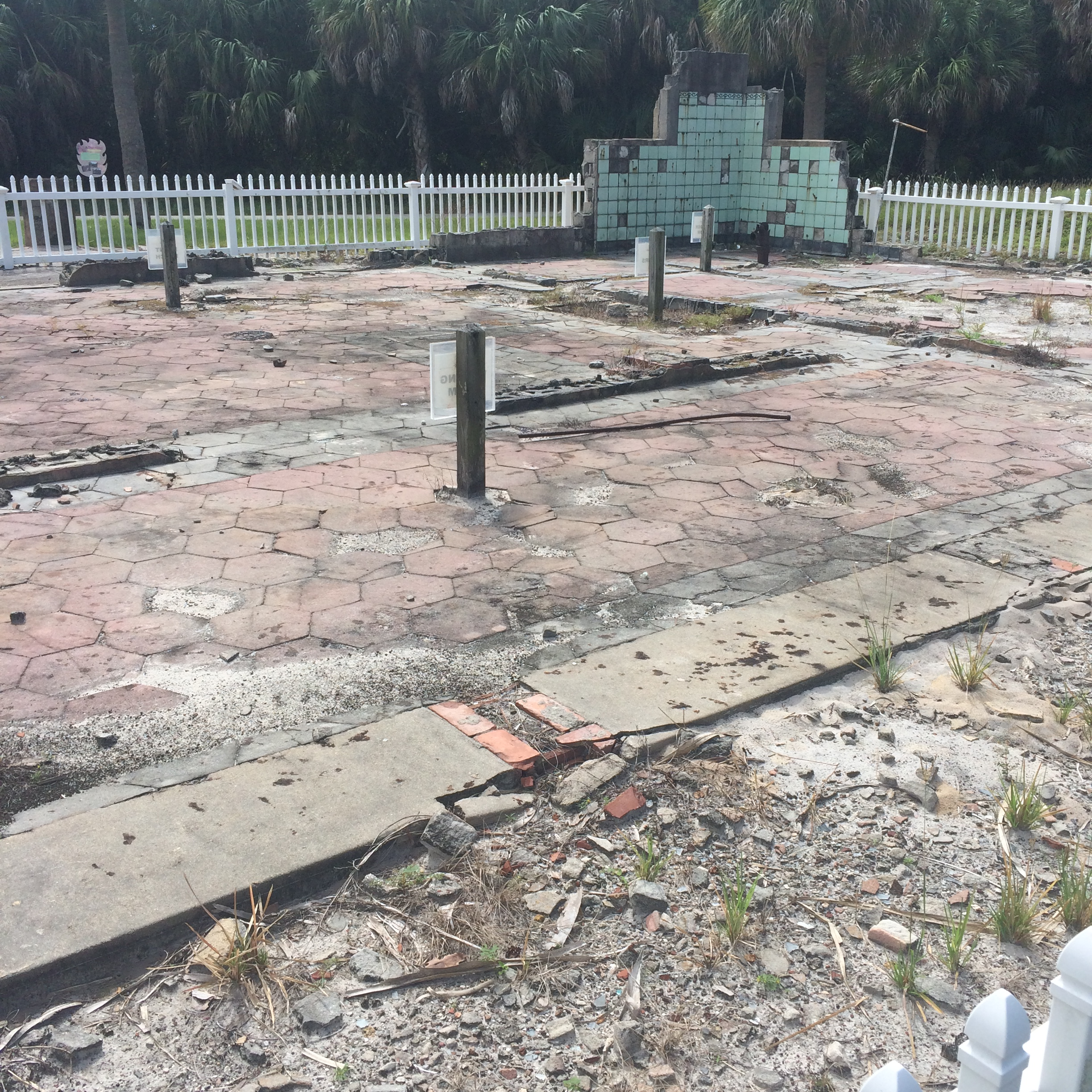
Airport waiting room ruins
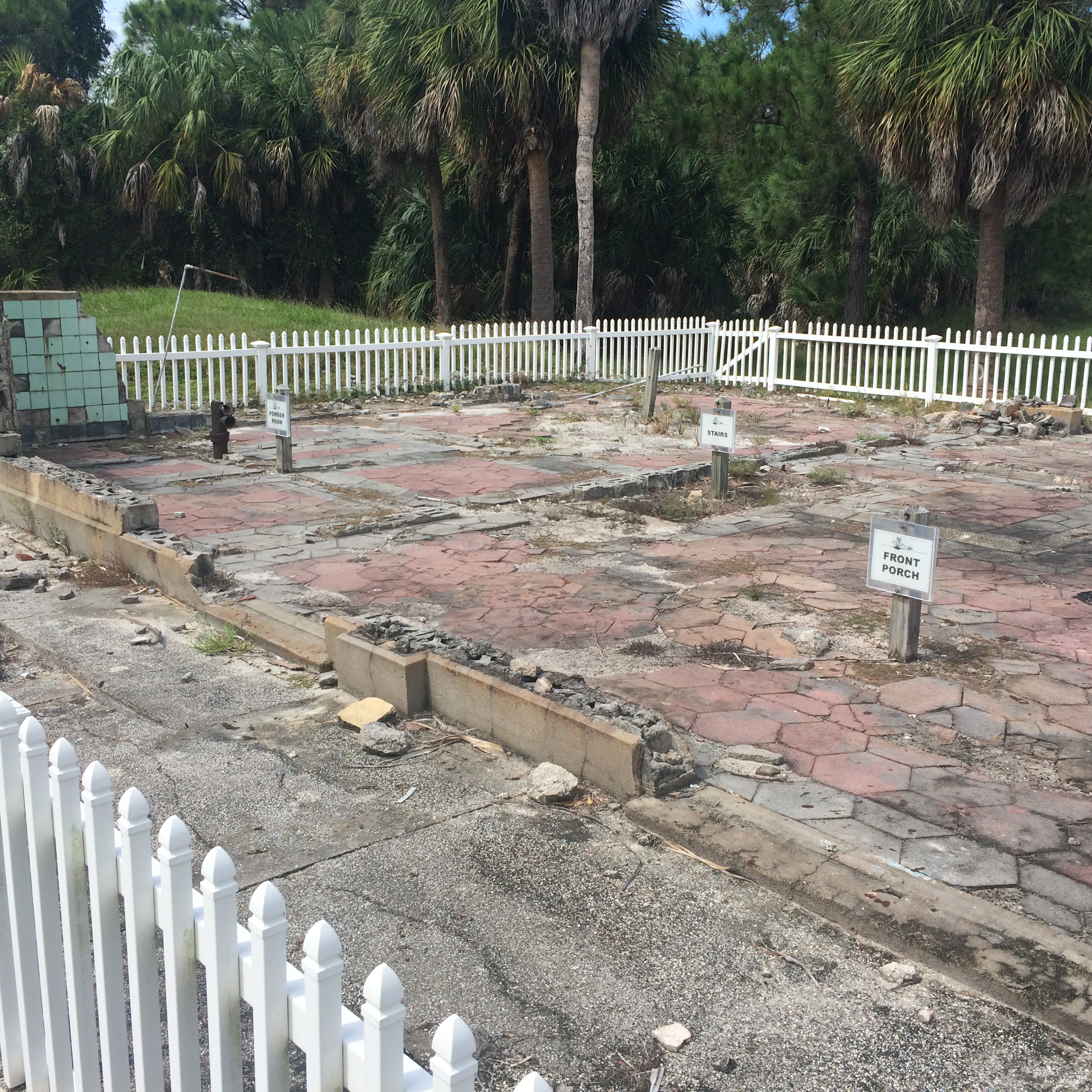
Airport waiting room ruins (from the trail)

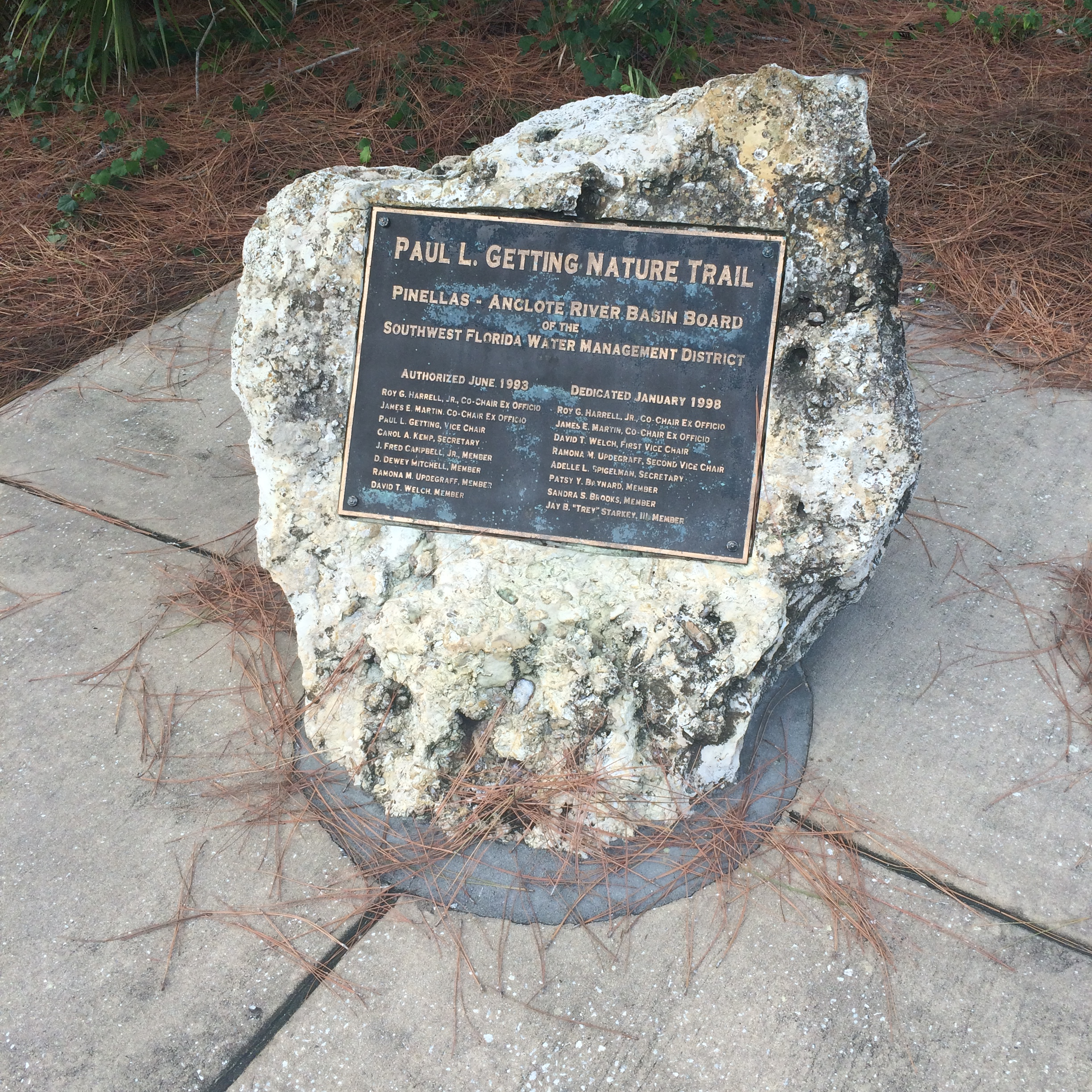
View of the dedication of the Paul L. Getting Nature Trail dedication

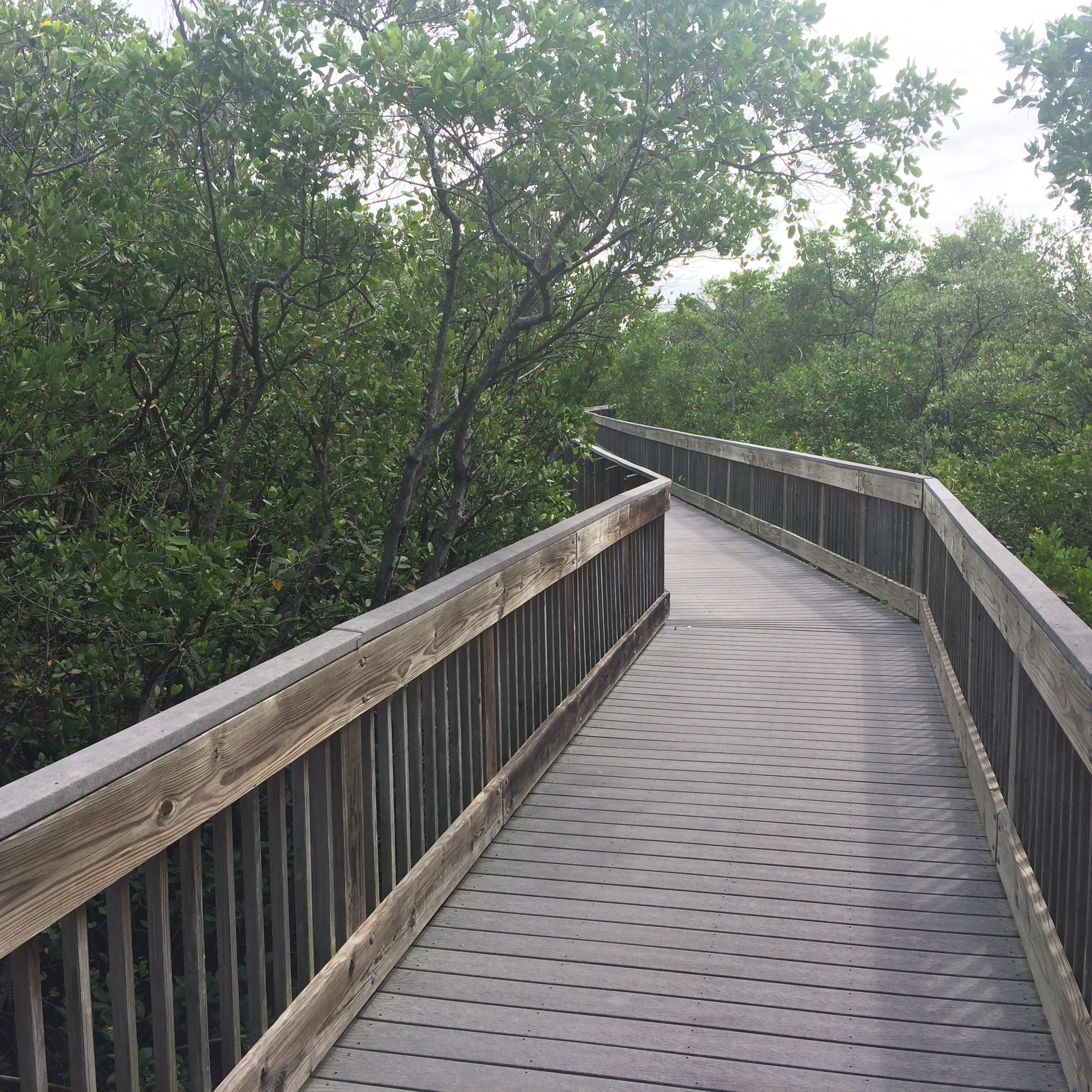
Elevated boardwalk

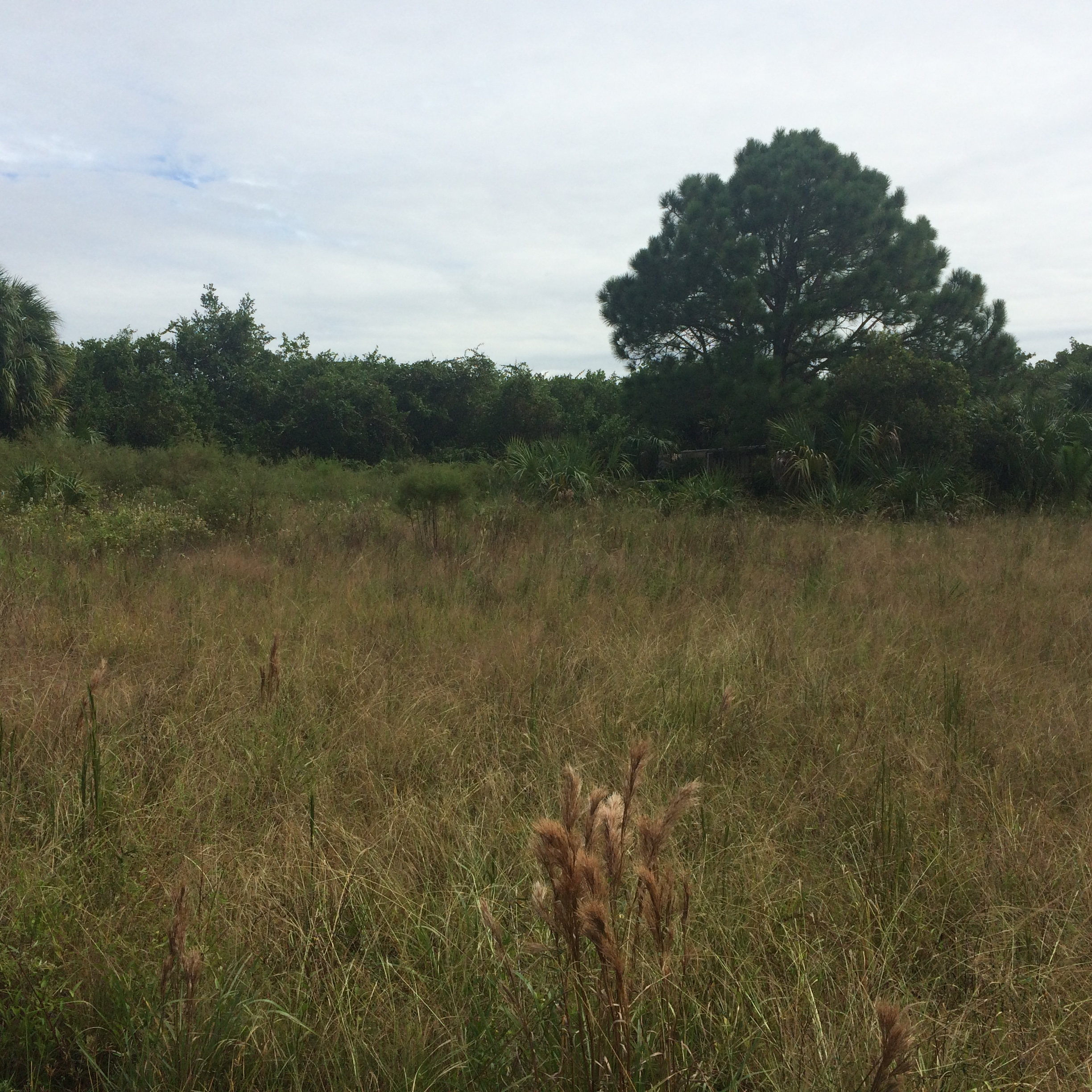
View from the boardwalk

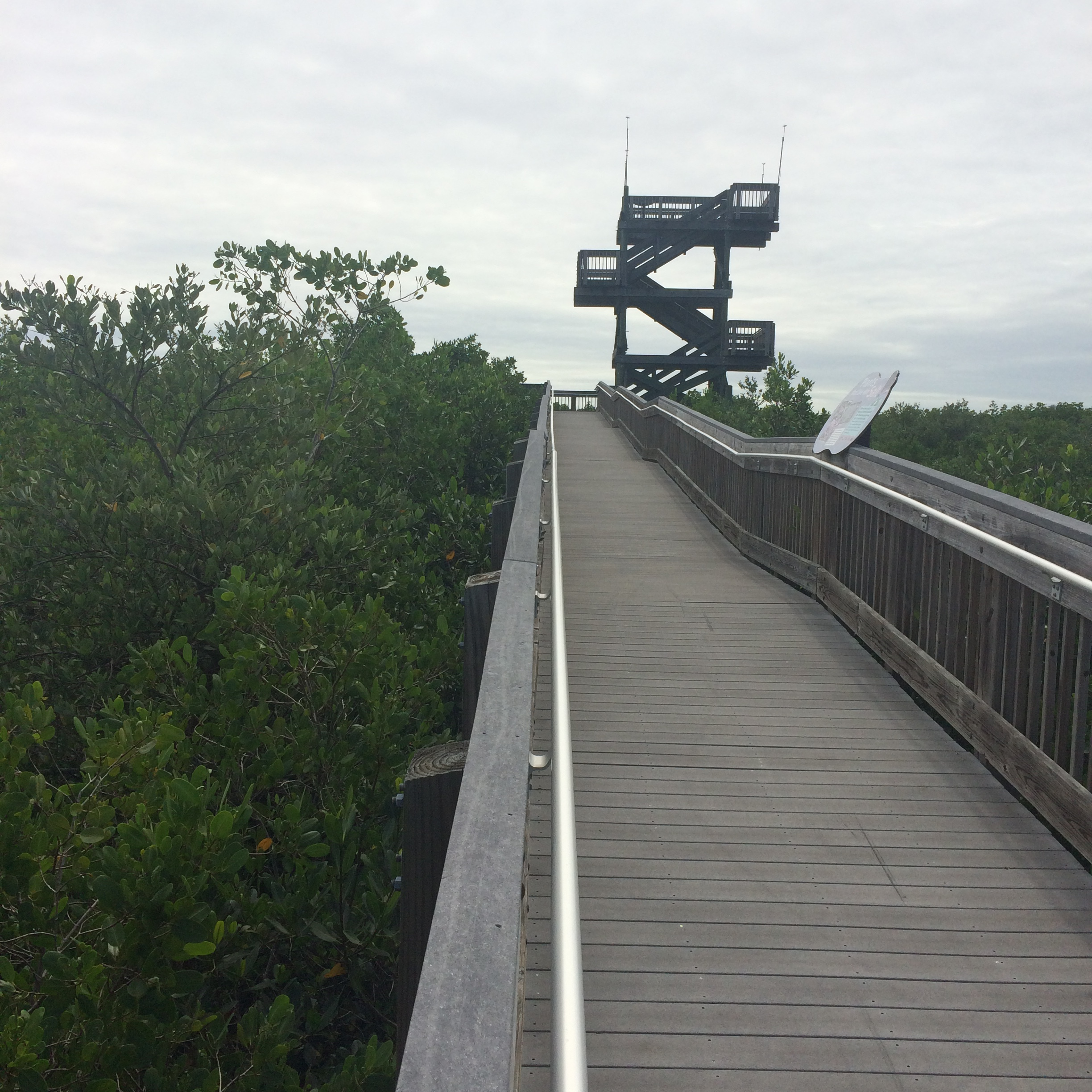
Observation tower
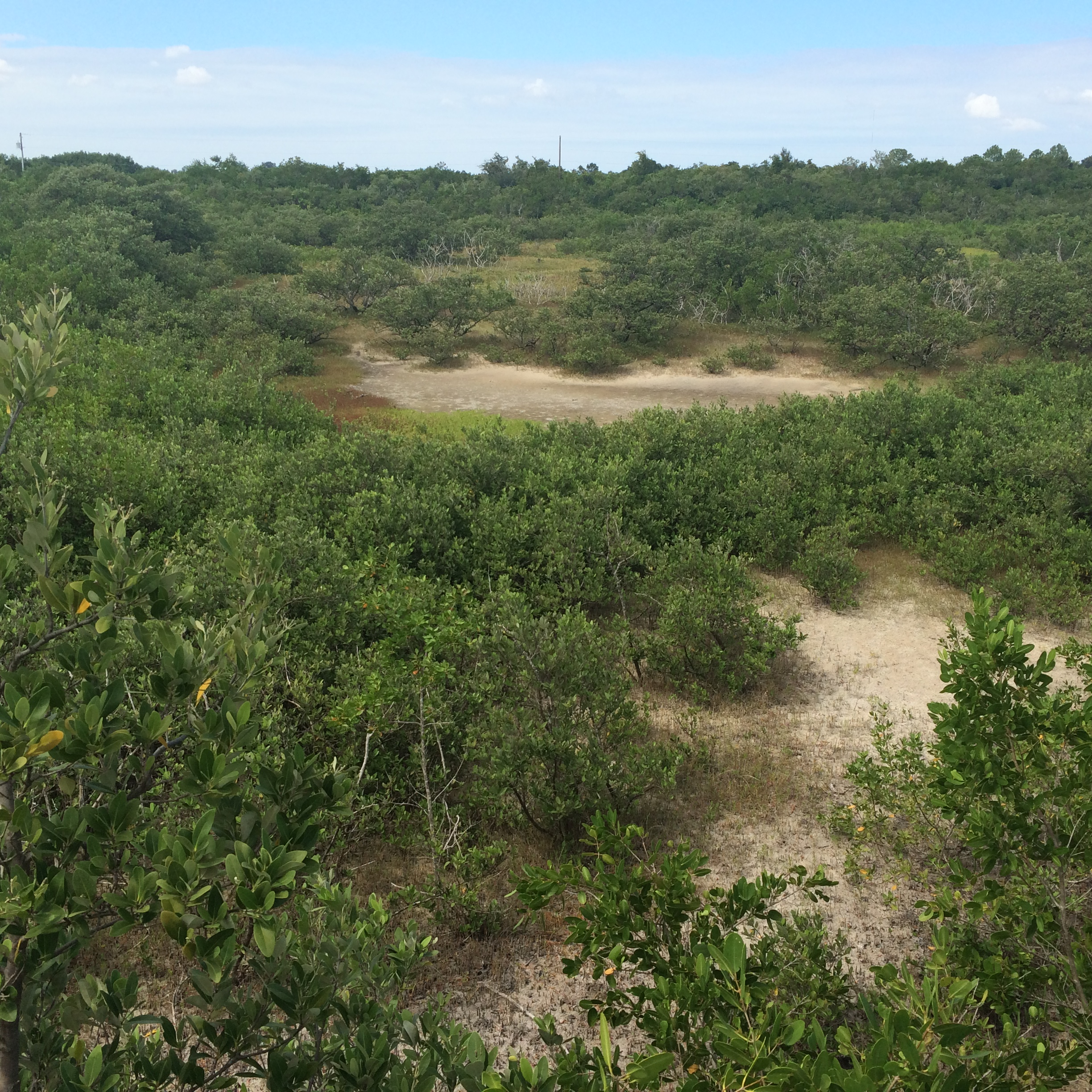
Mangrove hammock

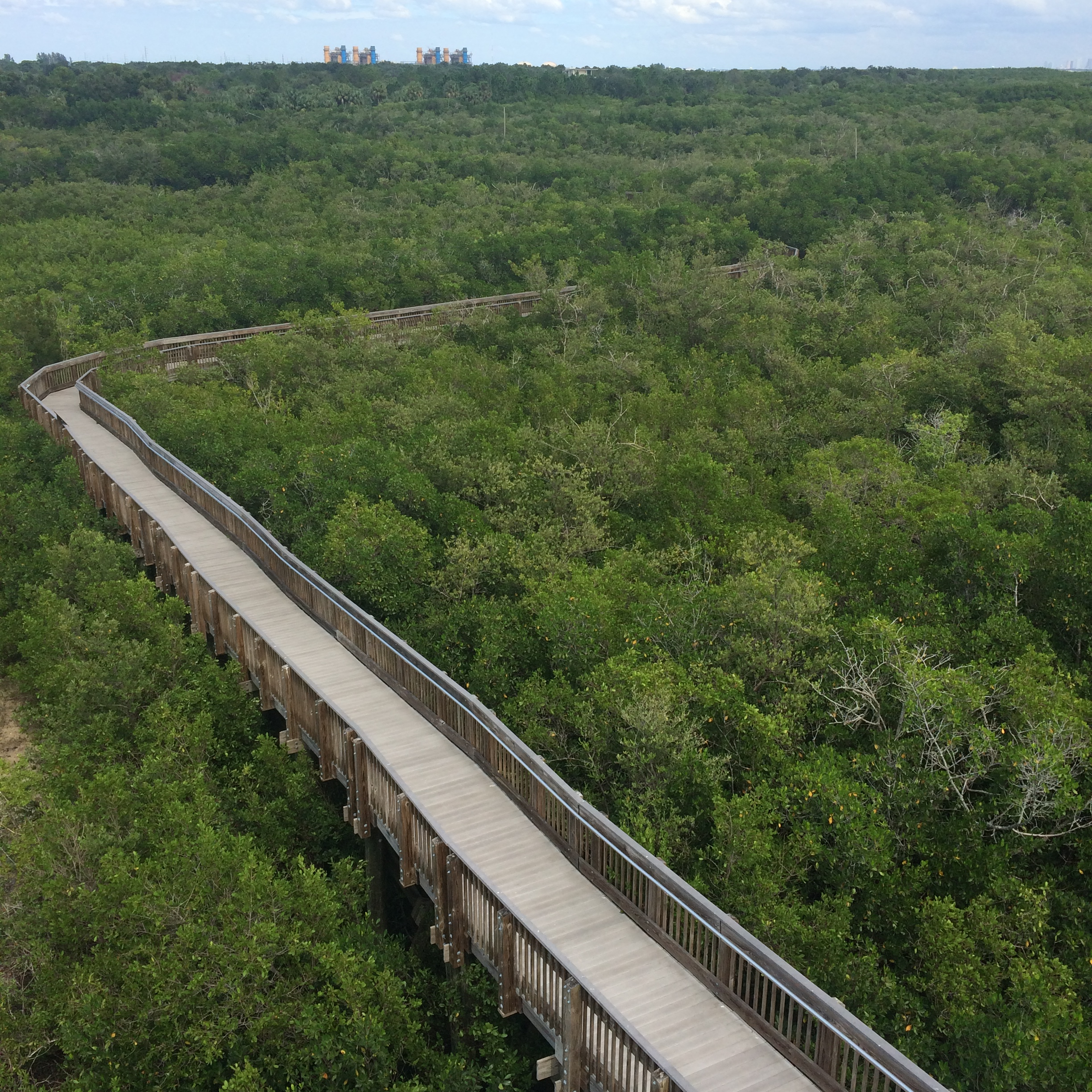
View of the boardwalk from the observation tower

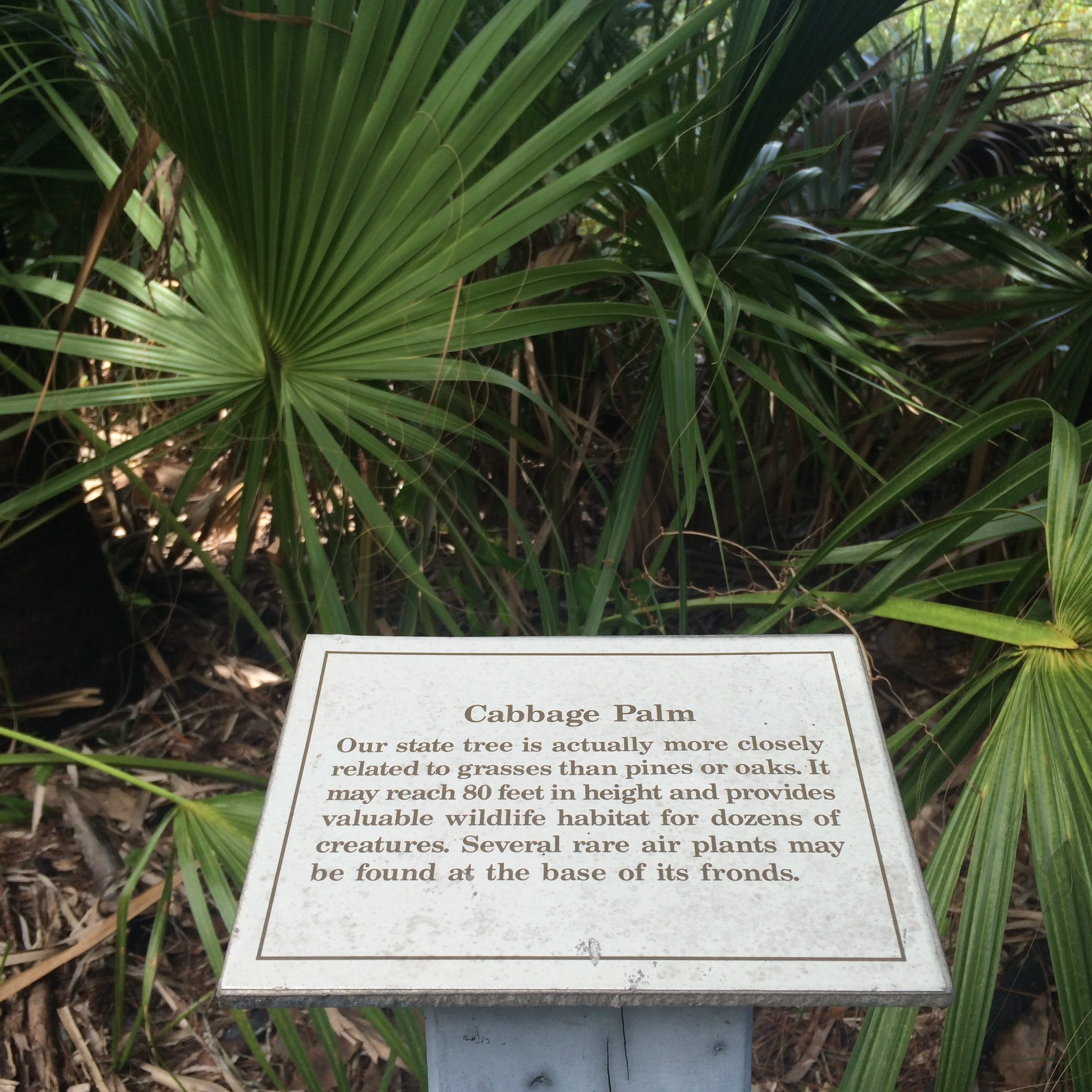
Cabbage palms, complete with some information about cabbage palms

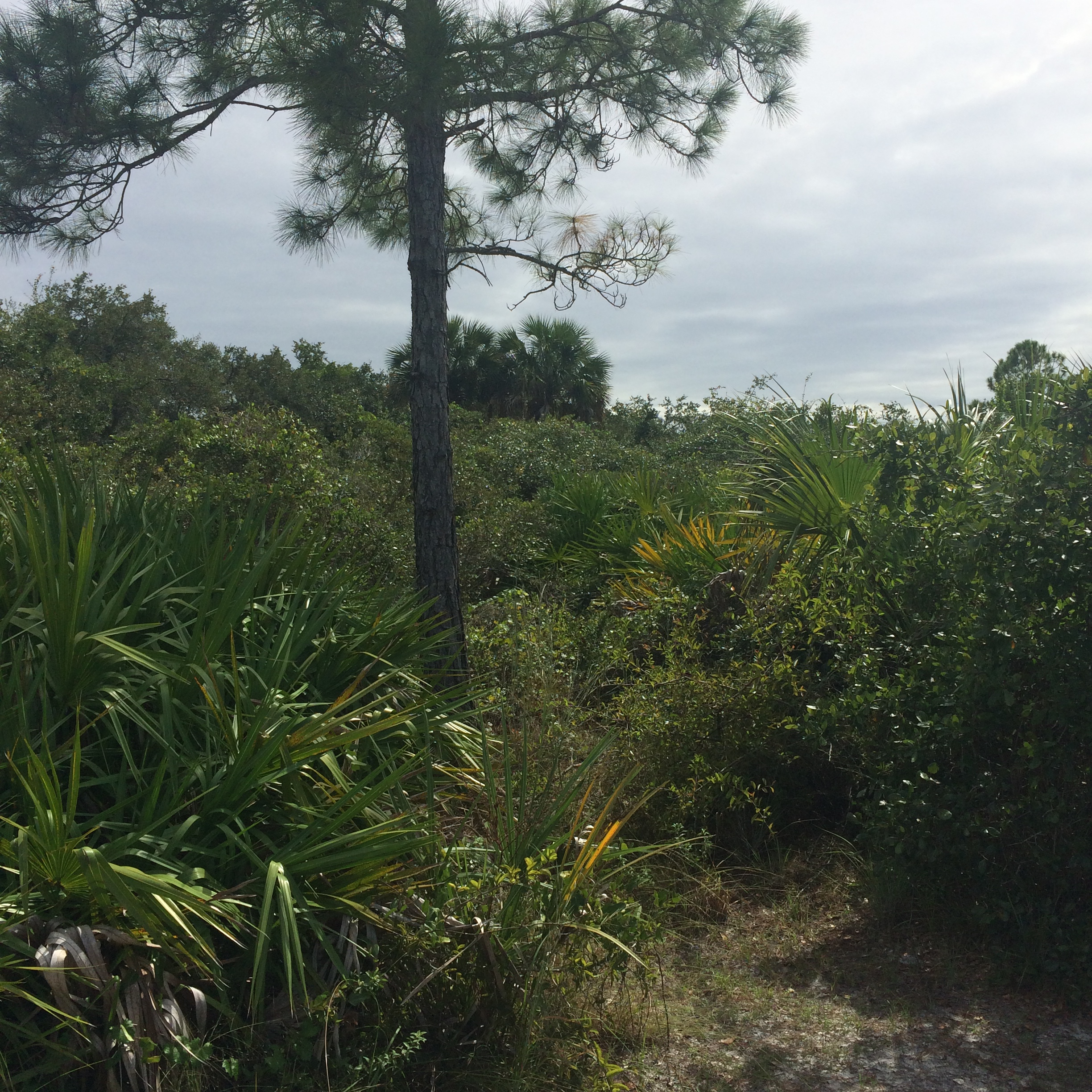
A view of pine flatwoods from the nature trail
