= Big Bend Coast =

Coastal area in Florida

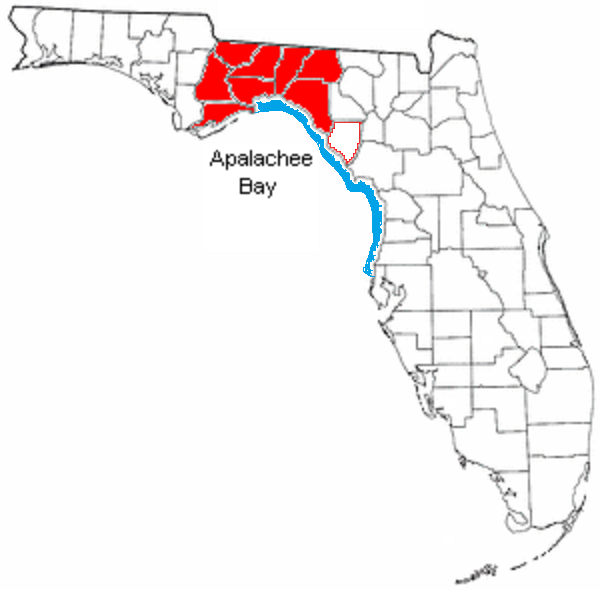
This map shows the Big Bend Coast of Florida in blue, and the Big Bend region in red.

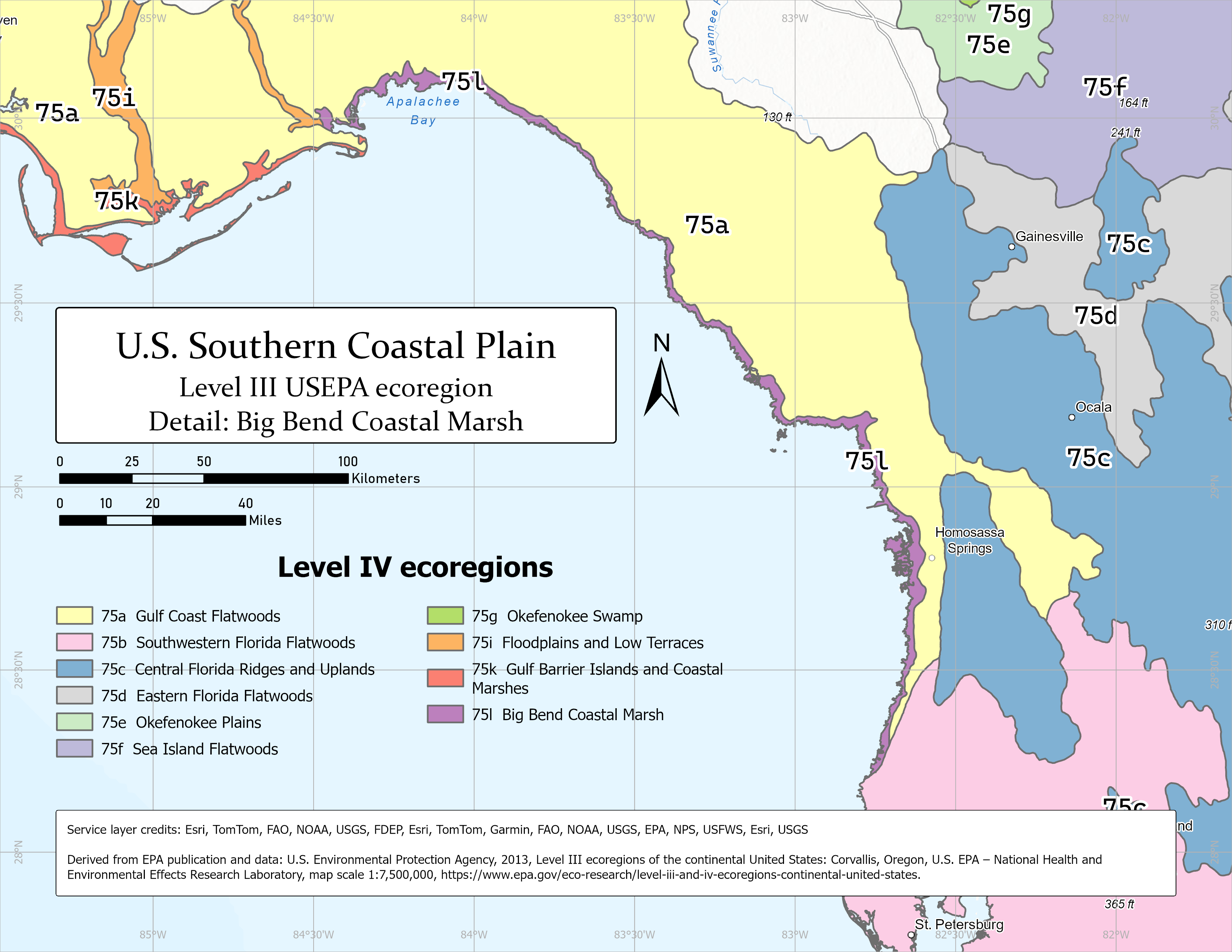
Detail of the Southern Coastal Plain ecoregion, centered on the Big Bend Coastal Marsh (purple)

The Big Bend Coast is the marshy coast extending about 350 kilometres (220 mi) from the western end of Apalachee Bay down the west coast of peninsular Florida to the Anclote River or Anclote Key. It partially overlaps the coast line of the Big Bend region of Florida, and is coterminous with the coast line of the Nature Coast region of Florida. Most of the coast remains undeveloped, with extensive salt marshes, mangrove forests, seagrass meadows, and oyster reefs offshore, and coastal hammocks onshore.

== Geography ==
The Big Bend Coast is variously defined as extending from the mouth of the Ochlockonee River, or of the St. Marks River, at the western end of Apalachee Bay, to the mouth of the Anclote River or to Anclote Key, just offshore of that river mouth. It is sometimes divided into two parts, the Big Bend Proper, from the Ochlockonee River to the Withlacoochee River, and the Springs Coast, from the Withlacoochee River to the Anclote River. The northern part of the coast, the Big Bend Proper, is sometimes further divided into four areas for study and discussion purposes: Apalachee Bay, Deadman's Bay (centered on the mouth of the Steinhatchee River), Suwannee Sound (centered on the mouth of the Suwannee River), and Wacasassa Bay. The Big Bend Coast is sometimes a component in the larger Wilderness Coast that also includes the coast west of Apalachee Bay to Cape San Blas. The Big Bend Proper includes the coasts of Wakulla, Jefferson, Taylor, Dixie, and Levy counties, while the Springs Coast includes the coasts of Citrus, Hernando and Pasco counties.

== Geology ==
The Big Bend Coast is a drowned karst region, covered with salt marsh and mangrove forests. It includes freshwater springs, oyster reefs, and the delta of the Suwannee River. There are barrier islands west of the Ocklockonee River and south starting with Anclote Key, but there are no barrier islands between those places. The Big Bend Coast has little or no sand or mud. The karst topography has produced an irregular, frequently exposed, bedrock surface. The lack of sand has been a feature of the Big Bend Coast since at least the Pleistocene. Sediment of Holocene origin is generally limited to salt marshes and the nearshore zone, and is redistributed by tidal action and storm events. The Suwannee River carries about 73,000 metric tons of sediment to the coast each year. The Big Bend Coast is on the Gulf Coastal Lowlands of Florida, which has recently exposed ocean-smoothed terraces with Tertiary limestone at or just below the surface. The flatness of the Big Bend Coast is interrupted by an area of relic sand dunes just inland from the Cedar Keys. The presence of a high water table has produced a karst landscape. The limestone hosts the Florida aquifer, which reaches the surface near the coast. Steady discharge from the aquifer supports the discharge of the many springs feeding rivers and streams along the coast and maintains a high water table near the coast.

== Freshwater sources ==
=== Rivers ===
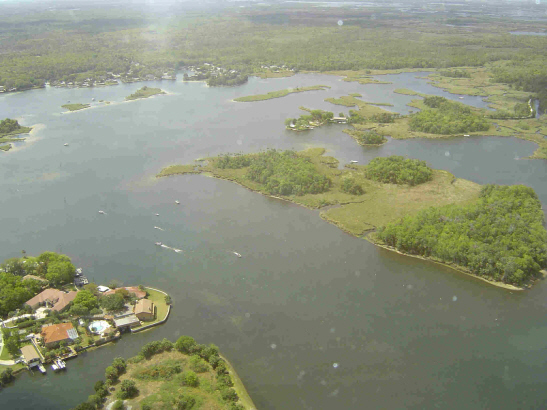
Kings Bay, fed by several major springs, is the head of the Crystal River.

All of the rivers that reach the Gulf of Mexico along the Big Bend Coast are at least partly spring-fed. There are 14 rivers (and many smaller streams) reaching the coast between the Ochlockonee River at the western end of the Big Bend Coast and the Anclote River at the southern end, including the St. Marks, Aucilla, Econfina, Fenholloway, Steinhatchee, Suwannee, Waccasassa, Withlacoochee, Crystal, Homosassa, Chassahowitzka, Weeki Wachee, and Pithlachascotee rivers, and Spring Warrior Creek. Largest is the Suwannee River, with a small delta near the middle of the coast. The coast between the Withlacoochee and Anclote rivers is known as the Springs Coast. Four short (4 to 12 km long) rivers, the Crystal, Homosassa, Chassahowitzka, and Weeki Wachee rivers, are fed almost entirely by first-magnitude springs, as there is almost no surface runoff in the area. The entire lengths of the Crystal, Homosassa and Chassahowitzka rivers are subject to tidal influence. At the southern end of the Springs Coast, the Pithlachascotee and Anclote rivers arise further inland, but are almost entirely spring-fed.

The many rivers and smaller streams flowing to the Big Bend Coast lower the salinity of the nearshore water. The seasonality of rainfall produces seasonal variations in the salinity of the waters along the Big Bend Proper (the rivers of the Springs Coast are almost completely fed by springs, and have little or no seasonal variation in flow). Rainfall from tropical cyclones may also lower the salinity of nearshore waters. The shallowness of nearshore waters also mean that the water temperature is strongly affected by the air temperature. Tropical species may be killed by cold weather, or may migrate southward or to deeper water less subject to cooling in winter.

=== Other freshwater sources ===
Besides rivers and streams, hundreds of springs (including submarine springs), fractures and seeps along the Big Bend Coast contribute to the flow of freshwater into the Gulf of Mexico. The close proximity of the Florida aquifer to the surface with only a shallow soil layer over the porous limestone bedrock means that groundwater can emerge in many locations. The water discharged by the Florida aquifer to the surface has a temperature of 70 to 72 °F (21 to 22 °C) year-round. On winter nights the waters of the Gulf are significantly cooler than the water emerging from the Florida aquifer. Thermal images were taken at night in March 2009 along 126 miles (203 km) of the Big Bend Coast from Jefferson County to Levy County. The thermal images revealed 874 "hot spots" along the coast which were at least 6 °F (3.3 °C) warmer than Gulf waters in the study area. One hundred ninety-three of the identified sources were under water in the Gulf. The authors estimated that the discharge from the identified inland sources is equivalent to that of one 1st-magnitude spring for every 2 miles (3.2 km) of coast.

The streams and springs flowing to the Big Bend Coast contribute approximately 1,000,000 US gallons (3,800,000 L; 830,000 imp gal) of freshwater to the Gulf of Mexico each day. Livingston describes the Big Bend Coast as a massive, open estuary.

== Intertidal zone ==
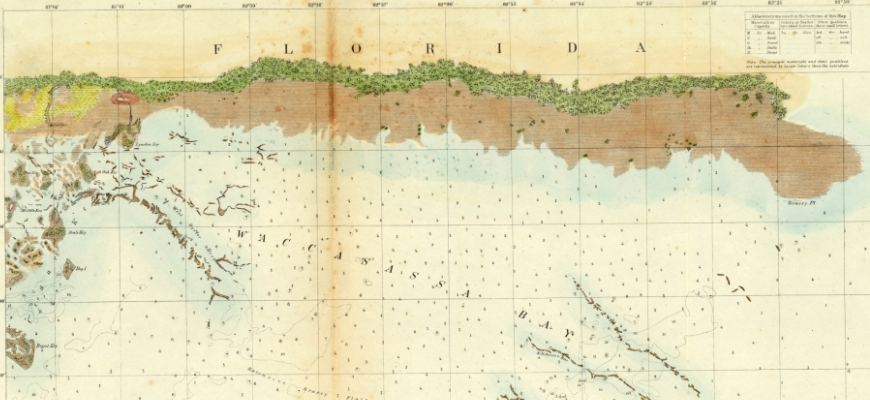
Salt marshes (in brown) of the coast between the Cedar Keys and the mouth of the Waccasassa River in 1856 (Detail of 1856 Waccasassa Bay Nautical Chart)

The Big Bend Coast is subject to little or no wave energy. Tidal range is 73 to 75 centimetres (29 to 30 in) for all of the Big Bend Coast. In the mid-20th century the intertidal zone of the Big Bend Coast consisted of salt marshes up to 10 kilometres (6 mi) wide, dominated by herbaceous (non-woody) plants, including Juncus roemerianus, Distichlis spicata, Sporobolus pumilus (formerly Spartina patens), and Salicornia species. There were about 650 square kilometres (250 sq mi) of tidal marsh along the Big Bend Coast in 1997. The marshes grow on sediment that is usually no more than 2 metres (6.6 ft) thick, although some depressions in the karst bedrock may have thicker deposits. As of 2023, mangrove forests are replacing salt marshes in the intertidal zone along the southern part of the Big Bend Coast from the Cedar Keys to Anclote Key. (Note: Two of the mangrove species that grow in Florida, the red mangrove (Rhizophora mangle) and the white mangrove (Laguncularia racemosa), do not grow north of Cedar Key. Black mangroves (Avicennia germinans) can regrow from roots after being killed back by a freeze, and are found by themselves a little further north.) Mussels, oysters, fiddler crabs, marsh periwinkles (the snail Littoraria irrorata), crown conch (Melongena corona), flathead grey mullet (Mugil cephalus), and blue crabs (Callinectes sapidus) are abundant in the salt marshes. The vegetation of the salt marshes have been called "perhaps the most productive in the world." Salinity levels and temperatures can seasonally become extreme in salt marshes, potentially killing many fish and invertebrates. Most species found in salt marshes have developed behavioral strategies, such as migration, to cope with the extremes. Marsh creeks carry freshwater runoff from the land to the gulf, and provide another habitat for many species. Glass shrimp and killifish are lifelong residents of marsh creeks. Pink shrimp, blue crabs, stone crabs, mullet, red drum, and Gulf flounder live in marsh creeks as juveniles. As a result of sea level rise, salt marshes have been retreating along the Big Bend Coast, but losses on the open water side have been more than offset by the replacement of coastal forest with new marshes, so that the area of salt marshes along the coast has increased by approximately 23% since the beginning of the 20th century.

== Oyster reefs ==
Although relatively rare, there are some outcroppings of limestone bedrock in the water along the coast. Oyster reefs are found on such outcroppings, particularly close to the intertidal zone in the nearshore zone. Oyster reefs often include mussels, slipper shells, and barnacles. Porcelain crabs, mud crabs, peppermint shrimp, snapping shrimp, annelid worms, gobies and toadfish commonly live in the crevices of oyster reefs. Oysters are preyed on by juvenile stone crabs, blue crabs, oyster drills, and crown conchs. Oyster reefs along the Big Bend Coast can be classified as "marsh-oyster", with oysters present as individuals or clumps in Sporobolus alterniflorus (cordgrass) on fine sediment, and "sand-oyster", with oysters found on coarse sand and shell fragments with little of no vegetation. Marsh-oyster reefs occur primarily close to shore. The more common sand-oyster reefs are found from close to shore to approximately 2 kilometres (1.2 mi) from the shoreline. Oyster reefs have been present in the area for 2,800 to 4,000 years.

A study of oyster reefs in the vicinity of the Suwannee River delta found that the area of reefs in the study area had decreased by 66% between 1982 and 2010. The area covered by the reefs declined from 1982 until 2001, but appeared to increase between 2001 and 2010. The study found that the apparent increase in area between 2001 and 2010 was an artifact of reef collapse, in which reefs with a high density of oysters spread over a wider area with a much lower density of live oysters. On average, both reef collapse and total loss of reefs were higher the further the reef was from shore. Some increase in oyster populations was found in 2010 in areas closest to the shore.

== Nearshore zone ==
The nearshore or littoral zone of the Big Bend Coast was estimated to have 3,000 square kilometres (1,200 sq mi) of seagrass meadows in 1999, consisting primarily of the seagrasses Thalassia testudinum (turtlegrass), Syringodium filiforme (manatee grass), and Halodule wrightii (shoal grass). The seagrasses Halophila engelmannii (star grass) and Halophila decipiens (Caribbean seagrass), and the salt-tolerant wetlands grass Ruppia maritima (ditch grass), are also found in the seagrass meadows. Green algae, primarily of the order Bryopsidales, but including some species in the order Dasycladales, are common, and a few brown algae, are either rooted to the floor of the littoral zones, or attached to seagrasses. Other algae, primarily red algae, but also including some green and brown algae species, drift in the waters around and above the seagrass meadows (many of the drift algae species start life as epiphytes on seagrass and rooted algae). In some areas algae outmasses the seagrass. Seagrass meadows stabilize the bottom and slow water flow, which lets suspended particles settle out of the water. This reduces the turbidity of the water, allowing light to penetrate deeper. As a result, the seagrass meadows along the Big Bend Coast extend up to 15 kilometres (8 nmi) offshore, in water up to 5 metres (16 ft) deep (seagrasses are usually restricted to waters 2 metres [7 ft] deep or less). The seagrass meadows of the Big Bend Coast are among the largest and least disturbed in the world.

The biological diversity found in seagrass meadows is surpassed only by coral reefs in Florida waters. Seagrass meadows host a wide variety of algae and animals. Red algae and filter-feeding animals, such as sea squirt colonies, sponges, pygmy sea cucumbers, and juvenile scallops, attach to the blades of seagrass, often remaining for rest of their lives. Invertebrates, including hermit crabs, stone crabs, various shrimp species, amphipods, isopods, brittle stars, asteroid starfish, sea cucumbers, pen shells, clams, scallops, sea snails, arrow shrimp (Tozeuma carolinense) and sea urchins live among the seagrasses. Some fish, such as spotted sea trout, seahorses, and pinfish live year-round in the seagrass. Other fish, such as black sea bass, gag grouper, and gray snapper shelter in the seagrass while juveniles. Atlantic Spanish mackerel, bluefish, crevalle jack, pigfish, and spot enter the seagrass meadows to forage.

The seagrasses of the Big Bend Coast are typically found in tropical waters, and are at or near the northern limit of their ranges. The lowest tides of the year generally occur in the winter, and expose the seagrasses to freezing air temperatures for significant periods on the coldest mornings. Such climate stress may reduce the ability of the seagrass to recover from the impacts of pollution and other disturbances caused by human activities. Seagrass coverage in the Big Bend Coast may be decreasing. One study estimated that 23 square kilometres (9 sq mi) of seagrass beds had been lost off the mouth of the Fenholloway River because of pollution from pulp mill discharge. Other areas, such as around the mouth of the Suwannee River, the southern end of Suwannee Sound near Cedar Key, and Wacassassa Bay, which were reported to have beds of seagrass in the past, do not have them today. Extensive seagrass beds around Anclote Key, at the southern end of the Big Bend Coast, disappeared in the early 1960s.

== Offshore waters ==
Water from the Caribbean Sea flows northward between Cuba and the Yucatán peninsula into the southeastern Gulf of Mexico. This current splits well south of the western end of the Florida Panhandle, with most of the water turning east and then south in the Gulf Loop Current, flowing along the west edge of the Florida Platform and through the Florida Straits to form the Gulf Stream. The West Florida Gyre rotates over the wide continental shelf between the Gulf Loop Current and the Florida peninsula, from the Big Bend Coast to below Tampa Bay.The West Florida Gyre carries larvae from fishes and invertebrates that spawn in the northern Gulf of Mexico close to Big Bend Coast, as well as tropical species.

== Coastal hammocks ==
The dry land along the Big Bend Coast is largely covered by forests known as coastal hammocks. The coastal hammocks are hydric, with the soil saturated for much of the year, and subject to occasional flooding. Coastal hydric hammocks are typically found on soils dominated by sand, loam, or muck, rather than alluvial soils. The hammocks require water with a high concentration of calcium and other minerals derived from limestone, either from limestone bedrock lying close to the surface, or from spring water that has flowed through limestone. The presence of a short hydroperiod (the length of time a habitat remains flooded), infrequent fires, slow accumulation of organic matter on the floor of the hammock, and deep groundwater contributing to flooding, have been given as characteristics of hydric hammocks. The soil in most coastal hammocks of the Big Bend Coast consists of thin layers (often less than 90 centimetres (35 in)) of sand and loamy sand, with limestone outcrops common. The soils are somewhat poorly drained, but do not have a hardpan. Hammock soils have a pH close to neutral, and often contain little organic content.

Hammocks occur along much of the Big Bend Coast, more or less continuously from St. Marks to south of the Fenholloway River. It is part of a series of hammocks, known as the Gulf Hammock Belt, or Gulf Coast Hammocks, found along the coast of Florida from St, Marks, in Wakulla County, to Aripeka, at the boundary between Hernando and Pasco counties. Hammocks are scattered along the coast from St. Marks to the Suwannee River. Another more or less continuous band of hammocks extends from Cedar Key through Gulf Hammock to the boundary between Hernando and Pasco counties. The coastal hammocks of the Big Bend Coast affect the flow of fresh water from upland sources to salt marshes and inshore waters of the coast. The fresh water reduces the salinity of near shore waters, establishing a gradient, progressively becoming more saline as it passes through the salt marshes and near shore zones. The fresh water also carries nutrients and particulates and sediments into the near shore waters. Seasonal changes in freshwater flow affects changes in the salt marshes and seagrass beds. Fresh water entering the salt marshes is important for oysters, as oysters grow best in waters that are less saline than the open ocean, while potential predators are also deterred by lower salinity.

Only plants that can tolerate saturated soils and occasional flooding are found in coastal hammocks, but that includes a variety of trees, the most common of which are American elm (Ulmus americana), American hornbeam (Carpinus caroliniana), American maple (Acer rubrum), eastern red cedar (Juniperus virginiana var. silicicola), laurel oak (Quercus laurifolia), loblolly pine (Pinus taeda), sabal palm, (Sabal palmetto), southern live oak (Quercus virginiana), sugarberry (Celtis laevigata), sweetbay (Magnolia virginiana), sweet gum (Liquidambar styraciflua), swamp bay (Persea palustris), and water oak (Quercus nigra). Common shrubs in the hammocks of the Big Bend Coast include dahoon holly (Ilex cassine), yaupon holly (Ilex vomitoria), and wax myrtle (Myrica cerifera). The hammocks of the Big Bend Coast, especially Gulf Hammock between the Suwannee and Withlachoochee rivers, have extensive herbaceous vegetation, including ferns, grass, sedges, and herbs. Close to the salt marshes the composition of the hammocks changes, with trees having less salt-tolerance disappearing. There is a zone in which southern live oak, eastern red cedar, and sabal palm are found, then closer to the Gulf, eastern red cedar and sabal palm, and closest to the salt marshes just sabal palm. Islands of hammock may occur on slight rises in salt marshes, while salt marshes may extend into hammocks along tidal creeks.

Comparison of Landsat images and ground-based photographs taken years apart document loss of trees in coastal hammocks, which has been particularly severe close to the boundary between hammocks and salt marshes. One study area of 540 square kilometres (210 sq mi) that included forest within 2 kilometres (1.2 mi) of the coast showed a loss of 126 square kilometres (49 sq mi) of hammock trees from 2003 to 2016. Another study found that 148 square kilometres (57 sq mi) of coastal hammock had been lost between 1875 and 1995. McCarthy, et al., state that the death of trees in coastal hammocks on the Big Bend Coast has accelerated since 2010. Mature trees typical of coastal hammocks may be found in transitional zones that have been invaded by salt marsh, but those trees are no longer regenerating.

Coastal hammocks in the Gulf Hammock region have been impacted by sea level rise much more than the rest of the Big Bend Coast. The boundary between the intertidal zone has migrated more than 1 kilometre (0.62 mi) inland. On the other hand, there has been little to no migration of the salt marsh-coastal hammock boundary along the tidal reaches of several spring-fed rivers, where a consistent year-round flow of fresh water may keep salinities low enough to protect the hammocks.

== Sea level rise ==
The sea level is rising faster at Cedar Key than at other locations around the Gulf of Mexico, with a 22% to 25% faster increase over the global average rate predicted by 2060. As of 1973, the rate of sea level rise was 25 centimetres (9.8 in) per century. The rate of sea level rise has been accelerating on the Big Bend Coast in recent years. The sea level rose at Cedar Key an average of 2.56 millimetres (0.10 in) per year for 1940 through 2016, but the rate was 10.2 millimetres (0.40 in) for 2000 to 2016, and 16.5 millimetres (0.65 in) for 2010 to 2016. The rise of the sea level at Cedar Key has not been linear. The 18.6 year long lunar node cycle interacts with an 11 to 14 year long sea-level cycle, producing pulses of rapid sea-level rise, followed by periods of steady sea levels or even some decrease. Records at Cedar Key since the installation of a tide gauge in 1914 show that the mean higher high water (and therefore, tidal range or amplitude) has been increasing twice as fast as the mean sea level.

A comparison of Landsat images and United States Coast and Geodetic Survey charts from between 1852 and 1886 showed a loss over 120 years of 43 square kilometres (17 sq mi) of salt marsh to open water along the shoreline with the Gulf of Mexico, while 82 square kilometres (32 sq mi) of coastal hammocks had been replaced by new salt marsh. Another 66 square kilometres (25 sq mi) of coastal hammocks have been converted to a transitional zone, in which some hammock trees survive, but new trees do not grow. This has resulted in a net gain of 39 square kilometres (15 sq mi) of salt marsh area, and, including the transitional zone, a net gain of 105 square kilometres (41 sq mi) in the area of the intertidal zone. The shoreline of the Big Bend Coast has been migrating inland an average of 120 metres (390 ft) per century, while the border between the intertidal zone and coastal hammocks has been migrating an average of 230 metres (750 ft) per century.

== History ==
=== Precolumbian history ===
Evidence of human presence in what is now the Big Bend Coast goes back more than 14,000 years, when Paleoindians butchered or scavenged mastodons at the Page-Ladson site on the Aucilla River. Evidence of Paleoindian presence has also been found at the Edward Ball Wakulla Springs State Park, on the Wakulla River, a tributary of the St. Marks River. The seacoast was up to 70 miles (113 km) away from Page-Ladson at the time than it is now, as the sea level was about 100 metres (328 ft) lower. Early sites in the area that have been inundated by rising sea levels include the Econfina Channel site and the J&J Hunt Submerged Archaeological Site, in Apalachee Bay. Surveys of the submerged bottom of Apalachee Bay, concentrating on the PaleoAucilla River channel (Note: The PaleoAucilla is a paleochannel extending from the mouth of the Aucilla River to the coastline as it existed during the Younger Dryas, when Paleo-Indians reached Florida. That shoreline was probably at about the 40 metres (130 ft) isobath, about 140 kilometres (76 nmi) from the current mouth of the Aucilla River. Part of the channel has been resolved to consist of a series of sinkholes and depressions. The PaleoAucilla channel curves around three sides of the J&J Hunt site. Other paleochannels identified in Apalachee Bay include the PaleoOchlocknee, PaleoSt.Marks, and PaleoEconofina.) have found 30 sites yielding pre-historic human artifacts. Sites with artifacts are in water up to 6 metres (20 ft) deep, and up to 15 kilometres (8.1 nmi) from shore. More recent mounds that were formerly on higher ground are now surrounded by water.

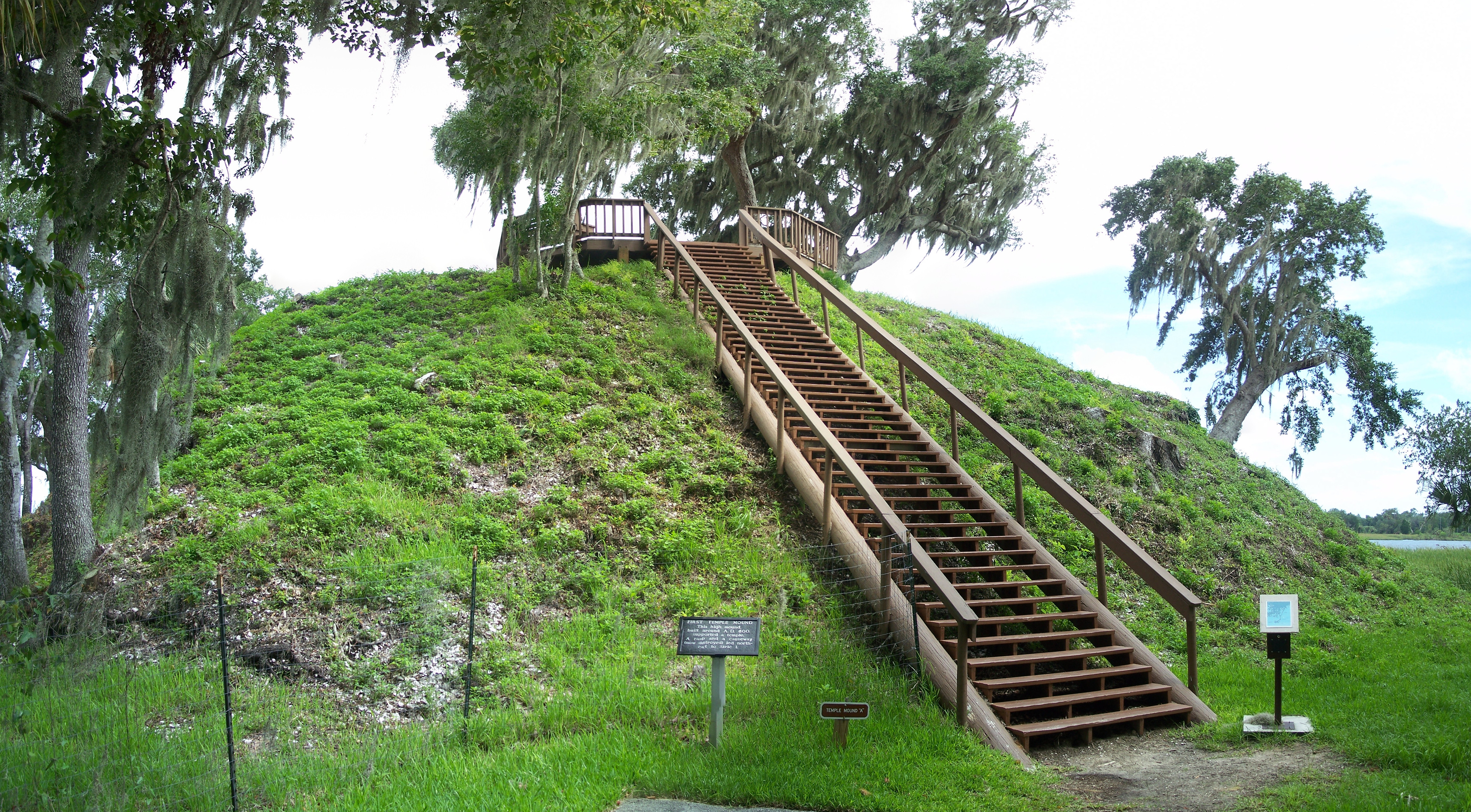
Mound at Crystal River Archaeological State Park

About 500 BCE, the Deptford archaeological culture spread along the Big Bend Coast. The Deptford culture was oriented to the coast, with major ceremonial sites, such as the Crystal River Archaeological State Park, on the Crystal River, the Garden Patch Archeological Site, near Horseshoe Beach, Florida, and Shell Mound, near Cedar Key located on the coast, and only minor, limited use sites inland. By about 100 CE, the north peninsular coast varieties of the Weeden Island culture replaced the Deptford culture along the Big Bend Coast east and south of the Aucilla River, while the Swift Creek culture became established west of the Aucilla. The northwest Florida variety of the Weeden Island culture in turn replaced the Swift Creek culture west of the Aucilla River around 300. The Bird Hammock site, near Wakulla Beach, Florida, was apparently a ceremonial center during the Swift Creek and Weeden Island periods.

The Fort Walton culture replaced Weeden Island in the area west of the Aucilla River around 900. At around the same time, the northern variety of the Safety Harbor culture appeared along the Big Bend Coast south of the mouth of the Withlacoochee River. The Roberts Island complex, on the Crystal River, appears to have replaced the Crystal River site as a ceremonial center in the Weeden Island and Safety Harbor periods. The Weeki Wachee Mound, at Weeki Wachee Springs, was another ceremonial center during the Safety Harbor period.

=== Spanish period ===
Spanish presence along the Big Bend Coast was limited. The Narváez expedition traveled close to the coast from Tampa Bay to the Withlacoochee River in 1528 without finding any signs of occupation. After crossing the Withlacoochee, the Spaniards encountered inhabitants of the area and thereafter travelled towards Apalachee Province, passing through lands with villages and agricultural fields. As they approached Apalachee Province the natives that had been pressed into service as guides apparently led the Spaniards through difficult country. The Spaniards gave up on travelling overland, and turning to the coast of Appalachee Bay, built rafts in which to sail west along the coast.

The Spanish introduced several animals, including hogs and cattle, soon after arriving in Florida. Hogs and cattle graze in the hammocks of the Big Bend Coast, affecting the composition of the hammocks. Hogs consume mast, interfering with establishment of seedlings, and disturb the soil by rooting. Cattle trample the soil and browse seedlings and other low growing plants.

== Populated places ==
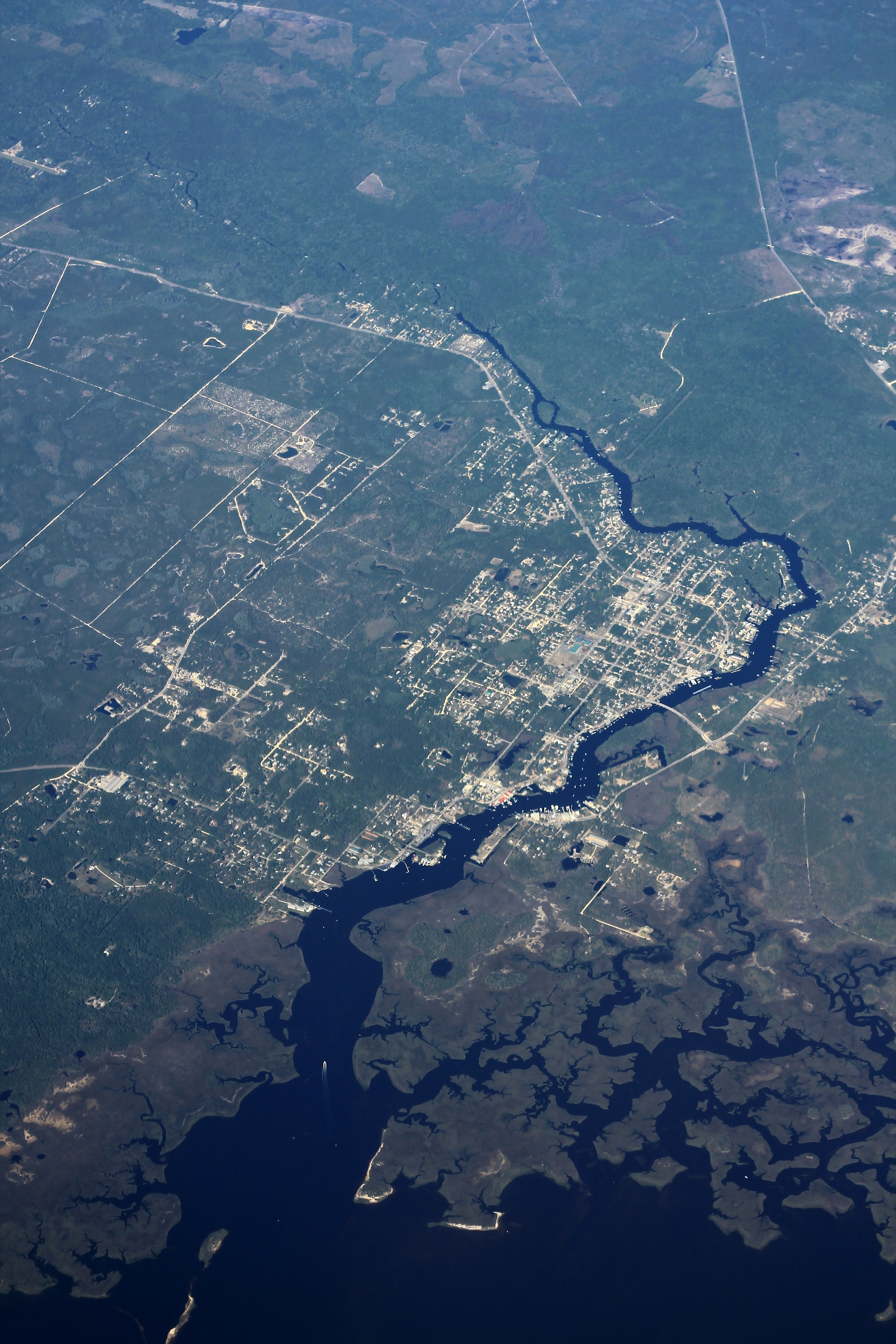
Aerial view of Steinhatchee, typical of populated places along the Big Bend Proper.

The Big Bend Proper (from the Ochlockonee River to the Withlacoochee River) is sparsely populated. Municipalities and census-designated places on the Big Bend Proper include (from north to south) St. Marks (population 274 in 2020), in Wakulla County, Steinhatchee (population 1,049 in 2020), in Taylor County, Horseshoe Beach (population 165 in 2020), in Dixie County, Cedar Key (population 687 in 2020), in Levy County, and Inglis (population 1,476 in 2020) and Yankeetown (population 588 in 2020) in Levy County.

The southern part of the Big Bend Coast, the Springs Coast, is more densely populated. Municipalities and census-designated places on or close to the Springs Coast include:

Populated place	County	2020 population
Aripeka	Pasco	320
Bayonet Point	Pasco	26,713
Bayport	Hernando	45
Beacon Square	Pasco	8,320
Crystal River	Citrus	3,396
Elfers	Pasco	14,573
Hernando Beach	Hernando	2,452
Heritage Pines	Pasco	2,136
High Point	Hernando	3,873
Holiday	Pasco	24,939
Homosassa	Citrus	2,299
Homosassa Springs	Citrus	14,283
Hudson	Pasco	12,944
Jasmine Estates	Pasco	21,525
Key Vista	Pasco	1,757
Meadow Oaks	Pasco	2,848
New Port Richey	Pasco	16,728
New Port Richey East	Pasco	11,015
North Weeki Wachee	Hernando	9,131
Odessa	Pasco	8,080
Pine Island	Hernando	62
Port Richey	Pasco	3,052
Spring Hill	Hernando	113,568
Timber Pines	Hernando	5,163
Trinity	Pasco	11,924
Weeki Wachee Gardens	Hernando	1,138

== Storm surges ==
Due to the width of the adjacent continental shelf (over 150 kilometres (81 nmi)), low gradient slope of the coast (1:5000), and shelter from the usual wind direction of storms, the Big Bend Coast is generally subject to low wave energy, but is subject to storm surges from hurricanes and other storms. Because of the great width and low slope of the continental shelf along the Big Bend Coast, storm surges are greater in height than those that occur on narrower and steeper continental shelves.

Storm surges that are known to have occurred along the Big Bend Coast include:

- 1837 - A hurricane produced a 6-foot (1.8 m) storm surge at St. Marks on August 7.
- 1842 - The Gulf to Bermuda Hurricane of 1842 struck St. Marks as a major hurricane on October 5, producing a reported 20-foot (6.1 m) storm surge at Cedar Key. (Note: A tide gauge was first established at Cedar Key in 1914. Reported storm surge heights prior to that year are not official.)
- 1843 - The Port Leon Florida Hurricane of 1843 produced a storm surge at Port Leon on September 14 that killed 14 people and destroyed the town, which was then abandoned.
- 1851 - The Great Middle-Florida Hurricane made landfall at Cape San Blas on August 23, producing a reported 12-foot (3.7 m) storm surge at St. Marks.
- 1852 - A hurricane made landfall east of Apalachicola on October 9, producing a reported 7-foot (2.1 m) storm surge at Newport.
- 1863 - Hurricane "Amanda" made landfall west of Apalachicola on May 28, producing a storm surge at St. Marks that destroyed a saltworks, damaged the railroad line several miles inland, and killed a reported 40 people and 48 mules and oxen.
- 1896 - The 1896 Cedar Keys hurricane made landfall at Cedar Key on September 29 with a 10-foot (3.0 m) storm surge. Most of the buildings on Atsena Otie Key were destroyed, and most of the residents moved to Way Key, which is now named Cedar Key.
- 1935 - The 1935 Labor Day hurricane made a second landfall near Cedar Key on September 4, with tides running "well above normal" all along the coast south of Cedar Key.
- 1966 - Hurricane Alma made landfall at the west end of Apalachee Bay on June 9, producing a storm surge of 4 to 10 feet (1.2 to 3.0 m) along the Big Bend Coast.
- 1968 - Hurricane Gladys made landfall near Homosassa on October 19, with a 6.5-foot (2.0 m) storm surge.
- 1985 - While Hurricane Elena did not make landfall in Florida, it approached Cedar Key closely enough that high water washed out a bridge and part of Florida State Road 24, the only highway connecting the town to inland Florida.

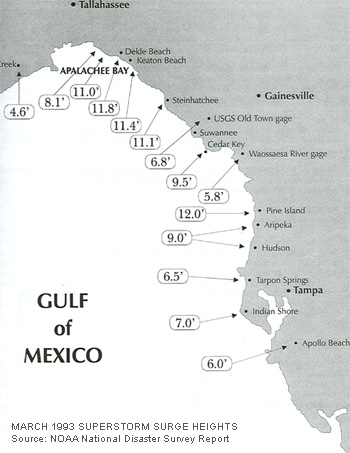
Storm surge heights for the No Name Storm of 1993

- 1993 - The No Name Storm of 1993 produced storm surges of 6 to 12 feet (1.8 to 3.7 m) along all of the Big Bend Coast.
- 1995 - Hurricane Allison made landfall near Alligator Point on June 5, producing storm surges of 6 to 8 feet (1.8 to 2.4 m) along the coasts of Wakulla and Dixie counties.
- 1998 - Hurricane Earl made landfall near Panama City, Florida on September 3. Surges caused by the storm were highest along the Big Bend Coast, up to 8 feet (2.4 m) on the coasts of Wakulla, Jefferson, and Taylor counties.
- 2016 - Hurricane Hermine made landfall east of St. Marks on September 2, producing a 5.8 feet (1.8 m) storm surge at Cedar Key.
- 2023 - Hurricane Idalia made landfall at Keaton Beach, producing a 8.9 feet (2.7 m) storm surge at Cedar Key.
- 2024 - Hurricane Helene made landfall 10 miles west-southwest of Perry, Florida, with preliminary storm surges estimated to be 9 feet at Cedar Key.

== Protected areas ==
Almost all of the coastal wetlands of the Big Bend Coast are protected. Protected wetland areas include:

- Big Bend Aquatic Seagrasses Preserve
- Big Bend Wildlife Management Area
- Cedar Key Scrub State Reserve
- Crystal River Preserve State Park
- Econfina River State Park
- Lower Suwannee National Wildlife Refuge
- Marjorie Harris Carr Cross Florida Greenway
- St. Marks National Wildlife Refuge
- St. Martins Marsh Aquatic Preserve
- Waccasassa Bay Preserve State Park
- Werner-Boyce Salt Springs State Park
- Weekiwachee Preserve

== Paddling trails ==
- Big Bend Saltwater Paddling Trail
- The Florida Circumnavigational Paddling Trail runs through the length of the Big Bend Coast.

- Segment Five (Crooked River/St. Marks Refuge)
- Segment Six (Big Bend)
- Segment Six (Nature Coast)

== Sources ==
- Barnes, Jay (1998). Florida's Hurricane History. Chapel Hill, North Carolina: The University of North Carolina Press. ISBN 978-0-8078-4748-0.
- Davis, Richard A. Jr. (1997). "Geology of the Florida Coast". In Randazzo, Anthony F.; Jones, Douglas S. (eds.). The Geology of Florida. Gainesville, Florida: University Press of Florida. ISBN 0-8130-1496-4.
- Davis, Richard A. Jr. (2016). Barrier Islands of the Florida Gulf Coast Peninsula. Sarasota, Florida: Pineapple Press. ISBN 978-1-56164-8085.
- Faught, Michael K. (January 2004). "Submerged Paleoindian and Archaic Sites of the Big Bend, Florida". Journal of Field Archaeology. 29 (3–4): 273–290. doi:10.1179/jfa.2004.29.3-4.273. ISSN 0093-4690.
- Hernnkind, William F. (March 2013). Sea Life of the Wilderness Coast (PDF) (Report). Tallahassee, Florida: The Florida State University Coastal & Marine Laboratory.
- Livingston, Robert J. (1990). "Inshore Marine Habitats". In Myers, Ronald L.; Ewel, John J. (eds.). Ecosystems of Florida. Orlando, Florida: University of Central Florida Press. pp. 549–573. ISBN 0-8130-1022-5.
- Mattson, Robert A. (1999). "Seagrass Ecosystem Characteristics, Research, and Management Needs in the Florida Big Bend". In Bortone, Stephen R. (ed.). Seagrasses: Monitoring, Ecology, Physiology, and Management. CRC Press. ISBN 978-1-4200-7447-5.
- Mattson, Robert A.; Frazer, Thomas K.; Hale, Jason; Blitch, Seth; Ahijevych, Lisa (2007). "Florida Big Bend" ( (PDF)). In Handley, L.; Altsman, D.; DeMay, R. (eds.). Seagrass Status and Trends in the Northern Gulf of Mexico: 1940–2002. United States Geological Survey. Archived from the original on July 9, 2023.
- McCarthy, Matthew J.; Dimmitt, Benjamin; DiGeronimo, Sebastian; Muller-Karger, Frank E. (2022-05-01). "Forest Loss is Accelerating Along the US Gulf Coast". Estuaries and Coasts. 45 (3): 913–919. doi:10.1007/s12237-021-01000-6. ISSN 1559-2731. PMC 8940792. PMID 35401066.
- Milanich, Jerald T. (1994). Archaeology of Precolumbian Florida. Gainesville, Florida: University Press of Florida. ISBN 0-8130-1273-2.
- Milanich, Jerald T. (1998) [1995]. Florida Indians and the Invasion from Europe (First paperback ed.). Gainesville, Florida: University Press of Florida. ISBN 978-0-8130-1636-8.
- Montague, Clay L.; Wiegert, Richard G. (1990). "Salt Marshes". In Myers, Ronald L.; Ewel, John J. (eds.). Ecosystems of Florida. Orlando, Florida: University of Central Florida Press. ISBN 0-8130-1022-5.
- Myers, Ronald L.; Ewel, John J. (1990). "Problems, Prospects, and Strategies for Protection". In Myers, Ronald L.; Ewel, John J. (eds.). Ecosystems of Florida. Orlando, Florida: University of Central Florida Press. ISBN 0-8130-1022-5.
- Sellards, E. H. (1913). Florida Geological Survey, Fifth Annual Report. Tallahassee: The State Geological Survey.
- Raabe, Ellen; Stonehouse, David; Ebersol, Kristin; Holland, Kathryn (September 2011). "Detection of Coastal and Submarine Discharge on the Florida Gulf Coast with an Airborne Thermal-Infrared Mapping System". The Professional Geologist. 48: 42-49 – via ResearchGate.
- Raabe, Ellen; Stumpf, Richard P. (5 May 2015). "Expansion of Tidal Marsh in Response to Sea-Level Rise: Gulf Coast of Florida, USA". Estuaries and Coasts. 39: 145–157. doi:10.1007/s12237-015-9974-y.
- Seavey, J. R.; Pine, W. E.; Frederick, P.; Sturmer, L.; Berrigan, M. (October 2011). "Decadal changes in oyster reefs in the Big Bend of Florida's Gulf Coast". Ecosphere. 2 (10): art114. doi:10.1890/ES11-00205.1. ISSN 2150-8925.
- Stallings, Christopher D.; Mickle, Alexandra; Nelson, James A.; McManus, Michael G.; Koenig, Christopher C. (2015). "Faunal communities and habitat characteristics of the Big Bend seagrass meadows, 2009–2010" (PDF). Ecology. 96 (1): 304–313. doi:10.1890/14-1345.1.
- Vince, Susan W.; Humphrey, Stephen R.; Simons, Robert W. (September 1989). "The ecology of hydric hammocks: a community profile" (PDF). U.S. Geological Service. Biological Report: 85(7.26). United States Fish and Wildlife Service. Archived from the original (PDF) on December 15, 2018.
- Williams, Kimberlyn; MacDonald, Michelina; McPherson, Kelly; Mirti, Thomas H. (2007). "Ecology of the Coastal Edge of Hydric Hammocks on the Gulf Coast of Florida". In Conner, William H.; Doyle, Thomas W.; Krauss, Ken W. (eds.). Ecology of Tidal Freshwater Forested Wetlands of the Southeastern United States. Dordrecht: Springer Netherlands. pp. 255–289. doi:10.1007/978-1-4020-5095-4_10. ISBN 978-1-4020-5095-4.
