= Florida's 12th congressional district =

U.S. House district for Florida

Coordinates: 28°16′07″N 82°29′30″W

- Map of district boundaries
- Representative: Gus Bilirakis; R–Palm Harbor
- Area: 1,069 mi^{2} (2,770 km^{2})
- Distribution: 93.09% urban; 6.91% rural
- Population (2025): 878,502
- Median household income: $72,410
- Ethnicity: 75.3% White; 13.6% Hispanic; 4.4% Black; 4.1% Two or more races; 2.0% Asian; 0.7% other
- Cook PVI: R+7

Florida's 12th congressional district is an electoral district for the U.S. Congress and was assigned along the Gulf coast of central Florida. The district includes Citrus County and Hernando County, as well as most of Pasco County, including the places of New Port Richey, Dade City, Spring Hill, and Homosassa Springs.

From 2013 to 2023, it covered Pasco County and parts of north Pinellas County and Hillsborough County.

The district is currently represented by Republican Gus Bilirakis.

== Composition ==
For the 118th and successive Congresses (based on redistricting following the 2020 census), the district contains all or portions of the following counties and communities:

Citrus County (15)

All 15 communities

Hernando County (22)

All 22 communities

Pasco County (29)

Aripeka, Bayonet Point, Beacon Square, Connerton, Dade City, Dade City North, Elfers, Heritage Pines, Holiday, Hudson, Jasmine Estates, Key Vista, Lacoochee, Land O' Lakes (part; also 15th), Meadow Oaks, Moon Lake, New Port Richey, New Port Richey East, Odessa (part; also 15th), Pasadena Hills (part; also 15th), Port Richey, Quail Ridge, River Ridge, San Antonio, Shady Hills, St. Leo, Trilby, Trinity, Wesley Chapel (part; also 15th),

== List of members representing the district ==
Member	Party	Years	Cong ress	Electoral history	Location
District created January 3, 1963
William C. Cramer (St. Petersburg)	Republican	January 3, 1963 – January 3, 1967	88th 89th	Redistricted from the 1st district and re-elected in 1962. Re-elected in 1964. Redistricted to the 8th district.	1963–1967 [data missing]
Dante Fascell (Miami)	Democratic	January 3, 1967 – January 3, 1973	90th 91st 92nd	Redistricted from the 4th district and re-elected in 1966. Re-elected in 1968. Re-elected in 1970. Redistricted to the 15th district.	1967–1973 [data missing]
J. Herbert Burke (Hollywood)	Republican	January 3, 1973 – January 3, 1979	93rd 94th 95th	Redistricted from the 10th district and re-elected in 1972. Re-elected in 1974. Re-elected in 1976. Lost re-election.	1973–1983 [data missing]
Edward J. Stack (Fort Lauderdale)	Democratic	January 3, 1979 – January 3, 1981	96th	Elected in 1978. Lost renomination.	1973–1983 [data missing]
Clay Shaw (Fort Lauderdale)	Republican	January 3, 1981 – January 3, 1983	97th	Elected in 1980. Redistricted to the 15th district.	1973–1983 [data missing]
Tom Lewis (North Palm Beach)	Republican	January 3, 1983 – January 3, 1993	98th 99th 100th 101st 102nd	Elected in 1982. Re-elected in 1984. Re-elected in 1986. Re-elected in 1988. Re-elected in 1990. Redistricted to the 16th district.	1983–1993 [data missing]
Charles T. Canady (Lakeland)	Republican	January 3, 1993 – January 3, 2001	103rd 104th 105th 106th	Elected in 1992. Re-elected in 1994. Re-elected in 1996. Re-elected in 1998. Retired.	1993–2003 [data missing]
Adam Putnam (Bartow)	Republican	January 3, 2001 – January 3, 2011	107th 108th 109th 110th 111th	Elected in 2000. Re-elected in 2002. Re-elected in 2004. Re-elected in 2006. Re-elected in 2008. Retired to run for Florida Commissioner of Agriculture and Consumer Services.	1993–2003 [data missing]
Adam Putnam (Bartow)	Republican	January 3, 2001 – January 3, 2011	107th 108th 109th 110th 111th	Elected in 2000. Re-elected in 2002. Re-elected in 2004. Re-elected in 2006. Re-elected in 2008. Retired to run for Florida Commissioner of Agriculture and Consumer Services.	2003–2013; The district covered areas further east and encompassed much of Polk County as well as parts of rural and suburban east Hillsborough County and a small piece of western Osceola County, which later became the center of the 9th district.
Dennis Ross (Lakeland)	Republican	January 3, 2011 – January 3, 2013	112th	Elected in 2010. Redistricted to the 15th district.	2003–2013; The district covered areas further east and encompassed much of Polk County as well as parts of rural and suburban east Hillsborough County and a small piece of western Osceola County, which later became the center of the 9th district.
Gus Bilirakis (Palm Harbor)	Republican	January 3, 2013 – present	113th 114th 115th 116th 117th 118th 119th	Redistricted from the 9th district and re-elected in 2012. Re-elected in 2014. Re-elected in 2016. Re-elected in 2018. Re-elected in 2020. Re-elected in 2022. Re-elected in 2024. Re-elected in 2026.	2013–2017
Gus Bilirakis (Palm Harbor)	Republican	January 3, 2013 – present	113th 114th 115th 116th 117th 118th 119th	Redistricted from the 9th district and re-elected in 2012. Re-elected in 2014. Re-elected in 2016. Re-elected in 2018. Re-elected in 2020. Re-elected in 2022. Re-elected in 2024. Re-elected in 2026.	2017–2023
Gus Bilirakis (Palm Harbor)	Republican	January 3, 2013 – present	113th 114th 115th 116th 117th 118th 119th	Redistricted from the 9th district and re-elected in 2012. Re-elected in 2014. Re-elected in 2016. Re-elected in 2018. Re-elected in 2020. Re-elected in 2022. Re-elected in 2024. Re-elected in 2026.	2023–2027

== Recent election results from statewide races ==
Year	Office	Results
2008	President	McCain 52% - 46%
2010	Senate	Rubio 47% - 12%
2010	Governor	Scott 55% - 45%
2010	Attorney General	Bondi 58% - 34%
2010	Chief Financial Officer	Atwater 59% - 31%
2012	President	Romney 55% - 45%
2012	Senate	Nelson 55% - 45%
2014	Governor	Scott 52% - 48%
2016	President	Trump 62% - 34%
2016	Senate	Rubio 58% - 35%
2018	Senate	Scott 61% - 38%
2018	Governor	DeSantis 61% - 37%
2018	Attorney General	Moody 65% - 33%
2018	Chief Financial Officer	Patronis 64% - 36%
2020	President	Trump 64% - 35%
2022	Senate	Rubio 68% - 31%
2022	Governor	DeSantis 69% - 30%
2022	Attorney General	Moody 72% - 28%
2022	Chief Financial Officer	Patronis 70% - 30%
2024	President	Trump 67% - 32%
2024	Senate	Scott 64% - 34%

== Recent election results ==
=== 2002 ===
Florida's 12th Congressional District Election (2002)
Party	Candidate	Votes	%
Republican	Adam Putnam (Incumbent)		100.00
Total votes			100.00
Turnout			
Republican hold			

=== 2004 ===
Florida's 12th Congressional District Election (2004)
Party	Candidate	Votes	%
Republican	Adam Putnam (Incumbent)	179,204	64.89
Democratic	Bob Hagenmaier	96,965	35.11
Total votes		276,169	100.00
Turnout			
Republican hold			

=== 2006 ===
Florida's 12th Congressional District Election (2006)
Party	Candidate	Votes	%
Republican	Adam Putnam (Incumbent)	124,452	69.12
Independent	Joe Viscusi	34,976	19.42
Independent	Ed Bowlin	20,636	11.46
Total votes		180,064	100.00
Turnout			
Republican hold			

=== 2008 ===
Florida's 12th Congressional District Election (2008)
Party	Candidate	Votes	%
Republican	Adam Putnam (Incumbent)	185,698	57.46
Democratic	Doug Tudor	137,465	42.54
Total votes		323,163	100.00
Turnout			
Republican hold			

=== 2010 ===
Florida's 12th Congressional District Election (2010)
Party	Candidate	Votes	%
Republican	Dennis Ross (Incumbent)	102,704	48.14
Democratic	Lori Edwards	87,769	41.14
Independent	Randy Wilkinson (Note: Randy Wilkinson ran on the Tea Party platform on the ballot.)	22,857	10.71
Total votes		213,330	100.00
Turnout			
Republican hold			

=== 2012 ===
2012 United States House of Representatives elections in Florida
Party	Candidate	Votes	%
Republican	Gus Bilirakis (incumbent)	209,604	63.5
Democratic	Jonathan Michael Snow	108,770	32.9
Independent	John Russell	6,878	2.1
Independent	Paul Siney Elliott	4,915	1.5
Total votes		330,167	100.0
Republican hold			

=== 2014 ===
Bilirakis ran uncontested.

=== 2016 ===
Florida's 12th congressional district, 2016
Party	Candidate	Votes	%
Republican	Gus Bilirakis (incumbent)	253,559	68.6
Democratic	Robert Matthew Tager	116,110	31.4
Total votes		369,669	100.0
Republican hold			

=== 2018 ===
Florida's 12th congressional district, 2018
Party	Candidate	Votes	%
Republican	Gus Bilirakis (incumbent)	194,564	58.1
Democratic	Chris Hunter	132,844	39.7
Independent	Angelika Purkis	7,510	2.2
Total votes		334,918	100.0
Republican hold			

=== 2020 ===
Florida's 12th congressional district, 2020
Party	Candidate	Votes	%
Republican	Gus Bilirakis (incumbent)	284,941	62.9
Democratic	Kimberly Walker	168,194	37.1
Total votes		453,135	100.0
Republican hold			

=== 2022 ===
Florida's 12th congressional district, 2022
Party	Candidate	Votes	%
Republican	Gus Bilirakis (incumbent)	226,583	70.38
Democratic	Kimberly Walker	95,377	29.62
Independent	Charles Smith (write-in)	4	<0.01
Total votes		321,964	100.0
Republican hold			

=== 2024 ===
Florida's 12th congressional district, 2024
Party	Candidate	Votes	%
Republican	Gus Bilirakis (incumbent)	306,487	71.04
Democratic	Rock Aboujaoude Jr.	125,949	28.96
Total votes		431.436	100.0
Republican hold			
