= List of places in Florida: I-K =

This list of current cities, towns, unincorporated communities, counties, and other recognized places in the U.S. state of Florida also includes information on the number and names of counties in which the place lies, and its lower and upper zip code bounds, if applicable.

Name of place	Number of counties	Counties	Lower zip code	Upper zip code
Iamonia	1	Leon		
Iddo	1	Taylor	32331	
Idylwild	1	Alachua	32601	
Ilexhurst	1	Manatee	34217	
Immokalee	1	Collier	33934	
Immokalee Indian Reservation	1	Collier		
Imperial Estates	1	Orange	32809	
Imperial Point	1	Broward		
Imroc	1	Polk		
Independent	1	Polk		
Indialantic	1	Brevard	32903	
Indian Beach	1	Sarasota		
Indian Creek	1	Miami-Dade	33139	
Indian Creek Village	1	Miami-Dade		
Indian Ford	1	Santa Rosa		
Indian Harbour Beach	1	Brevard	32937	
Indian Head Acres	1	Leon		
Indian Hills	1	Brevard	32922	
Indian Key	1	Monroe		
Indian Lake Estates	1	Polk	33855	
Indian Mound Village	1	Seminole		
Indianola	1	Brevard	32952	
Indian Pass	1	Gulf	32456	
Indian River City	1	Brevard	32780	
Indian River Estates	1	St. Lucie		
Indian River Shores	1	Indian River	32963	
Indian Rocks Beach	1	Pinellas	34635	
Indian Rocks Beach, South Shore	1	Pinellas		
Indian Shores	1	Pinellas	34635	
Indian Spring	1	Palm Beach		
Indiantown	1	Martin	34956	
Indian Trail Improvement District	1	Palm Beach		
Indrio	1	St. Lucie	33450	
Indrio-Saint Lucie	1	St. Lucie	33450	
Ingle	1	Nassau		
Inglis	1	Levy	34449	
Inlet Beach	1	Walton	32461	
Inlikita	1	Miami-Dade		
Innerarity Point	1	Escambia	32507	
Innisbrook	1	Pinellas		
Interbay	1	Hillsborough	33611	
Intercession City	1	Osceola	33848	
Interlachen	1	Putnam	32148	
Inverness	1	Citrus	34450	53
Inverness Highlands North	1	Citrus		
Inverness Highlands South	1	Citrus		
Inverrary	1	Broward	33313	
Inwood	1	Jackson		
Inwood	1	Polk	33880	
Iola	1	Gulf		
Iona	1	Lee		
Iona Gardens	1	Lee	33901	
Ipco	1	Levy		
Ipsco	1	Escambia		
Irvine	1	Marion	32686	
Islamorada	1	Monroe	33036	
Island Estates	1	Pinellas	33515	
Island Grove	1	Alachua	32654	
Islandia	1	Miami-Dade	33131	
Island Walk	1	Collier		
Isleboro	1	Volusia	32069	
Isle of Normandy	1	Miami-Dade		
Isle of Palms	1	Duval	32216	
Isle of Palms South	1	Duval		
Isles of Capri	1	Collier		
Isleworth	1	Orange	32786	
Istachatta	1	Hernando	34636	
Istokpoga	1	Highlands		
Istokpoga Shores	1	Highlands	33857	
Italia	1	Nassau		
Ivan	1	Wakulla	32301	
Ivanhoe Estates	1	Broward		
Ives	1	Brevard		
Ives Estates	1	Miami-Dade	33162	
Izagora	1	Holmes	32427	
Jacaranda	1	Broward	33322	
Jacaranda West	1	Sarasota		
Jackson Bluff	1	Leon		
Jackson Still	1	Walton	32433	
Jacksonville	1	Duval	32201	99
Jacksonville Air Mail Facility	1	Duval	32229	
Jacksonville A T O	1	Duval	32229	
Jacksonville Beach	1	Duval	32250	
Jacksonville Beaches	1	Duval		
Jacksonville Heights	1	Duval	32210	
Jacksonville Junction	1	Duval		
Jacksonville Naval Air Station	1	Duval	32212	
Jacksonville Naval Regional Medical Center	1	Duval	32214	
Jacksonville Navy Fuel Depot	1	Duval	32208	
Jacksonville University	1	Duval	32211	
Jacob City	1	Jackson	32431	
Jacobs	1	Jackson	32431	
Jamestown	1	Seminole	32765	
Jamieson	1	Gadsden		
Jan Phyl Village	1	Polk	33880	
Jarrott	1	Jefferson	32344	
Jasmine Estates	1	Pasco	33568	
Jasper	1	Hamilton	32052	
Jay	1	Santa Rosa	32565	
Jay Jay	1	Brevard		
Jena	1	Dixie	32359	
Jenada Isles	1	Broward	33311	
Jennings	1	Hamilton	32053	
Jensen Beach	1	Martin	34957	
Jerome	1	Collier	33926	
Jessamine	1	Pasco	33525	
Jessie Willies	1	Broward		
Jewfish	1	Monroe		
John F. Kennedy Space Center	1	Brevard		
Johnson	1	Putnam	32640	
Johnson Crossroad	1	Washington		
Johnson Crossroads	1	Putnam		
Johnsons Corner	1	Lake		
John's Pass	1	Pinellas	33708	
Johnstown	1	Union		
Jolly Corner	1	Hillsborough		
Jonathans Landing	1	Palm Beach		
Jonesboro	1	Dixie		
Jones Corner	1	Polk		
Jones Landing	1	Seminole		
Jonesville	1	Alachua	32601	
Joshua	1	DeSoto	33821	
Joydon	1	Polk		
Judson	1	Levy	32693	
Jug Island	1	Taylor		
Juliette	1	Marion		
Julington Creek	1	St. Johns		
Julington Creek Plantation	1	St. Johns		
June Park	1	Brevard	32901	
Jungle	1	Pinellas		
Juniper	1	Gadsden		
Juno Beach	1	Palm Beach	33408	
Juno Ridge	1	Palm Beach		
Jupiter	1	Palm Beach	33468	
Jupiter Farms	1	Palm Beach		
Jupiter Inlet Colony	1	Palm Beach	33468	
Jupiter Island	1	Martin	33455	
Kalamazoo	1	Volusia		
Kanapaha	1	Alachua		
Kathleen	1	Polk	33849	
Keaton Beach	1	Taylor	32347	
Keela	1	Palm Beach		
Keene	1	Nassau		
Keentown	1	Manatee		
Kellys Mill	1	Okaloosa		
Kenansville	1	Osceola	34739	
Kendale Lakes	1	Miami-Dade		
Kendall	1	Miami-Dade	33156	
Kendall Green	1	Broward		
Kendall Lakes West	1	Miami-Dade		
Kendall West	1	Miami-Dade		
Kendrick	1	Marion	32670	
Kennedy Hill	1	Hillsborough		
Kennedy Space Center	1	Brevard	32815	
Kennedy Still	1	Hamilton		
Kenneth City	1	Pinellas	33709	
Kenny	1	Baker		
Kensington Park	1	Sarasota	33577	
Kent	1	Nassau		
Kent Mill	1	Jackson		
Kenwood Estates	1	Palm Beach		
Keri	1	Hendry		
Kern	1	Liberty		
Kerr City	1	Marion	32627	
Keuka	1	Putnam	32640	
Key Biscayne	1	Miami-Dade	33149	
Key Colony Beach	1	Monroe	33051	
Key Haven	1	Monroe		
Key Largo	1	Monroe	33037	
Key Largo Park	1	Monroe	33037	
Key Largo Village	1	Monroe	33037	
Keys	1	Miami-Dade		
Keystone	1	Hillsborough		
Keystone Heights	1	Clay	32656	
Keystone Islands	1	Miami-Dade	33161	
Keysville	1	Hillsborough	33547	
Key Vista	1	Pasco		
Key West	1	Monroe	33040	41
Key West Naval Air Station	1	Monroe	33040	
Key West Naval Hospital	1	Monroe	33040	
Kilarney Shores	1	Duval	32216	
Killarney	1	Orange	32740	
Killearn	1	Leon		
Killearn Estates	1	Leon	32303	
Killingsworth Crossroads	1	Okaloosa		
Kimbrough	1	Marion		
Kinard	1	Calhoun	32449	
Kincaid Hills	1	Alachua		
Kings Bay	1	Miami-Dade	33158	
Kings Ferry	1	Nassau	32046	
Kingsford	1	Polk		
Kingsland	1	Palm Beach		
Kingsley	1	Clay		
Kingsley Beach	1	Clay		
Kingsley Lake	1	Clay	32091	
Kingsley Village	1	Clay	32091	
Kings Point	1	Palm Beach		
Kings Road	1	Duval	32205	
Kingston	1	Volusia		
Kingswood Manor	1	Orange	32804	
Kinsey	1	Hardee		
Kirby Loop	1	St. Lucie	33450	
Kirkland	1	Marion		
Kirkwood	1	Alachua	32667	
Kissimmee	1	Osceola	32741	59
Kissimmee Park	1	Osceola	32769	
Kite	1	Bradford		
Knights	1	Hillsborough	33566	
Knott	1	Palm Beach		
Knoxhill	1	Walton	32455	
Koerber	1	Walton		
Korona	1	Flagler	32010	
Kossuthville	1	Polk	33823	
Kuhlman	1	Highlands		
Kynesville	1	Jackson	32431	

== See also ==
- Florida
- List of municipalities in Florida
- List of former municipalities in Florida
- List of counties in Florida
- List of census-designated places in Florida
