= National Register of Historic Places listings in Dixie County, Florida =

Location of Dixie County in Florida

This is a list of the National Register of Historic Places listings in Dixie County, Florida.

This is intended to be a complete list of the properties on the National Register of Historic Places in Dixie County, Florida. The locations of National Register properties for which the latitude and longitude coordinates are included below, may be seen in a map.

There are 2 properties listed on the National Register in the county.

This National Park Service list is complete through NPS recent listings posted March 21, 2025.

Contents: Counties in Florida (non-linked contain no National Register listings)
Alachua - Baker - Bay - Bradford - Brevard - Broward - Calhoun - Charlotte - Citrus - Clay - Collier - Columbia - DeSoto - Dixie - Duval - Escambia - Flagler - Franklin - Gadsden - Gilchrist - Glades - Gulf - Hamilton - Hardee - Hendry - Hernando - Highlands - Hillsborough (Tampa) - Holmes - Indian River - Jackson - Jefferson - Lafayette - Lake - Lee - Leon - Levy - Liberty - Madison - Manatee - Marion - Martin - Miami-Dade (Miami) - Monroe - Nassau - Okaloosa - Okeechobee - Orange - Osceola - Palm Beach - Pasco - Pinellas - Polk - Putnam - St. Johns - St. Lucie - Santa Rosa - Sarasota - Seminole - Sumter - Suwannee - Taylor - Union - Volusia - Wakulla - Walton - Washington

== Current listings ==
	Name on the Register	Image	Date listed	Location	City or town	Description
1	CITY OF HAWKINSVILLE (shipwreck)	CITY OF HAWKINSVILLE (shipwreck)	May 31, 2001 (#01000533)	Suwannee River, 100 yards south of the Old Town railroad trestle 29°36′26″N 82°58′15″W	Old Town	
2	Garden Patch Archeological Site (8Di4)		April 25, 1991 (#91000454)	Address Restricted	Horseshoe Beach	

== See also ==
- List of National Historic Landmarks in Florida
- National Register of Historic Places listings in Florida
