= Deptford culture =

Archaeological culture in the US

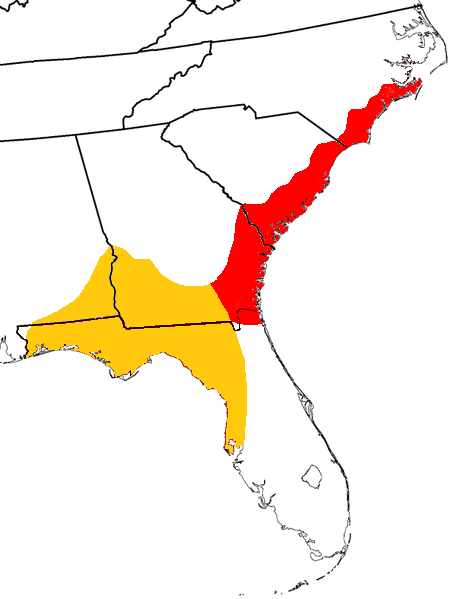
Approximate range of Deptford culture at maximum extent, 500 BCE - 200 CE, with Atlantic region in red and Gulf region in gold

The Deptford culture (800 BCE—700 CE) was an archaeological culture in southeastern North America characterized by the appearance of elaborate ceremonial complexes, increasing social and political complexity, mound burial, permanent settlements, population growth, and an increasing reliance on cultigens.

== Definition and range ==
Deptford is named for the Deptford area near Savannah, Georgia. The culture is defined by the presence of sand-tempered pottery decorated with the impressions of carved wooden paddles that were pressed against the vessels before they were fired. The sand-tempering distinguishes Deptford ceramics from the fiber-tempered ceramics of the late-Archaic Stallings Island/St. Simons, Orange, and Norwood cultures that preceded it. Other contemporary cultures of the southeastern United States also produced paddle decorated ceramics.

The Deptford culture was oriented to the coast. From Georgia it spread along the Atlantic coast, reaching Cape Fear, North Carolina to the north and the mouth of the St. Johns River to the south. The Deptford culture also spread along the Gulf of Mexico coast, reaching from the Perdido River on the western border of Florida to Tampa Bay on the lower west coast of Florida. Deptford culture appeared in Florida around 500 BCE. The Deptford culture in the Gulf region (Florida Panhandle, southeast Alabama and southwest Georgia) evolved into the Swift Creek and Santa Rosa-Swift Creek cultures around 200 CE, while the culture in the Atlantic coastal region continued until about 700. The Cades Pond culture developed from the Deptford culture after 100 CE in an inland region previously used seasonally by Deptford people.

In the eastern Florida Panhandle the Deptford culture has been divided into an early Deptford period, in which fiber-tempered and Deptford series ceramics are found together, a middle Deptford period, with only Deptford series ceramics present, and a late Deptford period with both Deptford series and Swift Creek series ceramics present.

Archaeological sites associated with the Deptford culture include:

=== Atlantic coast ===
- Tar River, North Carolina
- G. S. Lewis-West site, middle Savannah River
- Brewton Hill site, eastern Savannah, Georgia
- Dulany site, eastern Savannah
- Irene Mound site, northwest of Savannah
- Refuge site, north of Savannah
- Meldrim site, southeast of Savannah
- Haven Home site, southwest of Savannah

=== Northwest Florida ===
The Florida Panhandle from the Perdido River to the Aucilla River.

- Hawkshaw site, in Pensacola, Florida
- The Block-Sterns site, Lake Lafayette, Tallahassee, Florida
- Site 8LE484 on the northern shore of Lake Miccosukee, Leon County, Florida

The sites in Leon County represent significant inland Deptford period sites.

=== North peninsular Gulf coast of Florida ===
The Gulf coast of Florida from the Aucilla River to the Anclote River, extending 15 miles (24 km) to 20 miles (32 km) inland.

- Bird Island (8DI52), near Horseshoe Beach, Florida
- Garden Patch (8DI14), near Horseshoe Beach, Florida
- Cat Island (8DI29), north of the mouth of the Suwannee River
- Little Bradford Island (8DI32), in the mouth of the Suwannee River
- Sites 8LV75 and 8LV76 on Deer Island, between the mouth of the Suwannee River and Cedar Key, Florida
- Shell Mound (8DI42), north of Cedar Key
- Palmetto Mound (8LV2), north of Cedar Key
- Richards Island (8LV137), north of Cedar Key
- North Key (8LV65, 66a), in the Cedar Keys
- Seahorse Key (8LV64, 68), in the Cedar Keys
- Crystal River site, Florida

Many Deptford culture sites along the Gulf coast may now be under water, or eroded by rising water levels, as the sea level along the coast of the Florida Panhandle has risen approximately 80 inches (2.0 m) in the last 2,000 years.

== Artifacts ==
Early Deptford ceramics appear to have been developed in Georgia around 2,600 years ago out of the Early Woodland Refuge phase (near Savannah), and spread north into South Carolina and North Carolina and south into Florida. Deptford ceramics continued to be made and found on Middle Woodland sites in the southeastern U.S. until about 600 BCE. Occupation for the Atlantic coastal plain of Georgia and the Carolinas seems to have followed a seasonal pattern of winter shellfish camps on the coast, then inland occupation during the spring and summer for deer hunting, and fall for nut gathering.

From the Early through the Middle Woodland periods, the extensive, low-lying coastal environment of the South Atlantic coast, stretching from North Carolina to northern Florida, was used by numerous Deptford hunter-gatherer bands who lived seasonally within a variety of ecosystems and took advantage of seasonally available foods.

Along the Gulf Coast, the Deptford culture continued the seasonal existence throughout the Middle Woodland. Settlements in this geographical area lacked permanence of occupation, although the cultures here participated in the Hopewellian trading network to a limited extent and constructed numerous low sand burial mounds. These sand burial mounds along coastal Georgia and Florida (noted at Canaveral National Seashore and Cumberland Island National Seashore, for instance), as well as in the Carolinas, are believed to represent local lineage burial grounds rather than the resting place of an elite individual.

In northwestern Florida, the Early Woodland Deptford culture evolved in place to become the Swift Creek and Santa Rosa-Swift Creek cultures. Trade items recovered from burial mounds include copper panpipes, ear ornaments, stone plummets, and stone gorgets. These show this area's incorporation within the Hopewellian Interaction Sphere by about 1,900 years ago.
