= John Ewel =

American biologist

John Jeffrey Ewel is an emeritus professor and tropical succession researcher in the department of biology at the University of Florida. Most of his research was conducted through experimental trials to understand ecosystem processes in terrestrial and tropical environments. The results of the research provided the ability to further comprehend forest structure and management, as well as its nutrient dynamics. The primary research conducted dealt with the beginning stages of the regrowth and recovery following agriculture practices. Ewel also participated in studies regarding invasive species and restoration ecology.

== Schooling and early career ==
As an undergraduate, Ewel studied forestry at the State University of New York College of Environmental Science and Forestry. He focused on the biology and management of natural resources and the environment, and after graduation in 1962, he attended a graduate summer program in Puerto Rico. He remained in Puerto Rice to work for the U.S. Forest Service Institute of Tropical Forestry to examine the effects of irradiation on a tropical forest. In 1963, Joe Tosi hired Ewel to work in an ecological mapping of Venezuela.

After three years, Ewel returned to the United States and completed his M.S degree with Hugh Popenoe at the University of Florida, focusing on litter decay in Guatemalan second-growth vegetation. His Ph.D was completed by working under Howard T. Odum to study the succession in three sites in Costa Rica and two sites in Puerto Rico.

== Career ==
In 1971, University of Florida hired Ewel. While he was working in UF, he was also active in the formation of Corcovado National Park in Costa Rica from 1974 to 1975. In 1990, Ewel became the President of ATB, serving on the Board of Directors and advising for multiple committees at the Organization for Tropical Studies. In 1994, he retired from the University of Florida and became director of the U.S. Forest Service's Institute of Pacific Islands Forestry, r. d responsible for research as well as outreach programs in American Samoa, Commonwealth of Northern Marines, Guam, Hawaii, Marshall Islands, Micronesia, and Palau. In 2005, he retired from U.S. Forest Service, and in 2015 became an Honorary Fellow at the Association of Tropical Biology and Conservation. As an Emeritus Professor at the University of Florida, he still publishes occasionally. In 2017 Ewel was named a Fellow of the American Association for the Advancement of Science, "for distinguished contributions to the field of ecology, particularly to our understanding of tropical ecosystem functioning and management".

== Research ==
=== Tropical succession ===
Ewel's research was conducted on successional landscapes by examining the regrowth and recovery following agriculture practices in Guatemala, Sarawak, Puerto Rico, and Costa Rica. He examined the succession in its natural occurrence as well as in some cases were human-induced second growth by burning the forest to represent a farmer clearing a field for crop production. Other research he had conducted had examined the tropical succession using the gradients of temperature and moisture to gather more data for further analysis.

=== Biodiversity and longevity of plants ===
Ewel and his fellow researchers, conducted two experiments in Costa Rica, at Centro Agronómico Tropical de Investigación y Enseñanza, The variables of the experiments were to investigate the plant's productivity, their nutrient loss, and interactions with other species of plants, competitors, as well as their consumers. Examined the plant's resistance to pesticides as well as soil fertility after erosion of harvesting annual crops.

=== Novel ecosystems ===
In the 1970s, Ewel and his colleges chose certain aquatic habitats with either a nutrient-rich (heavily polluted) environment or a nutrient-poor environment. The researchers added little clusters of water hyacinth to each environment. The results showed that the heavily nutrient-rich aquatic environment had extremely abundant and heavily dense water hyacinths compared to the water hyacinths growing in the nutrient-poor aquatic environment, thus showing human activities alter the fundamental stability of that ecosystem. Since then, more research was conducted to understand changes due to land use by humans and develop new methods to manage the ecosystems in a more sustainable manner.

== Selected publications ==
Books:

- Myers, R. L. & J. J. Ewel (eds.). 1990. Ecosystems of Florida. University Presses of Florida, Gainesville. 765 pp.
- Ewel, J., A. Madríz & J. Tosi. 1968. Las Zonas de Vida de Venezuela: Memoria Explicativa Sobre el Mapa Ecológico. Ministerio de Agricultura y Cría, Caracas. 165 p. + map. (Revised and reprinted 1978.)

Book chapters:

- Ewel, J. 1983. Succession. Chapter 13, pp. 217–223 in F. B. Golley (ed.) Ecosystems of the World. Vol. 14A. Tropical Rain Forest Ecosystems: Structure and Function of Tropical Forests. Elsevier, Amsterdam.
- Ewel, J. J., J. Mascaro, C. Kueffer, A. E. Lugo, L. Lach, & M. R. Gardener. 2013. Islands: Where novelty is the norm. pp. 29–44 in: R. J. Hobbs, E. S. Higgs, and C. M. Hall (eds.) Novel Ecosystems: Intervening in the New Ecological World Order. John Wiley & Sons, Ltd. NY
- Ewel, J. J. 2013. Case study: Hole-in-the-donut, Everglades. pp. 11–15 in: R. J. Hobbs, E. S. Higgs, and C. M. Hall (eds.) Novel Ecosystems: Intervening in the New Ecological World Order. John Wiley & Sons, Ltd. NY
- Ewel, J. J. 1987. Restoration is the ultimate test of ecological theory. pp. 31–33 in: W. R. Jordan, M. E. Gilpin, and J. D. Aber (eds.). Restoration Ecology.Cambridge University Press, Cambridge, U.K.
- Ewel, J. 1986. Invasibility: Lessons from South Florida. Chapt. 13, pp. 214–230 in: H. Mooney and J. Drake (eds.). Ecology of Biological Invasions of North America and Hawaii. Springer-Verlag, N. Y.
