= Bird Hammock =

- U.S. National Register of Historic Places
- Nearest city: Wakulla Beach, Florida
- Area: 22 acres (8.9 ha)
- NRHP reference No.: 72000357
- Added to NRHP: December 15, 1972

The Bird Hammock is a historic site in Wakulla Beach, Florida. It is located two miles north of Wakulla Beach. On December 15, 1972, it was added to the U.S. National Register of Historic Places.

It is primarily an archaeological site, as it was inhabited prior to 1000 A.D. by Native Americans during the Swift Creek to Weedon Island periods. The area contains burial mounds and middens, and is believed to have also served for ceremonial purposes. Access is restricted to preserve the site's integrity.
