= Pasadena Hills, Florida =

- Unincorporated community
- Coordinates: 28°16′12″N 82°14′36″W
- Country: United States
- State: Florida
- County: Pasco

Area
  - Total: 31.323 sq mi (81.13 km^{2})
  - Land: 30.248 sq mi (78.34 km^{2})
  - Water: 1.075 sq mi (2.78 km^{2})
- Elevation: 187 ft (57 m)

Population (2010)
  - Total: 7,570
  - Density: 250/sq mi (96.6/km^{2})
- Time zone: UTC-5 (Eastern (EST))
  - Summer (DST): UTC-4 (EDT)
- Area code: 352
- GNIS feature ID: 2583373

Pasadena Hills is an unincorporated community and census-designated place in Pasco County, Florida, United States. As of the 2020 census, Pasadena Hills had a population of 11,120. The community was originally planned in 1925.

== Geography ==
According to the U.S. Census Bureau, the community has an area of 31.323 square miles (81.13 km^{2}); 30.248 square miles (78.34 km^{2}) of its area is land, and 1.075 square miles (2.78 km^{2}) is water.

== Demographics ==
Pasadena Hills first appeared as a census designated place in the 2010 U.S. census.

=== 2020 census ===
As of the 2020 census, Pasadena Hills had a population of 11,120. The median age was 43.6 years. 22.2% of residents were under the age of 18 and 21.7% of residents were 65 years of age or older. For every 100 females there were 92.9 males, and for every 100 females age 18 and over there were 90.9 males age 18 and over.

51.7% of residents lived in urban areas, while 48.3% lived in rural areas.

There were 4,262 households in Pasadena Hills, of which 31.6% had children under the age of 18 living in them. Of all households, 57.4% were married-couple households, 13.9% were households with a male householder and no spouse or partner present, and 22.0% were households with a female householder and no spouse or partner present. About 22.4% of all households were made up of individuals and 12.3% had someone living alone who was 65 years of age or older.

There were 4,810 housing units, of which 11.4% were vacant. The homeowner vacancy rate was 3.3% and the rental vacancy rate was 10.6%.

Racial composition as of the 2020 census
Race	Number	Percent
White	7,720	69.4%
Black or African American	1,100	9.9%
American Indian and Alaska Native	38	0.3%
Asian	331	3.0%
Native Hawaiian and Other Pacific Islander	17	0.2%
Some other race	529	4.8%
Two or more races	1,385	12.5%
Hispanic or Latino (of any race)	2,030	18.3%
