= Wakulla Beach, Florida =

- Unincorporated community
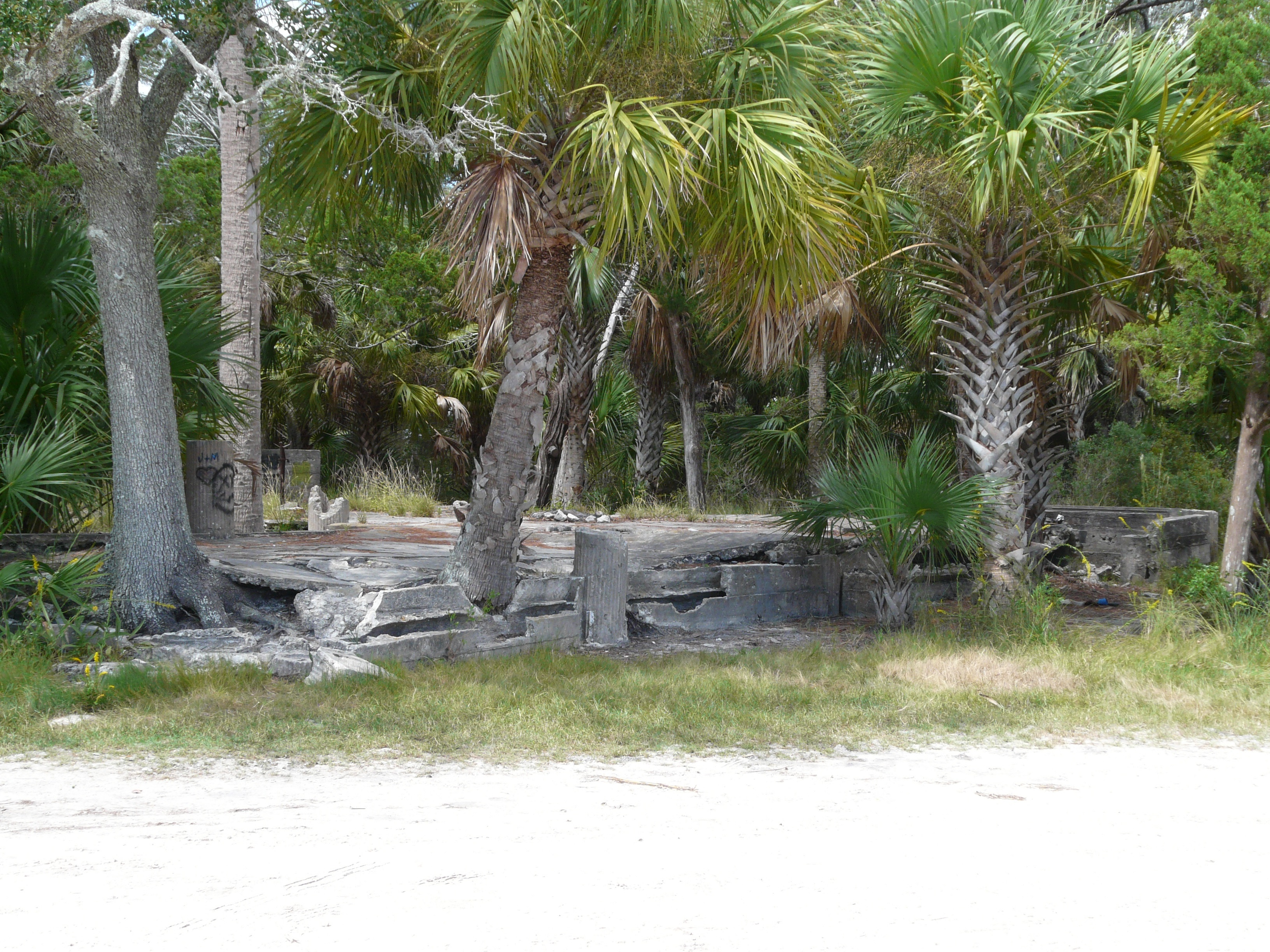
- Ruins of the Wakulla Beach Hotel

- Location within Florida
- Coordinates: 30°06′33″N 84°15′33″W
- Country: United States
- State: Florida
- County: Wakulla
- Elevation: 7 ft (2.1 m)
- Time zone: UTC-5 (Eastern (EST))
  - Summer (DST): UTC-4 (EDT)
- Area code: 850
- GNIS feature ID: 306548

Wakulla Beach is an unincorporated community in Wakulla County, Florida, United States. It is located on the northern shore of Goose Creek Bay, near the Gulf of Mexico.

Founded as East Goose Creek in 1915, this was a platted town that was supposed to bring tourists and visitors to northern Florida. Only a couple of houses remain. A hotel ruin is also visible, dating to the 1920s. There is no beach per se, instead a primitive boat ramp on a shallow bay. No amenities are available at this spot in the St. Marks National Wildlife Refuge, at the end of a long dirt road.

== Geography ==
Wakulla Beach is located at 30°06′33″N 84°15′33″W (30.10917, -84.25917).

== History ==
The town was founded in 1915 and developed by Henry Walker Sr., a state senator. Said to be Florida's first subdivision, it did not bring large numbers of people to reside there.

== National historic status ==
There is a U.S. National Historic Landmark to the north of Wakulla Beach, known as Bird Hammock. It was home to Native Americans during the first millennium AD.
