= Dade City North, Florida =

- CDP
- Location in Pasco County and the state of Florida
- Coordinates: 28°22′45″N 82°11′18″W
- Country: United States
- State: Florida
- County: Pasco

Area
  - Total: 1.55 sq mi (4.02 km^{2})
  - Land: 1.55 sq mi (4.01 km^{2})
  - Water: 0.0039 sq mi (0.01 km^{2})
- Elevation: 79 ft (24 m)

Population (2020)
  - Total: 3,002
  - Density: 1,938.1/sq mi (748.31/km^{2})
- Time zone: UTC-5 (Eastern (EST))
  - Summer (DST): UTC-4 (EDT)
- FIPS code: 12-16175
- GNIS feature ID: 2402398

Dade City North is a census-designated place (CDP) in eastern Pasco County, Florida, United States. As of the 2020 census, Dade City North had a population of 3,002.

== Geography ==
According to the United States Census Bureau, the CDP has a total area of 1.8 square miles (4.7 km^{2}), of which, 1.8 square miles (4.7 km^{2}) of it is land and 0.04 square miles (0.10 km^{2}) of it (1.09%) is water.

== Demographics ==
Historical population
Census	Pop.	Note	%±
1970	1,837		—
1980	3,151		71.5%
1990	3,058		−3.0%
2000	3,319		8.5%
2020	3,002		—

=== 2020 census ===
As of the 2020 census, Dade City North had a population of 3,002. The median age was 31.4 years. 31.4% of residents were under the age of 18 and 10.0% of residents were 65 years of age or older. For every 100 females there were 100.3 males, and for every 100 females age 18 and over there were 96.4 males age 18 and over.

100.0% of residents lived in urban areas, while 0.0% lived in rural areas.

There were 906 households in Dade City North, of which 42.1% had children under the age of 18 living in them. Of all households, 37.3% were married-couple households, 19.6% were households with a male householder and no spouse or partner present, and 32.7% were households with a female householder and no spouse or partner present. About 20.4% of all households were made up of individuals and 9.1% had someone living alone who was 65 years of age or older.

There were 990 housing units, of which 8.5% were vacant. The homeowner vacancy rate was 0.9% and the rental vacancy rate was 6.1%.

Racial composition as of the 2020 census
Race	Number	Percent
White	1,148	38.2%
Black or African American	287	9.6%
American Indian and Alaska Native	24	0.8%
Asian	5	0.2%
Native Hawaiian and Other Pacific Islander	0	0.0%
Some other race	919	30.6%
Two or more races	619	20.6%
Hispanic or Latino (of any race)	1,986	66.2%

=== 2000 census ===
As of the 2000 census, there were 3,319 people, 910 households, and 663 families residing in the CDP. The population density was 1,824.2 inhabitants per square mile (704.3/km^{2}). There were 1,017 housing units at an average density of 559.0 per square mile (215.8/km^{2}). The racial makeup of the CDP was 55.05% White, 10.79% African American, 0.48% Native American, 0.12% Asian, 0.06% Pacific Islander, 29.77% from other races, and 3.74% from two or more races. Hispanic or Latino of any race were 56.49% of the population.

There were 910 households, out of which 43.5% had children under the age of 18 living with them, 45.9% were married couples living together, 17.1% had a female householder with no husband present, and 27.1% were non-families. 19.2% of all households were made up of individuals, and 8.8% had someone living alone who was 65 years of age or older. The average household size was 3.39 and the average family size was 3.81.

In the CDP, the population was spread out, with 33.1% under the age of 18, 14.9% from 18 to 24, 29.3% from 25 to 44, 16.1% from 45 to 64, and 6.7% who were 65 years of age or older. The median age was 26 years. For every 100 females, there were 121.3 males. For every 100 females age 18 and over, there were 125.8 males.

The median income for a household in the CDP was $25,000, and the median income for a family was $25,987. Males had a median income of $18,817 versus $17,393 for females. The per capita income for the CDP was $10,129. About 22.7% of families and 29.1% of the population were below the poverty line, including 36.3% of those under age 18 and 20.6% of those age 65 or over.
