= Garden Patch Archeological Site =

Archaeological site in Florida, United States

- Garden Patch Archeological Site (8Di4)
- U.S. National Register of Historic Places
- Location within Florida Location within the United States
- Location: Dixie County, Florida
- Nearest city: Horseshoe Beach
- Coordinates: 29.44°N 83.29°W
- Area: 21 acres (8.5 ha)
- NRHP reference No.: 91000454
- Added to NRHP: April 25, 1991

The Garden Patch is a Middle Woodland archaeological site in Horseshoe Cove, near Horseshoe Beach, Florida, off County Road 351. For a major part of its occupation, the site was a ceremonial center associated with the Swift Creek and Weeden Island cultures. On April 25, 1991, it was added to the U.S. National Register of Historic Places.

== Horseshoe Cove ==
Garden Patch is sixteen kilometers (ten miles) north of the mouth of the Suwannee River, and two km (1.2 mi) from the Gulf of Mexico, near the western end of Horseshoe Cove, a slight indentation in the Big Bend Coast on the Gulf Coast of Florida. The Big Bend Coast has a very shallow slope, with a thin layer of soil, primarily sand, over limestone. It consists of fresh-water swamps and ponds, salt-water marshes and ponds, tidal flats and tidal creeks. Dunes that formed on slightly raised spots in the underlying limestone during the late Pleistocene emerge as islands along the coast and support coastal hammocks inland. Sea level rise in the last few thousand years has transformed old dunes that were inland into islands.

Seventeen archaeological sites adjacent to the western half of Horseshoe Cove (some 36 square kilometres (14 sq mi) in area) have been identified. The history of those sites appear to be related to the rise of Garden Patch as a ceremonial center. The western Horseshoe Cove is surrounded by a 6-to-12-kilometre (3.7 to 7.5 mi) wide area in which no archaeological sites have been found.

Two islands in Horseshoe Cove, Butler Island, and Bird Island, have archaeological sites related to Garden Patch. The sites on Butler and Bird islands were originally on the mainland, but a rise in sea level cut them off from the mainland. The site on Bird Island was occupied 2480–2290 BC, 360–170 BC, and, after the site had become an island, 810–980. Butler Island was occupied 170 BC – AD 5 and, after the site had become an island, 885–1215. Garden Patch was occupied 25–120 AD and 240–980. The first occupation of the Garden Patch, 25–120 AD, is interpreted as a homestead. Starting around 240, a new occupation of the site resulted in the construction of mounds, marking Garden Patch as a ceremonial center, contemporary with the development of ceremonial centers at Crystal River and Shell Mound (near Cedar Key). The ceremonial center continued in use for about three centuries, and then was abandoned. Later, a previously unused area next to the ceremonial center was occupied for a couple of centuries.

== Description ==
Clarence Bloomfield Moore investigated three mounds "near Horseshoe Point" in 1902. Wallis and McFadden identify those mounds with mounds VII, V, and VI at the Garden Patch site. Moore excavated some burials and a few artifacts from Mound V. A surface collection at the site was conducted in 1948. Test excavations of the site were conducted in the 1970s by archaeology students. Starting in 2010, the site was mapped and additional excavations conducted.

The Garden Patch site consists of six mounds, three midden areas, and a pond on an ancient dune. The mounds range from less than one meter to a little more than 2.5 meters in height. The mounds and midden areas form a "horseshoe-shaped ring" surrounding a central plaza with little or no artifacts or refuse. Such "rings" are commonly found in ceremonial centers of the Middle Woodland period in northern Florida and southern Georgia.

Mound IV was originally believed to be a human constructed mound, but investigation revealed it was natural. It was occupied for several centuries starting from early in the history of the site. Wallis and McFadden speculate that Garden Patch was chosen as a village site because of the presence of Mound IV, in association with the pond and other natural mounds that were later artificially raised with shell and/or sand deposits. Occupation of Mound IV appears to have been most extensive in the 4th century.

Mound V has received attention from archaeologists since Moore dug in it in 1902. The mound started as a low natural mound. It was used for some burials, and a structure that may have been a charnel house was placed on it. The mound was covered with a 1.5 meter thick layer of oyster shells in or around the 4th century. A sand cap was added to the mound later. Wallis and McFadden compare that sequence to the construction of Mound D at Kolomaki and of Mound C at the McKeithen site. Radiocarbon dates place the construction of Mound V contemporaneous with that of Mound D at Kolomaki and probably earlier than Mound C at McKeithen. Unlike Mound C at McKeithen, but similar to mounds at the nearby Hughes Island Mound and Palmetto Mound sites, burials and artifacts were found in the sand cap of Mound V.

Some pottery sherds found at Garden Patch reveal connections with distant sites. A type of pottery called Swift Creek Complicated Stamped were stamped with carved paddles before being fired. Sherds found at Garden Patch had been stamped with the same paddle as sherds found at Kolomaki and at the Block-Sterns site in Leon County, Florida.

== Sources ==
- McFadden, Paulette S. (2016). "Coastal Dynamics and Pre-Columbian Human Occupation in Horseshoe Cove on the Northern Gulf Coast of Florida, USA". Geoarchaeology. 31 (5): 355–375. doi:10.1002/gea.21549 – via Academia.edu.
- Wallis, Neill J.; McFadden, Paulette S. (February 12, 2016). "Recovering the Forgotten Woodland Mound Excavations at Garden Patch (8DI4)". Southeastern Archaeology. 35 (3): 194–212. doi:10.1080/0734578X.2015.1106211. ISSN 2168-4723. S2CID 130760729 – via Academia.edu.
- Wallis, Neill J.; McFadden, Paulette S. (December 2019). "Woodland Period Environmental and Settlement History of Horseshoe Cove, Northern Gulf Coast of Florida". The Florida Anthropologist. 71: 191–206 – via Academia.edu.
- Wallis, Neill J.; McFadden, Paulette S.; Singleton, Hayley M. (2015). "Radiocarbon dating the pace of monument construction and village aggregation at Garden Patch: A ceremonial center on the Florida Gulf Coast". Journal of Archaeological Science: Reports. 2: 507–517. doi:10.1016/j.jasrep.2015.05.009 – via Academia.edu.
