= Julington Creek Plantation, Florida =

Unincorporated community in Florida, U.S.

Coordinates: 30.121381°N 81.625298°W

- Interactive map of Julington Creek Plantation, Florida
- Country: United States
- State: Florida
- City: St. Johns, Florida

Area
  - Total: 4,120 acres (1,670 ha)
- Time zone: Eastern Standard Time

Julington Creek Plantation is an unincorporated community in the larger community of St. Johns, St. Johns County, Florida, United States. It consists of several large neighborhoods, and is located along Race Track Road east of State Road 13, across from Fruit Cove (which is also the name of a census-designated place that includes Julington Creek Plantation).

== Geography ==
Julington Creek Plantation Community Development District encompasses approximately 4,120 acres and is located in northwest St. John’s County, approximately twenty miles south of downtown Jacksonville, seven miles south of Interstate 295, and fifteen miles west of the Atlantic Ocean.

== Schools ==
Julington Creek Plantation is served by the highest ranked schools in Florida which, according to the Huffington Post, are among the "Top Ten in the Country".

St. Johns County schools have received a state government grade of "A" for their work with the students and FCAT grading from 2004 to 2014.
