= Moon Lake, Florida =

- CDP
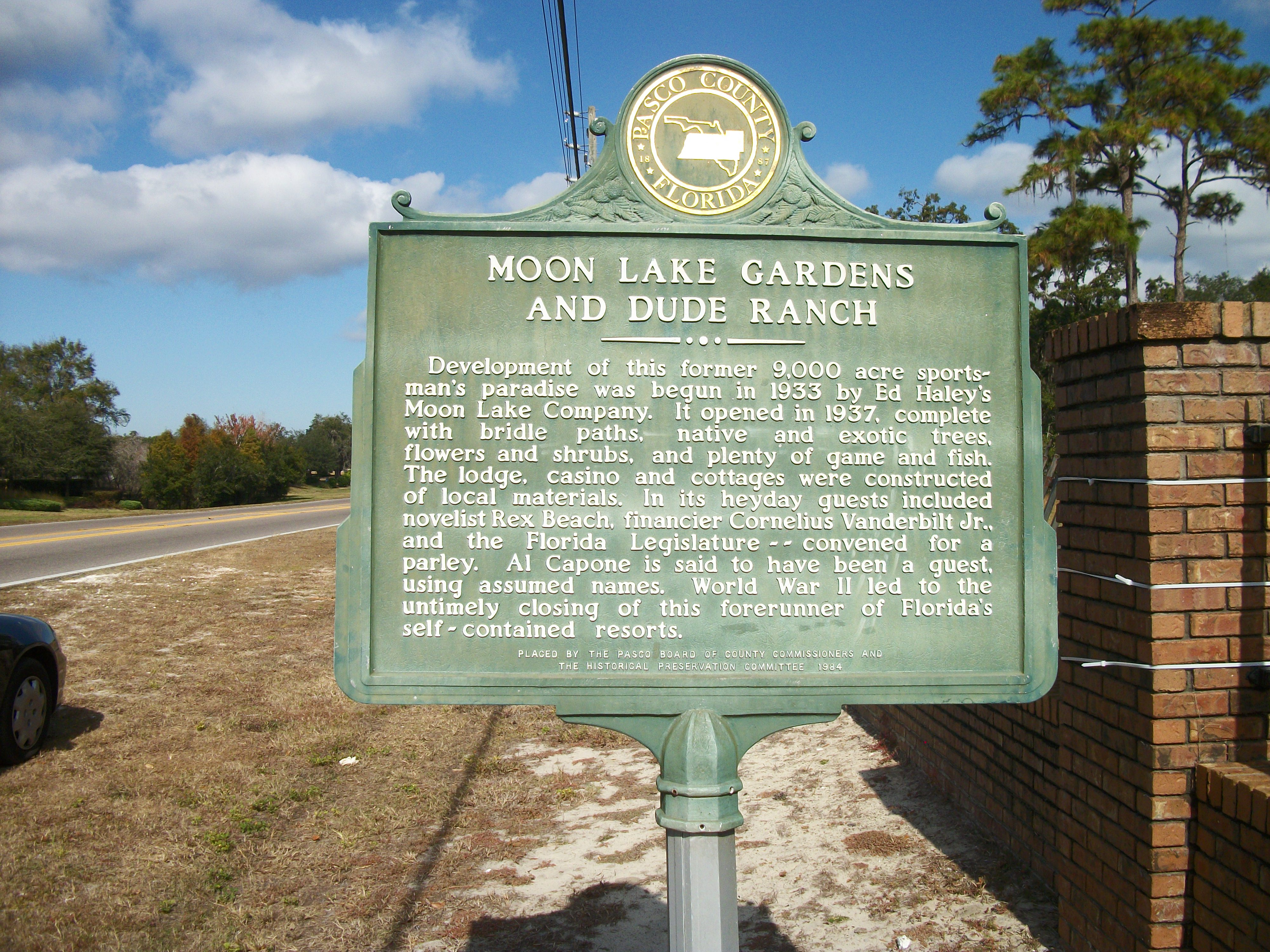
- Historical marker for the Moon Lake Gardens and Dude Ranch along Pasco County Road 587

- Location in Pasco County and the state of Florida
- Coordinates: 28°16′48″N 82°36′55″W
- Country: United States
- State: Florida
- County: Pasco

Area
  - Total: 6.04 sq mi (15.6 km^{2})
  - Land: 5.68 sq mi (14.7 km^{2})
  - Water: 0.36 sq mi (0.93 km^{2})
- Elevation: 39 ft (12 m)

Population (2020)
  - Total: 4,817
  - Density: 848/sq mi (327/km^{2})
- Time zone: UTC-5 (Eastern (EST))
  - Summer (DST): UTC-4 (EDT)
- ZIP code: 34654
- Area code: 727
- FIPS code: 12-46540
- GNIS feature ID: 2583365

Moon Lake is a census-designated place (CDP) in Pasco County, Florida, United States. It is a suburb of the Tampa-St. Petersburg-Clearwater, Florida Metropolitan Statistical Area. The population was 4,817 as of the 2020 census.

Moon Lake Road passes through the area. Moon Lake was once home to the Moon Lake Gardens Dude Ranch, built between 1933 and 1937 by the owner of Clearwater, Florida's Fort Harrison Hotel, Ed Haley. The tourist resort included cottages, a casino, and gardens. Moon Lake's elementary school scored an A on state evaluations. At 4,458, it has 75% of its population from lower income homes. The ZIP Code for Moon Lake is 34654.

== Demographics ==
Moon Lake first appeared as a census designated place in the 2010 U.S. census.

=== 2020 census ===
As of the 2020 census, Moon Lake had a population of 4,817. The median age was 43.7 years. 19.1% of residents were under the age of 18 and 16.1% of residents were 65 years of age or older. For every 100 females there were 108.0 males, and for every 100 females age 18 and over there were 110.6 males age 18 and over.

91.1% of residents lived in urban areas, while 8.9% lived in rural areas.

There were 1,947 households in Moon Lake, of which 23.7% had children under the age of 18 living in them. Of all households, 36.3% were married-couple households, 26.5% were households with a male householder and no spouse or partner present, and 24.4% were households with a female householder and no spouse or partner present. About 29.6% of all households were made up of individuals and 10.8% had someone living alone who was 65 years of age or older.

There were 2,215 housing units, of which 12.1% were vacant. The homeowner vacancy rate was 3.2% and the rental vacancy rate was 8.2%.

Racial composition as of the 2020 census
Race	Number	Percent
White	4,126	85.7%
Black or African American	91	1.9%
American Indian and Alaska Native	29	0.6%
Asian	38	0.8%
Native Hawaiian and Other Pacific Islander	0	0.0%
Some other race	107	2.2%
Two or more races	426	8.8%
Hispanic or Latino (of any race)	353	7.3%
