= New Port Richey East, Florida =

- CDP
- Location in Pasco County and the state of Florida
- Coordinates: 28°15′06″N 82°41′34″W
- Country: United States
- State: Florida
- County: Pasco

Area
  - Total: 3.87 sq mi (10.02 km^{2})
  - Land: 3.80 sq mi (9.85 km^{2})
  - Water: 0.066 sq mi (0.17 km^{2})
- Elevation: 13 ft (4.0 m)

Population (2020)
  - Total: 11,015
  - Density: 2,895.6/sq mi (1,118.01/km^{2})
- Time zone: UTC-5 (Eastern (EST))
  - Summer (DST): UTC-4 (EDT)
- FIPS code: 12-48525
- GNIS feature ID: 2403333

New Port Richey East is an unincorporated census-designated place in Pasco County, Florida, United States adjacent to New Port Richey. As of the 2020 census, New Port Richey East had a population of 11,015.

== Geography ==
According to the United States Census Bureau, the community has a total area of 3.7 square miles (9.6 km^{2}), of which 3.6 square miles (9.3 km^{2}) is land and 0.1 square miles (0.26 km^{2}) (1.64%) is water.

== Demographics ==
Historical population
Census	Pop.	Note	%±
1970	2,758		—
1980	6,147		122.9%
1990	9,683		57.5%
2000	9,916		2.4%
2020	11,015		—

=== 2020 census ===
As of the 2020 census, New Port Richey East had a population of 11,015. The median age was 47.9 years. 16.1% of residents were under the age of 18 and 26.0% of residents were 65 years of age or older. For every 100 females there were 88.6 males, and for every 100 females age 18 and over there were 85.3 males age 18 and over.

100.0% of residents lived in urban areas, while 0.0% lived in rural areas.

There were 5,053 households in New Port Richey East, of which 19.6% had children under the age of 18 living in them. Of all households, 35.7% were married-couple households, 21.0% were households with a male householder and no spouse or partner present, and 33.8% were households with a female householder and no spouse or partner present. About 36.6% of all households were made up of individuals and 19.4% had someone living alone who was 65 years of age or older.

There were 5,580 housing units, of which 9.4% were vacant. The homeowner vacancy rate was 2.4% and the rental vacancy rate was 6.6%.

Racial composition as of the 2020 census
Race	Number	Percent
White	8,711	79.1%
Black or African American	432	3.9%
American Indian and Alaska Native	30	0.3%
Asian	145	1.3%
Native Hawaiian and Other Pacific Islander	14	0.1%
Some other race	447	4.1%
Two or more races	1,236	11.2%
Hispanic or Latino (of any race)	1,527	13.9%

=== 2000 census ===
As of the 2000 census, there were 9,916 people, 4,471 households, and 2,794 families residing in the community. The population density was 2,748.0 inhabitants per square mile (1,061.0/km^{2}). There were 5,001 housing units at an average density of 1,385.9 per square mile (535.1/km^{2}). The racial makeup of the community was 95.40% White, 1.04% African American, 0.22% Native American, 1.11% Asian, 0.03% Pacific Islander, 0.67% from other races, and 1.53% from two or more races. Hispanic or Latino of any race were 4.88% of the population.

There were 4,471 households, out of which 22.9% had children under the age of 18 living with them, 48.0% were married couples living together, 10.5% had a female householder with no husband present, and 37.5% were non-families. 31.4% of all households were made up of individuals, and 16.7% had someone living alone who was 65 years of age or older. The average household size was 2.20 and the average family size was 2.73.

In the community the population was spread out, with 19.8% under the age of 18, 6.9% from 18 to 24, 23.6% from 25 to 44, 22.7% from 45 to 64, and 27.1% who were 65 years of age or older. The median age was 45 years. For every 100 females, there were 89.6 males. For every 100 females age 18 and over, there were 87.1 males.

The median income for a household in the community was $30,178, and the median income for a family was $36,296. Males had a median income of $27,753 versus $23,191 for females. The per capita income for the community was $17,191. About 8.0% of families and 10.8% of the population were below the poverty line, including 14.1% of those under age 18 and 8.3% of those age 65 or over.
