= Keaton Beach, Florida =

Community in Florida, US

- Unincorporated community
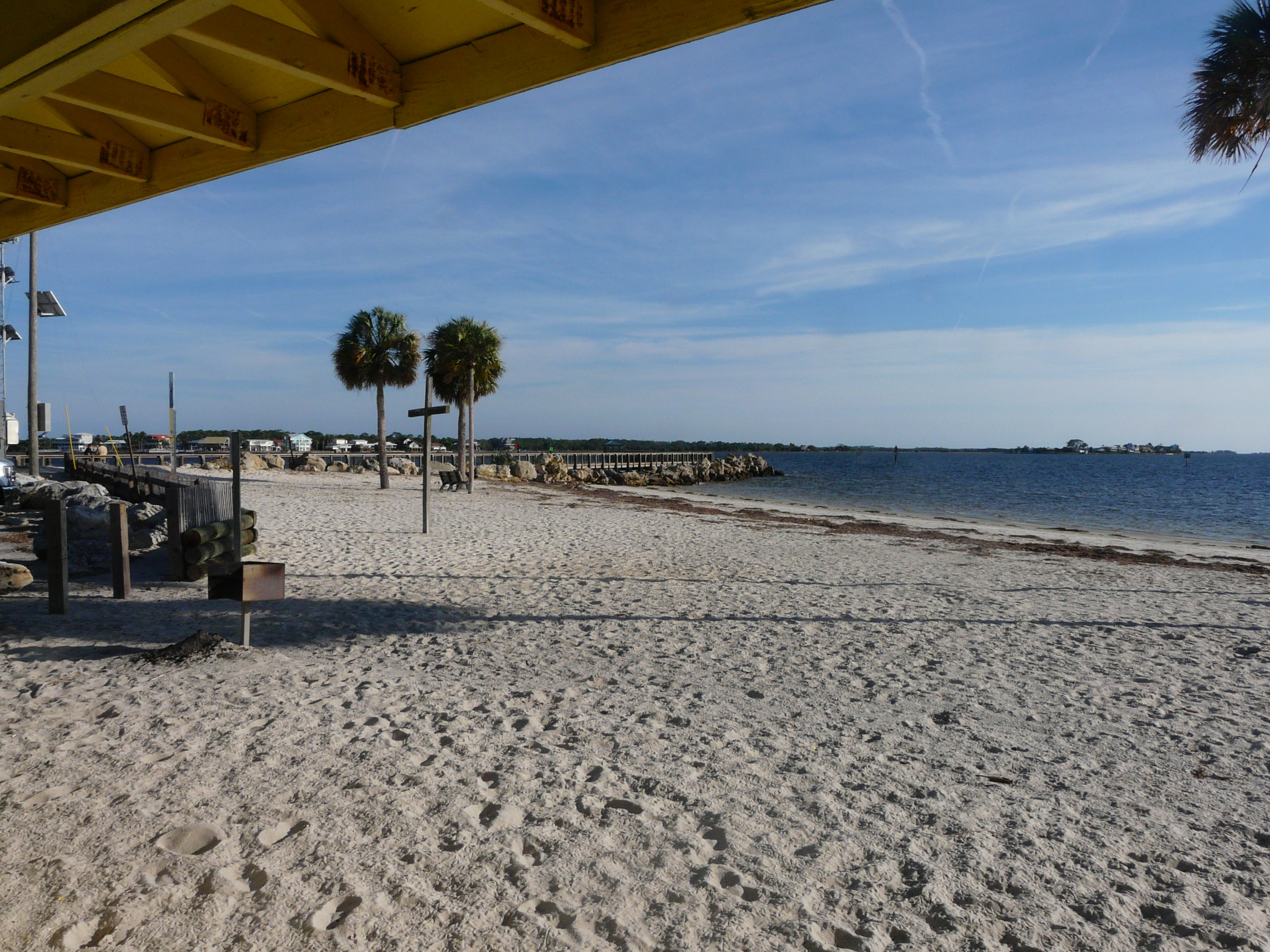
- Hodges Park in Keaton Beach
- Interactive map of Keaton Beach, Florida
- Coordinates: 29°49′28″N 83°35′42″W
- Country: United States
- State: Florida
- County: Taylor
- Time zone: UTC-5 (Eastern)
- Area codes: 850, 448

Keaton Beach is an unincorporated community on the Gulf coast in the southern part of Taylor County, Florida, United States. Keaton Beach is located 22.5 mi (36.2 km) south of the county seat of Perry.

== History ==
Named for Abb And Sam Keaton, Keaton Beach is believed to originally have been a cotton farming area, however over time industry shifted to focus on mullet fishing. In the early 1920s the Keaton brothers were joined by Captain W. Alston Brown, owner of the turpentine works at Blue Springs Creek; reportedly he was responsible for naming the area after the Keatons.

The community initially consisted of two houses, a church, commissary, and a sawmill; there were also several workers' houses along Blue Creek Spring. A pavilion was originally used as a place for the repair of mullet-fishing nets, however it evolved into use as a fish camp by day, and by night as a dance hall and restaurant.

In 1946, Clarence Kelly of Madison County, Florida, who had come to own a significant portion of Keaton Beach, sold the property to the Stephens family. Later 337 acres (136 ha) of property were sold to Keaton Beach, Inc. Today the majority of Keaton Beach is individual family residences.

== Geography ==
=== Weather ===
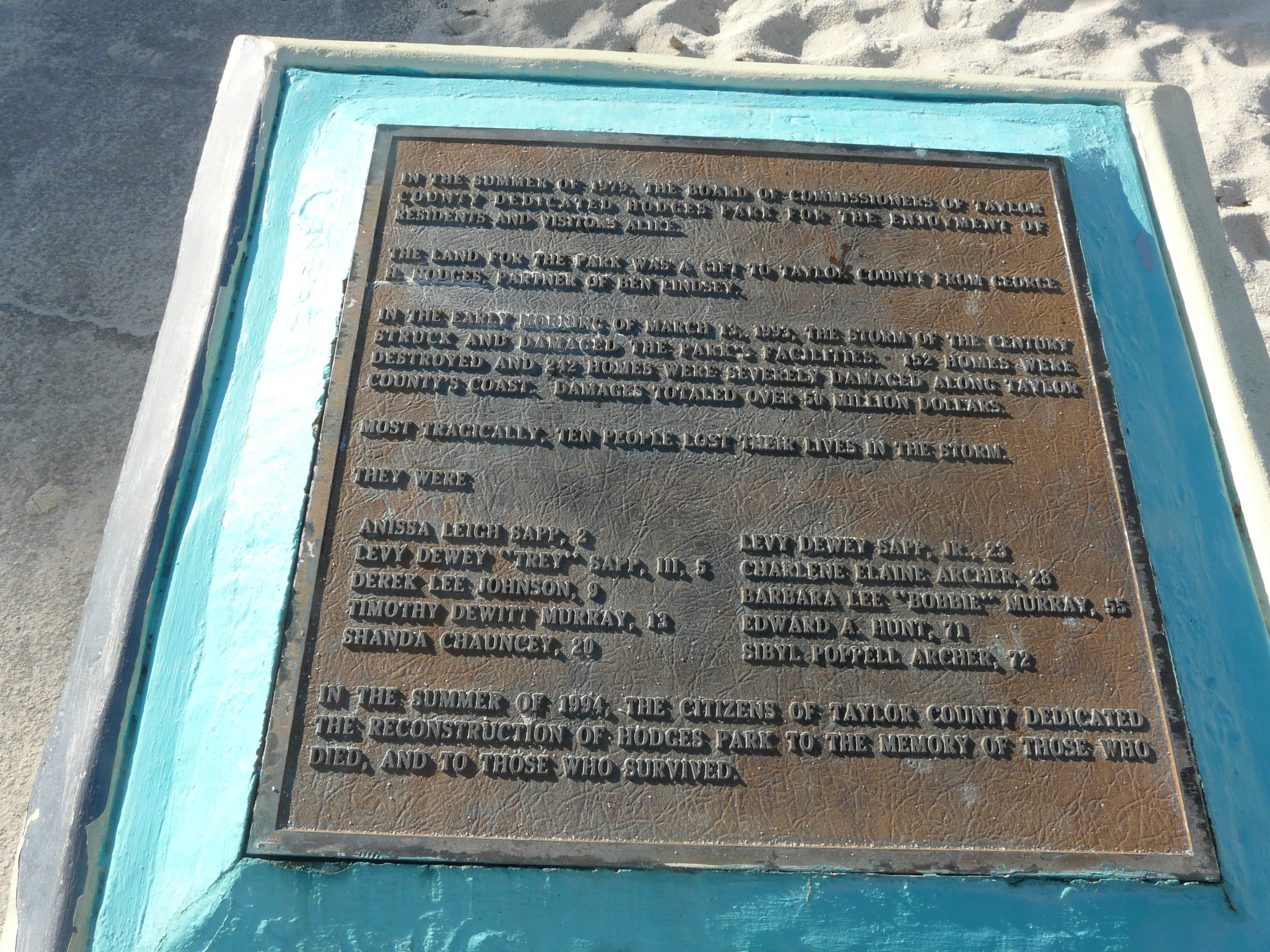
Sign at Hodges Park memorializing victims of the 1993 storm

Keaton and the surrounding beaches were devastated on March 13, 1993, when the "No Name Storm" (also known as "The Storm of the Century") battered the beach without warning early Saturday morning, killing several residents and visitors of neighboring Dekle Beach.

Hurricane Idalia made landfall near Keaton Beach around 7:45 a.m. on August 30, 2023.

Hurricane Helene swept through Keaton Beach on September 26, 2024. A day later, local officials estimated that 90% of homes in Keaton Beach were destroyed, marking a significant devastation of the community.

== Current development ==
Keaton Beach is home to Taylor County's primary public beach area, known as Hodges Park with a beach area, fishing pier, and play area. Keaton Beach is also the location of the county's primary public boat ramp, and is known as a prime location for summer scalloping.
