= Beacon Square, Florida =

- CDP
- Location in Pasco County and the state of Florida
- Coordinates: 28°12′45″N 82°44′52″W
- Country: United States
- State: Florida
- County: Pasco

Area
  - Total: 2.06 sq mi (5.33 km^{2})
  - Land: 2.02 sq mi (5.24 km^{2})
  - Water: 0.035 sq mi (0.09 km^{2})
- Elevation: 16 ft (4.9 m)

Population (2020)
  - Total: 8,320
  - Density: 4,112.5/sq mi (1,587.86/km^{2})
- Time zone: UTC-5 (Eastern (EST))
  - Summer (DST): UTC-4 (EDT)
- FIPS code: 12-04650
- GNIS feature ID: 2402674

Beacon Square is a census-designated place (CDP) in Pasco County, Florida, United States. As of the 2020 census, Beacon Square had a population of 8,320.

== Geography ==
According to the United States Census Bureau, the CDP has a total area of 2.0 square miles (5.2 km^{2}), of which 2.0 square miles (5.2 km^{2}) is land and 0.04 square miles (0.10 km^{2}) (1.96%) is water.

Beacon Square is a subdivision located on the west side of U.S. Highway 19 in Holiday, zip code 34691.

== Demographics ==
Historical population
| Census | Pop. | Note | %± |
|---|---|---|---|
| 1970 | 2,927 | | — |
| 1980 | 6,513 | | 122.5% |
| 1990 | 6,265 | | −3.8% |
| 2000 | 7,263 | | 15.9% |
| 2020 | 8,320 | | — |

=== 2020 census ===
As of the 2020 census, Beacon Square had a population of 8,320. The median age was 44.5 years. 19.6% of residents were under the age of 18 and 22.0% of residents were 65 years of age or older. For every 100 females there were 97.4 males, and for every 100 females age 18 and over there were 95.4 males age 18 and over.

100.0% of residents lived in urban areas, while 0.0% lived in rural areas.

There were 3,599 households in Beacon Square, of which 23.6% had children under the age of 18 living in them. Of all households, 37.2% were married-couple households, 21.5% were households with a male householder and no spouse or partner present, and 29.8% were households with a female householder and no spouse or partner present. About 32.3% of all households were made up of individuals and 17.2% had someone living alone who was 65 years of age or older.

There were 4,208 housing units, of which 14.5% were vacant. The homeowner vacancy rate was 3.7% and the rental vacancy rate was 9.9%.

Racial composition as of the 2020 census
| Race | Number | Percent |
|---|---|---|
| White | 6,432 | 77.3% |
| Black or African American | 506 | 6.1% |
| American Indian and Alaska Native | 34 | 0.4% |
| Asian | 159 | 1.9% |
| Native Hawaiian and Other Pacific Islander | 5 | 0.1% |
| Some other race | 353 | 4.2% |
| Two or more races | 831 | 10.0% |
| Hispanic or Latino (of any race) | 1,217 | 14.6% |

=== 2000 census ===
As of the 2000 census, there were 7,263 people, 3,509 households, and 2,084 families residing in the CDP. The population density was 3,633.4 inhabitants per square mile (1,402.9/km^{2}). There were 4,119 housing units at an average density of 2,060.6 per square mile (795.6/km^{2}). The racial makeup of the CDP was 95.32% White, 1.03% African American, 0.34% Native American, 0.81% Asian, 1.09% from other races, and 1.40% from two or more races. Hispanic or Latino of any race were 3.84% of the population.

There were 3,509 households, out of which 17.8% had children under the age of 18 living with them, 46.6% were married couples living together, 9.3% had a female householder with no husband present, and 40.6% were non-families. 34.5% of all households were made up of individuals, and 23.2% had someone living alone who was 65 years of age or older. The average household size was 2.07 and the average family size was 2.61.

In the CDP, the population was spread out, with 16.4% under the age of 18, 5.2% from 18 to 24, 22.1% from 25 to 44, 21.0% from 45 to 64, and 35.3% who were 65 years of age or older. The median age was 51 years. For every 100 females, there were 83.6 males. For every 100 females age 18 and over, there were 80.4 males.

The median income for a household in the CDP was $27,528, and the median income for a family was $33,125. Males had a median income of $27,220 versus $21,792 for females. The per capita income for the CDP was $16,913. About 8.1% of families and 9.5% of the population were below the poverty line, including 18.6% of those under age 18 and 8.3% of those age 65 or over.
