= Heritage Pines, Florida =

- Unincorporated community
- Location within Florida Location within the United States
- Coordinates: 28°25′36″N 82°37′24″W
- Country: United States
- State: Florida
- County: Pasco

Area
  - Total: 1.095 sq mi (2.84 km^{2})
  - Land: 1.072 sq mi (2.78 km^{2})
  - Water: 0.023 sq mi (0.060 km^{2})
- Elevation: 30 ft (9.1 m)

Population (2010)
  - Total: 2,136
  - Density: 1,993/sq mi (769.3/km^{2})
- Time zone: UTC-5 (Eastern (EST))
  - Summer (DST): UTC-4 (EDT)
- ZIP code: 34667
- Area code: 352
- GNIS feature ID: 2583352

Heritage Pines is an unincorporated community and census-designated place in Pasco County, Florida, United States. As of the 2020 census, Heritage Pines had a population of 2,171.

== Geography ==
According to the U.S. Census Bureau, the community has an area of 1.095 square miles (2.84 km^{2}); 1.072 square miles (2.78 km^{2}) of its area is land, and 0.023 square miles (0.060 km^{2}) is water.

== Demographics ==
Heritage Pines first appeared as a census designated place in the 2010 U.S. census.

=== 2020 census ===
As of the 2020 census, Heritage Pines had a population of 2,171. The median age was 74.4 years. 0.4% of residents were under the age of 18 and 85.8% of residents were 65 years of age or older. For every 100 females there were 83.2 males, and for every 100 females age 18 and over there were 83.5 males age 18 and over.

100.0% of residents lived in urban areas, while 0.0% lived in rural areas.

There were 1,292 households in Heritage Pines, of which 2.9% had children under the age of 18 living in them. Of all households, 56.5% were married-couple households, 12.2% were households with a male householder and no spouse or partner present, and 28.2% were households with a female householder and no spouse or partner present. About 34.6% of all households were made up of individuals and 30.1% had someone living alone who was 65 years of age or older.

There were 1,413 housing units, of which 8.6% were vacant. The homeowner vacancy rate was 2.1% and the rental vacancy rate was 6.7%.

Racial composition as of the 2020 census
Race	Number	Percent
White	2,052	94.5%
Black or African American	16	0.7%
American Indian and Alaska Native	3	0.1%
Asian	15	0.7%
Native Hawaiian and Other Pacific Islander	0	0.0%
Some other race	14	0.6%
Two or more races	71	3.3%
Hispanic or Latino (of any race)	60	2.8%
