= Meadow Oaks, Florida =

- Unincorporated community
- Coordinates: 28°20′47″N 82°36′09″W
- Country: United States
- State: Florida
- County: Pasco

Area
  - Total: 1.656 sq mi (4.29 km^{2})
  - Land: 1.651 sq mi (4.28 km^{2})
  - Water: 0.005 sq mi (0.013 km^{2})
- Elevation: 36 ft (11 m)

Population (2020)
  - Total: 2,842
  - Density: 1,721/sq mi (664.6/km^{2})
- Time zone: UTC-5 (Eastern (EST))
  - Summer (DST): UTC-4 (EDT)
- ZIP Code: 34669
- Area code: 352
- GNIS feature ID: 2583362

Meadow Oaks is an unincorporated community and census-designated place (CDP) in Pasco County, Florida, United States. Located north of Florida State Road 52 inland from Hudson, it is within the Tampa–St. Petersburg–Clearwater Metropolitan Statistical Area (MSA) and the Southwest Florida Water Management District.

The community was first planned in 1983 to include homes and eponymous golf course, which was later expanded. The clubhouse was destroyed by fire in 1995. The community continued to grow into the 2000s, partly on land that had once been a cattle ranch, to have eight 'villages'.

Meadow Oaks become a CDP (43785) in 2010.

== Geography ==
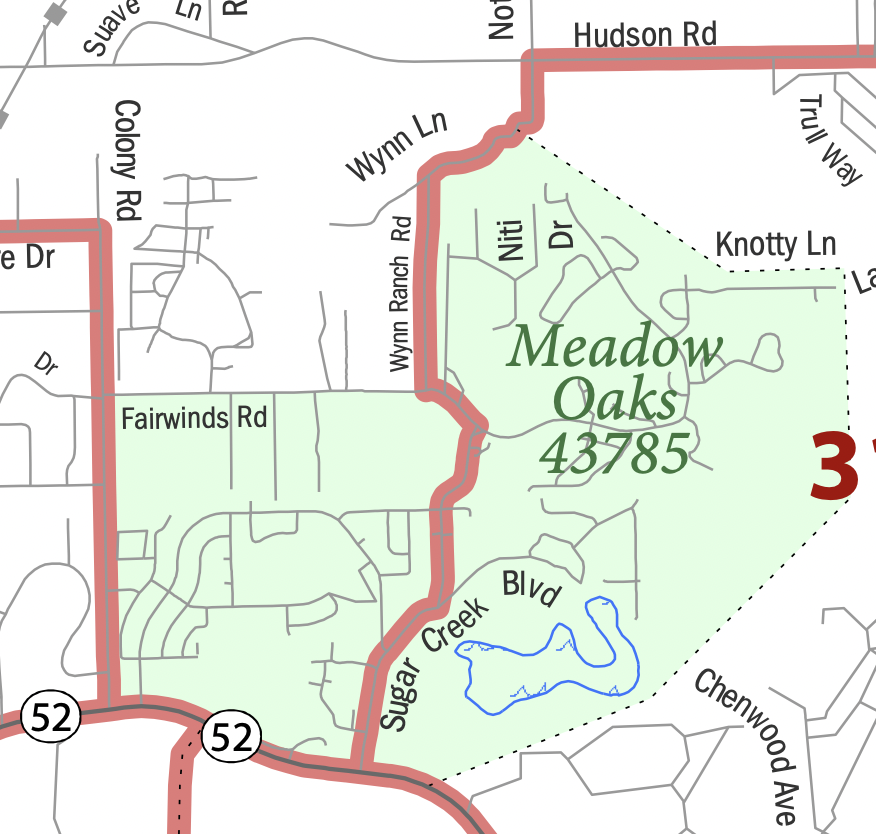

Meadow Oaks is considered an 'inland' or 'landside' Pasco County community. According to the U.S. Census Bureau, Meadow Oaks CDP has an area of 1.656 square miles (4.29 km^{2}); 1.651 square miles (4.28 km^{2}) of its area is land, and 0.005 square miles (0.013 km^{2}) is water. Land-use planning follows the concepts of MPUD zoning.

== Demographics ==
Meadow Oaks first appeared as a census designated place in the 2010 U.S. census.

=== 2020 census ===
As of the 2020 census, Meadow Oaks had a population of 2,842. The median age was 50.6 years. 17.2% of residents were under the age of 18 and 29.4% of residents were 65 years of age or older. For every 100 females there were 92.5 males, and for every 100 females age 18 and over there were 89.5 males age 18 and over.

100.0% of residents lived in urban areas, while 0.0% lived in rural areas.

There were 1,227 households in Meadow Oaks, of which 23.0% had children under the age of 18 living in them. Of all households, 45.8% were married-couple households, 16.7% were households with a male householder and no spouse or partner present, and 29.5% were households with a female householder and no spouse or partner present. About 27.8% of all households were made up of individuals and 16.4% had someone living alone who was 65 years of age or older.

There were 1,336 housing units, of which 8.2% were vacant. The homeowner vacancy rate was 1.3% and the rental vacancy rate was 6.1%.

Racial composition as of the 2020 census
Race	Number	Percent
White	2,304	81.1%
Black or African American	116	4.1%
American Indian and Alaska Native	5	0.2%
Asian	31	1.1%
Native Hawaiian and Other Pacific Islander	2	0.1%
Some other race	93	3.3%
Two or more races	291	10.2%
Hispanic or Latino (of any race)	345	12.1%

=== 2010 census ===
As of the 2010 census, the population was 2,442.

== See also ==
- List of census-designated places in Florida
