= Jasmine Estates, Florida =

- CDP
- Location in Pasco County and the state of Florida
- Coordinates: 28°17′35″N 82°41′27″W
- Country: United States
- State: Florida
- County: Pasco

Area
  - Total: 3.68 sq mi (9.54 km^{2})
  - Land: 3.63 sq mi (9.40 km^{2})
  - Water: 0.050 sq mi (0.13 km^{2})
- Elevation: 16 ft (4.9 m)

Population (2020)
  - Total: 21,525
  - Density: 5,928.8/sq mi (2,289.14/km^{2})
- Time zone: UTC-5 (Eastern (EST))
  - Summer (DST): UTC-4 (EDT)
- FIPS code: 12-35350
- GNIS feature ID: 2402631

Jasmine Estates is a census-designated place (CDP) in Pasco County, Florida, United States. As of the 2020 census, Jasmine Estates had a population of 21,525.

== Geography ==
According to the United States Census Bureau, the CDP has a total area of 3.6 square miles (9.3 km^{2}), of which 3.6 square miles (9.3 km^{2}) is land and 0.1 square miles (0.26 km^{2}) (1.65%) is water.

== Demographics ==
Historical population
Census	Pop.	Note	%±
1970	2,967		—
1980	11,995		304.3%
1990	17,136		42.9%
2000	18,213		6.3%
2010	18,989		4.3%
2020	21,525		13.4%

=== 2020 census ===
As of the 2020 census, Jasmine Estates had a population of 21,525. The median age was 40.2 years. 22.0% of residents were under the age of 18 and 17.6% of residents were 65 years of age or older. For every 100 females there were 92.2 males, and for every 100 females age 18 and over there were 89.0 males age 18 and over.

100.0% of residents lived in urban areas, while 0.0% lived in rural areas.

There were 8,493 households in Jasmine Estates, of which 29.4% had children under the age of 18 living in them. Of all households, 35.9% were married-couple households, 20.5% were households with a male householder and no spouse or partner present, and 31.4% were households with a female householder and no spouse or partner present. About 27.8% of all households were made up of individuals and 12.9% had someone living alone who was 65 years of age or older.

There were 9,212 housing units, of which 7.8% were vacant. The homeowner vacancy rate was 2.5% and the rental vacancy rate was 6.2%.

Racial composition as of the 2020 census
Race	Number	Percent
White	15,258	70.9%
Black or African American	1,383	6.4%
American Indian and Alaska Native	132	0.6%
Asian	281	1.3%
Native Hawaiian and Other Pacific Islander	22	0.1%
Some other race	1,456	6.8%
Two or more races	2,993	13.9%
Hispanic or Latino (of any race)	4,674	21.7%

=== 2000 census ===
As of the 2000 United States census, there were 18,213 people, 8,361 households, and 5,275 families residing in the CDP. The population density was 5,096.5 inhabitants per square mile (1,967.8/km^{2}). There were 9,289 housing units at an average density of 2,599.3 per square mile (1,003.6/km^{2}). The racial makeup of the CDP was 94.46% White, 1.63% African American, 0.32% Native American, 0.88% Asian, 0.02% Pacific Islander, 1.21% from other races, and 1.49% from two or more races. Hispanic or Latino of any race were 6.07% of the population.

There were 8,361 households, out of which 21.3% had children under the age of 18 living with them, 47.4% were married couples living together, 11.4% had a female householder with no husband present, and 36.9% were non-families. 31.4% of all households were made up of individuals, and 20.4% had someone living alone who was 65 years of age or older. The average household size was 2.18 and the average family size was 2.67.

In the CDP, the population was spread out, with 19.1% under the age of 18, 6.2% from 18 to 24, 23.6% from 25 to 44, 20.6% from 45 to 64, and 30.4% who were 65 years of age or older. The median age was 46 years. For every 100 females, there were 86.0 males. For every 100 females age 18 and over, there were 83.2 males.

The median income for a household in the CDP was $26,935, and the median income for a family was $31,584. Males had a median income of $26,077 versus $21,906 for females. The per capita income for the CDP was $14,867. About 12.0% of families and 14.3% of the population were below the poverty line, including 24.8% of those under age 18 and 9.0% of those age 65 or over.
