= Key Vista, Florida =

- Unincorporated community
- Location within Florida Location within the United States
- Coordinates: 28°11′41″N 82°46′13″W
- Country: United States
- State: Florida
- County: Pasco

Area
  - Total: 0.755 sq mi (1.96 km^{2})
  - Land: 0.755 sq mi (1.96 km^{2})
  - Water: 0 sq mi (0 km^{2})
- Elevation: 10 ft (3.0 m)

Population (2010)
  - Total: 1,757
  - Density: 2,330/sq mi (899/km^{2})
- Time zone: UTC-5 (Eastern (EST))
  - Summer (DST): UTC-4 (EDT)
- ZIP code: 34691
- Area code: 352
- GNIS feature ID: 2583357

Key Vista is an unincorporated community and census-designated place in Pasco County, Florida, United States. As of the 2020 census, Key Vista had a population of 1,680.

== Geography ==
According to the U.S. Census Bureau, the community has an area of 0.755 square miles (1.96 km^{2}), all of it land.

== Demographics ==
Key Vista first appeared as a census designated place in the 2010 U.S. census.

=== 2020 census ===
As of the 2020 census, Key Vista had a population of 1,680. The median age was 51.8 years. 18.1% of residents were under the age of 18 and 27.3% of residents were 65 years of age or older. For every 100 females there were 94.0 males, and for every 100 females age 18 and over there were 89.3 males age 18 and over.

100.0% of residents lived in urban areas, while 0.0% lived in rural areas.

There were 657 households in Key Vista, of which 22.8% had children under the age of 18 living in them. Of all households, 66.7% were married-couple households, 11.6% were households with a male householder and no spouse or partner present, and 15.7% were households with a female householder and no spouse or partner present. About 21.4% of all households were made up of individuals and 14.3% had someone living alone who was 65 years of age or older.

There were 717 housing units, of which 8.4% were vacant. The homeowner vacancy rate was 4.3% and the rental vacancy rate was 1.8%.

Racial composition as of the 2020 census
Race	Number	Percent
White	1,352	80.5%
Black or African American	44	2.6%
American Indian and Alaska Native	8	0.5%
Asian	80	4.8%
Native Hawaiian and Other Pacific Islander	0	0.0%
Some other race	59	3.5%
Two or more races	137	8.2%
Hispanic or Latino (of any race)	147	8.8%
