= Horseshoe Beach, Florida =

Town in the state of Florida, United States

- Town
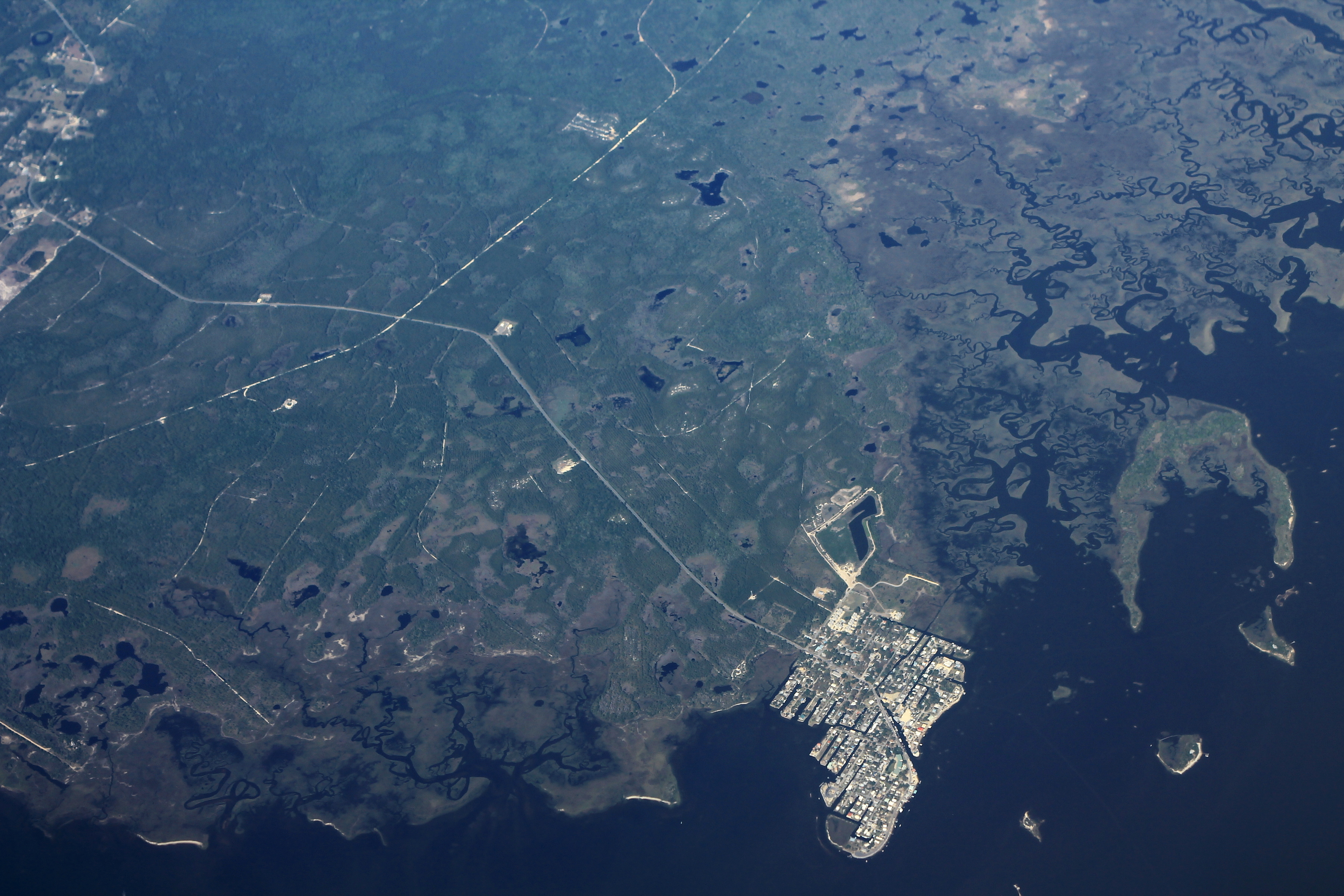
- Aerial photo of Horseshoe Beach

- Location in Dixie County and the state of Florida
- Coordinates: 29°26′26″N 83°17′17″W
- Country: United States
- State: Florida
- County: Dixie
- Settled (Butler Settlement): c. 1820s-1890s
- Settled (Shelton): 1910
- Settled (Horseshoe): 1935-1948
- Incorporated (Town of Horseshoe Beach): May 28, 1963

Government
  - Type: Mayor-Council
  - Mayor: Jeffrey "Jeff" Williams
  - Councilmembers: Bryan Dodd, Brooke Hiers, James "JD" Nobles, and Brett Selph
  - Town Clerk: Nicole "Nikki" Selph
  - Town Attorney: Conrad Bishop Jr.

Area
  - Total: 0.52 sq mi (1.34 km^{2})
  - Land: 0.47 sq mi (1.21 km^{2})
  - Water: 0.046 sq mi (0.12 km^{2})
- Elevation: 7 ft (2.1 m)

Population (2020)
  - Total: 165
  - Density: 352.0/sq mi (135.89/km^{2})
- Time zone: UTC-5 (Eastern (EST))
  - Summer (DST): UTC-4 (EDT)
- ZIP code: 32648
- Area code: 352
- FIPS code: 12-32650
- GNIS feature ID: 2405866
- Website: www.townofhorseshoebeachfl.com

Horseshoe Beach is a town in southern Dixie County, Florida, United States. The town is part of Big Bend and the Nature Coast in North Florida, along the Gulf of Mexico. The population was 165 at the 2020 census.

== Geography ==
The approximate coordinates for the Town of Horseshoe Beach is located in southern Dixie County on the Gulf of Mexico. County Road 351 is the only highway into the town; it leads 19 miles (31 km) northeast to Cross City, the Dixie County seat.

According to the United States Census Bureau, the town of Horseshoe Beach has a total area of 0.48 square miles (1.25 km^{2}), of which 0.45 square miles (1.17 km^{2}) is land and 0.03 square miles (0.08 km^{2}), or 6.63%, is water.

=== Climate ===
The climate in this area is characterized by hot, humid summers and generally mild winters. According to the Köppen climate classification, the Town of Horseshoe Beach has a humid subtropical climate zone (Cfa).

== Demographics ==
Historical population
Census	Pop.	Note	%±
1970	124		—
1980	304		145.2%
1990	252		−17.1%
2000	206		−18.3%
2010	169		−18.0%
2020	165		−2.4%
U.S. Decennial Census

=== 2010 and 2020 census ===
Horseshoe Beach racial composition (Hispanics excluded from racial categories) (NH = Non-Hispanic)
Race	Pop 2010	Pop 2020	% 2010	% 2020
White (NH)	167	144	98.82%	87.27%
Black or African American (NH)	0	1	0.00%	0.61%
Native American or Alaska Native (NH)	0	1	0.00%	0.61%
Asian (NH)	0	2	0.00%	1.21%
Pacific Islander or Native Hawaiian (NH)	0	0	0.00%	0.00%
Some other race (NH)	0	0	0.00%	0.00%
Two or more races/Multiracial (NH)	0	6	0.00%	3.64%
Hispanic or Latino (any race)	2	11	1.18%	6.67%
Total	169	165		

As of the 2020 United States census, there were 165 people, 49 households, and 30 families residing in the town.

As of the 2010 United States census, there were 169 people, 57 households, and 44 families residing in the town.

==== 2010 Ancestry ====
As of 2010, the largest self-reported ancestry groups in Horseshoe Beach, Florida are:

Largest ancestries (2010)	Percent
English	28.7%
Italian	17.9%
Scots-Irish	10.3%
Greek	9.7%
Irish	4.1%

=== 2000 census ===
As of the census of 2000, there were 206 people, 84 households, and 59 families residing in the town. The population density was 1,014.1 inhabitants per square mile (391.5/km^{2}). There were 301 housing units at an average density of 1,481.7 per square mile (572.1/km^{2}). The racial makeup of the town was 95.63% White and 4.37% African American. Hispanic or Latino of any race were 0.49% of the population.

In 2000, there were 84 households, out of which 22.6% had children under the age of 18 living with them, 56.0% were married couples living together, 8.3% had a female householder with no husband present, and 28.6% were non-families. 25.0% of all households were made up of individuals, and 17.9% had someone living alone who was 65 years of age or older. The average household size was 2.45 and the average family size was 2.88.

In 2000, in the town, the population was spread out, with 24.3% under the age of 18, 6.3% from 18 to 24, 14.6% from 25 to 44, 27.2% from 45 to 64, and 27.7% who were 65 years of age or older. The median age was 47 years. For every 100 females, there were 85.6 males. For every 100 females age 18 and over, there were 92.6 males.

In 2000, the median income for a household in the town was $33,750, and the median income for a family was $46,875. Males had a median income of $29,286 versus $25,313 for females. The per capita income for the town was $16,535. About 17.2% of families and 22.3% of the population were below the poverty line, including 39.6% of those under the age of eighteen and 18.2% of those 65 or over.
