= List of county roads in Pasco County, Florida =

- County road shields used in Florida

Highway names
- Interstates: Interstate X (I-X)
- US Highways: U.S. Highway X (US X)
- State: State Road X (SR X)
- County: County Road X (CR X)

System links
- County roads in Florida; County roads in Pasco County

The following is a list of county roads in Pasco County, Florida. All county roads are maintained by the county in which they reside.

== County Road 1 ==
Little Road
- Location: Trinity-near Aripeka

County Road 1 is a major south to north county road within western Pasco County, known as "Little Road." It runs entirely as a divided highway from CR 996 (Trinity Boulevard) in Trinity to US 19 south of Aripeka. It also included Fivay Road until 2000.

=== Route description ===
The route begins at Trinity Boulevard (signed in Pinellas County as CR 996) in Trinity across from the entrance to "The Villages at Fox Hollow" known as Robert Trent Jones Parkway. It runs as a four-lane divided highway as it intersections Mitchell Boulevard and the future Starkey Boulevard Extension.

The road widens from four to six lanes just before the intersection with Florida State Road 54 in the Seven Springs area, the northeast corner of which used to be part of SR 54, and overlapped CR 1 itself north of there. Along the way it runs along the western side of Seven Springs Villas Association, which includes the Seven Springs Golf and Country Club before running a bridge over the Anclote River.

North of "Old CR 54," the road narrows back down to four lanes. The road runs past shopping centers serving communities such as Cypress Lakes and Heritage Lake then takes a northwest curve before the intersection with Trouble Creek Road (PCR 518) and River Crossing Boulevard. It enters through some natural surroundings where it crosses a pair of bridges over the Pithlachascotee River, then curves back to the north again before the intersection with Plathe Road.

The road widens back to six lanes just south of the intersection with Massachusetts Avenue and De Cubellis Road (both CR 587), and from there the route is overlapped by CR Truck 587, Along the way it passes a series of Pasco County Government buildings.

The road makes another slight reverse curve before the intersection with Pasco CR 524 (Ridge Road), where CR Truck 587 turns east. North of there the road runs through more suburban neighborhoods and later crosses a pair of bridges over Bear Creek just south of Florida State Road 52. The road narrows back down to four lanes just before the intersection with Fivay Road, which until the year 2000 was part of CR 1. From there the road curves to the northeast and then north before the intersection with Hudson Avenue. The road curves back the east again, and then to the north just before the intersection with New York Avenue.

The penultimate intersection is with Fulton Avenue and Diagonal Road, the latter of which is a former branch of the Silver Springs, Ocala and Gulf Railroad. North of there, the road curves to the northwest and ends at US 19, across the street from an industrial area.

== County Road 35 Alternate ==
Berry Road Melrose Avenue Old Lakeland Highway
- Location: Branchborough-Dade City

County Road 35 Alternate is the bannered route of SR 35 (hidden routes for US 98 and US 301) in the southeastern Pasco County. It was formerly designated as SR 35A.

The route begins on Berry Boulevard at County Road 54 in Branchborough just west of the Hillsborough River, and curves to the west onto Melrose Avenue where it approaches Vitis, where CSX's Yeoman Subdivision and Vitis Subdivision merge into the Wildwood Subdivision. The route then turns right onto the Zephyrhills Bypass (CR 535). From there it is named Old Lakeland Highway and follows the west side of the Wildwood Subdivision past an unnumbered interchange with US 98 near Ellerslie, and eventually terminates at US 98/301 in Dade City. Since turns are restricted at this north end, Dick Jarrett Way provides several movements.

== County Road 41 ==
County Road 41
- Location: Zephyrhills-Jessamine

County Road 41 is a county extension of Florida State Road 41. It runs from Zephyrhills through Dade City as Fort King Road, then becomes South 17th Street until the intersection with CR 52, where it turns west in a concurrency for a few blocks, then turns right onto North 21st Street, where it immediately joins a hidden concurrency with Pasco CR 578 at St. Joe Road across from Suwannee Way. At the intersection with Lock Street, unmarked CR 578 turns east while CR 41 turns west onto Blanton Road. The route makes a sharp curve to the north in front of the Pasco-Hernando State College East Campus, and spends the rest of its journey meandering along the hills of northwestern Dade City, and northeastern Pasco County.

Along these hills it encounters the southern terminus of County Road 41 Alternate (Spring Valley Drive), which is almost directly across from Frazee Hill Road. While descending from this intersection and passing only one dead end street on the left side, it makes a sharp curve to the west as its northbound trajectory is replaced by Parrish Grove Road, all while climbing another hill. At a residential area along a parallel driveway, it curves to the northwest. Shortly after the right-of-way of the former Orange Belt Railway in the barely existing community of Blanton, the road encounters the shared northern terminus of County Road 41 Alternate as well as the southern terminus of County Road 575, then turns directly west again.

In another barely recognizable unincorporated community named Jessamine, it intersects the eastern terminus of James Road before descending towards a short causeway along the southern banks of Jessamine Lake with the wetlands to the south. The road briefly curves to the northwest and then turns west again before the intersection with the western terminus of James Road and southern terminus of McCann Lane. At the interchange with Interstate 75 in Florida (Exit 293), CR 41 becomes a two-lane divided highway, but only at the vicinity of the quarter-cloverleaf on and off ramps. The route then descends and quickly climbs one other hill just as it takes a sharp right curve before the intersection at Pasco CR 577 (Lake Iola Road), near an orange grove. North of there the route takes over the Lake Iola Road street name. Along the way it passes through farm fields and mostly privately owned dead end streets. Pasco County Road 41 and Lake Iola Road terminates at the intersection with Dan Brown Hill Road on the Pasco-Hernando County Line, and Lake Iola Road becomes Spring Lake Highway, while CR 41 becomes Hernando County Road 541.

=== County Road 41 Alternate ===
County Road 41 Alternate
- Location: Dade City-Blanton

County Road 41 Alternate is the bannered route of CR 41 in the northwestern outskirts of Dade City. It was originally a suffixed alternate of State Road 35 called County Road 35B, and included Frazee Hill Road.

== County Road 52 ==
County Road 52
- Location: Pasco-Dade City

County Road 52 is a former segment of Florida State Road 52. It runs west to east along Schrader Memorial Highway from SR 52 in Pasco to US 98-301 in Dade City. The route was created in February 2023 when SR 52 was relocated onto a new bypass from Pasco to Dade City. This route runs south and east of downtown San Antonio, Florida and through St. Leo, Florida including along the border of Saint Leo University. West of the western terminus of SR 52 at US 19, a local extension of SR 52 is named "CR 52," but is not officially marked as a county road.

=== County Road 52 Alternate ===
Clinton Avenue
- Location: Southeast of Dade City

County Road 52 Alternate is a county bannered route of Florida State Road 52. It originally ran west to east along Clinton Avenue from CR 579 in St. Leo to CR 35 Alt. Southeast of Dade City, but was truncated to US 98/301 when SR 52 was realigned in February 2023.

The route was former designated as SR 52A In February 2023, the segment west of US 98/301 was redesignated as part of the SR 52 bypass south of San Antonio and Saint Leo.

== County Road 54 ==
County Road 54
- Location: Wesley Chapel-Wesley Chapel; Zephyrhills-Branchborough

County Road 54 is both a pair of county-maintained former sections of and a county extension of Florida State Road 54.

=== Route description ===
GIS data shows the first CR 54 on old SR 54 west of CR 1 in the Seven Springs area. It was created after the realignment of SR 54 between east of the Millpond Estates Community to County Road 1. The route is unsigned.

The second segment is Wesley Chapel Boulevard which is marked from west to east from the intersection of SR 54 & SR 56 continuing north and then east along the former route of SR 54. The road continues east until it reaches the intersection of CR 54 & CR 579 where it splits into two segments bearing the same designation.

The eastbound segment continues until it reaches US 301 in downtown Zephyrhills, where it ends.

The northbound segment of Eiland Boulevard is an overlap with CR 579. In the Lake Bernadette-Ten Oaks communities west of Zephyrhills. CR 579 branches off to the north as Handcart Road, while Eiland Boulevard makes a sharp curve to the east. This region has been intended as the eastern terminus of the proposed West Zephyrhills Bypass. After the gateway to the Silver Oaks neighborhood, CR 54 makes a sharp curve to the left then the right just before the intersection of CR 41, and immediately after this, encounters the intersection with US 301. Beyond US 301, CR 54 has an intersection with Wire Road and 12th Street, the latter of which is a former SR 54.

CR ALT 54 on the west side of the CSX Wildwood Subdivision crossing, then intersects CR 535 where Chancey Road (south) becomes Old Lakeland Highway (north). East of CR 535, the route takes a slight curve to the northeast as it passes Forest Lake Estates, a mobile home park on the south side just before the CSX Vitis Subdivision crossing. Immediately after the crossing, the route passes through the Upper Hillsborough Wildlife Management Area. The road curves back to straight east before the intersection with CR ALT 35 (Berry Road), and then runs towards the bridge over the Hillsborough River.

Upon leaving the protected wetlands surrounding the Hillsborough River, CR 54 runs along the Pasco-Polk County Line, and passes through some local ranch land before finally terminating at US 98 (hidden SR 35) in Branchborough.

=== County Road 54 Alternate ===
County Road 54 Alternate
- Location: Zephyrhills-Branchborough

County Road 54 is both a pair of county-maintained former sections of and a county extension of Florida State Road 54. The route begins on Forbes Road at the northwest corner of CR 54 and the crossing of the CSX Wildwood Subdivision, but heads straight north, unlike the railroad line which runs southwest to northeast. The route turns east at a wye intersection onto Lynbrook Drive which crosses the Wildwood Subdivision. The first major intersection is at CR 535 (Old Lakeland Highway). From there it continues as a two-lane undivided rural road. Before Forbes Road becomes a dead end street, CR 54A turns north again onto Elwood Road, a street that runs straight south and north.

Elwood Road curves to the northeast before encountering the CSX Vitis Subdivision crossing, then changes its name to Merrick Road. After passing the intersection with Bayles Road and the Victorious Church of God in Christ, the road turns straight west and east. CR 54A ends at CR 35A (Berry Road). It's possible that at one time the route turned southeast and overlapped CR 35A to the southern terminus with CR 54 near US 98.

== County Road 77 ==
County Road 77
- Location: Trinity-Jasmine Estates

County Road 77 is Seven Springs Boulevard, Rowan Road, and Regency Park Boulevard.

== County Road 516 ==
Voorhees Road Cecelia Drive Baille Drive
- Location: South of New Port Richey-New Port Richey

County Road 516 includes Voorhees Road, Cecelia Drive, and Baille Drive. The route was a former segment of Florida State Road 518.

== County Road 518 ==
Trouble Creek Road
- Location: Southwest of New Port Richey-New Port Richey

County Road 518 is Trouble Creek Road in and around New Port Richey. The route was also a former segment of Florida State Road 518.

== County Road 524 ==
County Road 524
- Location: Port Richey-Connerton

County Road 524 is Ridge Road. It runs west to east, 13.65 miles, from US 19 in Port Richey to US-41 In Land O' Lakes. It was originally part of former SR 587 east of Little Road (CR 1) and SR 587A west of Little Road.

== County Road 530 ==
Otis Allen Road Kossik Road
- Location: North of Zephyrhills-Vitis

County Road 530 is a west-east route that currently exists in two segments The original segment consists of Otis Allen Road between Wire Road and CR 535 (Old Lakeland Highway) near Vitis Junction. At one time it may have even included Wire Road north of Otis Allen Road to US 301. This segment was formerly SR 530

The second segment is known as Kossik Road a westward extension planned, part of which already exists at the Lowe's on US 301. Kossik Road is still planned to be extended east to Wire Road at the intersection with Otis Allen Road and west from Green Slope Drive. The ultimate goal of the Pasco County Planning Department has always been to extend the route into Overpass Road.

== County Road 535 ==
Chancey Road Old Lakeland Highway
- Location: Zephyrhills-Vitis

County Road 535 is an unofficial eastern bypass of Zephyrhills. It runs from SR 39 south of Zephyrhills to CR 35 Alt. in Vitis.

== County Road 575 ==
Blanton-Trilby Road
- Location: Blanton-Trilby

County Road 575 is Blanton-Trilby Road, which runs south and north from CR 41 & CR 41 Alternate in Blanton to US 301 / SR 575 in Lacoochee. The route was a former segment of SR 575.

== County Road 577 ==
Curley Road St. Joe Road Lake Iola Road
- Location: Wesley Chapel-South of Dixie

County Road 577 runs from Wesley Chapel to south of the former community of Dixie. The route was formerly SR 577

=== Route description ===
The route begins at Florida State Road 54 and runs northeast along Curley Road. The route runs along some remaining ranch land on the east side, but passes by the entrance to the Chapel Pines neighborhood across from there, and later between the Bridge Water Subdivision and Watergrass neighborhoods, the latter of which contains a roundabout with Infinite Drive, then an intersection with Overpass Road (future CR 530 extension). A second roundabout exists with Elam Road, and a third roundabout with Keifer Road, and Ibis Grove Boulevard within Robin's Cove Estates.

North of the roundabout with Keifer Road, the east side contains sparse residential development called "Knollwood Acres." The route makes a sharp turn to the east just before the intersection with CR 579 ALT (Prospect Road), then turns left to continue its northbound journey, only this time it is straight north. Beyond the intersection of Florida State Road 52 (McCabe Road) sparse development can be found on the west side, beginning with a local Knights of Columbus Hall. Just as the road enters San Antonio, Florida, it intersects Pasco County Road 52 (Schrader Memorial Highway).

North of CR 52, the route climbs a hill and passes through a residential area before it enters "downtown" San Antonio, though it mostly runs along the western edge. Leaving downtown, the road crosses the former right of way of the Orange Belt Railway just south of Railroad Avenue. This line is slated for conversion into a rail-trail. The route leaves the city limits just before the intersection of Pasco Road, though some intersections still serve the city north of the border. The closest representation to a major intersection beyond the city is Darby Road (CR 578 ALT) and Darby Trail, the former of which is the location for the San Antonio Elementary School.

Entering St. Joseph makes a sharp left turn along the trajectory with Old St. Joe Road then curves north again briefly passing by the St Joseph Cemetery. Curley Road ends at Eastern County Road 578 (St. Joe Road), and though it is replaced by unmarked Jessamine Road, CR 577 makes a left turn onto westbound CR 578. At the shared intersection of Scharber Road and Lake Iola Road CR 577 leaves the overlap with CR 578 and resumes going north onto Lake Iola Road.

Less than a mile north, the route makes another sharp left turn and runs south of the road's namesake, then curves back to the north at Lazy D Ranch Road. Continuing north, CR 577 crosses a bridge over Interstate 75 with no access, and then intersects Johnston Road, which leads to an RV park 1.5 miles to the west. A second RV park has been proposed for the opposite side of the intersection with Johnston Road just north of the bridge over I-75. County Road 577 ends at a wye intersection with Pasco County Road 41. Lake Iola Road continues along CR 41 until the intersection with Dan Brown Hill Road at the Pasco-Hernando County Line where the road becomes Spring Lake Highway (Hernando CR 541).

== County Road 578 ==
County Line Road St. Joe Road 21st Street Lock Street
- Location: Spring Hill-Masaryktown; Darby-Dade City

County Road 578 exists as two separate routes on two sides of Pasco County. The western segment is a west to east route that runs along the Hernando-Pasco County Line from US 19 to US 41, and it is aptly named "County Line Road." The eastern segment runs along St. Joe Road, 21st Street (Pasco CR 41), and Lock Street from Pasco County Road 581 in Darby to US 98-301 in Dade City. The road was at one time signed as SR 578.

=== County Road 578 Alternate ===
County Road 578 Alternate
- Location: Darby-San Antonio

County Road 578 Alternate exists as an alternate route of the eastern segment of CR 578, but has no direct connection to that route. It runs west to east along Darby Road from Pasco County Road 581 in Darby to CR 577 north of San Antonio, Florida. The road was at one time signed as SR 578A.

== County Road 579 ==
Morris Bridge Road Handcart Road Prospect Road Happy Hill Road.
- Location: Hillsborough River State Park-West of Dade City

County Road 579 exists as a route in southern central Pasco County. It runs south-to-north along Morris Bridge Road from the Hillsborough-Pasco County Line and ends at CR 578 west of Dade City. The route was formerly SR 579

=== Route description ===
County Road 579 enters Pasco County from Hillsborough County as a continuation of Morris Bridge Road (Hillsborough CR 579), crossing the border at a utility pole right-of-way. The first major intersection in Pasco County since July 2019 has been Florida State Road 56. North of that route, the road runs between two plots of farmland then passes by two mobile home parks, Timber Lake Estates on the west side, then Tippecanoe Village on the east side, which is on the southeast corner of the intersection with Chancey Road, a local street that leads to County Road 535 (Pasco County, Florida) eastbound. Running straight north since the south end Tippecanoe Village, the road passes mostly urban-residential properties, with the exceptions of one church and one school. An even important intersection is with Florida State Road 54 as well as the beginning of the overlap of Eastern Pasco County Road 54. Morris Bridge Road ends there, but CR 579 continues along this overlap with CR 54.

CR 54 curves to the right and turns east towards US 98 in Branchborough, while CR 579 breaks away at the intersection of Handcart Road, and resumes the former trajectory of Eiland Boulevard. As with CR 577 to the west, much of the landscape consists of recently abandoned farmland being replaced by residential areas including Watergrass development at Old Bridge Road.

Handcart Road ends at Pasco County Road 579 Alternate (Prospect Road), but CR 579 makes a right turn along Prospect Road then curves to the north where it eventually encounters the intersection of Florida State Road 52. The next intersection is with Pasco County Road 52, which until mid-February 2023 was part of SR 52. North of that, the name of the street is changed to Happy Hill Road, and from there it passes two ends of a street named Lakeview Road before the intersection with Roth Road, a former segment of SR 52.

Shortly after passing a development named Summit View (formerly Happy Hill Estates), the road enters a wooded area as it makes a reverse curve to the right and left. North of this reverse curve, the woods are entirely on the west side of the road, which runs over a culvert for a canal leading from Drew Lake to Suwannee Lake. Happy Hill Road and Pasco County Road 579 come to an end at Pasco County Road 578 (St. Joe Road).

=== County Road 579 Alternate ===
Prospect Road
- Location: South of San Antonio-South of St. Leo

County Road 579 Alternate is an alternate of CR 579 that runs west to east from CR 577 south of San Antonio to CR 579 south of St. Leo. The road was at one time signed as SR 579A.

=== Route description ===
CR 579 Alt begins at the intersection with CR 577 running south. After the intersection with a small dirt road named Leonard Road, it immediately makes a sharp turn to the east, encountering another minor road named Wirt Road. The rest of the route's short journey is surrounded by farmland. CR 579 Alternate terminates at its parent route, but CR 579 takes over Prospect Road along the same trajectory, before turning north.

== County Road 581 ==
Bruce B. Downs Boulevard Bellamy Brothers Boulevard
- Location: New Tampa-Wesley Chapel; Darby-Brooksville

County Road 581 exists as two separate routes on two sides of Pasco County. The southern segment is a continuation of Hillsborough CR 581 along Bruce B. Downs Boulevard. The northern segment is a continuation of northern County Road 581 from Pasco County named Bellamy Brothers Boulevard, that runs as far north as Brooksville. It was formerly designated as SR 581 along Culbreath Road and Mitchell Road, and as SR 571 along Emerson Road. It also once included the current CR 481.

== County Road 583 ==
Ehren Cutoff
- Location: Ehren-West of Pasco

County Road 583 is marked as a south and north route named "Ehren Cutoff." It runs from southwest to northeast, with the southwestern end at US 41 in Ehern, a former community north of Land O' Lakes to SR 52 within the farm and marshland east of Gower's Corner and west of Pasco. The road was formerly signed as SR 583

== County Road 587 ==
Gunn Highway Massachusetts Avenue DeCubellis Road Moon Lake Road
- Location: Lutz-Odessa; New Port Richey-Moon Lake

County Road 587 exists as two separate routes on two sections of western Pasco County. The southern segment is entirely a bi-county south to north route that runs from the Pasco-Hillsborough County Line to SR 54 in Odessa. This segment is historically part of Gunn Highway, which turns west along SR 54 to southern New Port Richey.

=== Route description ===
The northern segment runs west to east along Massachusetts Avenue beginning at Congress Avenue in New Port Richey, then becomes DeCubellis Road after the intersection with Little Road (CR 1), and curves north after the intersection with Starkey Blvd., thereby becoming a south to north route. At the intersection with Ridge Road (CR 524), the name changes to Moon Lake Road as it winds through Moon Lake Estates, and finally terminates at SR 52. Both segments of the road were formerly signed as SR 587.

=== County Road 587 Truck ===
Little Road Ridge Road
- Location: New Port Richey-Moon Lake Estates

County Road 587 Truck is a truck detour of northern County Road 587 which overlaps two other routes in the vicinity of New Port Richey, Florida, specifically overlaps CR 1 and CR 524. Both roads were originally segments of SR 587.

== County Road 595 ==
Mile Stretch Road Grand Boulevard Aripeka Road
- Location: Holiday-New Port Richey; South of Aripeka-Aripeka

County Road 595 is a county extension of Florida State Road 595, a mostly hidden route for US Alternate 19 from downtown St. Petersburg to Holiday.

=== Route description ===
The first segment begins a block north of the northern terminus of Alternate US 19 in Holiday at Mile Stretch Road. County Road 595 consists of Mile Stretch Road, then takes a sharp left onto Grand Boulevard. Within Holiday and Elfers, the road runs along the right-of-way of a former Seaboard Air Line Railroad line before crossing Main Street in New Port Richey, from where it continues north along Grand Boulevard along the east bank of the Pithlachascotee River until reaching US 19 in Port Richey.

The second segment runs along Aripeka Road, north of Hudson. It runs west from US 19, then intersects the historic Dixie Highway as it curves north towards "downtown" Aripeka. Pasco County Road 595 ends at the South Palm Island Bridge in Aripeka along the Gulf of Mexico, where the street name changes from Aripeka Road to Osowaw Boulevard, and the route becomes Hernando County Road 595.

=== County Road 595 Alternate ===
County Road 595 Alternate
- Location: Western Pasco County

County Road 595 Alternate (marked on FDOT maps as County Road 595A) runs between the Pinellas-Pasco County Line and southwestern New Port Richey, the roads consist of Baillies Bluff Road, Strauber Memorial Highway, and Trouble Creek Road.
