= Seven Springs, Florida =

Unincorporated community in Pasco County, US

Seven Springs
- unincorporated area
- Interactive map of Seven Springs
- Country: United States
- State: Florida
- County: Pasco
- GNIS feature ID: 295613

Seven Springs is an unincorporated community on the Gulf Coast in Pasco County, Florida. It is located in the census-designated place of New Port Richey, in the south-west region of Pasco County.

== Geography ==
Seven Springs is bordered to the north by New Port Richey, to the west by Elfers, to the south by Trinity, and to the east by Starkey Ranch.

== History ==
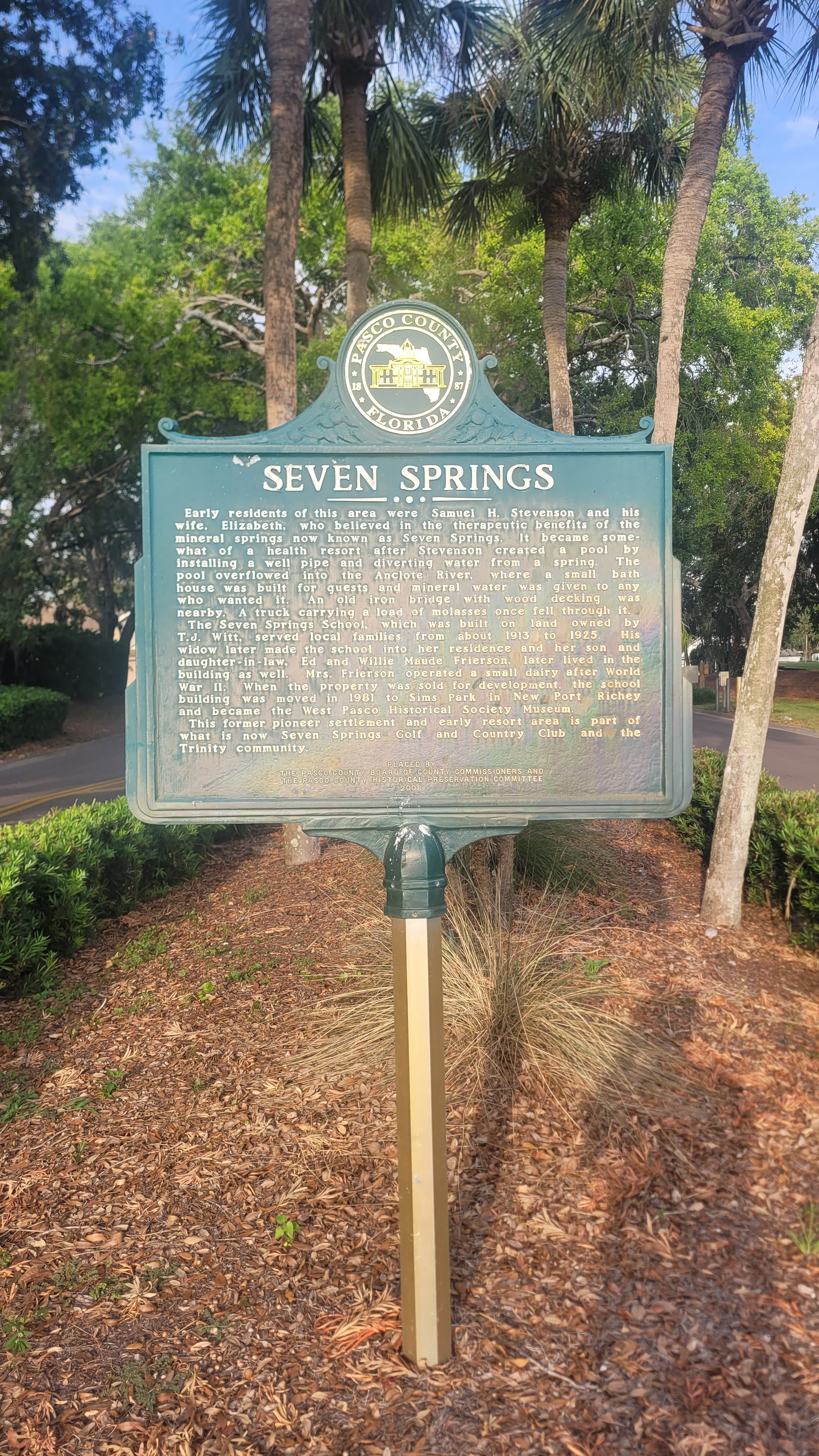
Historic marker outside of Seven Springs Golf & Country Club

Early residents to Seven Springs were Samuel H. Stevenson and Elizabeth Stevenson. At first, Seven Springs was a health resort because Elizabeth Stevenson believed the water in the Anclote River had therapeutic benefits. Seven Springs was home to one of the first tourist homes in West Pasco. The area constructed several hotels and brought many people.

The first school was Seven Springs school, which existed from 1913 to 1925. for 1913-1914, the school was located in a different building while the school building was under construction. The location of the school was east of Little Road and 400 to 500 yards south of the Anclote River. In 1981, the school building was donated to the West Pasco Historical Society, before being moved to Sims Park, where it currently sits as a museum and library.

Seven Springs has a historic marker outside of the Seven Springs Golf & Country club, which explains the history of the area and former residents.

== Education ==
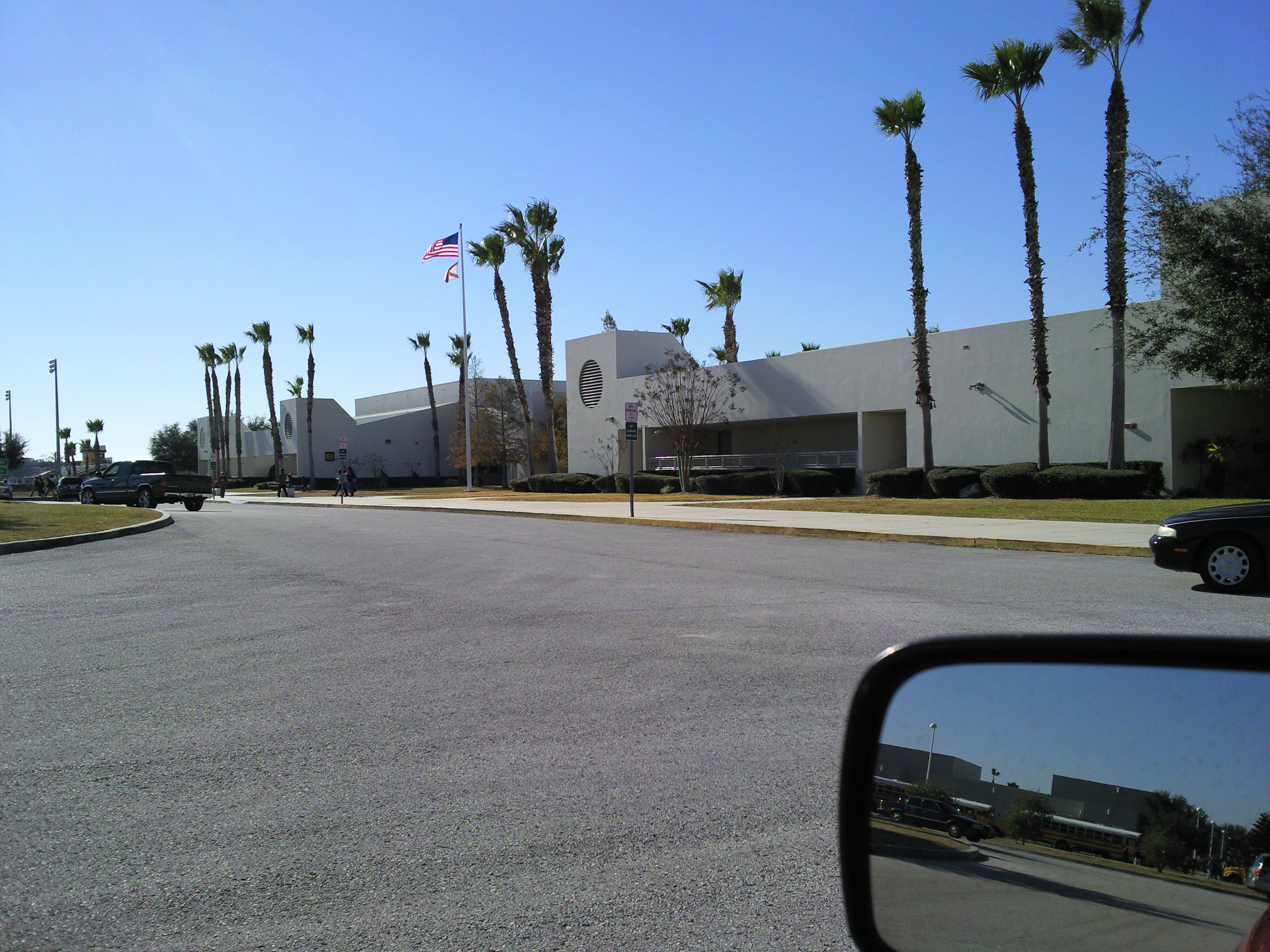
Front of Seven Springs Middle School

Seven Springs is served by Pasco County Schools, specifically Seven Springs Elementary, Seven Springs Middle School, and J. W. Mitchell High School.

== Major roads ==
Major roads near Seven Springs includes:

- Florida State Road 54
- U.S. Route 19
- Little Road (CR 1)
