= Florida State Road 54 =

Highway in Florida

State Road 54
- SR 54 highlighted in red

Route information
- Maintained by FDOT
- Length: 38.378 mi (61.763 km) including connecting segment of CR 54
- Existed: 1945 renumbering (definition)–present

Major junctions
- West end: US 19 near Tarpon Springs
- US 41 in Land o' Lakes; I-75 in Wesley Chapel
- East end: US 301 in Zephyrhills

Location
- Country: United States
- State: Florida
- Counties: Pasco

Highway system
- Florida State Highway System; Interstate; US; State; Former; Pre‑1945; Toll; Scenic
← SR 53	→ SR 55

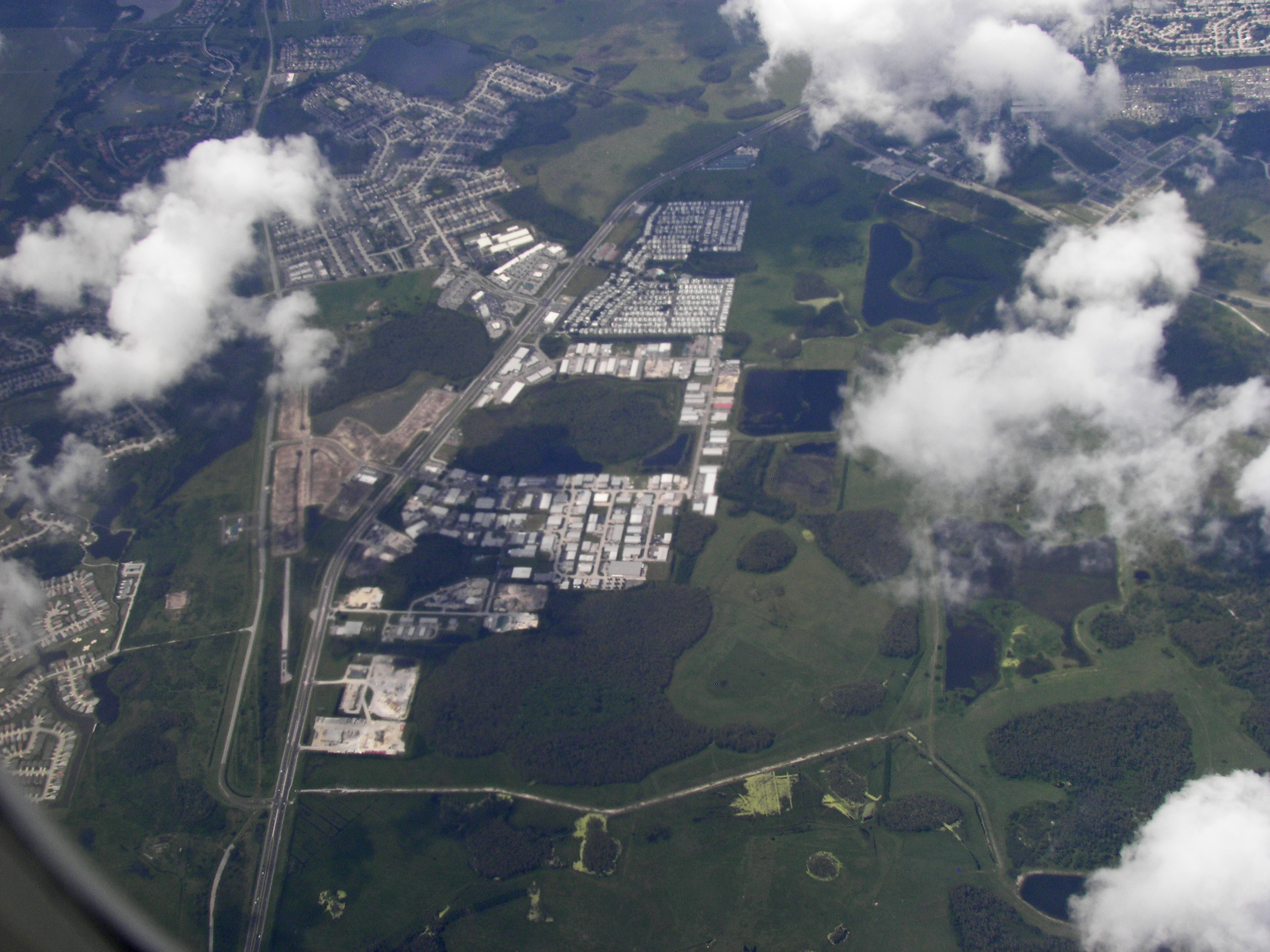
S.R. 54 with the former Tampa Bay Executive Airport in Odessa.

State Road 54 (SR 54) is located in the Tampa Bay Area, north of Tampa itself, and runs from US 19 in Elfers in the west to US 301 in Zephyrhills, in the east. In between it passes through Wesley Chapel, Land o' Lakes, and Elfers.

== Route description ==
SR 54 is a six-lane divided highway from its western terminus at US 19. In between County Roads 77 and 1 in Seven Springs, the road moves southeast along the Mitchell Bypass, which crosses over the Anclote River the moment it moves away from Old CR 54. The segment between Trinity Boulevard and Gunn Highway in Odessa was rebuilt and relocated along a former Atlantic Coast Line Railroad right-of-way that ran from Pinellas County where much of the Pinellas Trail exists today into Trilby. Pasco County created a gap in this route between the western terminus of State Road 56 and the northern terminus of State Road 581 by exchanging maintenance responsibilities with FDOT for those caused by the newly created SR 56. This western segment of SR 54 became CR 54. This western CR 54 segment has been widened to six lanes from just west of Interstate 75 to the resumption of State Road 54 at State Road 581, and the six lane highway continues eastward as State Road 54 from that point to a point east of Curley Road, where the highway currently (as of 2012) ends. A West Zephyrhills Bypass has been proposed between a location east of the intersection with CR 577 (Curley Road) and the north end of the merger of CR 579 and the eastern segment of CR 54, also known as Eiland Boulevard, near Zephyrhills. In the meantime, State Road 54 remains a two-lane undivided highway from the end of the newer highway to SR 54's eastern terminus at US 301 in downtown Zephyrhills.

== History ==
The current Florida State Road 54 was established during the great renumbering of 1945, after the original SR 54 was replaced by Florida State Road 85 between Crestview in Okaloosa County and the Alabama State Line north of Walton County. It was previously called Florida State Road 209.

=== Former segments ===
Seven Springs:

- Old County Road 54(Fifth Avenue), Little Road(CR 1), Gunn Highway

Odessa:

- Abandoned State Road 54 R.O.W.: Gunn Highway from CR 996 to Old Gunn Highway.
- Black Lake Road

Land o' Lakes:

- Catfish Lake Lane

Cypress Creek:

- Cabbage Swamp Road
- Memorial Drive

Wesley Chapel:

- County Road 54 (Western segment), left as a gap in the state road when State Road 56 was constructed.

Zephyrhills:

- State Road 54 continued from its present terminus at US 301 along a concurrency with 301 to the present-day eastern segment of County Road 54, where it followed present CR 54 eastward to US 98 and the Pasco-Polk County line(see below).

== Major intersections ==
The entire route is in Pasco County.

Location	mi	km	Destinations	Notes
Elfers	0.000	0.000	US 19 (SR 55) – Tarpon Springs, St. Petersburg, New Port Richey	Western terminus
Elfers	0.875	1.408	CR 595 (Grand Boulevard) – New Port Richey	
Seven Springs	2.720	4.377	CR 77 (Seven Springs Boulevard)	
Seven Springs	4.769	7.675	CR 1 (Little Road) – Tarpon Springs, Safety Harbor	
Odessa	9.658	15.543	CR 587 south (Gunn Highway) – Citrus Park, Tampa	
Odessa	10.116	16.280	Black Lake Road (SR 54A east)	Former SR 54 east
Odessa	10.982	17.674	Black Lake Road (SR 54A west)	
Odessa	12.87	20.71	SR 589 (Suncoast Parkway) – Brooksville, Tampa	SR 589 exit 19
Land o' Lakes	17.947	28.883	US 41 (Land o' Lakes Boulevard / SR 45) to SR 589 – Land o' Lakes	
Wesley Chapel	22.339	35.951	SR 56 east to I-75 – Zephyrhills	East end of state maintenance
Wesley Chapel	27.1	43.6	I-75 (SR 93) – Ocala, Tampa, St. Petersburg	I-75; exit 279
Wesley Chapel	27.404	44.102	SR 581 south	West end of state maintenance
Wesley Chapel	29.727	47.841	CR 577 north (Curley Road) – San Antonio	
	34.167	54.986	CR 54 east / CR 579 (Morris Bridge Road / Eiland Boulevard) – Dade City, Tampa	
Zephyrhills	38.378	61.763	US 301 (Gall Boulevard / SR 39) to SR 39 south / CR 54 – Dade City, Tampa, Hillsborough River State Park	Eastern terminus
1.000 mi = 1.609 km; 1.000 km = 0.621 mi: Route transition

== Related routes ==
=== County Road 54 (Zephyrhills-Branchborough) ===
County Road 54
- Location: Zephyrhills-Branchborough

Besides the gap between SR 56 and SR 581 in Wesley Chapel, County Road 54 is a county extension of SR 54 south of Dade City. It begins at County Road 579 (Morris Bridge Road) west of downtown Zephyrhills and runs north in a short overlap with that road until it curves east, and runs east along Eiland Boulevard, while CR 579 continues north along Handcart Road. This intersection is also the site of the eastern terminus of the proposed West Zephyrhills Bypass. Turning briefly to the southeast it then moves straight east and west along a former segment of North Avenue, only to turn northeast again at the intersection with the existing North Avenue, then turns straight before encountering County Road 41, and then an intersection with U.S. Route 301, where it catches hidden SR 54.

East of US 301 the road runs towards the northeastern outskirts of Zephyrhills. Before this it encounters an intersection with 12th Street and Wire Road, which is where a former segment of SR 54 used to turn north from 12th Street then east to the present CR 54 until that route was relocated to the hidden route along US 301. Once CR 54 leaves the city north of Zephyrhills Municipal Airport it has an intersection with the western terminus of County Road 54 Alternate (see below) on the northwest corner of an at-grade crossing with the CSX Yeoman Subdivision, and east of that crossing encounters a major county road known as CR 535 (Zephyrhills Bypass). From there, the road takes a slight turn to the northeast as it crosses another CSX railroad line known as the Vitis Subdivision, and then runs along the northern border of the Upper Hillsborough Wildlife Management Area. Shifting back straight east and west again, it approaches the southern terminus of Alternate CR 35 in Lumberton, although ALT CR 35 may have overlapped CR 54 east of here at one time. Beyond this point it passes through the aforementioned wildlife management area where it approaches a narrow bridge over the Hillsborough River, thus running along the Pasco-Polk County line, both side of which consist of private property once again until it finally reaches US 98 in Branchborough.

=== State Road 54A ===
State Road 54A
- Location: Odessa

State Road 54A, known locally as Black Lake Road, is a road located in Odessa, Florida totaling 1.097 miles (1.765 km). Portions of the road were once part of State Road 54 until it was realigned to bypass the suburbs it runs along. Despite the realignment, Black Lake Road is still maintained by FDOT. It consists of two separate roads, both named Black Lake Road, as well as a cul de sac, originally connecting to the current SR 54.

=== County Road 54 Alternate ===
County Road 54 Alternate
- Location: Zephyrhills North-Lumberton

County Road 54 Alternate is a bannered alternate of CR 54 east of the Zephyrhills City Limits. It begins on the west side of the CR 54 at-grade crossing of the CSX Yeoman Subdivision, as Forbes Road and almost immediately turns straight north From there it curves east onto Lynbrook Drive and crosses the very same railroad line with an at-grade crossing of its own. The only other road that passes for a major intersection at this point is CR 535 (Zephyrhills Bypass).

Before Lynbrook Road becomes a dead end street in Lumberton, ALT CR 54 makes another north turn onto Elwood Road. It briefly turns northeast onto Merrick Road where it crosses another CSX railroad line known as the Vitis Subdivision, and after passing two dirt roads such as Lena Circle and Bayleaf Street finally turns straight east and west once again. ALT CR 54 remains at this trajectory until it officially ends at Alternate County Road 35, although as with its parent route, ALT CR 54 may have overlapped ALT CR 35 going south back to CR 54 at one time.
