= Anclote River =

River in Florida, United States

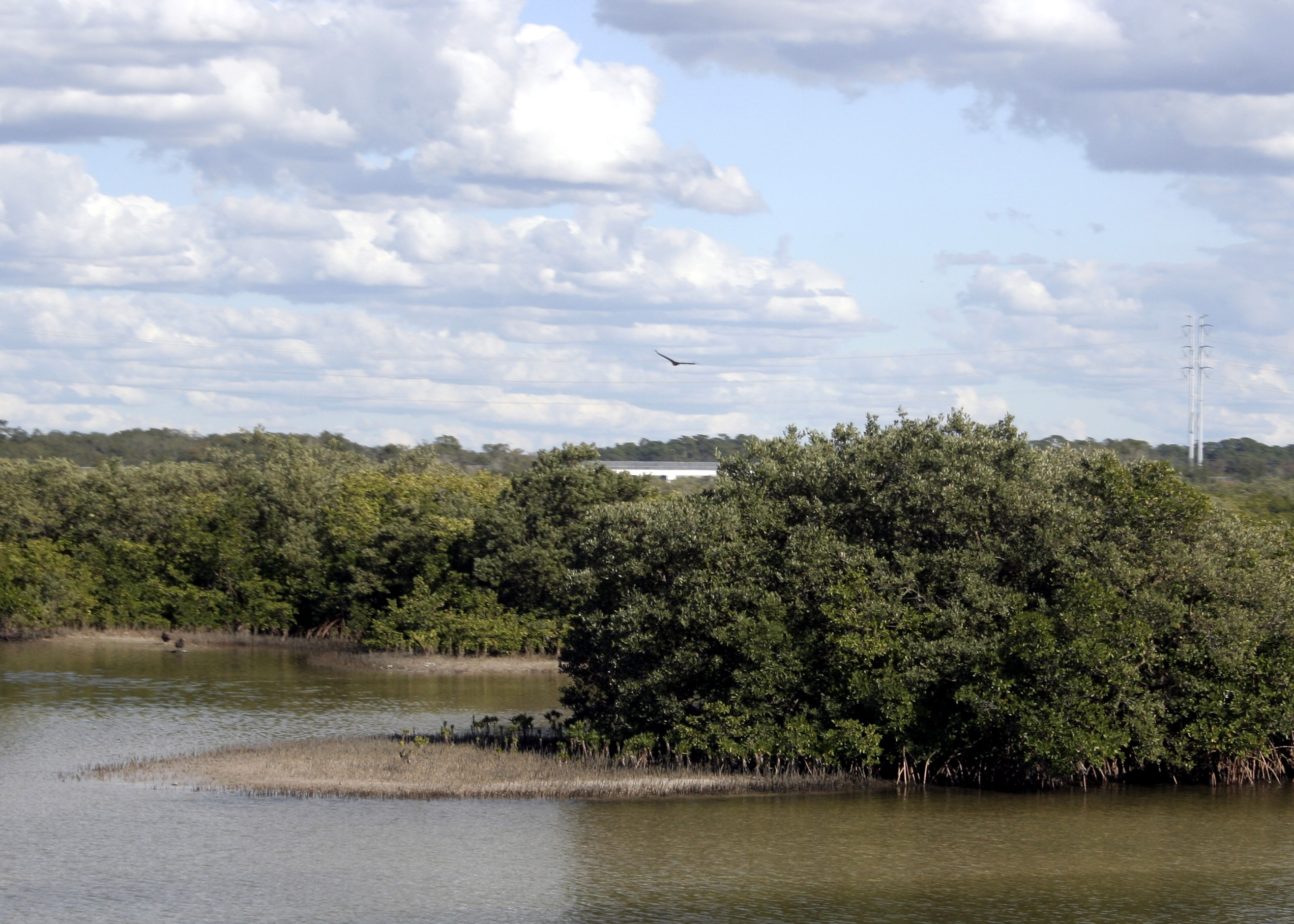
- Anclote River looking east from the Pinellas Avenue bridge.

Location
- Country: United States
- State: Florida
- Counties: Pasco, Pinellas
- District: SWFWMD

Physical characteristics
- Source: Starkey Wilderness Park
  - location: Land o' Lakes, Florida
  - coordinates: 28°16′44″N 82°30′48″W
- Mouth: St. Joseph Sound
  - location: Tarpon Springs, Florida
  - coordinates: 28°10′38″N 82°47′45″W
- Length: 29 mi (47 km)
- Basin size: 98 mi^{2} (250 km^{2})

Basin features
- Tributaries
  - left: Tarpon Bayous

The Anclote River, running for 29 miles (47 km) near Tarpon Springs, Florida flows westward towards the Gulf of Mexico from its source of creeks and springs inland. The river is home to a variety of fish and wildlife. Anclote River is home to the sponging and fishing industries of Tarpon Springs (including a large shrimp industry). It is a major site for tourists of the area as it flows through the spongedocks of Tarpon Springs.

An extension of the Pinellas Trail which crosses the Anclote River was dedicated on June 15, 2004. The new extension is built along abandoned Atlantic Coast Line railroad grade, which once serviced industry on the north side of the river.

== List of crossings ==
Crossing	Carries	Image	Location	Coordinates
Headwaters				28°16′44″N 82°30′48″W
140076; 140077	SR 589; Suncoast Parkway			28°14′14″N 82°33′02″W
Confluence with South Branch Anclote River			Starkey Wilderness Park	28°13′20″N 82°36′34″W
144059	Starkey Boulevard		New Port Richey	28°13′29″N 82°38′33″W
144051	CR 1 Little Road		Trinity	28°12′52″N 82°39′58″W
Father Felix Ullrich Bridge; 140067	SR 54		Seven Springs	28°12′53″N 82°40′56″W
144024	CR 77; Seven Springs Boulevard		Elfers	28°12′56″N 82°41′32″W
144017	Celtic Drive		Elfers	28°12′57″N 82°41′56″W
140034	Perrine Ranch Road		Holiday	28°11′39″N 82°43′07″W
Outflow of Salt Lake				28°10′08″N 82°43′52″W
150235	US 19		Tarpon Springs	28°09′49″N 82°44′26″W
Old ACL Bridge	Pinellas Trail Elfers Spur		Tarpon Springs	28°09′34″N 82°44′51″W
150006	US 19 Alt. Pinellas Avenue		Tarpon Springs	28°09′27″N 82°45′25″W
Confluence with Tarpon Bayous			Tarpon Springs	28°09′36″N 82°46′09″W
Anclote Power Plant Inflow Canal			Tarpon Springs	28°10′33″N 82°47′25″W
Mouth				28°10′38″N 82°47′45″W

== Anclote River Park ==
The Anclote River Park has of a 300-foot sandy beach (91 m) facing the sandbars of the Anclote River. The back of the beach zone is dotted with big oak trees. The park includes an Indian Burial Mound with structures built over other burial grounds in the park. The park has designated areas for swimming, boating and fishing. It is operational dawn to dusk 7 days a week. There are also changing rooms, bathrooms and outdoor showers nearby. Alcohol is not allowed and parking charges apply.
