= Florida State Road 822 =

State highway in Florida, United States

State Road 822 and County Road 822
- Sheridan Street
- SR 822 in red, CR 822 in blue, municipal portion in grey

Route information
- Maintained by FDOT and Broward Public Works
- Length: 19.792 mi (31.852 km) 5.792 mi (9.321 km) as SR 822

Major junctions
- West end: US 27 in Pembroke Pines
- I-75 in Pembroke Pines; US 441 / SR 7 in Hollywood; I-95 in Hollywood; US 1 in Hollywood
- East end: SR A1A in Hollywood

Location
- Country: United States
- State: Florida
- County: Broward

Highway system
- Florida State Highway System; Interstate; US; State; Former; Pre‑1945; Toll; Scenic
← SR 821	→ SR 823

Sheridan Street is a 19.8-mile-long (31.9 km) east–west commuter highway in Broward County, signed as State Road 822 (SR 822) and County Road 822 (CR 822).

Its western terminus is an intersection with U.S. Route 27 (US 27) in Pembroke Pines. At Southwest 185th Way, the CR 822 designation begins. The road continues east to US 441/State Road 7 in Hollywood, where it becomes SR 822, continuing east to terminate at Ocean Drive (SR A1A) next to Hollywood Beach Park.

== Route description ==
Sheridan Street begins at US 27 (SR 25). It serves as the southern boundaries of Cooper City and Davie and the northern boundary of Pembroke Pines along the way. This carries the designation of CR 822, though it is also signed as "TO SR 822" (although it is signed at its intersections with State Road 7 and University Drive.

In Hollywood, Sheridan Street intersects US 441 and SR 7 continuing eastbound as a divided road out of a commercial area to residential housing for a few blocks before becoming a mix of residential and commercial ventures. This intersection marks the transition from CR 822 to SR 822 as well. East of Park Road, it forms the southern boundary of Topeekeegee Yugnee Park, quickly headed for an interchange with Interstate 95 (I-95), with commercial areas on both sides of the street prior to the interchange. East of I-95, Sheridan Street becomes a bit more residential, although businesses line the street, as it passes by Boggs Field Park, and intersects US 1. East of US 1, the divided street ends, and the road becomes purely residential. It enters West Lake Park, providing access to Anne Kolb Nature Center, following a crossing of West Lake. Sheridan Street then crosses the Intracoastal Waterway, terminating at SR A1A near Hollywood Beach Park.

== Major intersections ==
The entire route is in Broward County.

Location	mi	km	Destinations	Notes
Pembroke Pines	0.0	0.0	US 27	
Pembroke Pines–Southwest Ranches line	2.4	3.9	Southwest 185th Way	Begin CR 822
Pembroke Pines–Southwest Ranches line	5.1	8.2	I-75 – Miami, Naples	Exit 11 on I-75
Pembroke Pines–Cooper City line	7.5	12.1	SR 823 (Flamingo Road)	
Pembroke Pines–Cooper City line	11.5	18.5	SR 817 (University Drive)	
Hollywood	14.0 0.000	22.5 0.000	US 441 / SR 7	Transition from CR 822 to SR 822
Hollywood	2.75	4.43	I-95 – West Palm Beach, Miami	Exit 21 on I-95 (unsigned SR 9)
Hollywood	3.639	5.856	Dixie Highway	
Dania Beach–Hollywood line	4.057	6.529	US 1 to I-595 / Florida's Turnpike – Airport	Unsigned SR 5
Hollywood	5.638– 5.705	9.073– 9.181	Intracoastal Waterway bridge	
Hollywood	5.792	9.321	SR A1A (Ocean Drive)	Eastern terminus
1.000 mi = 1.609 km; 1.000 km = 0.621 mi: Route transition
