= Interstate 75 in Florida =

Highway in Florida

Interstate 75
- I-75 highlighted in red

Route information
- Maintained by FDOT
- Length: 470.741 mi (757.584 km)
- Existed: 1956–present
- NHS: Entire route

Major junctions
- South end: SR 826 / SR 924 in Miami Lakes
- Florida's Turnpike Extension in Hialeah and Miramar; I-595 / SR 869 in Sunrise; I-275 near Ellenton; SR 618 near Brandon; I-4 near Tampa; I-275 near Wesley Chapel; US 98 / SR 50 near Brooksville; Florida's Turnpike near Wildwood; US 27 in Ocala; I-10 near Lake City
- North end: I-75 at the Georgia state line near Jennings

Location
- Country: United States
- State: Florida
- Counties: Miami-Dade, Broward, Collier, Lee, Charlotte, DeSoto, Sarasota, Manatee, Hillsborough, Pasco, Hernando, Sumter, Marion, Alachua, Columbia, Suwannee, Hamilton

Highway system
- Interstate Highway System; Main; Auxiliary; Suffixed; Business; Future; Florida State Highway System; Interstate; US; State; Former; Pre‑1945; Toll; Scenic
← SR 73	→ SR 75
← SR 93	SR 93A	→ US 94

Interstate 75 (I-75) is a part of the Interstate Highway System that runs from the Hialeah–Miami Lakes line to the Canada–United States border at Sault Ste. Marie. I-75 begins its national northward journey near Miami, running along the western parts of the Miami metropolitan area before traveling westward across Alligator Alley (also known as Everglades Parkway), resuming its northward direction in Naples, running along Florida's Gulf Coast, and passing the cities of Fort Myers, Punta Gorda, Venice, and Sarasota. The freeway passes through the Tampa Bay area before turning inward toward Ocala, Gainesville, and Lake City before leaving the state and entering Georgia. I-75 runs for 471 miles (758 km) in Florida, making it the longest Interstate in the state and also the longest in any state east of the Mississippi River.

The portion of I-75 from Tampa northward was a part of the original 1955 Interstate Highway plans, with I-75's southern terminus at I-4's current western terminus. Planning to extend the Interstate south to Miami began in 1968 after massive growth in Southwest Florida, which resulted in I-75 being realigned to travel on the eastern fringes of the Tampa Bay area, and the last portion of the highway was opened in 1993.

For Florida Department of Transportation (FDOT) inventory purposes, it is designated as State Road 93 (SR 93) for most of its length in Florida (with exception to the Tampa Bay area, where SR 93 follows I-275, while SR 93A travels with I-75 in the latter's bypass of the area).

== Route description ==
As of September 2025, I-75 in Florida is 470.741 miles (757.584 km) long. The speed limit is 70 mph (110 km/h) throughout the state. The Florida Legislature authorizes FDOT to establish speed limits on Interstates and state highways.

=== South Florida ===
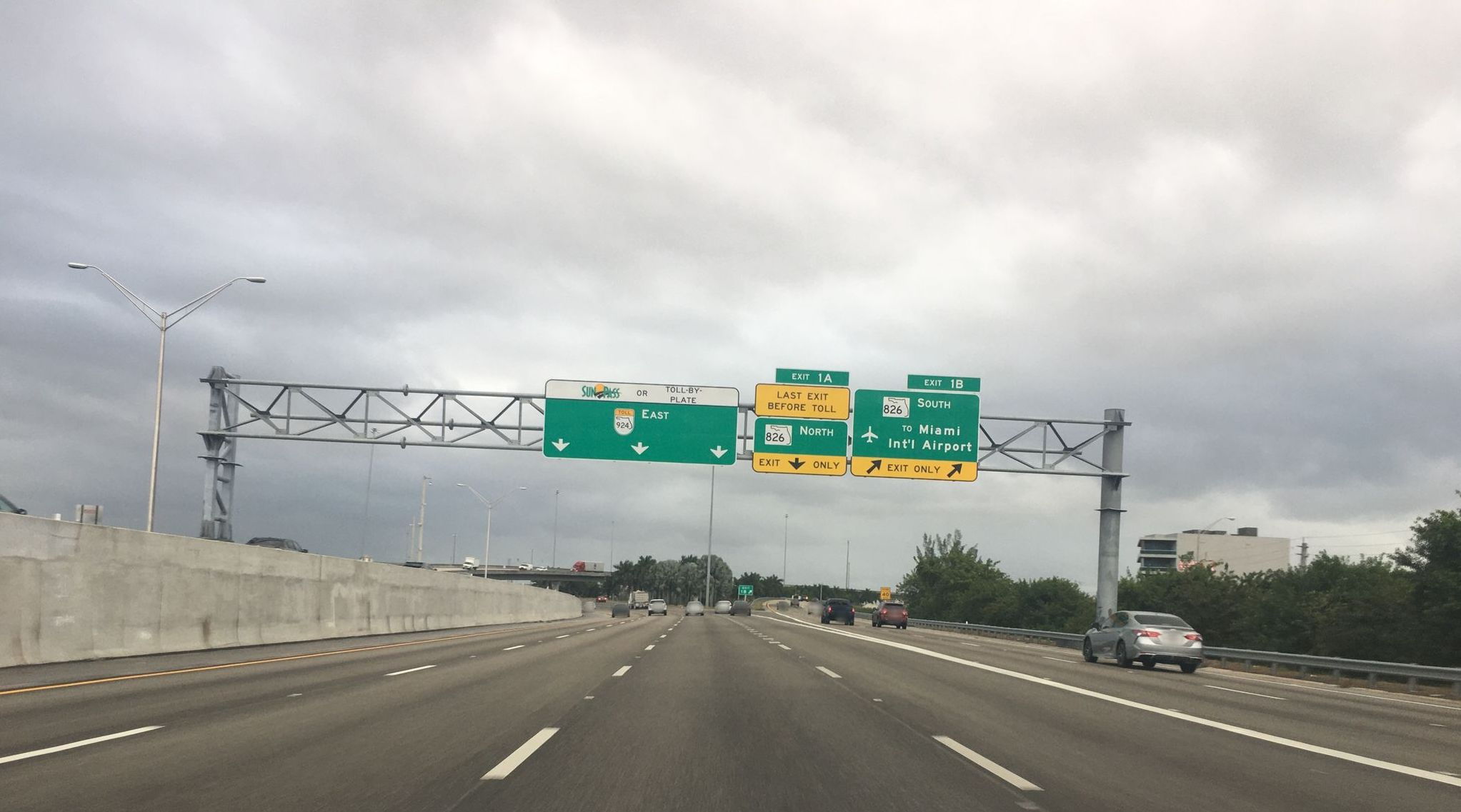
The southern end of I-75 near Miami

I-75 begins its northward journey at an interchange with SR 826 (Palmetto Expressway) and SR 924 (Gratigny Parkway) on the Hialeah–Miami Lakes border, near Miami.

As it curves around the border of Miami Lakes, I-75 serves some of the western fringes of South Florida as an eight-lane highway. After an exit with SR 860, I-75 has an interchange with the Homestead Extension of Florida's Turnpike before crossing into Broward County. There, it continues through the western suburbs of Pembroke Pines, Weston, Miramar, Davie, and Southwest Ranches.

At the junction of SR 869 (Sawgrass Expressway) and I-595, I-75 (while maintaining its south–north status) enters a west–east trajectory as it crosses the Everglades by way of Alligator Alley, a toll road that runs from the Collier Boulevard (exit 101) toll plaza to the U.S. Highway 27 (US 27) toll plaza (exit 23). It was originally constructed as a two-lane highway before it was converted to a four-lane highway meeting Interstate Highway standards. At this point, I-75 loses a lane in each direction, heading west, losing another lane west of the US 27 interchange.

=== The Everglades and Southwest Florida ===
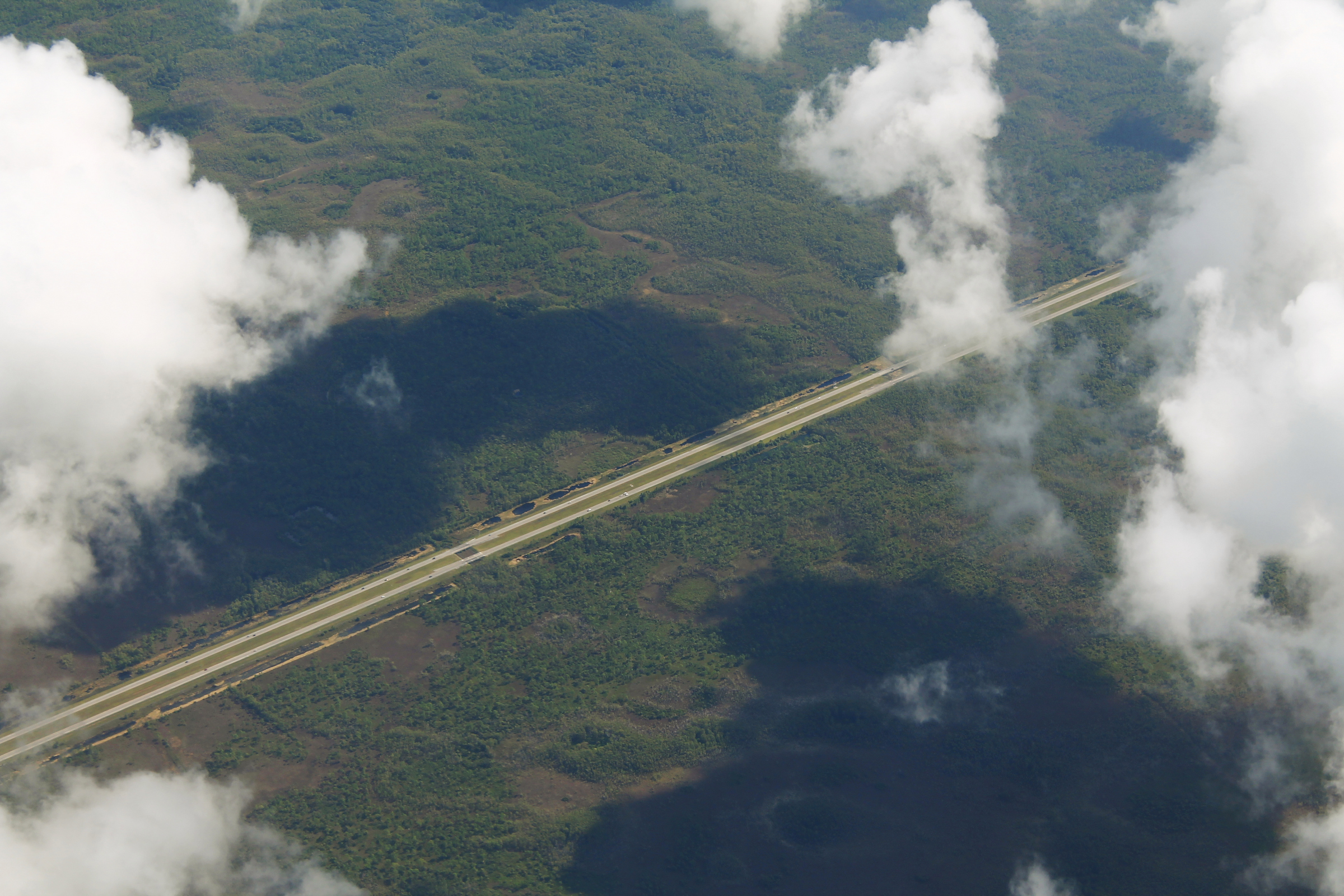
Aerial view of I-75 through Alligator Alley

The Alligator Alley section of I-75 runs due east–west between exit 19 in Sunrise and exit 101 just east of Naples and is one of only two sections along the Interstate's entirety that is tolled (the other is the Mackinac Bridge in northern Michigan). Tolls are $3.75 for a two-axle vehicle as of July 1, 2023, and are collected in both directions. The highway's toll plazas accept both cash and transponders in the SunPass network and are located at either entrance to Alligator Alley. The toll facilities along Alligator Alley and toll revenue collected from them are overseen by Florida's Turnpike Enterprise (FTE). There are two interchanges along the 75-mile (121 km) tolled portion of Alligator Alley in addition to three rest areas and a number of scenic outlook points as the highway crosses the Everglades. I-75 enters Collier County along Alligator Alley just west of the Snake Road exit (exit 49) and passes through the Big Cypress National Preserve between the Collier County border and SR 29 (exit 80). Several small bridges along Alligator Alley allow wildlife to pass safely under the freeway, especially along the Florida Panther National Wildlife Refuge east of SR 29. Extensive fencing also prevents wildlife from interfering with traffic.

As it approaches Naples at County Road 951 (CR 951; exit 101), Alligator Alley ends. The Interstate is toll-free for the rest of its length in Florida and makes a sharp turn north, resuming its north–south trajectory, and as it parallels Florida's west coast, it becomes six lanes. As it continues north, I-75 passes near Bonita Springs, Fort Myers, Punta Gorda, Port Charlotte, Venice, Sarasota, and Bradenton before reaching the Tampa Bay area metropolis consisting of Tampa and St. Petersburg.

=== Tampa Bay area ===
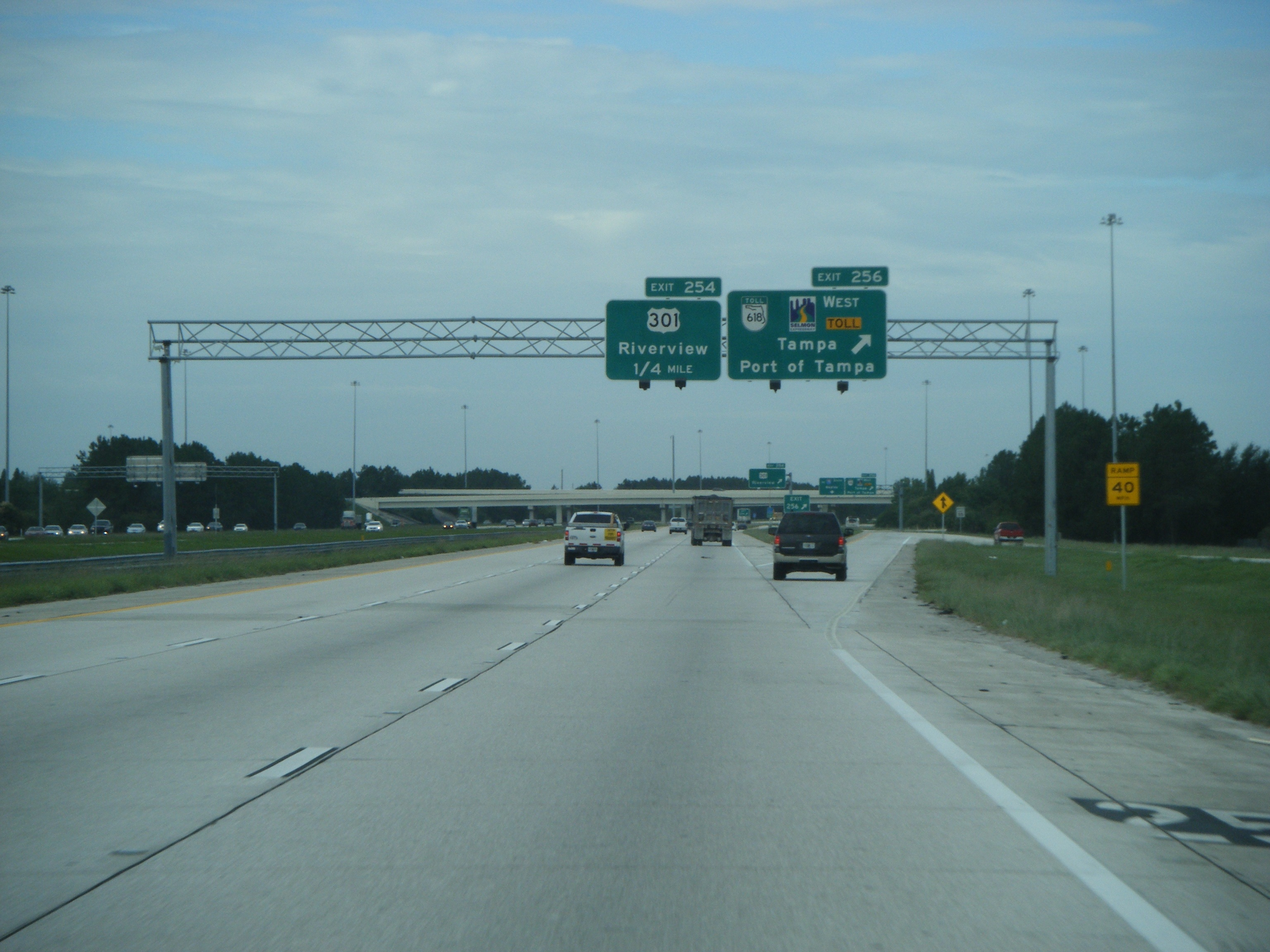
I-75 southbound at exit 256 (SR 618) in Brandon

North of Ellenton, I-275 splits from I-75 to serve St. Petersburg and Pinellas County via the Sunshine Skyway Bridge and Tampa via the Howard Frankland Bridge. I-75 parallels the eastern shore of Tampa Bay as a bypass route of the Tampa Bay area, as it passes by the communities of Brandon, Temple Terrace, and New Tampa. Two expressways access Downtown Tampa from I-75: the Lee Roy Selmon Expressway (SR 618) and I-4. Within the Tampa Bay metropolitan area, many interchanges are far more complex than mere diamond, cloverleaf, or even single-point urban interchanges. Aside from the large turbine interchange with I-4 (exit 261), there are interchanges with SR 582 (Fowler Avenue; exit 265) and SR 579 (Fletcher Avenue/Morris Bridge Road; exit 266) that contain both loops and flyovers. A flyover ramp was built from southbound SR 581 (Bruce B. Downs Boulevard; exit 270) to southbound I-75.

=== Northern Florida ===
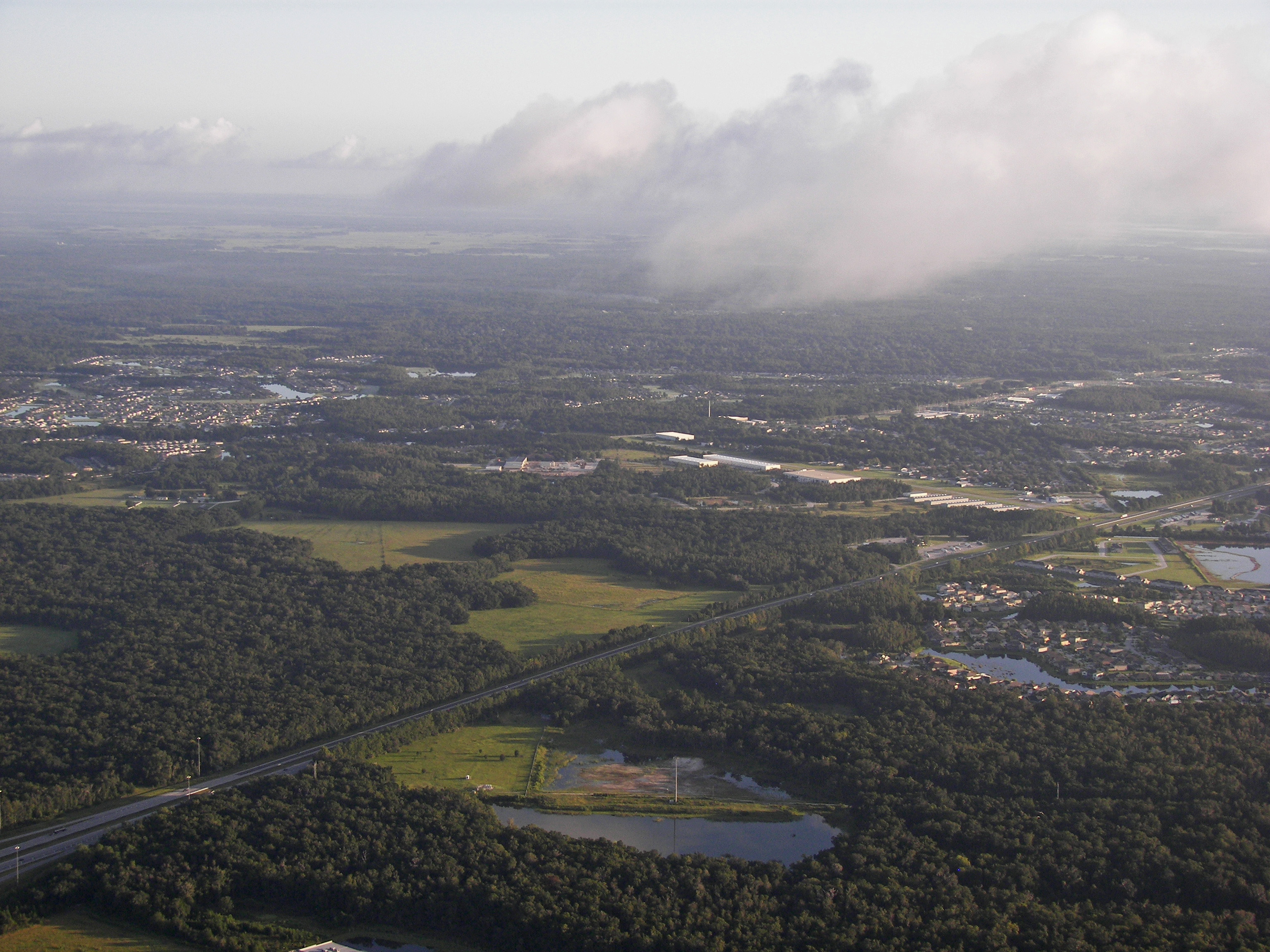
I-75 passing through south Pasco County

At the Hillsborough–Pasco county line (south of SR 56 [exit 275]), I-275 rejoins I-75 (at exit 274, southbound only) and I-75 changes into a southwest–northeast trajectory as it passes through Pasco, Hernando, and Sumter counties where it runs through parts of the Withlacoochee State Forest on its way to the junction with Florida's Turnpike (exit 328, accessible from southbound I-75 only [although northbound travelers can access the Turnpike from I-75's exit 329 and follow SR 44 to the Turnpike's exit 304]). Widened median segments exist in northern Pasco, Hernando, and Sumter counties north of CR 476B (exit 309). Some of these median segments are actually considered part of the Withlacoochee State Forest itself. The Withlacoochee State Trail runs beneath I-75 between US 98/SR 50 (exit 301) and the Hernando–Sumter county line, where it also crosses over the Withlacoochee River. All of I-75 from the Georgia border to Tampa is three lanes in each direction, unless closed for construction. This is to accommodate for the immense number of tourists and vacationers that come to Florida.

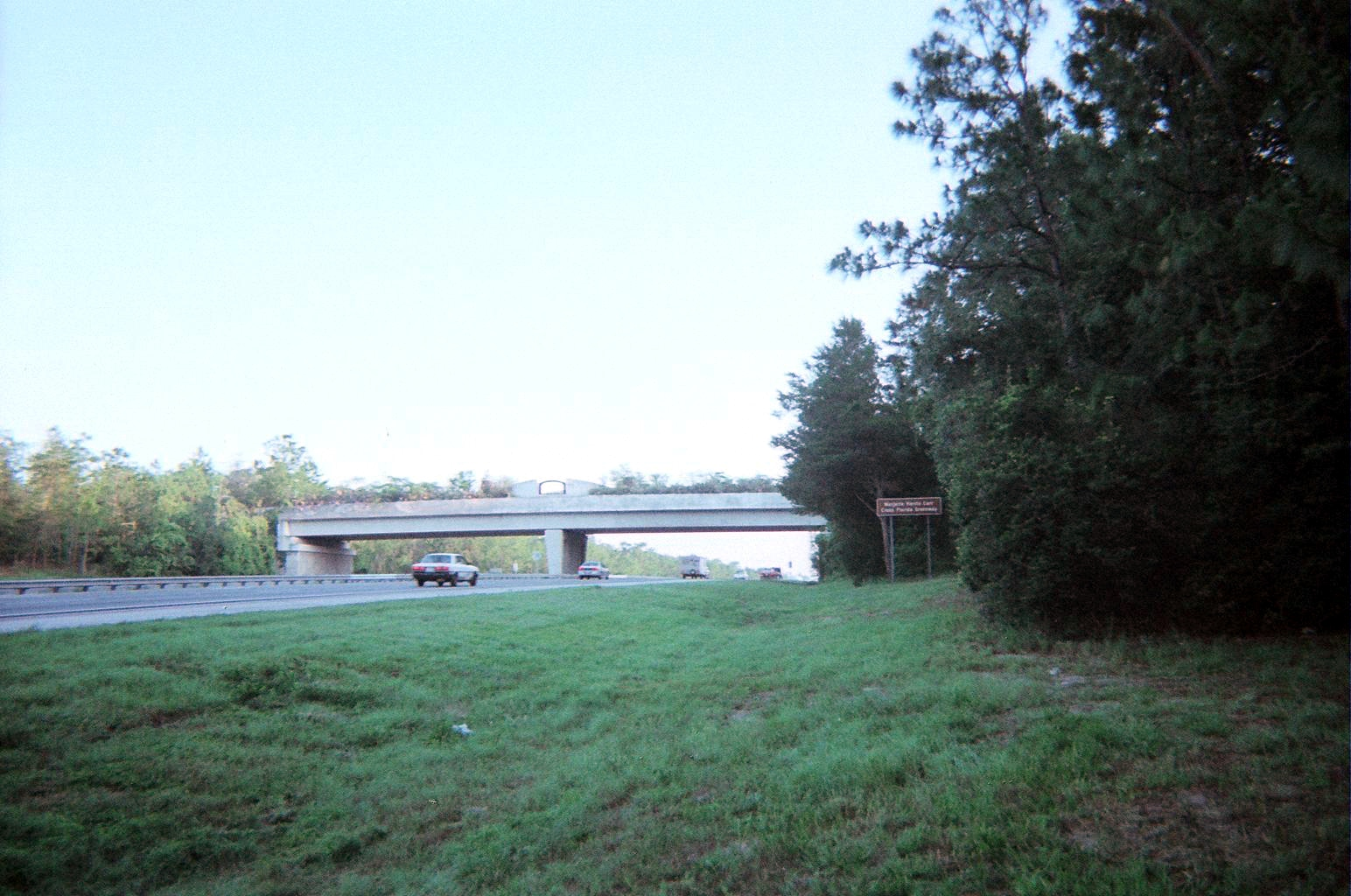
The Cross Florida Greenway bridge over I-75

After Florida's Turnpike, I-75 changes into a general southeast–northwest trajectory, which is sustained to the Georgia state line and beyond. I-75 passes beneath the Cross Florida Greenway, which contains a land bridge built across the highway in 2001 between exits 341 and 350, before entering the city of Ocala, and passing by the cities of Gainesville and Lake City and crosses I-10 at an interchange before entering the state of Georgia, near Valdosta.

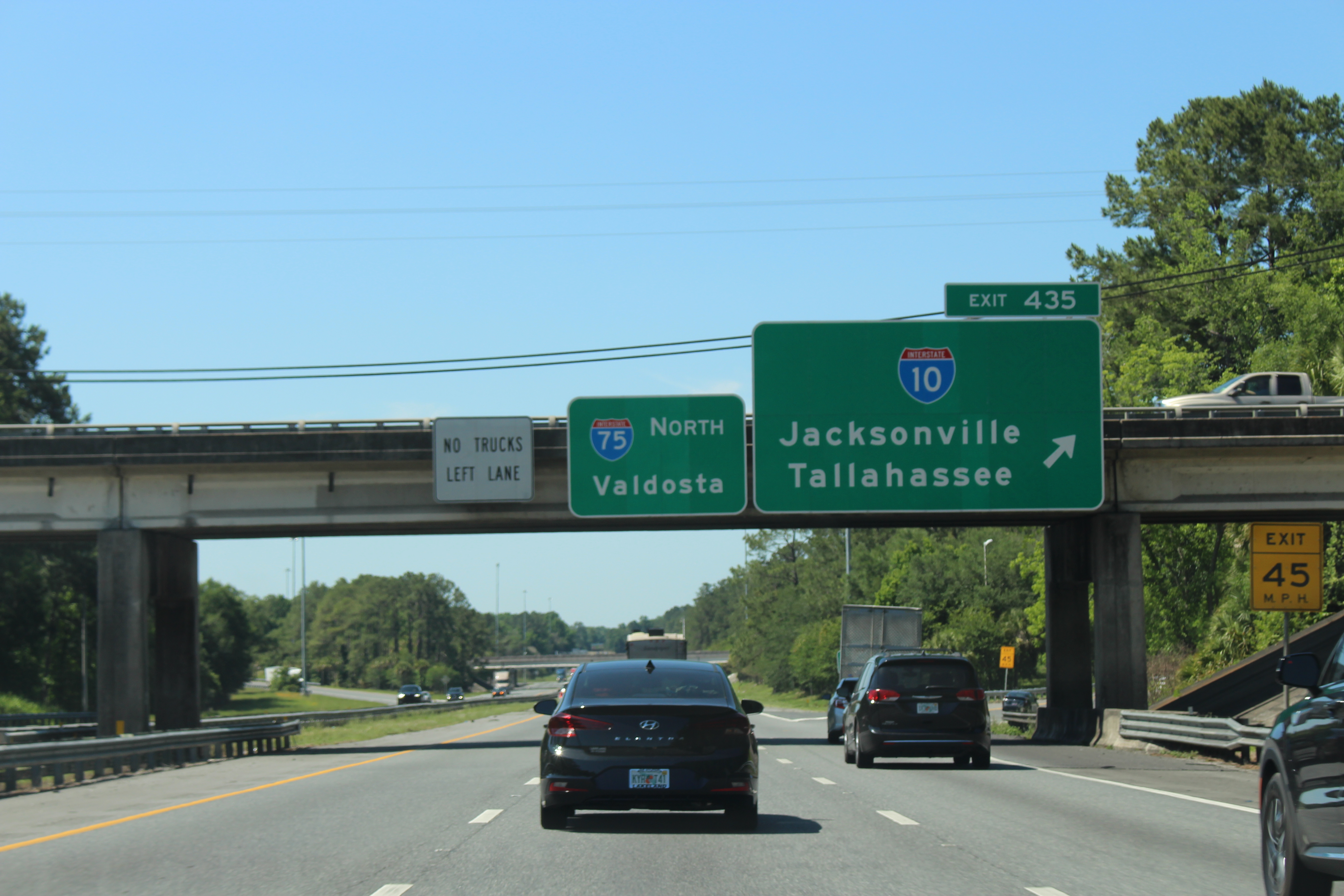
Northbound I-75 at the interchange with I-10

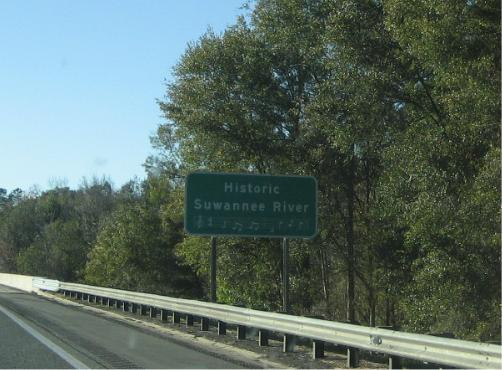
I-75 crossing the Suwannee River, with a snippet of music from "Old Folks at Home"

I-75 runs closest to US 41 except between Tampa and High Springs. It runs closer to US 301 between Ellenton and Temple Terrace, and again from Dade City to Sparr. From Belleview to Lake City, it runs closest to US 441.

== History ==
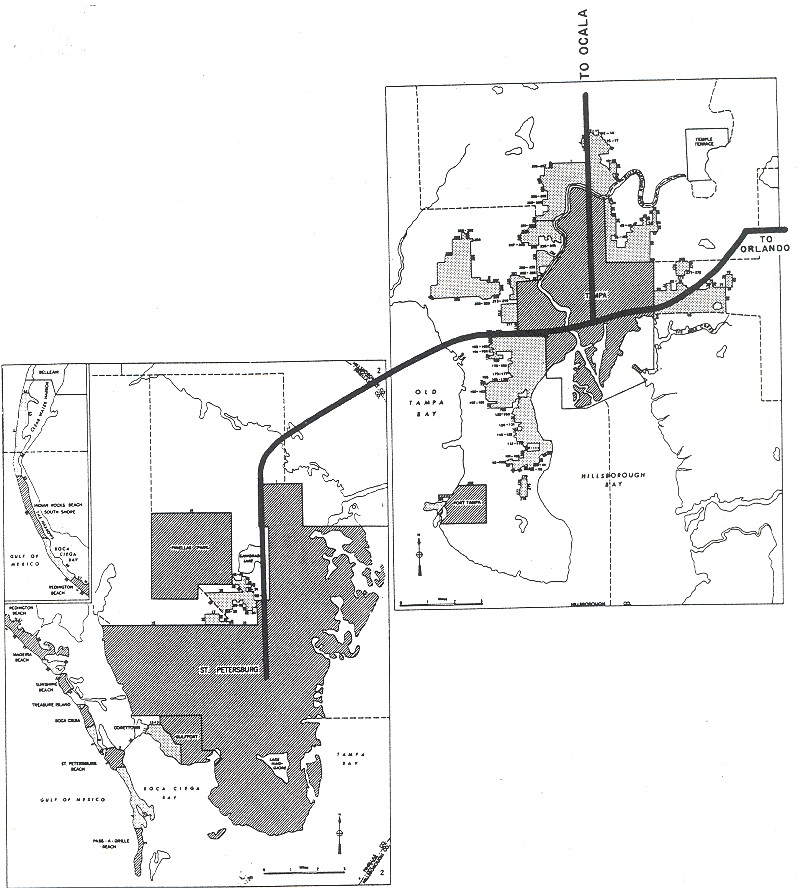
The original plans called for I-75 to end in Tampa.

=== Original route to Tampa ===
Original plans for I-75 called for its southern terminus to be in Tampa, where it would terminate at I-4 (at the current interchange between I-4 and I-275, with I-4, which was completed in the Tampa Bay area by 1962, continuing west along what is now I-275 over the Howard Frankland Bridge into St. Petersburg). Plans for I-75 from Tampa to Sault Ste. Marie, Michigan, were authorized as part of the Federal-Aid Highway Act of 1956, signed into law by President Dwight D. Eisenhower, which created the Interstate Highway System.

Construction of the original route from the Georgia border to Tampa via Gainesville and Ocala lasted through most of the 1960s. The first segment of I-75 to open in Florida was from the Georgia border to SR 6 just south of Jennings, which opened in 1963. It would reach US 90 in Lake City later that year. By mid-1964, I-75 opened from Lake City to the newly completed Florida's Turnpike (known then as the Sunshine State Parkway) in Wildwood. Segments of the original route that are now part of I-275 near Tampa would begin opening in 1966, and construction of the full route would be completed by 1969.

=== Extension to Miami ===
Due to major growth in Southwest Florida (particularly Fort Myers and Naples), it was becoming clear that this part of the state would soon need a freeway. Florida's state government first proposed to build a West Coast Turnpike in 1964 from the Tampa Bay area south to Naples. Plans for the West Coast Turnpike (which would have been tolled) were canceled in 1968, when it was announced that US Secretary of Transportation Alan S. Boyd had approved an extension of I-75 south to Naples and then east to Miami. The federal government would pay for 90 percent of the extension using funds allocated by the Federal-Aid Highway Act of 1968, which was signed into law by President Lyndon B. Johnson.

In preparation for the extension, I-75's designation was extended along the preexisting route of I-4 over the Howard Frankland Bridge into St. Petersburg by the end of 1969 (I-4's designation would be truncated to its current terminus at this time). From St. Petersburg, I-75 was proposed to continue south over the Sunshine Skyway Bridge and continue south along a new freeway roughly parallel to the Tamiami Trail (US 41) along the lower Gulf Coast to Naples.

I-75E and I-75W shields

As the extension was planned in 1968, plans were also made for a freeway bypassing Tampa Bay to the east. The bypass was initially planned to be designated Interstate 75E (I-75E), and was to split from I-75 near Wesley Chapel and rejoin it just north of Ellenton. However, in 1972, it was determined that maintaining the main route of I-75 through Downtown Tampa would eventually require major improvements to the existing infrastructure to handle through traffic. Additionally, neither the 1954 nor 1971 spans of the original Sunshine Skyway Bridge were up to Interstate Highway standards as they both lacked shoulders. As a result, it was decided that I-75 would be re-routed and instead follow the bypass route. FDOT could have renumbered I-75E into what could have possibly been Interstate 75W (I-75W), but, due to a 1973-based American Association of State Highway and Transportation Officials (AASHTO) rule indicating that suffixed routes were to be renumbered to reduce motorist confusion, the option of renumbering I-75E into I-75W was scrapped, with the I-75E designation instead being renumbered to what is known today as I-275, and both the I-75 and I-275 designations were swapped into their current configuration in 1973. I-75 reached as far south as 38th Avenue North in St. Petersburg when the designations were switched. Despite the designation switch, both freeways' hidden designations still reflect the originally planned routing, with I-75's SR 93 designation following I-275, and the current route of I-75 on the bypass being designated SR 93A. Construction on the bypass segment of I-75 began in 1979.

The initially favored proposal for I-75 to reach Miami from Naples was to have I-75 run along the Tamiami Trail (US 41) across the Everglades to just east of the SR 826 (Palmetto Expressway) where it would continue along SR 836 (Dolphin Expressway) and terminate at I-95 and I-395 in Downtown Miami. However, in 1973, planners made the decision to shift I-75's proposed route to cross the Everglades along Alligator Alley over environmental concerns related to upgrading the Tamiami Trail, which runs along the northern border of Everglades National Park. Additionally, Alligator Alley itself needed upgrading, as the then-narrow toll road was dangerous to both motorists and wildlife (most notably the Florida panther) alike, and the Dolphin Expressway, with its left exits and narrow lanes, was not being built to Interstate Highway standards, with the costs to upgrade it being too expensive. By using this route, I-75 would run along the alley to the proposed Port Everglades Expressway, where it would turn south along a new freeway through the western suburbs of Weston and Pembroke Pines to Miami. It was still planned to continue east to I-95, but, due to local opposition, I-75 was not built past its current terminus at SR 826 (Palmetto Expressway) in Hialeah. With this new route, the Port Everglades Expressway was then planned to be built as an Interstate Highway designated I-595 to provide an Interstate connection between I-75 and I-95.

The first piece of the south extension of I-75 to open was a short segment just east of Fort Myers from SR 78 south to Corkscrew Road in 1979. This piece would extend north to Tucker's Grade just south of Punta Gorda in early 1980 and south to Immokalee Road in North Naples by 1981. Also in 1981, the segment from US 301 in Manatee County south to River Road near Venice opened, which would be completed south to the southern segment in Punta Gorda later that year. It would reach Alligator Alley in Naples by 1984. The route from Tampa to Naples would be complete by 1986 as segments of the Tampa bypass were opened from 1982 to 1986. In the Miami area, I-75 was opened from US 27 to its terminus at the Palmetto Expressway in 1986.

=== Alligator Alley ===
The Alligator Alley segment of I-75 extends from a toll plaza just east of Naples to an interchange with I-595 and the Sawgrass Expressway (SR 869) in Sunrise just west of Fort Lauderdale. The highway previously existed as a two-lane tollway connecting the two coasts of Florida. Initially known as the Everglades Parkway (SR 84), it opened for traffic on February 11, 1968, after four years of construction. Built by H. L. Mills Construction Company, it had been called the most controversial roadway ever built in Florida during its initial construction. The name "Alligator Alley" was given by the American Automobile Association (AAA) while it was being planned as they believed it would be useless to cars and merely an "alley for alligators". As alligators frequent the waterways beside the road, and occasionally the roadway itself, the nickname developed a literal meaning. The state moved to officially adopt the "Alligator Alley" name in August 1966.

As a two-lane road, Alligator Alley suffered from poor construction and environmental planning. It was also notorious for high-speed accidents, including both head-on collisions and collisions with wildlife. The need to improve the road was one of the factors considered in the decision to reroute I-75 onto Alligator Alley, which was rebuilt as a four-lane Interstate Highway between 1986 and 1992. Many bridges and culverts designed to let water and wildlife pass underneath the roadway and permit the natural flow of the Everglades' waters were built as part of the upgrade. This helped to reduce the environmental impact of the highway, especially upon the severely endangered Florida panther. The completion of the converted Alligator Alley was the final link of the I-75 extension. The segment was signed I-75 on November 25, 1992, completing the highway from Miami to Sault Ste. Marie, Michigan.

On August 3, 2026, Alligator Alley ceased cash collection and became an all-electronic toll road.

=== Recent history ===
In May 1999, the East Toll Plaza was converted to serve only northbound traffic, while the West Toll Plaza was converted to serve only southbound traffic. This was done to reduce congestion. In January 2000, the West Toll Plaza of Alligator Alley was dedicated to the memory of Edward J. Beck, a toll collector who was murdered on the job on January 30, 1974.

In January 2002, FDOT transitioned existing interchange exit numbers on all Interstate Highways from sequential exits to mileage-based exits.

In April 2008, FDOT proposed leasing a 72-mile (116 km) section of road to private operators. The additional revenue the state would receive was one of primary motives to privatize this section of Alligator Alley. However, the motion failed in May 2009 when no bids were received that met the required terms.

In fall 2016, a six-lane widening was completed between Sumter Boulevard and North River Road.

FDOT contracted Prince Contracting in 2015 to construct the state's first diverging diamond interchange at the University Parkway (exit 213) interchange. The $74.5-million (equivalent to $96.1 million in 2025) project started construction in August 2015 and completed in September 2017.

FDOT implemented express lanes along 28 miles (45 km) of the I-75 and SR 826 (Palmetto Expressway) corridors, from just south of the SR 836 (Dolphin Expressway), in Miami-Dade County, to I-595 in Broward County. The project completed another section of the South Florida managed lanes network, benefiting all motorists by improving mobility, relieving congestion, providing additional travel options, and accommodating future growth in the area. The 75 Express Lanes project extends 15 miles (24 km) along I-75 from Northwest 170th Street in Miami-Dade County to I-595 in Broward County. Work was completed in four segments to minimize the effects on the public. Construction began in early 2014 and was completed in 2018. The total project cost $481 million (equivalent to $607 million in 2025).

In 2015, the Central Florida Expressway Authority (CFX), FDOT, and FTE announced a $68.5-million (equivalent to $90.8 million in 2025) project to make several improvements to I-75's interchange with SR 44 (exit 329) and the adjoining interchange with Florida's Turnpike (exit 328). This included adding a collector–distributor ramp in each direction along I-75 leading to the interchange northbound, and leading from SR 44 to the southbound Turnpike, as well as widening I-75 to six lanes in each direction leading to the interchange, and adding another access point from the northbound Turnpike to SR 44 (exit 307). The project, which was handled by Middlesex Construction, began construction in September 2016. The new northbound offramp to SR 44 was completed on September 19, 2019, and the new southbound onramps to the Turnpike and I-75 were completed in early November 2019. The project overall was completed in January 2020.

Another diverging diamond interchange with SR 56 (exit 275) was initially proposed in May 2018; construction on the revamped intersection began in February 2019, and it was completed in 2022.

An additional interchange was planned for Overpass Road north of SR 54, connecting to CR 530. The interchange opened to traffic the morning of January 18, 2023.

Another diverging diamond interchange with Northwest 49th Street in Ocala (exit 356) was initially proposed in November 2020. The project, which is projected to cost $147.9 million, is scheduled to begin construction in June 2025.

== Services ==
Several rest area facilities exist along I-75 throughout the state. In addition, there are separate facilities for each direction of the Interstate in Hamilton and Suwannee counties, southbound and northbound, respectively, and a welcome center south of the state line. Exit 131 has a single facility accessible from both travel directions on I-75, as well as the intersecting highway. Exit 161 had a rest stop at the interchange's southeast quadrant, but it closed in 2015 because of low usage. Exit 191 also had a rest stop at the interchange's northeast quadrant that closed in the 1990s. Each rest area has restrooms, vending machines, picnic tables, dog walk areas, and nighttime security. The welcome center also has travel information and free orange juice, the state's official state beverage.

Motorist-aid call boxes were installed starting in 1973, initially from the Georgia line to Lake City, eventually being installed on both outside shoulders of the road every one mile (1.6 km) to allow drivers to indicate the need for gasoline, repair (tire or engine), or emergency services (police, ambulance, or fire). The majority of the call boxes were removed in late 2013 because of the rising maintenance cost and the availability of newer technology.

Intelligent transportation systems (ITS) are used throughout the Interstate. ITS is a fiber optic system of traffic cameras, overhead message signs, microwave vehicle detectors, travel time sensors, road and weather information sensors, and highway advisory radios. FDOT has a data-share agreement with Waze which provides real-time information for the state's 5-1-1 service, ITS, and to Waze users.

== Exit list ==
County	Location	mi	km	Old exit	New exit	Destinations	Notes
Miami-Dade	Miami Lakes–Hialeah line	0.000	0.000			SR 924 east (Gratigny Parkway) to I-95	Continuation east
Miami-Dade	Miami Lakes–Hialeah line	0.000	0.000	1	1	SR 826 (Palmetto Expressway) – Miami International Airport	Signed as exits 1A (north) and 1B (south)
Miami-Dade	Miami Lakes–Hialeah line	1.470	2.366	2	2	Northwest 138th Street / Hialeah Gardens Boulevard	
Miami-Dade		4.454	7.168	3A	4	SR 860 east (Northwest 186th Street / Miami Gardens Drive)	Western terminus of SR 860; Park and Ride on west side of interchange
Miami-Dade						I-75 Express north	Southern terminus of express lanes
Miami-Dade–Broward county line	Hialeah–Miramar line	4.923	7.923	3B	5	Florida's Turnpike Extension – Fort Lauderdale, Orlando, Homestead, Key West	No northbound exit to Turnpike south or southbound entrance from Turnpike north; exit 39 on Turnpike
Broward	Miramar	6.966	11.211	4	7	Miramar Parkway (CR 858)	To Memorial Hospital Miramar
Broward	Miramar					I-75 Express south	Southbound exit and northbound entrance
Broward	Pembroke Pines	9.204	14.812	5	9	SR 820 (Pines Boulevard)	Signed as exits 9A (east) and 9B (west); to Memorial Hospital West, Pembroke Lakes Mall, C. B. Smith Park, Broward College/FIU at 75, Keiser University - Pembroke Pines
Broward	Pembroke Pines					I-75 Express south	Southbound exit and northbound entrance
Broward	Pembroke Pines–Davie line	10.867	17.489	6	11	Sheridan Street (CR 822)	To Memorial Hospital Pembroke, Brian Piccolo Park, Broward College - Pines Center
Broward	Davie					I-75 Express north	Northbound exit and southbound entrance
Broward	Davie–Southwest Ranches– Weston tripoint	13.166	21.189	7	13	Griffin Road (CR 818)	Signed as exits 13A (east) and 13B (west)
Broward	Davie–Southwest Ranches– Weston tripoint					I-75 Express south	Southbound exit and northbound entrance
Broward	Davie–Weston line	14.997	24.135	8	15	Royal Palm Boulevard	To Cleveland Clinic Florida
Broward	Davie–Weston– Sunrise tripoint	17.379	27.969	10	19	I-595 east / SR 869 north (Sawgrass Expressway) to Florida's Turnpike / I-95 – Fort Lauderdale, Coral Springs, Fort Lauderdale–Hollywood International Airport, Port Everglades	Western terminus of I-595; southern terminus of SR 869
Broward	Weston	21.119	33.988	11	21	SR 84 west / Indian Trace	Northbound exit and southbound entrance (exit 22 provides full access)
Broward	Weston	22.064	35.509	12	22	SR 84 east / Glades Parkway	
Broward	Weston	23.494	37.810	13	23	US 27 – Miami, South Bay, Hialeah	Unsigned SR 25; to Everglades Holiday Park
Broward		25	40	East Toll Plaza (northbound only)			
Broward		35.3	56.8	Recreational and rest areas			
Broward	Miccosukee Reservation	49.428	79.547	14	49	CR 833 north (Snake Road)	Access to Miccosukee Service Plaza; to Big Cypress Seminole Reservation, Ah-Tah-Thi-Ki Seminole Indian Museum, and Billie's Swamp Safari
Collier	Big Cypress National Preserve	63.0	101.4	Rest area			
Collier	Miles City–Big Cypress National Preserve line	80.048	128.825	14A	80	SR 29 – Everglades City, Immokalee	
Collier		100	160	West Toll Plaza (southbound only)			
Collier		101.284	163.001	15	101	CR 951 (SR 951 south) to SR 84 – Naples, Marco Island	
Collier		104.552	168.260	--	105	CR 886 (Golden Gate Parkway) – Golden Gate, Naples	
Collier	Vineyards	107.134	172.415	16	107	CR 896 (Pine Ridge Road) – Naples, Golden Gate	Diverging diamond interchange
Collier		111.401	179.283	17	111	CR 846 (Immokalee Road) – Naples Park, Ave Maria, Delnor - Wiggins State Park	
Lee	Bonita Springs	115.385	185.694	18	116	CR 865 (Bonita Beach Road) – Bonita Springs, Gulf Beaches	
Lee	Estero	122.748	197.544	19	123	CR 850 (Corkscrew Road) / Miromar Outlets Boulevard – Hertz Arena, Estero	To Florida Gulf Coast University, Coconut Point Mall, Koreshan State Historic Site
Lee	Three Oaks	127.068	204.496	20	128	CR 840 (Alico Road) – San Carlos Park, Southwest Florida International Airport	To Hertz Arena and Florida Gulf Coast University
Lee		130.808	210.515	21	131	CR 876 (Daniels Parkway) – Cape Coral	Rest area northeast of this interchange; future diverging diamond interchange; to Gulf Coast Medical Center
Lee	Fort Myers	135.426	217.947	22	136	SR 884 (Colonial Boulevard) – Fort Myers, Lehigh Acres	Diverging diamond interchange; to Lee Memorial Hospital
Lee	Fort Myers	136.985	220.456	23	138	SR 82 (M.L. King Jr. Boulevard) – Fort Myers, Immokalee	
Lee		138.494	222.884	24	139	CR 810 (Luckett Road) – Fort Myers	
Lee		140.416	225.978	25	141	SR 80 (Palm Beach Boulevard) – Fort Myers, LaBelle	
Lee	Caloosahatchee River	140.926– 141.666	226.798– 227.989	Bridge			
Lee	North Fort Myers	142.777	229.777	26	143	SR 78 (Bayshore Road, Pine Island Road) – North Fort Myers, Cape Coral	
Charlotte		157.004	252.673	27	158	CR 762 (Tuckers Grade) – Tropical Gulf Acres, North Fort Myers, Cape Coral	
Charlotte		158.8	255.6	Weigh station			
Charlotte		160.270	257.930	28	161	CR 768 (North Jones Loop Road) – Punta Gorda, Punta Gorda Airport	
Charlotte	Solana	163.611	263.306	29	164	US 17 – Punta Gorda, Arcadia	To Bayfront Health Punta Gorda
Charlotte	Peace River	164.304– 165.832	264.422– 266.881	Bridge			
Charlotte		166.395	267.787	30	167	CR 776 (Harborview Road) – Port Charlotte, Charlotte Harbor	
Charlotte		169.573	272.901	31	170	CR 769 (Kings Highway) – Arcadia, Port Charlotte	
DeSoto	No major junctions						
Sarasota	North Port	178.559	287.363	32	179	CR 779 (Toledo Blade Boulevard) – North Port, Port Charlotte	
Sarasota	North Port	181.505	292.104	33	182	CR 771 (Sumter Boulevard) – North Port	
Sarasota		190.580	306.709	34	191	SR 777 south (River Road) – North Port, Englewood	
Sarasota		192.821	310.315	35	193	CR 765 (Jacaranda Boulevard) – Englewood, Venice	
Sarasota	Venice	195.120	314.015	35A	195	CR 762 (Laurel Road) – Nokomis, Venice, Laurel	To Sarasota Memorial Hospital - Venice campus
Sarasota		199.319	320.773	36	200	SR 681 south – Venice, Osprey	Southbound exit and northbound entrance; former I-75 south
Sarasota		204.884	329.729	37	205	SR 72 (Clark Road) – Siesta Key, Arcadia	
Sarasota	Lake Sarasota	206.906	332.983	38	207	SR 758 (Bee Ridge Road)	To HCA Florida Sarasota Doctors Hospital, Suncoast Technical College, Marie Selby Botanical Gardens
Sarasota	Fruitville	209.622	337.354	39	210	SR 780 (Fruitville Road) – Sarasota, St. Armands	Future diverging diamond interchange; to Lakewood Ranch Medical Center, Downtown Sarasota Historic District, Mote Aquarium, Nathan Benderson Park
Sarasota–Manatee county line	Lakewood Ranch	213.139	343.014	40	213	CR 610 (University Parkway) – Sarasota-Bradenton International Airport, Sarasota	To New College of Florida, USF Sarasota- Manatee, University Town Center, Ringling Museum, Lakewood Ranch Medical Center
Manatee		216.826	348.948	41	217	SR 70 – Bradenton, Arcadia	
Manatee		220.425	354.740	42	220	SR 64 – Bradenton, Zolfo Springs, Wauchula	To Manatee Memorial Hospital
Manatee	Manatee River	223.498– 224.226	359.685– 360.857	Bridge			
Manatee	Ellenton	224.103	360.659	43	224	US 301 – Ellenton, Palmetto	
Manatee		227.874	366.728	44	228	I-275 north – St. Petersburg	
Manatee		229.290	369.006	45	229	CR 683 (Moccasin Wallow Road) – Parrish	
Hillsborough	Ruskin	237.2	381.7	Rest area			
Hillsborough	Ruskin–Sun City Center line	240.126	386.445	46	240	SR 674 – Ruskin, Sun City Center	Signed as exits 240A (east) and 240B (west) southbound; to South Bay Hospital
Hillsborough	Gibsonton	245.966	395.844	47	246	CR 672 (Big Bend Road) – Apollo Beach	To St. Joseph Hospital South
Hillsborough	Gibsonton–Riverview line	250.158	402.590	48	250	Gibsonton Drive – Gibsonton, Riverview	
Hillsborough	Palm River-Clair Mel–Brandon line	253.741	408.357	49	254	US 301 – Riverview	To Brandon Town Center
Hillsborough	Brandon	255.587	411.327	50	256	SR 618 west (Selmon Expressway) – Tampa, Port of Tampa	Exit 15 on SR 618
Hillsborough	Brandon	256.559	412.892	51	257	SR 60 – Brandon	To HCA Florida Brandon Hospital, Hillsborough Community College
Hillsborough	Mango	259.307	417.314	52	260	SR 574 (Martin Luther King Jr. Boulevard)	Diverging diamond interchange; access to St. Joseph's Hospital, St. Joseph's Children's Hospital, and St. Joseph's Women's Hospital; To Florida State Fairgrounds
Hillsborough	Mango	260.729	419.603	53	261	I-4 – Tampa, Orlando	Exit 9 on I-4
Hillsborough	Temple Terrace	264.803	426.159	54	265	SR 582 (Fowler Avenue) – Temple Terrace	To University of South Florida, Museum of Science & Industry (Tampa), Busch Gardens
Hillsborough	Temple Terrace–Tampa line	265.814	427.786	55	266	CR 582A (Fletcher Avenue / Morris Bridge Road)	To AdventHealth Tampa and Moffitt Cancer Center
Hillsborough	Tampa	269.849	434.280	56	270	CR 581 (Bruce B. Downs Boulevard)	To Veterans Hospital
Pasco	Wesley Chapel	273.708	440.490	57	274	I-275 south – Tampa, St. Petersburg, Airport	Southbound exit and northbound entrance
Pasco	Wesley Chapel	275.200	442.891	57A	275	SR 56 – Land o' Lakes, Tarpon Springs	To AdventHealth Center Ice Sports Complex, Pasco–Hernando State College
Pasco	Wesley Chapel	277.0	445.8	Rest area			
Pasco	Wesley Chapel	278.670	448.476	58	279	SR 54 / CR 54 – Zephyrhills, Wesley Chapel	To BayCare Hospital Wesley Chapel
Pasco	Wesley Chapel				282	Overpass Road	Opened January 18, 2023
Pasco		285.295	459.138	59	285	SR 52 – Dade City, San Antonio, New Port Richey	
Pasco		292.620	470.926	60	293	CR 41 – Dade City	
Hernando		300.969	484.363	61	301	US 98 / SR 50 – Orlando, Brooksville	
Sumter	Withlacoochee State Forest	306.0	492.5	Rest area			
Sumter		307.125	494.270	62	309	To CR 476 (via CR 476B north) – Webster	
Sumter	Bushnell	313.036	503.783	63	314	SR 48 – Bushnell	
Sumter	Lake Panasoffkee	319.468	514.134	64	321	CR 470 (CR 475) – Sumterville, Lake Panasoffkee	Signed CR 475 to CR 470 northbound; former SR 470
Sumter		326.797	525.929	65	328	Florida's Turnpike south – Orlando	Left southbound exit and right northbound entrance; northern terminus of Turnpike
Sumter		328.004	527.871	66	329	SR 44 – Inverness, Wildwood	
Marion		337.1	542.5	Weigh station			
Marion	Marion Oaks	339.357	546.142	67	341	CR 484 – Belleview, Dunnellon	
Marion		344.6	554.6	Rest area			
Marion	Ocala	348.340	560.599	68	350	SR 200 – Ocala, Silver Springs, Hernando, Dunnellon	To AdventHealth Ocala, HCA Florida Ocala Hospital, College of Central Florida
Marion	Ocala	350.816	564.584	69	352	SR 40 – Ocala, Silver Springs	
Marion	Ocala	352.195	566.803	70	354	US 27 – Ocala, Williston, Silver Springs	
Marion	Ocala				356	Northwest 49th Street	Proposed diverging diamond interchange; construction slated for late 2026 to be completed in 2028
Marion		356.478	573.696	71	358	SR 326 east CR 326 west – Silver Springs, Morriston	
Marion	Irvine	366.723	590.183	72	368	CR 318 – Irvine, Orange Lake	
Alachua		373.650	601.331	73	374	CR 234 – Micanopy	
Alachua	Paynes Prairie Preserve State Park	381.5	614.0	Rest area			
Alachua	Gainesville	382.390	615.397	74	382	SR 121 (Williston Road) to SR 331 – Gainesville, Williston	To University of Florida
Alachua	Gainesville	383.694	617.496	75	384	SR 24 (Archer Road) – Gainesville, Archer	To UF Health Shands Hospital, University of Florida, Florida Museum of Natural History
Alachua	Gainesville	387.218	623.167	76	387	SR 26 (Newberry Road) – Gainesville, Newberry	To HCA Florida North Florida Hospital, University of Florida, The Oaks Mall
Alachua		389.815	627.346	77	390	SR 222 (NW 39th Avenue) – Gainesville	To Gainesville Regional Airport, Santa Fe College
Alachua	Alachua	398.854	641.893	78	399	US 441 – Alachua, High Springs	
Alachua	Traxler	404.225	650.537	79	404	CR 236 – High Springs, Lake Butler	
Columbia		411.8	662.7	Rest area			
Columbia	Ellisville	413.709	665.800	80	414	US 41 / US 441 – Lake City, High Springs	
Columbia		422.632	680.160	81	423	SR 47 – Fort White, Lake City	
Columbia	Lake City	427.351	687.755	82	427	US 90 – Lake City, Live Oak	To HCA Florida Lake City Hospital
Columbia		434.702	699.585	83	435	I-10 – Jacksonville, Tallahassee	Exit 296 on I-10
Suwannee		439.386	707.123	84	439	SR 136 – White Springs, Live Oak	
Hamilton		445.4	716.8	Inspection station			
Hamilton		448.5	721.8	Weigh station			
Hamilton		451.262	726.236	85	451	US 129 – Jasper, Live Oak	
Hamilton		460.350	740.862	86	460	SR 6 – Jasper, Madison	
Hamilton	Jennings	466.825	751.282	87	467	SR 143 – Jennings	
Hamilton		469.0	754.8	Florida Welcome Center (southbound only)			
Hamilton		470.808	757.692			I-75 north – Valdosta	Continuation into Georgia
1.000 mi = 1.609 km; 1.000 km = 0.621 mi: Concurrency terminus; Electronic toll collection; Incomplete access; Unopened

=== Express lanes ===
All exits are unnumbered.

County	Location	mi	km	Destinations	Notes
Miami-Dade	Hialeah			To SR 826 south – Miami	Express lanes continue on Palmetto Expressway southbound
Miami-Dade	Hialeah			Northwest 138th Street I-75 south to SR 826 / SR 924 – Miami International Airport	Access via local lanes to exit 2; southbound exit northbound entrance
Miami-Dade–Broward county line	Hialeah–Miramar line			Florida's Turnpike Extension – Fort Lauderdale, Orlando, Homestead, Key West	Southbound exit and northbound entrance; exit 39 on Turnpike
Broward	Miramar			SR 820 (Pines Boulevard) / Sheridan Street	Access via local lanes to exits 9 and 11
Broward	Davie–Weston line			Griffin Road, Royal Palm Boulevard	Access via local lanes to exits 13 and 15
Broward	Davie–Weston– Sunrise tripoint			I-75 north / SR 869 north / I-595 east to Florida's Turnpike / I-95 – Naples, Coral Springs, Fort Lauderdale, Fort Lauderdale–Hollywood International Airport, Port Everglades	Northbound exit and southbound entrance; access via local lanes to exit 19
Broward	Davie–Weston– Sunrise tripoint			I-595 Express east to Florida's Turnpike / I-95 – Fort Lauderdale, Fort Lauderdale–Hollywood International Airport, Port Everglades	Continues as peak-direction I-595 express lanes
1.000 mi = 1.609 km; 1.000 km = 0.621 mi: Electronic toll collection; Incomplete access

Interstate 75
Previous state: Terminus	Florida	Next state: Georgia
