= Wesley Chapel, Florida =

- CDP
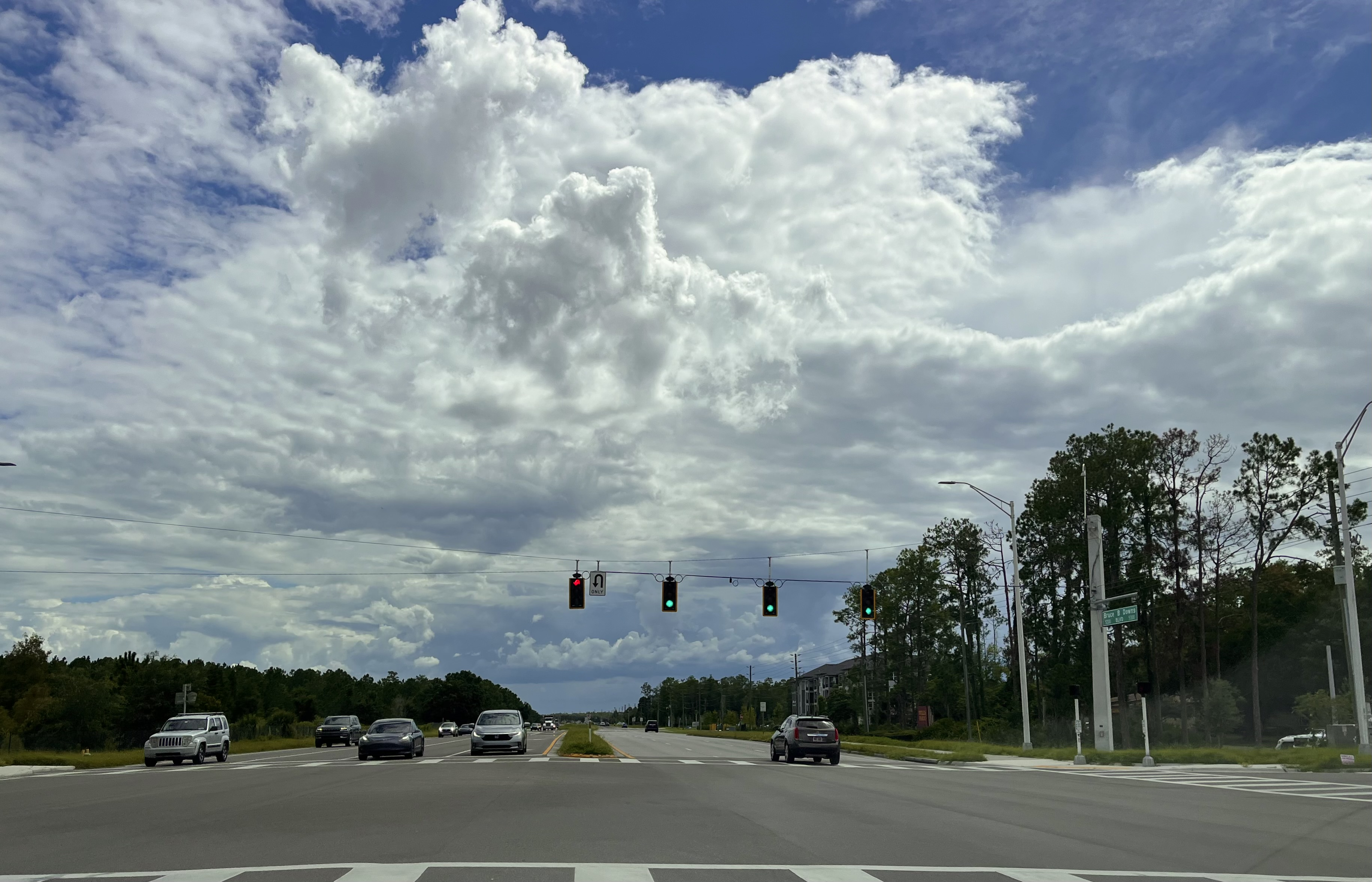
- Bruce B. Downs Bl. in Wesley Chapel

- Location in Pasco County and the state of Florida
- Coordinates: 28°12′43″N 82°21′02″W
- Country: United States
- State: Florida
- County: Pasco

Area
  - Total: 44.05 sq mi (114.09 km^{2})
  - Land: 43.92 sq mi (113.75 km^{2})
  - Water: 0.13 sq mi (0.33 km^{2})
- Elevation: 75 ft (23 m)

Population (2020)
  - Total: 64,866
  - Density: 1,476.9/sq mi (570.23/km^{2})
- Time zone: UTC-5 (Eastern (EST))
  - Summer (DST): UTC-4 (EDT)
- ZIP codes: 33543-33544-33545
- Area code: 813
- FIPS code: 12-75875
- GNIS feature ID: 2402996

Wesley Chapel is a census-designated place in Pasco County, Florida, United States. The population was 64,866 at the 2020 census. It is a suburb in the Tampa Bay area.

== History ==
Wesley Chapel originated in the mid-1800s as a cohesive community of settlers. Evidence of Native American presence in the area has been documented as early as 10,000 B.C. Lumber harvesting and turpentine production became prominent industries, while cash crop farming, citrus, and livestock ranching provided sustenance for the pioneer settlement. Charcoal kilns, alligator hunting, and moonshine stills supplemented incomes and spawned legends. The community was also identified by the monikers Gatorville, Double Branch, and Godwin.

From 1897 to 1902, Wesley Chapel had a post office, two sawmills, and a general store. Primitive roads left residents with an informal town nucleus, and services shifted to surrounding towns until the late 20th century, when postal service and incorporation emerged. The lumber trusts of John D. Rockefeller, Otto Hermann Kahn, and Edwin Wiley morphed into sizable ranches. The pioneer Boyett(e), Gillett(e), Godwin, and Kersey families received land grants in the area in the 1840s. The real influx of settlers, however, began around the Civil War when the Stanleys and Coopers arrived.

The population was 44,092 at the 2010 census, making it the most populous community in Pasco County. In 2003, some residents of Wesley Chapel started a movement to incorporate the community as a city (including areas not in the official CDP), but the plans never materialized.

Originally called Double Branch for the area's twin creeks, the community was named for the Methodist church. A popular nickname for the area was "Gatorville". Wesley Chapel has been a major catalyst in the rapid growth of Pasco County, the 38th fastest-growing county in the nation and retains much in the way of wildlife.

== Geography ==
According to the United States Census Bureau, the CDP has a total area of 6.1 square miles (16 km^{2}), of which 6.1 square miles (16 km^{2}) is land and 0.04 square miles (0.10 km^{2}) (0.49%) is water. The elevation is about 100 feet (30 m), combined with an inland location, creates more temperature variation in the humid subtropical climate.

Residents choose the area because of its proximity to I-75 and I-275, 25 miles (40 kilometers) north of Tampa and other major locales. Adjacent to its south is the region of New Tampa, part of incorporated Tampa.

== Demographics ==
Historical population
Census	Pop.	Note	%±
2000	5,691		—
2010	44,092		674.8%
2020	64,866		47.1%
U.S. Decennial Census

=== Racial and ethnic composition ===
Wesley Chapel racial composition (Hispanics excluded from racial categories) (NH = Non-Hispanic)
Race	Pop 2010	Pop 2020	% 2010	% 2020
White (NH)	26,741	33,105	60.65%	51.04%
Black or African American (NH)	4,675	7,215	10.60%	11.12%
Native American or Alaska Native (NH)	83.0	108	0.19%	0.17%
Asian (NH)	2,488	4,826	5.64%	7.44%
Pacific Islander or Native Hawaiian (NH)	44	61	0.10%	0.09%
Some other race (NH)	136	537	0.31%	0.83%
Two or more races/Multiracial (NH)	1,054	3,280	2.39%	5.06%
Hispanic or Latino (any race)	8,871	15,734	20.12%	24.26%
Total	44,092	64,866	100%	100%

=== 2020 census ===
As of the 2020 census, Wesley Chapel had a population of 64,866. The median age was 37.6 years. 26.6% of residents were under the age of 18 and 12.0% of residents were 65 years of age or older. For every 100 females there were 92.5 males, and for every 100 females age 18 and over there were 89.2 males age 18 and over. Of the residents, 98.2% lived in urban areas, while 1.8% lived in rural areas.

There were 22,487 households in Wesley Chapel, of which 42.4% had children under the age of 18 living in them. Of all households, 58.8% were married-couple households, 12.2% were households with a male householder and no spouse or partner present, and 22.4% were households with a female householder and no spouse or partner present. About 17.7% of all households were made up of individuals and 5.8% had someone living alone who was 65 years of age or older. There were 24,256 housing units, of which 7.3% were vacant. The homeowner vacancy rate was 2.5% and the rental vacancy rate was 10.1%.

Racial composition as of the 2020 census
Race	Number	Percent
White	36,804	56.7%
Black or African American	7,726	11.9%
American Indian and Alaska Native	210	0.3%
Asian	4,913	7.6%
Native Hawaiian and Other Pacific Islander	70	0.1%
Some other race	4,491	6.9%
Two or more races	10,652	16.4%
Hispanic or Latino (of any race)	15,734	24.3%

=== 2010 census ===
As of the 2010 United States census, there were 44,092 people, 14,491 households, and 10,650 families residing in the CDP. In 2010, there were 15,745 households, out of which 40.19% had children under the age of 18 living with them, 58.8% were married couples living together, 10.75% had a female householder with no husband present, and 24.8% were non-families. 18.58% of all households were made up of individuals, and 3.13% had someone living alone who was 65 years of age or older. The average household size was 2.80 and the average family size was 3.22.

In 2010, in the CDP, the population was spread out, with 28.27% under the age of 18, 4.69% from 20 to 24, 32.58% from 25 to 44, 23.36% from 45 to 64, and 8.86% who were 65 years of age or older. The median age was 35.2 years.

== Growth ==
The area has three middle schools and three high schools, most of which are new as well as three charter schools. Three planned malls have now opened, including the Shops at Wiregrass, Tampa Premium Outlets, and a big box mall called The Grove on the northern perimeter. The Grove also hosts a small outlet mall called KRATE at the Grove. Wiregrass is known for its well-reviewed restaurants, bars, and shops. By 2017, Cypress Creek Town Center and Tampa Premium Outlets opened. Two schools were built in 2007 and 2008, Dr. John Long Middle School and Wiregrass Ranch High School.

In 2016, Wiregrass Elementary opened its doors next to John Long Middle School. In 2017, Cypress Creek Middle School and Cypress Creek High School opened as the 3rd middle school and high school in the town. Pasco Hernando State College-Porter Campus has been open since 2013 next to WRHS. Wesley Chapel has one of the highest concentrations of top ranked public schools in Florida according to Public School Review.

In July 2007, a new county park opened at the southwest corner of Boyette and Overpass roads. In March 2008, SR 56 was extended east from its then terminus at Bruce B. Downs Boulevard to a temporary terminus at Meadow Pointe Boulevard. In late 2019, it was extended further east to its final terminus at US 301 in Zephyrhills. Wesley Chapel was also listed as one of the "8 boomtowns of 2008" by the Gadberry Group's annual list. Wesley Chapel has a new hospital called Advent Health (formerly Florida Hospital) at Wesley Chapel, and Pasco-Hernando State College's latest campus, Porter Campus at Wiregrass Ranch.

A massive 800-acre project is set to launch in Pasco County, which will become the largest sports park in the United States. This development, part of the Trinity Development Initiative and unveiled at the IAAPA 2024 Expo, will feature a range of sports facilities including professional playing fields and an ice arena. It will have hotels, retail outlets, restaurants, and health care services. Plans for a massive development in Trinity, Florida have sparked significant opposition among local residents. Many community members are concerned that the development will disrupt the area's character, increase traffic congestion, and exacerbate flooding issues. A petition with hundreds of signatures has been initiated to halt the project, reflecting a broader tension between rapid growth and the preservation of community values in Pasco County.

== See also ==
- Connected City, Florida
