= Florida State Road 56 =

Highway in Florida

State Road 56
- SR 56 highlighted in red

Route information
- Maintained by FDOT
- Length: 6.732 mi (10.834 km)
- Existed: March 28, 2002–present

Major junctions
- West end: SR 54 / CR 54 in Wesley Chapel
- I-75 in Wesley Chapel
- East end: US 301 in Zephyrhills

Location
- Country: United States
- State: Florida
- Counties: Pasco

Highway system
- Florida State Highway System; Interstate; US; State; Former; Pre‑1945; Toll; Scenic
← SR 55	→ SR 57

State Road 56 (SR 56) is a six-lane state highway 6.7 miles (10.8 km) in length that runs from SR 54 east to US Highway 301 (US 301) in Zephyrhills.

== Route description ==
SR 56 begins at a three-way intersection with SR 54. At this point, SR 54 makes a sharp northward turn while SR 56 continues straight on the same roadway. The state road at the beginning of its route is a six-lane avenue that passes through a rural area of Wesley Chapel. After 0.9 miles (1.4 km), SR 56 comes to an interchange with Interstate 75 (I-75). The on-ramps allow access to both northbound and southbound I-75. After its intersection with I-75, SR 56 enters the commercial district of Wesley Chapel. It travels 2.1 miles (3.4 km) through the town before reaching a four-way intersection with SR 581. After this intersection, the speed limit increases to 55 miles per hour (89 km/h), and SR 56 travels another 3.8 miles (6.1 km) through rural Wesley Chapel before approaching an intersection with Meadow Pointe Boulevard. The road continues to pass through rural surroundings, and crosses a pair of bridges over the New River (a tributary to the Hillsborough River), entering Zephyrhills, where it has one last major intersection with Morris Bridge Road (County Road 579, CR 579) before terminating at US 301 across from Festival Park.

== History ==
The first segment of SR 56, which stretched from SR 54 to Bruce B. Downs Boulevard (SR/CR 581), opened on March 28, 2002, after three years of construction. The highway allows a more-direct access to I-75 two miles (3.2 km) north of the northern terminus of I-275, as opposed to SR 54, which parallelled I-75 for about three miles (4.8 km) before meeting at its interchange.

The first phase of expansion, from Bruce B. Downs to Meadow Pointe Boulevard, began construction in March 2008 to mark the imminent opening of the Shops at Wiregrass. On July 31, 2010, after numerous delays, this extension of SR 56 opened for vehicular traffic. An extension to US 301 in Zephyrhills was being planned by the Florida Department of Transportation (FDOT), and has been part of the plan since the highway's conception. The project was previously expected to be completed by the end of 2019, but finally reached US 301 on July 10, 2019.

A diverging diamond interchange with I-75 was initially proposed in May 2018; construction on the revamped interchange began in February 2019 and was completed in 2022.

== Major intersections ==
The entire route is in Pasco County.

Location	mi	km	Destinations	Notes
Wesley Chapel	0.000	0.000	SR 54 west (Wesley Chapel Boulevard) CR 54 east (Wesley Chapel Boulevard)	Western terminus
Wesley Chapel	0.880	1.416	I-75 – Ocala, Tampa, St. Petersburg	Exit 275 on I-75; diverging diamond interchange
Wesley Chapel	2.950	4.748	SR 581 north to SR 54 CR 581 south	Original eastern terminus
Wesley Chapel	6.732	10.834	Meadow Pointe Boulevard to SR 54	Temporary eastern terminus
Zephyrhills			CR 579 (Morris Bridge Road)	
Zephyrhills			US 301 (Gall Boulevard)	Permanent eastern terminus
1.000 mi = 1.609 km; 1.000 km = 0.621 mi
