= Tampa Bay Executive Airport =

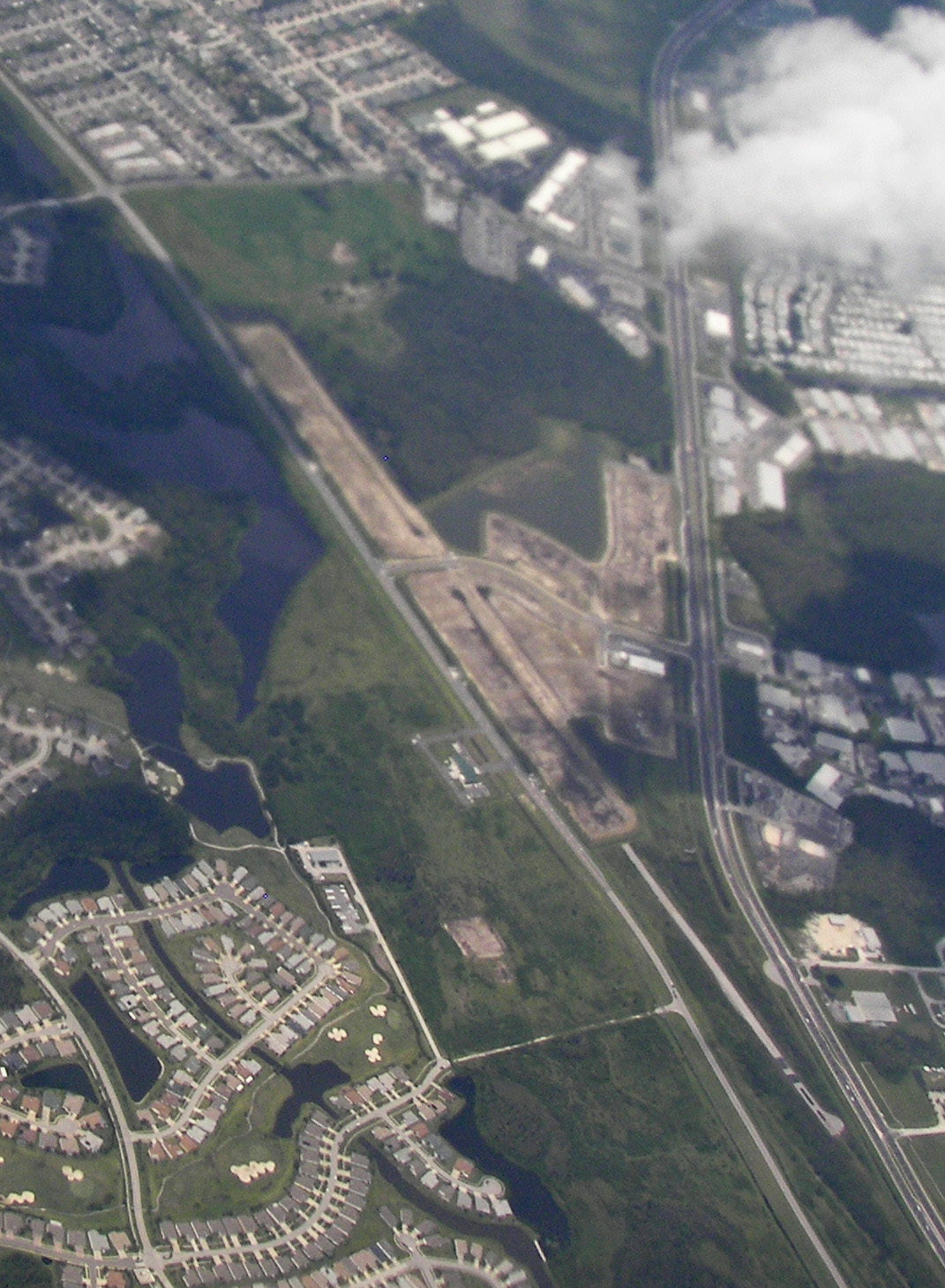
- IATA: none; ICAO: KRRF; FAA LID: 3FD1

Summary
- Airport type: Private (post- 2001)
- Owner/Operator: Seven Eagles, Inc.
- Serves: Tampa Bay, Florida
- Location: Odessa, Florida
- Elevation AMSL: 41 ft / 12.5 m
- Coordinates: 28°11′16″N 082°37′32″W

Map
- Interactive map of Tampa Bay Executive Airport

Runways
Direction	Length		Surface
Direction	ft	m	Surface
8/26	5,001	1,524	Asphalt

Statistics (1997)
- Aircraft operations: 85,000
- Based aircraft: 106
- Source: Federal Aviation Administration

The Tampa Bay Executive Airport was a private airport located on State Road 54 in the town of Odessa, Florida. It was owned and subsequently sold by Dr. James P. Gills. The airport was permanently closed on October 1, 2004, after which the hangars and other buildings were removed from the airpark. The runway remained as of March 2007, marked with several of the standard FAA Xs. Most of it has been cleared in favor of new construction, with about 500 feet remaining on the east end. An industrial park has been slated for construction on the site. As of 2017, the last remaining portion of the runway was removed.

Most of the businesses that were based at Tampa Bay Executive have been relocated to other airports in the region. Hoover's aircraft Refinishing (permanently closed) Jensen Aviation (flight school) and JJ Aeronautics (maintenance) both moved to Zephyrhills Municipal Airport, while Bayflite operations were repositioned to Community Hospital in New Port Richey. However, Bayflite did remain at the airport for nearly a year after the airport was closed. Most of the 100+ based customers were able to successfully find hangar/tie-down space at several nearby airports, but some were forced to sell their aircraft.

Because of the airport's close proximity to residential areas and busy highways, it was no secret that several Pasco County officials were determining the best way to close the airport. It is rumored that the airport's ownership group was given a purchase offer for the property that far exceeded its actual value, which complemented the fact that the owners were quoted as saying that they were "...tired of being involved in a business that attracts so many lawsuits." The county worked to keep Bayflite on-site due to its centralized location and shorter response times, but the medevac service was unable to continue operating there when demolition of the vacant airport began.

== See also ==
- List of airports in Florida
- Resources for this airport:
  - FAA airport information for 3FD1
  - AirNav airport information for 3FD1
  - FlightAware airport information and live flight tracker
  - SkyVector aeronautical chart for 3FD1
