= Florida State Road 581 =

State highway in Florida, United States

State Road 581
- Bruce B. Downs Boulevard
- SR 581 in red, CR 581 in blue

Route information
- Maintained by FDOT
- Length: 3.505 mi (5.641 km) CR 581: 12.554 miles (20.204 km)

Major junctions
- South end: SR 56 in Wesley Chapel
- North end: SR 54 in Wesley Chapel

Location
- Country: United States
- State: Florida
- Counties: Pasco

Highway system
- Florida State Highway System; Interstate; US; State; Former; Pre‑1945; Toll; Scenic
← SR 580	→ SR 582

State Road 581 (SR 581), also known as Bruce B. Downs Boulevard, is a 3.5-mile-long (5.6 km) north–south road in Pasco and Hillsborough County extending from State Road 56, north to SR 54 in Wesley Chapel. SR 581, along with County Road 581 (CR 581), which extends 12.6 miles (20.3 km) to the south of SR 581's southern terminus, forms the major thoroughfare through New Tampa, a part of the city of Tampa annexed during the 1980s, to Wesley Chapel. The portion of the road north of State Road 582 was renamed in 1984 from 30th Street by Hillsborough's Board of County Commissioners in honor of Bruce Barkley Downs, a deputy county administrator for public works.

== Route description ==
State Road 581 begins at the intersection between the northern terminus of County Road 581 and State Road 56. State Road 581 takes Bruce B. Downs Boulevard northbound through a rapidly developing area, which is sparsely populated, ending at State Road 54.

=== County Road 581 ===
County Road 581 is a 12.6-mile long county road, extending from State Road 580 (Busch Boulevard) in Tampa to State Road 56 in Wesley Chapel, where it becomes State Road 581. The road begins at the intersection with State Road 580, at the southwest corner of Busch Gardens Tampa Bay, where County Road 581 heads south as 30th Street, with residential areas to the west and Busch Gardens to the east. North of Bougainvillea Avenue, the road passes by a Yuengling brewing plant and a more commercial area, heading towards State Road 582 (Fowler Avenue), where the name changes to Bruce B. Downs Boulevard and forms the western boundary of the University of South Florida. Just north of the shopping centers, CR 581 passes through medical centers on both sides of the road, intersecting CR 582A (Fletcher Avenue), then leaving the medical area to residential areas, where the road starts to curve to the northeast, and enters a more sparsely populated area with newer developments. It then has an interchange with I-75, continuing to the northeast and crossing into Pasco County, where it terminates at State Road 54 in Wesley Chapel.

== Major intersections ==
County	Location	mi	km	Destinations	Notes
Hillsborough	Tampa	0.000	0.000	SR 580 (East Busch Boulevard)	
Hillsborough	Tampa	1.5	2.4	SR 582 (East Fowler Avenue)	
Hillsborough	Tampa	2.5	4.0	CR 582A (East Fletcher Avenue)	
Hillsborough	University	3.3	5.3	East Bearss Avenue (CR 678 west)	
Hillsborough	New Tampa	7.7	12.4	I-75 (SR 93A) – Ocala, Naples, Fort Myers, Atlanta	I-75 exit 270
Pasco	Wesley Chapel	12.554	20.204	SR 56 to I-75 / SR 54 west	south end of state maintenance
Pasco	Wesley Chapel	16.059	25.844	SR 54 east / CR 54 west to I-75 – Land o' Lakes, Zephyrhills	
1.000 mi = 1.609 km; 1.000 km = 0.621 mi: Route transition
