= Trinity, Florida =

- CDP
- Location in Pasco County and the state of Florida
- Coordinates: 28°10′53″N 82°37′43″W
- Country: United States
- State: Florida
- County: Pasco

Area
  - Total: 6.27 sq mi (16.23 km^{2})
  - Land: 6.19 sq mi (16.02 km^{2})
  - Water: 0.081 sq mi (0.21 km^{2})
- Elevation: 33 ft (10 m)

Population (2020)
  - Total: 11,924
  - Density: 1,927.5/sq mi (744.22/km^{2})
- Time zone: UTC-5 (Eastern (EST))
  - Summer (DST): UTC-4 (EDT)
- ZIP code: 34655
- Area code: 727
- FIPS code: 12-72442
- GNIS feature ID: 2402938

Trinity is a census-designated place (CDP) in Pasco County, Florida, United States. The population was 11,924 in 2020, according to the most recent census. The Trinity Community is named after Trinity College of Florida, a Bible college founded in 1932, when it relocated to the first occupied site in the communities developed by James Gills in the late 1980s. The main plaza is found near the high school, known as Mitchell Ranch Plaza. Trinity is located at the junction where Pasco, Hillsborough and Pinellas Counties meet. The community of Longleaf is located in Trinity and it is believed that the “Welcome Plank” originated in Longleaf.

== Geography ==
According to the United States Census Bureau, the CDP has a total area of 4.7 square miles (12 km^{2}), all land.

Trinity is a community just north of the Pinellas and Hillsborough county borders in West Pasco County. It is currently considered part of the New Port Richey area.

The town of Trinity consists of higher priced single family homes and two luxury apartment complexes. A majority of Trinity is the Trinity Communities, which is made up of Champions Club, Trinity Oaks, Thousand Oaks, Wyndtree, Chelsea Place, Natures Hideaway, Foxwood, Trinity West and East, Heritage Springs and The Villages Of Trinity Lakes. Pasco County Fire-Rescue Station #17 covers most of Trinity and Station #15 has some areas. The Pasco County Sheriff's office is the primary law enforcement agency, with the Florida Highway Patrol covering some major roadways.

== Demographics ==
Historical population
Census	Pop.	Note	%±
2000	4,279		—
2010	10,907		154.9%
2020	11,924		9.3%
U.S. Decennial Census

=== 2020 census ===
As of the 2020 census, Trinity had a population of 11,924. The median age was 47.9 years. 21.8% of residents were under the age of 18 and 25.5% of residents were 65 years of age or older. For every 100 females there were 91.4 males, and for every 100 females age 18 and over there were 90.8 males age 18 and over.

100.0% of residents lived in urban areas, while 0.0% lived in rural areas.

There were 4,478 households in Trinity, of which 32.6% had children under the age of 18 living in them. Of all households, 69.9% were married-couple households, 9.3% were households with a male householder and no spouse or partner present, and 16.0% were households with a female householder and no spouse or partner present. About 14.8% of all households were made up of individuals and 9.7% had someone living alone who was 65 years of age or older.

There were 4,681 housing units, of which 4.3% were vacant. The homeowner vacancy rate was 1.2% and the rental vacancy rate was 8.6%.

Racial composition as of the 2020 census
Race	Number	Percent
White	9,932	83.3%
Black or African American	282	2.4%
American Indian and Alaska Native	24	0.2%
Asian	405	3.4%
Native Hawaiian and Other Pacific Islander	8	0.1%
Some other race	257	2.2%
Two or more races	1,016	8.5%
Hispanic or Latino (of any race)	1,001	8.4%

=== 2000 census ===
As of the census of 2000, there were 4,279 people, 1,683 households, and 1,479 families residing in the CDP. The population density was 906.4 inhabitants per square mile (350.0/km^{2}). There were 1,863 housing units at an average density of 394.6 per square mile (152.4/km^{2}). The racial makeup of the CDP was 96.03% White, 0.68% African American, 1.71% Asian, 0.02% Pacific Islander, 0.42% from other races, and 0.84% from two or more races. Hispanic or Latino of any race were 2.83% of the population.

There were 1,683 households, out of which 27.5% had children under the age of 18 living with them, 82.6% were married couples living together, 4.0% had a female householder with no husband present, and 12.1% were non-families. 9.7% of all households were made up of individuals, and 5.2% had someone living alone who was 65 years of age or older. The average household size was 2.54 and the average family size was 2.71.

In the CDP, the population was spread out, with 20.6% under the age of 18, 2.8% from 18 to 24, 24.1% from 25 to 44, 31.7% from 45 to 64, and 20.8% who were 65 years of age or older. The median age was 47 years. For every 100 females, there were 93.6 males. For every 100 females age 18 and over, there were 92.0 males.

The median income for a household in the CDP was $68,883, and the median income for a family was $72,365. Males had a median income of $57,375 versus $31,384 for females. The per capita income for the CDP was $31,187. About 1.8% of families and 2.1% of the population were below the poverty line, including none of those under age 18 and 1.9% of those age 65 or over.

== Education ==
The public schools serving the Trinity area belong to the Pasco County School District. The serving school district elementary schools include Trinity Elementary School, Trinity Oaks Elementary School, Seven Springs Elementary School, Odessa Elementary School, and Athenian Academy of Technology and the Arts (charter school). Kids also attend Seven Springs Middle School and J.W. Mitchell High School. Trinity private schools include Elfers Christian School, Genesis School, Solid Rock Community School and Genesis Preparatory School. Trinity College of Florida, a 4-year private Christian college, is also located here.

== Airport ==
Trinity once shared a small airport with Odessa, FL. The Tampa Bay Executive Airport, at the corner of Trinity Blvd and SR 54, closed in 2004. Today, residents must use either Tampa International Airport or St. Pete/Clearwater International Airport.
