= Elfers, Florida =

- CDP
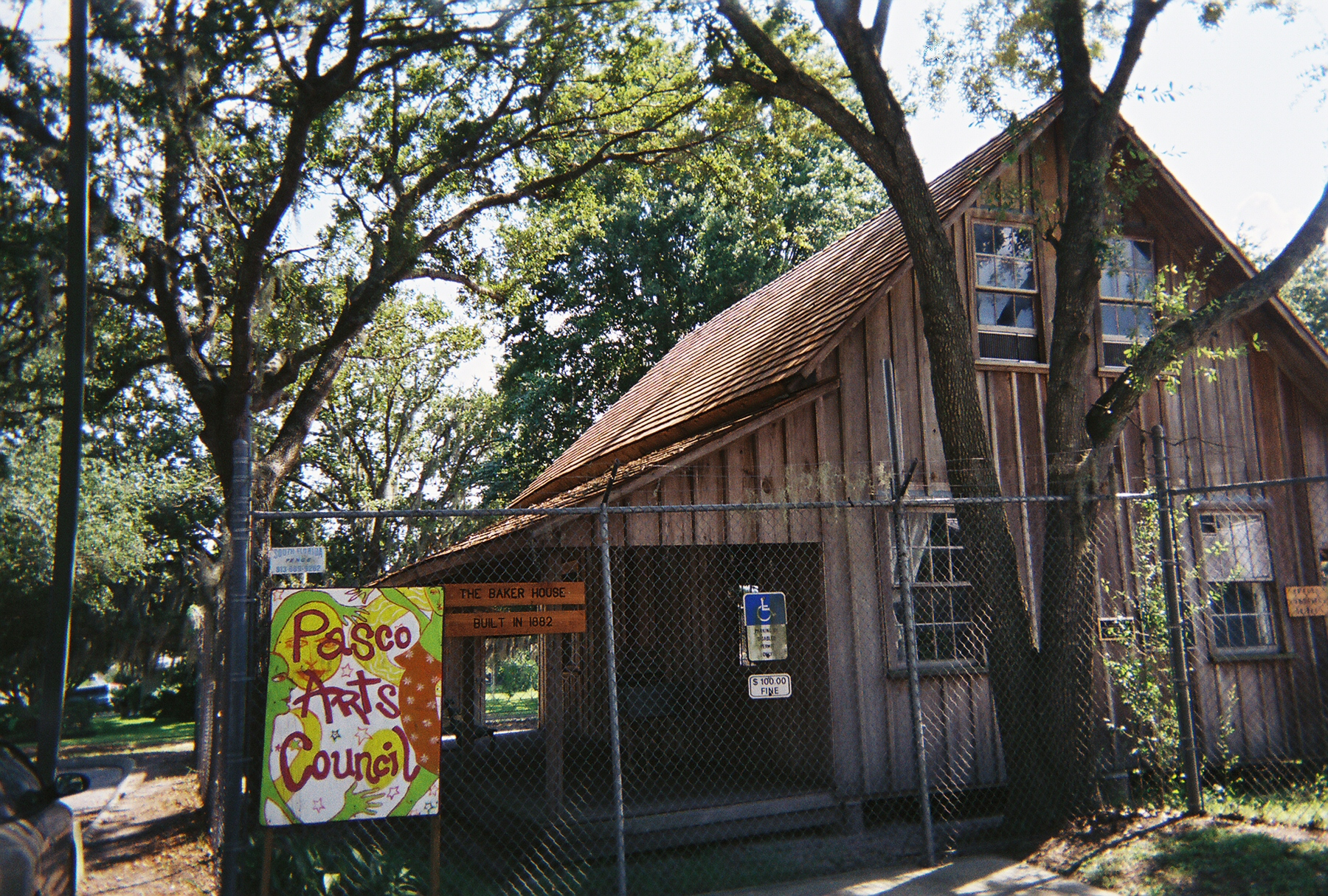
- The historic Samuel Baker House on the NRHP

- Location in Pasco County and the state of Florida
- Coordinates: 28°12′51″N 82°43′19″W
- Country: United States
- State: Florida
- County: Pasco

Area
  - Total: 3.75 sq mi (9.72 km^{2})
  - Land: 3.73 sq mi (9.65 km^{2})
  - Water: 0.023 sq mi (0.06 km^{2})
- Elevation: 33 ft (10 m)

Population (2020)population_density_km2 = 1509.80
  - Total: 14,573
  - Density: 3,910.12/sq mi (1,509.71/km^{2})
- Time zone: UTC-5 (Eastern (EST))
  - Summer (DST): UTC-4 (EDT)
- ZIP code: 34680
- Area code: 727
- FIPS code: 12-20275
- GNIS feature ID: 2402448

Elfers is a census-designated place (CDP) in Pasco County, Florida, United States. As of the 2020 census, Elfers had a population of 14,573.

== Geography ==
According to the United States Census Bureau, the CDP has a total area of 3.5 square miles (9.1 km^{2}), of which 3.5 square miles (9.1 km^{2}) is land and 0.04 square miles (0.10 km^{2}) (0.57%) is water.

== Demographics ==
Historical population
Census	Pop.	Note	%±
2020	14,573		—
U.S. Decennial Census

=== 2020 census ===
As of the 2020 census, Elfers had a population of 14,573. The median age was 42.5 years. 20.2% of residents were under the age of 18 and 19.7% of residents were 65 years of age or older. For every 100 females there were 96.1 males, and for every 100 females age 18 and over there were 93.2 males age 18 and over.

100.0% of residents lived in urban areas, while 0.0% lived in rural areas.

There were 5,927 households in Elfers, of which 27.1% had children under the age of 18 living in them. Of all households, 38.3% were married-couple households, 21.2% were households with a male householder and no spouse or partner present, and 29.4% were households with a female householder and no spouse or partner present. About 28.8% of all households were made up of individuals and 13.9% had someone living alone who was 65 years of age or older.

There were 6,669 housing units, of which 11.1% were vacant. The homeowner vacancy rate was 2.7% and the rental vacancy rate was 8.3%.

Racial composition as of the 2020 census
Race	Number	Percent
White	11,068	75.9%
Black or African American	634	4.4%
American Indian and Alaska Native	61	0.4%
Asian	390	2.7%
Native Hawaiian and Other Pacific Islander	9	0.1%
Some other race	768	5.3%
Two or more races	1,643	11.3%
Hispanic or Latino (of any race)	2,474	17.0%

=== 2000 census ===
As of the census of 2000, there were 13,161 people, 5,701 households, and 3,563 families residing in the CDP. The population density was 3,749.2 inhabitants per square mile (1,447.6/km^{2}). There were 6,482 housing units at an average density of 1,846.5 per square mile (712.9/km^{2}). The racial makeup of the CDP was 95.19% White, 0.96% African American, 0.38% Native American, 0.91% Asian, 0.03% Pacific Islander, 0.93% from other races, and 1.60% from two or more races. Hispanic or Latino of any race were 4.52% of the population.

There were 5,701 households, out of which 23.3% had children under the age of 18 living with them, 47.6% were married couples living together, 11.1% had a female householder with no husband present, and 37.5% were non-families. 31.4% of all households were made up of individuals, and 20.0% had someone living alone who was 65 years of age or older. The average household size was 2.23 and the average family size was 2.77.

In the CDP, the population was spread out, with 20.1% under the age of 18, 5.4% from 18 to 24, 24.5% from 25 to 44, 19.3% from 45 to 64, and 30.7% who were 65 years of age or older. The median age was 45 years. For every 100 females, there were 82.7 males. For every 100 females age 18 and over, there were 79.4 males.

The median income for a household in the CDP was $28,998, and the median income for a family was $31,735. Males had a median income of $27,536 versus $21,595 for females. The per capita income for the CDP was $15,801. About 10.6% of families and 12.9% of the population were below the poverty line, including 17.1% of those under age 18 and 10.8% of those age 65 or over.

== History ==
The area was known as the Baillie settlement until the Elfers post office was established on Dec. 14, 1909. Frieda Marie (Bolling) Eiland, the wife of the first postmaster, chose the name of the post office to honor a favorite uncle, whose last name was Elfers. Railroad service came to Elfers for the shipment of citrus in 1913. In 1915, the Elfers School opened; it was the first brick school in western Pasco County. A new building replaced it in 1966. The Elfers School red brick school has been converted into the Elfers CARES Center which celebrated a grand re-opening in 2013. The building now has a cafe, a "spacious auditorium", and is the home of the Avery Branch of the New Port Richey Public Library. Elfers was incorporated from 1925 to 1933.
