= List of projects funded by Penny for Pasco =

Penny for Pasco is a 1% sales tax that funds many projects in Pasco County, Florida partially and fully:

== Industrial and office ==
- 54 Crossings
- Asturia Corporate Center
- Gary Plastic Packaging Warehouse
- Moffitt Cancer Center
- North Tampa Bay 75 Business Center
- Sunlake Business Center

== Infrastructure ==
- Grand Boulevard (renovation)

== Recreation ==
- Anclote Coastal Trail
- Meadows Park (renovation)
- Orange Belt Trail
- Zephyrhills Library

== Preservation ==
- Crossbar Ecological Corridor (expansion)
- Upper Pithlachascotee River Preserve (expansion)

== Public safety ==
- Pasco County Fire Station 13

== Schools ==
- Angeline Athletic Complex
- Quail Hollow Elementary School (renovation)
- Shady Hills Elementary School (renovation)
- Woodland Elementary School (renovation)
