= Aripeka Sandhills Preserve =

- Location within Florida
- Location: Pasco County, Florida
- Nearest city: Aripeka
- Coordinates: 28.42°N 82.6565°W
- Area: 210 acres (85 ha)
- Established: November 8, 2007; 18 years ago
- Governing body: Southwest Florida Water Management District
- Website: www.pascocountyfl.net/index.aspx?NID=658

Aripeka Sandhills Preserve is a protected area of 210 acres (85 ha) west of US 19 near Aripeka, Florida and Hudson, Florida. It preserves hardwood swamps and pine sandhill. The preserve is managed by the Southwest Florida Water Management District (SWFWMD).

The park entrance is located at 18000 Aripeka Road, Hudson, Florida. There are 1.6 miles of trails in the park, with off-road biking and fishing both permitted. The park has as over 200 species of bird that have been spotted at the park.

== History ==
The preserve was originally bought on November 8, 2007, as a joint effort of the SWFWMD and Pasco County, funded by the Penny for Pasco program.
