= Anclote Key Preserve State Park =

State park in Florida, United States

- IUCN category IV (habitat/species management area)
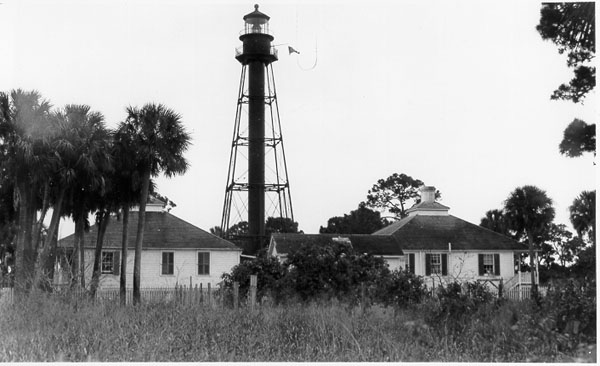
- Anclote Keys Light

- Location within Florida Location within the United States
- Interactive map of Anclote Key Preserve State Park
- Location: Pasco County, Florida, USA
- Nearest city: Tarpon Springs, Florida
- Coordinates: 28°11′35″N 82°51′04″W
- Governing body: Florida Department of Environmental Protection

Anclote Key Preserve State Park is a Florida State Park and historic site, located on Anclote Key three miles (5 km) off Tarpon Springs along the Atlantic coastal plain. Anclote Key Preserve State Park is only accessible by boat.

== Amenities ==
Amenities include primitive camping on the northern portion of the island as well as picnic pavilions and grills. Wildlife includes the American oystercatcher, bald eagle and piping plover. The park is unique in that a lighthouse, built in 1887, is on the southern end of the key in Pinellas County, Florida. Three Rooker Island, south of Anclote and part of the preserve, remains an important Gulf Coast beach-nesting bird sanctuary.

== Recreational activities ==
The park has such amenities as beaches, birding, primitive camping, boating, fishing, hiking, picknicking areas and wildlife viewing.
