= Starkey Ranch Theatre Library Cultural Center =

Library and cultural center in Pasco County, Florida

- Interactive map of the Starkey Ranch Theatre Library Cultural Center area

General information
- Status: Completed
- Type: Cultural center; library; theater
- Location: 12118 Lake Blanche Dr. Odessa, Pasco County, Florida, United States
- Coordinates: 28°12′06″N 82°36′57″W
- Completed: August 2021
- Cost: US$2,100,000
- Client: Pasco County Schools; Pasco County Libraries

Technical details
- Size: 26,000 square feet (2,400 m^{2})

Design and construction
- Architect: Fleischman Garcia Maslowski Architecture

Other information
- Seating capacity: 250 (in theater)

Website
- www.pascolibraries.org/about/locations-and-hours/starkey-ranch-theatre-library-cultural-center/

Starkey Ranch Theatre Library Cultural Center is a cultural center in Starkey Ranch, Pasco County, Florida, used as a library and theater. It is facilitated by Pasco County Libraries, Pasco County Schools, and the Starkey community.

It is known as "the community's living room". The center was completed in 2021 by Fleischman Garcia Maslowski Architecture costing over US$2,000,000 to build.

== Creation ==
=== Construction ===
Starkey Ranch Theatre Library Cultural Center creation was completed in August 2021, by Pasco County Libraries, the Pasco County Schools, Pasco County Parks and Recreation, and the Starkey Ranch developer, costing more than US$2,100,000 to build.

=== Architecture ===
It was built by Fleischman Garcia Maslowski Architecture. The building's architecture was featured in Library Journal's "Year in Architecture 2021" issue. It was recognized by the magazine for incorporating nature in its design, like soft, natural light in the lobby and natural wood in the main building parts.

== Characteristics ==
Overall, Starkey Ranch Theatre Library Cultural Center is 26,000 square feet (2,400 m^{2}) in size. It is located at 12118 Lake Blanche Dr. in Odessa, Pasco County, Florida.

Starkey Ranch Theatre Library Cultural Center has a theater with a capacity of 250 seats. It is used for performances, talks, graduations, and other events. Starkey Ranch Theatre Library Cultural Center includes a library with more than 97,649 book volumes in its collection, circulating over 328,610 transactions a year.

== Usage ==
Starkey Ranch Theatre Library Cultural Center has over 16,000 total visitors per month. The center is mostly used by Pasco County Libraries, Pasco County Schools, the Starkey Ranch K–8 School, and the Starkey Ranch community. The facility is dubbed as "the community's living room".

The Starkey Ranch K–8 School uses Starkey Ranch Theatre Library Cultural Center as its media center, library, and student tutoring area. The children's room is used as the school's media center and the gymnasium is a space for school events.

== See also ==
- Florida Library Association
