= Centennial Park Branch Library =

Public library in Elfers, Pasco County, Florida

Coordinates: 28°12′35.442″N 82°43′9.739″W

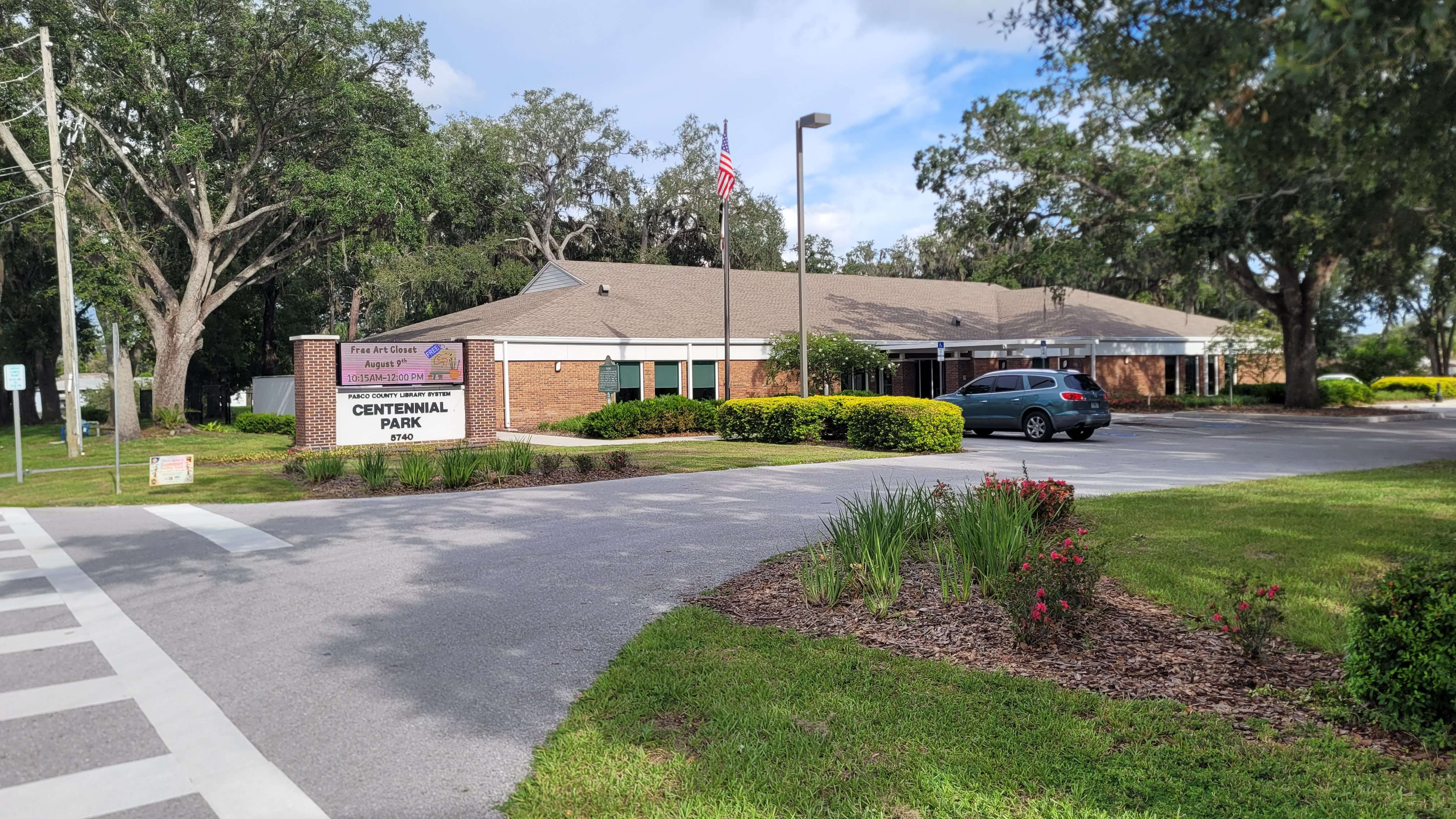
- Front of the Centennial Park Library
- Location: 5740 Moog Rd, Holiday, Florida, United States
- Type: public library
- Established: September 20, 1987; 38 years ago
- Branch of: Pasco County Libraries

Collection
- Size: 57190

Access and use
- Circulation: 206033

Other information
- Website: https://www.pascolibraries.org/about/locations-and-hours/centennial-park-branch-library/

The Centennial Park Branch Library is a public library that servers Holiday and Elfers in Pasco County, Florida. It is a part of Pasco County Libraries. The Library is located at 5740 Moog Rd, Holiday, Florida.

== Services ==
All books in the Pasco County Library Cooperative can be taken and returned at any location. The library has 57,000 volumes, while circulating 206,000 a year.

== History ==
The library opened as a volunteer library in 1978, being named the Holiday Library. It became a part of the Pasco County library Cooperative in 1980. The library opened on September 20, 1987.

The library was closed for remodeling and reopened on May 24, 2021.
