= Starkey Ranch, Florida =

Unincorporated community in Pasco County, Florida, United States

Starkey Ranch
- Unincorporated community
- Location within the state of Florida
- Coordinates: 28°12′11.63″N 82°36′37.89″W
- Country: United States
- State: Florida
- County: Pasco
- Time zone: UTC-5 (Eastern (EST))
  - Summer (DST): UTC-4 (EDT)

Starkey Ranch, commonly referred to as Starkey, is an unincorporated community in Pasco County, Florida. The community is a master-planned community along SR-54 by Wheelock Communities.

== Neighborhoods ==
Starkey Ranch has 9 major neighborhoods:

- Esplanade
- Hutcheson Preserve
- Albritton Park
- Monroe Commons
- Anclote Reserve
- Whitfield Park
- Whitefield Preserve
- Homestead Park
- Stansil Park

== Arts and culture ==
=== Libraries ===
Starkey Ranch Theatre Library Cultural Center is the only library in Starkey. It is on the Starkey Ranch K-8 campus, and is a part of the Pasco County Library Cooperative.

== Parks and recreation ==
=== Parks ===
Starkey Ranch District Park is the biggest park in Starkey Ranch, next to Starkey Ranch K-8. While the park is not fully finished, the park currently offers 5 softball fields, 3 multi-purpose fields, 2 concession stands, 4 pavilions, and a playground.

== History ==
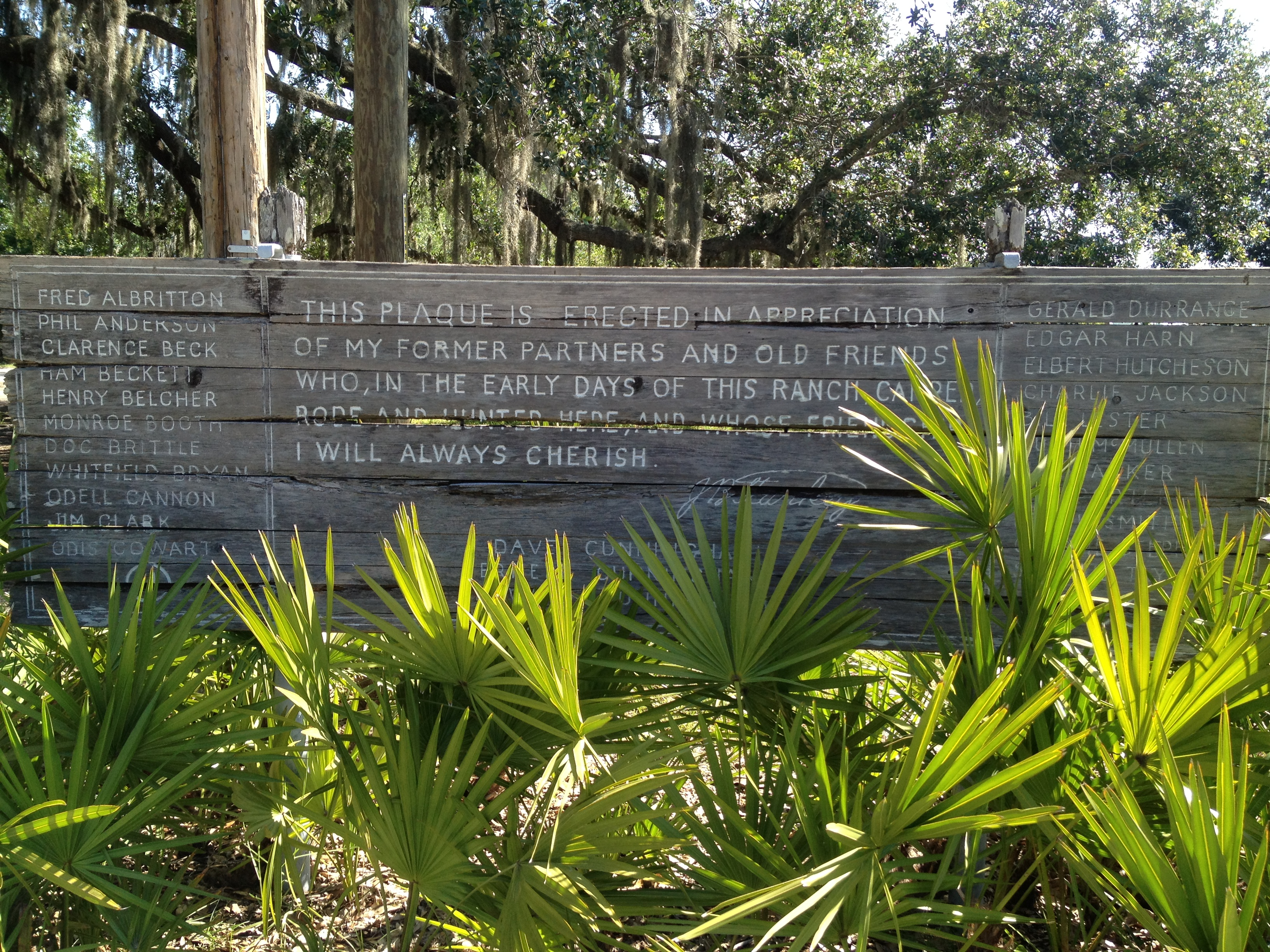
A plaque erected by the Starkey family in Starkey Ranch

In 1922, Jay Starkey bought 10 acres of what is now Starkey Ranch, for a ranch. Over the decades, he expanded his ranch to over 16,000 acres, with a goal to preserve a majority of the ranch. After his death, Jay Starkey Jr. eventually sold the majority of the ranch's land to the Southwest Florida Water Management District (SWFWMD); the land became the Jay B Starkey Wilderness Preserve. In 2013, Wheelock Communities bought the last 2,500 acres of Starkey Ranch to construct a master planned community, preserving some of the land for green space and miles of trails.

== Education ==
The public school system for Starkey Ranch is Pasco County Schools.

As of May 2025, Starkey Ranch K-8 is the only school in the community and serves as the communities elementary school and middle school. While not in the community, River Ridge High School serves as their zoned high school. Creative World is one of the communities Pre-K school, though not a part of Pasco County Schools.

The STEAM / STEM Magnet Program Pathways for Starkey Ranch are James M. Marlowe Elementary, Bayonet Point Middle, and Wendell Krinn Technical High School.
