= Upper Pithlachascotee River Preserve =

129-acre area of protected land in Pasco County, Florida

Coordinates: 28.3419°N 82.5335°W

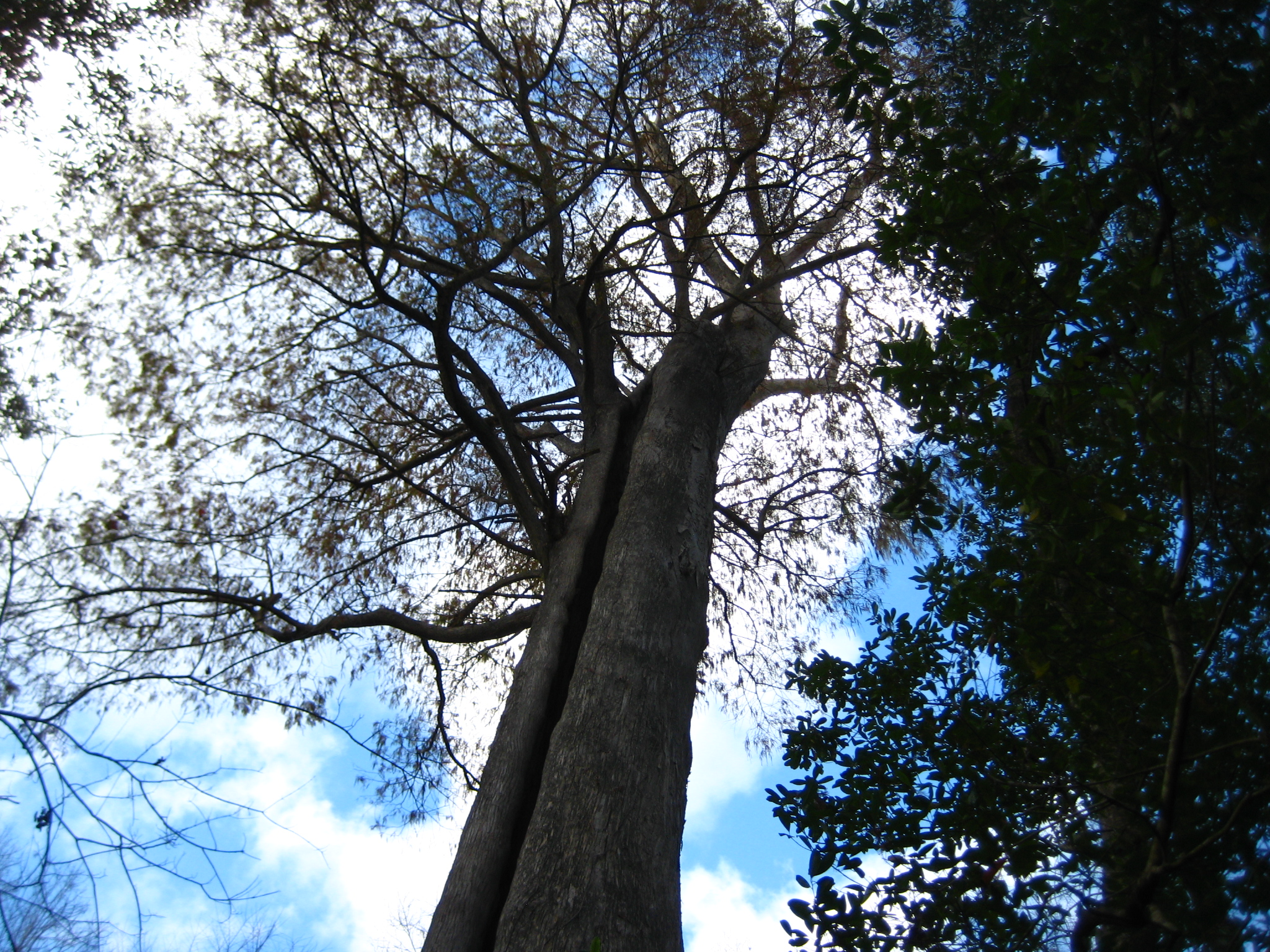

Upper Pithlachascotee River Preserve, also referred to as Upper Cotee Preserve, is a 129-acre area of protected land in Pasco County, Florida. It includes 69 acres of bottomland forest by the Pithlachascotee River and the Ryals Branch, a tributary that crosses the site. The park includes a Cypress tree believed to be between 200 and 300 years old, a specimen listed in the Historic Places of Pasco County. It was the first property purchased through the Pasco County's ELAMP program with funding from the "Penny for Pasco" sales tax. It includes sandhill habitat, upland mixed forest and freshwater marshes. The Upper Cotee Preserve is located at 17135 Minneola Drive and includes a nature center, boardwalk and hiking trail. The area provides habitat for deer, wild turkey, gopher tortoises, barred owl, red-shouldered hawks, the Florida mouse, gopher frog, little blue heron and snowy egret.

== Trail map ==
- Trail map and location map
