= Senator Hope =

Senator Hope may refer to:

- Alexander W. Hope (died 1856), California State Senate
- Leighton A. Hope (1921–1998), New York State Senate
- Sam Hope (politician) (1833–1919), Florida State Senate
