= Regency Park Branch Library =

Public library in New Port Richey, Pasco County, Florida

Coordinates: 28°17′54″N 82°40′22″W

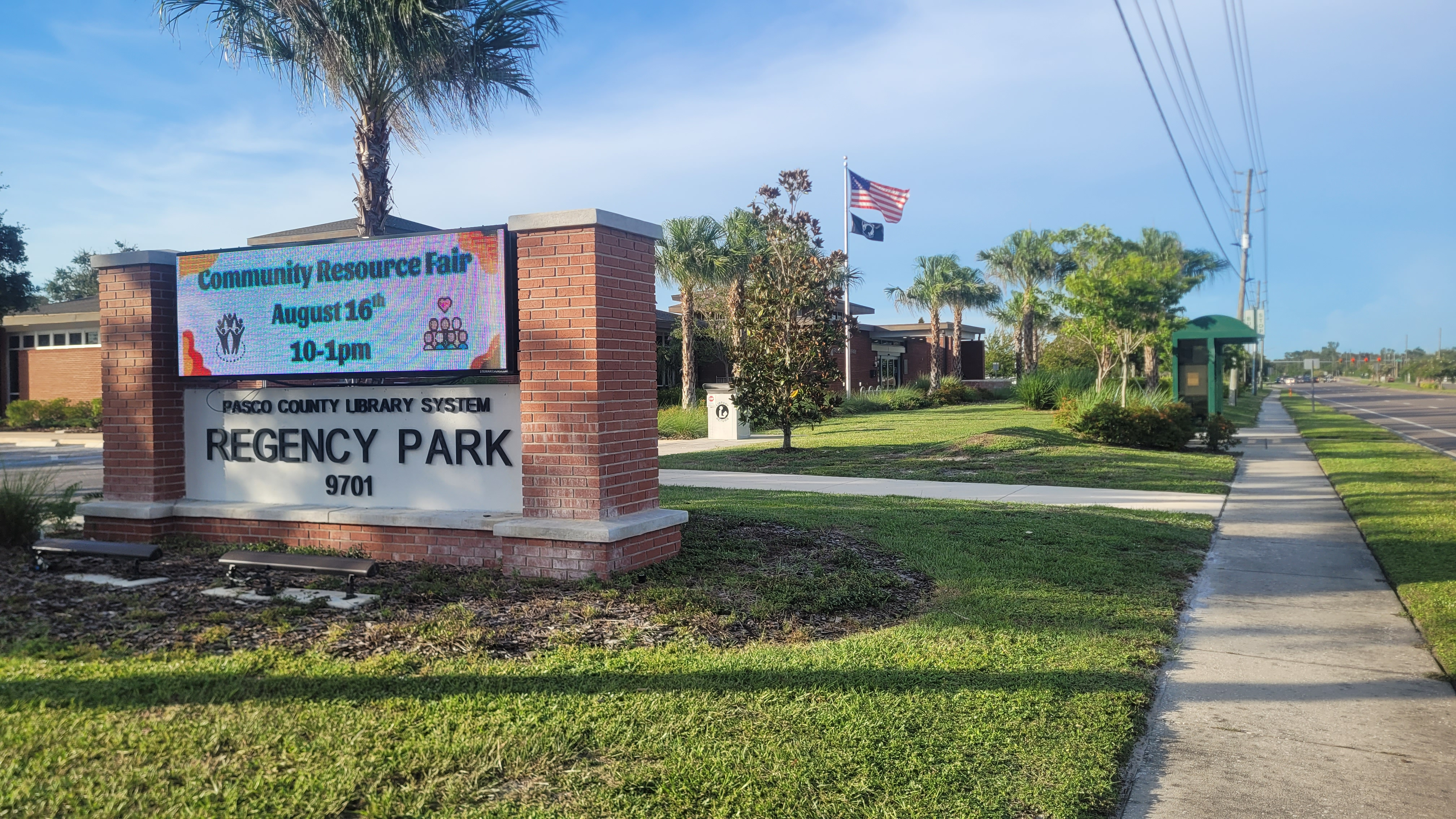
- Location: 9701 Little Rd, New Port Richey, Florida, United States
- Type: public library
- Established: October 26, 1990; 35 years ago
- Branch of: Pasco County Libraries

Collection
- Size: 88,215

Access and use
- Circulation: 333,048

Other information
- Website: https://pascolibraries.org/about/locations-and-hours/regency-park-branch-library/

The Regency Park Branch Library is a public library that serves residents of Port Richey and New Port Richey in Pasco County, Florida. It is a part of Pasco County Libraries. The library is located at 9701 Little Rd, New Port Richey, Florida.

== Services ==
Regency Park Branch Library often hosts classes for residents to come and learn such as a balloon twisting class.

=== Makerspace ===
Regency Park Branch Library has a makerspace, called Regency Fresh, and includes a kitchen that includes spaces for cooking and dining. Additionally, the library is setting up a garden with fruits and vegetables for cooking. Classes are held to learn to use the tools in the kitchen, nutrition, meal planning, and to cook.

== History ==
The idea of a library in the Regency Park area was first introduced in 1986, when the area was developing and Pasco County approved the 1986 Pasco County Bond Referendum. The contract to start construction of the Regency Park Branch Library was signed in October of 1988, and was expected to cost $797,000.

Construction started on November 2, 1988, and was expected to open July 1989, but was delayed. Regency Park Branch Library was first constructed in 1990, the second library funded by the 1986 Pasco County Bond Referendum. The library was constructed by Z-United Constructors and Enterprise Building Corp. The price was pushed from $797,000 to $1.04 million. The library opened on October 26, 1990, at 10,000 square feet, and cost $1.7 million to construct.

In August of 2005, the Regency Park Branch Library closed for renovations. The renovation was planned to include expanding the library from 10,000 to 18,000 square feet. Due to budget overruns, the construction of the library was delayed until January 2006. The library reopened on March 26, 2007. The renovation included a children's area, a teen room, a computer lab, drive through, and study rooms. The theme of the library was Aquatic, with the walls and floor being tones of blue.

On October 17, 2019, the Regency Park Branch Library opened its makerspace called Regency Fresh.

In October 2023, the Regency Park Library underwent renovations, including an upgrade of the library's makerspace. The renovations were completed on March 25, 2024. Other food-related topics will have classes, such as nutrition.
