= New River Branch Library =

Public library in Wesley Chapel, Pasco County, Florida

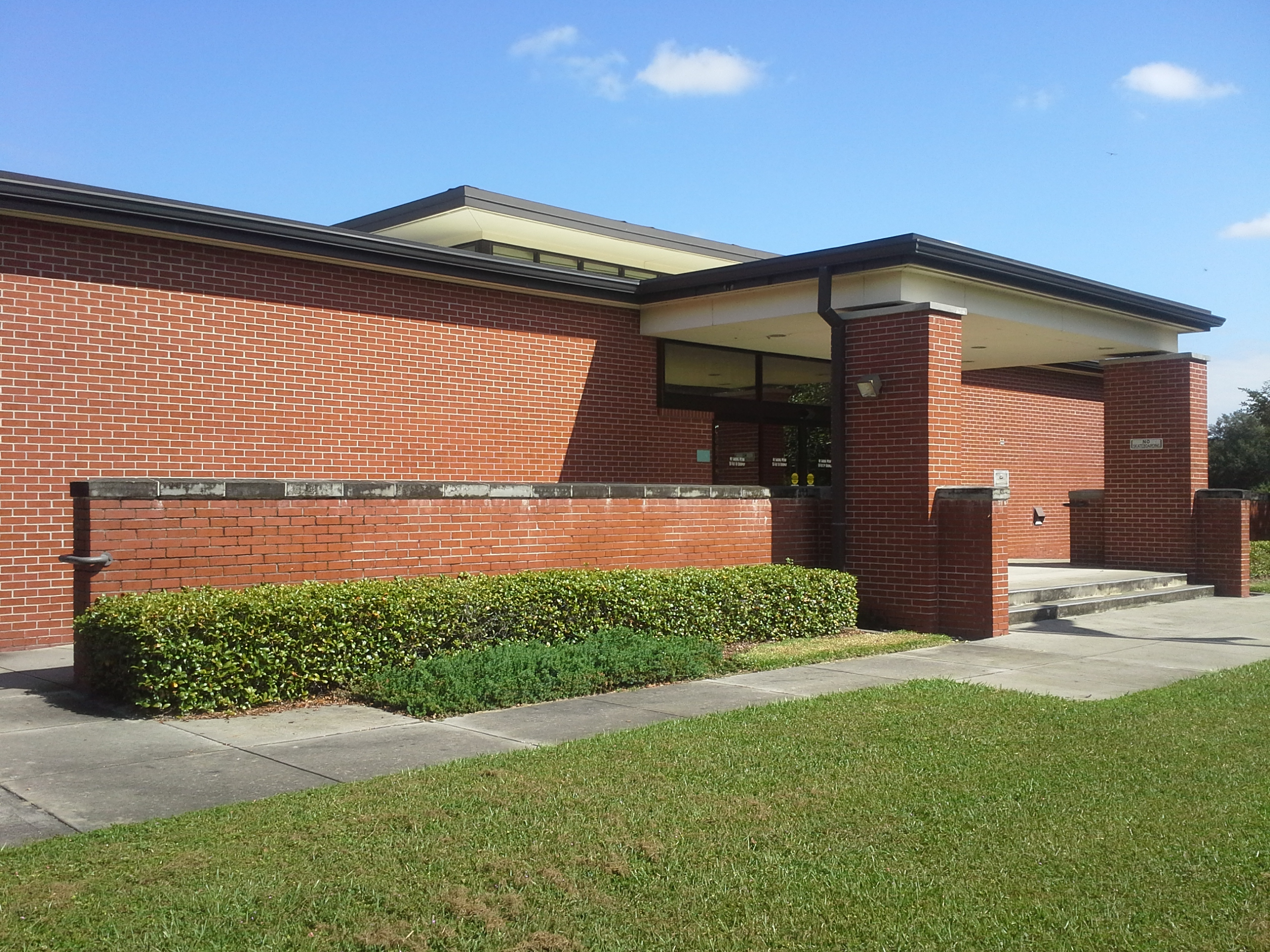
- Front of the New River Branch Library
- Location: 34043 State Road 54, Wesley Chapel, Florida, United States
- Type: Public library
- Established: October 31, 1991; 34 years ago
- Branch of: Pasco County Libraries

Collection
- Size: 72,720 volumes

Access and use
- Circulation: 266,548

Other information
- Website: www.pascolibraries.org/about-us/locations-and-hours/new-river-branch-library/

The New River Branch Library is a public library that serves Wesley Chapel in Pasco County, Florida. It is a part of Pasco County Libraries. The library is located at 34043 FL-54, Wesley Chapel, Florida.

== Services ==
All books in the Pasco County Library Cooperative can be taken and returned at any location. The library has 72,000 volumes, while circulating 266,000 a year. Additionally the library offers a seed library for residents to grow food and plants.

== History ==
New River Branch Library opened on October 31, 1991, paid for with Community Development Block Grant funds (CDBG).

In October of 2019, the New River Branch Library closed for renovations. The total cost of the project was $2.8 million. It included a drive-through book drop-off, a community garden, new restrooms, renovated teen and children rooms, and new air-conditioning. The library reopened on April 30, 2021, with some renovations not complete.

On April 21, 2022, the New River Branch Library held an official rededication, which included a ribbon cutting.
