= Samuel Hope =

Samuel or Sam Hope may refer to:

- Sam Hope (baseball)
- Sam Hope (politician)
- Samuel Hope esq. of Everton, Liverpool, grandfather of Samuel Morley, 1st Baron Hollenden
