= Samuel E. Hope =

American politician (1833–1919)

Samuel Edward Hope (c. 1833–1919) was a Democratic Party member of the Florida State Legislature in 1867 and a Confederate officer during the American Civil War. He saw action against African-American "guerillas" during the war. Hope represented Hernando County in the legislature.

Hope fought against Native Americans in Florida and worked as a surveyor. He also bid on mail carrying routes.

He began his military career as a quartermaster for Florida troops organized by General Jessie Carter, and attained the rank of captain, and later "organized a company of Florida soldiers at the outbreak of the Civil War". Around that time, Hope and his business partner W. W. Wall also advanced goods and funds to men holding state-issued certificates in connection with the Indian Wars, expecting prompt repayment after the war, although that would not end up being the case. Near the end of the war, Hope "was badly wounded at the battle of Reams Station in Virginia".

He was an early resident of Tarpon Springs and advocated for construction of the Anclote Keys Light on Anclote Key.

From 1903 to 1913, Hope continued to press claims with the state legislature that he and others were owed compensation for funds advanced during the Seminole Indian wars. At the age of eighty, Hope said:

The same crowd that fought the payment of the honest Walles claim have fought and are continuing to fight these honest claims... and will doubtless be able to thwart justice again this year. Some day, however, Floridians will get so thoroughly aroused at these people that they will force the payment of every claim contended for.

In 1915, at the age of 82, Hope was praised for actively campaigning in favor of a bond issue for road improvements in Pinellas County, Florida. The state finally paid the bulk of Hope's claims for his advances made in 1861 in 1919—the year that Hope died.
