= Angeline, Florida =

Planned community in Pasco County, Florida, US

Angeline
Project
- Construction started: 2017
- Developer: Metro Development Group; Lennar; DR Horton; Dream Finders Homes
- Website: metrodevelopmentgroup.com/angeline/

Location
- Master-planned community
- Interactive map of Angeline, Florida
- Coordinates: 28.309111°N 82.53125°W
- Country: United States
- State: Florida
- County: Pasco

Area
  - Total: 6,200 acres (2,500 ha)

Angeline is an unincorporated area and master-planned community in Pasco County, Florida. The community is expected to have a population around 35,000 when finished. The name of the community came from the division of the land owned by the Bexley family, Angeline Corporation, and one of the family's ancestors, Ruth Angeline Phillips Bexley.

The community sits east of Suncoast Parkway and south of Florida State Road 52. The community is 6,200 acres, 3,600 of which is planned as green space and 775 acres for Moffitt.

== History ==
Development started when Lennar formed Len-Angeline in 2017 to acquire 2,900 acres of land.

In 2018 Metro Development Group acquired a majority of the land at Angeline and started construction.

In summer of 2023, Pasco County Schools finished construction of Angeline Academy of Innovation, a seven-year, 6-12 magnet school.

On January 24, 2025, Mika Fasano, the tax collector of Pasco County, announced a new tax collector's office in Angeline, making it the sixth in Pasco County.

== Neighborhoods ==
Angeline currently has 9 neighborhoods, but has plans for more. The community is developed by 3 developers, Lennar, DR Horton, and Dream Finders Homes:

=== Lennar ===
- Lennar Active Adult (55+)
- Oak Glade
- Sawgrass Rudge
- Sylvan Hollow
- Woodland Trail

=== DR Horton ===
- Sage Park
- Shaded Glen
- Stonebridge Cove

=== Dream Finders Homes ===
- Canopy Oaks

== Education ==
=== Angeline Country Day ===
Angeline Country Day is a private school on the north side of Angeline, off of FL SR-54. The school opened on August 11, 2025, and offers grades K-5.

=== Angeline Academy of Innovation ===
Angeline Academy of Innovation is a public, STEM magnet school on the south side of Angeline, off of Ridge Road. The school opened August 10, 2023, and offers grades 6-12.

== Speros, Florida ==
In Angeline, Moffitt Cancer Center is building a 775-acre campus called Speros, Florida. The center opened its outpatient center on January 26, 2026, planned to open its proton therapy center in June of 2026 and its discovery and innovation center in October of 2026. Speros is expected to bring 2,400 direct and 8,600 indirect new jobs by 2033, and will contain 140 buildings and 16 million square feet of space for labs, offices, manufacturing, and clinical space.
