= Penny for Pasco =

Voter-approved sales tax program by Pasco County, Florida

Penny for Pasco is a voter-approved sales tax program by Pasco County, Florida, that charges a 1% tax on all goods in Pasco County up to $5,000. The total revenue for the program is estimated to be $1.9 billion.

== History ==
The Penny for Pasco program was first introduced in 1995, though it was rejected by voters. After several years of attempts, the Penny for Pasco Program passed on March 9, 2004, and went in to effect from January 1, 2005, through December 31, 2014. The vote was 52 percent in favor, and 48 percent against the tax.

On November 6, 2012, Penny for Pasco was voted again and extended the sales tax for another 10 years, extending the program until December 31, 2024. The vote was 70 percent in favor, and 30 percent against the tax.

On November 8, 2022, Penny for Pasco was voted again, extending the program for 15 additional years, until December 31, 2039. The vote was 65 percent in favor, and 35 percent against the tax.

== Funding ==
The Penny for Pasco program funds several types of projects such as trails, parks, industry, office, infrastructure, and programs such as the Ready Sites Program, which funds industrial development.

=== Allocation ===
The proceeds are split between the Pasco County Government and Pasco County Schools, which each receives 45% respectively, though Pasco County Government is split into separate services, and 10% gets split between cities:

Penny for Pasco revenue allocation
Service / Munincipality	Share
Pasco County Schools	45%
Transportation	18%
Economic Incentives	9%
Environmental Lands	9%
Public Safety	9%
Zephyrhills	3.59%
New Port Richey	3.49%
Dade City	1.52%
Port Richey	0.64%
St. Leo	0.49%
San Antonio	0.27%
Total	100%

== See also ==
- List of projects funded by Penny for Pasco
