= Three Rooker Island =

Barrier island in Pinellas County, Florida

- Location in Florida Location in United States

Geography
- Location: Gulf of Mexico
- Coordinates: 28°06′30.5″N 82°50′07.2″W

Administration
- United States
- State: Florida
- County: Pinellas

Three Rooker Island, (also known as Three Rooker Bar) is an island in Pinellas County, Florida. The island is west of Tarpon Springs, south of Anclote Key and north of Honeymoon Island. It is accessible only by boat and its shape and size often change from interaction with ocean currents.

Compared to neighboring barrier islands, Three Rooker Island is newly formed and emerged in the 1980s as water currents built up the sand bar above sea level. By the 1990s it was large enough for vegetation to establish itself on the newly formed island further stabilizing it and making it more resistant to washing away. Three Rooker Island is part of the Anclote Key Preserve State Park and is partially protected for nesting seabirds while also allowing it to be a popular place for local boaters.

The area around where Three Rooker Island appeared had little sand available for deposition on shoals and barriers in the middle of the 20th century. There was sand on the Gulf bottom, but it was anchored by beds of seagrass that extended almost up to the surf zone. In, or shortly after, 1960, the sea grass disappeared, and the bottom sand became available for transportation by wave and current action, providing material for the island.

== Sources ==
Davis, Richard A. Jr. (2016). Barrier Islands of the Florida Gulf Coast Peninsula. Sarasota, Florida: Pineapple Press. ISBN 978-1-56164-8085.
