= Anclote Key =

Barrier island in Pasco County, Florida

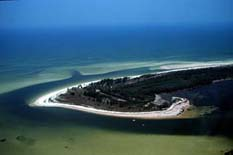
- Anclote Key from the air

- Location in Florida Location in United States

Geography
- Location: Gulf of Mexico
- Coordinates: 28°11′16″N 82°50′44″W

Administration
- United States
- State: Florida
- County: Pasco and Pinellas

Anclote Key is a barrier island off the Gulf Coast of the U.S. state of Florida, the largest island in the Anclote Keys, located at 28°11′16″N 82°50′44″W near Tarpon Springs. Its name originates from the Spanish term for "anchor." The island is accessible only by boat and is split between Anclote Key Preserve State Park and Anclote National Wildlife Reserve. North Anclote Bar, South Anclote Bar, and Three Rooker Island (south of Anclote Key) are part of Anclote Key Preserve State Park. The island contains mangrove wetlands, coastal pine flatwoods, and beaches. A large number of shorebirds nest and breed on Anclote Key and the surrounding islands. Sand Key is located nearby. Most of the island is located within Pasco County, while its southernmost section is in Pinellas County. The island is home to the Anclote Keys Light.

Anclote Key is the northernmost barrier island on the Gulf coast of the Florida peninsula. (Note: The 350 kilometres (220 mi) long Big Bend Coast, stretching north from Anclote Key to the mouth of the Ocklockonee River in the Florida Panhandle, does not have any barrier islands.) It is a wave-dominated barrier island, 3 miles (4.8 km) long, with tidal channels at each end. A mangrove forest extends along the landward side of the island. Radiocarbon dating indicates that the island has existed for about 1,200 to 1,500 years. Sand dunes up to 10 feet (3.0 m) tall occur on the island. Anclote Key has lengthened considerably since 1960, especially on the northern end. This growth has blocked the channel at the north end of the island.

In the 1990s sand bars developed off both the north and south ends of the island, blocking the shallow tidal channels there. Both shoals grew and emerged above water. The new islands are now vegetated, and are known as North Anclote Bar and South Anclote Bar, respectively. The area around Anclote Key had little sand available for deposition on shoals and barriers in the middle of the 20th century. There was sand on the Gulf bottom, but it was anchored by beds of seagrass that extended almost up to the surf zone. In, or shortly after, 1960, the sea grass disappeared, and the bottom sand became available for transportation by wave and current action, providing material for those islands.

== Sources ==
- Davis, Richard A. Jr. (2016). Barrier Islands of the Florida Gulf Coast Peninsula. Sarasota, Florida: Pineapple Press. ISBN 978-1-56164-8085.
