= Aripeka, Florida =

- Census-designated place (CDP) & Unincorporated Community
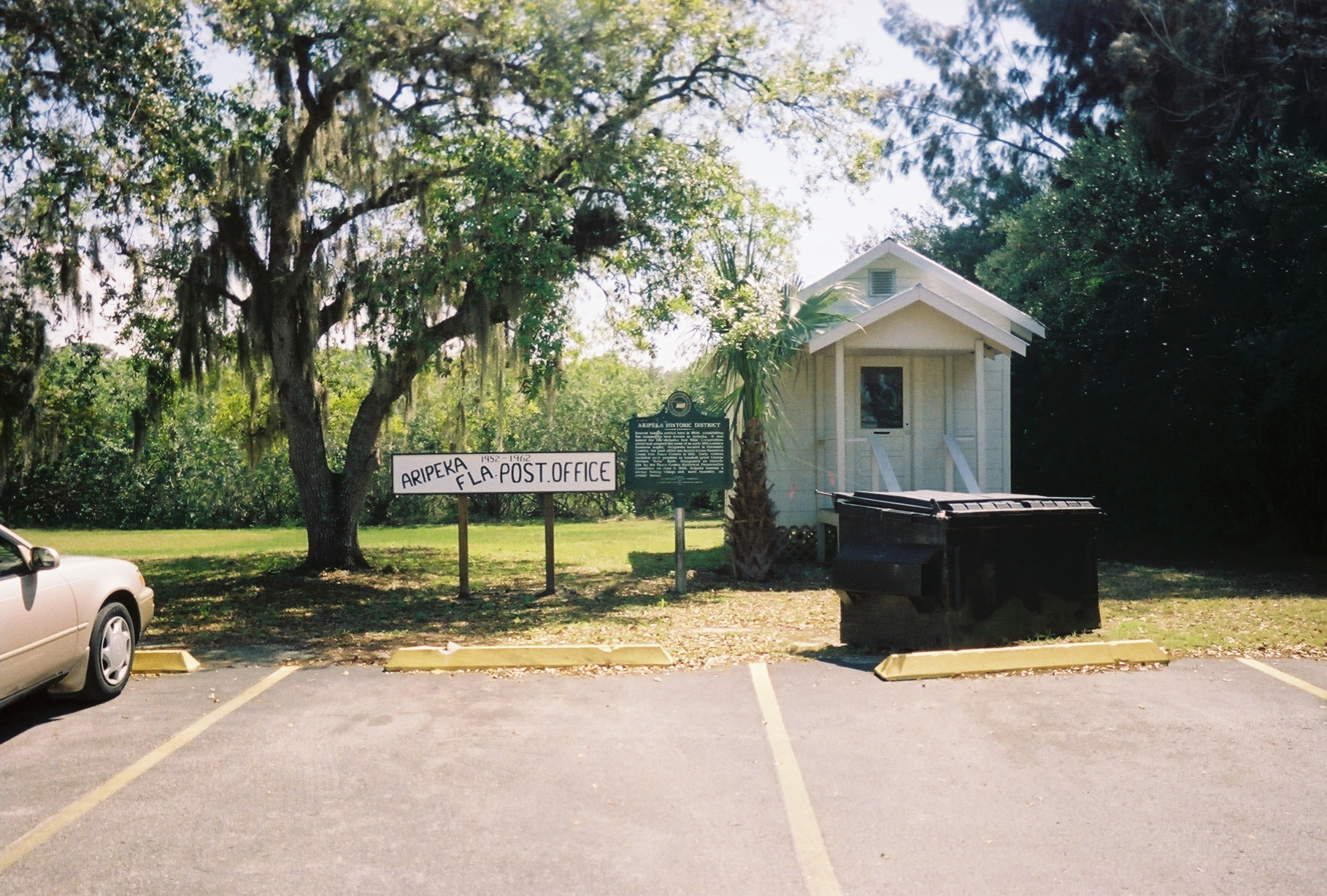
- The historic former Aripeka Post Office on the Pasco County side of the town

- Location of Aripeka in Hernando County and Pasco County, Florida.
- Coordinates: 28°25′51″N 82°40′00″W
- Country: United States
- State: Florida
- Counties: Pasco, Hernando

Area
  - Total: 1.02 sq mi (2.64 km^{2})
  - Land: 0.82 sq mi (2.13 km^{2})
  - Water: 0.20 sq mi (0.52 km^{2})
- Elevation: 3 ft (0.91 m)

Population (2020)
  - Total: 320
  - Density: 390/sq mi (150.4/km^{2})
- Time zone: UTC-5 (Eastern (EST))
  - Summer (DST): UTC-4 (EDT)
- ZIP Code: 34679 (originally 33502)
- Area code: 727
- FIPS code: 12-01875
- GNIS feature ID: 2583324

Aripeka is an unincorporated community and census-designated place (CDP) in the U.S. state of Florida, along the coast of the Gulf of Mexico at the border dividing Pasco and Hernando counties. The ZIP Code for the community is 34679, but it was originally assigned as 33502. As of the 2020 census, the population was 320.

== Geography ==
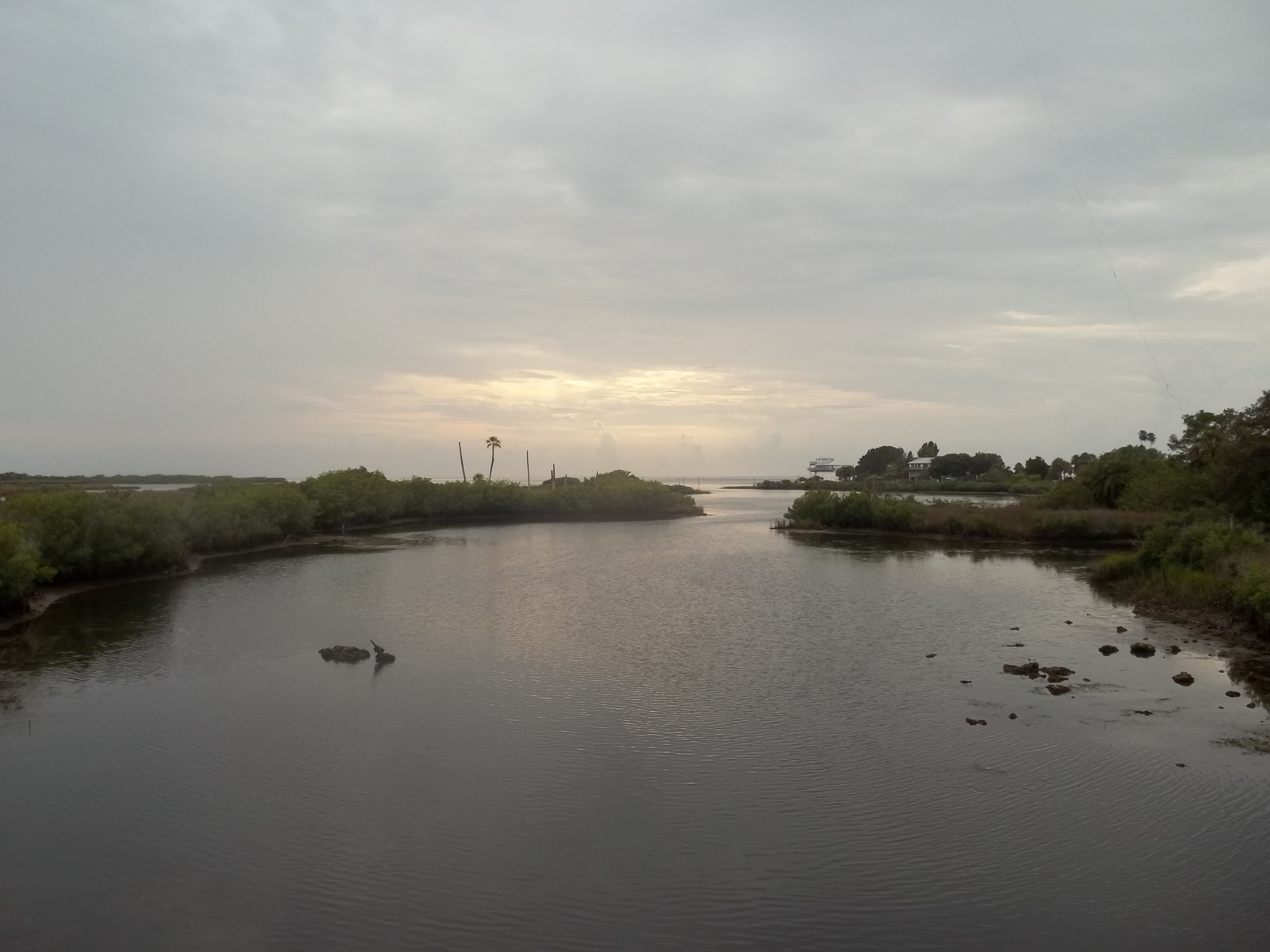
South Hammock Creek, looking west from the bridge

Aripeka is located on both sides of Hammock Creek, a small tidal inlet to the Gulf of Mexico. Similar in geophysical structure to Hernando Beach, Bayport, and Pine Island, Florida, Aripeka is surrounded by marshland, mostly within Hernando County. The Pasco-Hernando county line is located at the South Hammock Creek Bridge.

== History ==
The community of Gulf Key was settled in this area in 1873 and a post office by that name was established in 1883. The post office was known briefly as, "Argo". It was replaced by the Aripeka post office in 1895. Aripeka is named after Seminole Indian chief Abiaka, who is thought to have once lived in the area. The town was divided when Pasco County separated from Hernando County in 1887. The post office, which was originally in Hernando County, moved across the Pasco County line in 1921. According to the historical marker in the town, Babe Ruth visited Aripeka to fish. On June 3, 1993, the Pasco County Historic Preservation Committee dedicated the town a State Historic Site.

== Transportation ==
The main road through Aripeka is County Road 595, named Aripeka Road in Pasco County and Osowaw Boulevard in Hernando County. This road was part of the original Dixie Highway and suffers frequent flooding in the heart of town due to its close proximity to the water. CR 595 leads southeast 1.8 miles (2.9 km) to U.S. Route 19 and northeast 4 miles (6 km), also to US 19.

== Demographics ==
Historical population
Census	Pop.	Note	%±
2010	308		—
2020	320		3.9%
U.S. Decennial Census

Aripeka first appeared as a census designated place in the 2010 U.S. census.

=== Racial and ethnic composition ===
Aripeka CDP, Florida – Racial and ethnic composition Note: the US Census treats Hispanic/Latino as an ethnic category. This table excludes Latinos from the racial categories and assigns them to a separate category. Hispanics/Latinos may be of any race.
Race / Ethnicity (NH = Non-Hispanic)	Pop 2010	Pop 2020	% 2010	% 2020
White alone (NH)	271	283	87.99%	88.44%
Black or African American alone (NH)	1	2	0.32%	0.63%
Native American or Alaska Native alone (NH)	1	0	0.32%	0.00%
Asian alone (NH)	2	0	0.65%	0.00%
Native Hawaiian or Pacific Islander alone (NH)	0	0	0.00%	0.00%
Other race alone (NH)	0	3	0.00%	0.94%
Mixed race or Multiracial (NH)	17	8	5.52%	2.50%
Hispanic or Latino (any race)	16	24	5.19%	7.50%
Total	308	320	100.00%	100.00%

== Notable resident ==
- James Rosenquist, an artist, maintained a home, office and studio space during his later years.
