= Anclote Keys Light =

Lighthouse in Florida, US

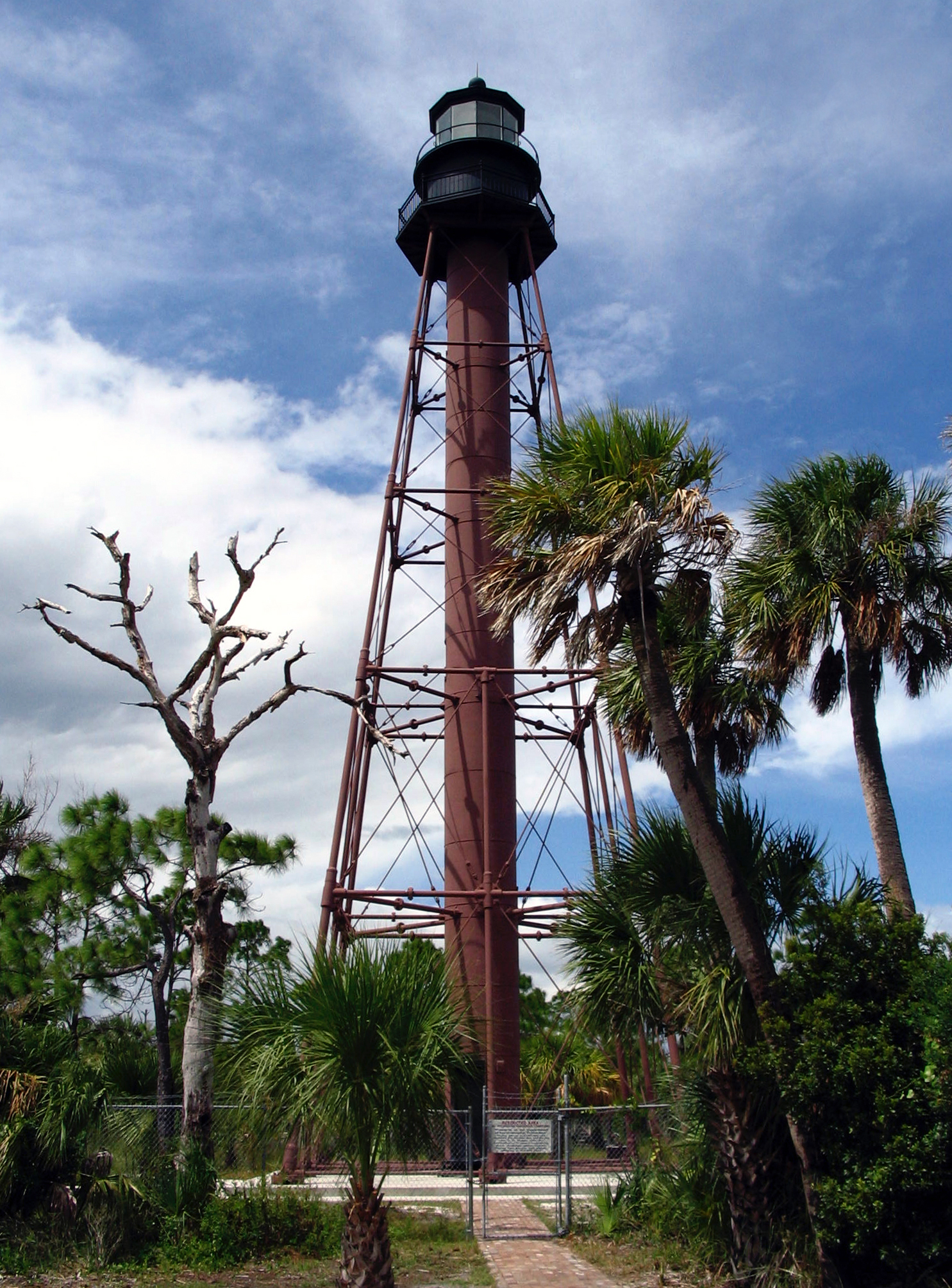
- Anclote Keys lighthouse as it appeared in 2005
- Location: Anclote Key; Tarpon Springs; Florida; United States
- Coordinates: 28°10′1.3″N 82°50′41.0″W

Tower
- Constructed: 1887
- Foundation: piling
- Construction: cast iron skeletal tower
- Automated: 1952
- Height: 102 feet (31 m)
- Shape: skeletal tower with central cylinder, balcony and lantern
- Markings: brown tower, black lantern
- Operator: Anclote Key Preserve State Park
- Heritage: National Register of Historic Places listed place

Light
- First lit: 2003
- Deactivated: 1984-2003
- Focal height: 110 feet (34 m)
- Lens: third-order Fresnel lens (original), replica of fourth-order Fresnel lens (current)
- Range: 19 nautical miles (35 km; 22 mi)
- Characteristic: Fl (4) W 30s.
- Anclote Key Lighthouse
- U.S. National Register of Historic Places
- Area: less than one acre
- Architect: US Lighthouse Service
- Architectural style: cast-iron Skeletal Structure
- NRHP reference No.: 99000410
- Added to NRHP: April 1, 1999

The Anclote Keys Light is a lighthouse built in 1887 on Anclote Key, the largest of the Anclote Keys. It is a skeletal square pyramidal tower, painted brown, with a black lantern. After the lighthouse was automated in 1952 the tower and other buildings at the site were often vandalized, interfering with the operation of the light. The Coast Guard determined that the light was no longer needed and deactivated it in 1984. The site was eventually turned over to the State of Florida and added to Anclote Key Preserve State Park. As of 2003 the lighthouse has been restored and relighted using a reproduction fourth-order Fresnel lens. Anclote Key is accessible only by boat.

It is listed as Anclote Key Light number 1555 in the USCG light lists.

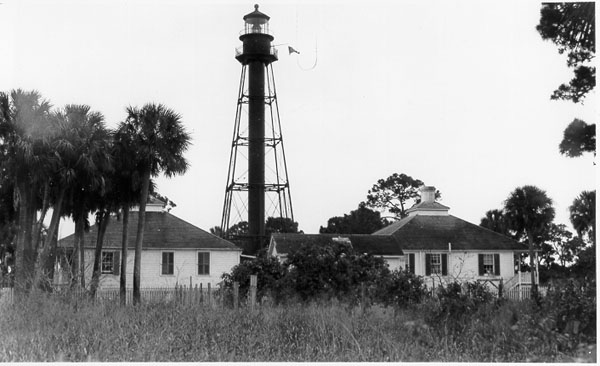
Anclote Keys Lighthouse when it was still manned (by U.S. Coast Guard archives)

== Head keepers ==
- James Gardner (1887 – 1888)
- Samuel E. Hope Jr. (1888 – 1889)
- James M. Baggett (1889 – 1891)
- Robert S. Meyer (1891 – 1914)
- Thomas A. Moody (1914 – 1923)
- Robert S. Meyer (1923 – 1933),
- James L. Pippin (1933 – at least 1949)

== See also ==
- List of lighthouses in Florida
- List of lighthouses in the United States
