= Pasco County, Florida =

County in Florida, United States

- U.S. County
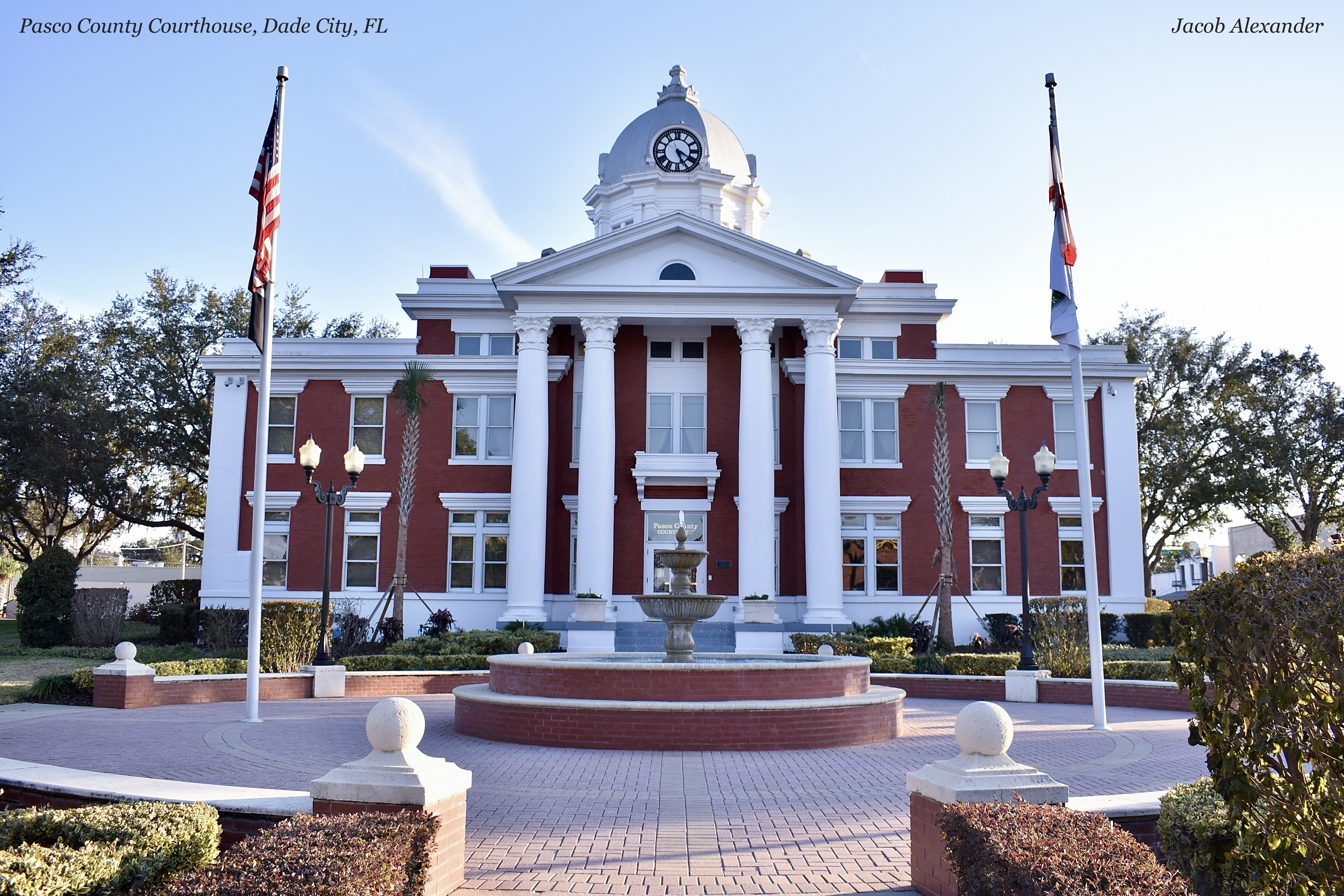
- Pasco County Courthouse, 2026

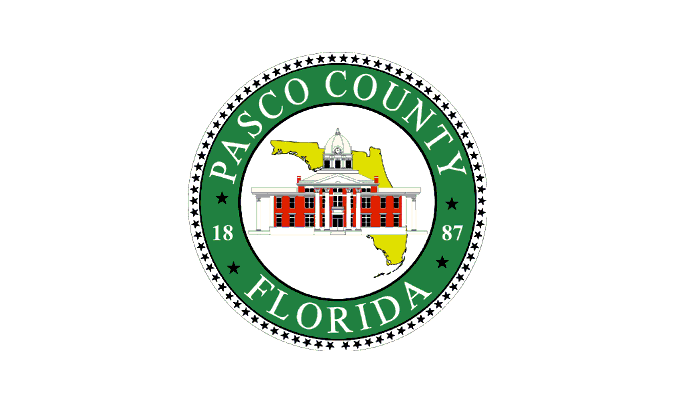
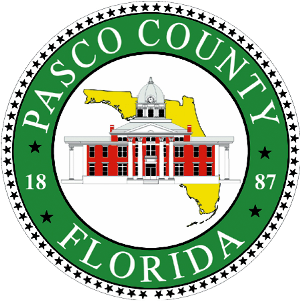
- Flag Seal Logo

- Location within the U.S. state of Florida
- Coordinates: 28°18′N 82°26′W
- Country: United States
- State: Florida
- Founded: June 2, 1887
- Named for: Samuel Pasco
- Seat: Dade City
- Largest CDP: Wesley Chapel

Area
  - Total: 868 sq mi (2,250 km^{2})
  - Land: 747 sq mi (1,930 km^{2})
  - Water: 122 sq mi (320 km^{2}) 14.0%

Population (2020)
  - Total: 561,891
  - Estimate (2025): 674,516 ▲
  - Density: 910/sq mi (352/km^{2})
- Time zone: UTC−5 (Eastern)
  - Summer (DST): UTC−4 (EDT)
- Congressional districts: 12th, 15th
- Website: www.pascocountyfl.gov

Pasco County is a county located on the west central coast in the U.S. state of Florida. As of 2025, the population of the county was estimated to be 682,179, making it the tenth-most populous county in the state. Its county seat is Dade City, and its largest city is Zephyrhills. The county is named after United States senator Samuel Pasco.

Pasco County is included in the Tampa Bay Area and historically has been a bedroom community for the Tampa and St. Petersburg cities. It is 30 miles away from the city of Tampa. The county includes numerous parks and trails located along rivers, the Gulf of Mexico, lakes, and highway/railroad right-of-ways. Several nudist resorts are located in Pasco County. The county has become known as the "naturist capital of the United States", starting in 1941.

West Pasco includes retirement areas, commercial fishing, and suburbs of Tampa. The Suncoast Parkway as well as U.S. 19, U.S. 41, U.S. 98, U.S. 301, and Interstate 75 all pass through Pasco County. The county is directly west of Polk and Sumter counties, north of Hillsborough and Pinellas counties, and south of Hernando County.

== History ==
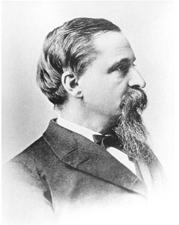
U.S. Senator Samuel Pasco

=== Early history ===
==== Native settlement ====
The earliest known residents of Pasco County were the Timucua people who lived on the land in the early 1200s. Settlers in Florida brought diseases to the area however, wiping out the tribe. Other Native American tribes like the Calusa also lived along the Gulf of Mexico in Pasco County. The tribe had a deep-rooted connection between the land and its inhabitants.

==== Exploration ====
In the 1500s, Spanish explorers came into the Florida region, encountering with the Native American tribes. This started major cultural exchanges for the groups. Pasco County, at that point became a point of interest to the Spanish explorers because of its strategic coastal location.

==== Seminole conflict ====
The Creek Native tribe from Georgia and Alabama migrated to Florida with one tribe becoming known as the Seminoles in the region. The tribe fought with the British against American settlers during the First Seminole War and had constant fighting with the Spanish until the buying of Florida to the United States in 1819. The United States military had major conflict with the Native Americans in the Second Seminole War that included the destruction of Fort Dade, of which Dade City is named after.

==== Civil war ====
When Civil War broke out in 1861, Florida joined the Confederate States of America. Though Pasco County was too far to be changed by the war in much of the conflicts, men from Pasco County supported both sides of the conflict. The closest engagement of Pasco County soldiers was in Bayport, Hernando County, Florida.

=== Founding ===
Pasco County was founded on June 2, 1887, from the southern third of Hernando County. The legislation was passed by former Governor Edward A. Perry to divide the former Hernando County into three counties. The legislation also created Citrus County from the northern third of Hernando County. The county was named after Samuel Pasco, who had just been elected to the United States Senate, though he never visited the county.

Pasco County's early towns were Anclote, Blanton, Dade City, Earnestville, Fort Dade (not to be confused with Fort Dade on Egmont Key), Macon (Trilby), Lacoochee, St. Leo, and San Antonio.

Dade City was named the temporary county seat with the same legislation to make Pasco County. It stayed temporary until March 14, 1889, when W.B. Lynch got a petition with 320 signatures to hold an election for the county seat. The board accepted the petition with the election for April 11, 1889. On April 16, 1889, Dade city won with 432 votes of the 765.

Citrus was an important industry when the county was formed in 1887. Though, in December 1894 and then again in February 1895, temperatures fell throughout the state, in an event called The Great Freeze. Many citrus growers lost their crops from the freeze in Pasco County.

=== 20th Century changes ===
As early as 1914, residents of the western part of the county proposed forming a separate county or merging with Pinellas County, as Dade City was not centrally located in the county. Several large sawmills operated in the county in the early part of the 20th century. The issue was finally resolved in 1979 with the construction of identical government centers in both New Port Richey and Dade City, now called West Pasco Government Center and East Pasco Government Center respectively.

==== Early train system ====
The SAL Tarpon Springs branch line from Tarpon Junction 14 miles west of Tampa to Elfers and thence to New Port Richey lost its passenger service and became listed as freight only between 1932 and 1938. The freight branch was truncated to Elfers in 1943. The tracks from Elfers and Chemical (an industrial area in the extreme southwest part of the county along the Anclote River west of Holiday) to Tarpon Springs had its last freight train on December 24, 1986, leaving the western half of the county without freight rail service.

The Atlantic Coast Line Railroad until 1957 ran the Southland through Trilby and Tarpon Springs, en route to St. Petersburg. The train was unusual for providing passenger service direct from Chicago (via the Pennsylvania), Cincinnati and Atlanta on a direct route through the western part of the Florida peninsula, bypassing Jacksonville. The Seaboard Coast Line (a merged line from the Atlantic Coast Line and the Seaboard Air Line) until 1971 ran a local train (the last passenger train for the region north of St. Petersburg and west of Dade City) through those towns from Jacksonville and Gainesville, bound for St. Petersburg. Prior to the 1967 merger for the SCL that service had been the western branch of the ACL's Champion from New York City. Until 1968 the SCL ran its Sunland from Washington, DC and Portsmouth, VA to Tampa.

==== Land boom ====
During the Florida land boom of the 1920s, New Port Richey became the winter home of silent screen star Thomas Meighan and golfer Gene Sarazen; Meighan attempted to bring other Hollywood figures to the city. The county has experienced significant population growth since the 1970s, growing by over 600%. The growth began along the Gulf coast but is now occurring most rapidly in areas north of Tampa.

=== Recent history ===
Pasco County has historically been a bedroom community for Tampa and St. Petersburg. Though, recent companies are constructing major centers in the county, such as Moffit Cancer Center's Speros campus, which is expected to bring over 11,000 jobs.

== Geography ==
According to the U.S. Census Bureau, Pasco County has a total area of 868 square miles (2,250 km^{2}), of which 747 sq mi (1,930 km^{2}) is land and 122 sq mi (320 km^{2}) (14.0%) is water. It is located on the Florida Nature Coast and the Tampa Bay Area, being 30 miles north from the city of Tampa, and 50 miles west from Orlando.

=== Topography and elevation ===
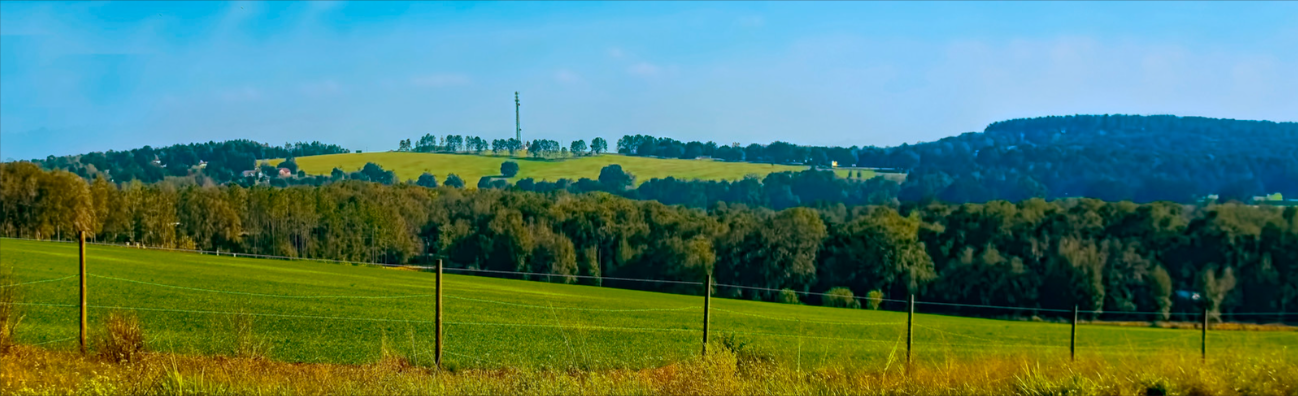
Greer Hill, Pasco County in 2017

There are six named hills in Pasco County, with the highest hill being Nursery Hill, which rises 246 feet (75 m), though the highest point in Pasco County is Clay Hill, which is 301 feet (92 m). Greer Hill, the third largest summit, has 66 homes and 120,000 square feet of office space on and around it.

Pasco County has an average elevation of 59 feet (18 m). The western part of Pasco County is relatively flat, and has tidal flats on the coast. The lowest point of the county is −3.3 feet (−1.0 m). In the eastern areas there are hills, where elevations can reach between 100 and 300 feet above sea level. The rolling terrain appears especially around communities such as San Antonio and St. Leo.

=== Bodies of water ===
==== Rivers ====
The Anclote and Pithlachascotee rivers both run through Pasco County. The two rivers have been flood-prone, and were watched during Hurricane Idalia in 2023. The Anclote river also flooded during Hurricane Milton in 2024, where it crested at 26.57 feet high.

==== Lakes ====
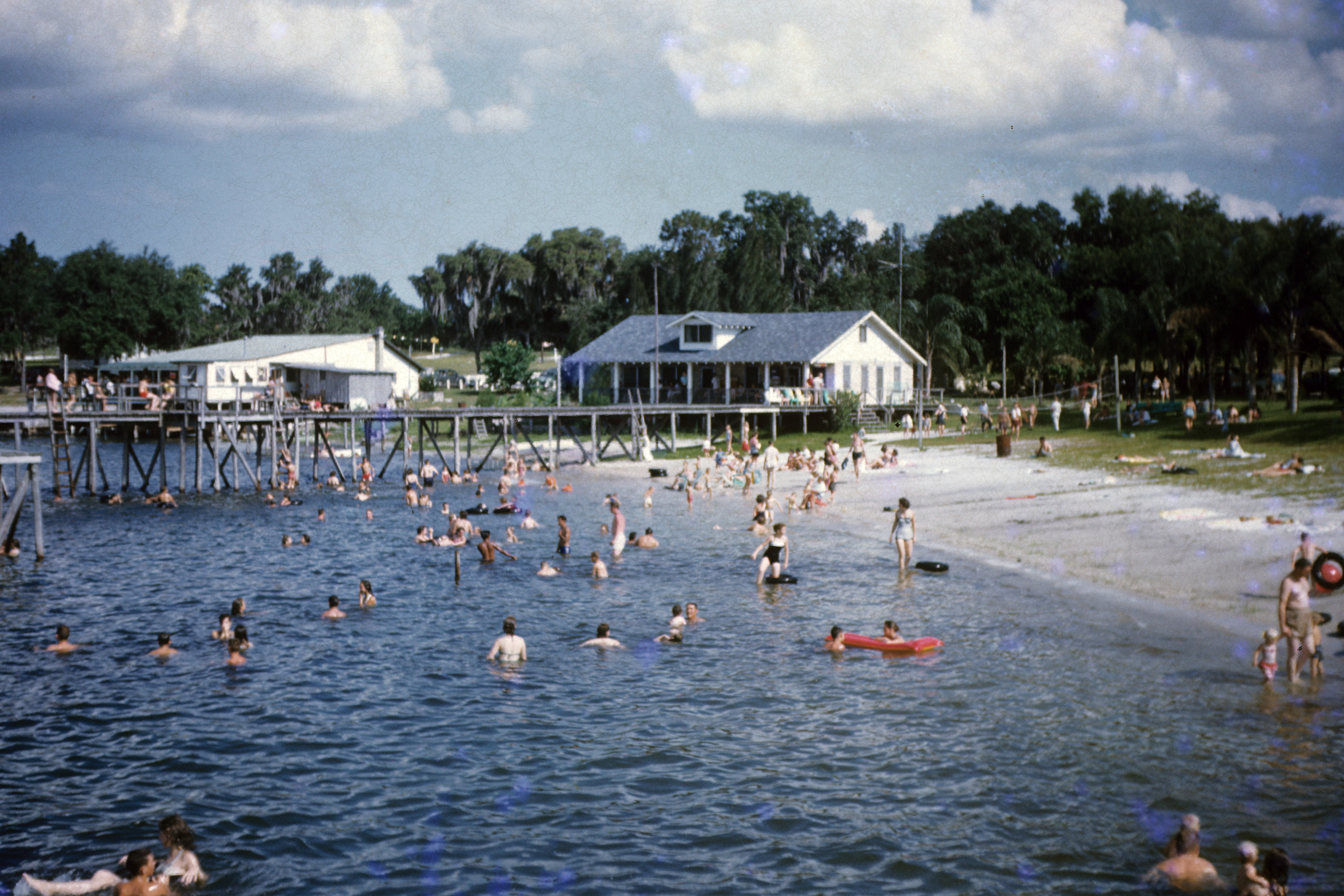
Irene Ward's place at Lake Iola in Pasco County, 1958

There are 70 lakes in Pasco County, with a total of about 6,250 acres (2,530 ha) of lake. Hancock Lake is the largest lake in the county, covering 478 acres (193 ha). There are three state parks nearby to Hancock Lake. The smallest lake, Little Moss Lake, in Pasco County only covers 2 acres (0.81 ha).

=== Anclote Key ===
Anclote Key is a barrier island, most of which is in Pasco County (the southern end is in Pinellas County). The island is about three miles long and over a mile from the mainland. North of Anclote Key the North Anclote Bar is a sand bar that has emerged above water and become vegetated since the 1990s. Anclote Key and the North Anclote Bar, as well as the South Anclote Bar and Three Rooker Island in Pinellas County, are part of the Anclote Key Preserve State Park. Anclote Key is the northernmost barrier island on the west coast of the Florida peninsula. The side of Anclote Key facing the mainland is composed of mangrove forest and tidal marsh. The island is only accessible by boat.

=== Climate ===
The county has a humid subtropical climate (Cfa) and average temperatures in Dade City range from 59.2 °F in January to 82.1 °F in July and August while in Port Richey they range from 59.0 °F in January to 82.2 °F in August.

Pasco County

Climate chart (precipitation, max. and min. temperature)
J	F	M	A	M	J	J	A	S	O	N	D
2.7 71 45	2.4 75 48	2.6 78 52	2.2 83 56	3.1 88 63	8 91 70	9 91 72	8 91 73	6.1 90 71	2.2 85 63	1.8 79 53	2.3 74 48
- █ Average max. and min. temperatures in °F
- █ Precipitation totals in inches
Metric conversion
J	F	M	A	M	J	J	A	S	O	N	D
68 22 7	60 24 9	65 26 11	56 28 13	80 31 17	203 33 21	228 33 22	203 33 23	154 32 22	56 29 17	47 26 12	57 23 9
- █ Average max. and min. temperatures in °C
- █ Precipitation totals in mm

== Demographics ==
=== Racial and ethnic composition ===
Pasco County, Florida – Racial and ethnic composition Note: the US Census treats Hispanic/Latino as an ethnic category. This table excludes Latinos from the racial categories and assigns them to a separate category. Hispanics/Latinos may be of any race.
Race / Ethnicity (NH = Non-Hispanic)	Pop 1980	Pop 1990	Pop 2000	Pop 2010	Pop 2020	% 1980	% 1990	% 2000	% 2010	% 2020	Percent change
White alone (NH)	184,022	264,308	310,066	372,239	392,375	95.03%	94.02%	89.94%	80.10%	69.83%	−10.27%
Black or African American alone (NH)	3,960	5,303	6,833	19,010	31,601	2.05%	1.89%	1.98%	4.09%	5.62%	+1.53%
Native American or Alaska Native alone (NH)	362	740	1,049	1,236	1,388	0.19%	0.26%	0.30%	0.27%	0.25%	−0.02%
Asian alone (NH)	387	1,404	3,194	9,609	16,408	0.20%	0.50%	0.93%	2.07%	2.92%	+0.85%
Native Hawaiian or Pacific Islander alone (NH)	x	x	95	223	308	x	x	0.03%	0.05%	0.05%	0.00%
Other race alone (NH)	206	67	319	686	2,771	0.11%	0.02%	0.09%	0.15%	0.49%	+0.34%
Mixed race or Multiracial (NH)	x	x	3,606	7,158	23,883	x	x	1.05%	1.54%	4.25%	+2.71%
Hispanic or Latino (any race)	4,706	9,309	19,603	54,536	93,157	2.43%	3.31%	5.69%	11.74%	16.58%	+4.84%
Total	193,643	281,131	344,765	464,697	561,891	100.00%	100.00%	100.00%	100.00%	100.00%	

=== Population ===
Historical Population of Pasco County
Census	Pop.	Note	%±
1890	4,249		—
1900	6,054	▲	42.5%
1910	7,502	▲	23.9%
1920	8,802	▲	17.3%
1930	10,574	▲	20.1%
1940	13,981	▲	32.2%
1950	20,529	▲	46.8%
1960	36,785	▲	79.2%
1970	75,955	▲	106.5%
1980	193,643	▲	154.9%
1990	281,131	▲	45.2%
2000	344,765	▲	22.6%
2010	464,697	▲	34.8%
2020	561,891	▲	20.9%
2025 (est.)	674,516	▲	20.0%
1890–1980

As of the 2020 census, the county had a population of 561,891 and 139,278 families residing there.

The median age was 45.0 years. 20.3% of residents were under the age of 18 and 22.7% of residents were 65 years of age or older. For every 100 females there were 93.6 males, and for every 100 females age 18 and over there were 91.4 males age 18 and over.

The racial makeup of the county was 74.2% White, 6.1% Black or African American, 0.4% American Indian and Alaska Native, 3.0% Asian, 0.1% Native Hawaiian and Pacific Islander, 4.7% from some other race, and 11.6% from two or more races. Hispanic or Latino residents of any race comprised 16.6% of the population.

92.8% of residents lived in urban areas, while 7.2% lived in rural areas.

There were 225,214 households in the county, of which 27.8% had children under the age of 18 living in them. Of all households, 48.9% were married-couple households, 16.8% were households with a male householder and no spouse or partner present, and 26.2% were households with a female householder and no spouse or partner present. About 26.3% of all households were made up of individuals and 13.8% had someone living alone who was 65 years of age or older.

There were 256,783 housing units, of which 12.3% were vacant. Among occupied housing units, 73.4% were owner-occupied and 26.6% were renter-occupied. The homeowner vacancy rate was 2.5% and the rental vacancy rate was 9.2%.

=== Age, density, and income ===
As of 2025, the population was 682,179, making Pasco County the tenth-most populous county in Florida. 10.5% of people are in poverty as of 2023, with the average per capita personal income being $56,734 a person. The population density was 913 per square mile (328/km^{2}).

== Government and politics ==
Though the county seat is in Dade City, duplicate county government offices and court facilities are also located in the New Port Richey area on the west side of the county.

The Pasco County Board of County Commissioners (BCC) is the legislative and policy-making group of the county's government. Representatives from five different Pasco County districts are elected from throughout the county and serve four-year terms in BCC. The Board of County Commissioners creates policies through the adding of ordinances and adoption of resolutions.

=== Election voting ===
United States presidential election results for Pasco County, Florida
Year	Republican		Democratic		Third party(ies)	
Year	No.	%	No.	%	No.	%
1892	0	0.00%	471	83.22%	95	16.78%
1896	70	12.46%	482	85.77%	10	1.78%
1900	32	5.51%	492	84.68%	57	9.81%
1904	96	16.84%	453	79.47%	21	3.68%
1908	81	14.21%	436	76.49%	53	9.30%
1912	60	8.34%	485	67.45%	174	24.20%
1916	236	19.82%	779	65.41%	176	14.78%
1920	630	33.44%	1,166	61.89%	88	4.67%
1924	472	32.42%	780	53.57%	204	14.01%
1928	1,591	54.26%	1,308	44.61%	33	1.13%
1932	806	24.35%	2,504	75.65%	0	0.00%
1936	1,159	34.21%	2,229	65.79%	0	0.00%
1940	1,362	30.59%	3,091	69.41%	0	0.00%
1944	1,352	34.89%	2,523	65.11%	0	0.00%
1948	1,839	37.68%	2,375	48.66%	667	13.67%
1952	4,562	56.24%	3,549	43.76%	0	0.00%
1956	5,501	56.82%	4,181	43.18%	0	0.00%
1960	7,188	55.21%	5,832	44.79%	0	0.00%
1964	7,606	48.32%	8,135	51.68%	0	0.00%
1968	9,743	42.36%	6,292	27.36%	6,966	30.29%
1972	29,249	71.91%	11,330	27.85%	97	0.24%
1976	28,306	45.11%	33,710	53.72%	731	1.16%
1980	50,120	56.67%	34,054	38.50%	4,268	4.83%
1984	66,618	61.92%	40,962	38.07%	8	0.01%
1988	63,820	55.59%	50,385	43.89%	598	0.52%
1992	47,735	35.11%	53,130	39.08%	35,097	25.81%
1996	48,355	36.23%	66,475	49.80%	18,641	13.97%
2000	68,607	48.05%	69,576	48.73%	4,586	3.21%
2004	103,230	54.07%	84,749	44.39%	2,937	1.54%
2008	110,104	51.07%	102,417	47.51%	3,068	1.42%
2012	112,427	52.48%	98,263	45.86%	3,558	1.66%
2016	142,101	58.41%	90,142	37.06%	11,022	4.53%
2020	179,621	59.36%	119,073	39.35%	3,927	1.30%
2024	197,779	61.87%	117,450	36.74%	4,435	1.39%

Pasco County was a swing county for much of the 20th Century. It has supported Republicans in every election since 2004 when it supported George W. Bush before swinging more leftward in the 2008 election (though Democrat Barack Obama lost the county, it was only by less than 4 percent). Since then, the county has trended more Republican in every election. Most recently in 2024, Donald Trump had 62% of the popular vote for the first time since 1984.

Political Party	Number of registered voters (February 3, 2026)	Percent
Republican	177,719	45.41%
Democratic	97,340	24.87%
Third parties	16,584	4.24%
Independent	99,711	25.48%
Total	391,354	100.00%

== Transportation ==
=== Aviation ===
- Zephyrhills Municipal Airport (ZPH)
- Pilot Country Airport (X05)
- Tampa North Aero Park (X39)
- Hidden Lake Estates Airport (FA40, private airport near Moon Lake)

=== Bus service ===
Pasco County Public Transportation (GOPASCO) provides several bus services throughout Pasco County.

As of February 2026, GOPASCO has 14 routes that serve the county. Notable routes include Route 18, connecting up to the Pinellas County Bus System (PSTA) and Clearwater Jolley Trolley, Route 19, connecting up to the PSTA, Route 21, connecting to Hernando County Transit (TheBus), and Route 54, connecting New Port Richey to Zephyrhills, and connecting to Hillsborough Area Regional Transit (HART).

=== Railroads ===
CSX Transportation operates three freight rail lines within the county. Dade City and Zephyrhills are served by the Wildwood Subdivision. The other two lines include the Brooksville Subdivision which runs close to US 41 and the Vitis Subdivision, which runs southeast into Lakeland. Amtrak formerly provided passenger rail service to Dade City on that line, but the stop was terminated in late 2004.

=== Major roads ===
- I-75 (Interstate 75 / SR 93) runs north and south across the eastern part of the county. Once a major connecting point with Tampa, I-75 has been made obsolete for western residents of the county by the Suncoast Parkway. I-75 has six Pasco County exits; I-275 (Exit 274, southbound only), SR 56 (Exit 275), SR 54 (Exit 279), Overpass Road (Exit 282), SR 52 (Exit 285), and CR 41 (Exit 293).
- Suncoast Parkway enters the county in the south halfway between Gunn Highway and US 41, and ends in the far northern part of the county at County Line Road (Exit 37), The Suncoast Parkway is a recently constructed toll road that connects Pasco County with Hillsborough County, where it becomes the Veterans Expressway and heads directly into Tampa International Airport before reaching Interstate 275. SR 589 has four Pasco County exits: SR 54 (Exit 19), Ridge Road (Exit 25), SR 52 (Exit 27), and County Line Road (Exit 37).
- US 19 (/ SR 55) is a major commercial center running beside to the Gulf of Mexico on the western edge of the county, and used as a primary connecting route to cities down the west coast of Florida, including Tarpon Springs, Dunedin, Clearwater, and St. Petersburg to the south, as well as Spring Hill, Weeki Wachee, Homosassa and Crystal River to the north.
- US 19 Alt. (Pinellas Avenue / SR 595) is a former section of US 19 that runs closer to the Gulf of Mexico in Pinellas and southern Pasco County than US 19.
- US 41 (Land O' Lakes Boulevard / SR 45) is the main south-to-north U.S. Highway through Central Pasco County. It enters the county from Lutz in Hillsborough County and serves as a commercial strip through most of Land O' Lakes. Further north the road becomes more rural, passing through Gowers Corner, and eventually enters Masaryktown at the Hernando County Line.
- US 98 (/ SR 700) runs northwest and southeast from Hernando County to Polk County. Concurrent with US 301 between Trilacoochee and Clinton Heights.
- US 301 (Fort King Highway/Gall Boulevard) is the main south-to-north U.S. highway in eastern Pasco County. It enters the county from Hillsborough River State Park in Hillsborough County and becomes the main road in Zephyrhills, Clinton Heights, and Dade City. North of Dade City, the road runs through Trilacoochee and Trilby before it enters Ridge Manor in Hernando County at a bridge over the Withlacoochee River.
- SR 39 runs northwest and southeast from Plant City into US 301 in Zephyrhills
- SR 41 / CR 41 (Fort King Highway/17th Street/21st Street/Blanton Road) begins as a hidden state road along US 301 until it branches off to the northwest as a county road in Zephyrhills and runs parallel to US 301 until it reaches Dade City. From here it moves further to the west through Blanton and Jessamine, and after crossing over I-75 curves back north into rural Hernando County where it becomes CR 541.
- CR 578 (County Line Road) is a major county road running entirely along the border with Hernando County beginning at US 19, intersects the Suncoast Parkway, and ends at US 41. Due to increased congestion, it is planned to be upgraded from two to four lanes, and possibly upgraded from a county road to a state road.
- SR 52 (Colonel Schrader Memorial Highway) an east–west route that runs primarily through the center of the county from US 19 in Bayonet Point to US 98–301 in Dade City.
- SR 54 (Gunn Highway/Fifth Avenue) another east–west road that runs through southern Pasco County, from US 19 near Holiday to US 301 in Zephyrhills.
- SR 56 is an east–west route that extends from SR 54 near Land O' Lakes, to just east of Bruce B. Downs Boulevard and the new campus of Pasco–Hernando State College in Wesley Chapel. The road was constructed in 2002, and is planned, as of 2016, to be extended to US 301 south of Zephyrhills.
- SR 575 the northernmost state road in Pasco County.
- SR 581 (Bruce B. Downs Boulevard)
- CR 77 (Rowan Road/East Lake Road)
- SR 597 (Dale Mabry Highway)
- CR 587 (Moon Lake Road/Decubellis Road/Massachusetts Avenue) (N)
- CR 587 (Gunn Highway) (S) is a short north and south extension of Gunn Highway(SR 54) that runs through Northern Hillsborough County towards Dale Mabry Highway and Busch Boulevard.
- CR 1 (Little Road) is a major four to six lane county road in western Pasco County bypassing US 19 between southeast of Aripeka and Trinity.
- CR 996 (Trinity Boulevard) is a southwest to northeast road extending from the Pinellas County Line to SR 54 west of Odessa. It was built upon the former right-of-way for the Orange Belt Railway.

== Public safety ==
=== Sheriff's Office ===
The Pasco County Sheriff's Office is the law enforcement agency responsible for Pasco County and is the county's largest law enforcement agency.

Between 2011 and 2023, the agency implemented a controversial "Intelligence-Led Policing" program, which utilized student data and other metrics to identify "at-risk" individuals. The program was the subject of a Pulitzer Prize-winning investigation by the Tampa Bay Times and resulted in a 2024 federal settlement in which the Sheriff's Office admitted to violating the constitutional rights of residents.

=== Corrections ===
The Pasco County Jail (Land O' Lakes Detention Center) is managed by the Pasco County Corrections Department. Management of the jail was transferred from the Sheriff's Office to the Board of County Commissioners in October 2022 following budget disputes.

=== Pasco County Fire Rescue ===
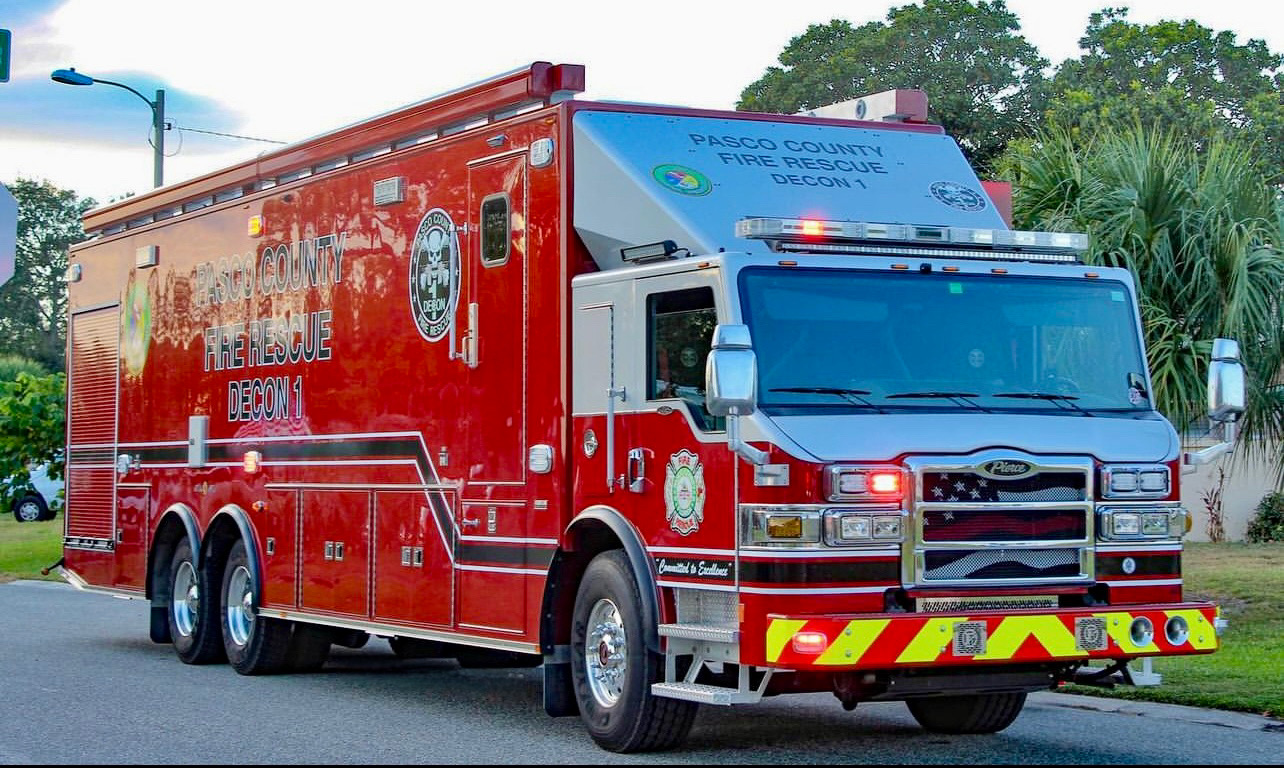
Pasco County Fire Rescue on-scene decontamination apparatus (Decon 1)

Pasco County Fire Rescue (PCFR) provides fire protection and emergency medical services throughout the county. Pasco County Fire Rescue has 30 stations placed around Pasco County. Their headquarters, located in Land O' Lakes holds the administration, staff chief, public information, community risk reduction, and ambulance billing departments. The ambulance billing department oversees all ambulance billing including Citrus County, and Hernando County fire rescue.

Pasco County Fire Rescue also has a mobile integrated health program to help those after an overdose. The program can help patients with medical and dental needs, mental health and therapy, transportation to medical appointments, withdrawal management, counseling, and shelter/housing. The agency has two arson investigators and three fire investigators that determine the origin and cause of fires throughout unincorporated Pasco County. Pasco County Fire Rescue conducts all fire inspections within the unincorporated portions of the county.

== Education ==
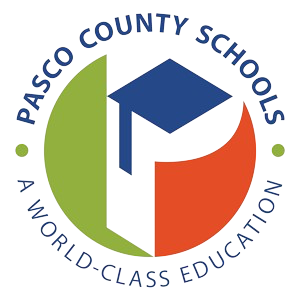
The Pasco County Schools logo

=== Pasco County Schools ===
Public schools in the county are operated by Pasco County Schools. The school board was founded in 1887, the year the county was founded, with Augustine H. Ravesies appointed as the county's first superintendent of schools.

Today, it is the 48th largest school district in the United States compared to over 14,000 schools, and the 10th largest school district in Florida out of 67 schools. As of the 2024–2025 school year, there were a total of 106 schools in Pasco County Schools.

In March 2024, the district reached a settlement with the United States Department of Justice (DOJ) following an investigation which found that the district had engaged in discrimination against students with disabilities, specifically regarding student discipline and referrals to law enforcement.

=== Colleges and universities ===
- Pasco–Hernando State College
- Rasmussen University
- Saint Leo University
- Trinity College of Florida

== Museums ==
=== Aripeka Historical Museum ===
The Aripeka Historical Museum sits in the Aripeka Library and offers displays of chert and flint from Native Americans.

=== Dade City Heritage and Cultural Museum ===
The Dade City Heritage and Cultural Museum sits in where the old Dade City Train Depot sat.

=== Pioneer Florida Museum & Village ===
The Pioneer Florida Museum & Village sits in the former Trilby Depot, one-room school house, and a restored house from 1860. The museum offers displays of how the pioneers of Florida lived.

=== Museum of Archaeology, Paleontology and Science Museum (MAPS) ===
The MAPS museum is located at Wendell Krinn Technical High School and offers artifacts from civilizations such as the Inca and Aztec.

=== National Comedy Hall of Fame ===
The National Comedy Hall of Fame is located in Holiday, Florida. The museum offers memorabilia of comedians such as Jack Benny and Robin Williams.

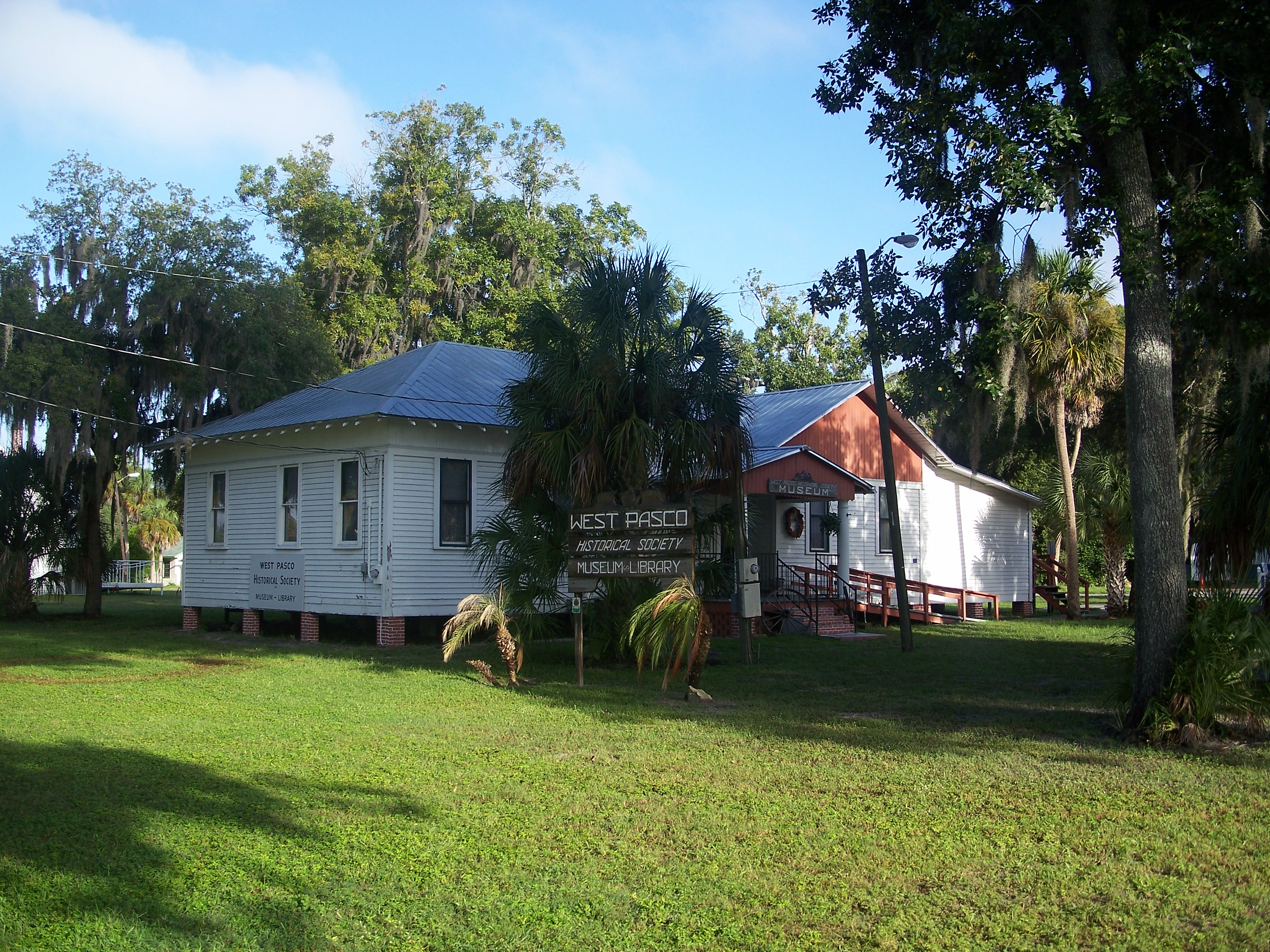
West Pasco Historical Society Museum and Library before the Sims Park renovations.

=== West Pasco Historical Society Museum and Library ===
Also called the Rao Musunuru, M.D. Museum & Library, the West Pasco Historical Society Museum and Library is located in Sims Park in New Port Richey, Florida. It offers sections such as Native American history and the history of New Port Richey.

=== Zephyrhills Museum of Military History ===
the Zephyrhills Museum of Military History is located at the Zephyrhills Municipal Airport and offers a vast collection of military planes and artifacts, mostly from World War II.

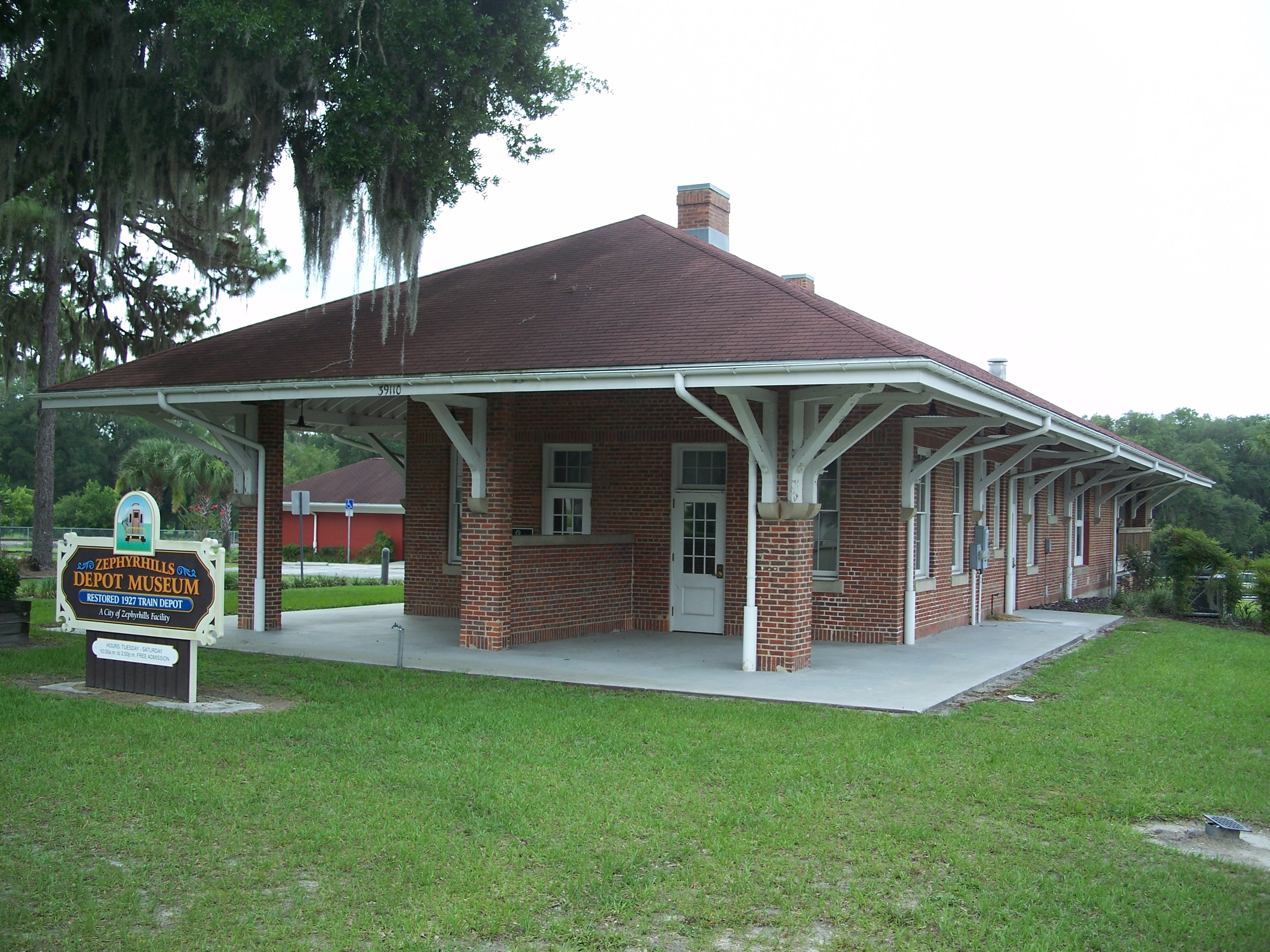
Zephyrhills Depot Museum

=== Zephyrhills Train Depot Museum ===
The Zephyrhills Train Depot Museum sits on the 1927 Atlantic Coast Line Railroad in Zephyrhills, Florida. It offers a collection with a model train, and several displays.

== Libraries ==
=== Pasco County Library Cooperative ===
The Pasco County Library Cooperative is the public library system that serves residents of Pasco County. It consists of eight branch libraries and one cooperative partner, the Zephyrhills Public Library.

==== Pasco County Library Cooperative Libraries ====
- Centennial Park Branch Library
- Hudson Library
- Hugh Embry Branch Library
- Land O' Lakes Branch Library
- New River Branch Library
- Regency Park Branch Library
- Starkey Ranch Theatre Library Cultural Center
- South Holiday Branch Library
- Zephyrhills Public Library (partner)

=== New Port Richey Public Library ===
The New Port Richey Public Library is located in the New Port Richey area of Pasco County. It is the only public library in Pasco County that is not a part of the Pasco County Library Cooperative. Since the library is independent, it issues its own library cards. Cards are free for all Pasco County residents and for those who pay property taxes to the city of New Port Richey. Members of libraries which have reciprocal borrowing agreements with the NPR library are also issued free cards.

=== Aripeka Library ===
While the Aripeka Library is small and is not a "public" library, it has over 5,000 books. Being in the same building as the Aripeka Historical Museum, volunteers work on it to keep it open and to maintain its connection to the area's history.

== Media ==
=== Pasco Films ===
Pasco Films is a movie production company based in Pasco County. Pharmboy is one of the produced films made by Pasco Films, which got funded by Pasco County Commissioners. The movie was played at The Gasparilla International Film Festival in 2013, winning the audience award in the Narrative Feature category.

=== Sets ===
A Pasco County home in Lutz, Florida was used as one of the main sets used in the movie Edward Scissorhands. It is one of Tampa Bay's most famous cinematic homes.

== Parks and recreation ==
Pasco county has hundreds of recreational parks and activities, such as beaches, sports, historical, trails, playgrounds, recreational complexes and preserves. In total, Pasco County has 6,900 Acres of Environmentally Sensitive Land and 15,000 Acres of Park Land, Trails and Open Space.

Many are operated by Pasco County themselves, but many are also city and state operated:

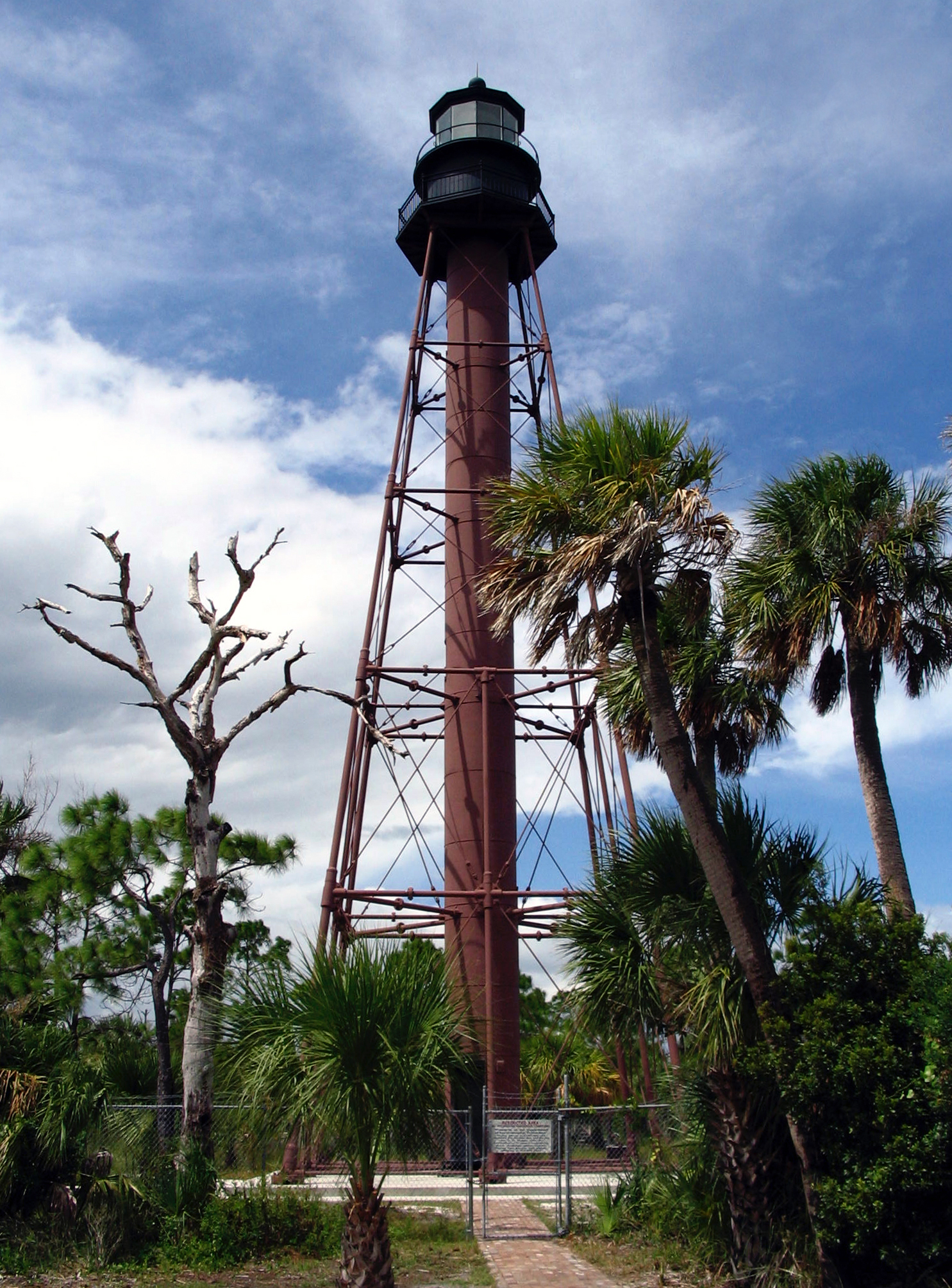
Anclote Key Lighthouse at Anclote Key Preserve State Park

=== State Parks ===
The list of state parks in Pasco County:

- Anclote Key Preserve State Park
- Werner-Boyce Salt Springs State Park

=== County Parks ===
The list of county parks in Pasco County

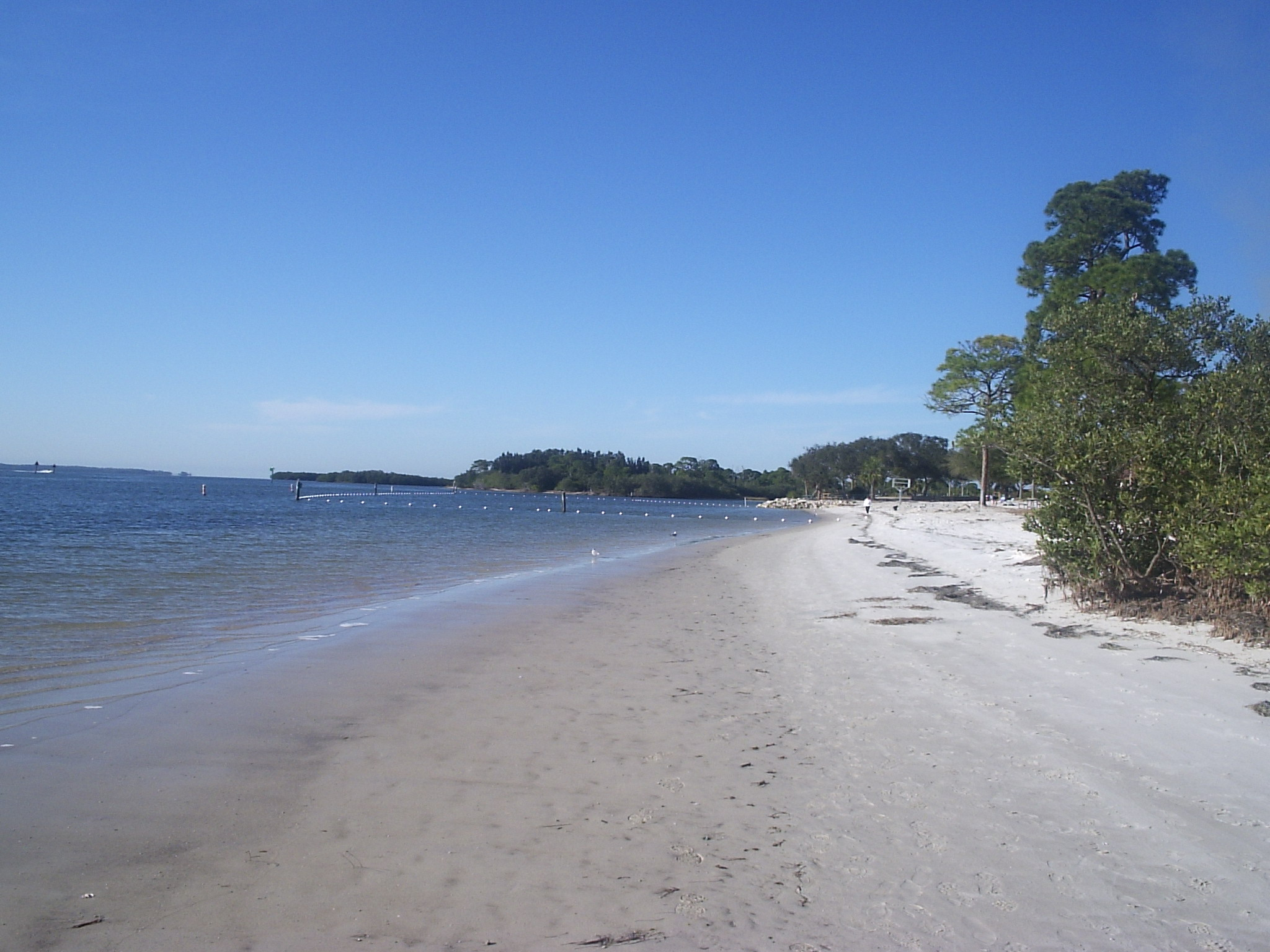
Southern Beach at Anclote River Park

==== Preserves and Conservation Areas ====
- Aripeka Sandhills Preserve
- Boy Scout Preserve
- Pasco Palms Preserve

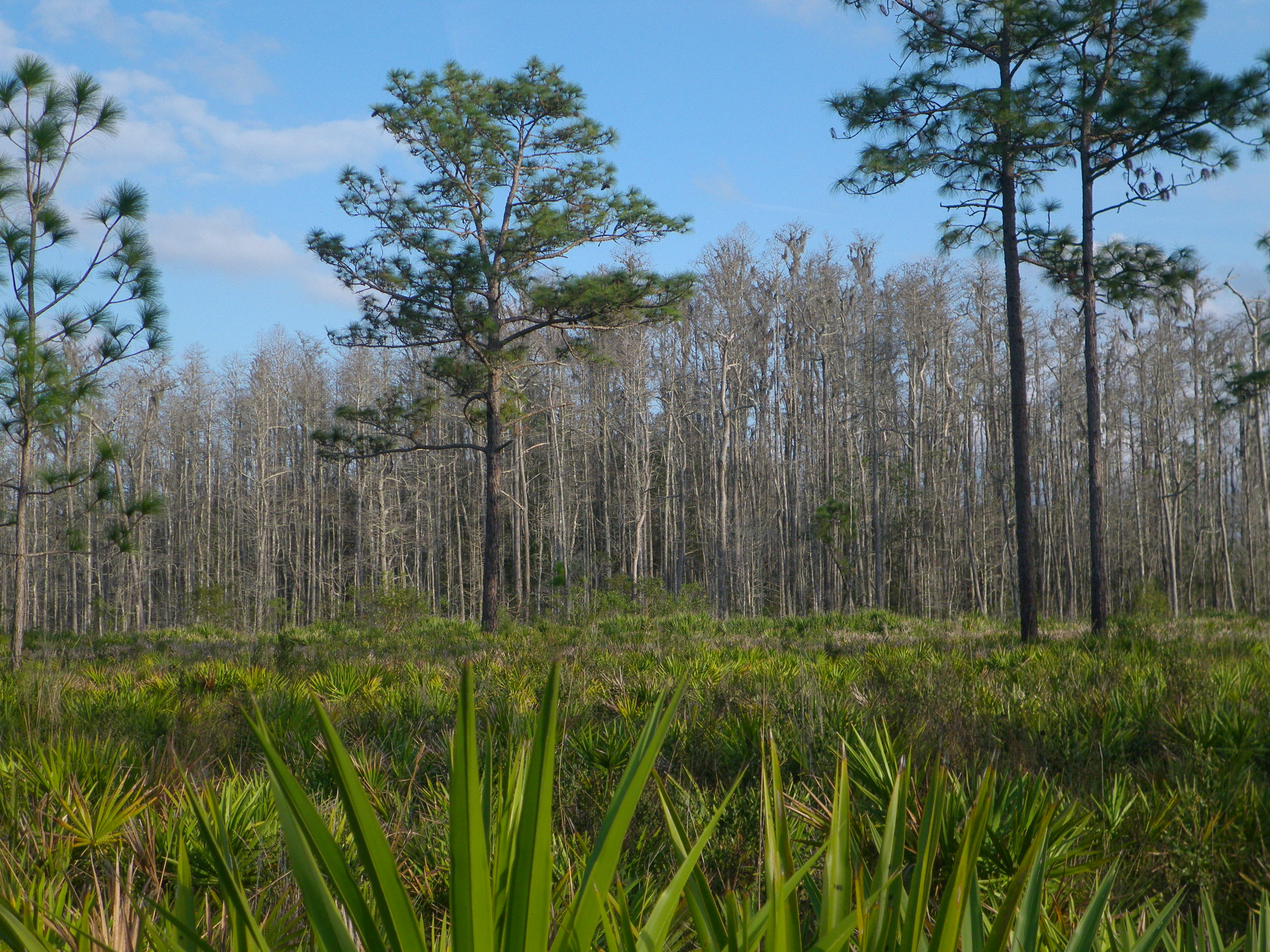
Forest at Jay B Starkey Wilderness Park

==== Wilderness Parks ====
- Crews Lake Wilderness Park
- Jay B. Starkey Wilderness Park
- Withlacoochee River Park

=== Trails ===
Pasco County has many trails, with over 65 miles of paved and 250 miles of unpaved trails in the county. It also has 80 miles of designated blueways.

=== Sports ===
Pasco County is in an area known as Florida’s Sports Coast after it opened Wiregrass Ranch Sports Campus of Pasco County in Wesley Chapel. It is 98,000 square feet, providing a new venue for sports. Pasco County has over 24 provided different sports.

Pasco County’s sports tourism agency said that visitors spent more than $636 million in fiscal year 2022 in Pasco County, up 24% from 2021 for sports.

== Communities ==
Incorporated municipalities of Pasco County

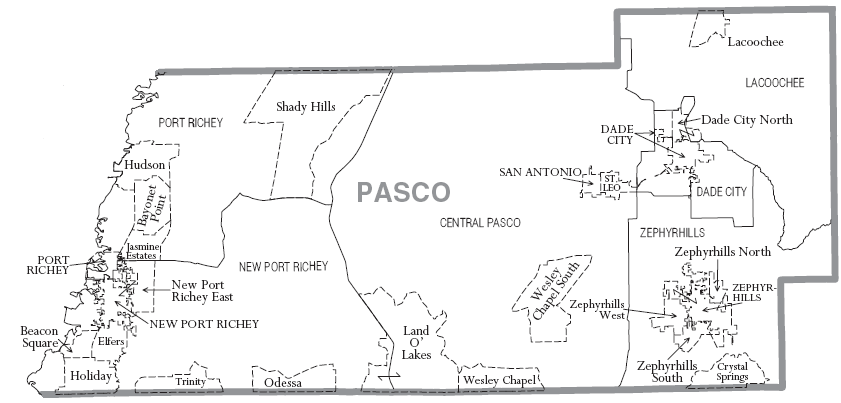
County map by the U.S. census

Pasco County's largest city is Zephyrhills, a main location of the Zephyrhills water brand, with over 22,000 population as of 2024. The 2025 estimate of Zephyrhills is 23,300.

West Pasco County includes many commercial fishing, retirement areas, and suburbs of Tampa.

Several nudist resorts are located in Pasco County. The county has become known as the "naturist capital of the United States", beginning with the development in 1941.

Name	Type of community	Population (2020)
Aripeka (part)	Census-designated place	320
Bayonet Point	Census-designated place	26,713
Beacon Square	Census-designated place	8,320
Connerton	Census-designated place	5,282
Crystal Springs	Census-designated place	1,268
Dade City	City	7,275
Dade City North	Census-designated place	3,002
Elfers	Census-designated place	14,573
Heritage Pines	Census-designated place	2,171
Holiday	Census-designated place	24,939
Hudson	Census-designated place	12,944
Jasmine Estates	Census-designated place	21,525
Key Vista	Census-designated place	1,680
Lacoochee	Census-designated place	1,124
Land O' Lakes	Census-designated place	35,929
Meadow Oaks	Census-designated place	2,842
Moon Lake	Census-designated place	4,817
New Port Richey	City	16,728
New Port Richey East	Census-designated place	11,015
Odessa	Census-designated place	8,080
Pasadena Hills	Census-designated place	11,120
Port Richey	City	3,052
Quail Ridge	Census-designated place	2,195
River Ridge	Census-designated place	13,591
San Antonio	City	1,297
Shady Hills	Census-designated place	11,690
St. Leo	Town	2,362
Trilby	Census-designated place	433
Trinity	Census-designated place	11,924
Wesley Chapel	Census-designated place	64,866
Zephyrhills	City	17,194
Zephyrhills North	Census-designated place	2,663
Zephyrhills South	Census-designated place	4,985
Zephyrhills West	Census-designated place	5,533

=== Unincorporated communities ===
- Angeline
- Blanton
- Branchborough
- Darby
- Gulf Harbors
- Hudson Beach
- Jessamine
- Lumberton
- Richland
- Seven Springs
- St. Joseph
- Starkey Ranch
- Trilacoochee
- Vitis

== Notable people ==
=== Musicians ===
- Debbie Deb, freestyle singer; resides in New Port Richey
- Johnny Cash, gospel and country singer; visited Port Richey
- The Bellamy Brothers, country music duo known for the hit "Let Your Love Flow"; from Darby

=== Other ===
- Brooke Magnanti, scientist and author of Secret Diary of a Call Girl; was born in New Port Richey
- John Cena, actor and professional wrestler; resides in Land O' Lakes

== See also ==
- National Register of Historic Places listings in Pasco County, Florida
- List of counties in Florida
