= Pasco County Libraries =

Public library system in Florida

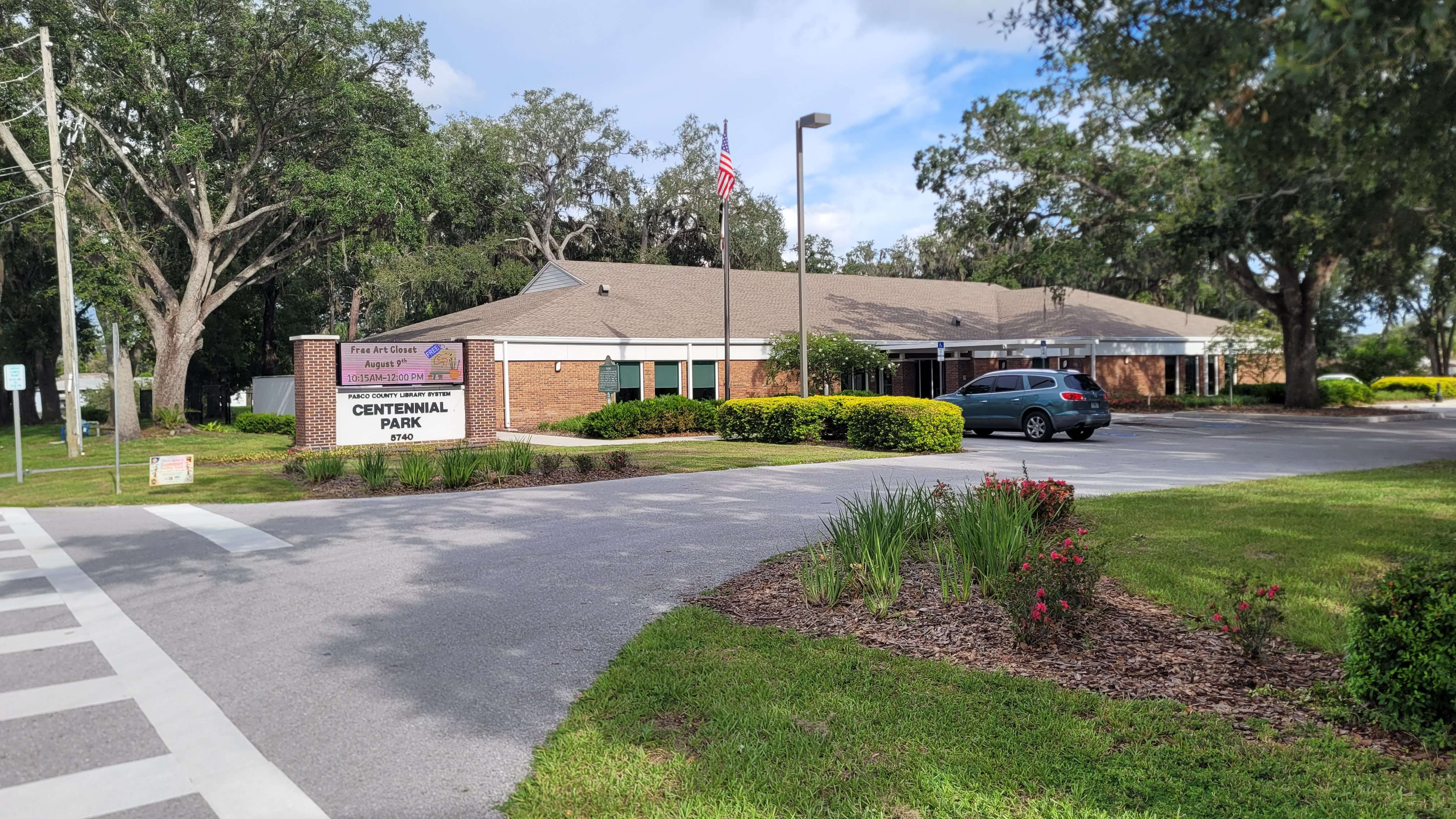
- Picture of the Centennial Park Library, one of the PCLS branches
- 28.3535°N 82.6814°W
- Location: 8012 Library Road, Hudson, Florida, 34667
- Established: July 22, 1980; 46 years ago
- Branches: 8

Other information
- Director: Sean McGarvey
- Website: https://www.pascolibraries.org/

Pasco County Libraries (PCLS) is the public library system that serves all residents of Pasco County, Florida, and is a member of the Tampa Bay Library Consortium. The Pasco County Library Cooperative (PCLC), which encompasses all of the libraries in the system, was established by county ordinance in 1980. It consists of eight branch libraries and Zephyrhills Public Library, a cooperative partner library.

Pasco County Libraries operated on a budget of $6,205,291 for fiscal year 2016–2017. Pasco Libraries circulated 2,623,024 items during that period. The head of library services reports to the Assistant County Administrator for Public Services.

Patrons have access to e-content such as databases, eBooks and audio books through Overdrive, Hoopla, Flipster Magazines, and The New York Times. It also provides eGovernment resources as well as computers.

== History ==
Pasco County Libraries was established on July 22, 1980 to form the Pasco County Library System (PCLS), which are the branches operated by the county. There were municipal-owned and operated libraries in three different cities that were not a part of the system: Dade City, New Port Richey, and Zephyrhills. Three libraries operated by volunteers in the communities of Hudson, Holiday, and Land O' Lakes, were also incorporated into the system. The Dade City library joined the system in 1981, while the Zephyrhills library is a cooperative partner, and the New Port Richey library is not a part of the system.

In 1986, a $10 million bond referendum was passed by voters to improve the public libraries and build new parks countywide. After the referendum was passed, two facilities were replaced (Hudson and Land O' Lakes) and two facilities were built in un-served areas (Regency Park and South Holiday). The referendum renovated and expanded the Hugh Embry Library. With additional funding from Federal programs, the Centennial Park Library and New River Library were also built.

In 1999, the Pasco County Public Library Cooperative was established as a result of an Interlocal Agreement between the Pasco County Board of County Commissioners and the Zephyrhills City Council.

== Branches ==
Pasco County Libraries consists of eight Pasco County Library System branches and one cooperative partner, Zephyrhills Public Library, as well as a new branch under construction. The administrative offices for the system are located at the Hudson Regional Library.

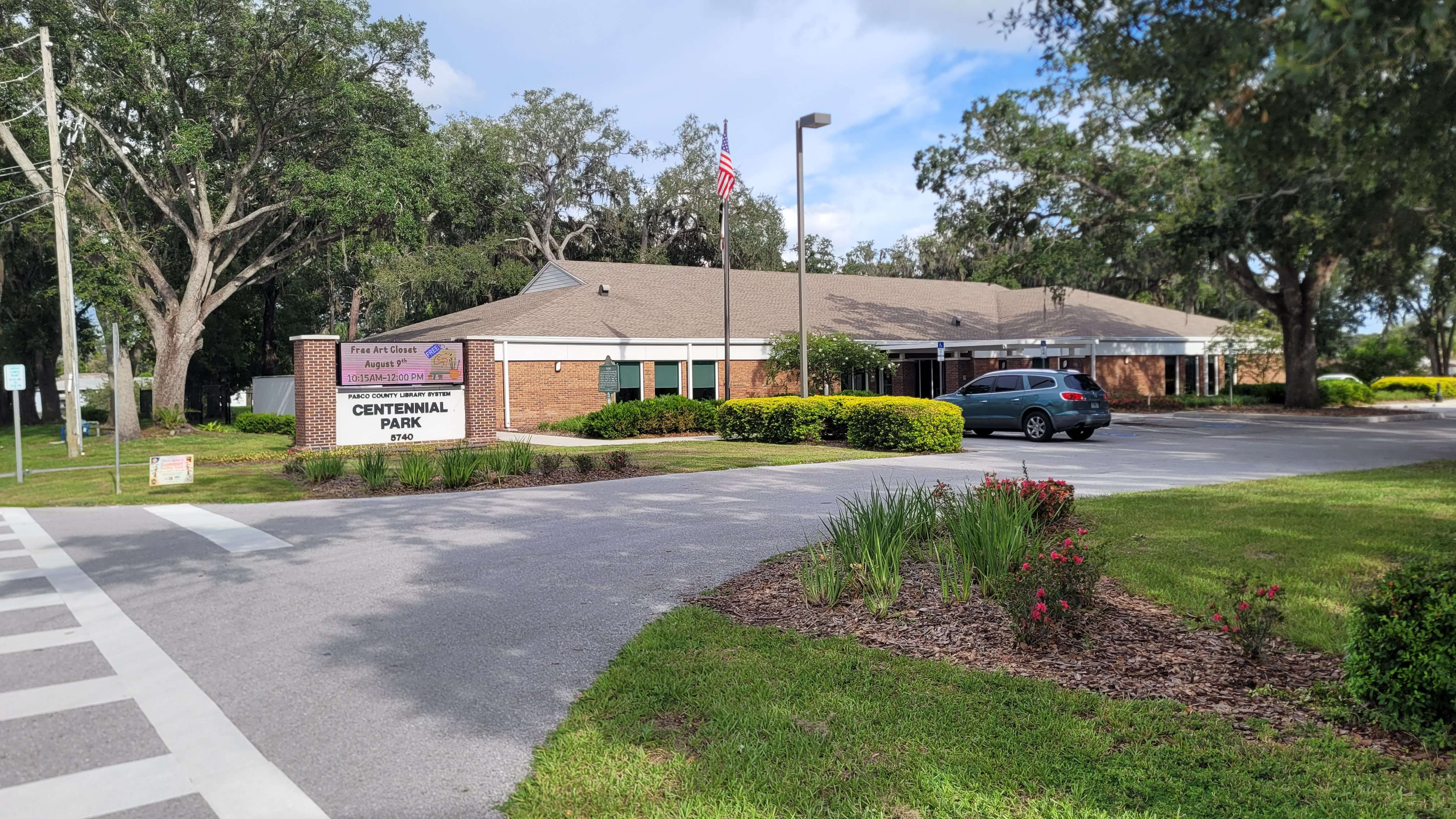
The Centennial Park Library in Holiday, Florida

=== Centennial Park Branch Library ===
The Centennial Park Branch Library opened on September 20, 1987. It provides computers, and a makerspace called The Loft, meant for arts and crafts. It sits on the property next to the historic Baker House, built in 1882.

=== Hudson Regional Library ===
The Hudson Regional Library opened on April 22, 1990, and is the largest library in Pasco County Libraries, and serves as its headquarters. This location also allows Pasco County Libraries to include several support services such as catalog development, processing, delivery, among many others.

On November 1, 2025, the library closed down for renovations which will include repairs and making the library have a beach theme. The library is expected to reopen in late 2027.

=== Hugh Embry Branch Library ===
The Hugh Embry Library was established in 1904 in Dade City, Florida. It provides computers, study rooms, and programs for all ages such as book clubs, reading clubs, gaming, story time, and family movies.

=== Land O' Lakes Branch Library ===
The Land O' Lakes Branch Library opened on December 12, 1991. The library has a drive-through, an expanded lobby, multiple study rooms, outdoor areas, and a makerspace for classes such as woodworking.

=== New River Branch Library ===
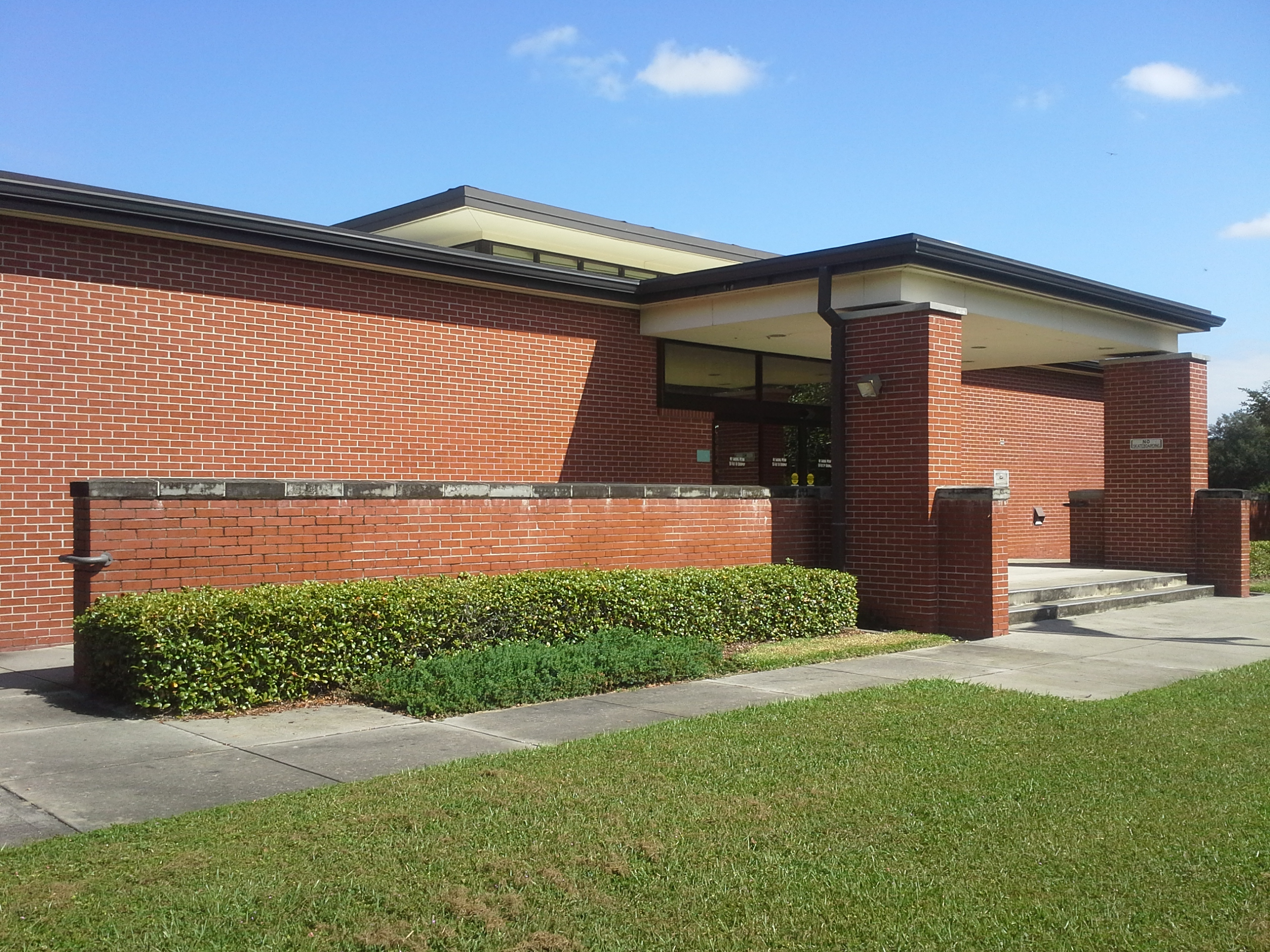
The New River Library in Wesley Chapel, Florida

New River Branch Library opened on October 31, 1991. It offers many standard library services including books, audio books, DVDs, and large meeting spaces. It also features a seed library, where residents can take seeds to grow food and plants.

=== Regency Park Branch Library ===
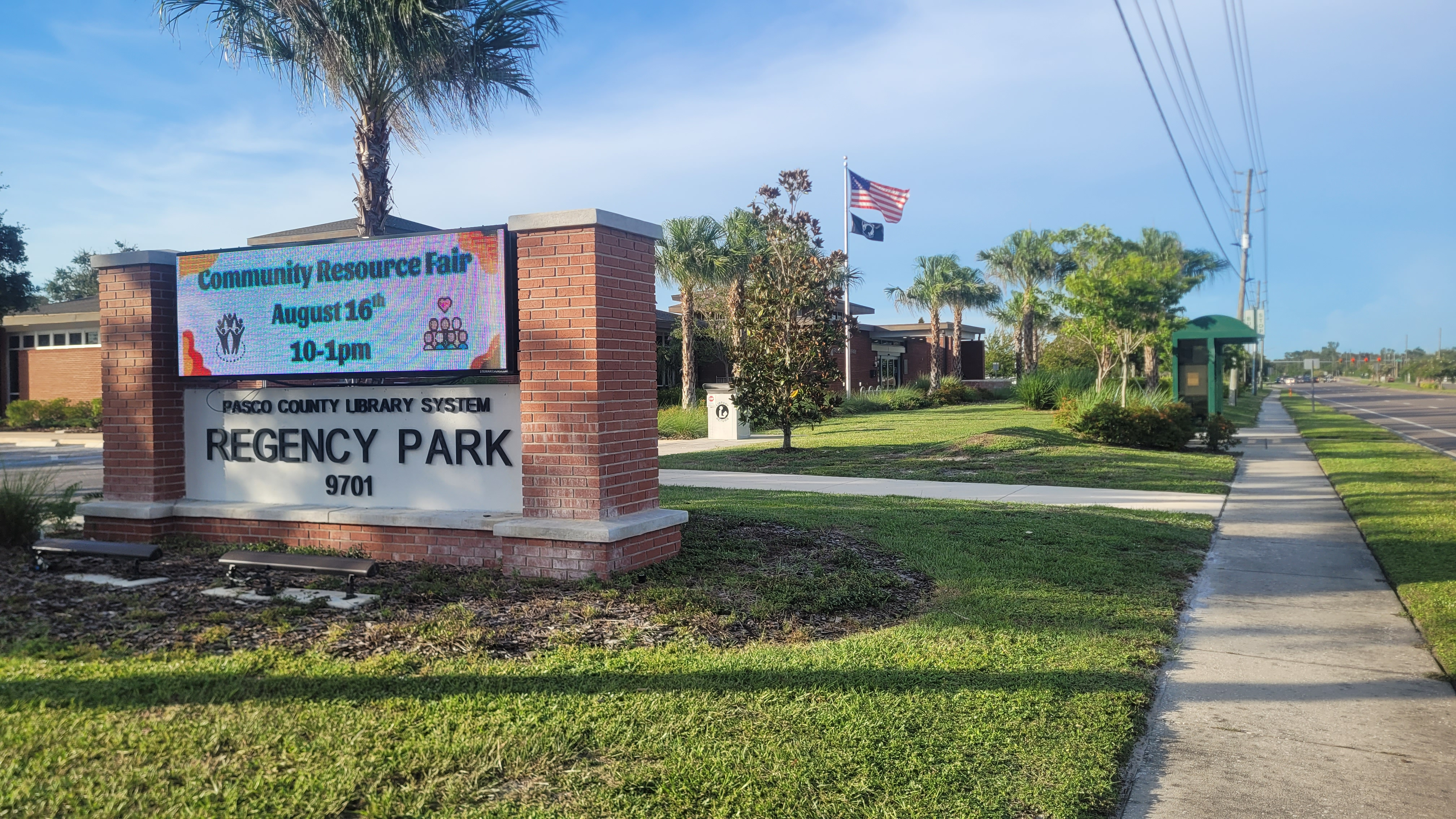
The Regency Park Library in New Port Richey, Florida

The Regency Park Branch Library opened on October 26, 1990. The library offers many standard library services including books, audio books, DVDs, and large meeting spaces. It also features a test kitchen makerspace, Regency Fresh, which opened to the public on October 17, 2019.

=== South Holiday Branch Library ===
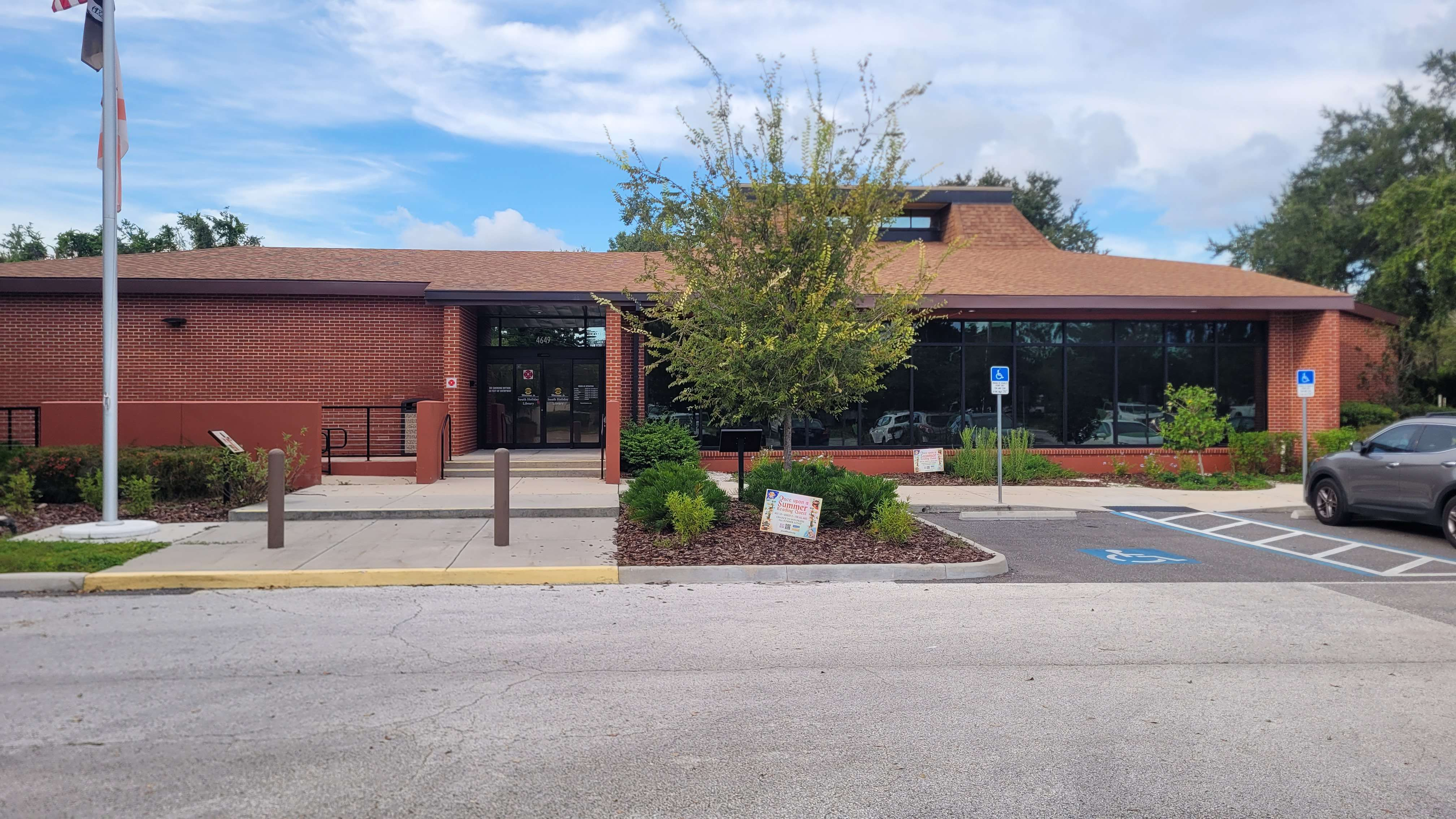
The South Holiday Library in Holiday, Florida

The South Holiday Branch Library opened on March 24, 1992. The library has over 54,000 volumes, and circulates over 146,000.

=== Starkey Ranch Theatre Library Cultural Center ===
The Starkey Ranch Theatre Library Cultural Center opened in 2021. The library's children's section used as the school library for Starkey Ranch K-8 school close by. The rest of the facility is open to the public during school hours.

=== Zephyrhills Public Library (Cooperative Partner) ===
The Zephyrhills Public Library was founded in 1912. In 1999, the library, together with the Pasco County Library System, formed the Pasco County Library Cooperative.

=== Wesley Chapel Library ===
With its grand opening on July 21st, 2026, the Wesley Chapel Library opened to the public. It includes a lawn space, reading porch, and a lot of scenery. The library also has a multipurpose room instead of a makerspace, which will include the ability for multiple activities such as wood working, gardening, and cooking.

== Makerspaces ==
Pasco County Libraries offers seven makerspaces at different library branches, and a mobile makerspace:

=== Clay Works Ceramics Studio ===
The Clay Works Ceramics Studio is the makerspace at the Starkey Ranch Theatre Library Cultural Center. The makerspace includes tools such as a kiln and a slab roller. The makerspace offers pottery classes to teach how to shape, mold, and paint pottery.

=== Discovery Gardens ===
The Discovery Gardens is the makerspace at the New River Branch Library. The makerspace includes five different gardens including a seasonal flower garden and a community garden for residents to use.

=== The Foundry ===
The Foundry is the makerspace at the Land O' Lakes Branch Library. Additionally, it is the first dedicated makerspace for Pasco County Libraries. It officially opened on December 17, 2015. The Foundry is equipped with two 3-D printers, as well as computer-aided-design (CAD) equipment, an Oculus Rift virtual reality system, and an audio recording studio. Other makerspace materials include various hand tools, power tools, crafting equipment, and supplies, like yarn and thread. The room serves as the primary meeting space for the Edgar Allan Ohms, the Land O' Lakes High School robotics team sponsored by the library.

=== Ingenuity Lab ===
The Ingenuity Lab is the makerspace at the Hugh Embry Branch Library, and is a STEAM makerspace for several activities such as building robots, learning art, Legos, etc.

=== The Loft ===
The loft is the makerspace at the Centennial Park Branch Library, and includes tools for arts & crafts, painting, sewing, and photography. The makerspace offers classes to teach residents to do crafts and photography, as well a space to work on your own projects, called the open house space.

=== Mobile Makerspace ===
The mobile makerspace is a van that often goes to locations not close to libraries, and offers equipment to do labs. The makerspace includes tools such as a cooktop, woodburning kits, and 3D printers.

=== Regency Fresh ===
Regency Fresh is the makerspace at the Regency Park Branch Library and includes a kitchen that includes spaces for cooking and dining. Additionally, the library is setting up a garden with fruits and vegetables for cooking. Classes are held to learn to use the tools in the kitchen, nutrition, meal planning, and to cook.

=== Studio H ===
Studio H is the makerspace at the Hudson Regional Library that was opened in 2019. It is a multimedia recording studio that provides users with access to equipment, software, and musical instruments.

== Awards ==
=== 2006 ===
- Florida Library of the Year from the Florida Library Association

=== 2008 ===
- Florida Library of the Year from the Florida Library Association.
- Future of the Region Certificate of Excellence and Commemorative program for Public Education in Catastrophe Readiness and Response: Proactive Roles for Public Libraries awarded by Tampa Bay Regional Planning Council.

=== 2010 ===
- John Cotton Dana Award for excellence in public relations
- Florida Library Association's award for best public library website. This prize promotes "awareness of the importance of good design and usability in web page development and to recognize outstanding examples of effective library pages."

=== 2023 ===
- Florida Library of the Year from the Florida Library Association.
