= Tampa Police Department =

Law enforcement agency in Florida, US

Coordinates: 27.948307°N 82.457946°W

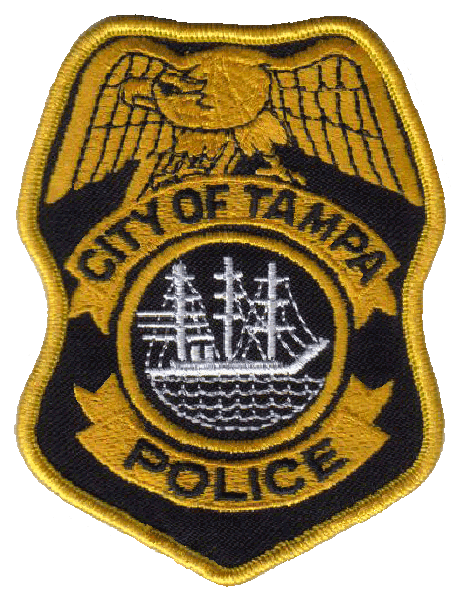
- MASCOTTE
- Common name: Tampa Police Department
- Abbreviation: TPD

Agency overview
- Formed: 1855
- Preceding agencies: Hillsborough County Sheriff
- Employees: 1,206 (2020)
- Annual budget: $163 million (2020)

Jurisdictional structure
- Operations jurisdiction: Florida, United States
- Tampa Police's jurisdiction.
- Population: 392,905 (2018)
- Legal jurisdiction: Tampa, Florida

Operational structure
- Police Officers: ▲1,015 of 1,029 (2023)
- Chief responsible: Lee Bercaw

Website
- www.tampagov.net/police/

The Tampa Police Department (TPD) is the primary law enforcement agency for the city of Tampa, Florida. The Tampa Police Department has 985 authorized sworn law enforcement personnel positions and more than 350 civilian and support staff personnel positions. The acting Chief of Police is Brett Owen.

Uniformed officers are deployed in 3 Districts, on a four-days-on, four-days-off work cycle, with an average of 8 officers per squad plus a Sergeant and Corporal, if fully staffed.

== History ==
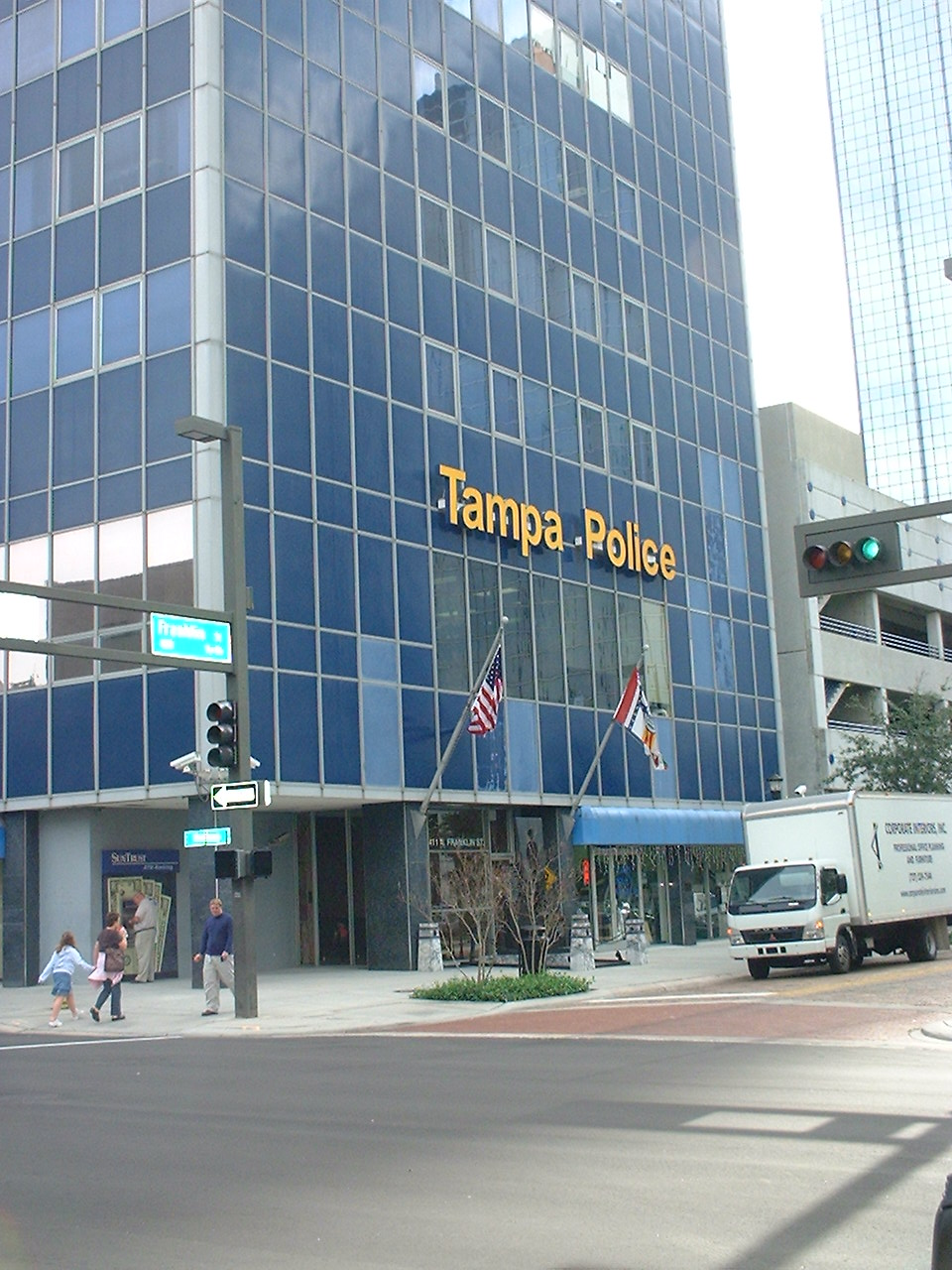
The main headquarters for Tampa Police, at Franklin Street in downtown Tampa.

In 1855 the first official law enforcement position created was City Marshal by an act to incorporate the City of Tampa. Over the next 18 years the City Marshall's duties and responsibilities were expanded to include summoning members of patrol by midnight along with examining and recording marks and brands on butchered cattle.

In 1886, the first police force was created in Tampa by passage of another city ordinance and thus began the Tampa Police Department some fifty-one years after the first police force in America was created. Tampa's first police force was quite small, with a Chief of Police replacing the City Marshall, aided by an Assistant Chief, a Sergeant and three mounted officers. But some key elements of a modern police force were instituted during that time. Standards for officer qualification were established based on merit and physical fitness and officers began wearing uniforms. Two detective positions were also added during this period of time. The following year, on July 15, 1887, the town of Tampa officially incorporated as a city.

Over the next 26 years the Tampa Police Department evolved through a number of reorganizations, adding and subtracting positions, establishing a pension plan for officers and developing rules and regulations dealing with officer's conduct. In 1913 the department created its first Identification Officer position. The officer assigned to the position used the Bertillion System of identification, which preceded the fingerprint method used today in law enforcement. The Bertillion System used a process of measuring body parts such as the nose, eyes and hands along with other characteristics to identify individuals.

The year 1915 was a landmark year as the department relocated to its new headquarters located at Florida Avenue and Jackson Street in Downtown Tampa. That same year Tampa saw the advent of a revolutionary tool in local law enforcement, the automobile. Tampa added an officer to the motored assignment who was both chauffeur and mechanic for the department.

On November 30, 1935, six members of the Modern Democrats, a local Socialist affiliated political party, were arrested by Tampa Police in a warrant-less raid on one of their meetings and taken to the station. None of them were charged with any crime, however, three of them, Joseph Shoemaker, Eugene Poulnot, and Sam Rogers, were kidnapped by masked Klansmen as they left the police station. They were taken to a wooded area near the Tampa suburb of Brandon where they were flogged and burned with hot tar. Shoemaker died nine days later as a result of his injuries. The Hillsborough County Sheriff in cooperation with the state attorney mounted an investigation, eventually concluding that the attack was orchestrated by city employees and the Tampa Police. Five of the seven officers who raided the Modern Democrats meeting, and one other officer, were charged with the murder of Joseph Shoemaker, kidnapping, assault, and the attempted murder of Eugene Poulnot and Sam Rogers. As the investigation continued, evidence surfaced indicating the involvement of the Ku Klux Klan. Shoemaker's brother had received threats from the Klan by phone, and known Klan leaders had been seen at police headquarters shortly before the kidnappings. Three more people, reputed Klansmen, were arrested and charged in the incident, and Tampa Police Chief, R.G. Tittsworth, as well as a police department stenographer, were charged as accessories after the fact. Eleven people, all connected with either Tampa Police Department or the KKK, were charged in connection to the kidnappings and murder.

In 1936, with automotive thefts rising, the department added an Auto Theft Bureau to deal with this relatively new dilemma. Additional functions such as parking meter enforcement were added to the tasks performed by the department along with an expanded role in traffic law enforcement.During the years from 1936 to 1961, the department underwent additional redeployments and Tampa saw its first parking meters in the 1940s.

Major developments in the department's history occurred in 1961. First and foremost was a move to a new police building on Tampa Street at Henderson Avenue. This facility would serve as headquarters until the department moved to its current building in 1997. The first floor of the two-story complex housed police operations while the second floor housed the city's jail and administrative operations. A college training program was instituted that year with participating officers being given special consideration pertaining to work hours and finances. The "platoon" deployment system was adopted giving equal numbers of officers to each platoon, which was rotated between day, evening and midnight shifts. The Police Athletic League was officially organized and one officer was assigned to it full-time to provide special activities for Tampa's youth.

In 1962 the Criminal Intelligence Unit was organized and became responsible for developing and disseminating available information to officers through special files and investigations. The Field Instructor system of training newly appointed police officers was established in 1965. Initially, the Field Instructors were the corporals of the squads. Later they were each squad's top performing and senior officers.

1967 brought a new deployment of manpower with the abolition of the platoon system. A flexible deployment system with 21 squads replaced it. The system deployed officers to areas based on need. The Tampa Police academy received certification as a qualified training institute in 1968 by the State Minimum Standards Training Commission. At that time the academy was held inside the police department's building.

1969 brought another revolutionary advent of law enforcement to the department with the purchase of two Hughes 300 helicopters to complement the two fixed-wing aircraft already in operation. The helicopters' role in supporting officers on the ground during searches was tremendous.

The office of Public Information was created in 1971 to act as a liaison between the department and the news media. Also that year, the first Hazardous Device Technician was trained in handling explosives at the US Army Redstone Arsenal base in Huntsville, Alabama. That technician worked alone until 1973 when several other officers were also trained at Redstone.

In 1972 the prisoner booking function, still conducted in the police headquarters building, was transferred to Hillsborough County Sheriff's Office personnel. Sheriff's Office personnel performed the duty at police headquarters until 1979 when the operation was moved to the county jail on Morgan Street at Scott Street.

During 1974, the department established the Internal Affairs Unit to investigate citizen complaints about officers or employees of the department with impartiality and objectivity.

In September 1975, the department embarked on a new era in community relations and crime prevention by creating the School Resource Officer program. The program placed officers into middle and high school level institutes to handle problems that occur and present preventative programs to the students and faculty. The full-time position of police legal advisor was also created that year. One of the most popular programs among officers was implemented in 1975 as well. The take-home car program allowed officers to drive their units to and from work. The philosophies were to reduce maintenance on the cars, eliminate staggered reporting times, free space being used for lockers and promote safety through higher visibility of units in the neighborhoods the officers lived.

1977 saw the creation of the Tactical Response Team or TRT. The team, known in some cities as SWAT, was designed for response to special threat situations requiring special tactics to reduce the threat to officers, subjects and the community.

The Hostage Negotiation Team was formed in 1979 and combined with the Tactical Response Team. Another innovation of modern law enforcement came to Tampa in 1980. The Neighborhood Watch Program was a result of a more nationwide emphasis being placed on crime prevention through public awareness.

In 1981 the Field Instructor program was replaced with the Field Training and Evaluation Program for officer training. The program was innovative at the time of its inception. Special training squads were created with officers assigned to them receiving additional instruction in methods of training new officers. Recruits, fresh out of the academy, were assigned to these squads and received daily training and evaluation for a period of four months before being attached to regular squads.

The same year the department created the Special Anti-Crime Squad or SAC. The unit would later be called the Street Anti-Crime Squad. The unit's function was to address street level and special crime problems within the city. Special Purpose Vehicles or SPVS were added to the department's cadre of mobility that year also. The vehicles, somewhat similar in design to golf carts, were employed to allow the accessibility of foot patrol to the public but not limit the officer's mobility as foot patrol can. Although the program was initially a trial, it later was adopted and units assigned to the downtown area used them effectively.

In 1982 the department formed its first K-9 unit with five dogs and handlers. Four of the five were trained in search and track while the fifth dog was trained in both narcotic and explosives detection. The police Dive Team was organized that same year in August. They provided the capability for underwater search and recovery to the department on a twenty-four-hour basis.

In 1983 the department conducted an experiment in deployment of personnel. District I used a quad system and District II used a sector system. The object was to provide better supervision, establish clear chains of command and promote the neighborhood policing concept. By 1984, both districts adopted the sector system.

Later in 1983 the department's Communication Section underwent a colossal transformation. The days of calls being handwritten by call takers were over for good at the Tampa Police Department. A new million dollar plus computer aided dispatch system or C.A.D. replaced the old method and drastically improved the way calls were transferred to dispatch and response by street units.

In response to the increased number of street level narcotics dealers in Tampa, a unit was developed to address the problem. The Q.U.A.D. Squads were the answer to the question. Living up to their name, which stands for Quick Uniformed Attack on Drugs, in late 1989 the city was divided up into four quadrants and these four squads set to work defending the streets of Tampa against the onslaught of drug dealers and buyers.

In 1993, the department implemented the Mobile Dispatch System or MDS. The system allowed computers to be placed in police cars for direct dispatch without tying up the radio airwaves. Officers were now capable of running registration and wanted persons checks without communicating to a dispatcher. 1996 saw the creation of a new patrol district with the addition of District III. A new Mounted Unit for horse patrol was created to address the rising need in congestion during special events and the Ybor City entertainment district of Tampa. Another major addition was the Firehouse COP program that placed officers working firehouse areas using community oriented policing philosophies. The officers would respond to neighborhood problems as their primary responsibility and build relationships with the residents to better understand and address their needs.

A major change occurred in 1997 when the Tampa Police Department moved to its new headquarters located at Franklin Street and Madison Street across from city hall. That location also had historical significance in that the original courthouse had stood on the same location. Another development enjoyed by officers was the reinstatement of the take-home car program, which had been abolished nearly ten years earlier.

In 1998 the transition to decentralization took another large step with officers from district II moving into their new station in North Tampa near Busch Gardens. Groundbreaking on the District I station began the same year.

District I occupied its new 15,000-square-foot (1,400 m^{2}) facility in 1999. That year the department's helicopters were equipped with GyroCam camera systems that allowed video downlinking and recording. This new age technology offered more advance surveillance and officer safety capabilities to the department.

The Sexual Predator Identification and Notification program was also instituted in 1999 to comply with the Florida Sexual Predator Act. The program monitors these offenders and tracks them using a sophisticated computer database and is administered by Firehouse officers.

The decentralization of the Tampa Police Department reached its culmination in the year 2000 with the relocation of the communications section to its new state-of-the-art facility in East Tampa.

In February 2004 The department conducted a full re-deployment and divided the city into three districts. Each district was equipped with squads to address street-level narcotics, prostitution and other target crimes.

=== West Tampa Police Department ===
In 1895, West Tampa was an independently incorporated city that operated its own police department. In 1925, West Tampa was annexed by Tampa and the West Tampa Police Department was absorbed by the Tampa Police Department. In 2009, WTPD Patrolman Juan Nales, who was killed in the line of duty in 1920 (five years before West Tampa was annexed), was added to the memorial

== Division/District system ==
=== District One ===
The District One Patrol Division serves Tampa's peninsula, west side, and Davis Islands areas, including Tampa International Mall, Raymond James Stadium, Hyde Park, Courtney Campbell Causeway and Bayshore Boulevard. There are twelve uniformed squads in the district as well as four plainclothed squads.

=== District Two ===
The District Two Patrol Division serves Tampa's northern portion, including Busch Gardens, Sulphur Springs and the Tampa Palms and Hunters Green area frequently referred to as "New Tampa." There are fourteen uniformed squads in the district as well as four plainclothed squads. .

=== District Three ===
The District Three Patrol Division serves East Tampa, the Ybor City area and the Port of Tampa, including Downtown Tampa. There are twelve uniformed squads in the district as well as four plainclothed squads. .

=== District Specialist Units ===
==== District Latent Investigation Squads ====
The District Latent Investigation Squad, detectives, is assigned to each district for latent investigation of crimes against property occurring in the area encompassed by the district. Part of the squad is also charged with conducting latent investigations on assaults.

==== Street Anti-Crime Squads ====
The Street Anti-Crime (SAC) squads assigned to each district are plainclothes units that work in each district to reduce prostitution, Narcotic and other problematic crimes. Their functions include assisting detectives in follow up on latent robbery, burglary and auto theft related crimes.

SAC and ROC changes names every couple of years.

==== Crime Prevention Practitioners ====
A police officer, and a Crime Prevention Practitioner, formerly known as a Community Service Officer are deployed to each district to act in a proactive approach to crime prevention. The team addresses complaints, along with evaluating needs in the communities within each district. They also function as the liaison in each district for the Neighborhood Watch Program. They develop and oversee Neighborhood Watch groups that are partnerships between the community and police department, composed of volunteer citizens, working together to reduce crime.

=== Special Operations Division ===
A division consisting of the Specialty Unit and Specialty Teams (part-time) within the department. Specialty Units include; aviation, traffic, traffic homicide, marine patrol, B.O.A.R. (bike) patrol, special incident management unit (SIMU), canine, and mounted patrol. Specialty Teams include; special weapons and tactics (SWAT) team, explosive ordinance disposal (Bomb Squad), honor guard, hostage negotiation, dive team, and crowd management group.

== Ranks and insignia ==
Title	Insignia
Chief of Police	
Assistant Chief of Police	
Deputy Chief	
Major	
Captain	
Lieutenant	
Sergeant	
Corporal	
Master Police Officer	
Police Officer	No insignia

=== Firearms ===
Officers are currently issued the SIG Sauer P320 in 9mm which replaced the Smith & Wesson M&P .40 S&W pistols which were chambered for back in 2018. The Smith & Wesson M&P40 pistols replaced Glock 17 9mm pistols back in 2009. TPD officers also have a small supply of AR-15 5.56×45mm rifles while on duty in case a situation requires more firepower than a sidearm. Others available are from Colt, Hi-Point and Ruger.

Tampa Police SWAT officers carry the SIG Sauer P226 9mm as their sidearm however following the department's switch to the P320 it is also being considered to replace the P226 pistols used.

== City marshal ==
M. L. Shanahan (1859)

=== Chief of Police ===
- James G. Littleton (1967–1974)
- Charles Otero (1974–1979)
- Clayton Briggs (1979–1981)
- Robert Smith (1981–1985)
- Don Newburger (1985–1987)
- A.C. McLane (1987–1992)
- Eduardo Gonzalez (1992–1993)
- Bennie Holder (1993–2003)
- Stephen Hogue (2003–2009)
- Jane Castor (2009–2015)
- Eric Ward (2015–2017)
- Brian Dugan (2017–2021)
- Mary O'Connor (2022)
- Lee Bercaw (2022–2026)

== Line of Duty Deaths ==
Since 1895, there have been 32 LODDs. The most recent being Master Police Officer Jesse Madsen.

== Demographics ==
Over the years, the demographics of full-time sworn personnel were:

Year	Percentage of full-time sworn personnel							
Year	Female	Male	African American or Black	American Indian	Asian/Pacific Islander	Hispanic, any race	White, non-Hispanic	Other race
1993	16	84	12.4	0.3	0.4	11.3	75.6	—N/a
1997	16	84	12	1	1	13	73	—N/a
2000	15	85	12	1	1	13	73	0

== Controversies ==
In February 2022, Mayor Jane Castor named Mary O'Connor as Chief of Police. O'Connor's nomination was controversial from the start. Critics of the nomination pointed to O'Connor's past felony arrest for battery on a law enforcement officer. The Tampa Bay Times Editorial board described the process: "selecting Tampa's next police chief is feeling more like a politically-themed episode of Keystone Kops."

In a Tampa Bay Times article entitled, "In picking Tampa's police chief, mayor has much to weigh" a former police chief and current professor at John Jay College of Criminal Justice said "[choosing O'Connor] could send the wrong message to officers and would-be officers at a time when the public is calling for police accountability." Mayor Castor picked O'Connor anyway.

Members of the Tampa City Council opposed O'Connor's nomination before she was ultimately confirmed as Chief of Police. In less than a year, those who opposed O'Connor would be vindicated when news broke of an embarrassing police video where O'Connor attempted to use her position as Tampa Police Chief to get out of a traffic violation. The incident would make national news and lead to O'Connor's resignation.

The Mary O'Connor debacle was reported in local media as part of a year for the Tampa Police Department that contained "scandal after scandal." In an article entitled "Tampa Police Department’s worst moments of 2022" reporters documented a year where Tampa Police officers were discovered to have shot a dog and made jokes about it, used "geofencing" to investigate crimes- a tactic that some critics say is unconstitutional, and the department's “crime-free multi housing” program was under federal investigation.

In 2020, the Innocence Project gained the release of Robert DuBoise, an innocent man wrongfully convicted and put on Florida's death row due to the mishandling and improper processing of crime scene evidence, among other officer misconduct, by the Tampa Police Department. The Super Bowl Champion Tampa Bay Buccaneers highlighted Robert DuBoise's story and exoneration. DuBoise filed a Federal Civil Rights lawsuit against the City of Tampa and Tampa Police officers for fabricating evidence that led to his wrongful conviction and death sentence. On June 9, 2023, Florida Governor Ron DeSantis approved a bill awarding Robert DuBoise $1.85 million for his wrongful 37-year incarceration, the award translated to $50,000 for every year DuBoise was in prison.

== See also ==
- List of law enforcement agencies in Florida
- Hillsborough County Sheriff's Office
