= New Tampa Regional Library =

Public library in Tampa, Florida

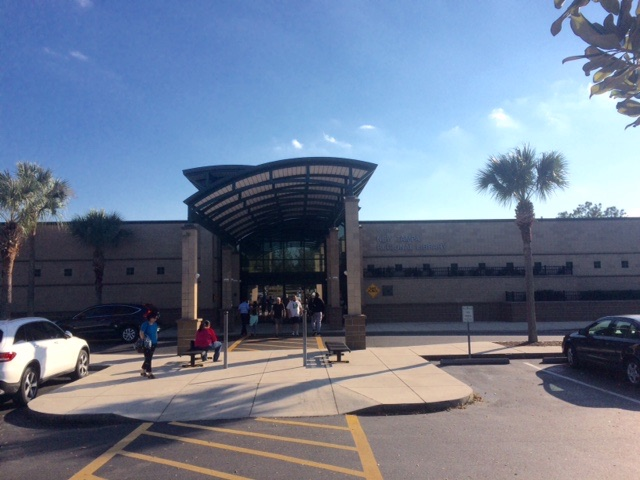

General information
- Location: Tampa, Florida, 10001 Cross Creek Blvd., United States
- Coordinates: 28°08′28″N 82°19′41″W,
- Opened: 1997

Website
- http://www.hcplc.org/hcplc/locations/ntr/

The New Tampa Regional Library is a 25,000 square foot public library located in the Hunter's Green area in north central Hillsborough County, Florida. It is a single-story building and the 19th facility in the Tampa-Hillsborough County Public Library System. New Tampa Regional Library is located directly between Hunter's Green Elementary School and Benito Middle School.

== History ==
The New Tampa Regional Library was dedicated on May 4, 1997. It was built in response to growing population in the area that had put strain on the smaller nearby Thonotosassa and Lutz branches of the Tampa-Hillsborough County Library System and serves the communities of Pebble Creek, Tampa Palms, and New Tampa. With a budget of $4.4 million, the New Tampa Regional Library was designed by Harvard Jolly Clees Toppe Architects, funded by a .10-mill property tax levy, and built on 3.6 acres donated by Markborough Florida Inc. It opened with 100,000 volumes, five meeting rooms, and two hundred parking spaces.

== Services ==
In addition to books, DVDs, and audio CDs, the New Tampa Regional Library also offers meeting rooms, a large community room, public use internet computers, access to electronic databases and eBooks, an all-ages maker space called "The Hive," literacy tutors, and a used book store. As with all libraries in the Tampa-Hillsborough County Public Library system, the New Tampa Regional Library also offers printers, photocopiers, scanners, public fax service, free wi-fi, and assistive technology. In 2017, New Tampa Regional Library improved their circulation area and renovated their children's area to better serve their patrons. The Neighborhood News December 11, 2017 announced the construction of the current glass wall enclosing the children's area, which was designed to provide a safe learning environment where, according to principal librarian Wendy Prasad, kids can "be kids a little more." The announcement also indicated that the enclosed children's area would bring in “Grandma Claire’s Early Learning Hive”—a dedicated kid's early learning hive promoting a STEAM (Science, Technology, Engineering, Art, and Math) concept for early literacy utilizing LEGOs, word matching, letters, sensory toys and manipulatives. The Neighborhood News announcement also noted that the kid's early learning hive would be named for New Tampa resident Claire Unnasch who gave a $25,000 donation to enrich the children's area before her death in 2016. In 2019 the library became one of four branches that accepts U.S. Passport applications. Customers may make an appointment by calling the library. Links to the U.S. Department of State and pertinent information regarding applications can be found on the HCPLC website.

== Friends of the Library ==
The Friends of the New Tampa Regional Library worked hard to get community support in order to build the library. Jeri Zelinski, a retired librarian who moved to New Tampa in 1990, was the founding president of the friends group and was an advocate who led petition drives and worked with developers to donate the land for the library. Following her death in 2002, on September 25, 2004, the Jeri Zelinski Community Room was posthumously dedicated in honor of her efforts in bringing a library to the New Tampa area. According to a Tampa Bay Online report from September 19, 2008, further efforts had been underway to honor Jeri Zelinski through an unprecedented campaign to rename the library after her, but these efforts were complicated by the New Tampa Community Council's previous desire to honor Carol Poland, a civically active New Tampa resident who dedicated herself to improving Hunter's Green through many community and volunteer initiatives.

Currently, the Friends of the New Tampa Regional Library provide support for the library through the Friends-operated bookstore known as the Book Nook. Proceeds from book sales are used to fund programs for children, teens and adults and to support other library activities.

== Public Art ==
The library contains several pieces of art provided through Hillsborough County's Public Art Program. The exterior of the library has a ceramic tile ribbon walkway, Alphawalk, by Claire Jeanine Satin. In 2014, the library began to display The Key Tree by Rob Woods on its back patio. This piece is a 14-branch tree that has 1880 leaves made from keys collected by students from Tampa Palms Elementary School. Other rotating artwork within the library includes Spirit Ladder by Celeste Simon, From the Shadows and Cascading by Martha Brooks Marshall, Gift Bearers by John Whipple, and Trojan Battle Plan by George Pappas.
