= 2026 Tampa Citibank shooting =

Shooting in Florida, US

- CCTV still of Pearson moments before being shot
- Location: 27.9776600°N 82.3320029°W; Citibank Center; East Lake-Orient Park, Florida, US
- Date: November 4, 2026
- Target: Citibank employees
- Attack type: Shooting; vehicle-ramming attack
- Weapons: Rifle; Handgun
- Deaths: 2 (including the perpetrator)
- Injuries: 3 (non-gunshot injuries)
- Perpetrator: Jacob Pearson
- Defender: John Fraley
- Motive: Revenge after a lawyer refused to cancel a court hearing over Pearson's unpaid $2,556.40 credit card debt

On November 4, 2026, 35-year-old Jacob Pearson drove his car onto the campus of Citibank Center in East Lake-Orient Park, Florida, United States, near Tampa. After exiting the vehicle, Pearson fatally shot a female employee of the company before entering a cafeteria on campus where he was shot and killed by John Fraley, a security officer for Citibank.

== Background ==
The Citibank Center has four three-story office buildings, which collectively house thousands of Citibank employees. At the time of the attack, around 3,200 people were on the campus. Citibank employees were targeted by the gunman due to a lawyer refusing to cancel a court hearing for the gunman's unpaid credit card debt. According to an attorney specializing in consumer credit card debt, banks in Florida usually give a six month grace period before filing a lawsuit against someone for defaulting on repayment.

== Shooting ==
Police body camera footage of response to the attack

About three hours before the attack, Pearson phoned an attorney affiliated with Citibank, demanding that the lawyer cancel a court hearing about Pearson's unpaid credit card debt. In the call, Pearson threatened to "go over there with my AR-15, my bulletproof vest and my insanity" if the court hearing was not canceled.

The attorney reported Pearson's threat, prompting Citibank's security team and local law enforcement to be on the lookout for Pearson. Police officers went to Pearson's home in Orlando, but his wife told them that Pearson had already left and that he appeared angry, but she did not know where he was going. Hillsborough County deputies had just arrived on the campus of Citibank Center when Pearson began the attack.

Pearson drove his car into the courtyard of Citibank Center into outdoor tables where employees were eating lunch. Pearson then opened fire with a rifle and a handgun, killing 41-year-old Leanne Selman. Pearson initially shot Selman three times with the rifle, but after it malfunctioned, he retrieved a handgun from his car as she attempted to crawl away and fatally shot her. Pearson then entered a cafeteria at Citibank Center, where less than a minute later, he was shot in a hallway by security officer John Fraley, who had positioned himself inside a men's bathroom. After Pearson was initially shot, he fell to the ground and returned fire. In total, Fraley shot Pearson five times. Pearson was later transported to Tampa General Hospital, where he died.

== Victims ==
The sole shooting victim of the attack was 41-year-old Leanne Selman, a resident of Palm Harbor, worked in the human resources department as a learning advisor for Citi security investigative services. Selman had worked for the company for nine years. Three other people were injured during the evacuation, and a fourth, a pregnant woman, was hospitalized as a precaution.

== Defender ==
John Fraley, aged 38, is a Citibank security officer and a vice president of operations. Fraley had previously served in the Marine Corps. According to Hillsborough County sheriff Chad Chronister, Fraley had stopped Pearson from "hunt[ing] any human being he could find and kill".

== Perpetrator ==
Jacob Pearson, a 35-year-old man from Orlando, was identified by the Hillsborough County Sheriff's Office as the perpetrator. At the time of his death, he was married and had a 7-year-old child. Pearson's father told the Associated Press that he had not seen any indication that his son was capable of such violence, but that he had last spoken to him over the phone several weeks prior and they had not spoken about his son's financial situation.

Pearson attended Leon High School. in October 2008, aged 17, he was arrested having threatened to kill the principal and some of his classmates.

Court records from Orange County, in which Orlando is located, showed that Citibank filed a complaint against Pearson on October 23 for $2,556.40. The bill for that amount was dated back to July 4. The court issued a summons for Pearson to appear for a hearing about his debt on February 15, 2027. Hillsborough County sheriff Chad Chronister said that Pearson intended to target Citibank employees.

== Aftermath ==
Several employees from Citibank Center ran to the neighboring Sheraton Tampa Brandon Hotel to flee the attack. The hotel provided them with water, lunch, and allowed them to enter hotel rooms in order to "decompress or make phone calls". A reunification center was later set up in the parking lot of the hotel. A spokesperson for Citigroup said that employees were being allowed to work remotely after the attack, and that resources, such as mental health support, and opportunities to speak with Citigroup leadership were being made available to employees.

== Reactions ==
Hillsborough County sheriff Chad Chronister said that Pearson "took one life, and that’s one life too many", and that Fraley was a "hero" for confronting Pearson. A Citigroup spokesperson said that the company's focus after the attack was to focus on how it could "support the family of our fallen colleague".

The dancing group that shooting victim Leanne Selman was a member of honored her with a special performance on November 7.

== See also ==
- 2026 Bakersfield hostage crisis – a hostage crisis situation at a Chase Bank earlier in the year
- 2019 Sebring shooting – a mass shooting in Florida targeting a SunTrust bank
