= Westchase =

Westchase may refer to the following places in the United States:

- Westchase, Florida
- Westchase, Houston, Texas
