= Hillsborough County Sheriff's Office =

County agency of Hillsborough County, Florida

Coordinates: 27.961695°N 82.436137°W

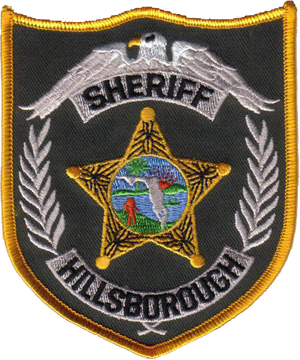

- Flag of Hillsborough County, Florida
- Motto: To Serve and Protect

Agency overview
- Formed: 1845
- Employees: 3,397

Jurisdictional structure
- Operations jurisdiction: Hillsborough, Florida, USA
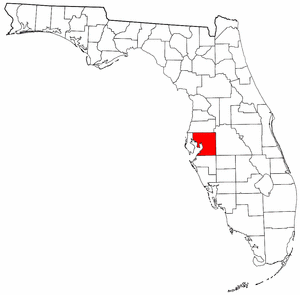
- Map of Hillsborough County Sheriff's Office's jurisdiction
- Area: 888 square miles (2,300 km^{2})
- Population: 1,157,738
- General nature: Local civilian police

Operational structure
- Headquarters: Tampa, Florida
- Deputy Sheriffs and Corrections: 2,067 (L.E. and Detention)
- Civilians: 1,375
- Agency executive: Chad Chronister (R), Sheriff
- Patrol Districts: 5

Facilities
- Jails: 2
- Police Boats: 5
- Helicopters: 5
- Planes: 1

Website
- www.teamhcso.com

Hillsborough County Sheriff's Office (HCSO) is the primary law enforcement agency for Hillsborough County, Florida, and is responsible for law enforcement services for the 888 square miles (2,300 km^{2}) of unincorporated areas of the county as well as operation of the two jail facilities and provides courthouse security for the 13th Judicial Circuit. Each of the three incorporated cities (Tampa, Plant City, and Temple Terrace) has its own police agency. Tampa International Airport and the University of South Florida also have independent police agencies.

The sheriff is the chief law enforcement officer of the county. The current sheriff is Chad Chronister. Sheriff Chronister was appointed by Florida governor Rick Scott on September 30, 2017, to fill the position after the retirement of David Gee.

The office has one of the lowest officer-to-citizen ratios in the state with 1.4 deputies per 1000 citizens. The national average is 2.3 per 1000. The population of Hillsborough County in 2006 was 1,157,738.

== History ==
The HCSO was formed in 1845.

In 1986, the Commission on Accreditation for Law Enforcement Agencies (CALEA) accredited the Hillsborough County Sheriff's Office. The Hillsborough County Sheriff's Office was the first sheriff's office in Florida to be nationally accredited and the 1st in the nation to be re-accredited.

== Uniforms ==
Deputies wear dark green trousers with a black stripe on the sides. The shirt is a white poly-cotton button-down with chest pockets, epaulettes, and shoulder patches. Deputies wear silver 5-point star badges. Officers above the rank of corporal wear gold badges. A black tie is worn with the dress uniform (long sleeves) and the command staff wear black dress jackets. Black shoes or boots are also worn with the uniform. Hats are typically not worn by deputies but they are plain black straw cowboy type.

== Deputies ==
Law enforcement deputies must be at least 21 years old and have an associate degree; a combination of high school diploma/ GED and 3 years active duty military; or high school diploma/ GED and 3 years of continuous full-time employment with the same employer. Law enforcement deputies are responsible for responding to calls for service and enforcing laws.

Detention deputies must be 19 years old and have possession of a high school diploma or a GED Certificate. They are responsible for the supervision of inmates in the county jails. They also transport inmates to and from court, prison and other counties. Detention deputies are also in charge of protection of the county courthouse and its judges.

Starting salary for a deputy trainee is $68,910.40. Starting salary for a certified law enforcement officer or detention deputy is $72,355.92.

== Demographics ==
The Hillsborough County Sheriff's Office has approximately 2,067 deputies. Law Enforcement is made up of approximately 1,254 deputies, and Detention is made up of approximately 813 deputies.

As of 2020, law enforcement was 71.4% white, 8.5% black, 15.6% Hispanic, 1.4% Asian, 0.9% native and 2.3% other. Detention was 56.3% white, 18.9% black, 21.6% Hispanic, 1.7% Asian, 0.5% native and 0.9% other.

Overall racial demographics in 2020 for all deputies was 65.5% white, 12.6% black, 17.9% Hispanic, 1.5% Asian, 0.7% native and 1.7% other.

Law Enforcement has 207 females, and detention has 150 females.

== Rank structure ==
Title	Insignia
Sheriff	
Undersheriff	
Chief Deputy	
Colonel	
Major	
Captain	
Lieutenant	
Sergeant	
Corporal	
Detective Corporal	
Deputy	

== Patrol Services ==
The Department of Patrol Services consists of five district offices serving different geographical areas of unincorporated Hillsborough County. Patrol services are overseen by a Colonel. Each District is commanded by a Major. Patrol squads consist of a Sergeant, Corporal and Deputies. Two squads patrol each district and are overseen by a Lieutenant.

Each district is assigned traffic enforcement squads, detectives, and street level crimes squads. In 2018, the Sheriff's Office implemented a DUI squad which operate on a county wide level.

District I is responsible for northern Hillsborough, District II eastern, District III western, District IV southern and District V central. Patrols service the following unincorporated census-designated places.

District I North	District II East	District III West	District IV South	District V Central
Cheval Lutz Greater Northdale Lake Magdalene Pebble Creek University Uptown	Del Rio East Lake Seffner Thonotosassa Mango Dover Valrico	Carrollwood Egypt Lake-Leto Citrus Park Town 'n' Country West Chase Keystone	Apollo Beach Gibsonton Fish Hawk Lithia Wimauma Sun City Center Ruskin	Palm River-Clair Mel Progress Village Orient Park Brandon Riverview

== Reserve II Program ==
The Reserve II Deputy Program is a uniformed Sheriff's Office support organization open to all persons age 21 and older, on an equal-opportunity basis. Reserve II deputies work with regular deputies in various assignments. The Hillsborough County Sheriff's Office takes great pride in the reserve II deputies civic spirit and willingness to serve.

The Reserve Program currently consists of over 110 volunteers. Each reserve II deputy must serve a minimum of 20 volunteer hours each month on assigned duties.

== Communications Bureau ==
The Hillsborough County Sheriff's Office Communications Bureau is the first point-of-contact for citizens living in unincorporated areas of the county that are seeking emergency or law enforcement services. This is one of the busiest Public Safety Answering Points (9-1-1) in the Tampa Bay area. In a typical year, the Bureau staff answers approximately 1.6 million telephone calls from the public and other agencies, of which approximately 540,000 are received via 911. The Communications Bureau entered approximately 750,000 calls into the CAD system.. The Communications Bureau is the largest component of non-law enforcement officers in the Sheriff's Office; it is composed of over 140 personnel, who work 24 hours a day, 365 days a year.

In July 2004, the 10,000-square-foot (930 m^{2}) facility was completely remodeled with state-of-the-art ergonomic workstations and new computers with flat panel LCD monitors. A new Versaterm/Versadex Computer Aided Dispatch (CAD) and Records Management System (RMS) was installed in February 2005. This new systems have significantly expanded the capabilities of both the dispatcher and patrol deputy by allowing them to rapidly share information, efficiently coordinate resources using full-color dynamic displays, and improve officer safety. In addition to the new CAD system, the Bureau utilizes the Plant Vesta E9-1-1 (enhanced 9-1-1) phone system. The E9-1-1 system automatically displays a map that shows the location of each call.

== Detention services ==
The Department of Detention Services is composed of two major facilities and a work release center.

=== Orient Road Jail ===
The Orient Road Jail has three command areas within the 636,000-square-foot (59,100 m^{2}) facility with a rated capacity of 1,711. North and South Commands are under the direction of one Lieutenant and consists of primarily six housing units. Each direct supervision housing unit contains four pods that are designed to house 72 inmates. Another Lieutenant oversees Central Command, which is the receiving area for new admissions and includes Intake Housing and the Central Breath Testing Unit. The Orient Road Jail processes all arrested individuals in Hillsborough County regardless of the arresting agency. Approximately 74,000 people per year are processed through the booking section. Each inmate completes property intake, medical screening, fingerprinting, photographing, and classification interview during the booking process.

=== Falkenburg Road Jail ===
The Falkenburg Road Jail opened in 1998 with 768 beds. An expansion of the facility in 2003 added 1,536 more beds to its present rated capacity of 2,304. Falkenburg's dormitories are constructed of pre-cast concrete tilt-up walls. Deputies manage 72 inmates in a direct supervision environment. The daily operational cost is $74.04 per inmate. The Falkenburg Road Jail uses video court and video visitation. Prisoners and visitors are not permitted to talk directly to each other.

=== Work Release Center ===
Directly across from the Orient Road Jail, the Work Release Center houses reduced-custody inmates. These inmates may either work at an outside job every day, returning to the facility at the end of the day or they can work as a trustee in various areas of the Sheriff's Office. Trustee labor includes maintaining the facility grounds, food preparation, washing county cars, and sanitation. In 2006, the county saved an estimated $13 million by using trustee labor. The House Arrest Program is for individuals who are court ordered to remain in their homes during non-working hours. They wear an electronic anklet and are subject to random visits by the house arrest deputy. These individuals must meet strict guidelines and undergo extensive background checks before being placed into the program. Day Reporting is a program usually dealing with people who have been sentences for minor offenses. This program requires the individual to check in each day with a community service officer allowing better tracking and ensuring that these individuals appear for scheduled court dates.

== School security ==
HCSO deputies provide security at Hillsborough County Public Schools. In accordance with Florida law, at least one deputy is stationed at every public middle and high school in Hillsborough County. These deputies are known as school resource officers (SRO's) and work to become familiar with the students at their school.

== 1967 riots ==
In 1967 a black burglary suspect was shot and killed by a white policeman. Long simmering rage ignited the city that was fueled by other problems. Within hours, storefronts were ablaze, and teenagers pelted police cruisers with rocks and bottles. Snipers held police and firefighters at bay. Fearing the violence would turn into another riot situation similar to that of Watts, California, Sheriff Beard asked Governor Claude Kirk to call out the National Guard. The guardsmen exchanged gunfire with rioters but never attacked. Beard was convinced by black leaders to allow groups of their own to quell the rioters, and within two days, Beard declared the riots were over.

== Misconduct ==
In 2006, sheriff's deputies, along with other law enforcement agencies arrested 52 members of the Caribbean American Club on racketeering charges. Two years later, the court threw out 23 of the cases on the grounds of entrapment. In 2013, the department agreed to pay $260,000 to ten of those arrested as compensation.

In 2007, Deputy Roosevelt Givens began a sexual relationship with a 13-year-old girl. In 2012 the deputy was allowed to resign. The victim refused to cooperate with the investigation making prosecution difficult.

On 29 January 2008 Quadriplegic Brian Sterner was dumped from his wheelchair as he was being booked for an alleged traffic violation at the Hillsborough County, Florida Sheriff's Office jail facility. Surveillance video showed Sterner tumbling to the floor and officers searching his clothing as he lay prone. The video raised concerns about police treatment of the disabled after being widely circulated on news channels and YouTube. The deputy later resigned and was charged with felony abuse on a disabled person after the video was publicized. Charges were dropped when she agreed to a plea deal which she agrees to never work in law enforcement again and does 100 hours of community service with the disabled. Several other deputies were suspended without pay and one supervisor was fired for not reporting the incident.

On 11 September 2008, a mentally ill man was hog-tied by three sheriff's deputies and subjected to a number of electrical shocks. The local medical examiner said that Roney Wilson died as a result of "delirium with agitation due to schizoaffective disorder." The death was the subject of a civil lawsuit.

In 2008, sheriff's deputies and officers from the Temple Terrace Police Department lied on official documents regarding a routine arrest for driving under the influence. Deputy James Glover falsely attested the correct procedures had been followed. When the defense attorney asked for the video of the incident, he discovered the tapes had been altered by officials.

== Sheriffs ==
1. 1845-1847 John Parker
2. 1847-1849 John I. Hooker
3. 1850-1854 B.J. Hagler
4. 1854-1855 E.T. Kendrick
5. 1855-1857 Henry Parker
6. 1857-1858 Dr. William A. Lively
7. 1858-1865 William S. Spencer
8. 1865-1867 John T. Lesley
9. 1874-1875 I.R. Hay
10. 1877-1885 D. Isaac Craft
11. 1885-1893 James P. Martin
12. 1893-1901 Thomas K. Spencer
13. 1901-1905 Robert Woodburn
14. 1912-1913 Robert Jackson
15. 1913-1917 William C. Spencer
16. 1917-1921 Alonzo J. White
17. 1921-1925 William C. Spencer
18. 1925-1929 Luther M. Hiers
19. 1929-1929 Luther Hatton
20. 1929-1933 R.T. Joughin
21. 1933-1935 William C. Spencer
22. 1935-1941 Jerry McLeod
23. 1941-1952 Hugh Culbreath
24. 1952-1953 Elbert Moore
25. 1953-1965 Ed Blackburn
26. 1965-1978 Malcolm Beard
27. 1978-1992 Walter C. Heinrich
28. 1992-2004 Cal Henderson
29. 2004–2017 David Gee
30. 2017–Present Chad Chronister

== Line of duty deaths ==
17 Hillsborough County Sheriff's Office deputies died while they were actively employed by the sheriff's office. Here is a list of those deputies.

Name	Date	Cause of death	Years of service
Deputy Richard Roach	1874	Gunfire	
Deputy William E. Whitehurst	July 4, 1893	Gunfire	
Deputy Ed Aulick	January 24, 1932	Gunfire	
Deputy Robert Max Suarez	September 3, 1944	Gunfire	
Sergeant Ben P. Wilder Jr.	July 22, 1962	Gunfire	8 years
Sergeant Donald C. Williams	June 12, 1967	Heart attack	6 years
Sergeant James Strachinsky	September 4, 1969	Heart attack	13 years
Aux. Sgt. Lee A. Hutchinson	July 25, 1970	Automobile accident	4 years
Deputy James A. Allen	May 21, 1974	Heart attack	9 years
Corporal Lemon Harvey	December 15, 1981	Gunfire	8 years
Deputy Frederick T. Clark	May 7, 1987	Automobile accident	7 years
Deputy Donna M. Miller	May 8, 1987	Automobile accident	8 years
Deputy David A. Abella	April 21, 2004	Automobile accident	10 months
Sergeant Ronald Harrison	August 15, 2007	Gunfire	29 years : 27 with HCSO
Deputy Mark Longway	September 21, 2010	Automobile accident	6 years
Deputy John Robert Kotfila	March 12, 2016	Automobile accident - Wrong way driver	6 years
Sergeant Brian LaVigne (posthumously promoted)	January 11, 2021	Automobile incident - Fleeing suspect rammed patrol car	30 years

== See also ==
- County sheriff (Florida)
- List of United States state and local law enforcement agencies
