= New Tampa =

- Region
- Location within the state of Florida
- Coordinates: 28°7′20″N 82°22′28″W
- Country: United States
- State: Florida
- County: Hillsborough
- City: Tampa

Area
  - Total: 24 sq mi (62 km^{2})

Population (2000)
  - Total: 22,466
  - Density: 940/sq mi (360/km^{2})
- Time zone: UTC-5 (Eastern (EST))
  - Summer (DST): UTC-4 (EDT)
- ZIP codes: 33544, 33646 and 33647
- Area code: 813

New Tampa is a region in Florida that encompasses both a 24-square-mile (62 km^{2}) area within the corporate limits of the City of Tampa, as well as a larger land area that is in unincorporated Hillsborough, but retains a Tampa mailing address. The incorporated portion of "New Tampa" that lies within the city limits of Tampa is one of the largest city neighborhoods. The population has grown rapidly since being annexed by the city of Tampa in 1988. As of the 2000 census, the district had a population of 22,466. Many new master planned residential communities are planned or already under construction. Big-box stores are following the boom in population and are transforming this once rural area.

"New Tampa" may also refer to a larger area that includes the area described above as well as parts of Wesley Chapel, an unincorporated area that abuts Hillsborough County to the north. Although neither technically nor officially part of the Tampa designated neighborhood New Tampa, most Tampa area residents identify the entire area as New Tampa.

== Description ==
New Tampa is bounded by Lutz to the west, Wesley Chapel to the north, Morris Bridge Road (near Thonotosassa) to the east, and the University community and the University of South Florida to the south.

== Demographics ==
As of the census of 2000, there were 22,466 residing in the district. 14,891 families, and 15,447 households. The population density was 936/mi^{2}. There were 11,143 housing units at an average density of 464.3/mi^{2}. The racial makeup of the district was 64% White, 21% Hispanic or Latino of any race, 15% Black, 11% Asian, less than 0.01% Native American, less than 0.01% Pacific Islander, 8% from some other race.

NOTE: The demographic numbers exclude Pebble Creek, which is in unincorporated Hillsborough County.

== Population growth ==
New Tampa has seen extraordinary growth in the past few years. The population rose from 7,145 residents in 1990 to 26,634 in 2000, an increase of 19,489 or 272.7%. The population was estimated at 37,350 in 2005. New Tampa is accounting for 52% of Tampa's citywide growth and is expected to continue. Housing units increased by 850 between 2004 and 2005 to a total of 15,340. Many new subdivisions are being built which is causing the large amount of growth in the area.

== History ==
Although first settled in the mid-19th century, New Tampa remained undeveloped until the late-1980s, when the city of Tampa annexed the 24-square-mile (62 km^{2}) area. Its oldest neighborhood being Pebble Creek with its oldest area residing within the Tampa city limits being Tampa Palms. Although originally developed when the area was still unincorporated, it did not thrive until the district boom of the 1990s. Most of the city's growth in the 1990s occurred in this district.

== Development ==
The explosive growth of New Tampa, in both residential and commercial properties, has given rise to a great deal of confusion regarding the boundaries of New Tampa. For example, the annual "Taste of New Tampa" culinary event was held in Wesley Chapel, Pasco County, not because Wesley Chapel is a part of the New Tampa community, but due to the failure to find an acceptable location in New Tampa proper. The result is that New Tampa and Wesley Chapel are separate communities.

Another "growing pain" for New Tampa is the amount of infrastructure improvements being made to accommodate the area's rapid growth. Numerous residential developments, including high density housing (condominia, townhouses, etc.), continue to dot the landscape. Several retail outlets in the area have been completed (Shops at Wiregrass in nearby Wesley Chapel) or are under construction (Cypress Creek Town Center, near Wesley Chapel and Lutz). Roadways such as Bruce B. Downs Boulevard continue to deal with vehicle traffic well above the numbers the roadways were built to support, making for slower traffic movement in the area. Citizens groups continue to petition elected officials of both city and county offices for relief from these problems. Many major roadway improvements have recently begun and/or been completed. These include the widening of Cross Creek Blvd., the construction of the I-75 flyover ramp from the westbound traffic lane of Bruce B. Downs Blvd to the southbound lane of I-75. Roadway projects also in future city planning are the widening of Bruce B Downs Blvd from Bearss Ave. east to the County Line Rd. intersection and the construction of the highly debated East-West road to connect New Tampa Blvd. directly to I-275 south (to be located north of Livingston Ave Bridge and the Bearss Ave Exit).

== Culture and Recreation ==
Flatwoods Conservation Park

This county-managed park is part of the Lower Hillsborough Wilderness Preserve (LHWP) and is accessible by the Bruce B. Downs Boulevard or Morris Bridge Road entrance. It is home to the Morris Bridge Well-Field which supplies the Tampa Bay region with an average of 8 million gallons of water per day. This woodland area also has a paved bicycle loop, off-road bike trails, remote picnicking, and nature trails.

New Tampa Center

Located in New Tampa Community Park, the recreation center has a 12,500 square-foot gymnastics area, which includes a gymnastics pit, tumbling strip, and full apparatus gymnastic equipment for all competitive Olympic events. The center offers both gymnastic and dance classes. In addition to the gymnastics area, the center features a concrete bi-level street skate park with pyramids, stairs, wedges and grind rails, and a series of quarter-pipe turns.

New Tampa Nature Park

This park is managed by the City of Tampa Parks and Recreation Department and is located off of Dona Michelle Drive near Interstate 75. The wooded park features paved and unpaved trails for hiking and biking. There are picnic areas and a playground featuring a small ropes course.

New Tampa Regional Library

Located on Cross Creek Boulevard, this 25,000 square foot library offers a variety of free programs for New Tampa residents and the surrounding community including technology instruction and early literacy classes. The library is also home to numerous works of art via Hillsborough County’s Public Art Program.

== Major roads and highways ==
- Bruce B. Downs Boulevard
- Cross Creek Boulevard
- Interstate 75
- Interstate 275
- New Tampa Boulevard

== ZIP Code ==
- ZIP code for the area is 33647

== See also ==
- Neighborhoods in Tampa, Florida
- Tampa Palms
- Wesley Chapel, similar area in Pasco County, borders New Tampa at County Line Rd.
- Westchase
