= Tampa Premium Outlets =

Shopping center in Pasco County, Florida, U.S.

- Location: Lutz, Florida, U.S.
- Coordinates: 28°11′20″N 82°23′42″W
- Address: 2300 Grand Cypress Dr
- Opened: October 29, 2015; 11 years ago
- Developer: Simon Property Group; Richard E. Jacobs Group
- Manager: Simon Premium Outlets
- Owner: Simon Property Group
- Architect: The Collaborative Inc
- Num. of stores: 110+ (at peak)
- Num. of anchor tenants: 1 (vacant since April 2026)
- Public transit: GOPASCO Bus Route 54
- Website: www.premiumoutlets.com/outlet/tampa

Tampa Premium Outlets is a regional outlet mall located off of Interstate 75 in Wesley Chapel, Florida. The mall is owned by Simon Property Group, and features shops such as including Calvin Klein, Adidas, and Nike.

== History ==
=== 2014–2015: Development and opening ===
On May 9, 2014, a 56-acre (23 ha) site on the south side of Florida State Road 56 was selected by Simon Property Group and the Richard E. Jacobs Group (operating as JG Cypress Creek, LLC). The project would be developed in phases, and would be part of the broader Cypress Creek Town Center development.

The land for the mall was bought on October 3, 2014, by Tampa Premium Outlets LLC, a local subsidiary of Simon Property Group, for $14.1 million. Simon hired the Toledo, Ohio-based architectural firm The Collaborative to design the mall. Tampa Premium Outlets opened on October 29, 2015, with the anchor store for the shopping mall being Saks Off 5th. At the opening, there was 103 stores.

=== 2020–present: After opening ===
On March 19, 2020, Simon Property Group closed Tampa Premium Outlets as a result of the COVID-19 pandemic. While the mall was expected to reopen on March 29, 2020, it did not do so until May 4, 2020.

In September 2023, Tampa Premium Outlets added five stores; Lacoste, Cabi, Zwilling J. A. Henckels, Golf Apparel Shop, and Tacos El Patron. In December 2024, plans were submitted to Pasco County for the construction of The Cheesecake Factory. In April 2025, Ulta Beauty was announced to open a location at Tampa Premium Outlets.

The Cheesecake Factory had its grand opening on November 11, 2025. In January 2026, Saks Off 5th announced that it would close permanently in March, as its parent company, Saks Global, filed for Chapter 11 bankruptcy.

== See also ==
- Shops at Wiregrass
- Clarksburg Premium Outlets
