= David Gee (sheriff) =

American lawman

29th Sheriff of Hillsborough County
- In office January 4, 2004 – September 30, 2017
- Preceded by: Cal Henderson
- Succeeded by: Chad Chronister

Personal details
- Party: Republican
- Education: University of Tampa

David Gee is the former sheriff of Hillsborough County, Florida. He was sheriff from 2004 until his retirement on September 30, 2017, having worked in the Hillsborough County Sheriff's Office for more than twenty years prior to his election.

Gee's tenure was a successful one: the crime rate in the county fell each of the last nine years of his tenure. He was praised for his office's "enlightened approach to homelessness", but criticized for "traditional criminalization tactics for low-level offenses such as misdemeanor marijuana possession". In February 8, 2018, Gee was honored by the Florida Cabinet alongside former Hillsborough County State Attorney Mark Ober. On September 23, just one week before his last day as Sheriff, Gee was awarded the Tampa Bay Area Chiefs of Police Association Lifetime Achievement Award. In October 2018, Sheriff Chad Chronister renamed the Hillsborough County Sheriff's Office's Aviation Hangar to the David Gee Aviation Complex.

Gee is a graduate of the University of Tampa. He is a member of the Republican Party.

== Elections ==
2004 Hillsborough County Sheriff Election
Party	Candidate	Votes	%	±%
Republican	David Gee	366,192	98.3%	
Other	(Write-In Candidates)	6,336	1.7%	

2008 Hillsborough County Sheriff Election
Party	Candidate	Votes	%	±%
Republican	David Gee (incumbent)	elected unopposed		

2012 Hillsborough County Sheriff Election
Party	Candidate	Votes	%	±%
Republican	David Gee (incumbent)	408,801	96.72%	
Other	(Write-In Candidates)	13,855	3.28%	

2016 Hillsborough County Sheriff Election
Party	Candidate	Votes	%	±%
Republican	David Gee (incumbent)	elected unopposed		
