= Clarksburg Premium Outlets =

Shopping center in Montgomery County, Maryland, U.S.

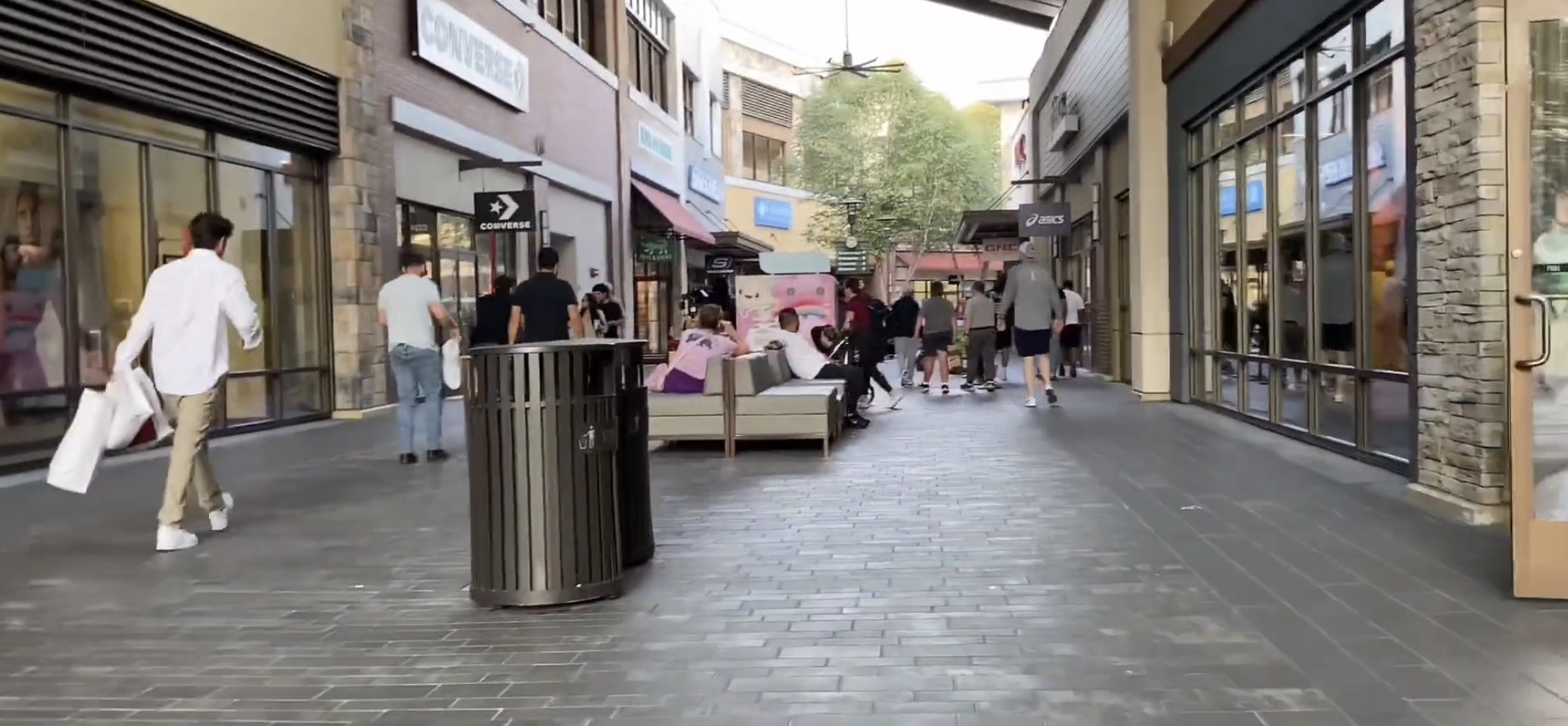
- First floor concourse (October 2024)
- Location: Clarksburg, Maryland, U.S.
- Coordinates: 39°13′42″N 77°17′8″W
- Address: 22705 Clarksburg Rd, 20871
- Opened: October 27, 2016; 10 years ago
- Developer: Simon Property Group; New England Development, Inc.; Streetscape Partners
- Manager: Simon Premium Outlets
- Owner: Simon Property Group (66%); New England Development, Inc. and Streetscape Partners (34%)
- Architect: Architects Orange
- Num. of stores: 90+ (at peak)
- Num. of anchor tenants: 1 (vacant since April 2026)
- Floors: 2
- Website: www.premiumoutlets.com/outlet/clarksburg

Clarksburg Premium Outlets is an open-air shopping mall in Clarksburg, Maryland, part of the Washington, D.C. metropolitan area. It is the only outlet destination in Montgomery County, and the first two-story outdoor outlet center developed in the United States.

The mall was primarily developed by Simon Property Group, which continues to manage the property under its Premium Outlets division, and owns 66% of it. As of 2016, it is the third and final Premium Outlets property in Maryland, with the other two being Queenstown Premium Outlets and Hagerstown Premium Outlets.

== History ==
=== Background ===
On October 6, 2008, the Cabin Branch development plan was enacted. This would include senior housing and additional employment. The site of Clarksburg Premium Outlets was part of this development plan.

=== 2014–2016: Development and opening ===
The shopping center was developed as a joint venture with Simon Property Group, New England Development of Boston, Massachusetts, and Streetscape Partners of Rockville, as part of the Cabin Branch development. The Master Plan allowed the shopping center to have up to 450,000 square feet (42,000 m^{2}) of retail space.

In February 2014, zoning was approved for the project that would be a new outlet mall as part of Simon's Premium Outlets portfolio, located southwest of Interstate 270's Exit 18 at Maryland Route 121. The mall would be 30 miles north of Washington, D.C., and 50 miles west of Baltimore. This would be the third Premium Outlets mall in Maryland after Queenstown Premium Outlets and Hagerstown Premium Outlets. It was estimated that Clarksburg Premium Outlets would create over 1,500 full and part-time jobs, and more than $150 million in private investment. The mall would also have 392,000 square feet (36,400 m^{2}) of retail space. The Orange, California-based architectural firm AO Architects (Architects Orange) was hired as the lead designer.

Construction began on October 21, 2015, with an estimated opening of fall 2016. Clarksburg Premium Outlets would be Simon's second mall to be LEED-certified, with LED lighting, solar energy, and stormwater management. On October 27, 2016, the mall had its grand opening celebration. Its design included landscaping, fireplaces, fountains, a children's play area and custom art. The mall's only major anchor was Saks Off 5th. Other original tenants included Banana Republic, Brooks Brothers, Gap Outlet, and the Nike Factory Store. Clarksburg Premium Outlets was the first two-story outdoor outlet center in the country.

=== 2017–present ===
In April 2017, four stores were added to the mall: Adidas, Superdry, New Balance Factory Store, and Carlisle Collection. By June 2018, the Market Hall food court and two standalone retail/restaurants were completed, bringing Clarksburg Premium Outlets to 437,000 square feet (40,600 m^{2}). This left two pad sites undeveloped. The mall closed temporarily on March 18, 2020, due to the COVID-19 pandemic, and would remain closed until March 29. Other Simon properties in the country also closed because of the pandemic.

In November 2024, eight tenants were announced to open at the mall, including Vera Bradley, Mimi's Handmade Ice Cream, Health Pub Nutrient Bowl's & Smoothie's, and Soccer Emporium. However, Health Pub closed permanently in October 2025. Due to the Chapter 11 bankruptcy of its parent company, Saks Global, Saks Off 5th announced in February 2026 that its Clarksburg Premium Outlets store would close its doors. A minor fire occurred on September 30, 2025, causing damage to multiple storefronts. In May 2026, Hollister announced that they would open at Clarksburg Premium Outlets.

Starbucks closed permanently on September 30, 2026.

== See also ==
- Arundel Mills
- Tsawwassen Mills
- Potomac Mills
- The Falls
- Tampa Premium Outlets
- The Outlets at Orange
- Bayside Marketplace
