= Hernando County Transit (TheBus) =

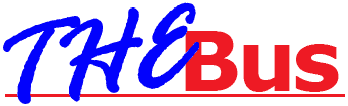

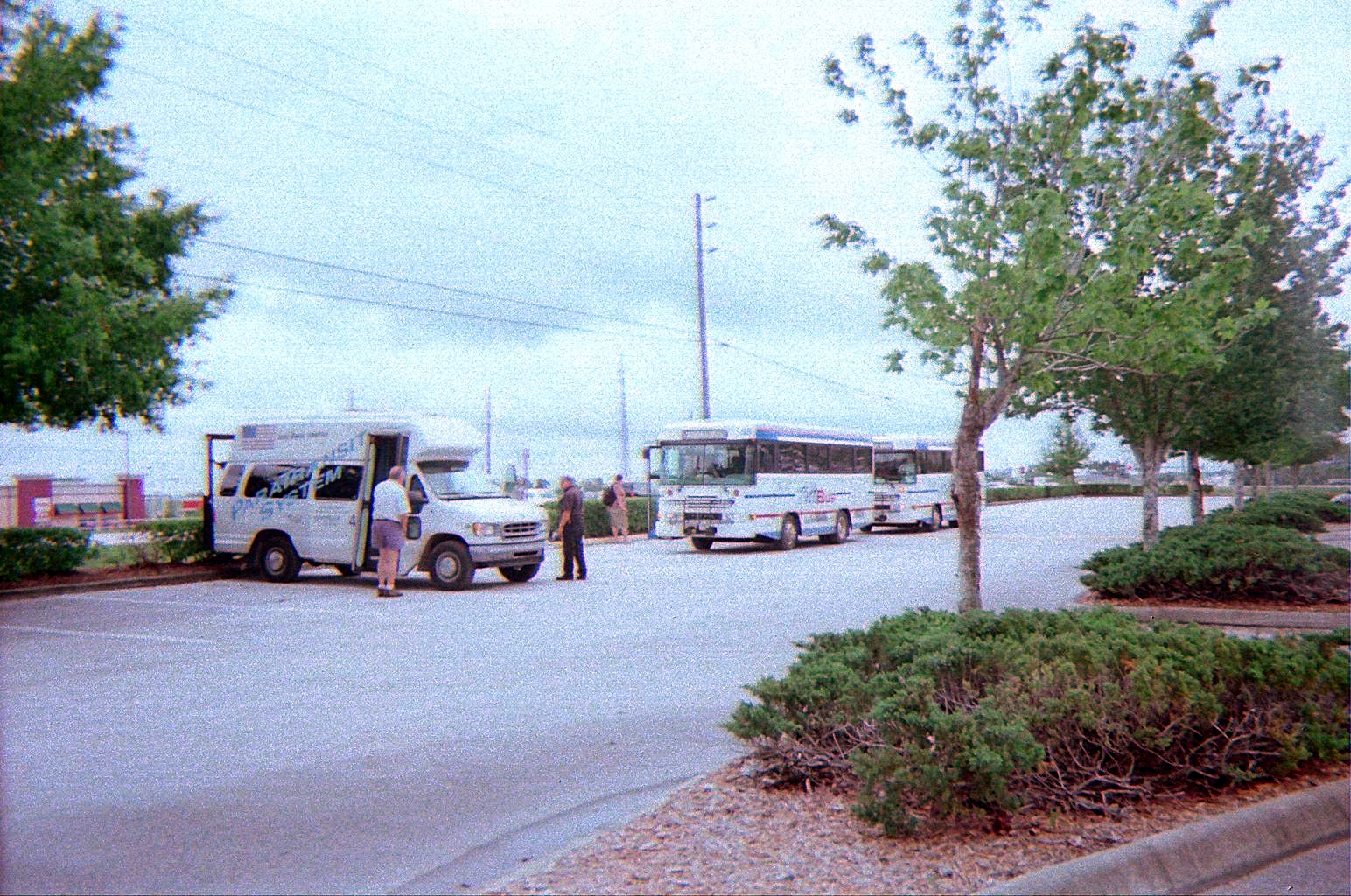
- The Brooksville Shuttle, and Blue Route join Hernando ParaTransit at the Mariner Square shopping center on SR 50 in Spring Hill, Florida.
- Founded: October 28, 2002
- Headquarters: 20 N. Main St. Brooksville, FL 34601
- Locale: Brooksville, Florida
- Service area: Hernando County
- Service type: bus service, paratransit
- Routes: 4
- Destinations: Brooksville, Spring Hill, Pasco County
- Hubs: Brooksville, Spring Hill, Pasco County
- Fuel type: Diesel
- Operator: RATP Dev
- Website: TheBus

Hernando County Transit (TheBus) is a cooperative effort of the Hernando County Board of County Commissioners, Metropolitan Planning Organization, City of Brooksville, Florida Department of Transportation, Federal Transit Administration and RATP Dev in serving the people of Hernando County with affordable public transportation.

== History ==
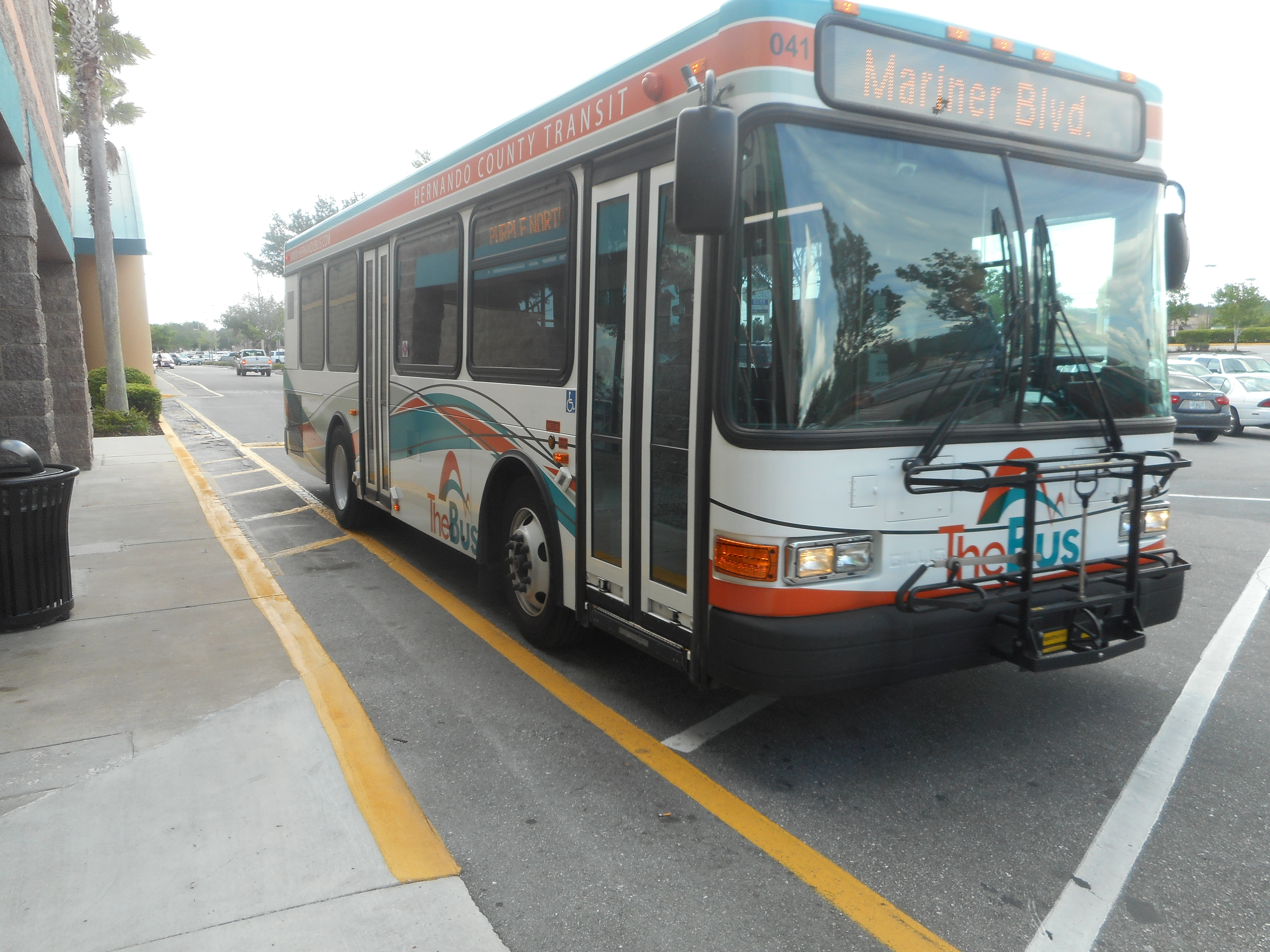
Bus at Mariner Square Shopping Plaza, Spring Hill

Prior to the establishment of TheBus, the only resemblance to public transportation available in Hernando County was a tourist bus company in Brooksville, and a local ParaTransit company, both which were privately owned.

On October 28, 2002, service commenced on the Spring Hill Routes (Red and Blue) serving the greater Spring Hill area. One week later on November 4, 2002, the Brooksville Purple Route commenced service, serving the Brooksville area with a connection to the Spring Hill Routes on SR 50. The system began with 4 buses in Spring Hill and 1 bus in Brooksville. By the 7th day of operation, ridership surpassed the 3rd year projection of 200 trips per day, with ridership of 219 trips. After 22 months of operation, TheBus was averaging 425 to 434 trips per day. The service was only available on weekdays.

Throughout the 2010s, service was further expanded with the additions of the Green Route, extensions of the Purple Route including the systems first connection in Pasco County, and extensive realignments of the Blue and Purple Routes. Service was increased to provide hourly service on all routes. In October 2019, Saturday service was introduced in addition to increases in service hours on weekdays.

The system operates Monday–Saturday. There is no Sunday service, nor service on certain holidays.

== Routes ==
Hernando County Transit (TheBus) operates 4 fixed bus routes throughout Hernando County, including a connection to Pasco County's Public Transit Route 21 via the Purple Route.

as of October 1st, 2019
Route Color	From	To	Notes
Blue	Walmart - SR 50 Brooksville	Bayfront Health - Spring Hill (Hospital) Spring Hill	
Red	Mariner & Northcliffe Blvd Spring Hill	Walmart - US 19 & Spring Hill Drive Spring Hill	
Purple	Pasco Hernando State College Brooksville Campus	Scheer Commerce Center Emerald Beach Blvd & US 19, Hudson, Pasco County	Connection to Pasco County Public Transit Route 21 Serves Weeki Wachee Springs
Green	Walmart - US 41 & Wiscon Road Brooksville	Pasco Hernando State College Spring Hill Campus Spring Hill	Serves Brooksville-Tampa Regional Airport
