= Pinellas Suncoast Transit Authority =

Public transportation provider in Pinellas County, Florida, U.S.

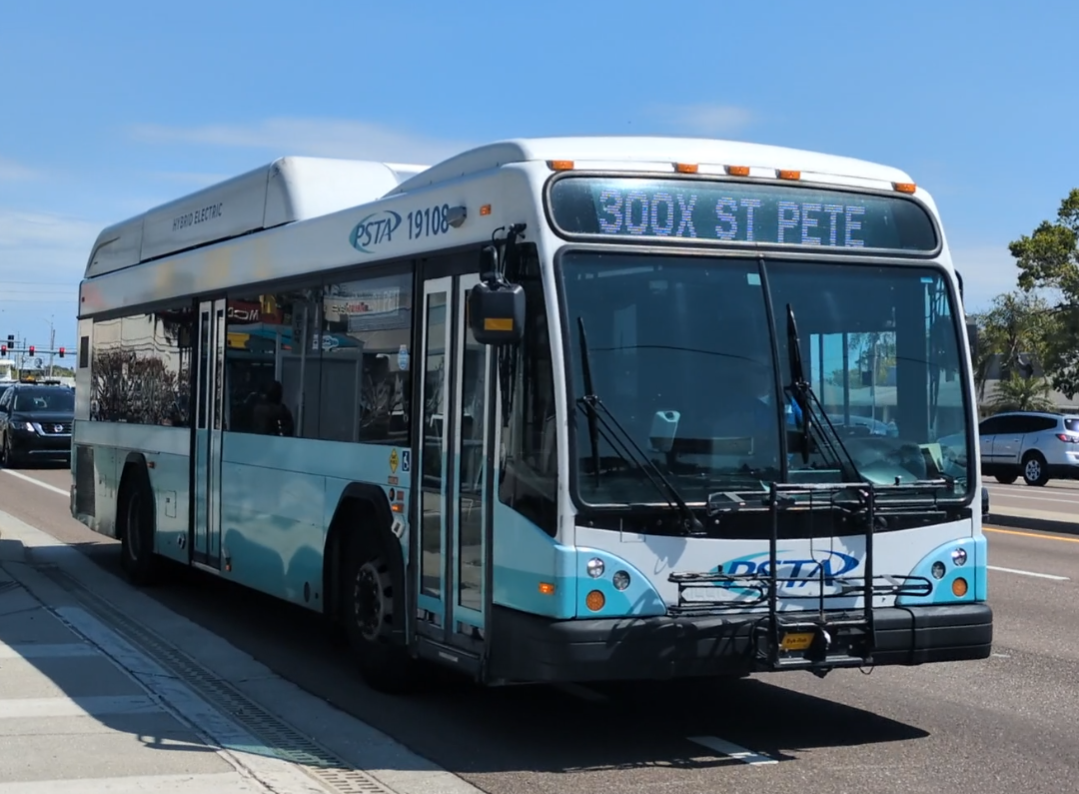
- Founded: 1984
- Headquarters: 3201 Scherer Drive; St. Petersburg, Florida
- Locale: Pinellas County, Florida
- Service type: Bus service, paratransit, vanpool
- Routes: 43
- Stops: 4,486 (2025)
- Fleet: 240 buses and 252 other vehicles (2025)
- Daily ridership: 31,200 (weekdays, Q2 2026)
- Annual ridership: 9,829,100 (2025)
- Fuel type: Diesel, diesel–electric hybrid, battery electric
- Chief executive: Brad Miller
- Employees: 668 (2025)
- Website: www.psta.net

The Pinellas Suncoast Transit Authority (PSTA) is a government agency that provides public transportation for Pinellas County, Florida. It is based in St. Petersburg and manages 43 bus routes, paratransit, contracted ferries, vanpools, and other services across 304 square miles (790 km^{2}). The agency has a bus rapid transit line, named the SunRunner, and express buses to Tampa. PSTA provided a total of 9,829,100 passenger trips in 2025.

== History ==
=== Beginnings ===
PSTA's roots trace back to the early 1900s as the St. Petersburg Municipal Transit System (SPMTS). The system began with a streetcar line to Gulfport and eight buses to run several routes throughout the St. Pete area. Unlike the advent and expansion of Tampa's original streetcar system, the Gulfport streetcar only encompassed 23 miles of track along its singular line. However, the line proved to be popular amongst area residents during its heyday. In 1928, the entire SPMTS system carried 4.2 million customers, marking a major milestone for the agency. As the 1930s came and went, streetcar usage began to decline - as was the case nationwide. By 1949, the streetcar line had closed, marking the end of streetcar service in Pinellas County as a whole.

=== Merger ===
Despite the demise of the Gulfport trolley, bus service throughout Pinellas County continued to expand throughout the 1940s, 50s, and 60s. In 1970, the Central Pinellas Transit Authority (CPTA) was formed, serving the Clearwater area and northern Pinellas. The agency was fully established by 1973 and operated 9 routes with a fleet of 21 buses. The CPTA saw 900,000 riders in its first year of service. In 1975, SPMTS begins paratransit services and both agencies continue to expand their fleet. In 1978, tourist trolley service (using trolley-replica buses) began in downtown St. Petersburg and became successful. By the 1980s, the two agencies formed a cooperative agreement, which allowed the expansion of routes throughout Pinellas County. This agreement also led to the creation of a single customer service phone number. In October 1984, the two companies formally merged (via an act of the Florida Legislature) to create the PSTA.

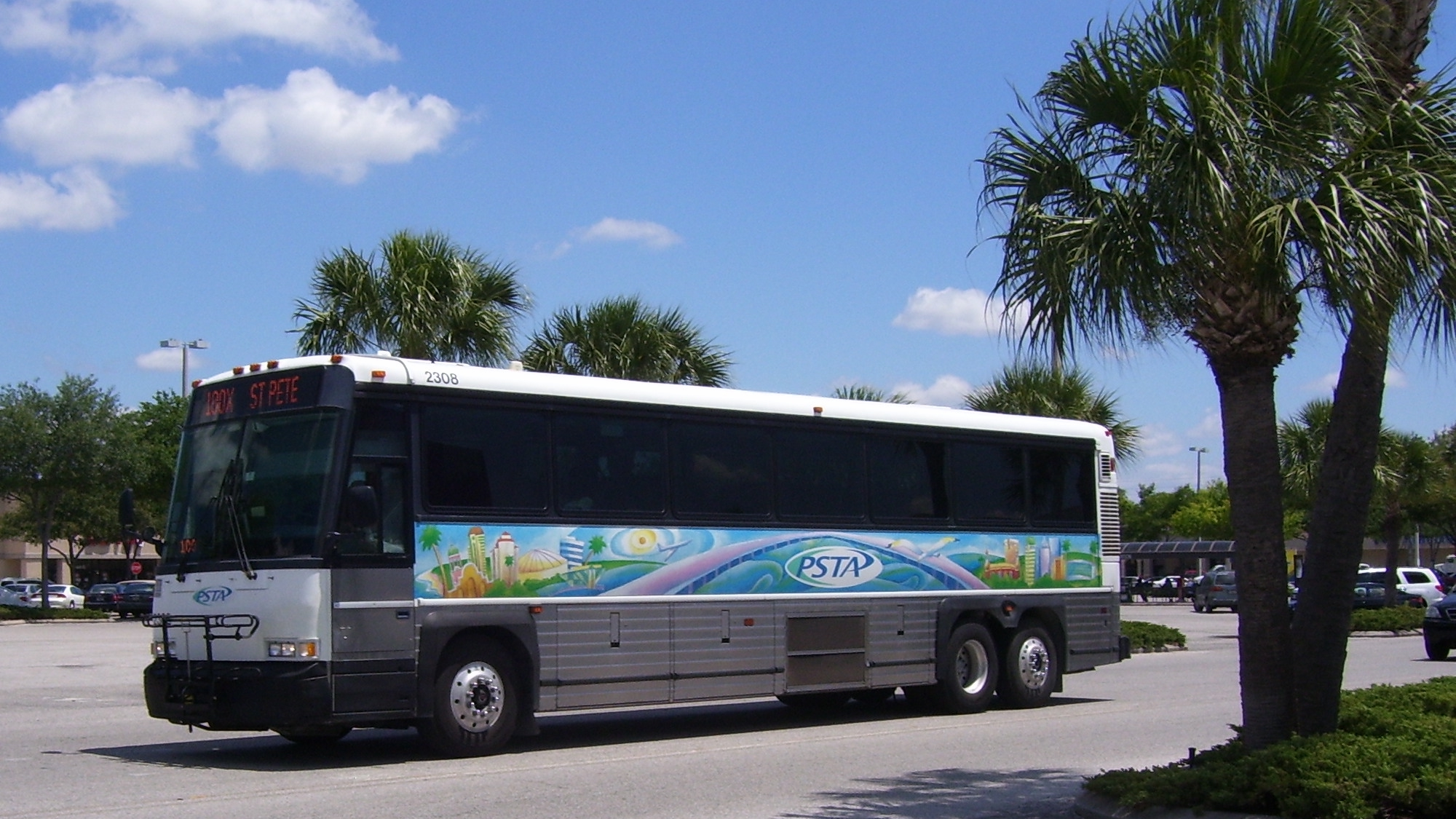
PSTA express bus in 2008

=== Expansion ===
In the years following their merger, PSTA operated nearly 80 routes with a fleet of nearly 130 buses. The agency begins installing electronic fareboxes and completed its central Pinellas operations center, as well as several bus terminals. In 1990, PSTA obtained its first express route, previously operated by Hillsborough Area Regional Transit (HART). Also in 1990, PSTA established a cross-county bus route via US 19. Further expansion of bus service continued through the 1990s and 2000s; with the construction of bus terminals at Williams Park in Downtown St. Petersburg (opening in 1994) and the Central Plaza Terminal (now known as Grand Central Station) in the Grand Central District off Central Ave near US 19 (opening in 2002). The agency introduced electronic fare cards known as "Go Cards" in 1996, as well as accelerated replacement of outdated buses. In 2001, the Suncoast Beach Trolley began service along the gulf coast beaches and in 2003, PSTA purchased a fleet of commuter buses to operate its express routes. A year later, PSTA and HART introduced an intersystem Passport to allow customers to use each other's systems for a single monthly fare. In 2005, PSTA relocated all of its operations to a single, unified facility in northern St. Petersburg - near Ulmerton Rd and Roosevelt Blvd. In 2006, HART and PSTA agreed to honor each other's reduced fare photo permits.

From the 2009 onward, PSTA began purchasing diesel-electric hybrid buses and attempted to bring forth further expanded bus service, as well as premium transit service such as bus rapid transit or light rail to Pinellas County. This began with a Memorandum of Understanding between the agency, the Tampa Bay Area Regional Transit Authority, the Florida Department of Transportation, and the Pinellas County Metropolitan Planning Organization to conduct an Alternatives Analysis of transit corridors in Pinellas County. This was then followed up by a series of public engagement sessions and eventually the failed attempt in 2014 by Pinellas County to pass a sales tax referendum (Greenlight Pinellas). In 2012, the agency launched the North County Connector flex-route van service, allowing customers in areas of northern Pinellas to have access to transit service - including those in neighborhoods by which regular transit buses have difficulty accessing or where a traditional fixed bus route would have lower ridership projections. The three routes have since been modified to serve areas with demand for the service.

In 2017, PSTA began Direct Connect, which allows customers to summon a ride via taxi or ride share to connect to or from a designated stop or bus terminal. In 2018, a partnership between PSTA, HART, Pasco County Public Transportation, and transit agencies in Hernando, Manatee, and Sarasota counties began working on a regional fare collection system called Flamingo Fares Tampa Bay. This system would allow customers to use either a smartphone app or a smart card to tap a reader device and pay for their transit fares in a seamless, contactless manner. While Manatee County was involved in the initial phase of the program, county officials decided to leave the project in pursuit of a different fare collection vendor. The same year, PSTA announced that it would partner with Transit App to help provide real-time bus arrival predictions and eventually other features to customers via the use of smartphones. The agency also introduced its first two battery electric buses - produced by BYD, and revamped Route 300X to serve Tampa International Airport on most trips.

In 2018, PSTA pushed ahead with planning for what would become the SunRunner, with planning for the project reaching 60% completion by September, 2019. The SunRunner branding was formally unveiled in 2020, along with the project groundbreaking. Despite delays in the project - partly due to the COVID-19 pandemic, the SunRunner opened to customers on October 21, 2022 to great fanfare. On January 10th, 2025, PSTA opened the new 150 1st Ave North station, featuring glass artwork created by Catherine Woods. A new program was launched on January 10th, called "SunRunner After Dark"; which extended the full service hours until midnight on Friday and Saturday nights. The program is subsidized by the City of St. Pete.

In 2020, PSTA placed an order for 62 new Battery Electric Gillig built buses that will be built over the course of 2023-2028. These buses will replace all of the older Diesel buses built between 2005 and 2008. This is a part of PSTA's plan to go all electric by 2050. During the delivery of the units, the order was altered to now include 78 electrics and 9 hybrids. Deliveries started in 2023 and finished ahead of schedule in May 2026.

Effective January 2, 2024, PSTA would stop accepting the old "GO Cards", in favor of contactless payment via Flamingo Fares.

In 2024, PSTA released the Connect Community Bus Network plan (CCBN). The plan was to completely overhaul the bus network while also making service more consistent and efficient than with the previous network. The agency has a goal of having all services run 7 days a week under CCBN. The service changes went into effect in October 2025.

In October 2026, the PSTA launched the 727 Airport Express bus from Downtown St. Pete to Tampa International Airport.

== Services ==
PSTA operates 34 routes (including one limited express route) that traverse Pinellas County and 2 express routes that connect into downtown Tampa. The SunRunner is a bus rapid transit route with service every 15 minutes; the Spark also runs every 15 minutes as a shuttle between Eckerd College and Grand Central Bus Terminal. PSTA contracts service for their on-demand microtransit system, Grouper, and the Clearwater Ferry.

In addition to the cross-bay express routes, PSTA also provides connections to Hillsborough Area Regional Transit (HART) bus routes 16, 34, 35, and 39 via PSTA route 78 (78A). PSTA also provides connections to Pasco County Public Transportation (PCPT) bus route 19 via PSTA route 19.

=== Trolley routes ===
PSTA operates two fixed-route trolley services using trolley-replica buses - the Central Ave Trolley (CAT) and the Suncoast Beach Trolley (SBT). The CAT traverses Central Ave between Downtown St. Pete's Pier District and Grand Central Station, while the SBT traverses Gulf Blvd between Clearwater Beach and St. Pete Beach (the latter also serves Downtown Clearwater via the Memorial Causeway Bridge). Until December, 2023, the CAT served St. Pete Beach.

The CAT connects to other PSTA routes along Central Ave - including at Grand Central Station and Downtown St. Pete. The SBT connects to Route 59 in Indian Rocks Beach, Route 38 at Johns Pass, and other routes in Clearwater.

=== North County Connector ===
The North County Connector was originally launched in 2012 and was modeled off of HART's HART Flex service. The sub-network used cutaway vans to access areas of northern Pinellas County that would be otherwise inaccessible to standard transit buses. The three original routes consisted of Route 811 - serving the eastern Lake Tarpon area, Route 812 - serving Oldsmar and Town-N-Country, and Route 813 - serving Palm Harbor. Route 811 was eliminated in 2015 due to low usage. In 2016, service to Safety Harbor was added in part due to the rerouting of Route 62. This eventually led to the creation of Route 814 in 2016.

In 2019, the routes were restructured to become standard fixed routes. However, the 800-series route numbers were kept due to the continuation of the routes being operated by cutaway vans.

In December, 2023, Route 812 was eliminated due to low ridership, while Route 814 was converted into a fully on-demand based model. Customers may contact PSTA by phone or use the PSTA Access smartphone app to summon a ride 814 | PSTA.

On October 26th, 2025, the 813 was renamed and merged with the Route 78 (now called the Route 78A). The vans that ran along the old 813 were retired and placed into storage shortly after, being replaced with full sized buses.

=== SunRunner ===
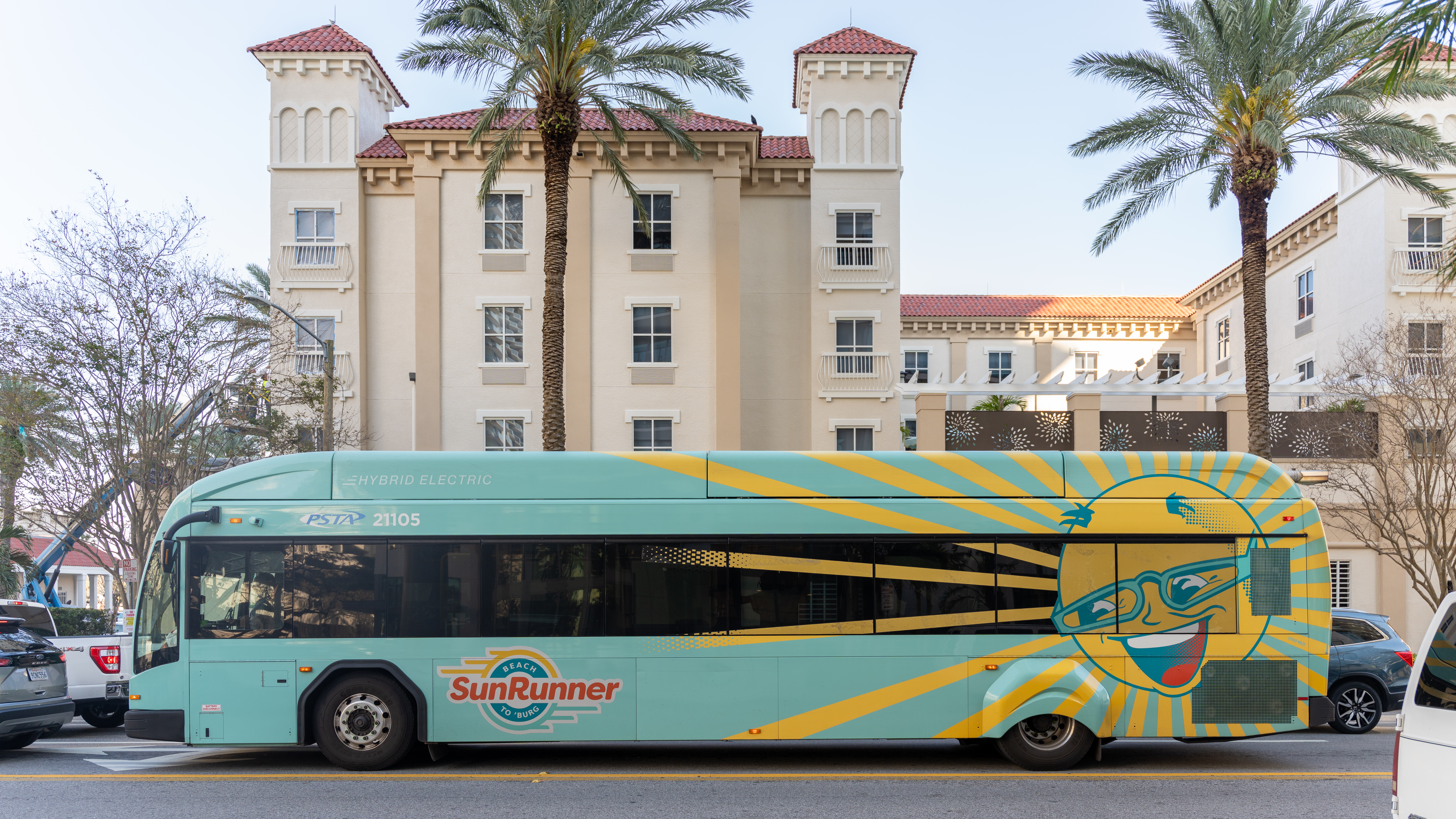
SunRunner bus

In 2009, PSTA began planning for a bus rapid transit (BRT) service to better serve customers along higher-ridership corridors. The first area of focus is the 1st Ave N/1st Ave S and Pasadena Ave corridors to allow customers a faster trip between Downtown St. Pete and St. Pete Beach(Beach to 'Burg). In the mid 2010s, concrete plans were presented for the county's first BRT route utilizing the aforementioned corridors. In 2019, the SunRunner name was given to the project and construction began in 2020. The SunRunner launched in October 2022.

The SunRunner route operates on fifteen-minute intervals everyday from 6:00 a.m. to 8:00 p.m. Monday through Thursday. Buses continue to run on their full schedule until midnight on Friday and Saturday nights due to a program called Sunrunner after dark, launched in January 2025. The 1st Ave N, 1st Ave S, and Pasadena Ave corridors utilize dedicated bus lanes with stylized stations. Stylized stations are placed along Gulf Ave, however buses still mostly run in mixed traffic. The Sunrunner utilizes 40' Gillig BRT Plus buses.

In October 2025, the Florida Department of Transportation removed the SunRunner's dedicated bus-only lane on the state-controlled Pasadena Avenue in South Pasadena, converting it back to a general traffic lane. The removal followed criticism from Governor Ron DeSantis and state Republican legislators, who argued the project was "anti-commuter." Transit officials opposed the decision, stating it would slow service and could jeopardize federal funding, while pointing to data showing the lanes had improved safety and travel times on other parts of the route. The lane removal prompted a formal ethics complaint from a transit activist, who alleged the action may have violated a 2024 state law requiring a traffic study and a public meeting before repurposing lanes. The complaint also questioned the validity of the crash data used by the Florida Department of Transportation to justify its decision.

== Ferries ==
=== Clearwater Ferry ===
The PSTA has a partnership with the Clearwater Ferry which was founded in 2015 and initially privately owned. The partnership formally started in January 2025.

On April 27, 2025 at 8:43pm, one person died and several were injured after a 37' recreational boat with 6 aboard collided with a dimly lit 40' PSTA pontoon boat with 44 aboard. A lawsuit was filed on behalf of the recreational boat captain and claimed that the Clearwater Ferry pontoon boat lacked sufficient lighting.

=== Cross-Bay Ferry ===
The original Cross-Bay Ferry service was launched in 2016, and was operated by HMS Ferries - with ticketing and certain other operational tasks being handled by Hornblower Cruises. Funding was supplied by the governments of Pinellas and Hillsborough Counties, the cities of St. Petersburg and Tampa, and the Florida Department of Transportation. The service ran for eight seasons (six consecutively between 2018 & 2025) before the agreements were terminated due to the inability of HMS fulfilling its contractual obligations to provide a reliable ferry vessel that can support year-round service, instead of seasonal fall to spring service.

A federal grant that was originally awarded to HART to purchase a ferry vessel for a now-failed Apollo Beach to MacDill Air Force Base ferry service was able to be approved by both the HART and PSTA boards to be transferred to the latter to allow for the purchase of at least one vessel to restart the Cross-Bay Ferry service - which PSTA would oversee, but contract out operations. In June 2026, PSTA purchased 2 ferry vessels to be used on the new Cross-Bay Ferry.

== Fleet ==
PSTA operates a fleet of 240 buses and 252 demand-response vehicles. The bus fleet comprises a fleet of Gillig Low Floor and BRT buses as well as BYD buses. They are powered by diesel fuel or are diesel–electric hybrids and battery electric buses. All buses were equipped with barrier shields in the operator area during the course of 2020 through 2021, and many buses are being fitted with interior screens that display passenger information. From 2002 to 2008, PSTA installed yellow flashing strobe lights at the rear of their buses for extra visibility, but these were eventually removed around the mid-2010s and replaced with normal red brake lights.

PSTA runs smaller paratransit buses and vans are used on a service called PSTA Access. These vehicles use 3-digit fleet numbers to distinguish them from the heavy-duty transit vehicles. PSTA's paratransit services are managed by TransDev.

== Facilities and hubs ==
- Grand Central Station in Downtown St. Petersburg
- Bay Point Plaza
- Park Street Terminal in Downtown Clearwater
- Tyrone Square Mall
- Countryside Mall
- Gateway Mall
- Pinellas Park Transit Center
- PSTA Complex (34th Street Transfer Center)
- St. Petersburg - Clearwater International Airport
- Largo Transit Center
- Ulmerton Park-n-Ride
- Largo Mall
- Seminole Shopping Center
- Clearwater Beach Transit Center
- HART Northwest Transfer Center
