= Pasco County Public Transportation =

Bus transportation provider in Pasco County, Florida

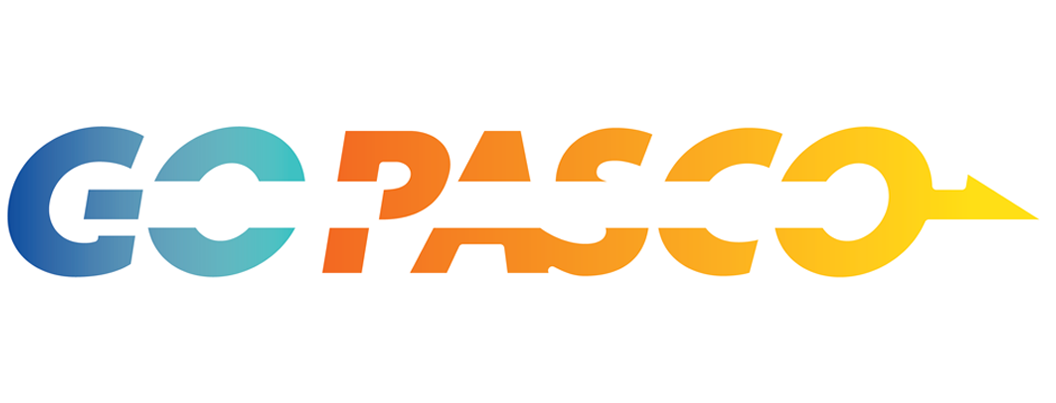

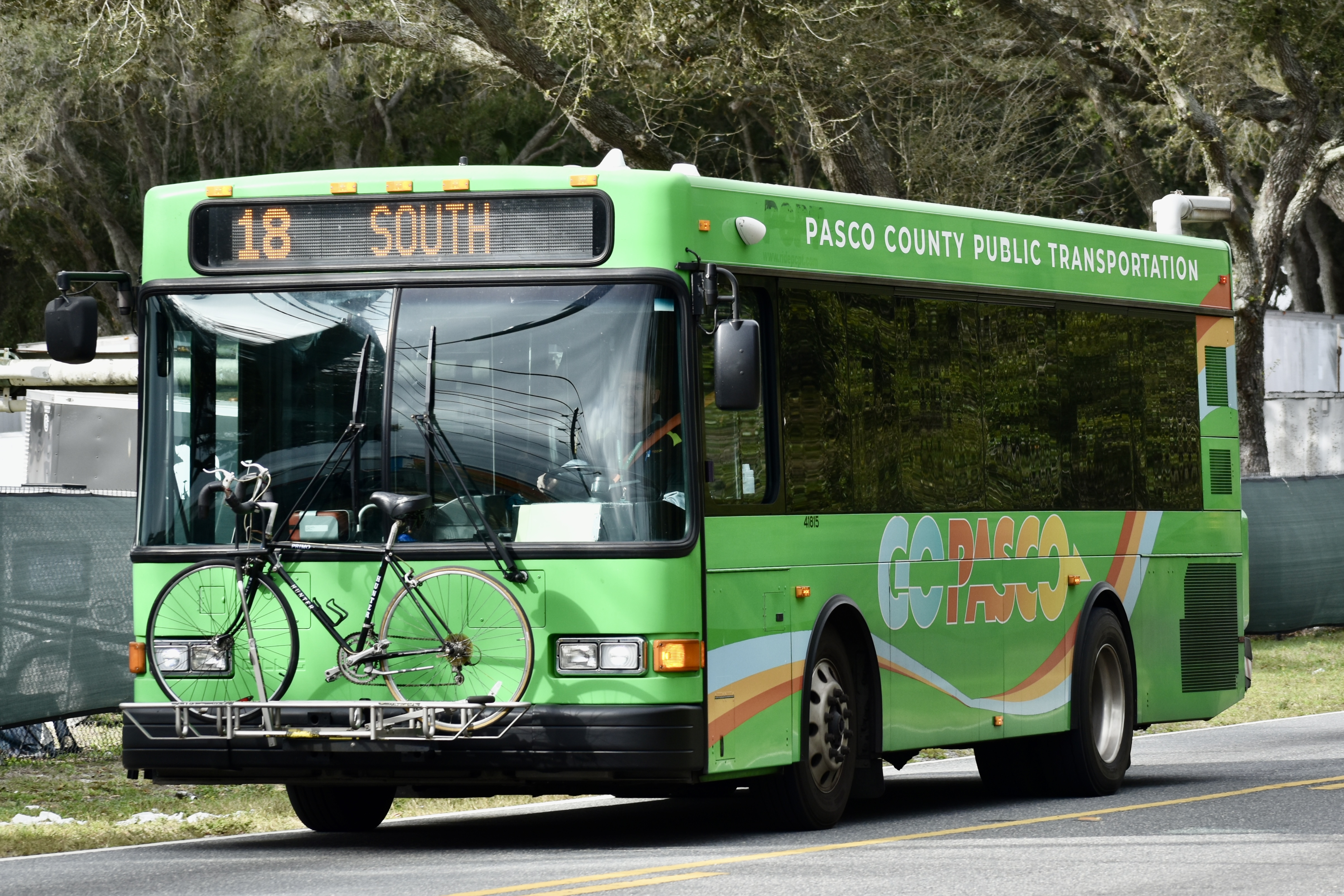
- GOPASCO bus #18 traveling down Grand Boulevard in Holiday, Florida.
- Headquarters: 8620 Galen Wilson Boulevard
- Locale: Port Richey, Florida
- Service area: Pasco County
- Service type: Bus service; Paratransit
- Routes: 14
- Destinations: Dade City; Land O' Lakes; New Port Richey; Port Richey; Trinity; Wesley Chapel; Zephyrhills
- Hubs: Port Richey; New Port Richey; Zephyrhills; Dade City
- Fuel type: Diesel
- Operator: Pasco County Board of County Commissioners
- Website: GOPASCO

Pasco County Public Transportation (or GOPASCO) provides public transportation in Pasco County, Florida. The agency operates both fixed bus and paratransit services, which go door-to-door.

== History ==
On March 5, 2012, a new weekday, cross-county route was added running along State Road 54. This service connects the east and west bus systems.

In 2021, Pasco County Public Transportation unveiled a new logo, celebrating its 50 years of service, now known as GOPASCO.

=== Changes ===
In January 2022, GOPASCO the State Road 52 and Ridge Road section of Route 21 changed to be serviced by Route 16. Additionally, Route 21's service on Little road went to Route 23, and Route 21 and 23's service at Gulf View Square Mall will be added to other routes. Route 23 service on Embassy Road was suspended, with no service for the time being.

== Fare ==
GOPASCO offers several different fares for different uses. Additionally, GOPASCO sometimes offers deals. For example, in the summer of 2025, GOPASCO offered a $20 Summer Haul Pass from months June - August, with unlimited rides for students.

=== Pricing ===
The fare prices for bus passes vary:

| Fare/Fee Type | Fare | Reduced Fare |
|---|---|---|
| One-Way | $1.50 | $0.75 |
| One-Day (Unlimited Rides) | $3.75 | $1.85 |
| 31-Day (Unlimited Rides) | $37.50 | $18.75 |
| 20-Ride (90-day period) | $25.00 | $12.50 |
| Veterans | Free | n/a |
| Children under four years old | Free | n/a |
| GOPASCO Reduced & Fare Photo ID | $2.50 | n/a |

Reduced fare is an option for:

- Persons 65 years or older
- Students of any age
- Person with a certified disability
- Medicare card holder

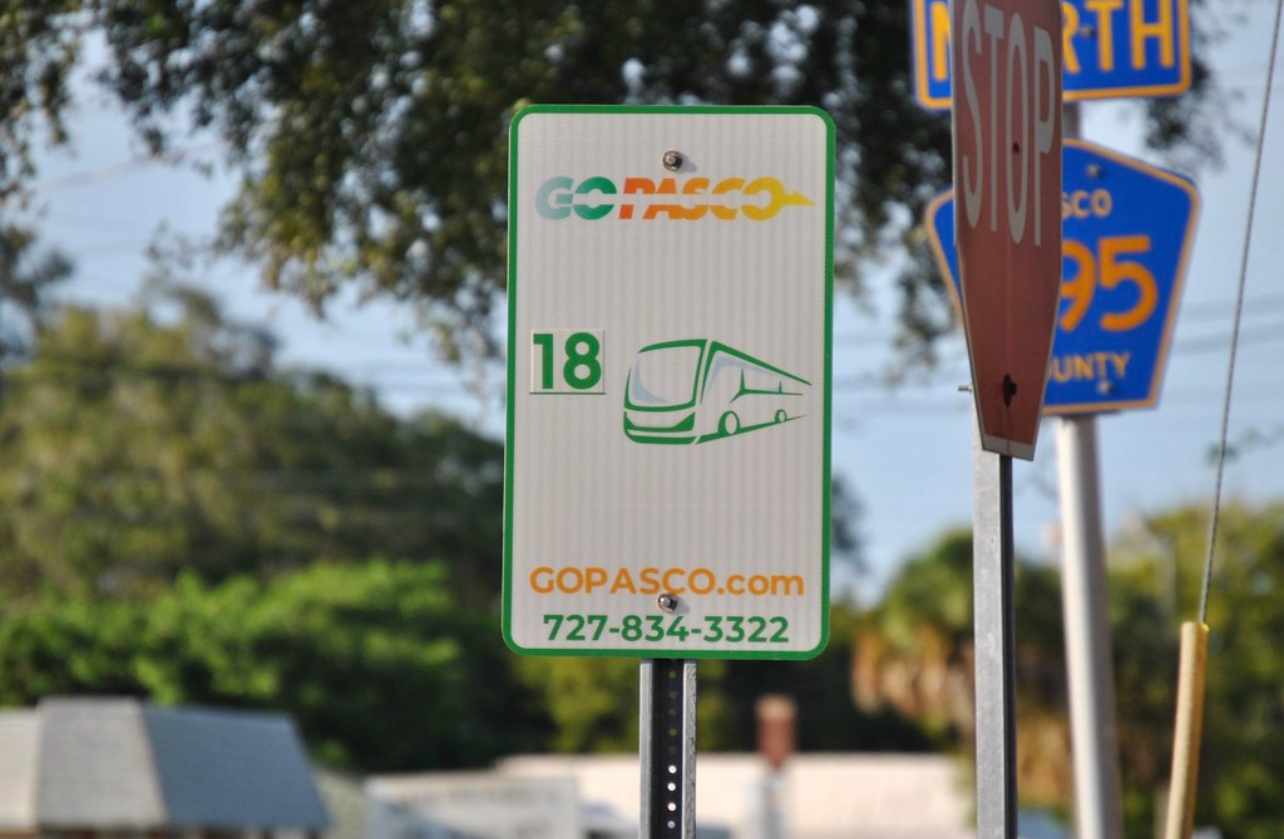
Pasco county public transportation (GOPASCO) bus stop 18 sign.

== Bus Routes ==
As of February 2026, GOPASCO operates fourteen fixed bus routes throughout Pasco County: six in East Pasco, seven in West Pasco. Additionally, a paratransit bus is offered.

=== Route 14 ===
Route 14 serves the central-west side of Pasco County, with 65 stops, connecting Elfers to Pasco-Hernando State College - West Campus. Notable locations it goes to include Downtown New Port Richey, New Port Richey Public Library, West Pasco Government Center, and Pasco-Hernando State College - West Campus.

=== Route 16 ===
Route 16 serves the north-west side of Pasco County, with 61 stops, connecting Moon Lake to Pasco-Hernando State College. Notable locations it goes to include Ridge Road Center, Ridgeway Plaza, Shoppes of Orchid Lake, Chasco Middle School, Pasco Hernando State College - West Campus, Riverwalk Plaza, Moon Lake Mission, La Madera Marketplace, Ponderosa Plaza, and Bayonet Point.

=== Route 18 ===
Route 18 serves the south-west side of Pasco County, with 35 stops, connecting New Port Richey to Tarpon Springs. Notable locations it goes to include The Marketplace of Tarpon Springs, South Holiday Library, Holiday Bible Church, Olympic Plaza, Trouble Creek Square, and Florida Medical Center. The route also connects up to the Pinellas County Bus System (PSTA).

=== Route 19 ===
Route 19 serves the north-west side of Pasco County, with 53 stops, connecting Bayonet Point to Tarpon Springs. Notable locations it goes to include Metropolitan Ministries of West Pasco, Center Plaza, Pasco County Tax Collector's Office, Keiser University, Downtown New Port Richey, Gulf View Square Mall, Embassy Crossing, Regency Shoppes, Gulf Coast Medical Center, and Bayonet Point. The route also connects up to the Pinellas County Bus System (PSTA).

=== Route 21 ===
Route 21 serves the north-west side of Pasco County, with 68 stops, connecting Bayonet Point to Hernando County. Notable locations it goes to include Bayonet Point, Hudson Square Shopping Mall, HCA Florida Bayonet Point Hospital, Pasco Cardiology Center, Hudson Regional Library, and the Scott Medical Plaza. The route also connects up to Hernando County Transit (TheBus).

=== Route 23 ===
Route 23 serves western Pasco County, with 28 stops, connecting Trinity to Hudson. Notable locations it goes to include the Florida Cancer Center, Seven Springs Medical Park, Grand Trinity Plaza, Pasco County Government Center, Regency Park Library, Florida Department of Health, and Fivay High School.

=== Route 24 ===
Route 24 serves western Pasco County, with 20 stops, connecting New Port Richey to Hudson. Notable locations it goes to include West Pasco Government Center, Veterans Hospital, and Fivay High School.

=== Route 25 ===
Route 25 serves eastern Pasco County, with 48 stops, connecting Gulf View Square Mall to Chelsea Place. Notable locations it goes to include Embassy Crossing Center, Lake Lisa Park, Fred K. Marchman Technical College, Downtown New Port Richey, Life Care Center, and Trinity Palms at Seven Springs.

=== Route 30 ===
Route 30 serves eastern Pasco County, with 70 stops, connecting Zephyrhills to Lacoochee. Notable locations it goes to include Veterans of Foreign War, Downtown Zephyrhills, AdventHealth Zephyrhills, Jim Brown Collision Center, Morningside Plaza Shopping Mall, Downtown Dade City, and Withlacoochee State Trail Access.

=== Route 31 ===
Route 31 serves north-east Pasco County, with 40 stops, forming a loop, starting and ending in Dade City. Notable locations it goes to include Downtown Dade City, Pasco High School, Withlacoochee Electric, Pasco Hernando State College - East Campus, and back to Downtown Dade City.

=== Route 35 ===
Route 35 serves south-east Pasco County, with 19 stops, forming a loop, starting and ending in Zephyrhills. Notable locations it goes to include Downtown Zephyrhills and Zephyrhills High School.

=== Route 41 ===
GOPASCO's newest route, Route 41 serves central Pasco County, with 14 stocks, starting in southern Land O' Lakes and ending in Connerton. Notable locations it goes to include Walmart, Land O' Lakes High School, Advent Health Connerton, and Pasco County Jail.

=== Route 54 ===
Route 54 is split into two parts, 54 West and 54 East, both connecting at The Shops at Wiregrass:

==== Route 54 West ====
Route 54 West serves south-west Pasco County, with 23 stops, connecting Elfers to Wesley Chapel. Notable locations it goes to include HCA Florida Trinity Hospital, Starkey Ranch Town Square, Tampa Premium Outlets, and The Shops at Wiregrass.

==== Route 54 East ====
Route 54 East serves south-west Pasco County, with 37 stops, connecting Wesley Chapel to Zephyrhills. Notable locations it goes to include AdventHealth Wesley Chapel, Grove at Wesley Chapel, New River Branch Library. and Downtown Zephyrhills.

=== Paratransit ===
GOPASCO offers Pasco County Paratransit, which is a door-to-door bus service that takes you to one set location and back to your house. The price ranges from $0 to $3.

== Connections ==
=== Connections to Clearwater Jolly Trolley ===
GOPASCO route 18 connects with the Clearwater Jolly Trolly in Tarpon Springs.

=== Connections to Pinellas Suncoast Transit Authority ===
Two GOPASCO bus routes, 18 and 19, provide connectivity with PSTA bus routes 19 and 66 respectively.

=== Connections to Hernando County's TheBus ===
GOPASCO bus Route 20 connects with TheBus's Blue Route, providing an additional connection to Hernando County; GOPASCO bus route 21 connects with TheBus's (Hernando County, Florida) Purple Route Both Routes run on weekdays and Saturdays.

=== Connections to Hillsborough Area Regional Transit ===
GOPASCO bus route 54 connects with HART's commuter express line 275LX.

== Former routes ==
=== Route 20 ===
Route 20 was a route that served the central-north side of Pasco County, connecting Shady Hills to Hernando County. Notable locations it went to included Fivay High School, Hicks Road Baptist Church, Harvest Baptist Church, Hudson High School, Hudson Hills Manor, Florida Health Department, Faith Community Church, and Shady Hills Elementary. The route also connected up to Hernando County Transit (TheBus).

== Fleet ==
- 25 foot Blue Bird (1997/1998/2002): 4/4/4
- 32 Foot Blue Bird (2002): 4
- 30 Foot Blue Bird (2003/7): 3/5
- 35 Foot Blue Bird (2006): 3
