= Cypress Creek Town Center =

Cypress Creek Town Center is a large retail development in Lutz, Florida, a suburb of Tampa. It is anchored by Hobby Lobby, Burlington, Five Below, Costco, and Tampa Premium Outlets.

== History ==
Plans for the Cypress Creek Town Center began in the early 2000s, with the center first approved a Development of Regional Impact (DRI) in 2004, as a "megamall". The project further received permits from the Army Corps of Engineers in 2007, however a combination of legal troubles and economic downturn caused the delay and effective cancellation of the project. Saks Off Fifth was the first tenant announced for the modern incarnation of the center, as part of the Tampa Premium Outlets in 2012, with a projected opening date of 2014. Costco was first announced in December 2014, however by this point the opening date had already been pushed back to Summer 2015. By early 2015, the opening date had been pushed back to Fall 2015 and further tenants had been announced by May, including Kohl's, Chick-fil-A, Culver's, and Cheddar's Scratch Kitchen, however Kohl's never opened despite these plans. Further restaurant tenants in the form of BJ's Brewhouse and Panda Express were announced in June. By August, the outlets were described as "nearly complete" with a job fair planned for August 27. Culver's opened February 29, with Starbucks and On the Border having joined the list of planned tenants at this time. The outlets opened in October 2015, on schedule.

Cheddar's opened June 6, with Chick-Fil-A to follow June 30. By 2018, a 130-room Hyatt Hotel was announced at the edge of the development. By March, the list of tenants had greatly expanded, including a strip mall containing Mellow Mushroom, Great Clips, Mattress One, Men's Wearhouse, and Aspen Dental, with a nail bar, Noire Nail Bar, set to open soon. Chuy's was set for a Spring 2018 opening, with Bahama Breeze under construction. By this time several more restaurants, including Taco Bell, Wendy's, Pollo Tropical, and Ford's Garage had also opened. Plans for a Burlington and a PetSmart, which has so far not developed, were also announced. Further upcoming tenants were announced at a chamber of commerce sponsored luncheon, including Chipotle, Hobby Lobby, HomeGoods, Earth Fare, Blaze Pizza, and Walk-on Bistreaux & Bar. At Home and Five Below were under construction by June, followed by MOD Pizza in August. Earth Fare opened in February 2019. Hobby Lobby, Burlington, and Five Below all opened in March followed by HomeGoods in April. Most recently, restaurants Aussie Grill, Carrabba's Italian Grill, and Bonefish Grill are all planned to join the development. Aldi, who filed preliminary plans as early as 2017 is still projected to open at the center.

Maps of the development from the Neighborhood News in 2017 and 2018 show Party City and Dick's Sporting Goods as future tenants, however it is unknown if these plans were ever concrete or were just pure speculation, Earth Fare filed for Chapter 11 bankruptcy and then would close all stores including the Cypress Creek location.
