= Chad Chronister =

American law enforcement officer (born 1968)

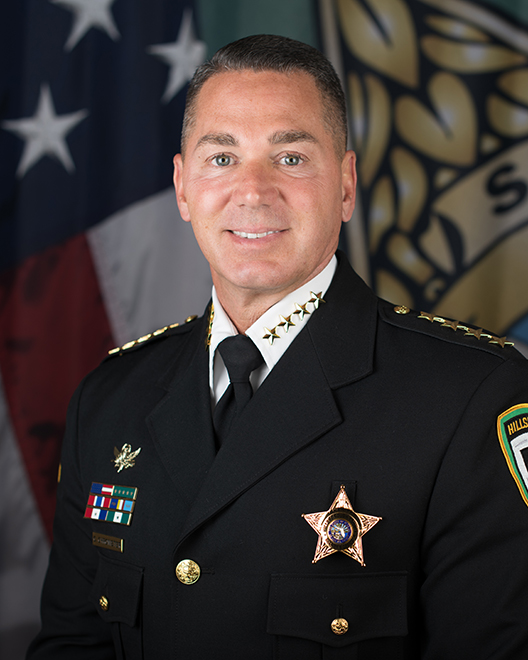
- Official portrait, 2017

30th Sheriff of Hillsborough County
- Incumbent
- Assumed office September 30, 2017
- Appointed by: Rick Scott
- Preceded by: David Gee

Personal details
- Born: 1967/1968 (age 58–59) York, Pennsylvania, U.S.
- Party: Republican
- Spouse: Teresa Card (m. 1992; div. 1995) Tammy Edwards (m. 1997; div. 1999) Nikki DeBartolo (m. 2010)
- Children: 2
- Education: St. Leo's University (BCJ, MCJ); FBI National Academy
- Occupation: Law enforcement officer; politician; SWAT operator
- Police career
- Allegiance: Hillsborough County
- Department: Hillsborough County Sheriff's Office
- Service years: 1992–present
- Rank: Sheriff

Chad Gregory Chronister (born 1967/1968) is an American law enforcement officer and politician who has served as the sheriff of Hillsborough County, Florida, since 2017. On November 30, 2024, President-elect Donald Trump announced his intention to nominate Chronister as Administrator of the Drug Enforcement Administration. He withdrew himself from consideration on December 3, 2024.

== Early life ==
Chad Chronister was born in York, Pennsylvania. His parents, Helena Bentivegna and Danny, had a daughter a year later and eventually divorced. Chronister's maternal grandfather, Jack Bentivegna, lived nearby and served as a father figure. Chronister played junior varsity football and ran track before graduating from high school in 1986. After two years at Mansfield University, where he studied business and communications, Chronister moved to Tampa. He graduated from Saint Leo University, receiving a Bachelor of Arts in criminal justice and a Master of Science in criminology. Chronister later graduated from the 260th session of the FBI National Academy.

== Career ==
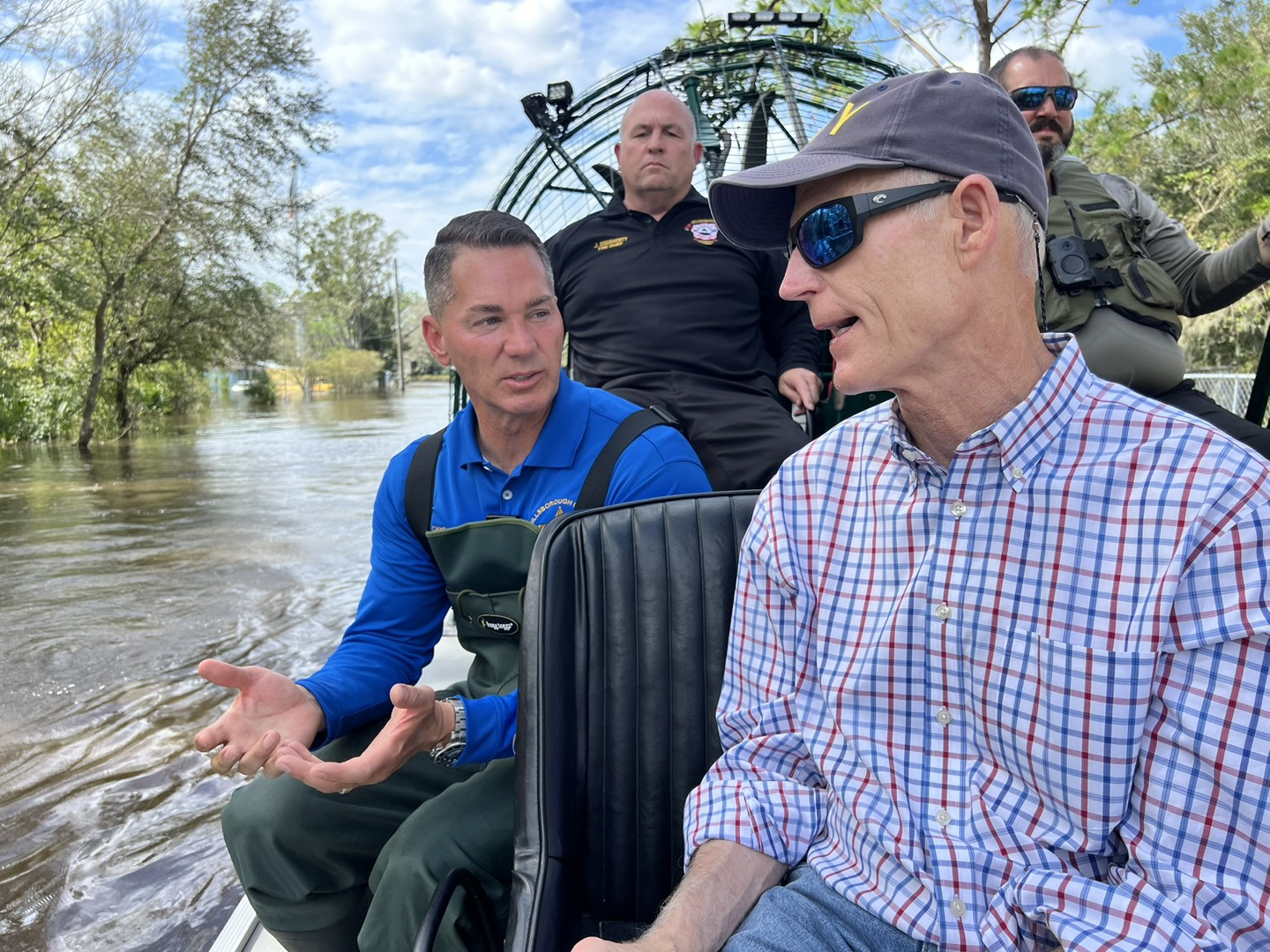
Senator Rick Scott and Chronister surveying damage in Hillsborough County after Hurricane Milton

Chronister has served in the Hillsborough County Sheriff's Office since 1992, beginning his career as a patrol deputy and SWAT operator. He then served as a detective for several units, including environmental enforcement, warrants, narcotics, and intelligence. Chronister was a supervisor in the Warrants, Narcotics, Intelligence, and Dignitary Protection Detail. He then became deputy commander of the Community Outreach Division, and later the colonel of the Department of Operation Support.

In 2017, Chronister was appointed sheriff after the unexpected retirement of his predecessor, David Gee, who recommended him. As sheriff, he is the co-chairman of the Regional Domestic Security Task Force for Region IV Tampa Bay; vice-chairman, Hillsborough County Public Safety Coordinating Council; and vice-chairman, Hillsborough County Public Schools Oversight Committee. Chronister won elections for sheriff in 2018 and 2020 and was unopposed in 2024.

In September 2020, Chronister's office publicized the names and mugshots of eleven men who were arrested in a local park on misdemeanor charges after agreeing to have sex with undercover male deputies. The focus on gay men, without prostitution or associated public complaints, brought criticism from a state LGBTQ civil rights organization and questions from experts on the subject.

On November 30, 2024, President-elect Donald Trump announced his intention to nominate Chronister as Administrator of the Drug Enforcement Administration. He withdrew himself from consideration on December 3, 2024, and Terry Cole was later selected to lead the DEA.

== Elections ==
2024 Hillsborough County Sheriff Election
Party	Candidate	Votes	%	±%
Republican	Chad Chronister (inc.)	0	100%	
Democratic	N/A	0	0%	
Republican hold				

2020 Hillsborough County Sheriff Election
Party	Candidate	Votes	%	±%
Republican	Chad Chronister (inc.)	380,977	54.80%	
Democratic	Gary Pruitt	249,382	35.87%	
No Party Affiliation (NPA)	Ron McMullen	64,850	9.33%	
Republican hold				

2018 Hillsborough County Sheriff Special Election
Party	Candidate	Votes	%	±%
Republican	Chad Chronister (inc.)	280,849	54.82%	
Democratic	Gary Pruitt	231,418	45.18%	
Republican hold				

== Personal life ==
In 1992, Chronister married Teresa Card, with whom he has a son, born in 1993. The couple divorced in 1995. In 1997, Chronister married Tammy Edwards, and they divorced in 1999. In 2010, Chronister married Nicole "Nikki" DeBartolo, the daughter of San Francisco 49ers former owner Edward J. DeBartolo Jr. Chronister became the father of Nikki's son from a prior marriage.
