= Hunters Green =

- Neighborhood
- Location within the state of Florida
- Coordinates: 28°8′11″N 82°21′7″W
- Country: United States
- State: Florida
- County: Hillsborough
- City: Tampa

Population (2010)
  - Total: 5,056
- Time zone: UTC-5 (Eastern (EST))
  - Summer (DST): UTC-4 (EDT)
- ZIP codes: 33592 and 33647

Hunters Green or Hunter's Green is a neighborhood within the city limits of Tampa, Florida. As of the 2010 census the neighborhood had a population of 5,056. The ZIP Codes serving the neighborhood are 33592 and 33647. The neighborhood is located within the district of New Tampa. The neighborhood was fully established in 1991.

== Geography ==
Hunters Green boundaries are Cross Creek Boulevard to the north, Highland Oak Drive to the east and Bruce B. Downs Boulevard to the west.

== Demographics ==
As of the census of 2010, there were 5,056 people and 1,853 households residing in the neighborhood. The population density was 2,856/mi^{2}. The racial makeup of the neighborhood was 74% White, 13% African American, 0% Native American, 7% Asian, 3% from other races, and 2% from two or more races. Hispanic or Latino of any race were 16% of the population.

There were 1,853 households, out of which 42% had children under the age of 18 living with them, 59% were married couples living together, 14% had a female householder with no husband present, and 6% were non-families. 18% of all households were made up of individuals.

In the neighborhood the population was spread out, with 29% under the age of 18, 20% from 18 to 34, 23% from 35 to 49, 20% from 50 to 64, and 8% who were 65 years of age or older. For every 100 females, there were 91.3 males.

The per capita income for the neighborhood was $39,892. About 3% of the population were below the poverty line, 15% of those are under the age of 18.

== See also ==
- Neighborhoods in Tampa, Florida
