= Versaterm =

Canadian company

Versaterm Inc.
- Founded: 1977
- Headquarters: 1331 Clyde Ave; Ottawa, Ontario; K2C 0A9
- Website: www.versaterm.com

Versaterm Inc. is a Canadian company based in Ottawa, Ontario that develops computer-aided dispatch (CAD) and records management systems for police, fire, and other public safety agencies. Former Royal Canadian Mounted Police employees established the company in 1977; the group had previously developed the Canadian Police Information Centre, a national police database. Versaterm and its rival Niche Technologies, also based in Canada, have "cornered much of the market" for records management in North American police forces, according to The Globe and Mail. Despite its dominance, many of its systems have been criticised by officers for their unwieldiness and unreliability, and several police agencies have abandoned their use.

== Products ==
=== CAD software ===
Police agencies that have employed Versaterm's CAD system include Portland, Sacramento, Salt Lake City, and Seattle. An inquiry by KXAN News into Austin's use of the system found that several critical hardware and software failures between 2008 and 2010 disabled the system for hours at a time, forcing operators to instead handwrite information when receiving emergency calls.

Portland adopted Versaterm's system in 2011, at a cost of $14.5 million. Officers made hundreds of complaints in the months following the launch; reported problems included "system-wide crashes", incorrect dispatches to calls outside officers' jurisdictions, failures in tracking officers' locations, and issues with the font size and functionality of the user interface. Agencies were also irritated by the $2.5 million annual maintenance costs they were required to contribute, and, in a "near-mutiny", some considered not paying to employ the system, due to its reported problems. However, most of the issues had been fixed by 2013, and Portland defended the launch, pointing out that issues were to be expected in such a new system. Versaterm said "very few" of the reported problems were related to its software.

=== Records management ===
Versaterm's record management software has been used by police forces from Austin, British Columbia, Minneapolis, Portland and Seattle.
