= Shops at Wiregrass =

Outdoor shopping mall in Wesley Chapel, Florida, U.S.

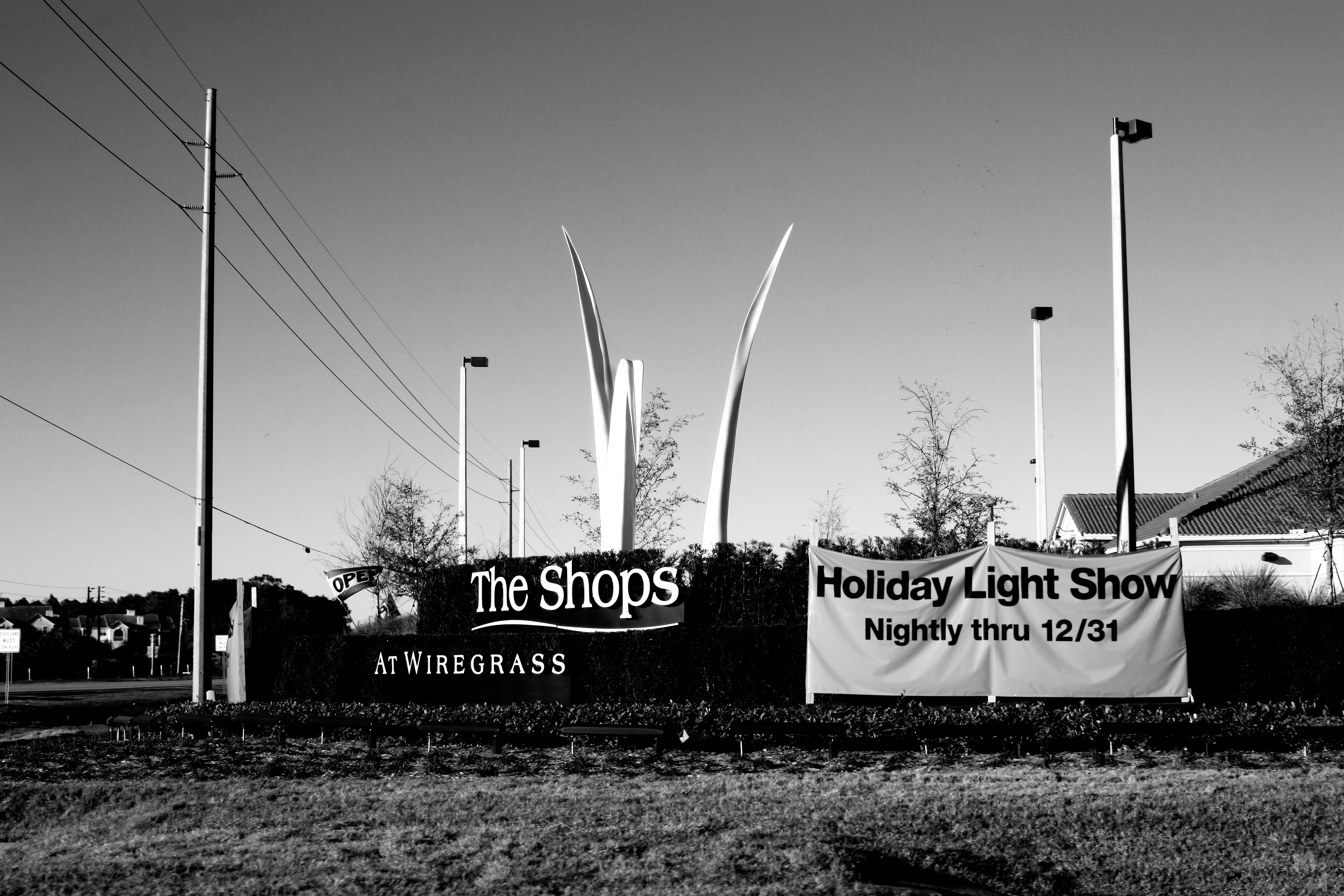
- Picture of the entrance at the Shops at Wiregrass.
- Address: 28211 Paseo Drive, Wesley Chapel, Florida
- Opened: October 30, 2008; 18 years ago
- Developer: Forest City Realty Trust
- Owner: Trigate Capital
- Floor area: 800,000 sq mi (2,100,000 km^{2})
- Floors: 2
- Public transit: Wiregrass Park N Ride (GOPASCO 52 East & West and HART 275LX)
- Website: www.theshopsatwiregrass.com

The Shops at Wiregrass is a regional outdoor shopping mall located off of interstate 75 in Wesley Chapel, Florida. The mall is owned by TriGate Capital.

The mall has 97 stores and restaurants. Anchor tenants are Macy's, JCPenney, and Dillard's and the two mini-anchors are Barnes & Noble and Pottery Barn.

== History ==
The Shops at Wiregrass opened on October 30, 2008, developed and then-owned by Forest City Realty Trust.

In 2017, the mall was sold to Queensland Investment Corporation as part of a 10-property portfolio for $3.2 billion.

In May 2023, Trigate Capital bought the Shops at Wiregrass for $70.5 million.

In 2025, initiatives were taken to attract new tenants.

In April 2026, there were 13 luxury retail shops, restaurants and beauty brands opening or expanding at the mall, including a store by Kendra Scott.

== See also ==
- Tampa Premium Outlets
