= Pebble Creek, Florida =

- Census-designated place
- Location in Hillsborough County and the state of Florida
- Coordinates: 28°09′32″N 82°20′21″W
- Country: United States
- State: Florida
- County: Hillsborough

Area
  - Total: 2.92 sq mi (7.56 km^{2})
  - Land: 2.83 sq mi (7.32 km^{2})
  - Water: 0.097 sq mi (0.25 km^{2})
- Elevation: 56 ft (17 m)

Population (2020)
  - Total: 9,624
  - Density: 3,407.2/sq mi (1,315.52/km^{2})
- Time zone: UTC-5 (Eastern (EST))
  - Summer (DST): UTC-4 (EDT)
- ZIP Code: 33647
- Area code: 813
- FIPS code: 12-55540
- GNIS feature ID: 2403403

Pebble Creek is a census-designated place (CDP) in Hillsborough County, Florida, United States. The population was 9,624 at the 2020 census, up from 7,622 at the 2010 census. Pebble Creek is located in the unincorporated portion of New Tampa, and is primarily a residential zone.

== Geography ==
Pebble Creek is located along the northern edge of Hillsborough County. It is bordered to the east, south, and west by the city of Tampa and to the north by the Wesley Chapel CDP in Pasco County. Pebble Creek is 18 miles (29 km) northeast of downtown Tampa.

According to the United States Census Bureau, the CDP has a total area of 2.9 square miles (7.5 km^{2}), of which 2.8 square miles (7.2 km^{2}) are land and 0.1 square miles (0.2 km^{2}), or 3.29%, are water.

== Demographics ==
Historical population
| Census | Pop. | Note | %± |
|---|---|---|---|
| 2000 | 4,824 | | — |
| 2010 | 7,622 | | 58.0% |
| 2020 | 9,624 | | 26.3% |

=== 2020 census ===
As of the 2020 census, Pebble Creek had a population of 9,624. The median age was 39.1 years. 25.7% of residents were under the age of 18 and 13.2% of residents were 65 years of age or older. For every 100 females there were 94.4 males, and for every 100 females age 18 and over there were 91.5 males age 18 and over.

100.0% of residents lived in urban areas, while 0.0% lived in rural areas.

There were 3,310 households in Pebble Creek, of which 41.1% had children under the age of 18 living in them. Of all households, 60.5% were married-couple households, 12.8% were households with a male householder and no spouse or partner present, and 21.1% were households with a female householder and no spouse or partner present. About 17.8% of all households were made up of individuals and 5.7% had someone living alone who was 65 years of age or older.

There were 3,448 housing units, of which 4.0% were vacant. The homeowner vacancy rate was 0.7% and the rental vacancy rate was 7.4%.

Racial composition as of the 2020 census
| Race | Number | Percent |
|---|---|---|
| White | 4,667 | 48.5% |
| Black or African American | 1,329 | 13.8% |
| American Indian and Alaska Native | 24 | 0.2% |
| Asian | 1,619 | 16.8% |
| Native Hawaiian and Other Pacific Islander | 17 | 0.2% |
| Some other race | 482 | 5.0% |
| Two or more races | 1,486 | 15.4% |
| Hispanic or Latino (of any race) | 1,919 | 19.9% |

=== 2000 census ===
As of the census of 2000, there were 4,824 people, 1,764 households, and 1,370 families residing in the community. The population density was 1,619.6 inhabitants per square mile (625.3/km^{2}). There were 1,871 housing units at an average density of 628.2 per square mile (242.5/km^{2}). The racial makeup of the community was 83.69% White, 6.09% African American, 0.21% Native American, 6.09% Asian, 0.08% Pacific Islander, 1.68% from other races, and 2.16% from two or more races. Hispanic or Latino of any race were 9.33% of the population.

There were 1,764 households, out of which 43.1% had children under the age of 18 living with them, 67.3% were married couples living together, 8.2% had a female householder with no husband present, and 22.3% were non-families. 17.4% of all households were made up of individuals, and 4.4% had someone living alone who was 65 years of age or older. The average household size was 2.73 and the average family size was 3.10.

In the community the population was spread out, with 29.2% under the age of 18, 5.9% from 18 to 24, 34.5% from 25 to 44, 22.8% from 45 to 64, and 7.5% who were 65 years of age or older. The median age was 36 years. For every 100 females, there were 94.5 males. For every 100 females age 18 and over, there were 90.0 males.

The median income for a household in the community was $68,388, and the median income for a family was $73,909. Males had a median income of $50,694 versus $39,868 for females. The per capita income for the community was $28,319. About 1.3% of families and 1.7% of the population were below the poverty line, including 2.2% of those under age 18 and none of those age 65 or over.

=== Community associations ===
Pebble Creek consists of two master HOA's, Pebble Creek Homeowners Association of Hillsborough County, Inc.(PCHOA) and Pebble Creek Village HOA(PCV). PCHOA is the larger of the two with over 1,100 homes. PCV comprises just over 300 homes. Each HOA is responsible for their own community common space. PCHOA has a community center, pool, basketball court, tennis courts and many common area play spaces. PCV has non of these nor does it have access to the amenities located in PCHOA. While the HOA dues are considerably different between the two, PCHOA is much larger with all of the amenities available to their homeowners.
