= Tampa Palms =

- Neighborhood
- Location within the state of Florida
- Coordinates: 28°5′30″N 82°22′57″W
- Country: United States
- State: Florida
- County: Hillsborough
- City: Tampa

Population (2010)
  - Total: 13,515
- Time zone: UTC-5 (Eastern (EST))
  - Summer (DST): UTC-4 (EDT)
- ZIP codes: 33613, 33617, 33637, and 33647

Tampa Palms is a neighborhood within the New Tampa district of the city of Tampa, Florida. As of the 2010 census the neighborhood had a population of 13,515. The ZIP Codes serving the neighborhood are 33613, 33617, 33637, and 33647.

== Description ==
Tampa Palms is a mixed-use planned community north of University of South Florida along the Bruce B Downs corridor. Tampa Palms has homes, shops, offices, churches, recreational facilities, schools, and restaurants. Designed by engineers Post, Buckley, Schuh & Jernigan, Tampa Palms has been awarded the Aurora Award by the Southeast Homebuilders Association and was named "the top master planned community in the US for 1987" by the National Association of Homebuilders.

Wide spine roads throughout Tampa Palms, including its 120-foot (37 m) wide Tampa Palms Boulevard, provide access without leaving home for Tampa Palms residents to shops, schools, and restaurants. Schools in this area are Chiles Elementary, Tampa Palms Elementary, Liberty Middle, Primrose School, and Freedom High.

== Geography ==
Tampa Palms boundaries are roughly the University of South Florida to the south, the University community to the southwest, Lutz to the west, and Interstate 75 to the east and north.

== Demographics ==
Source: Hillsborough County Atlas

As of the census of 2000, there were 10,159 people and 4,299 households residing in the neighborhood. The population density was 1,133/mi^{2}. The racial makeup of the neighborhood was 83% White, 8% African American, 1% Native American, 4% Asian, 2% from other races, and 2% from two or more races. Hispanic or Latino of any race were 10% of the population.

There were 4,299 households, out of which 31% had children under the age of 18 living with them, 44% were married couples living together, 8% had a female householder with no husband present, and 18% were non-families. 27% of all households were made up of individuals.

In the neighborhood the population was spread out, with 23% under the age of 18, 36% from 18 to 34, 26% from 35 to 49, 11% from 50 to 64, and 3% who were 65 years of age or older. For every 100 females, there were 102.2 males.

The per capita income for the neighborhood was $34,599. About 10% of the population were below the poverty line, 18% of those are under the age of 18.

== See also ==
- Neighborhoods in Tampa, Florida
- New Tampa
- Westchase
