= Westchase, Florida =

- Census-designated place
- Location in Hillsborough County and the state of Florida
- Coordinates: 28°03′23″N 82°37′18″W
- Country: United States
- State: Florida
- County: Hillsborough
- Established: April 15, 1991

Government
  - Type: Homeowner association
  - President: Terrence Maloney

Area
  - Total: 10.73 sq mi (27.80 km^{2})
  - Land: 9.98 sq mi (25.84 km^{2})
  - Water: 0.76 sq mi (1.96 km^{2})
- Elevation: 20 ft (6.1 m)

Population (2020)
  - Total: 25,952
  - Density: 2,601.5/sq mi (1,004.46/km^{2})
- Time zone: UTC-5 (Eastern (EST))
  - Summer (DST): UTC-4 (EDT)
- ZIP code: 33626
- Area code: 813
- FIPS code: 12-76062
- GNIS feature ID: 2403011
- Website: westchasewca.com

Westchase is a census-designated place (CDP) in Hillsborough County, Florida, United States. As of the 2020 census, Westchase had a population of 25,952. The census area encompasses most of the 33626 ZIP code area.

== Description ==
Westchase is located halfway between Tampa and Palm Harbor. Its boundaries include Oldsmar to the west, Keystone to the north, Town 'n' Country to the south, and Citrus Park to the east. The Westchase Golf Course, designed by Lloyd Clifton, is a major recreational amenity for the community. Tampa Bay Downs, a horse racetrack, is located on the area's western edge.

== History ==
Westchase was founded and constructed on April 15, 1991 with the approval of the Hillsborough County commissioners, and the area went on new development on September 15, 1991.

== Geography ==
Westchase is located in northwestern Hillsborough County about 17 miles (27 km) northwest of downtown Tampa. It is bordered to the west by Pinellas County.

According to the United States Census Bureau, the Westchase CDP has a total area of 10.7 square miles (27.8 km^{2}), of which 9.9 square miles (25.6 km^{2}) are land and 0.85 square miles (2.2 km^{2}), or 8.04%, are water.

== Demographics ==
Historical population
Census	Pop.	Note	%±
2000	11,116		—
2010	21,747		95.6%
2020	25,952		19.3%

=== 2020 census ===
As of the 2020 census, Westchase had a population of 25,952. The median age was 38.9 years. 24.7% of residents were under the age of 18 and 12.7% of residents were 65 years of age or older. For every 100 females there were 93.0 males, and for every 100 females age 18 and over there were 89.1 males age 18 and over.

100.0% of residents lived in urban areas, while 0.0% lived in rural areas.

There were 10,306 households in Westchase, of which 37.6% had children under the age of 18 living in them. Of all households, 54.1% were married-couple households, 15.1% were households with a male householder and no spouse or partner present, and 24.3% were households with a female householder and no spouse or partner present. About 24.5% of all households were made up of individuals and 8.8% had someone living alone who was 65 years of age or older.

There were 10,959 housing units, of which 6.0% were vacant. The homeowner vacancy rate was 1.3% and the rental vacancy rate was 8.6%.

Racial composition as of the 2020 census
Race	Number	Percent
White	16,596	63.9%
Black or African American	1,335	5.1%
American Indian and Alaska Native	48	0.2%
Asian	3,148	12.1%
Native Hawaiian and Other Pacific Islander	8	0.0%
Some other race	1,229	4.7%
Two or more races	3,588	13.8%
Hispanic or Latino (of any race)	4,697	18.1%

=== 2010 census ===
As of the census of 2010, there were 21,747 people living in the community. The population density was 2,203 people per square mile. The racial makeup of the community was 82.5% White, 5.3% African American, 0.2% Native American, 6.6% Asian, 0.01% Pacific Islander, and 3% from two or more races. Hispanic or Latino of any race were 15.5% of the population.

There were 9,244 households in Westchase. The average household size was 2.55.

The median income for a household in the community was $88,964. The median home value was $326,200.

=== Community association ===
The Westchase Community Association is the largest deed-restricted community (homeowner association) within the Westchase census-designated place. The community is organized into 28 neighborhoods, or villages. Some of these villages are organized into even smaller subsections. Each of these villages and their "sub-villages" are represented by a voting member and at least one alternate who are elected annually by the residents of a particular neighborhood. Some of the villages also have a website that is maintained by a "village webmaster". Residents are encouraged to participate by attending website committee meetings or providing material to help improve the website to the webmaster.

=== Community development districts ===
Westchase was established with two Community Development Districts (CDDs). CDDs are statutorily created governmental entities charged with the task of maintaining the common areas of planned communities. In September 2011, the two CDDs agreed to merge. The state approved the merger and it became effective October 1, 2011.

=== The villages ===
- Abbotsford
- Arlington Park
- Bennington
- Berkeley Square
- Brentford
- The Bridges
- Castleford
- Chelmsford
- Classic Townhomes of West Park Village
- Enclave
- The Fords
- Glencliff
- Glenfield
- The Greens
- Harbor Links/Estates
- Keswick Forest
- Kingsford
- Radcliffe
- Saville Rowe
- The Shires
- West Park Village-Single Family Homes
- Reserve at West Park Village
- Stamford
- Townhomes of West Park Village
- Traditional Townhomes of West Park Village
- Village Green
- Villas of West Park Village
- Vineyards
- Woodbay
- Worthington
- Wycliff
- Windsor Place

=== West Park Village ===
West Park Village, with two town centers, is a walkable mixed-use area in Westchase with shops, bars, restaurants and village greens, as well as condos, townhomes, houses, and apartments with varied resident ages. West Park Village has a distinct look which was inspired by historic Hyde Park in South Tampa. The area has a summer concert series, nightly specials at the different village restaurants, and an annual pub crawl. Westchase ranked as the 26th coolest suburb in the United States worth a visit by Travel + Leisure magazine.

== See also ==
- Carrollwood (CDP), Florida
- Hyde Park (Tampa)
- New Tampa
- Tampa Palms
