= RV1 =

RV1 may refer to:

- Chrysler RV1 Valiant, a passenger car
- London Buses route RV1
- Mandala 1, the first mandala of the Rigveda
- RV-1 Mohawk, a reconnaissance aircraft
- RV-1 nuclear reactor, a Venezuelan research reactor
- Toyota RV-1, a concept vehicle
- VanGrunsven RV-1, a homebuilt aircraft
- Sonata No. 6 in A Major, RV 1, from Antonio Vivaldi's Twelve Trio Sonatas, Op. 2
