= Sederrik Cunningham =

American gridiron football player (born 1989)

No. 89, 82
- Position: Wide receiver

Personal information
- Born: July 14, 1989 (age 37); Zephyrhills, Florida, U.S.
- Listed height: 5 ft 11 in (1.80 m)
- Listed weight: 200 lb (91 kg)

Career information
- High school: Zephyrhills (FL)
- College: Furman

Career history
- 2013: Green Bay Packers
- 2014–2015: Calgary Stampeders
- 2015: Edmonton Eskimos

Awards and highlights
- 2× Grey Cup champion (2014, 2015)
- Stats at Pro Football Reference
- Stats at CFL.ca (archive)

Sederrik Cunningham (born July 14, 1989) is an American former professional football wide receiver. Cunningham played college football at Furman University. He was a member of the Green Bay Packers, Calgary Stampeders and Edmonton Eskimos.

== Early life and college ==
Cunningham attended Zephyrhills High School in Zephyrhills, Florida. He played college football for the Furman Paladins from 2008 to 2011, catching 95 passes for 1,196 yards and 7 touchdowns in 44 games.

== Professional career ==
Cunningham was signed by the Green Bay Packers of the National Football League on April 15, 2013. He spent the 2013 season on injured reserve. He was released by the Packers on April 11, 2014. Cunningham signed with the Calgary Stampeders of the Canadian Football League (CFL) on May 8, 2014. He made his CFL debut on July 12, 2014. He was released by the Stampeders on July 21, 2015. On September 15, 2015, Cunningham was signed to the practice roster of the Edmonton Eskimos of the CFL. He was promoted to the active roster on October 2 and added back to the practice roster on October 8, 2015. He was released by the team on May 28, 2016. Cunningham participated in The Spring League in 2017.

== Coaching career ==
Cunningham later became the pass game coordinator for Prince George Kodiaks.
