= Steve Marshall (magician) =

American magician, clown, writer and artist

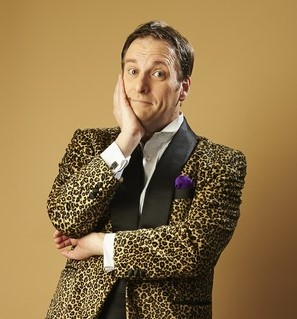
Magician Steve Marshall

Steve Marshall is a Tokyo-based magician, clown, writer and artist who performs in English and Japanese. Marshall became interested in magic at age eight when he received a Marshall Brodien TV Magic Set for Christmas. In 1983 Marshall attended the Ringling Bros. and Barnum & Bailey Clown College in Venice, Florida. Upon graduation, he was one of only eleven students to receive a performing contract to tour with The Greatest Show on Earth.

Sayonara to Hello is a documentary film covering one of his monthlong American tours. He is from Zephyrhills, Florida and graduated from Zephyrhills High School. He is married with two daughters.

As an artist, Marshall was one of 73 global artists to be chosen to design and paint a life-sized cow statue of the Tokyo installation of the international art exhibition of the "CowParade" in 2008. He is the designer and creator of "Producer's Puzzle", the annual award given to the Broadway Global Producer of the year since its inception in 2012.

In September 2017, Marshall performed on the show Penn & Teller: Fool Us, but failed to fool the hosts.
