= KZPH =

KZPH may refer to:

- KKWN, a radio station (106.7 FM) licensed to serve Cashmere, Washington, United States, which held the call sign KZPH from February 1991 to January 2008
- The ICAO code for Zephyrhills Municipal Airport in Zephyrhills, Florida, United States
