= Ja'Quan Sheppard =

American football player (born 2000)

Profile
- Position: Defensive back

Personal information
- Born: April 2, 2000 (age 26); Zephyrhills, Florida, U.S.
- Listed height: 6 ft 2 in (1.88 m)
- Listed weight: 199 lb (90 kg)

Career information
- High school: Zephyrhills (Zephyrhills, Florida)
- College: Cincinnati (2019–2022); Maryland (2023)
- NFL draft: 2024: undrafted

Career history
- Las Vegas Raiders (2024)*; Memphis Showboats (2025); Houston Roughnecks (2025)
- * Offseason or practice squad member only

Awards and highlights
- First-team All-AAC (2022)
- Stats at Pro Football Reference

Ja'Quan Sheppard (born April 2, 2000) is an American professional football defensive back. He played college football at Maryland and Cincinnati.

== Early life ==
Sheppard grew up in Zephyrhills, Florida, and attended Zephyrhills High School. In his high school career, Sheppard made 66 total tackles (42 solo and 24 assisted) and one tackle for loss. Sheppard also had six interceptions for eight yard, 21 pass breakups, and a fumble recovery, while playing in a total of 44 games. He was a three-star rated recruit and committed to play college football at the University of Cincinnati over offers from Kentucky, Marshall, UMass, NC State, Samford, South Alabama, Southern Miss, Temple, Tennessee State, Toledo, Troy, Tulane, USF, Western Kentucky and Western Michigan.

== College career ==
=== Cincinnati ===
During Sheppard's true freshman season in 2019, he played in nine games while mostly being on special teams. He finished the season with six total tackles (four solo and two assisted). During the 2020 season, he played in eight games as a special teamer and defensive back reserve. He finished the season with five total tackles (four solo and one assisted) and one tackle for loss. During the 2021 season, he appeared in nine games while on special teams and as a backup defensive back. He finished the season with three total tackles (two solo and one assisted). During the 2022 season, he played in 12 games, finishing the season with 50 total tackles (33 solo and 17 assisted), 4.5 tackles for loss for 16 yards, one sack for 13 yards and 10 pass breakups.

On December 5, 2022, he announced that he would enter the transfer portal.

=== Maryland ===
On December 11, 2022, Sheppard announced that he would transfer to Maryland.

During the 2023 season, he played in and started all 13 games, finishing the season with 31 total tackles (28 solo and three assisted), three tackles for loss for 14 yards, one sack for seven yards and eight pass breakups.

== Professional career ==
Pre-draft measurables
Height	Weight	Arm length	Hand span	40-yard dash	10-yard split	20-yard split	20-yard shuttle	Vertical jump	Broad jump
6 ft 1 3/4 in (1.87 m)	199 lb (90 kg)	30 7/8 in (0.78 m)	9 1/4 in (0.23 m)	4.67 s	1.57 s	2.70 s	4.40 s	33 in (0.84 m)	10 ft 0 in (3.05 m)
All values from Pro Day

=== Las Vegas Raiders ===
After not being selected in the 2024 NFL draft, Sheppard signed with the Las Vegas Raiders as an undrafted free agent on April 27, 2024. He was also selected by the Memphis Showboats in the eighth round of the 2024 UFL draft on July 17. He was waived on August 27.

=== Memphis Showboats ===
On December 6, 2024, Sheppard signed with the Memphis Showboats of the United Football League (UFL). He was released on April 28, 2025.

=== Houston Roughnecks ===
Sheppard was claimed off waivers by the Houston Roughnecks on April 28, 2025.
