= Sayonara to Hello =

Sayonara to Hello is a 2012 American documentary film by Nic Beery about an American magician who becomes famous in Japan. The film follows Zephyrhills, Florida native Steve Marshall, a former Ringling Bros. and Barnum & Bailey Circus clown on a monthlong tour from Florida to New York.
