= Zephyrhills Museum of Military History =

Military Museum in Zephyrhills, Florida

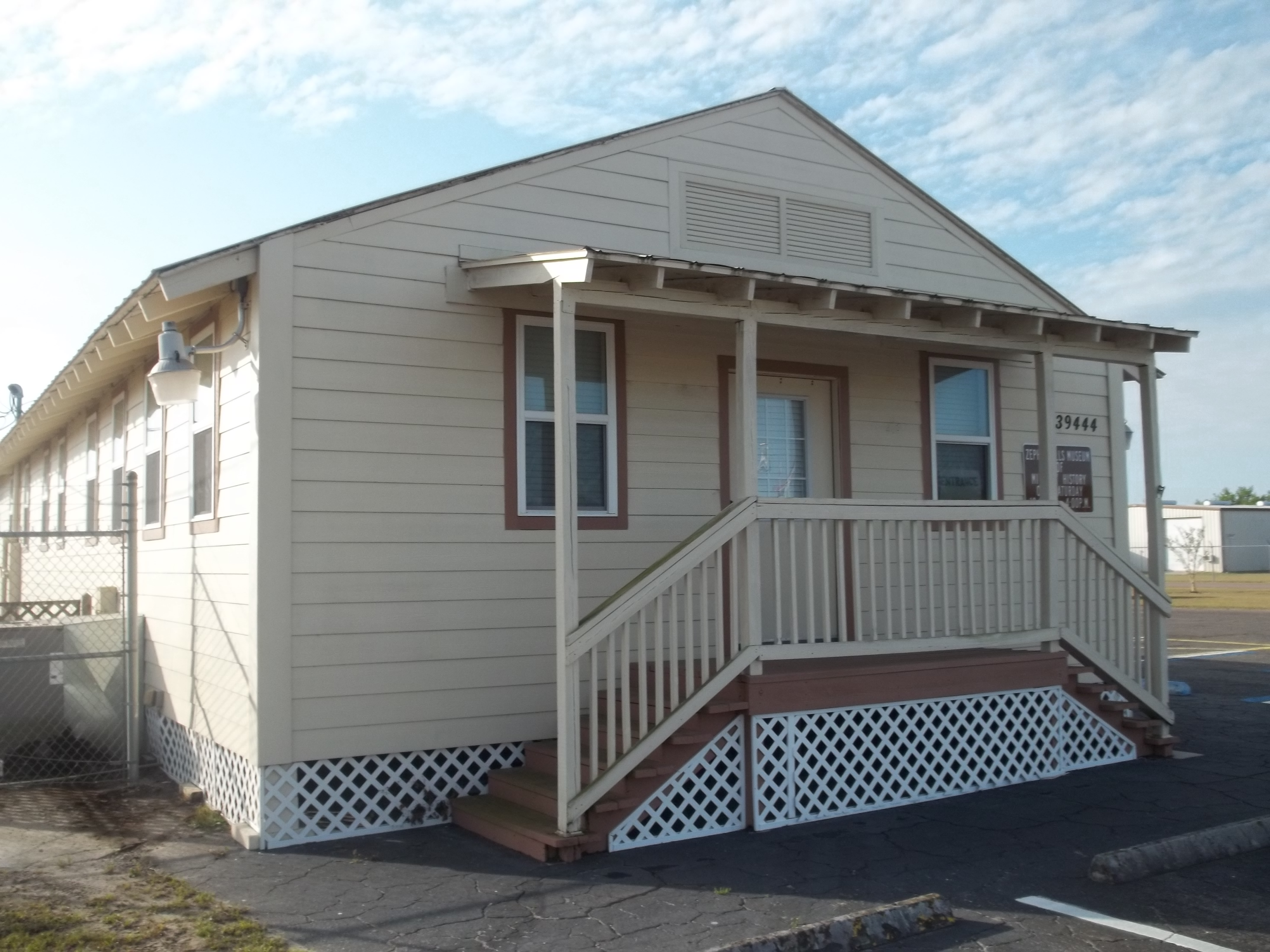

- Location within Florida Location within the United States
- Established: 2001
- Location: 39444 South Ave; Zephyrhills, Florida
- Coordinates: 28.2306736°N 82.1635218°W
- Type: History
- President: Cliff Moffett
- Parking: On site
- Website: zmmh.org

Zephyrhills Museum of Military History is a history museum located in Zephyrhills, Florida. The museum is located at the Zephyrhills Municipal Airport, and is a renovated infirmary from World War II.

The Museum is operated by the Zephyrhills Museum of Military History, Inc. which is a non-profit organization, and all workers at the museum are volunteers.

The museum has over 1200 artifacts from the American Civil War, World War I, World War II, the Korean War, the Vietnam War, and the September 11 attacks. Some items from the museum are several aircraft, uniforms, weapons, and wartime supplies.

== History ==
The museums building was used as an infantry barracks in World War II. The museum is located in the former airfield of the Zephyrhills Army Airfield, which is now a public airport. The airfield was in use from January 1943 to January 1944, where 500 men from the Army's 10th Fighter Squadron were stationed to train. when it was decommissioned and given to the city of Zephyrhills, when it was turned into a public airport. All of the barracks for the airfield were demolished, with the only surviving building being the infirmary.

It stayed abandoned until 1997–2001, where state and city grants were given to restore the infirmary. in 2001, the museum opened to the public.

== Exhibits ==
There are several exhibits in the museum dedicated to different groups and wars the United States fought or had. Their exhibits include:

=== 10th Fighter Squadron exhibit ===
The exhibit has many kinds of artifacts, such as a photo taken in 1945 of the 10th Fighter Squadron.

=== Other exhibits ===
- World War I Exhibit
- World War II Exhibits
- Korean War Exhibit
- Vietnam War Exhibit
- Women in the Military Exhibit
- US Navy Exhibit
- Civil War Exhibit
- 9/11 Exhibit

== Collection ==
The museum has many different items from the several wars. Many of the items came from veterans in the city who donated them, and aircraft that were loaned to the museum. Some notable items from the museum include:

=== 1959 Grumman OV-1B Mohawk ===
The Grumman OV-1B Mohawk (Serial No. 59-2631) was developed by the United States Army to carry eighteen-foot Side Looking Airborne Radar, while also having photographic surveillance capabilities. The aircraft was loaned to the museum on May 17, 2022, though the aircraft is not airworthiness.

=== 26-Foot Motor Whaleboat MK 10 ===
The 26-Foot Motor Whaleboat MK 10 was a boat used by the United States Navy.

=== Bell OH-58A Kiowa ===
The Bell OH-58A Kiowa (Serial No. 70-15423) was a helicopter developed for the United States Army.

=== Douglass C-53D Skytrooper ===
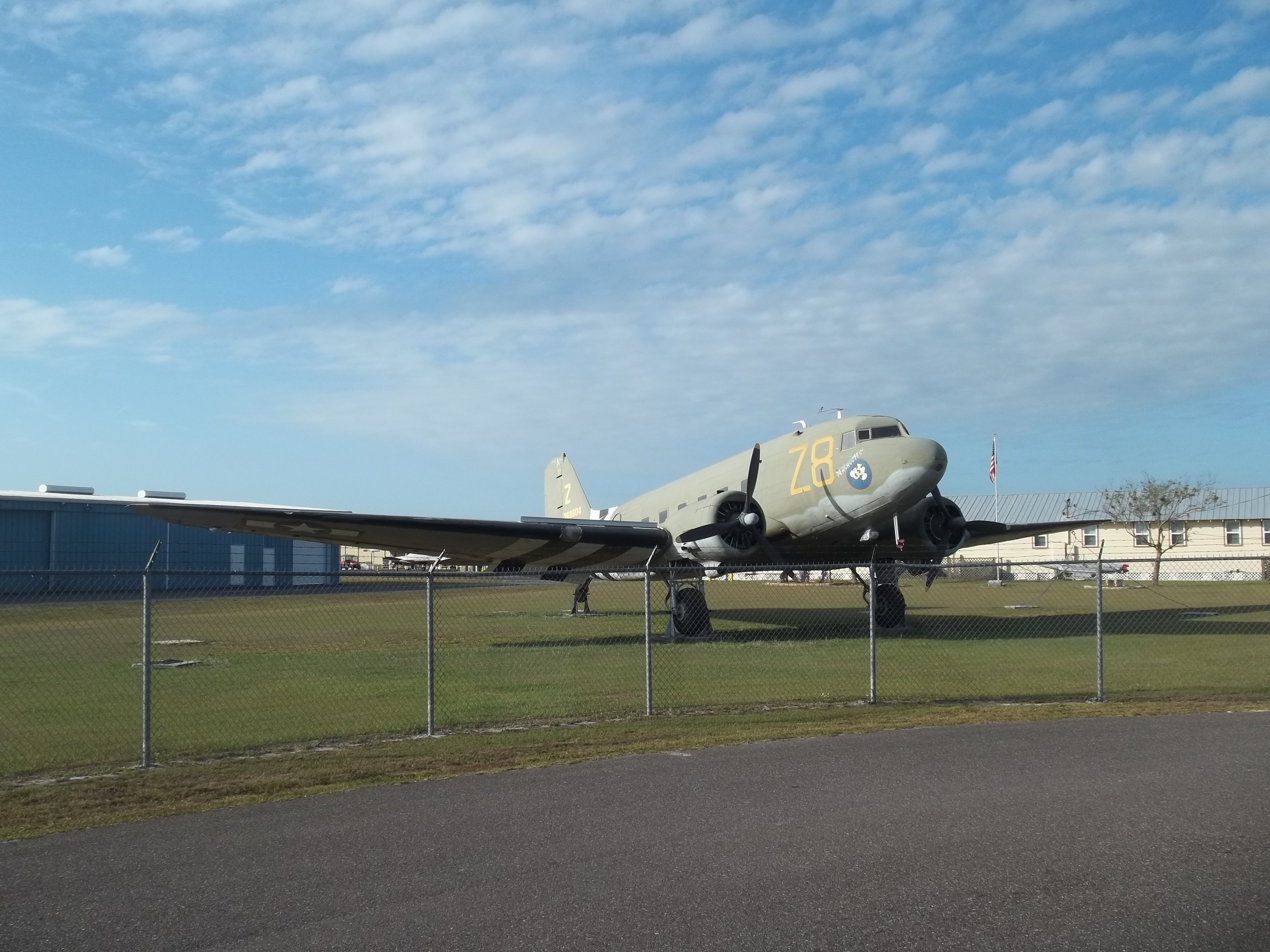
The Douglass C-53D Skytrooper displayed at the museum.

The Douglas C-53D Skytrooper was an aircraft used by the former United States Army Air Forces. The main purpose of the aircraft was troop transport and for paratroopers.

== See also ==
- List of museums in Florida
- Zephyrhills Municipal Airport
- Zephyrhills, Florida
