= Zephyrhills High School =

Public high school in Zephyrhills, Florida, USA

Coordinates: 28.249422°N 82.180134°W

Location
- 6335 12th Street; Zephyrhills, Florida 33542; United States

Information
- School type: Public
- Established: 1910; 116 years ago
- School district: Pasco County Schools
- Principal: Amanda McCoy
- Teaching staff: 78.60 (FTE)
- Grades: 9–12
- Gender: Mixed
- Enrollment: 1,656 (2024-2025)
- Average class size: 30
- Student to teacher ratio: 21.07
- Campus size: Small (Suburb)
- Campus type: Closed
- Color
- Mascot: Bulldog
- Accreditation: AdvancED
- Newspaper: The Paw Print
- Website: zhs.pasco.k12.fl.us

Zephyrhills High School is a public high school in Zephyrhills, Florida, United States. It is one of fifteen public high schools in the District School Board of Pasco County. ZHS athletic teams compete as the Bulldogs.

== History ==
Zephyrhills High School was created from the consolidations of one-room schools in the Zephyrhills area. Students at the former Union, Childers, and Independence schools were consolidated into the new Zephyrhills school, which was located at the corner of Seventh Avenue and Sixth Street. The new school opened in September 1910. The first principal was Judge J.W. Sanders, who later became the superintendent of Pasco County Schools.

In 1913, the school held its first commencement ceremony for seniors, although 11 juniors were graduated from the high school the prior year. Graduating seniors in 1919 were addressed by Dr. Edward Conradi, President of what was then the Florida State College for Women (and is now Florida State University).

A fire in 1926 destroyed the original Zephyrhills High School. A new building was constructed at 10th Avenue and 10th Street at the cost of fifty thousand dollars and was dedicated on September 10, 1926. This building was damaged by fire in 1935, and was closed. For the next two years, classes were held in local businesses, including a bakery. The renovated school was opened in 1937, and was dedicated as a project of the Works Projects Administration. This building later became part of Raymond B Stewart Middle School, and as of 2014 houses that school's administration.

The first athletic teams from Zephyrhills High School were called the Zephyrs. (The Bulldogs name would be adopted later.) Early rivals for the Zephyrs included their current archrival, Pasco High School from nearby Dade City. Also playing the Zephyrs in the 1930s was Brandon High School in Brandon, a town east of Tampa that today is a large suburb of that city. In 1941, Zephyrhills High School fielded their first football team. One of the students on that first team was Richard Kelly, who would serve as a Member of the US House of Representatives for Florida's 5th congressional district from 1975 until he failed his bid for renomination in the midst of the Abscam scandal in 1981.

In 1964, Zephyrhills High School won its first Florida state championship in basketball. The Bulldogs, as they by then had become known, went to the state tournament for basketball five times during a seven-year period in the 1960s, and won the state championship three times in those years.

In 1970, Zephyrhills High School was desegregated. In response to this and the phenomenal growth of the Zephyrhills area, a new high school was built in the "Hercules Tract" on 12th Street at the cost of three million dollars. The new school opened in April 1975.

In 2012, the Principal of Zephyrhills High School, Steve Van Gorden, resigned amid allegations of sexual harassment. Van Gorden was also the Mayor of Zephyrhills, and earlier had resigned that position.

== Extracurricular activities ==
Student groups and activities at Zephyrhills include band, book club, chess club, DOGO, FBLA, Family, Career, and Community Leaders of America, French National Honor Society, Gay–straight alliance, hacky sack club, Health Occupations Students of America, Illusions club, Infusion dance club, Interact, iWait, Japanese Culture Outreach Society, Jaw Droppers, JROTC, Key Club, National Art Honor Society, National Honor Society, ping-pong club, Rho Kappa, Students Against Destructive Decisions, science club, Scrabble club, scrapbook club, Special Olympics, step dancing, student council, UNO Club, Super Teams, thespians/drama club, Tri-M, ultimate Frisbee club, and Voices United/Unity Day.

== Notable alumni ==
- Austin Adams, baseball player
- Sederrik Cunningham, football player
- Dave Eiland, pitching coach for the Kansas City Royals, New York Yankees and former MLB pitcher
- Dave Huppert, former professional baseball player with the Milwaukee Brewers; current manager of the Lakeland Flying Tigers
- Richard Kelly, Member of the US House of Representatives for Florida's 5th congressional district, 1975-1981
- Steve Marshall, magician
- DJ Pickett, college football cornerback for the LSU Tigers
- Ryan Pickett, defensive tackle for the Green Bay Packers
- David Reutimann, NASCAR driver
- Ja'Quan Sheppard, NFL defensive back for the Las Vegas Raiders
- Randy Maggard, Member of the Florida House of Representatives
- Danny Burgess, Florida State Senator
