= Bobby Geudert =

American soccer goalkeeper

Personal information
- Full name: Robert Geudert
- Date of birth: April 9, 1900
- Place of birth: United States
- Date of death: December 1984 (aged 84)
- Place of death: Zephyrhills, Florida, United States
- Position: Goalkeeper

Senior career*
Years	Team	Apps	(Gls)
–1924	New York F.C.		
1924–1927	New York Giants	76	(0)
1926	→ Brooklyn Wanderers (loan)	1	(0)
1927–1928	Bethlehem Steel	13	(0)
1928–1929	New York Celtic	4	(0)
- * Club domestic league appearances and goals

Robert Geudert was an American soccer goalkeeper who played in the National Association Football League, the first American Soccer League and the Eastern Professional Soccer League.

Geudert's early career is unknown, but by 1921, he was playing for New York F.C. in the National Association Football League. In 1922, New York became an inaugural member of the American Soccer League and Geurdert established himself as a regular, first-team goalkeeper. In 1924, Guerdert move to the New York Giants where he played for three seasons. During the 1925–1926 season, he went on loan to the Brooklyn Wanderers for one game. In August 1927, Bethlehem Steel F.C. signed Geudert as backup to Dave Edwards. After Edwards was injured in October, Geudert saw time in thirteen games. In the fall of 1928, Geudert moved to Celtic where he finished his professional career.

== Career stats ==
Club	Season	League	League		Challenge Cup		League Cup		Total	
Club	Season	League	Apps	Goals	Apps	Goals	Apps	Goals	Apps	Goals
New York	1920-21	NAFBL								
New York	1921-22	ASL	21	0	1	0	0	0	22	0
New York	1922-23	ASL	23	0	5	0	0	0	28	0
New York	1923-24	ASL	26	0	4	0	0	0	30	0
New York F.C. total										
New York Giants	1924-25	ASL	38	0	0	0	0	0	38	0
New York Giants	1925-26	ASL	20	0	3	0	3	0	26	0
New York Giants	1926-27	ASL	18	0	1	0	0	0	19	0
New York Giants total			76	0	4	0	3	0	83	0
Bethlehem Steel	1928-29	ASL	13	0	0	0	0	0	13	0
New York Celtic	1928-29	EPSL	4	0	0	0	0	0	0	0
Career total										
