= Grumman OV-1 Mohawk =

Battlefield reconnaissance and forward air control aircraft

OV-1 Mohawk
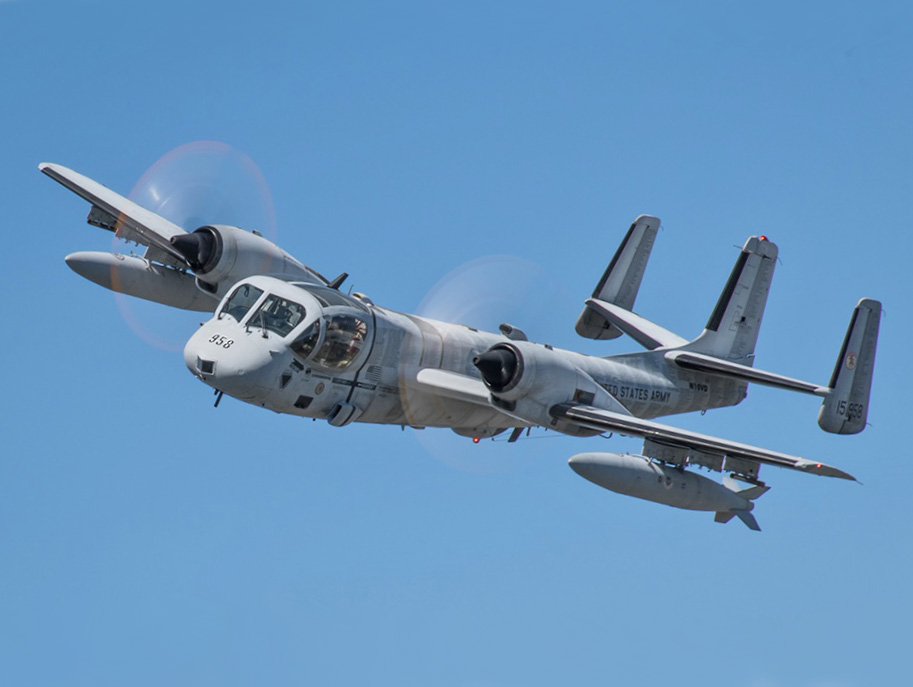
- US Army OV-1D Mohawk

General information
- Type: Light attack and observation aircraft
- National origin: United States
- Manufacturer: Grumman
- Status: Retired
- Primary users: United States Army Argentine Army Aviation
- Number built: 380

History
- Manufactured: 1959–1970
- Introduction date: October 1959
- First flight: 14 April 1959
- Retired: 1996 (United States); 2015 (Argentina)

The Grumman OV-1 Mohawk is an American armed military observation and attack aircraft that was designed for battlefield surveillance, light strike and transport capabilities. It features a twin turboprop configuration, and carries two crew members in side-by-side seating. The aircraft was intended to operate from short, unimproved runways in support of the United States Army maneuver forces.

== Development ==
Overview of the OV-1 Mohawk (1960)

The OV-1 Mohawk's SLAR capabilities

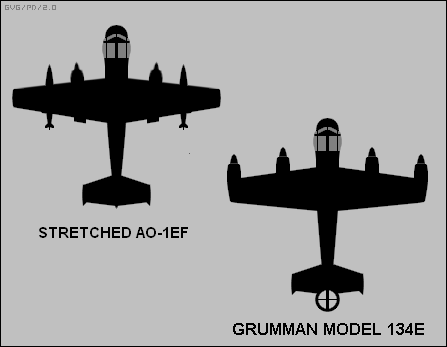
Proposed variants of the OV-1

The Mohawk began as a joint Army-Marine program through the then-Navy Bureau of Aeronautics (BuAer), for an observation/attack plane that would outperform the Cessna L-19 Bird Dog. In June 1956, the Army issued Type Specification TS145, which called for the development and procurement of a two-seat, twin turboprop aircraft designed to operate from small, unimproved fields under all weather conditions. It would be faster, with greater firepower, and heavier armour than the Bird Dog, which had proved vulnerable during the Korean War. The Mohawk's mission would include observation, artillery spotting, air control, emergency resupply, naval target spotting, liaison, and radiological monitoring. The Navy specified that the aircraft must be capable of operating from small "jeep" escort carriers. The DoD selected Grumman Aircraft Corporation's G-134 design as the winner of the competition in 1957. Marine requirements contributed an unusual feature to the design. As originally proposed, the OF-1 could be fitted with water skis that would allow the aircraft to land at sea and taxi to island beaches at 20 knots (37 km/h). Since the Marines were authorized to operate fixed-wing aircraft in the close air support (CAS) role, the mockup also featured underwing pylons for rockets, bombs, and other stores.

The Air Force disliked the armament capability of the Mohawk and tried to get it removed, while the Marines did not want the Army's sophisticated sensors. However the Navy then opted to spend the allocated budget on a fleet oil tanker instead, so the Marines dropped out of the program in September 1957. The Army continued with armed Mohawks and developed cargo pods that could be dropped from underwing hard points to resupply troops in emergencies.

The radar imaging capability of the Mohawk was proven to be a significant advancement in both peace and war times. The Side-Looking Airborne Radar (SLAR) could look through foliage and map terrain, presenting the observer with a film image of the earth below only minutes after the area was scanned. In military operations, the image was split in two parts, one showing fixed terrain features, the other spotting moving targets.

The prototype (YAO-1AF) made its maiden flight on 14 April 1959. The OV-1 entered production in October 1959.

In mid-1961, the first Mohawks to serve with U.S. forces overseas were delivered to the 7th Army at Sandhofen Airfield near Mannheim, Germany. Before its formal acceptance, the camera-carrying AO-1AF was flown by Ralph Donnell on a tour of 29 European airfields to display it to the U.S. Army field commanders and potential European customers. In addition to their Vietnam and European service, SLAR-equipped Mohawks began operational missions in 1963 patrolling the Korean Demilitarized Zone. Germany and France showed early interest in the Mohawk, and Grumman actually signed a license production agreement with the French manufacturer Breguet Aviation in exchange for American rights to the Atlantic maritime patrol aircraft.

The very nature of the joint Army/Marine program had forced design compromises, such as ejection seats, that made the aircraft expensive and, sometimes, an openly resisted item in Army budgets. Orders for the OV-1 stopped in Fiscal 1964, and the controversy in the Pentagon over the armed Mohawk peaked with a 1965 directive that prohibited the Army from operating armed fixed-wing aircraft (See the Johnson-McConnell agreement of 1966). Operational success in Vietnam led to additional Mohawk orders in 1966, and by 1968, five surveillance companies were operating in Southeast Asia.

The last of the Mohawk versions to enter production was the OV-1D with more powerful T53-L-701 engines, improved avionics, and interchangeable mission pallets that made it possible to switch the aircraft from infrared to SLAR configuration in about an hour. The first four OV-1Ds were prototypes converted from earlier production airframes, and the first flew in 1969. These were followed by 37 new-build aircraft, the last of which was delivered in December 1970.

Over the years, the mission and the aircraft underwent many changes and roughly 380 were built over all variants. Mohawk variants included the JOV-1 [armed reconnaissance], OV-1A, [visual and photographic], OV-1B [visual, photographic, and side-looking radar (SLAR) pod], the OV-1C [visual, photographic, and infrared], and the OV-1D (SLAR pod and bigger wings), OV-1E [enlarged fuselage for more sensor operators or cargo], EV-1E [special electronic intelligence installation] and RV-1E [advanced ELINT reconnaissance]. A four-engined Model 134E with tiltwings and tail ducted fan for control for VTOL was proposed to the Army but not built. Model 134R was a tandem cockpit version offered to meet the Light Armed Reconnaissance Aircraft (LARA) requirement, but the NA300 was chosen instead becoming the OV-10.

== Operational history ==
=== United States Army ===
In September 1962 the 23rd Special Warfare Aviation Detachment was deployed to South Vietnam to provide air surveillance and to serve as a test unit for operational evaluation conducted by the Army Concept Team in Vietnam. Besides its headquarters and photo processing section, there were three flight teams, each consisting of two armed Mohawks, four pilots, and seven enlisted maintenance and armament specialists. Visual and photographic reconnaissance produced a wealth of intelligence for supported units.

During the Vietnam War, 65 aircraft were lost to accidents and ground fire. In early 1968, while flying an OV-1 over South Vietnam, U.S. Army Captain Ken Lee shot down a MiG-17 "Fresco" fighter jet with his XM14 .50 in. (12.7 mm) caliber gun pods as well as two M159 unguided rocket pods, becoming the only Army aviator to ever down a MiG. Due to the Key West Agreement, the Army tried to keep the shootdown a secret for fear that it would allow the USAF to transfer Mohawks to its inventory. Lee's kill was finally formally recognized by the Army in 2007.

Starting in 1972, the Army National Guard (ARNG) began to receive the Mohawk, with the ARNG eventually operating thirteen OV-1Bs, twenty-four OV-1Cs, and sixteen OV-1Ds serving with three aviation units in Georgia and Oregon. The Oregon Army National Guard Unit operating the Mohawk was located at McNary Field in Oregon, initially as the 1042nd Military Intelligence Company (Aerial Surveillance), then reflagged as the 641st Military Intelligence Battalion (CEWI)(Aerial Exploitation).

The Army also used the aircraft during Operation Desert Storm.

U.S. Army OV-1s were retired from Europe in 1992, from South Korea in September 1996, and finally in the United States in 1996, superseded by newer systems, newer aircraft, and the evolution of reconnaissance satellites. The OV-1 was primarily replaced by the EO-5C, a militarized version of the de Havilland Canada Dash 7 turboprop airliner equipped with a SLAR system, until the U.S. Air Force's Northrop Grumman E-8 Joint STARS (Joint Surveillance Target Attack Radar System) aircraft became fully operational.

As of 2011, Alliant Techsystems partnered with the Broadbay Group and Mohawk Technologies of Florida in a venture to return an armed, modernized version of the OV-1D to operational use as a counter-insurgency aircraft. A demonstrator was equipped with a FLIR Star Safire turret and a ventral, trainable M230 chain gun.

=== Argentine Army ===
The Argentine Army Aviation received twenty-three OV-1s in the 1990s. Ten were operational and the rest were used for spare parts. They became inactive and retired from use in 2015.

== Accidents and incidents ==
On 1 November 2019, a Grumman OV-1D Mohawk operated by Mohawk Airshows crashed at Witham Field, Stuart, Florida, during the Stuart Air Show. The aircraft was destroyed and the pilot was killed. Its serial number was 68-15958.

On 14 January 1981, a Grumman OV-1D Mohawk crashed and burned in a rural area near Lampasas, Texas during a maintenance test flight out of Fort Hood, Texas for engine rigging and nose gear strut replacement. The Inertial Navigation System had stretched a wire/pulled a pin at a computer connector and the pin re-locked. Pilot CW3 Sandy L. Oliphant and SSG Roger A. Meadows were killed instantly.

== Variants ==
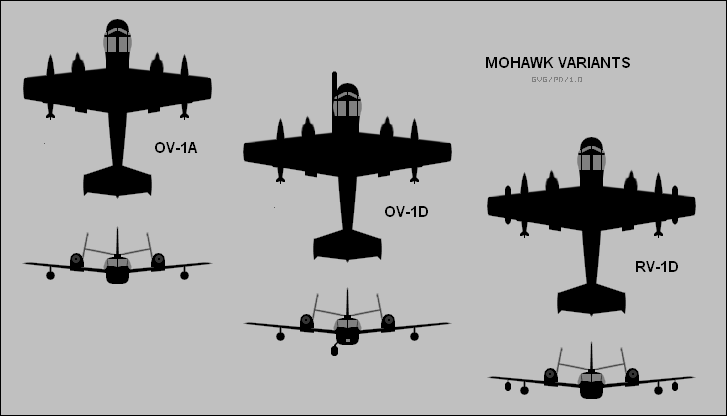
OV-1 Mohawk variants

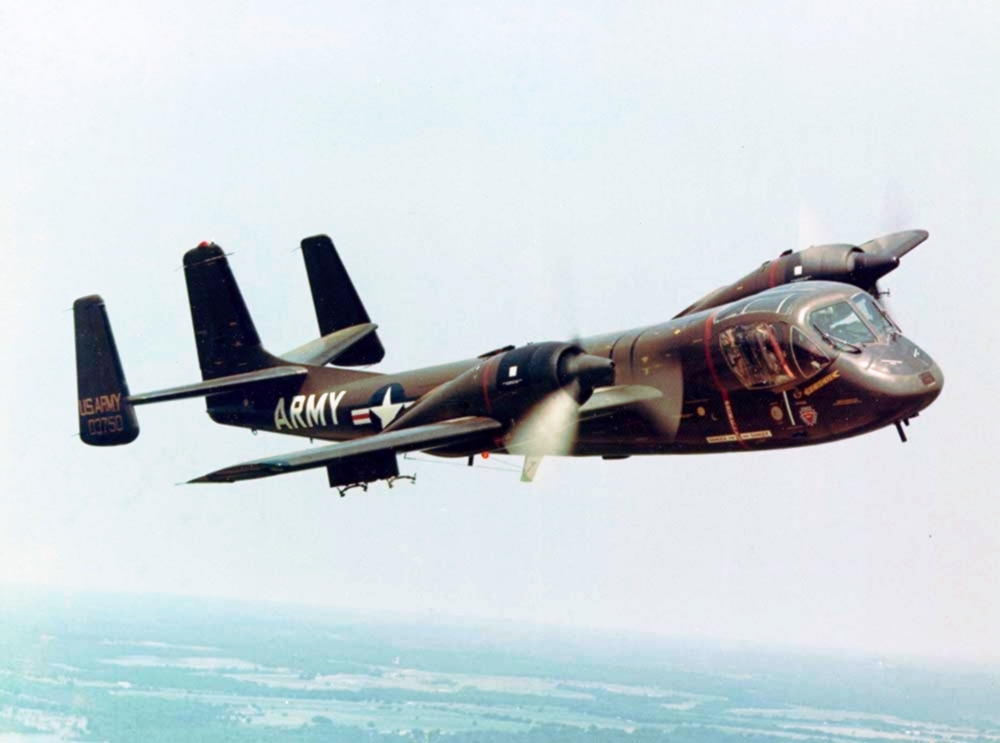
OV-1A Mohawk

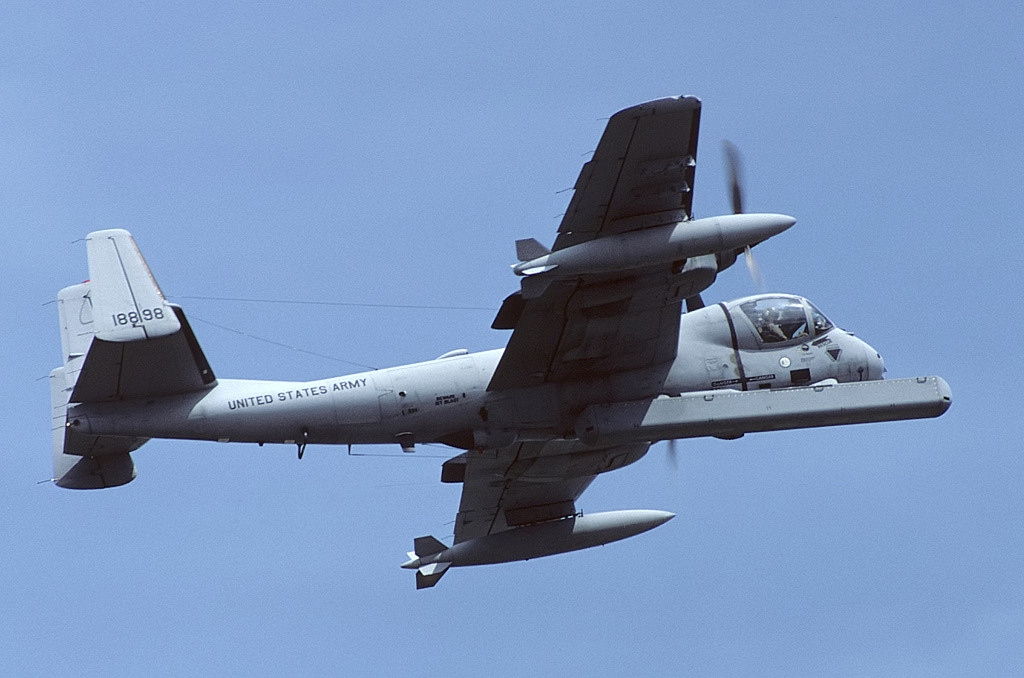
OV-1D Mohawk SLAR variant

YAO-1 (YOV-1A)
Initial prototypes (9 built).
OV-1A (AO-1AF)
Daylight observation variant (64 built). Short wingspan (42 ft).
OV-1A - Pittsburgh Institute of Aeronautics
Fitted with two additional Westinghouse J34 jet engines. A non-flying, mixed-power, testbed, operated by the Pittsburgh Institute of Aeronautics (1 conversion).
OV-1B (AO-1BF)
SLAR variant (101 built). Long wingspan (48 ft).
OV-1C (AO-1CF)
IR reconnaissance variant (169 built). Short wingspan (42 ft).
OV-1D
Consolidated sensor variant (37 new, 82 conversions). Long wingspan (48 ft).
JOV-1A
OV-1As and OV-1Cs fitted with armament (59 conversions).
RV-1C
Quick Look ELINT machines (two conversions).
RV-1D
Quick Look II ELINT machine (31 conversions).
EV-1E
Quick Look III ELINT machine (16 conversions).
OV-1E
Prototype for unproduced modernized variant (1 built).

== Operators ==
Argentina

- Argentine Army Aviation

Israel

- Israeli Air Force

United States

- United States Army
- Army National Guard

== Surviving aircraft ==
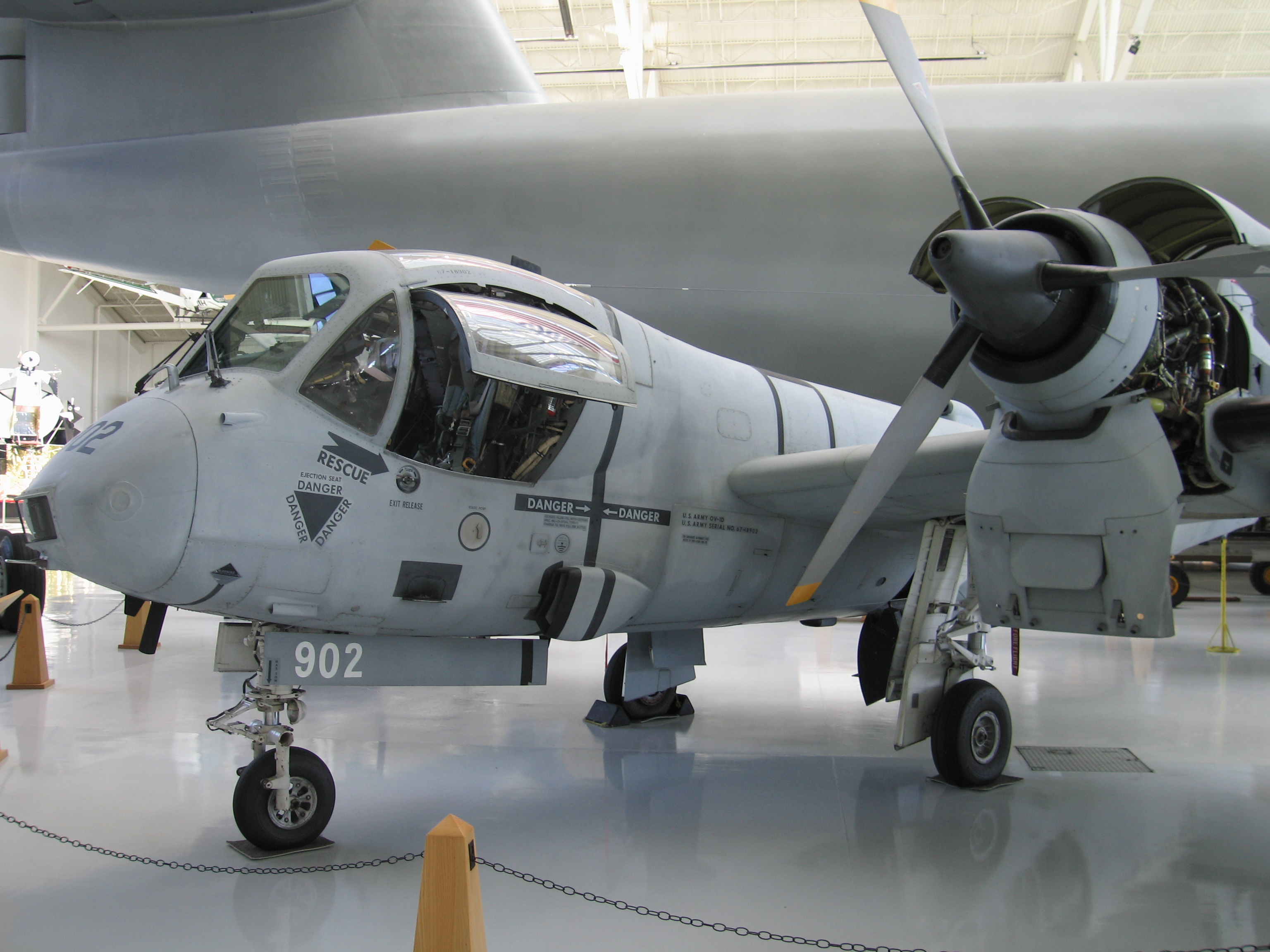
OV-1D Mohawk at the Evergreen Aviation & Space Museum in McMinnville, Oregon

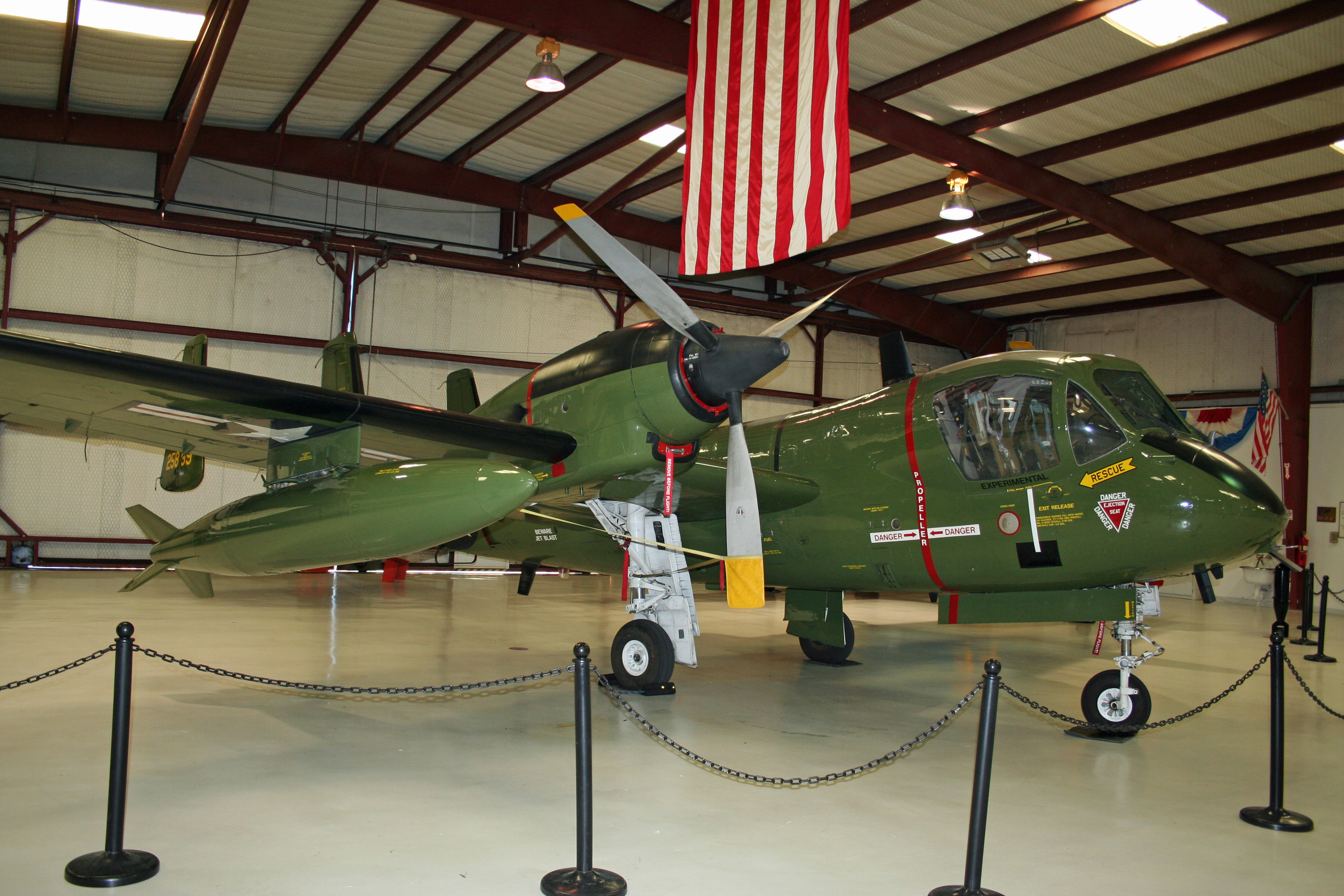
OV-1D Mohawk at the Cavanaugh Flight Museum

=== Airworthy ===
- 59-2604 – OV-1A flown by the Planes of Fame Air Museum in Chino, California.
- 62-5874 – Flown by the Carolinas Aviation Museum at airshows.
- 62-5889 – Cavanaugh Flight Museum in Addison, Texas. Removed from public display when the museum indefinitely closed on 1 January 2024. To be moved to North Texas Regional Airport in Denison, Texas.
- 62-5890 – Flown by the Carolinas Aviation Museum at airshows.
- 64-14262 – American Wings Air Museum, Blaine, Minnesota.
- 67-15959 – Operated by Mohawk Technologies and based at Palm Beach County Park Airport in Lantana, Florida.
- 67-18899 – Operated by Mohawk Technologies and based at Palm Beach County Park Airport in Lantana, Florida.
- 67-18923 – Operated by Mohawk Technologies and based at Palm Beach County Park Airport in Lantana, Florida.
- 67-18924 – Operated by Mohawk Technologies and based at Palm Beach County Park Airport in Lantana, Florida.
- 67-18926 – Owned by Paul Pefley, CEO of Mohawk Technologies, and based at Palm Beach County Park Airport in Lantana, Florida.
- 68-15936 – American Wings Air Museum, Blaine, Minnesota.
- 68-15946 – Operated by Mohawk Technologies and based at Palm Beach County Park Airport in Lantana, Florida.
- 68-15947 – Located at Air Heritage Museum, Beaver County Airport, Pennsylvania. No longer owned by museum.
- 69-17004 – Operated by Mohawk Technologies and based at Palm Beach County Park Airport in Lantana, Florida.

=== Static display ===
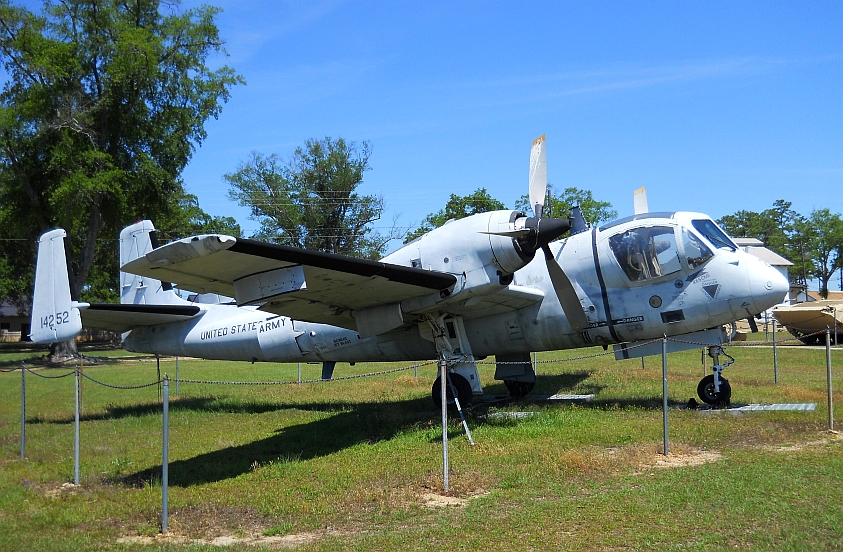
OV-1 Mohawk on display Mississippi Armed Forces Museum

- 57-6539 – YOV-1A on display at the United States Army Aviation Museum in Fort Novosel, Alabama.
- 59-2631 – OV-1B on display at the Zephyrhills Museum of Military History in Zephyrhills, Florida.
- 59-2633 – OV-1B on display at Cradle of Aviation Museum
- 60-3740 – OV-1A on display at New Jersey Aviation Hall of Fame, Teterboro Airport, Teterboro, NJ.
- 60-3747 – OV-1C on display at the 1st Cavalry Division Museum in Fort Cavazos, Texas.
- 61-2700 – OV-1C on display at the Aviation History & Technology Center in Marietta, Georgia.
- 61-2724 – The Pima Air & Space Museum adjacent to Davis–Monthan Air Force Base in Tucson, Arizona lists an OV-1C Mohawk as a static display
- 62-5856 – The Wings of Eagles Discovery Center owns an OV-1C on static display among its collection
- 62-5860 – OV-1B on display at the United States Army Aviation Museum at Fort Novosel, Alabama.
- 62-5874 – Hickory Aviation Museum, Hickory, NC
- 62-5875 – Headquarters, 48th Infantry Brigade Combat Team, (Georgia Army National Guard) in Macon, Georgia displays a static OV-1D as part of an outdoor exhibit
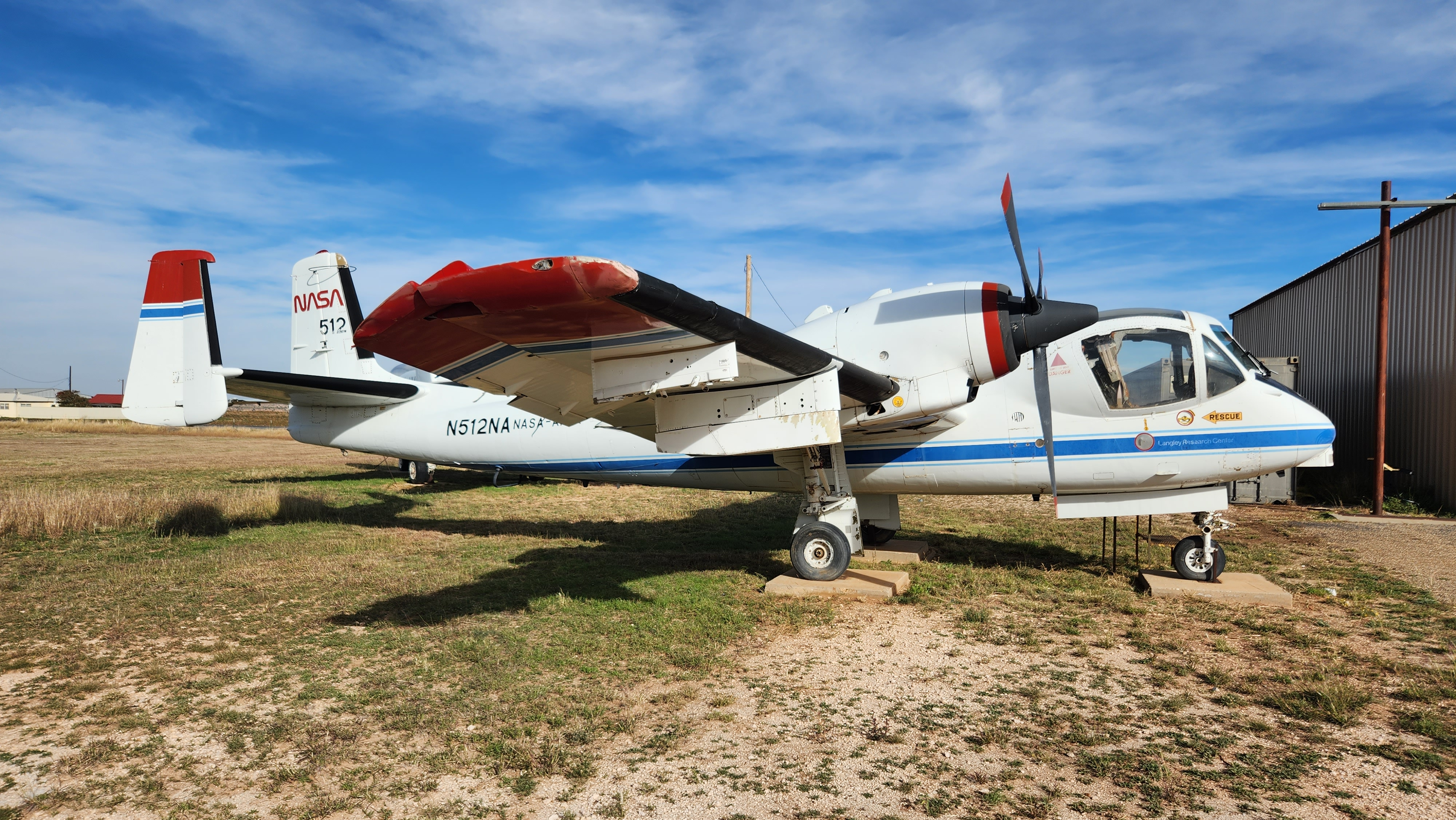
- NASA OV-1 Mohawk at the Texas Air Museum in Slaton, Texas.
  62-5880 – Texas Air Museum in Slaton, Texas has a modified OV-1D that was used by NASA that is on loan from the Museum of Naval Aviation.
- 62-5906 – Cockpit only on display at the Valiant Air Command Warbird Museum.
- 63-13128 – Military Aviation Preservation Society (MAPS) Air Museum (under restoration for museum display)
- 64-14247 – The United States Army's Tobyhanna Army Depot in Tobyhanna, Pennsylvania, has an OV-1B on display outside the main gate access control point.
- 64-14252 – The Mississippi Armed Forces Museum at Camp Shelby has an OV-1 on static display
- 67-15959 – The G-Star School of the Arts in West Palm Beach, Florida displays a static OV-1D
- 67-18902 – The Evergreen Aviation & Space Museum in McMinnville, Oregon displays a static OV-1D
- 67-18922 – Hunter Army Airfield in Savannah, Georgia displays a static OV-1D as part of an outdoor exhibit
- 67-18930 – Fort Huachuca, Arizona maintains a static display of an OV-1 Mohawk
- 68-15932 – OV-1D c/n 136C, Argentine Army Aviation AE-021 – displayed at the Argentine Army Museum ((in Spanish) Museo Histórico del Ejército), Buenos Aires, Argentina.
- 68-15939 – Was at McClain's Military Museum in Anderson, Indiana but now sits at "Vic's Antiques and Uniques" in Edinburgh, Indiana
- 69-16998 – The Valiant Air Command Warbird Museum at Space Coast Regional Airport in Titusville, Florida has a static OV-1 on display
- 69-17007 – Part of Fort Cavazos, this Mohawk is on a pedestal in front of the 15th MI Bn on Robert Gray AAF on Mohawk Rd.
- 69-17010? – The United States Army Aviation Museum at Fort Novosel, Alabama displays a static OV-1D as part of the outdoor exhibit at the intersection of Red Cloud Avenue and Ruf Avenue
- 69-17021 – The Fort Worth Aviation Museum at Fort Worth, Texas displays a static OV-1D as part of the outdoor exhibit
- 69-17022 - United States Army Garrison Humphreys in South Korea, OV-1 Mohawk displayed outdoors at the intersection round-a-bout of Key Street & CPX Road
- The United States Army Intelligence and Security Command Headquarters Building at Fort Belvoir, Virginia displays a static OV-1D
- AZO Plane Partners in current possession of the Air Zoo's OV-1D
- OV-1D ex-Argentine Army Aviation, in the Aviación del Ejército Argentino Park Buenos Aires, Argentina
- OV-1D Air Zoo Aerospace & Science Museum, Kalamazoo, Michigan

== Specifications (OV-1D) ==
Grumman OV-1A Mohawk 3-view

Data from Jane's Civil and Military Aircraft Upgrades 1994–95

General characteristics

- Crew: 2
- Length: 41 ft 0 in (12.50 m)
- Wingspan: 48 ft 0 in (14.63 m)
- Height: 12 ft 8 in (3.86 m)
- Wing area: 360 sq ft (33 m^{2})
- Aspect ratio: 5.35:1
- Airfoil: NACA 2412
- Empty weight: 12,054 lb (5,468 kg)
- Gross weight: 15,544 lb (7,051 kg) (Normal take-off weight, IR mission)
- Max takeoff weight: 18,109 lb (8,214 kg) (SLAR mission)
- Fuel capacity: 276 US gal (230 imp gal; 1,040 L) internal fuel
- Powerplant: 2 × Lycoming T53-L-701 turboprops, 1,400 shp (1,000 kW) each
- Propellers: 3-bladed Hamilton Standard Type 53C51-27 constant-speed propellers, 10 ft 0 in (3.05 m) diameter

Performance

- Maximum speed: 305 mph (491 km/h, 265 kn) (IR mission)
- Cruise speed: 207 mph (333 km/h, 180 kn) (econ. cruise)
- Stall speed: 84 mph (135 km/h, 73 kn)
- Never exceed speed: 450 mph (720 km/h, 390 kn)
- Range: 944 mi (1,519 km, 820 nmi) with external tanks (SLAR mission)
- Endurance: 4.35 hr (SLAR mission)
- Service ceiling: 25,000 ft (7,600 m)
- Rate of climb: 3,466 ft/min (17.61 m/s) (SLAR mission)
- Take-off to 50 ft (15 m): 1,175 ft (358 m)
- Landing run from 50 ft (15 m): 1,060 ft (320 m)

== See also ==
Aircraft of comparable role, configuration, and era

- FMA IA 58 Pucará
- North American Rockwell OV-10 Bronco

Related lists

- List of military electronics of the United States
