= Aviation History & Technology Center =

- Location within Georgia
- Former name: Aviation Museum and Discovery Center; The Aviation Wing (of the Marietta Museum of History)
- Established: 2002
- Location: Marietta, Georgia
- Coordinates: 33.933°N 84.539°W
- Type: Aviation museum
- Founder: Robert Ormsby
- Website: www.ahtc360.org

The Aviation History & Technology Center is an aviation museum located at Dobbins Air Reserve Base in Marietta, Georgia.

== History ==
=== Establishment ===
In the 1980s, the B-29 Superfortress Association was formed to acquire aircraft built at United States Air Force Plant 6. (Note: To this end, an AC-130 was moved to the air force base in 1995. The museum had also planned to acquire a B-29 named Sweet Eloise that was on display at NAS Atlanta nearby.) After many years, it was incorporated in 2002. Then, in 2005, a parcel of 15.5 acres (0.063 km^{2}) was leased from the United States Air Force to the government of Cobb County for the creation of a 45,000 sq ft (4,200 m^{2}) museum. (Note: The museum used many names in its early years, including Marietta Air Museum, Aviation Museum at Marietta, Georgia and Marietta Aeronautical Museum and Education Center.) The museum, since renamed the Aviation Museum and Discovery Center, requested an $8 million grant from the state to establish an aviation middle school in 2008. Later that year, restoration began on a C-141B.

=== Acquisition by Marietta Museum of History ===
However, the museum closed in 2009 after failing to raise enough money to begin construction. Its lease and assets were acquired by the Marietta Museum of History, which renamed the collection The Aviation Wing. Restoration on aircraft continued for several years as the museum reorganized and attempted to raise money. During that time, the museum also received certification from the National Museum of the United States Air Force to receive aircraft on loan. In 2015, the museum opened to the public.

=== Independence ===
The Marietta Museum of History was absorbed into the city of Marietta in 2018. As part of the process, the Aviation Wing was spun off and eventually became the Aviation History & Technology Center. With the arrival of four engines in 2019, the decades long restoration of the museum's YC-141B neared completion. The year ended with the acquisition of a Lockheed JetStar, which was moved to the museum two years later.

== Exhibits ==
Exhibits at the museum include a Legacy Plaza and Victory Garden.

== Collection ==
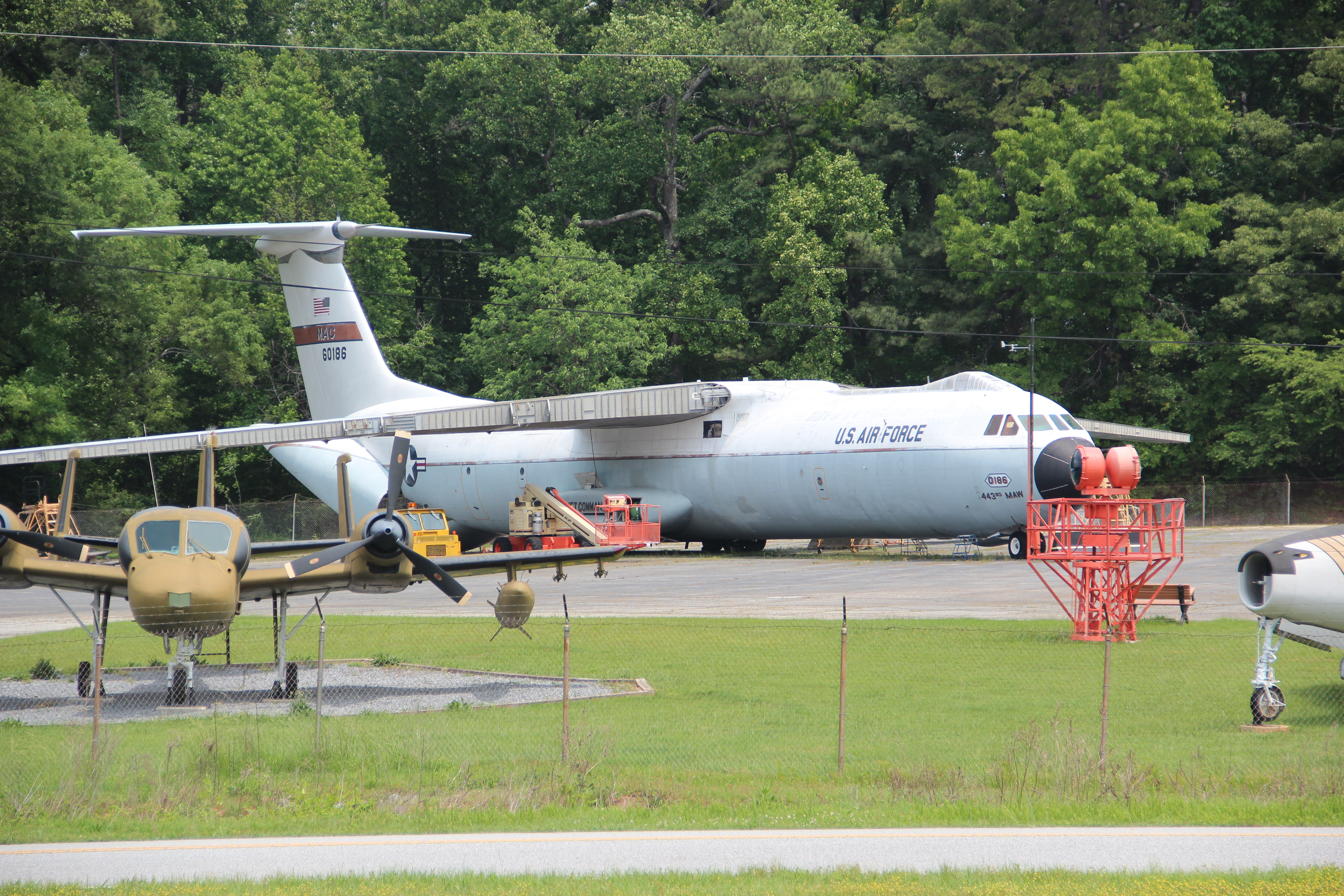
Lockheed YC-141B Starlifter

=== Aircraft ===
- Douglas A-4A Skyhawk
- Grumman A-6E Intruder
- Grumman F-14A Tomcat
- Grumman OV-1C Mohawk
- LET L-13 Blaník
- Lockheed AC-130A Spectre
- Lockheed JetStar
- Lockheed JetStar
- Lockheed S-3B Viking
- Lockheed YC-141B Starlifter
- LTV A-7E Corsair II
- North American F-86D Sabre
- Republic F-84F Thunderstreak
- Thorp T-18 Tiger

=== Other ===
- Ryan BQM-34A Firebee

== Events ==
The museum holds an annual Wings & Whitewalls car show.

== See also ==
- List of aviation museums
