= Tracy Negoshian =

American fashion designer

- Born: October 20, 1981 (age 44)
- Education: University of South Florida
- Occupation: Fashion designer
- Label: Tracy Negoshian, Inc.

Tracy Negoshian (born October 20, 1981) is a designer of women's clothing. She is a native of Zephyrhills, Florida.

== History ==
As a teenager, Tracy Negoshian became a champion scholastic golfer. She studied at University of South Florida.

In college she began work on clothing design. She would modify team jerseys, add flair and then sport her "new" apparel to games and events.

After college in 2004, Negoshian moved to Palm Beach, Florida. She canvassed many of the local businesses (and all of the high-end retail stores on Worth Avenue) in search of an opportunity. She was ultimately hired by Saks Fifth Avenue to be an assistant in their Designer Salon.

In 2007, while attending the National Championship football game, she saw women wearing fan apparel that reminded her of her college days and how she would alter jerseys into fashionable garments. Negoshian recognized a market opportunity for garments like these.

She expanded on the concept that she could make college game day apparel trendy, fun and multi-purpose. She created My Team Boutique and began designing garments along the likes of some of the more popular colleges in the Southeastern United States.

Negoshian decided after a successful launch with My Team Boutique that a three-month season was not substantial and that she needed to explore options for a multi-line approach. In 2009, she launched Tracy Negoshian, Inc.

== Clothing line ==
Her early inspirations included designers Diane Von Furstenberg and Emilio Pucci.

Her garments are often compared to the likes of Tory Burch, Lilly Pulitzer, Nanette Lepore and Trina Turk.

Tracy opened her first flagship TRACY NEGOSHIAN store October 2013 in Naples on 5th Avenue. By January 2014, over 500 boutiques in the U.S. and Puerto Rico carried the Tracy Negoshian brand.
