= Chrysler Valiant (SV1) =

Australian full-size car

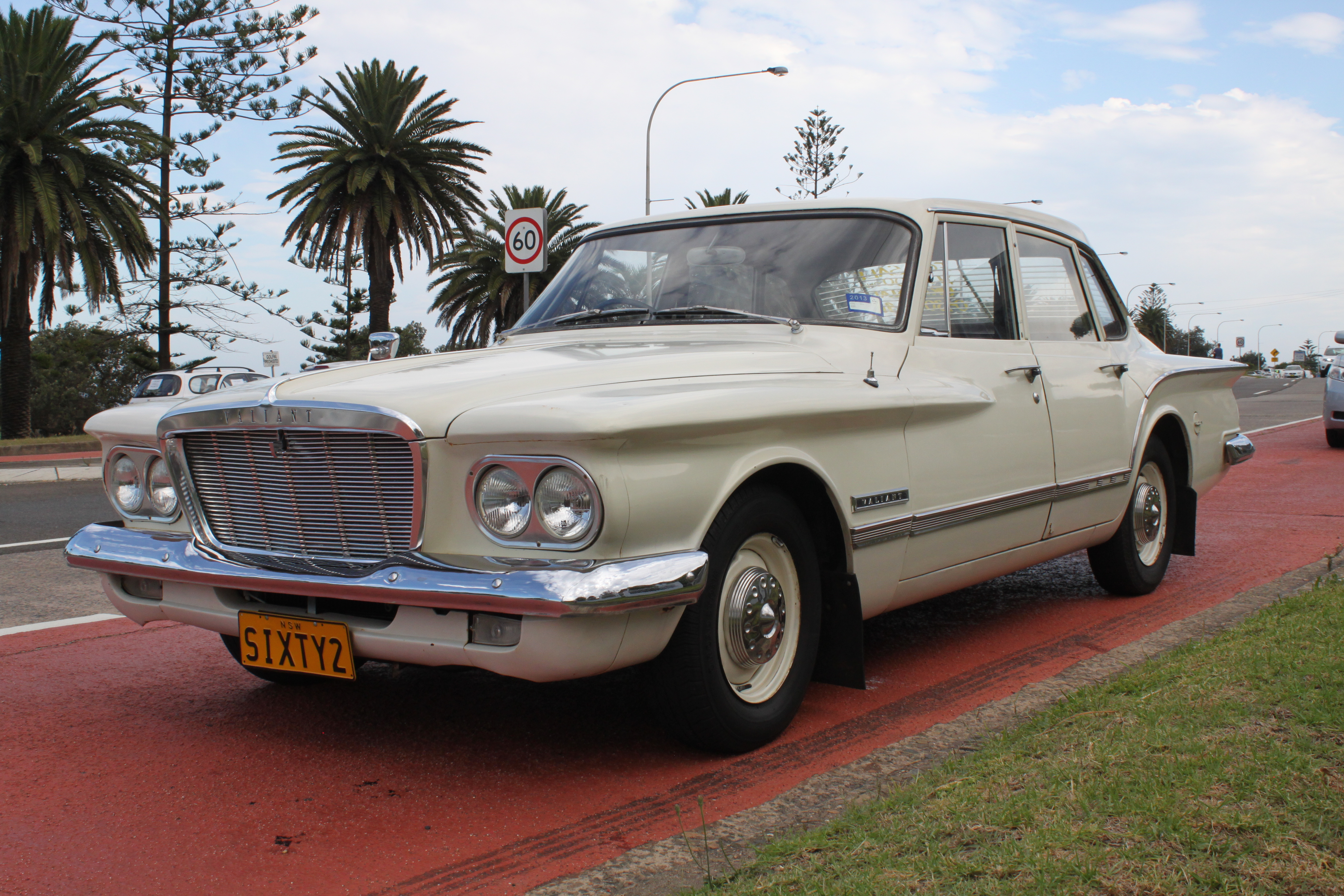
- Chrysler Valiant (SV1)

Overview
- Manufacturer: Chrysler Australia
- Also called: Plymouth Valiant
- Production: March 1962 – April 1963
- Assembly: Australia: Mile End, South Australia

Body and chassis
- Body style: 4-door sedan
- Layout: FR layout
- Platform: Chrysler A platform
- Related: Plymouth Valiant

Powertrain
- Engine: 225 cu in (3.7 L) I6
- Transmission: 3-speed manual 3-speed automatic

Dimensions
- Wheelbase: 106.5 in (2,705 mm)
- Length: 183.7 in (4,666 mm)
- Width: 70.4 in (1,788 mm)
- Height: 56.7 in (1,440 mm)
- Kerb weight: 2,704 lb (1,227 kg)

Chronology
- Predecessor: Chrysler Valiant (RV1)
- Successor: Chrysler Valiant (AP5)

The Chrysler Valiant (SV1) is an automobile which was produced in Australia from March 1962 to April 1963 by Chrysler Australia. It was the second Australian Chrysler Valiant model, replacing the RV1 (R series)

== Changes ==
The SV1 Valiant (or "S Series") was introduced in March 1962, replacing the Chrysler Valiant (RV1)—also known as the "R Series"—only ten weeks after the release of its predecessor. Like the RV1 it was essentially a US design just assembled in Australia. It was an evolution of the previous model, featuring a revised radiator grille treatment with the name "Valiant" at the top. The boot lid no longer included a non-functional spare wheel moulding and round tail-lights replaced the previous oblong units. Mechanical changes included larger brakes, increased fuel tank capacity and a corrosion-resistant exhaust muffler. A steering-column mounted gearshift replaced the floor-mounted shifter, however cars fitted with the automatic transmission option retained push-putton controls.

== Model range ==
The Valiant SV1 was produced in two models:

Valiant SV1-2 manual sedan
Valiant SV1-4 automatic sedan

The SV1 was offered only in 4 door sedan form. Like its predecessor, the SV1 was marketed as Valiant by Chrysler rather than as Chrysler Valiant.

== Engines and transmissions ==
The SV1 Valiant was offered only with the, 225-cubic-inch (3.7 L) capacity inline, Slant-6 engine with a choice of three-speed manual transmission or three-speed TorqueFlite automatic transmission.

== Production and replacement ==
Some 10,009 SV1 Valiants were built prior to its replacement by the Chrysler AP5 Valiant in May 1963. 4,513 of these were SV1-2 manual sedans and 5,496 were SV1-4 automatic sedans.

New Zealand production

The SV1 was exported to New Zealand in 1963 and then assembled locally from knockdown kits from 1964 by Todd Motors in Petone, Wellington.

== Gallery ==
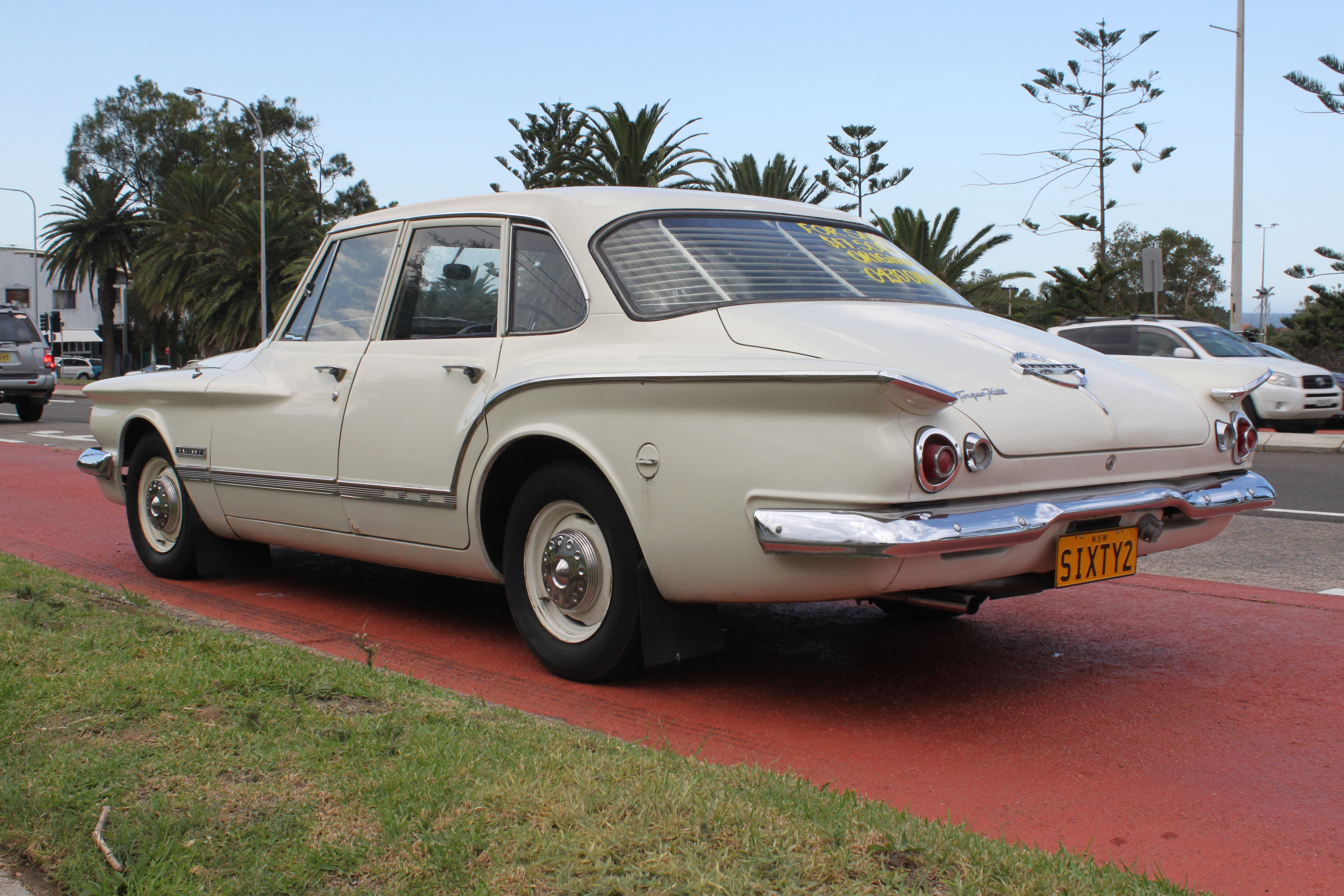
Rear view

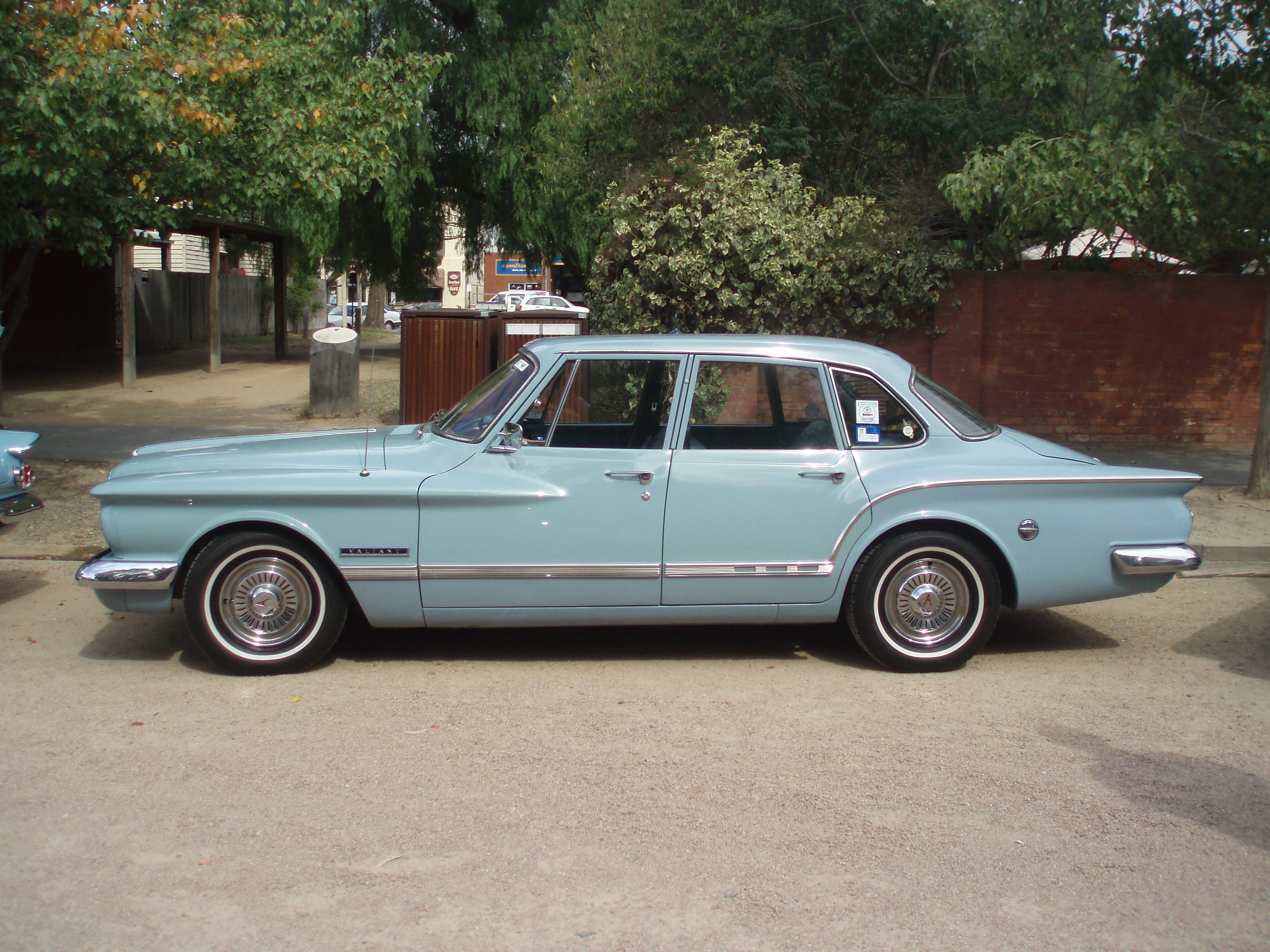
Side view

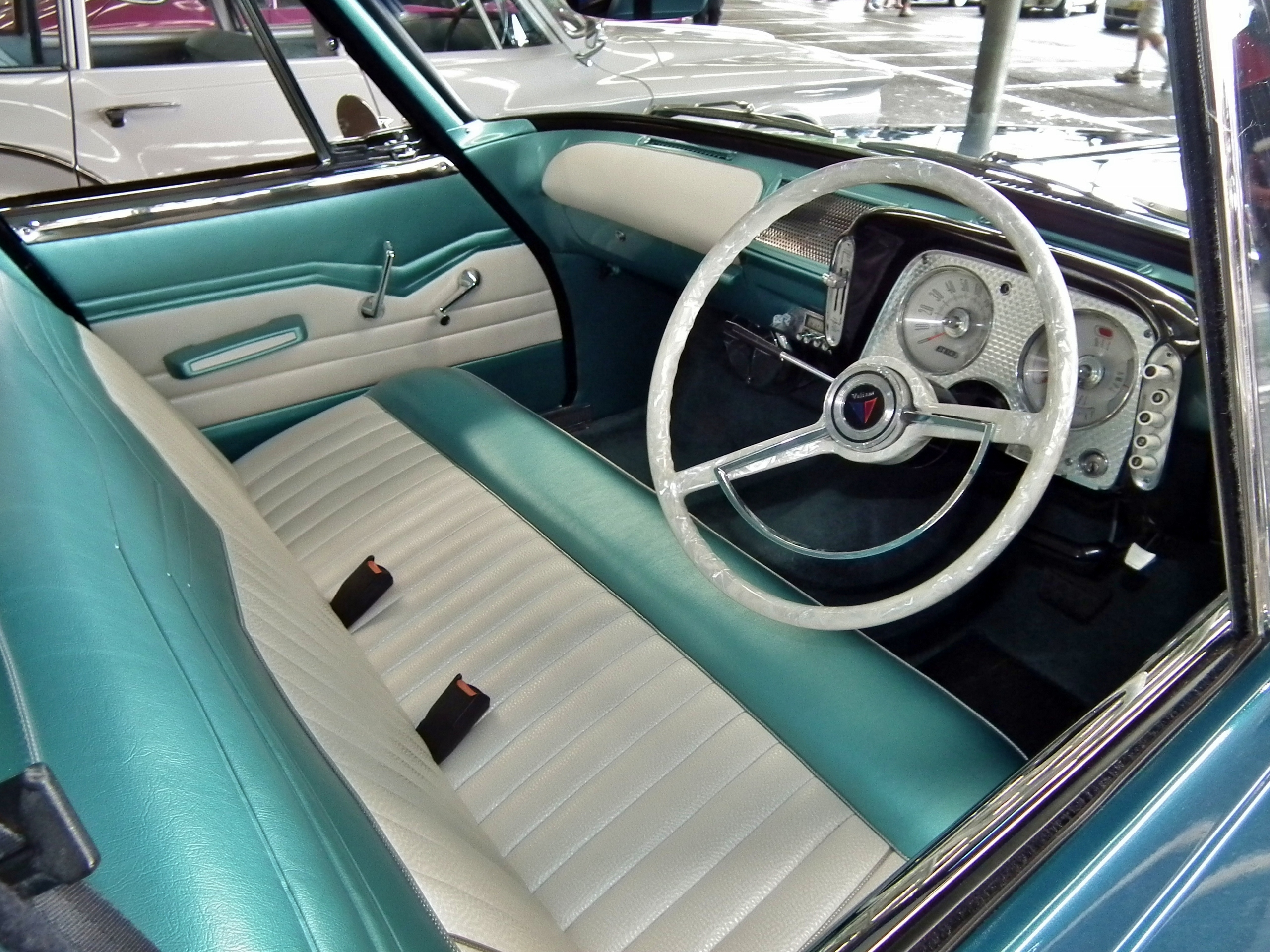
Interior
