= Zephyrhills Municipal Airport =

Public Airport in Zephyrhills, Florida, U.S.

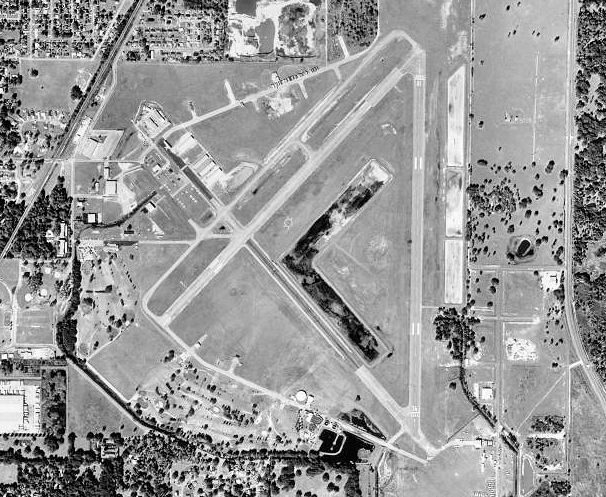
- USGS 1999 orthophoto
- IATA: ZPH; ICAO: KZPH; FAA LID: ZPH

Summary
- Airport type: Public
- Owner: City of Zephyrhills
- Serves: Zephyrhills, Florida
- Elevation AMSL: 90 ft / 27 m
- Coordinates: 28°13′41″N 082°09′21″W
- Website: ci.zephyrhills.fl.us/...

Map
- Location of airport in Florida ZPH (the United States)

Runways
Direction	Length		Surface
Direction	ft	m	Surface
05/23	5,001	1,524	Asphalt
1/19	6,201	1,890	Asphalt

Statistics (2017)
- Aircraft operations (year ending 12/12/2017): 49,425
- Based aircraft: 174
- Source: Federal Aviation Administration

Zephyrhills Municipal Airport (IATA: ZPH, ICAO: KZPH, FAA LID: ZPH) is a public use airport in Pasco County, Florida, United States. It is owned by the City of Zephyrhills and located one nautical mile (2 km) southeast of its central business district. This airport is included in the National Plan of Integrated Airport Systems for 2011–2015, which categorized it as a general aviation facility.

== History ==
Opened in January 1942, the airport was used by the United States Army Air Forces, specifically the Army Air Forces School of Applied Tactics (AAFSAT) tactical combat simulation school headquartered at Orlando Army Air Base. The military presence at the airport ended on October 31, 1944, and, in 1947, the airport was deeded to the city, which has run it ever since.

In February 2021, the City of Zephyrhills approved $5.47 million dollars for improvements to the airport. The improvements include extending runway 1-19 to 6,200 feet, extending a taxiway, paving runway shoulders and adding an access road.

In 2022, the airport received $6.6 million dollars to construct a new taxiway, two hangars, and a fix-based operator building. In addition, the city received $12.04 million from the state to fund improvements for the airport, extending the National Guard entrance road, and a new National Guard armory.

== Facilities and aircraft ==
Zephyrhills Municipal Airport covers an area of 813 acres (329 ha) at an elevation of 90 feet (27 m) above mean sea level. It has two runways with asphalt surfaces: 5/23 is 5,001 by 100 feet (1,524 x 30 m) and 1/19 is 6,201 by 100 feet (1,890 x 30 m).

For the 12-month period ending December 12, 2017, the airport had 49,425 aircraft operations, an average of 135 per day: 99% general aviation, and <1% air taxi. At that time there were 105 aircraft based at this airport: 88 single-engine, 9 multi-engine airplane, 7 helicopter, and 1 ultralight.

== Skydiving ==
This airport has a long history of skydiving, possibly the longest continuous history of skydiving at any U.S. airport. Skydive City, Inc., founded in 1990, operates a skydiving center, or drop zone, on the southeast side of the airport. The predecessor drop zone was Phoenix Parachute Center, operated by George Kabeller, just north of the current drop zone. Prior to that, a drop zone was operated on the southwest side of the airport. Jim Hooper became the manager of Zephyrhills Parachute Center in December, 1976. Si Fraser owned the Zephyrhills Parachute Center. The drop zone was previously managed by Searles.

=== Skydiving accidents ===
On March 23, 2013, two skydivers at Skydive City, instructor, Orvar Arnarson, 41, and student Andrimar Pordarson, 25, were found dead after their reserve parachutes did not inflate completely before impact.

On January 7, 2018, Joshua Butzke, died at Skydive City after his parachute began spiraling at around 900 feet, causing a hard landing. Joshua was rushed to East Pasco Medical Center, where he was later pronounced dead.

== Accidents and incidents ==
- On April 20, 1993, Douglas C-47B N8056 of Phoenix Air was written off in a wheels-up landing at Zephyrhills following an engine failure while engaged in a parachuting flight based at the airport. An investigation by the NTSB found that the aircraft should have been able to climb on one engine. The pilot's type rating for the DC-3 was suspended following the accident with the requirement that he should pass a Federal Aviation Administration proficiency check before it was restored.
- On May 14, 2001, a Cessna 177 Cardinal lost engine power while enroute to Zephyrhills from Key West. The pilot was unable to regain power, and the aircraft impacted terrain one mile south of Zephyrhills. No fuel was recovered from the fuel system nor observed around the accident site, and the probable cause of the crash was found to be fuel exhaustion due to the pilot's failure to adequately plan for fuel preflight, leading to a subsequent loss of engine power. The pilot and three passengers received minor injuries.
- On September 1, 2002 a Gruber Tiger crashed into a vacant house after takeoff from Zephyrhills. The two occupants were killed. Instrument meteorological conditions prevailed at the time, and witnesses say the pilot looked as if he was trying to circle to land back at the airport.
- On August 28, 2007, an ultralight aircraft crashed after takeoff from Zephyrhills. Both on board died.
- On October 15, 2018, a Hummel Ultracruiser crashed after takeoff from Zephyrhills due to engine power loss. The probable cause was found to be the pilot's failure to activate the plane's auxiliary fuel pump, resulting in fuel starvation and total loss of engine power. Contributing to the accident was the impairing effect of the pilot's medication on his performance. The sole pilot on board received serious injuries.
- On December 7, 2023, a Cessna 172 crashed at the airport. Two people were injured, one was airlifted to a hospital, and while the other was driven by ambulance.

== See also ==
- List of airports in Florida
- List of airports in the Tampa Bay area
- Zephyrhills Museum of Military History, located at the airport
