= Chrysler Valiant (RV1) =

Australian full-size car

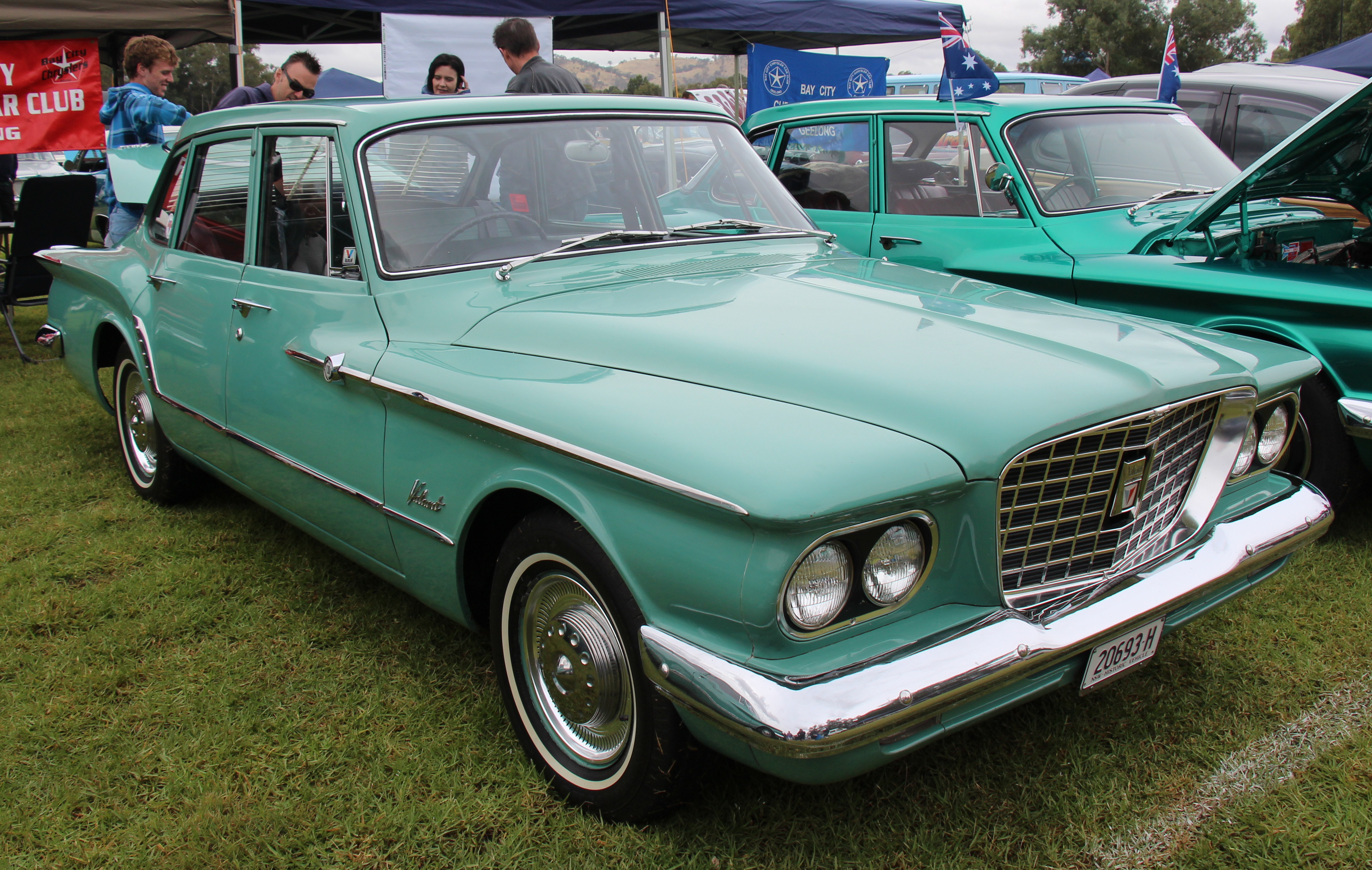
- Chrysler Valiant

Overview
- Manufacturer: Chrysler Australia
- Also called: Plymouth Valiant
- Production: January 1962 – March 1962
- Assembly: Australia: Tonsley Park (final assembly)

Body and chassis
- Body style: 4-door sedan
- Layout: FR layout

Powertrain
- Engine: 225 cu in (3.7 L) I6
- Transmission: 3-speed manual 3-speed automatic

Dimensions
- Wheelbase: 106.5 inches (2705 mm)
- Length: 183.7 in (4,666 mm)
- Width: 70.4 in (1,788 mm)
- Height: 55 in (1,397 mm)
- Kerb weight: 2,604 lb (1,181 kg)

Chronology
- Predecessor: Chrysler Royal
- Successor: Chrysler Valiant (SV1)

The Chrysler Valiant (RV1) is an automobile which was produced in Australia from January 1962 to March 1962 by Chrysler Australia. It was the first Australian Chrysler Valiant model.

The Valiant RV1 (or Valiant R Series) was launched in Australia in January 1962. Completely knocked down (CKD) packs were imported from Windsor in Canada, bodies were painted at Chrysler Australia's Mile End facility and final assembly was undertaken at Tonsley Park. The Australian model comprised a combination of US Valiant V100 base model and V200 deluxe model components.

== Model range ==
The Valiant RV1 was produced in two models:

- Valiant RV1-2 manual sedan
- Valiant RV1-4 automatic sedan

The RV1 was offered only in 4 door sedan form. The RV1 was marketed by Chrysler Australia as the "Valiant by Chrysler" rather than as the Chrysler Valiant.

== Engines and transmissions ==
The RV1 was offered only with a 225-cubic-inch (3.7 L) capacity inline-six engine, with a choice of three-speed manual transmission or optional three-speed TorqueFlight automatic transmission. The engine was called the Slant Six, due to it being inclined to the right at an angle of 30 degrees. This apparently allowed for a lower bonnet line and also allow for the long intake manifold arms which were also a feature.

The manual transmission was a 3 speed floor shift, with a "curvy" style gearstick that wrapped abound the edge of the bench seat, and sat next to the drivers leg. It wasn't until the introduction of the S Series Valiant ( SV1) that the shifter moved to the steering column.

The automatic Chrysler Torqueflite transmission had an excellent reputation for service and smoothness. Gears were selected via pushbuttons which sat to the edge of the cars dash gauges.

== Production and replacement ==
1,008 RV1s were produced by Chrysler Australia prior to its replacement by the Chrysler Valiant (SV1) in March 1962. 672 of these were RV1-2 manual sedans and 336 were RV1-4 automatic sedans.

== Gallery ==
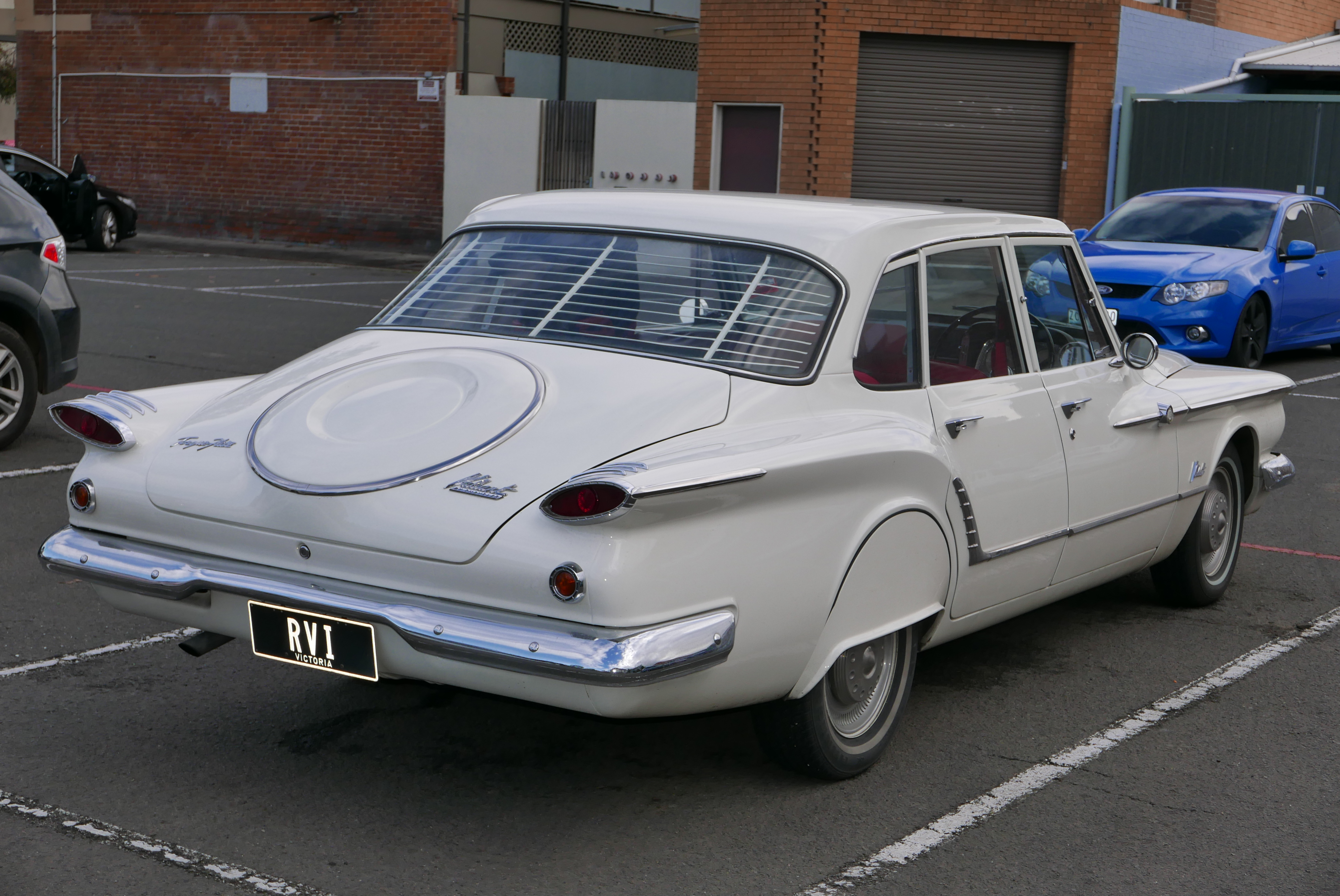
Rear view

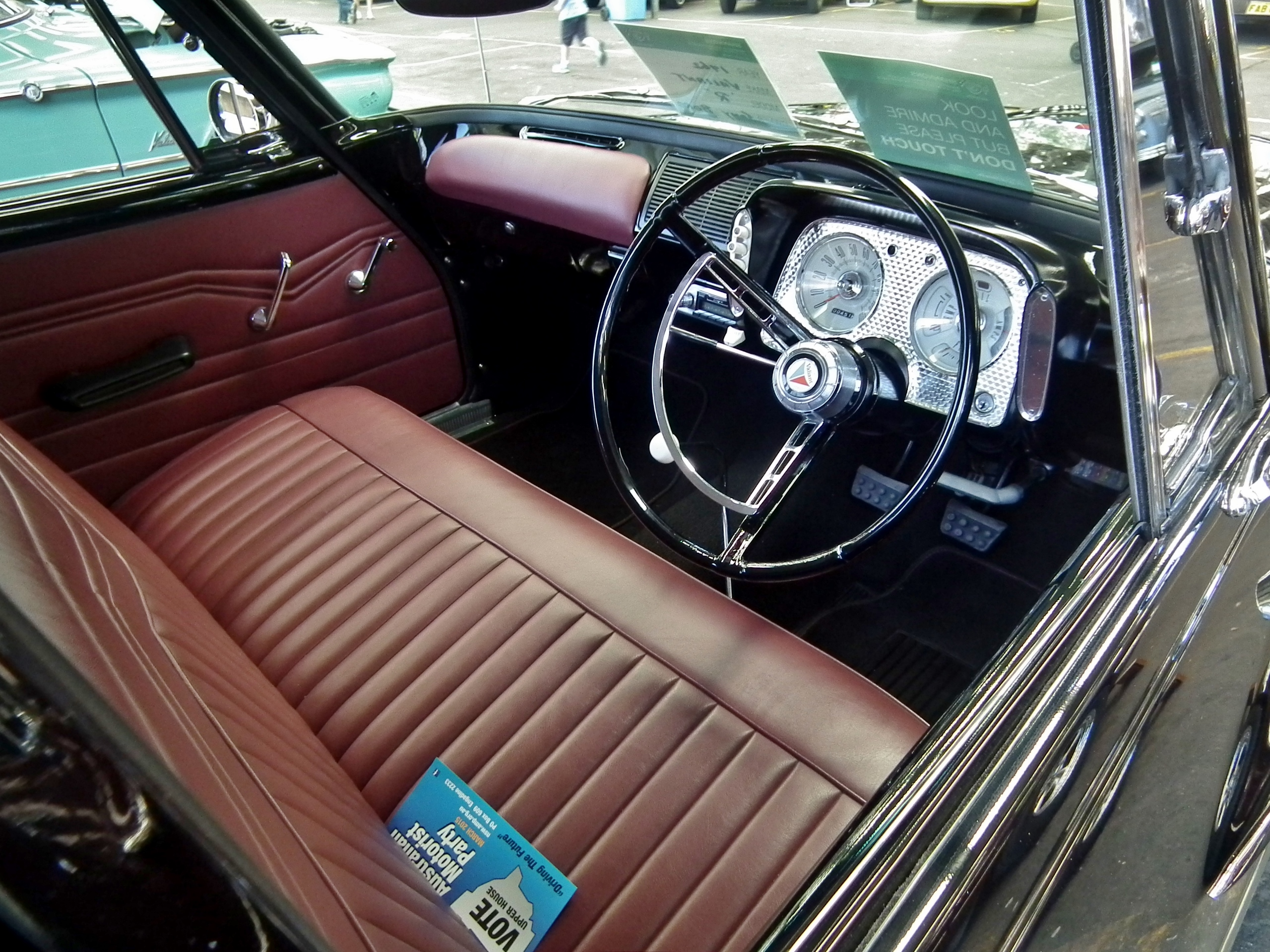
Interior
