= Zephyrhills, Florida =

- City
- City of Zephyrhills
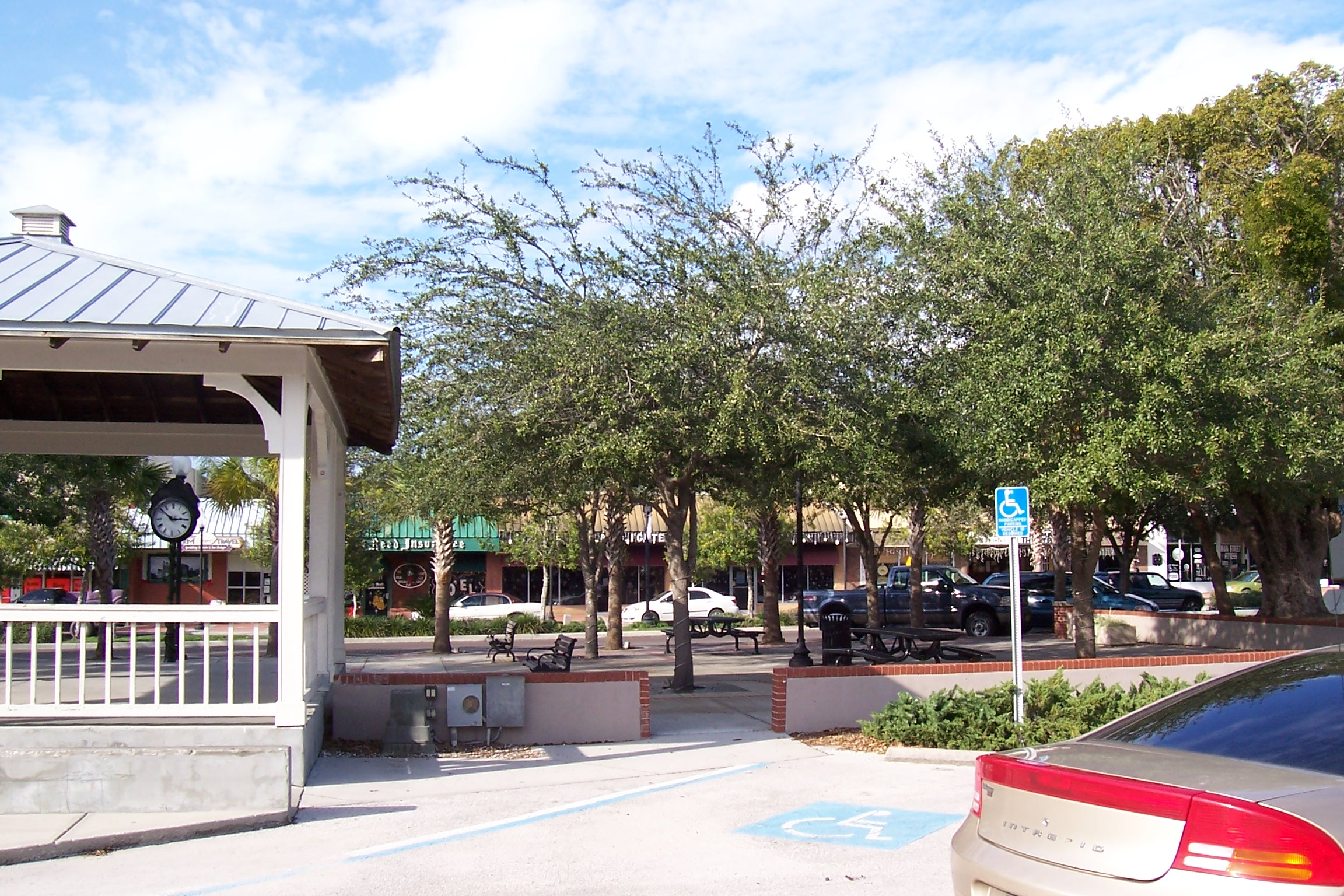
- 5th Avenue in the Zephyrhills Downtown Historic District

- Logo
- Nickname: "Z-hills"
- Motto: "Jump Right In"
- Location in Pasco County and the state of Florida
- Coordinates: 28°14′46″N 82°11′25″W
- Country: United States
- State: Florida
- County: Pasco
- Settled: April 18, 1888
- Incorporated (town): 1910
- Incorporated (city): 1914

Area
  - Total: 9.61 sq mi (24.88 km^{2})
  - Land: 9.55 sq mi (24.74 km^{2})
  - Water: 0.054 sq mi (0.14 km^{2})
- Elevation: 95 ft (29 m)

Population (2020)
  - Total: 17,194
  - Estimate (2021): 18,154
  - Density: 1,799.8/sq mi (694.91/km^{2})
- Demonym: Zephyrhillsan
- Time zone: UTC-5 (Eastern (EST))
  - Summer (DST): UTC-4 (EDT)
- ZIP codes: 33541–33542, 33599 (original code)
- Area code: 813
- FIPS code: 12-79225
- GNIS feature ID: 2405076
- Website: www.zephyrhills.gov

Zephyrhills is a city in Pasco County, Florida, United States. The population was counted at 17,194 in the 2020 census. The city is the headquarters of the Zephyrhills bottled water company. The current mayor is Melonie Monson.

== History ==
Zephyrhills began as the town of Abbott on April 18, 1888, and consisted of 280.74 acres. It was briefly renamed Hegman from 1890 to 1892 until its name was reverted to Abbott. A voting district was established in 1893 followed by a post office in 1896. In 1909, Captain Howard B. Jeffries, a Civil War Union veteran from Pennsylvania, purchased 35,000 acres and created the Zephyrhills Colony Company with a plan to create a community for Civil War veterans. In 1910 the town voted to change its name to Zephyrhills; it was incorporated in 1914.

In 1941, one resident reported that Zephyrhills had a sundown town policy forbidding Black people from living within the city limits.

The city created a historic district in 1999; in 2001 the Zephyrhills Historic District was nominated for and listed on the National Register of Historic Places. A Founders Day celebration is held annually in March.

== Geography ==
Zephyrhills is known for its rolling topography, hence the name.

=== Climate ===
The climate in this area is characterized by hot, humid summers and warm, generally dry winters. According to the Köppen climate classification system, Zephyrhills has a humid subtropical climate, abbreviated "Cfa" on climate maps.

Climate data for Zephyrhills, Florida
Month	Jan	Feb	Mar	Apr	May	Jun	Jul	Aug	Sep	Oct	Nov	Dec	Year
Record high °F (°C)	87 (31)	90 (32)	94 (34)	98 (37)	102 (39)	103 (39)	101 (38)	99 (37)	98 (37)	96 (36)	92 (33)	88 (31)	103 (39)
Mean daily maximum °F (°C)	72.1 (22.3)	74.7 (23.7)	78.4 (25.8)	83.0 (28.3)	88.6 (31.4)	90.8 (32.7)	91.3 (32.9)	91.4 (33.0)	89.5 (31.9)	84.9 (29.4)	78.9 (26.1)	73.6 (23.1)	83.1 (28.4)
Mean daily minimum °F (°C)	49.3 (9.6)	52.0 (11.1)	55.6 (13.1)	59.6 (15.3)	65.9 (18.8)	71.4 (21.9)	72.9 (22.7)	73.1 (22.8)	71.6 (22.0)	65.2 (18.4)	57.8 (14.3)	51.9 (11.1)	62.2 (16.8)
Record low °F (°C)	18 (−8)	16 (−9)	24 (−4)	38 (3)	46 (8)	54 (12)	64 (18)	62 (17)	53 (12)	39 (4)	27 (−3)	18 (−8)	16 (−9)
Average precipitation inches (mm)	3.20 (81)	3.12 (79)	3.69 (94)	2.22 (56)	3.60 (91)	7.39 (188)	7.43 (189)	7.79 (198)	6.65 (169)	2.66 (68)	2.50 (64)	2.78 (71)	53.03 (1,347)
Source 1:
Source 2:

== Demographics ==
Historical population
Census	Pop.	Note	%±
1920	577		—
1930	748		29.6%
1940	1,252		67.4%
1950	1,826		45.8%
1960	2,887		58.1%
1970	3,369		16.7%
1980	5,742		70.4%
1990	8,220		43.2%
2000	10,833		31.8%
2010	13,288		22.7%
2020	17,194		29.4%
2022 (est.)	19,285	▲	12.2%
U.S. Decennial Census

=== Racial and ethnic composition ===
Zephyrhills racial composition (Hispanics excluded from racial categories) (NH = Non-Hispanic)
Race	Pop 2010	Pop 2020	% 2010	% 2020
White (NH)	10,936	11,655	82.30%	67.79%
Black or African American (NH)	578	1,326	4.35%	7.71%
Native American or Alaska Native (NH)	22	41	0.17%	0.24%
Asian (NH)	185	300	1.39%	1.74%
Pacific Islander or Native Hawaiian (NH)	3	13	0.02%	0.08%
Some other race (NH)	12	73	0.09%	0.42%
Two or more races/Multiracial (NH)	166	735	1.25%	4.27%
Hispanic or Latino (any race)	1,386	3,051	10.43%	17.74%
Total	13,288	17,194		

=== 2020 census ===
As of the 2020 census, Zephyrhills had a population of 17,194. The median age was 48.8 years. 18.5% of residents were under the age of 18 and 29.9% of residents were 65 years of age or older. For every 100 females there were 85.0 males, and for every 100 females age 18 and over there were 82.2 males age 18 and over.

99.9% of residents lived in urban areas, while 0.1% lived in rural areas.

There were 7,587 households in Zephyrhills, of which 24.0% had children under the age of 18 living in them. Of all households, 40.4% were married-couple households, 18.0% were households with a male householder and no spouse or partner present, and 34.1% were households with a female householder and no spouse or partner present. About 34.0% of all households were made up of individuals and 19.8% had someone living alone who was 65 years of age or older. According to 2020 ACS 5-year estimates, there were 4,174 families residing in the city.

There were 9,002 housing units, of which 15.7% were vacant. The homeowner vacancy rate was 3.0% and the rental vacancy rate was 9.4%.

=== 2010 census ===
As of the 2010 United States census, there were 13,288 people, 5,977 households, and 3,643 families residing in the city.

== Arts and culture ==
=== Libraries ===
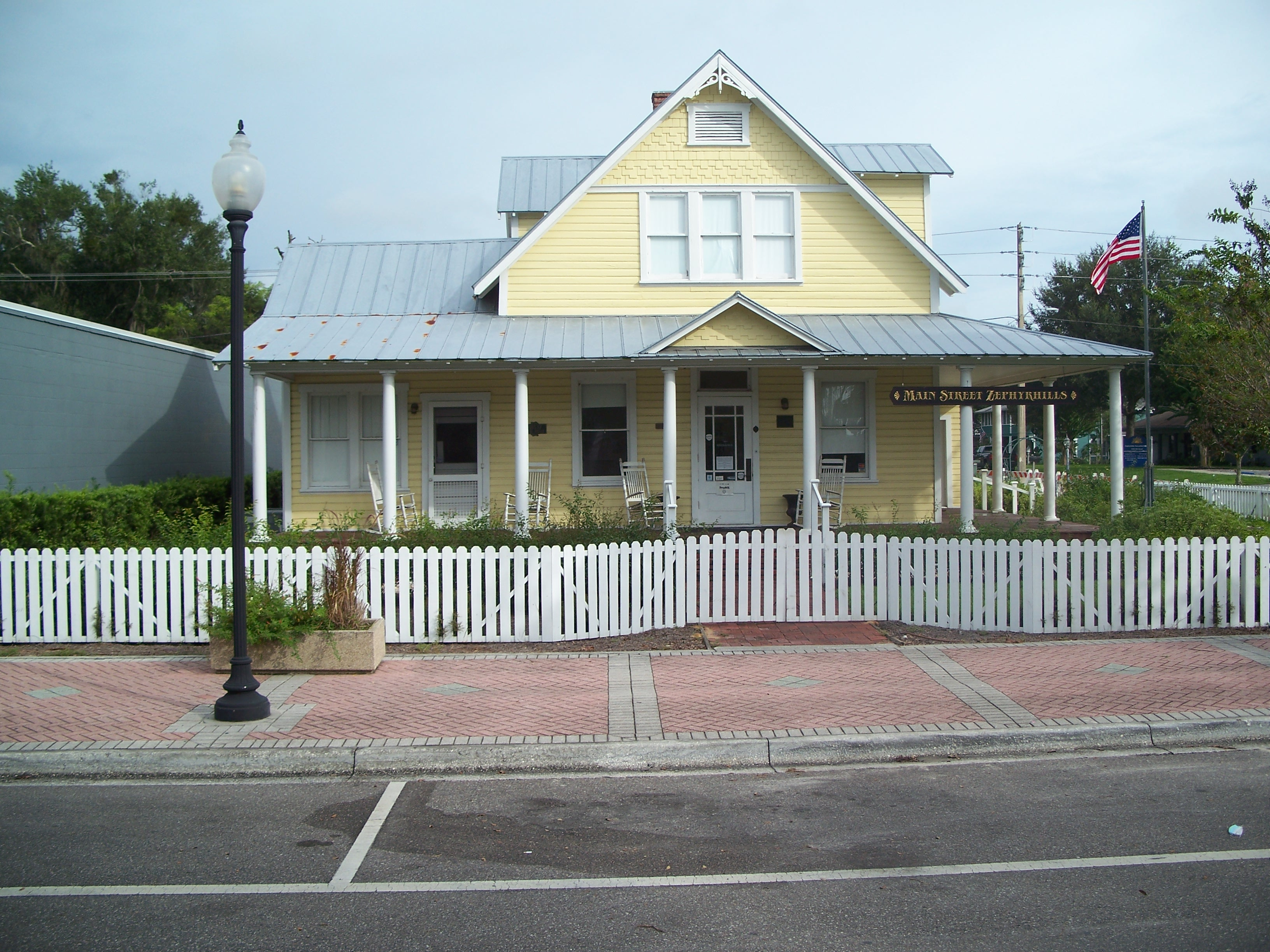
Capt. Howard B. Jeffries House

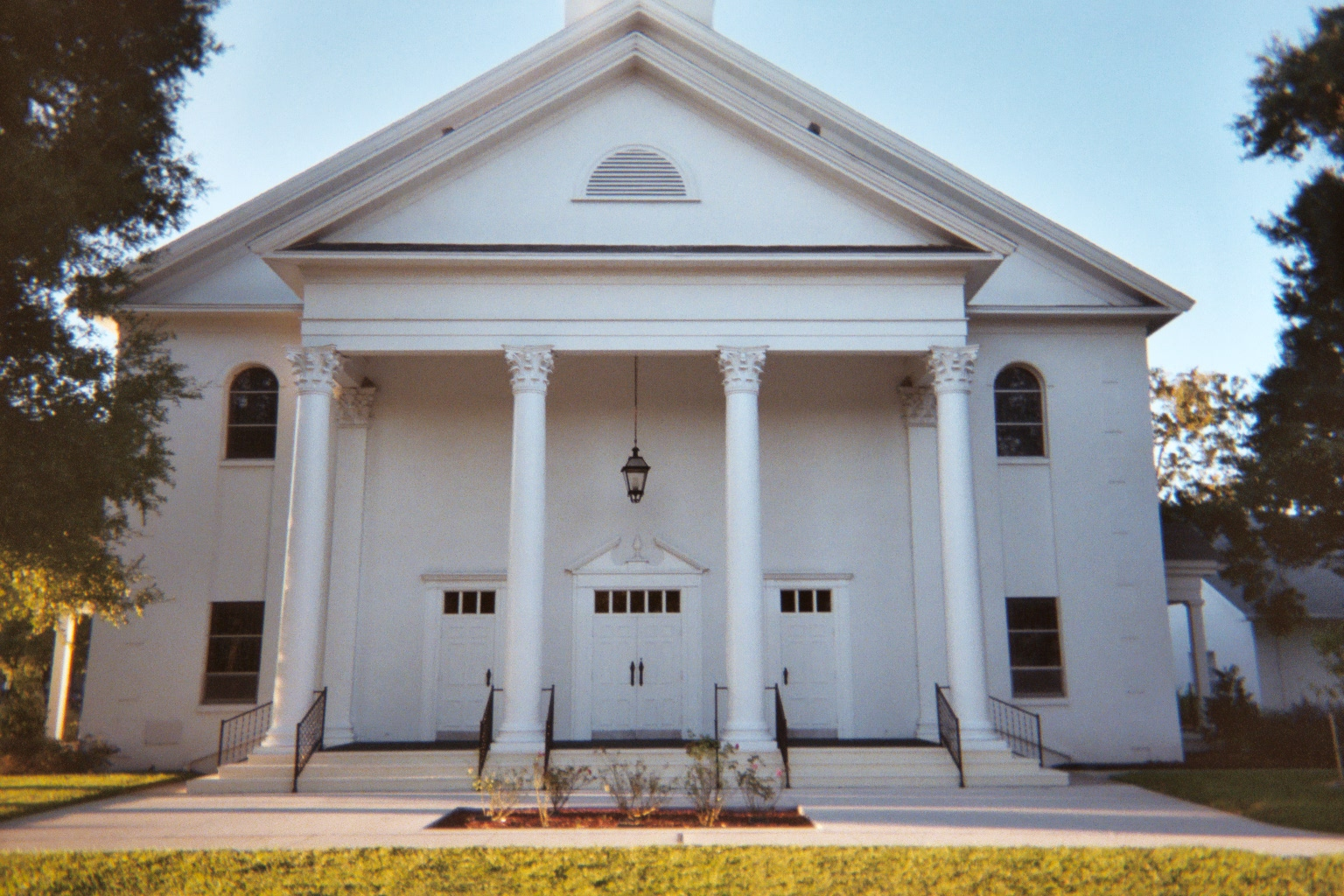
First Methodist Church in the downtown historic district

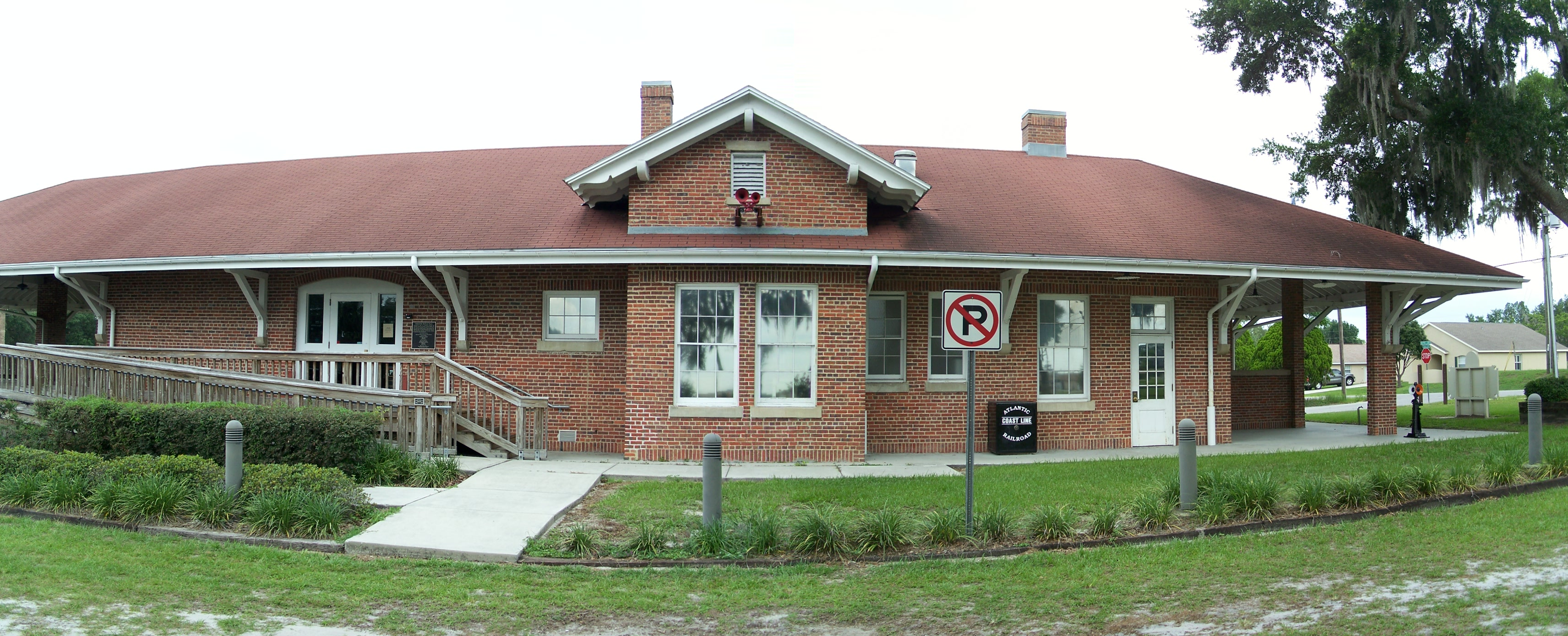
Front of the Zephyrhills Depot Museum

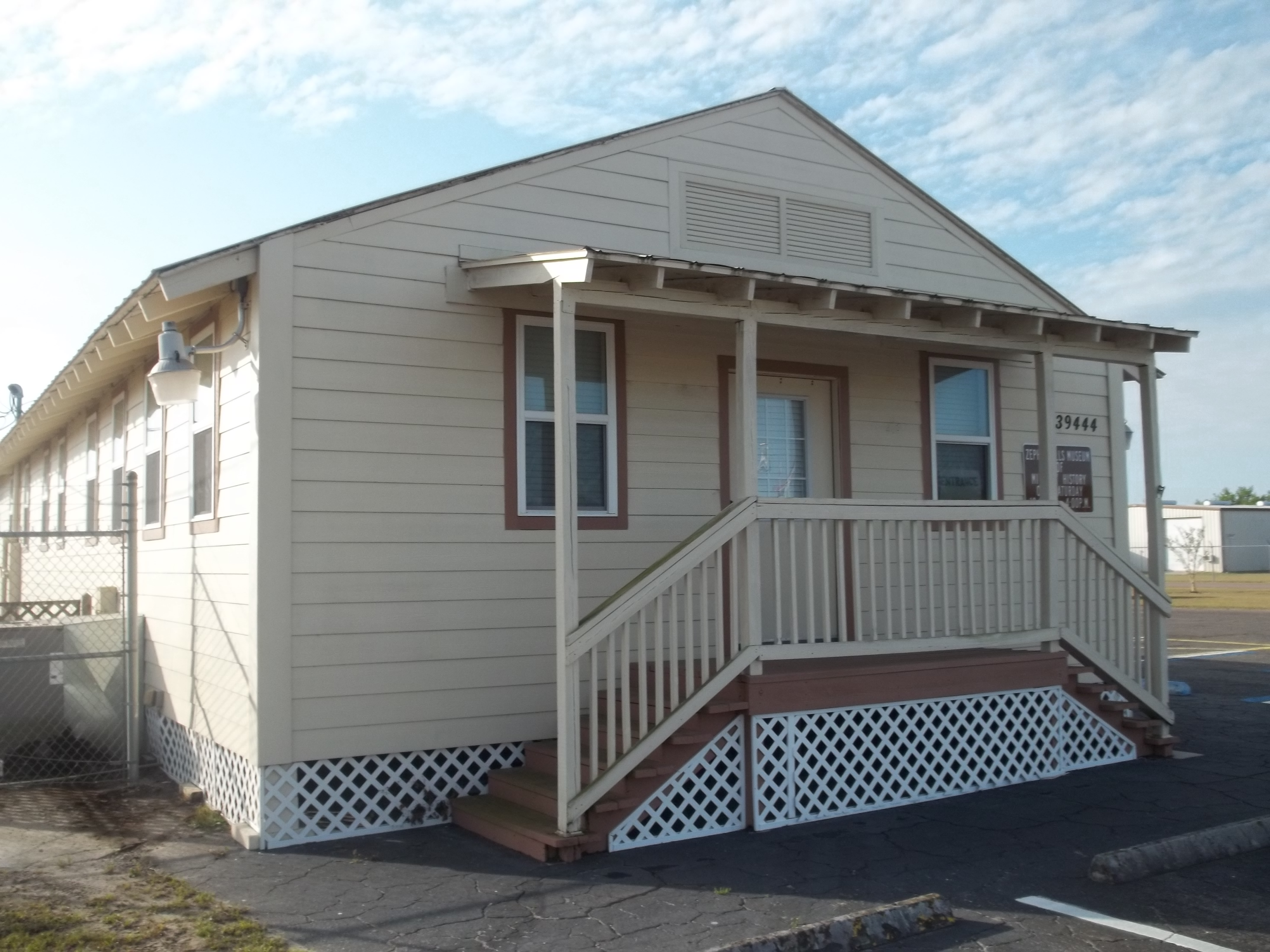
Front of the Zephyrhills Museum of Military History

The Zephyrhills Public Library was founded in 1912. The library is a part of the Pasco County Library Cooperative. A new library was built in 2014.

=== Museums ===
The Zephyrhills Depot Museum originated with the 1989 purchase of the 1927 Atlantic Coast Line Depot from CSX Railroad by the City of Zephyrhills. The original depot was relocated 200 feet (61 m) west of its original location. The 2,700 square feet (250 m^{2}) building was restored and opened in 1998.

The Zephyrhills Museum of Military History is a renovated infirmary used in World War II at the Zephyrhills Municipal Airport. The airport was used for training, and the infirmary is the only extant building from the war.

== Infrastructure ==
=== Transport ===
==== Major roads ====
- US 301 (Fort King Highway/Gall Boulevard) is the main road through Zephyrhills running north and south through the city.
- SR 39 (Paul S. Buchman Highway/Gall Boulevard) runs northwest and southeast from Plant City into US 301 in Zephyrhills, and joins US 301 as a "hidden state road".
- CR 41 (Fort King Highway/Fort King Road) is an extension of SR 41, which is a hidden state road along US 301 from the Hillsborough County Line.
- SR 54 (Fifth Avenue) is the main east–west road that runs through southern Pasco County, from US 19 near Holiday to US 301 in Zephyrhills. A County extension (CR 54/Eiland Boulevard) from the intersection of SR 54 and CR 579 to U.S. Route 98 in Branchborough also exists, and a western extension to CR 577 in Wesley Chapel is planned for construction.
- SR 56 (State Road 56) is a 2002-built road between SR 54 and runs to US 301 south of Zephyrhills.
- County Road 579 (Morris Bridge Road/Eiland Boulevard/Handcart Road) is a bi-county extension of State Road 579 that runs from northern Tampa, through the western edge of the city, to west of Dade City. County Road 54 overlaps CR 579 north of SR 54 until it branches off to the east.
- County Road 535 (Chancey Road/Old Lakeland Highway) runs along the southern and eastern edge of the city and north into County Road 35 Alternate in Vitis.

==== Public transportation ====
Zephyrhills is served by Pasco County Public Transportation on routes #30, #33, and #54.

==== Airport ====
The city is served by Zephyrhills Municipal Airport. It was also once served by the 1927-built Zephyrhills Depot on the Atlantic Coast Line, which is now the Zephyrhills Depot Museum at a city park near the airport. More than 70,000 skydives are performed annually on the airport at Skydive City, Inc., the largest woman-owned drop zone in the world, founded in 1990 by Joannie Murphy and Susan Perkins Stark.

==== Railroads ====
CSX Transportation's Yeoman Subdivision becomes the Wildwood Subdivision as they pass through the eastern parts of Zephyrhills.

=== Public safety ===
The Zephyrhills Police Department consists of about 35 officers that cover the incorporated City of Zephyrhills. In September 2020, Pasco County Fire Rescue took over all fire and rescue service responsibilities for the City of Zephyrhills.

== Health care ==
AdventHealth Zephyrhills is the only hospital.

== Notable people ==
- Domonic Brown, baseball player
- Dave Eiland, former Major League Baseball pitcher
- Kenneth Junior French, Mass murderer
- Bobby Geudert, soccer player (died in Zephyrhills)
- Prince Iaukea, pro wrestler (born Michael Hayner)
- Ramiele Malubay, American Idol finalist (attended Zephyrhills High School until 2002)
- Jessica Meuse, American Idol finalist, briefly lived in Zephyrhills
- Tracy Negoshian, fashion designer
- Stephen Perry, writer for the animated series ThunderCats and SilverHawks
- Ryan Pickett, defensive tackle for the Green Bay Packers, graduated from Zephyrhills High School in 1998
- Buzzie Reutimann, race car driver
- David Reutimann, NASCAR Sprint Cup Series race winner and son of Buzzie Reutimann.

== See also ==
- List of sundown towns in the United States
