= Fivay High School =

Location
- 12115 Chicago Avenue; Hudson, Florida; United States; 28.333617°N 82.658169°W

Information
- Type: Public
- Established: August 16, 2010; 16 years ago
- School district: Pasco County
- Principal: Erik Hermansen
- Teaching staff: 78.00 (FTE)
- Grades: 9 to 12
- Enrollment: 1,634 (2023–2024)
- Student to teacher ratio: 20.95
- Colors: Navy; Red; Silver
- Athletics: Baseball, Basketball, Cheerleading, Cross Country, Football, Soccer, Softball, Swimming, Tennis, Track, Volleyball, Weightlifting, Wrestling
- Athletics conference: Sunshine Athletic Conference (SAC)
- Mascot: Falcon
- Team name: Falcons
- Rival: Hudson High School
- Yearbook: Wingspan
- Website: fhs.pasco.k12.fl.us

Fivay High School is a public high school located in Pasco County, Florida, located on State Road 52. Opened on August 16, 2010, the school was built for 1,870 students from Hudson High School, Ridgewood High School, and River Ridge High School which had been experiencing overcrowding.

== Naming ==
Originally, the school was merely designed EEE. The school was named by David Chauncey, a student columnist for the Suncoast News and a Ridgewood High School graduate, in an op-ed piece after the Pasco County Public School Board requested that citizens provide ideas for the new high school's name. The school was named after a small town founded on the banks of Bear Creek — very close to the location of the new high school — around the year 1904 by five men from Atlanta who all had last names that started with an 'A.'

Fivay was the largest sawmill (or one of the largest) in Florida during its peak and had a population of nearly 2,500 with what is now State Route 52 serving as a railroad right of way for the town. Before the school, the only landmark to the old town was Fivay Road which is feet from the Little Road entrance for the school. In 1914, the mill ceased operations and the town was deserted with the exception of 10 families that tried to make it work, but they were unsuccessful. Over time all signs of the once bustling town were removed. The name was officially submitted by Chauncey to the school board to be considered. On September 16, 2009, the name was approved by the school board and West Pasco's seventh high school came into existence.

== Incorporated three schools ==
Fivay High School was designed by Florida-based architecture firm Harvard Jolly. The new school was deemed necessary due to the overcrowding of the other schools in the area especially Ridgewood High School which was at nearly 140% of its intended capacity in 2003–2004. The school plan was reduced to two stories from three and the football field relocated from the back of the school to a site along the road after objections from neighbors. There was much angst and tension amongst parents of the three well established high schools in the region on what areas would be incorporated into the new school's district. Principal Angie Stone was named the first principal after previously opening up Sunlake High School in 2007 as their first principal.
