= Land O' Lakes High School =

Coordinates: 28.262835°N 82.479569°W

Location
- 20325 Gator Lane; Land O' Lakes, Pasco County, Florida; United States

Information
- Type: Public high school
- Established: July 3, 1975; 51 years ago
- School district: Pasco County Schools
- Principal: Cheryl Macri
- Teaching staff: 92.40 (FTE)
- Grades: 9-12
- Enrollment: 2,278 (2023–2024)
- Student to teacher ratio: 24.65
- Colors: Navy Blue and Gold
- Mascot: Fighting Gator
- Nickname: Lando
- Rival: Sunlake High School
- Yearbook: Alligate
- Website: lolhs.pasco.k12.fl.us

Land O' Lakes High School (LOLHS) is a four-year public high school in Land O' Lakes, Florida. It is a part of the Pasco County Schools district in Pasco County. The school’s mascot is the Fighting Gator.

== History ==
The construction of Land O' Lakes High School began in 1973. Leroy McClain was named principal and began hiring staff. Because of critical overcrowding across the county due to a population jump, classes were held in double sessions at nearby Sanders Memorial Elementary School while the school was being built. When the school finally opened two years later, it served 1,400 students in grades 7 through 12. Five years later, Pine View Middle School was built to hold grades 6 through 8.

In 1996, Pasco County began implementing the first in a series of Philadelphia Model career academies, which the District called Learning Communities. Land O' Lakes High School started one of these, called the Academy of Business Technology (ABT). ABT started with ninth grade and employed integrated curricular instruction and real-life business contexts to teach college-level academics as well as job skills. Thompson later became Executive Director of the National Educator Program (NEP), implementing career academies like ABT throughout the United States and the first ever in Afghanistan, China and Uganda.

From 2003 to 2007, Land O' Lakes operated on a 10-period bell schedule to ease crowding with most freshmen attending classes from 10:25 AM to 4:45 PM and sophomores, juniors and seniors attending from 7:35 a.m. to 2 p.m. This was discontinued in 2007, when Sunlake High School opened.

The class of 2008 was the largest in the school's history, with nearly 600 graduates.

Ric Mellin, formerly the principal of J.W. Mitchell High School, became Land O' Lakes' sixth principal in March 2009. He replaced Monica Ilse, who was appointed principal of the new Anclote High School in Holiday, Florida (opened in August 2009).

In 2012, the school hosted a rally for Republican presidential candidate Mitt Romney, which attracted 15,000 people.

The school was remodeled during the 2017–18 school year, and renovations were completed in the 2019–2020 school year, with the school administration holding a "Grand Reopening" dedication ceremony.

LOLHS houses approximately 2,265 students in grades 9 through 12.

=== List of principals ===
No.	Name	From	To	Ref.
1	Leroy McClain	1975	1985	
2	Albert Bashaw	1985	1997	
3	Max Ramos	1997	2003	
4	Ray Bonti	2003	2006	
5	Monica Ilse	2006	2009	
6	Ric Mellin	2009	2025	
7	Cheryl Macri	2025	Present	

== Academics ==
=== Recognition ===
In 2005, the school received a grade of A from the state of Florida for the first time. It was also the first time a high school in Pasco County received the ranking. That same year, the school was ranked as number 312 on a list of the top 1,000 high schools in the country in an issue of Newsweek magazine. In 2006 and 2007, the school kept its A grade and remained on Newsweek's annual list of the top high schools. In 2008, the school again remained on the list. The school also received an A grade for 2009.

In 2012, Land O' Lakes High School renamed its football stadium after coach John Benedetto, who led the Gators to 14 consecutive state playoffs.

In 2012, Land O' Lakes' graduation rate was 91% as compared to a statewide rate of 86.9% and a Hillsborough County rate of 86.2%.

On December 17, 2022, the school's gymnasium was renamed the David Puhalski Gymnasium, naming after a longtime coach at the school.

=== International baccalaureate ===
Land O' Lakes is one of two high schools in Pasco County to offer the IB Diploma Programme. High school students in Central and East Pasco attend Land O' Lakes for this program. IB is also offered at Gulf High School for students in West Pasco.

== Controversies ==
=== 2007 attendance policy controversy ===
In 2007, more than 100 juniors and seniors were banned from attending prom due to an attendance policy that states that if students have more than six absences in a quarter, or ten in a semester, they will lose the privilege of participating in extracurricular activities. This is a district rule enforced by all other schools in Pasco County. Many students affected by this rule claimed that it had not been enforced before, and they had been allowed to attend homecoming, even with excessive absences. They tried to start a petition and tried to organize their own prom.

== Notable alumni ==
- Jeff Baisley, baseball player drafted by Oakland Athletics in 2005 out of the University of South Florida
- Stacy Bishop, formal professional soccer player for the Atlanta Beat
- Cory Doyne, former MLB player for the Baltimore Orioles
- Jason Garcia, current MLB pitcher who is a free agent.
- Logan Payne, wide receiver for the Baltimore Ravens
- Derek Thompson, baseball player drafted by the Cleveland Indians in the 1st round of the 2000 Major League Baseball Draft
- Drew Weatherford, class of 2004; named all-American by ESPN in November, 2006; former starting quarterback for Florida State University; former quarterback for Tampa Bay Storm
- Will W. Weatherford, State of Florida House of Representatives
- Kevin Temmer, YouTube animator and musician notable for lead animator role in Glitch Productions on The Amazing Digital Circus and Murder Drones.
