= Anthony Kendall =

American football player (born 1999)

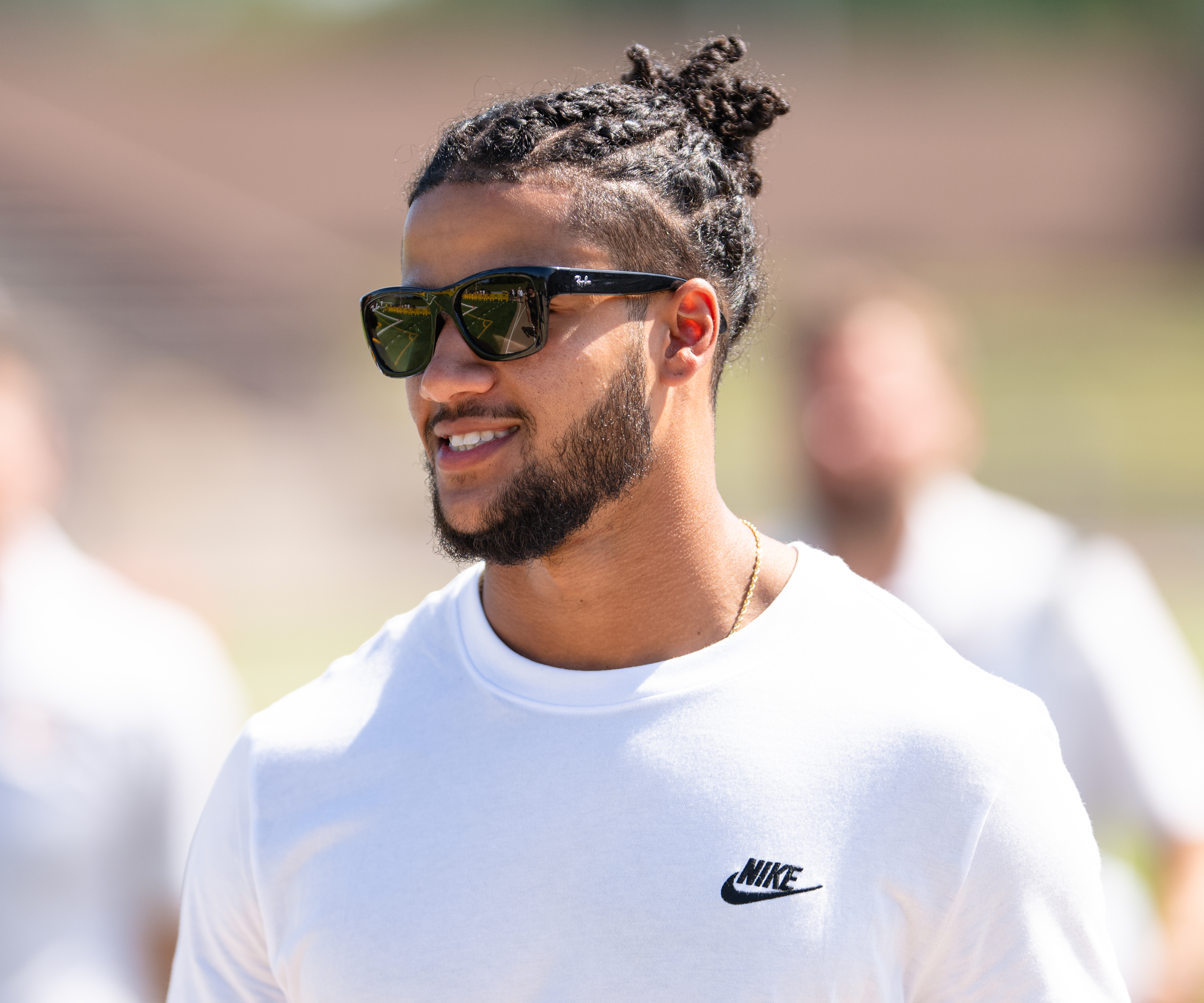
- Kendall in 2023

Profile
- Position: Cornerback

Personal information
- Born: December 17, 1999 (age 26); El Paso, Texas, U.S.
- Listed height: 5 ft 10 in (1.78 m)
- Listed weight: 188 lb (85 kg)

Career information
- High school: Anclote (Holiday, Florida); River Ridge (New Port Richey, Florida)
- College: Baldwin Wallace (2018–2022)
- NFL draft: 2023: undrafted

Career history
- Tennessee Titans (2023–2024); Baltimore Ravens (2024)*; Cleveland Browns (2025)*; Buffalo Bills (2026)
- * Offseason or practice squad member only

Awards and highlights
- Second-team DIII All-American (2022); First-team All-OAC (2022)

Career NFL statistics as of Week 5, 2026
- Total tackles: 12
- Stats at Pro Football Reference

Anthony Kendall (born December 17, 1999) is an American professional football cornerback. He played college football for the Baldwin Wallace Yellow Jackets and was signed by the Tennessee Titans as an undrafted free agent after the 2023 NFL draft.

== Early life and college ==
Kendall was born on December 17, 1999, in El Paso, Texas. He attended Anclote High School before transferring to River Ridge High School, playing football in all four years while also being a member of the track, basketball and weightlifting teams. He received no offers to play Division I college football and began playing for the Division III Baldwin Wallace Yellow Jackets college football team in 2018, ultimately spending five seasons with them.

As a freshman, Kendall played seven games, totaling 23 tackles, and he posted the same number of tackles in 2019 while appearing in five games. In the COVID-19-shortened spring 2021 season, he played two games and was named honorable mention all-conference with 13 tackles. In the fall 2021 season, Kendall played seven games and had 11 tackles. He had his best season as a senior in 2022, having 56 tackles and three interceptions while being named All-American and the conference's defensive back of the year.

== Professional career ==
Pre-draft measurables
| Height | Weight | Arm length | Hand span | Wingspan | 40-yard dash | 10-yard split | 20-yard split | 20-yard shuttle | Three-cone drill | Vertical jump | Broad jump | Bench press |
|---|---|---|---|---|---|---|---|---|---|---|---|---|
| 5 ft 10 1/8 in (1.78 m) | 177 lb (80 kg) | 30 7/8 in (0.78 m) | 9 1/2 in (0.24 m) | 6 ft 2 1/2 in (1.89 m) | 4.53 s | 1.69 s | 2.59 s | 4.44 s | 7.02 s | 38.5 in (0.98 m) | 10 ft 9 in (3.28 m) | 19 reps |
All values from Pro Day

=== Tennessee Titans ===
Kendall was invited to no college all-star games or the NFL Scouting Combine, but impressed at his pro day and was signed by the Tennessee Titans as an undrafted free agent, being the first from his school to earn a contract since 2011. He made the team's final roster and with his debut in week one became the first Baldwin Wallace alumni to play in the NFL since 1987.

Kendall was waived by the Titans on August 27, 2024, and re-signed to the practice squad. He was released on October 10.

=== Baltimore Ravens ===
On October 16, 2024, Kendall signed with the Baltimore Ravens' practice squad.

=== Cleveland Browns ===
On February 24, 2025, Kendall signed with the Cleveland Browns. He was waived with an injury designation on August 5.

=== Buffalo Bills ===
On August 12, 2026, Kendall signed a one-year contract with the Buffalo Bills. He was released by the Bills on August 30 as a part of final roster cuts before being re-signed to the practice squad the following day. On October 12, Kendall was signed to the active roster, but was waived the next day and re-signed back to the practice squad. On October 27, he was released.
