= Ethan Petry =

American baseball player (born 2004)

Washington Nationals
- Outfielder
- Born: June 17, 2004 (age 22); Land o' Lakes, Florida, U.S.
- Bats: Right Throws: Right
- Stats at Baseball Reference

Ethan Matthew Petry (born June 17, 2004) is an American professional baseball outfielder in the Washington Nationals organization.

== Amateur career ==
Petry grew up in Land o' Lakes, Florida and attended Cypress Creek High School in Wesley Chapel, Florida. Over the course of his high school career he batted .402 with 29 doubles and 12 home runs with 80 RBIs. Petry was also a pitcher and posted a 5-2 record with a 1.97 ERA and 60 strikeouts as a senior. He committed to play college baseball at South Carolina.

Petry was an immediate starter for the South Carolina Gamecocks during his freshman year in 2023. He was named first-team All-SEC after batting .376 with 23 home runs and 75 RBIs in his first season. After the season, Petry played collegiate summer baseball for the Lexington County Blowfish of the Coastal Plain League. In 2024, he batted .308 with 21 home runs, 53 RBIs and 57 runs scored as a sophomore. Petry played for the Yarmouth–Dennis Red Sox of the Cape Cod Baseball League (CCBL) in the summer, where he was named both the CCBL MVP and the Outstanding Pro Prospect after batting .360 with 11 home runs, 25 RBIs and a league-hit 18 extra-base hits. In 2025 with South Carolina, Petry played in 44 games and hit .321 with ten home runs and 34 RBIs, his season ending prematurely with a shoulder injury.

== Professional career ==
Petry was selected by the Washington Nationals in the second round with the 49th overall pick of the 2025 Major League Baseball draft. He signed with the team for $2.09 million.

Petry made his professional debut after signing with the Single-A Fredericksburg Nationals and hit .287 with two home runs across 24 games. He opened the 2026 season with the High-A Wilmington Blue Rocks and was promoted to the Double-A Harrisburg Senators in June.

== Personal life ==
Petry's older brother, Peyton, plays college baseball at Saint Leo University.
