= Albert Ritzhaupt =

American professor (born 1980)

Albert D. Ritzhaupt
- Born: Albert Dieter Ritzhaupt; 1980 (age 45–46); Dunedin, Florida, Florida, US
- Title: Professor
- Awards: FERA Educational Researcher of the Year (2019)

Academic background
- Education: University of South Florida; University of North Florida; Valencia College
- Doctoral advisor: Dr. Ann E. Barron

Academic work
- Discipline: Education
- Sub-discipline: Educational Technology; Computer Science Education
- Institutions: University of Florida; University of North Carolina Wilmington; University of North Florida

Albert Dieter Ritzhaupt (born in 1980) is an American educational researcher, author, professor of educational technology and computer science education at the University of Florida, where he has served since 2010. Ritzhaupt serves as the current Editor-in-Chief of the Journal of Research on Technology in Education since 2018, the official research publication of the International Society for Technology in Education. Ritzhaupt is a member of the Institute for Advanced Learning Technologies, research member of the Florida Center for Instructional Technology, and President for the International Board of Standards for Training, Performance, and Instruction (IBSTPI). Ritzhaupt was identified as one of the world's most prolific scholarly authors in the field of educational technology from 2007 to 2017 and again in 2021 for research articles between 2015 and 2019.

== Early life and education ==
Ritzhaupt was born in Dunedin, Florida in 1980 and was raised in Port Richey, Florida. His parents owned a restaurant in Port Richey, Florida called Seaport Inn until its closure in 1998. Ritzhaupt attended Ridgewood High School in New Port Richey, Florida, which was later renamed Wendall Krinn Technical High School. After graduation in 1999, Ritzhaupt attended Valencia College for his associate of arts, the University of North Florida for his bachelor of science in computer and information sciences in 2003 and master of business administration in 2004, and the University of South Florida for his doctor of philosophy (Ph.D.) in curriculum and instruction with a major in instructional technology and a minor in research and measurement in 2008.

== Professional life and accolades ==
Ritzhaupt has served at multiple institutions of higher education teaching and researching full-time in the fields of educational technology and computer science education since 2006, including St. Johns River State College, University of North Florida, University of North Carolina Wilmington, and University of Florida. Ritzhaupt previously worked as a software developer for several organizations prior to starting his tenure-track academic career. Ritzhaupt has served as both a Director and Past-President of the Florida Educational Research Association (FERA), and in 2019, was selected as the Educational Researcher of the Year Award by FERA. Ritzhaupt has published more than 100 scholarly journal articles in the fields of educational technology and computer science education. Ritzhaupt was awarded the 2016 UF Research Foundation Professors distinction, a term-limited professorship awarded to tenured professors who have a distinguished current record of research at the University of Florida. Ritzhaupt was distinguished as an alumnus of Distinction from his alma mater Valencia College in 2016. Ritzhaupt presently serves as the program coordinator for the computer science education program at the University of Florida.
