= Sunlake High School =

Coordinates: 28.202714°N 82.505543°W

- 3023 Sunlake Boulevard; Land O' Lakes, Florida 34638

Information
- Type: Public
- Established: August 20, 2007; 19 years ago
- Principal: Kara Merlin
- Staff: 99.20 (FTE)
- Enrollment: 2,192 (2023–2024)
- Student to teacher ratio: 22.10
- Colors: Teal, black and gold
- Mascot: Seahawks
- Website: slhs.pasco.k12.fl.us

Sunlake High School is a public high school in Pasco County, Florida, located off Sunlake Boulevard and State Road 54 in Land O' Lakes, Florida. It is adjacent to Charles S. Rushe Middle School, both of which opened on August 20, 2007.

Sunlake did not open with a senior class. It relieved overcrowding at Land O' Lakes High School and J.W. Mitchell High School. By the 2008–09 school year, Sunlake students formed all four classes, 9th–12th grades. Its first principal was Angela Stone (2007–2010).

== Coursework and academics ==
Sunlake is one of the few high schools in the county that offer a dual-enrollment English class. It also offers a complete set of Advanced Placement (AP) classes in the social studies field, beginning with AP Human Geography in 9th grade, AP World History in 10th, AP US History in 11th, AP Microeconomics and AP Government in 12th grade.

The school is organized into learning communities that are designed to enhance the curriculum and student performance by linking teaching and learning to broad career clusters. This "school within a school" concept establishes smaller groups of students and teachers, providing more opportunities for better relationships among students, parents, and teachers. The learning communities are Health & Human Services, Science & Technology, Business, and Fine Arts. Students choose a major area of interest that can be changed in any or all four years of high school. This plan has been put into effect in all Pasco County high schools.

== Athletics ==
The Seahawks football team's inaugural season was winless. In the first game of their second season, however, they defeated River Ridge High School by a score of 19–10 on September 5, 2008.

During the 2011-2012 football season (11–1), this highly talented Sunlake team advanced to its first state playoffs. They won in the first round of the playoffs in double overtime versus an Ocala Vanguard team who had former Florida State standout and former New Orleans Saint PJ Williams. The season did came to an end with a lost to Gainesville High School in the 2nd round. Some notable Sunlake Football players include Rashaud Daniels, Eddie Burgos, Jamal Jones, Nick Morrison, and *Tyler Gafflione (Kentucky derby jockey).

Sunlake has had a very strong cross-country team throughout its history, with the team consistently going to state and regional championship competitions.

The Sunlake girls golf team has won back to back conference titles and consistently places first in regular season matches. During their 2021–22 season, they placed in the top 10 at state.

The Sunlake girls' basketball has won 6 District titles, [2016-2017-2018-2019, 2025-2026], has appeared 6 times in the state tournament round of 32, 3 times in the sweet 16, and the Elite 8 (2017–2018–2026).
