= Logan Payne =

American football player (born 1985)

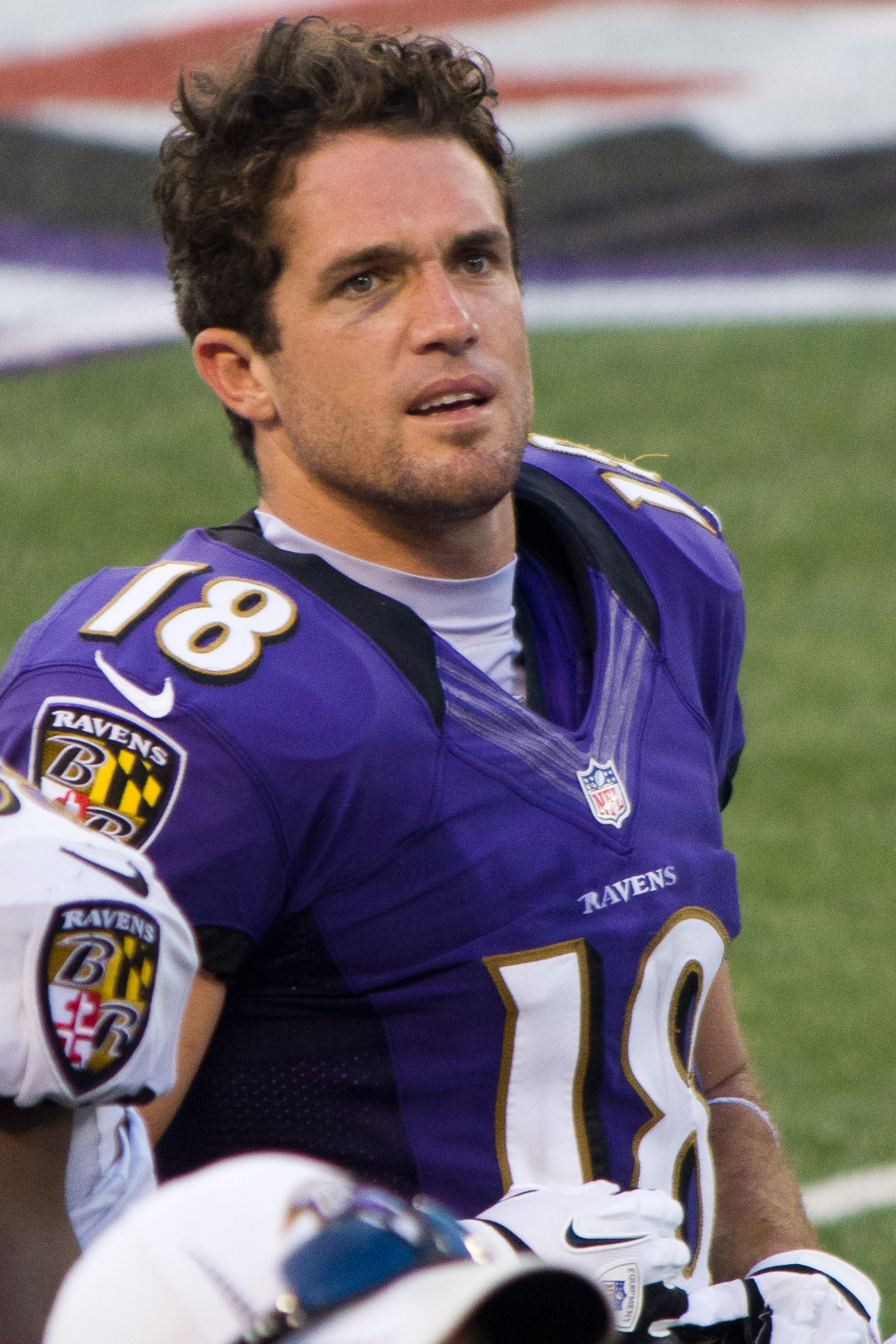
- Logan Payne at Ravens M&T Bank Stadium practice in August 2012.

No. 19
- Position: Wide receiver

Personal information
- Born: January 21, 1985 (age 41); Tampa, Florida, U.S.
- Listed height: 6 ft 2 in (1.88 m)
- Listed weight: 205 lb (93 kg)

Career information
- High school: Land o' Lakes (Land O' Lakes, Florida)
- College: Minnesota
- NFL draft: 2007: undrafted

Career history
- Seattle Seahawks (2007–2009); Detroit Lions (2009)*; Kansas City Chiefs (2009)*; Minnesota Vikings (2010)*; New York Jets (2010–2011); Baltimore Ravens (2012)*
- * Offseason or practice squad member only

Career NFL statistics
- Receptions: 3
- Receiving yards: 39
- Stats at Pro Football Reference

Logan Payne (born January 21, 1985) is an American former professional football player who was a wide receiver in the National Football League (NFL). He played college football for the Minnesota Golden Gophers and was signed by the Seattle Seahawks as an undrafted free agent in 2007.

Payne was also a member of the Baltimore Ravens, Detroit Lions, Kansas City Chiefs, Minnesota Vikings, and New York Jets.

== Early life ==
Payne attended Land o' Lakes High School in Land o' Lakes, Florida, where he lettered in football, basketball, and baseball. In football, he was a two-time all-county selection, and as a senior, was named the County Player of the Year, Area Player of the Year. He also was an all-state selection. Payne accumulated 109 receptions for 1,650 yards and 30 touchdowns in his high school career. As a senior, he had 74 receptions for 1,250 yards and 23 touchdowns. He also played defensive back, intercepting two passes his senior season and eight in his career. Payne was also the basketball team's most valuable player.

== College career ==
Payne played in 46 career games for the University of Minnesota, catching 97 passes for 1,344 yards and 11 touchdowns. He posted career highs in catches (59), yards (804) and touchdowns (9) during his senior year for the Golden Gophers, leading the team in all three categories. As a junior, he recorded 37 catches for 529 yards and two touchdowns.

== Professional career ==
=== Seattle Seahawks ===
Payne was signed by Seattle as an undrafted rookie free agent on May 2, 2007, and spent the entire regular season on the practice squad. He was signed to the active roster on January 1, 2008, during the postseason, but was inactive for both Seahawks' playoff games.

In 2008, Payne made Seattle's 53-man roster on opening day after injuries depleted the Seahawks' receiving corps, sidelining Deion Branch, Bobby Engram, and Ben Obomanu. He caught two passes for 25 yards in the Seahawks' season opener against the Buffalo Bills. However, in week 2 against the San Francisco 49ers, Payne suffered a torn medial collateral ligament in his right knee while leaping to catch a 14-yard pass, and was tackled by 49ers' safety Dashon Goldson. He was placed on injured reserve on September 15, 2008, and missed the rest of the 2008 season. The Seahawks cut him from the practice squad on October 1, 2009.

=== Detroit Lions ===
On October 8, 2009, he was signed to the Detroit Lions practice squad. On Oct. 12, 2009, he was released from the Lions practice squad.

=== Kansas City Chiefs ===
Payne was signed to the practice squad of the Kansas City Chiefs on December 23, 2009.

=== Minnesota Vikings ===
Payne signed with Minnesota on May 21, 2010. Payne was released on September 4, 2010, as part of final cuts prior to the start of the 2010 NFL Season. Payne was subsequently re-signed to the Vikings practice squad on September 6. Payne was released from the practice squad on October 7 with the Vikings trading a third round draft pick to the New England Patriots for former Vikings Pro Bowl wide-receiver Randy Moss and to make room for offensive tackle Andrew Gardner on the practice squad. Payne wore jersey #84 which is the same number Moss wore during his time in Minnesota, and has since resumed wearing since his trade back to the Vikings.

=== New York Jets ===
Payne was signed to the New York Jets' practice squad on October 9. He was placed on the injured reserve list on October 22, 2011, after dislocating his wrist during the preseason. Payne was waived by the Jets on May 1, 2012.

=== Baltimore Ravens ===
On July 26, 2012, Payne signed with the Baltimore Ravens.
