= Brendan Daly (American football) =

American football coach (born 1975)

Kansas City Chiefs
- Title: Linebackers coach

Personal information
- Born: September 10, 1975 (age 51)

Career information
- High school: Springfield (IL) Sacred Heart-Griffin
- College: Drake

Career history
- Ridgewood HS (1997) Offensive & defensive line coach; Drake (1998) Tight ends coach; Villanova (1999) Tight ends coach; Maryland (2000) Graduate assistant; Oklahoma State (2001–2002) Graduate assistant; Oklahoma State (2003) Assistant strength and conditioning coach; Illinois State (2004) Tight ends coach; Villanova (2005) Defensive line coach; Minnesota Vikings (2006–2008) Assistant defensive line coach; St. Louis Rams (2009–2011) Defensive line coach; Minnesota Vikings (2012–2013) Defensive line coach; New England Patriots (2014) Defensive assistant; New England Patriots (2015–2018) Defensive line coach; Kansas City Chiefs (2019–2021) Run game coordinator/defensive line coach; Kansas City Chiefs (2022–present) Linebackers coach

Awards and highlights
- 6× Super Bowl champion (XLIX, LI, LIII, LIV, LVII, LVIII)

Brendan Daly (born September 10, 1975) is an American football coach who is the linebackers coach for the Kansas City Chiefs of the National Football League (NFL). Daly previously served as a defensive line coach for the Minnesota Vikings, St. Louis Rams and New England Patriots.

== Early life ==
Daly attended Sacred Heart-Griffin High School in Springfield, Illinois and earned his bachelor's degree in history from Drake University in Des Moines, Iowa.

== Coaching career ==
=== Ridgewood High School ===
In 1997, Daly received his first coaching position as an offensive and defensive line coach at Ridgewood High School in New Port Richey, Florida.

=== Drake ===
In 1998, Daly was hired as a tight ends coach at Drake, his alma mater.

=== Villanova (first stint) ===
In 1999, Daly was hired as a tight ends coach at Villanova. The 1999 Wildcats went 7–4 and Talley posted his 100th victory at the school.

=== Maryland ===
In 2000, Daly was hired as an offensive graduate assistant at Maryland. This was Daly's first exposure to major Division I football and he worked with the tight ends.

=== Oklahoma State ===
In 2001, Daly was hired as a graduate assistant at Oklahoma State. Throughout his time at Oklahoma State, Daly worked on both sides of the ball. He was promoted to assistant strength and conditioning coach in 2003.

=== Illinois State ===
In 2004, Daly was hired as a tight ends coach at Illinois State. He coached the tight ends at Division I-AA Illinois State when the Redbirds led the Gateway Conference in passing offense.

=== Villanova (second stint) ===
In 2005, Daly returned to Villanova as their defensive line coach.

=== Minnesota Vikings (first stint) ===
In 2006, Daly was hired by the Minnesota Vikings to be their assistant defensive line coach.

=== St. Louis Rams ===
In 2009, Daly was hired by the St. Louis Rams to be their defensive line coach.

=== Minnesota Vikings (second stint) ===
In 2012, Daly returned to the Vikings after he was hired to be their defensive line coach.

=== New England Patriots ===
In 2014, Daly was hired by the New England Patriots as a defensive assistant. Daly won his first Super Bowl ring when the Patriots defeated the Seattle Seahawks in Super Bowl XLIX by a score of 28–24. He was promoted to defensive line coach ahead of the 2015 season. Daly was part of the Patriots coaching staff that won Super Bowl LI on February 5, 2017. In the game, the Patriots defeated the Atlanta Falcons by a score of 34–28 in overtime. The Patriots made it Super Bowl LII, but were defeated by the Philadelphia Eagles 41–33. Daly won his third Super Bowl when the Patriots defeated the Los Angeles Rams 13–3 in Super Bowl LIII. It was the lowest scoring Super Bowl ever.

=== Kansas City Chiefs ===
On February 9, 2019, Daly was hired by the Kansas City Chiefs as their defensive line coach. In his first season with the Chiefs, Daly won Super Bowl LIV against the San Francisco 49ers 31–20 to give Daly his fourth Super Bowl championship. In 2020, Daly coached in his fifth straight Super Bowl, but the Chiefs lost 31–9 to the Tampa Bay Buccaneers in Super Bowl LV. Following the conclusion of the 2021 season, Daly was moved to linebackers coach. In 2022, Daly won his fifth Super Bowl ring when the Chiefs defeated the Philadelphia Eagles 38–35 in Super Bowl LVII. In 2023, Daly won his sixth Super Bowl ring when the Chiefs defeated the San Francisco 49ers 25–22 in Super Bowl LVIII. In 2024, Daly coached in his ninth Super Bowl but the Chiefs lost 40–22 to the Eagles.
