= Patrick Schuster =

American baseball player (born 1990)

- Pitcher
- Born: October 30, 1990 (age 35); Holiday, Florida, U.S.
- Batted: Right Threw: Left

MLB debut
- July 5, 2016, for the Oakland Athletics

Last MLB appearance
- October 1, 2016, for the Philadelphia Phillies

MLB statistics
- Win–loss record: 0–1
- Earned run average: 18.69
- Strikeouts: 8
- Stats at Baseball Reference

Teams
- Oakland Athletics (2016); Philadelphia Phillies (2016)

Patrick James Schuster (born October 30, 1990) is an American former professional baseball pitcher. He played in Major League Baseball (MLB) for the Oakland Athletics and Philadelphia Phillies.

Before beginning his professional career, Schuster attended J. W. Mitchell High School in New Port Richey, Florida, and starred for their baseball team. Selected by the Arizona Diamondbacks in the 2009 MLB draft, the San Diego Padres acquired him in the 2013 Rule 5 Draft. He was returned to the Diamondbacks before the season began.

== Career ==
=== Arizona Diamondbacks ===
Schuster attended J. W. Mitchell High School in New Port Richey, Florida. He played for the school's baseball team as a pitcher. On April 15, 2008, Schuster tied a 51-year-old Pasco County record by striking out 20 batters in one game. In April 2009. Schuster threw four consecutive no-hitters for Mitchell's baseball team, a Florida state record. He committed to attend the University of Florida on a scholarship to play college baseball for the Florida Gators baseball team. Baseball America rated Schuster as the 79th best prospect in the nation.

The Arizona Diamondbacks selected Schuster in the 13th round of the 2009 Major League Baseball draft. Schuster signed with the Diamondbacks for a reported $450,000 signing bonus, forgoing his commitment to the University of Florida. He began his professional career as a starting pitcher, but transitioned to relief in 2012. In the 2013 season, he pitched for the Visalia Rawhide of the High–A California League.

Schuster was chosen by the Houston Astros with the first selection of the 2013 Rule 5 draft on December 12, 2013. He was immediately sent to the San Diego Padres as the player to be named later in the trade of Anthony Bass to the Astros from the previous day. After competing for a spot in the Padres' bullpen, Schuster was cut by the Padres on March 24 and put through waivers. He was claimed by the Kansas City Royals the next day. According to team sources, the Royals claimed Schuster in order to designate Carlos Peguero for assignment, with the hope that Peguero would pass through waivers. He was returned to the Diamondbacks before the season.

Back with the Diamondbacks, Schuster began the 2014 season with the Mobile BayBears of the Double–A Southern League, and was promoted to the Reno Aces of the Triple–A Pacific Coast League (PCL) in July. Schuster began the 2015 season with Mobile, and he pitched to a 3.24 ERA in 25 innings.

=== Cincinnati Reds ===
On June 23, 2015, the Cincinnati Reds acquired Schuster, who assigned him to the Pensacola Blue Wahoos of the Southern League.

=== Oakland Athletics ===
A free agent after the 2015 season, Schuster signed a minor league contract with the Oakland Athletics in November 2015. They invited him to spring training, and assigned him to the Nashville Sounds of the PCL to start the 2016 season. Schuster had a 1.30 ERA with 37 strikeouts in 28 games for Nashville, and the Athletics promoted him to the major leagues on July 4. The Athletics optioned Schuster back to Nashville on July 21, and recalled him on August 6. On August 10, the Athletics designated Schuster for assignment.

=== Philadelphia Phillies ===
On August 12, 2016, the Philadelphia Phillies claimed Schuster off of waivers and optioned him to the Lehigh Valley IronPigs of the Triple–A International League. In 6 appearances for Philadelphia, he struggled to a 45.00 ERA with 2 strikeouts across 2 innings pitched. On October 7, Schuster was removed from the 40-man roster and sent outright to Triple-A Lehigh Valley. He elected free agency on October 10.

=== Los Angeles Dodgers ===
On November 7, 2016, Schuster signed a minor league deal with the Los Angeles Dodgers and was assigned to the Triple-A Oklahoma City Dodgers to begin the 2017 season. He appeared in 17 games for Oklahoma City, with a 6.16 ERA and was released on June 15.

=== Oakland Athletics (second stint) ===
On June 17, 2017, Schuster signed a minor league contract with the Oakland Athletics organization. In 27 appearances for the Triple–A Nashville Sounds, he registered a 5.94 ERA with 40 strikeouts in 33 1/3 innings pitched. Schuster elected free agency following the season on November 6.

=== Sioux City Explorers ===
On March 19, 2018, Schuster signed with the Sioux City Explorers of the independent American Association.

=== Fargo-Moorhead RedHawks ===
On May 13, 2019, Schuster was traded to the Fargo-Moorhead RedHawks of the American Association. He was released by the RedHawks on September 2.

== See also ==
- Rule 5 draft results
