= Hungry Harry's Famous Barbecue =

Restaurant in Land o' Lakes, Florida, US

Coordinates: 28.2031°N 82.4630°W

Hungry Harry's Famous Barbecue is a barbecue restaurant in Land O' Lakes, Florida, United States. Established in 1985 on U.S. 41, it is considered a landmark and features in community celebrations and fundraisers. Owner Harry Wright serves on the board of the Suncoast Harvest Food Bank and was grand marshal of the community's annual Flapjack Festival parade in 2005.

The restaurant is on 5.8 acres including 350 feet of lake frontage. The business also operates a catering food truck business. and opened a location in Seffner in 2005. It was selected by a Land O' Lakes School as one of Land O' Lakes's "seven wonders" along with the Land O' Lakes Library, Land O' Lakes Recreation Center, Walmart, Target, Oakstead Elementary School, and the McDonald's with motorcycles in the play area. The St. Petersburg Times noted in 2010 that while Seffner was without a Starbucks or Panera Bread, the Hungry Harry's "just added 'red neck nachos' to the menu."
