= Land o' Lakes Flapjack Festival =

Festival in Land o' Lakes, Florida

Land o' Lakes Flapjack Festival was an annual tradition in the community of Land o' Lakes, Florida, first held in 1976. It included parade floats, a pageant, honorary mayor, and pancake eating (including pancake eating contests). It has been superseded by Swampfest, held in the first weekend of November.
