= Kirkland Ranch Academy of Innovation =

STEM 9-12 school in Wesley Chapel, Florida

Location
- 32555 Innovation Dr; Wesley Chapel, Florida 33545; 28°17′18″N 82°16′24″W

Information
- Opened: August 2022; 4 years ago
- School district: Pasco County
- Principal: DeeDee Castro
- Grades: 9–12
- Colors: Red and Gray

Kirkland Ranch Academy of Innovation (KRAI) is a four-year STEM high-school located in Wesley Chapel, Florida. KRAI is part of the Pasco County School District.

Kirkland Ranch is an East Pasco School Choice Magnet School, meaning students apply for attendance.

== Campus ==
Kirkland Ranch is a 184,000 square foot building situated on a 150-acre site, designed by Cannon Design and Hepner Architects. The building is two stories, and cost $70 million. In the same site, Kirkland Ranch K–8, KRAI's elementary and middle school, is being constructed.

== History ==
Constructed started in 2021, and constructed finished in 2022. The school opened for classes in August of the 2022–2023 school year with about 550 students. In the 2023–2024 school year KRAI had a total of about 720 students, an increase of 170 students the previous year.

== Pathways ==
Kirkland Ranch Academy of Innovation offers 10 pathways for its students to choose. Each student can take one pathway and each takes up about 1–2 classes a year.

- Applied Cybersecurity & Computer Science Principles
- Applied Robotics
- Automotive Maintenance and Light Repair
- Biomedical Sciences
- Building Trades and Construction Technology
- Diesel Maintenance Technology
- Electricity
- Multimedia Design
- Patient Care Technician
- Welding Technology Fundamentals

== List of principals ==
Year started	Year ended	Name
2022	Present	Danielle Castro
