= Dupree Gardens =

Botanical garden in Florida, US

Coordinates: 28.240754°N 82.448852°W

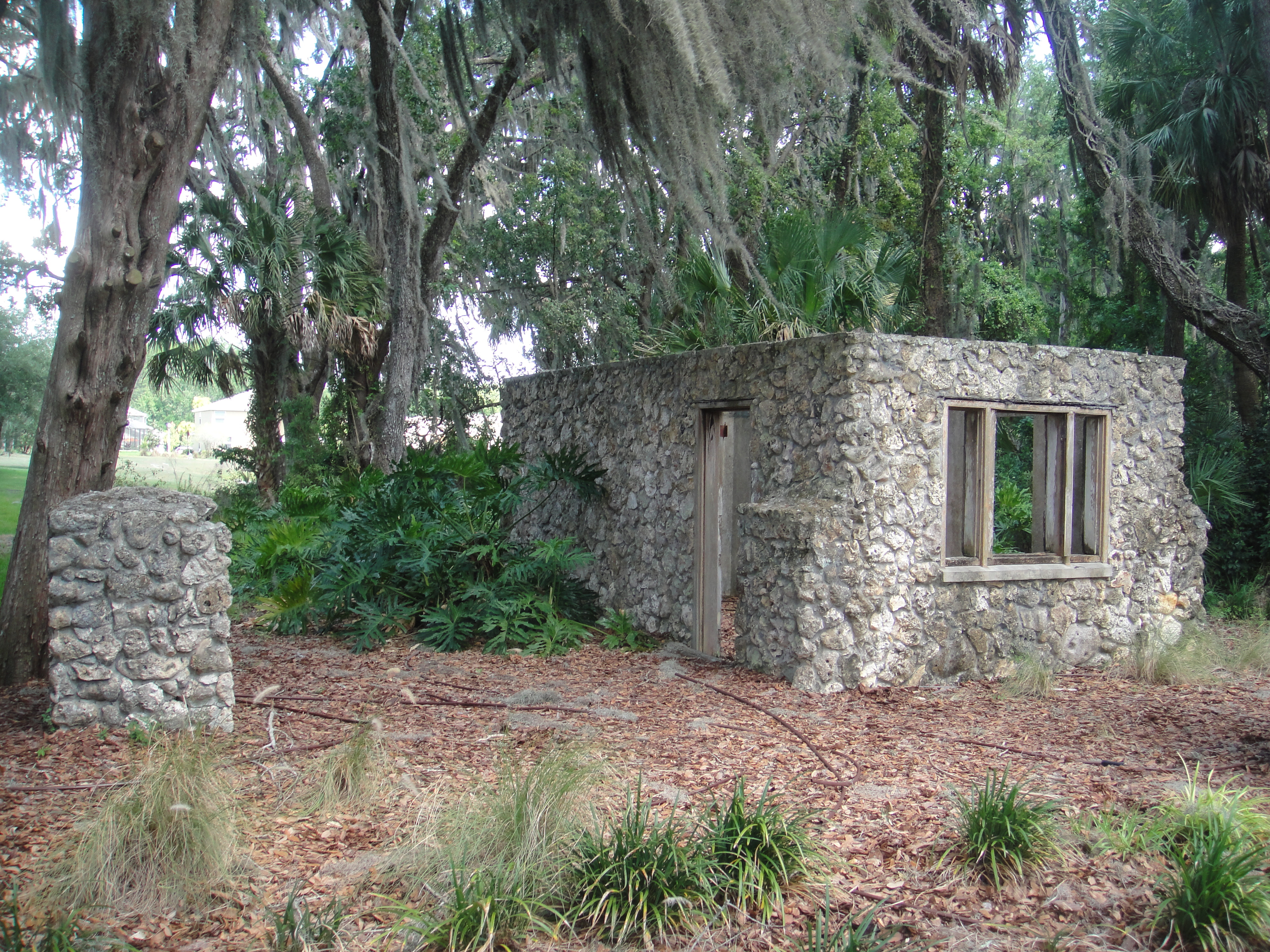
Dupree Gardens ruins

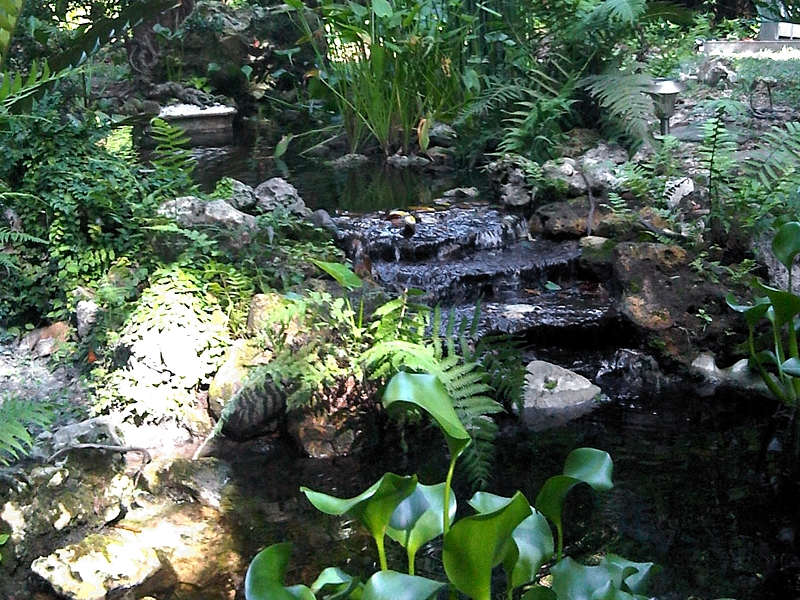
View of "Jasmine Waterfalls" separating 2 sections of the original Dupree Gardens ponds, restored to full functioning by Slaz & Laurence

Dupree Gardens was a private botanical garden, located 17 miles north of Tampa on Ehren Cutoff (Pasco CR 583), off US 41 in what is now Land O' Lakes, Florida, that was opened up to the public as a tourist attraction.

One of the first roadside attractions in the state, the 25-acre botanical garden was opened to the public on the first of December, 1940. Renowned as the “Blossom Center of Florida”, the garden received over 30,000 visitors per year until World War II gas and tire rationing restricted tourist traffic to Florida.

A 1948 American Automobile Association publication described the 900-acre estate as including "a beautiful 25-acre tropical garden with winding paths, meandering streams and sparkling waterfalls" and called it "one of Florida's major attractions". The gardens were also featured in other late 1940s and early 1950s guides. A historical marker, now located at the edge of a suburban housing development on Ehren Cutoff (Pasco CR 583), marks the original entrance of the road that once led to the 25-acre tropical botanical garden. The original stone ticket gate has been left standing.

In 2003, a project to restore a large portion of the original Dupree Gardens ponds, streams, and waterfalls was initiated by the design team of Amanda Slaz and David Laurence, owners of a section of the garden’s original 25 acres.
