= Tyler Clippard =

American baseball player (born 1985)

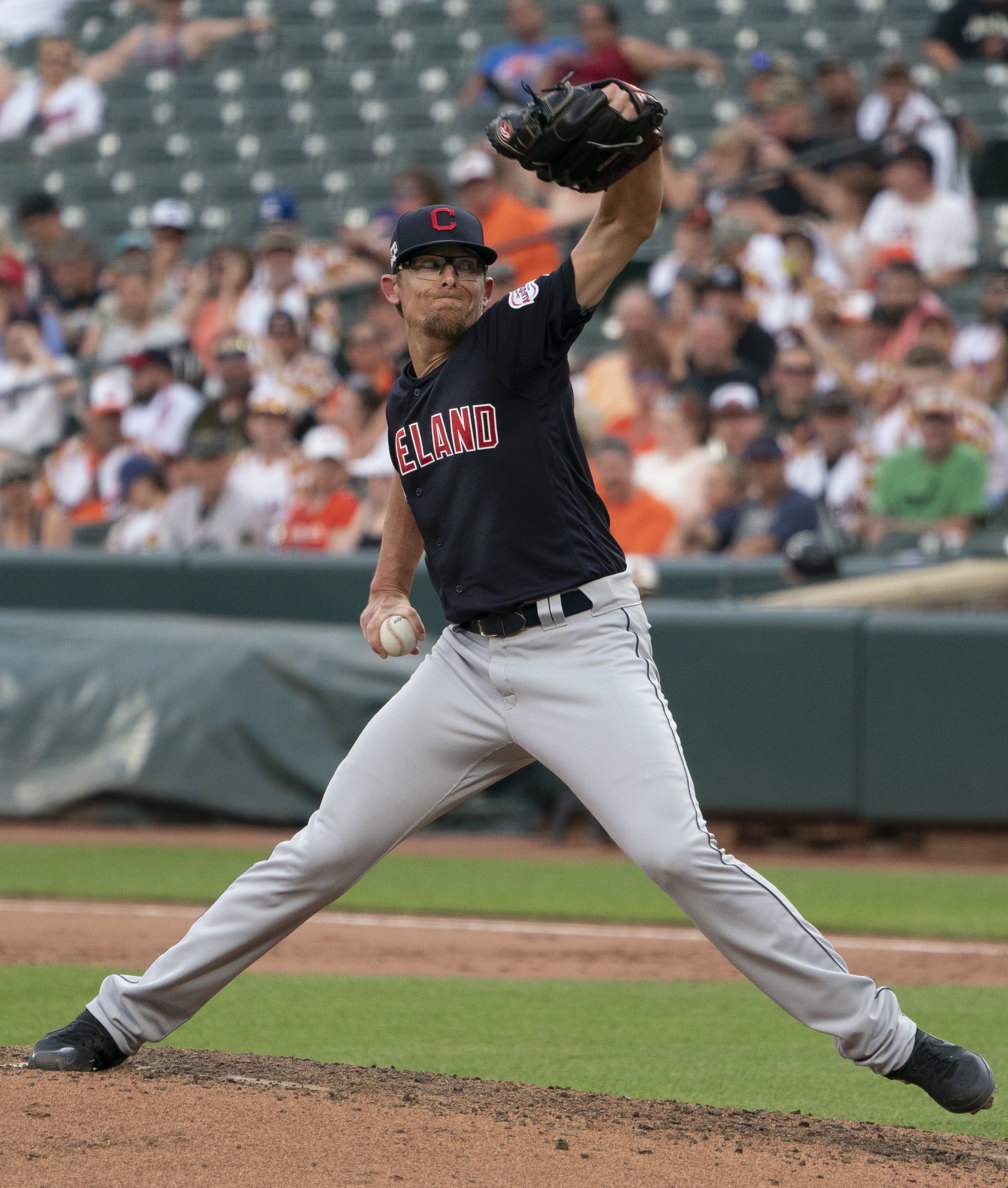
- Clippard with the Cleveland Indians in 2019
- Pitcher
- Born: February 14, 1985 (age 41); Lexington, Kentucky, U.S.
- Batted: Right Threw: Right

MLB debut
- May 20, 2007, for the New York Yankees

Last MLB appearance
- August 20, 2022, for the Washington Nationals

MLB statistics
- Win–loss record: 56–48
- Earned run average: 3.16
- Strikeouts: 956
- Saves: 74
- Stats at Baseball Reference

Teams
- New York Yankees (2007); Washington Nationals (2008–2014); Oakland Athletics (2015); New York Mets (2015); Arizona Diamondbacks (2016); New York Yankees (2016–2017); Chicago White Sox (2017); Houston Astros (2017); Toronto Blue Jays (2018); Cleveland Indians (2019); Minnesota Twins (2020); Arizona Diamondbacks (2021); Washington Nationals (2022)

Career highlights and awards
- 2× All-Star (2011, 2014)
Medals
Men's baseball
Representing United States
World Baseball Classic
Gold medal – first place	2017 Los Angeles	Team

Tyler Lee Clippard (born February 14, 1985) is an American former professional baseball pitcher. He played in Major League Baseball (MLB) for the New York Yankees, Washington Nationals, Oakland Athletics, New York Mets, Arizona Diamondbacks, Chicago White Sox, Houston Astros, Toronto Blue Jays, Cleveland Indians, and Minnesota Twins.

After playing baseball at J. W. Mitchell High School in New Port Richey, Florida, the Yankees drafted Clippard in the ninth round of the 2003 MLB draft. He debuted with the Yankees as a starting pitcher in 2007. After being traded to the Washington Nationals he was named to the MLB All-Star Game in 2011 and 2014 and won the MLB Delivery Man of the Month Award in June 2011.

== Amateur career ==
Clippard was born in Lexington, Kentucky. His family moved to Florida when he was a toddler. Clippard played baseball in Little League; in eleven years, he won seven district titles, but was never able to reach the Little League World Series. He learned to pitch when he was eight years old. In 2001, he was a member of the Palm Harbor team that won the Senior League World Series.

Clippard began his high school career at Palm Harbor University High School in Palm Harbor, Florida. After failing to make the varsity baseball team in his first two seasons, he transferred to J. W. Mitchell High School in New Port Richey, Florida, where he played for the school's baseball team. As a junior, in 2002, he won six games. He was named to the All-Conference first team.

In 2003, his senior season, Clippard had a 1–1 record with an 0.81 ERA and 31 strikeouts in 17 1/3 innings pitched. However, he was dismissed from the school's baseball team after being charged with driving under the influence of alcohol. Clippard transferred to Dunedin High School in Dunedin, Florida, which had a nationally ranked baseball team. Clippard attempted to play for their team, but the move was blocked by the Florida High School Athletic Association, as players are not allowed to transfer during the course of a season, nor are they allowed to transfer to avoid sanctions given for disciplinary reasons. After taking classes at Dunedin for a month, Clippard transferred back to Mitchell in order to graduate from high school with his friends.

Clippard competed for the Central Florida Renegades in Connie Mack Baseball, an amateur 18-and-under competition organized by the American Amateur Baseball Congress. He earned pitcher of the week honors in the Florida State Elite Baseball League in June 2003.

Clippard also played golf at Mitchell. As a sophomore, in 2001, Clippard was named one of the ten best golfers in Pasco County. He registered the best individual score in the Sunshine Athletic Conference tournament that year. He was named to the All-Conference first team as a junior and to the All-County as a senior, and helped lead Mitchell to victory in the Sunshine Athletic Conference tournament during his senior year.

== Professional career ==
=== Draft ===
Without the benefit of a full senior season to show himself off to scouts, Clippard proactively sent scouts a schedule of when he was throwing and attended as many showcases as he could. He trained with Roy Silver, a retired professional baseball player, who worked with Clippard on his mechanics and his maturity. Clippard's father, Bob, teamed up with Tom Kotchman, father of Florida high school player Casey Kotchman, to form showcases with past teammates of Clippard.

Clippard was drafted in the ninth round of the 2003 MLB draft, with the 274th overall selection, by the New York Yankees. Though he had signed a National Letter of Intent in the fall of 2002 to attend the University of South Florida on a baseball scholarship, allowing him to play college baseball for the South Florida Bulls, he chose to turn professional due to his draft position and the opportunity to play for the Yankees.

=== New York Yankees ===
Clippard made his professional debut that year in the Rookie-level Gulf Coast League (GCL) with the GCL Yankees, pitching to a 3–3 win–loss record with a 2.89 ERA. In 43 2/3 innings, he allowed 33 hits and five walks while striking out 56. Moving up to the Battle Creek Yankees of the Class A Midwest League for the 2004 season, Clippard had a 10–10 record with a 3.44 ERA and a strikeout-to-walk ratio of 4.53:1 in 25 starts.

Clippard was 10–9 with a 3.18 ERA for the Tampa Yankees of the Class A-Advanced Florida State League (FSL) in 2005. He was named to the West team in the FSL All-Star Game. However, he did not appear in the game, as the Charleston RiverDogs of the Class A South Atlantic League needed another pitcher that day. Clippard was named FSL pitcher of the week for the week of July 10 through 17. For the season, opponents batted .219 against him and he struck out 169 batters in 147 1/3 innings, while walking 34. He led Yankees farmhands in strikeouts and finished fifth in the affiliated minor leagues, behind Francisco Liriano, Joel Zumaya, Rich Hill and Chuck James. He also led the FSL in strikeouts and was seventh in ERA. However, he did not make the FSL post-season All-Star team and Baseball America did not rank him as one of the league's top prospects.

Baseball America ranked Clippard as the Yankees' tenth best prospect heading into the 2006 season. Promoted to the Trenton Thunder of the Class AA Eastern League in 2006, Clippard again led Yankee farmhands in strikeouts (175). He allowed just a .200 batting average and had three times as many strikeouts as walks. Clippard was 12–10 with a 3.35 ERA for the Trenton Thunder. He threw the first no-hitter in franchise history on August 17, shutting down the Harrisburg Senators. He was named the Eastern League's pitcher of the week for his accomplishment. Earlier in the season, Clippard flirted with a perfect game, retiring the first 21 batters in a game against the Binghamton Mets. Clippard also won nine straight games at one point, breaking the club record of eight shared by Tomo Ohka and Carl Pavano. He teamed with Phil Hughes to form one of the best pitching duos in minor league baseball. Clippard again was fifth in the affiliated minors in strikeouts, trailing Yovani Gallardo, Francisco Cruceta, Matt Maloney and Franklin Morales. He led the Eastern League in strikeouts and was seventh in ERA. Baseball America ranked him as the tenth-best prospect in the Eastern League.

Clippard began 2007 with the Scranton/Wilkes-Barre Yankees of the Class AAA International League. He was 3–2 with a 2.72 ERA in his first eight starts, striking out 41 in 39 2/3 innings but allowing 40 hits and 17 walks. Though the Yankees experienced injuries in the starting rotation, they called on Matt DeSalvo and Chase Wright before Clippard. When Darrell Rasner broke his finger in May, Clippard was called up to New York. He became the seventh rookie to start a game for the 2007 New York Yankees, following Hughes, DeSalvo, Rasner, Wright, Kei Igawa and Jeff Karstens.

Making his MLB debut on May 20, 2007, in an interleague game against the New York Mets, Clippard recorded his first MLB win. He pitched six innings, giving up one run off the bat of David Wright and three hits. The first time major league hitter he faced was José Reyes; Clippard struck him out on three pitches. Clippard also recorded his first career hit that night, in his first plate appearance since high school. He asked for the lightest bat that the clubhouse manager could find, then doubled in his second at-bat, off Mets pitcher Scott Schoeneweis, a drive to right center in the sixth inning. Clippard was optioned back to the minor leagues in June. He struggled in his return to the minor leagues for Scranton/Wilkes-Barre, and was demoted to Trenton in July. Though he was a member of the Trenton team as they won the Eastern League championship, Clippard struggled in the playoffs. The Yankees recalled him in September. Overall, he had a 3–1 record and a 6.33 ERA with the Yankees.

=== Washington Nationals ===
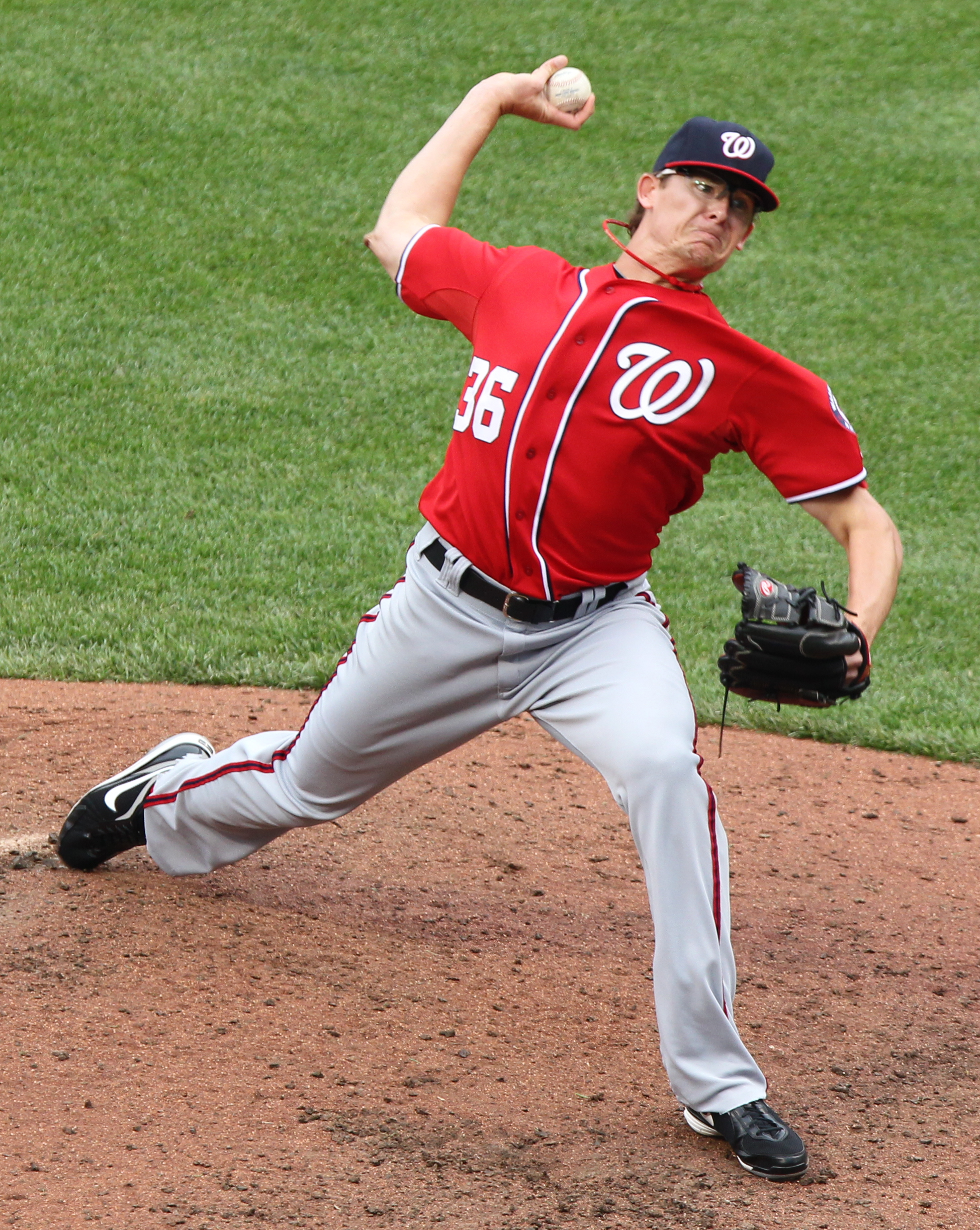
Clippard pitching for the Washington Nationals in 2011

Clippard was traded on December 4, 2007, to the Washington Nationals for relief pitcher Jonathan Albaladejo. The Nationals viewed him as a contender for a spot in the starting rotation. However, he began the season with the Columbus Clippers, Washington's Class AAA affiliate. He pitched his first game for the Nationals on June 9, 2008, after Odalis Pérez was placed on the 15-day disabled list. He was optioned to the minor leagues after this start, but was given a second start a few days later because Pérez was not yet ready to return. The Nationals then optioned Clippard to Columbus after his second start, in which Clippard pitched to a 1–1 record and 4.35 ERA. He was recalled later in June as Shawn Hill was placed on the disabled list. He spent most of the season with Columbus, going 6–13 with a 4.66 ERA. He tied Yorman Bazardo and Charlie Haeger for the most losses in the International League that season.

During spring training in 2009, the Nationals optioned Clippard to the Syracuse Chiefs, Washington's new Class AAA affiliate. Despite starting six games with the Yankees in 2007 and two for the Nationals in 2008, he was converted to a relief pitcher for the 2009 campaign. Nationals' pitching coach Steve McCatty told Clippard that his future was pitching in relief, because his pitch count tended to get too high in starts, and opposing batters hit Clippard well by the third time the lineup turned over in a game. Clippard at first resisted the transition to the bullpen, but conversations with both his father as well as his agent, Casey Close, reassured him to continue pursuing his dream. Clippard appeared in 20 games for Syracuse in 2009, posting a 4–1 record, 0.92 ERA, and 42 strikeouts in 39 innings. Clippard pitched in 14 consecutive scoreless appearances before being promoted to the Nationals on June 21, 2009, replacing Kip Wells in the Nationals' bullpen. Used sparingly in the first weeks after his promotion, he posted a 2.69 ERA through 60 1/3 innings, with 67 strikeouts.

From 2010 onward, Clippard pitched exclusively out of the bullpen, primarily in the eighth inning. That season, Clippard and Drew Storen served as setup pitchers to Matt Capps. After pitching effectively in the first half of the season, Clippard and Capps earned the nickname "Clip and Save". Clippard finished eighth in the National League in appearances, with 78. He won eleven games on the season, which led the team.

In the first half of the 2011 season, Clippard had a 1–0 record and 1.73 ERA. He struck out 63 batters and allowed only 26 hits in 51 1/3 innings pitched, and allowed only six of 32 inherited runners to score. For his achievements, Clippard was selected to appear in the All-Star Game. He earned the victory for the National League as the game's winning pitcher, despite not retiring a batter. Adrián Beltré, the only batter Clippard faced, singled, but Hunter Pence threw out José Bautista at home plate, and the NL took the lead in the next inning. Clippard finished the season with a 3–0 record, a 1.83 ERA, and 104 strikeouts in 88 1/3 innings pitched across 72 appearances. He led the National League in win probability added.

Before the 2012 season, Clippard and the Nationals agreed to a one-year contract worth $1.65 million, avoiding salary arbitration. Clippard became the de facto closer for the Nationals in the first half of the 2012 season. After injuries to Storen and Brad Lidge, Henry Rodríguez became the closer, but Rodriguez lost the job to Clippard due to his struggles. The Nationals kept Clippard as their closer even after Storen returned to the team. He received the MLB Delivery Man of the Month Award for his performance in June 2012, recording ten saves in ten opportunities, and allowing zero runs in 11 2/3 innings pitched.

Clippard earned $4 million in 2013. He had a 6–3 record with a 2.41 ERA and 73 strikeouts in 71 innings pitched. Clippard and the Nationals agreed on a $5.875 million salary for the 2014 season. He appeared in 20 of the Nationals' first 40 games and struggled with poor command of his pitches. His command improved as his workload decreased, and he was named to the appear in the 2014 All-Star Game. He ended the season with a 2.18 ERA, and led MLB with 40 holds.

=== Oakland Athletics ===
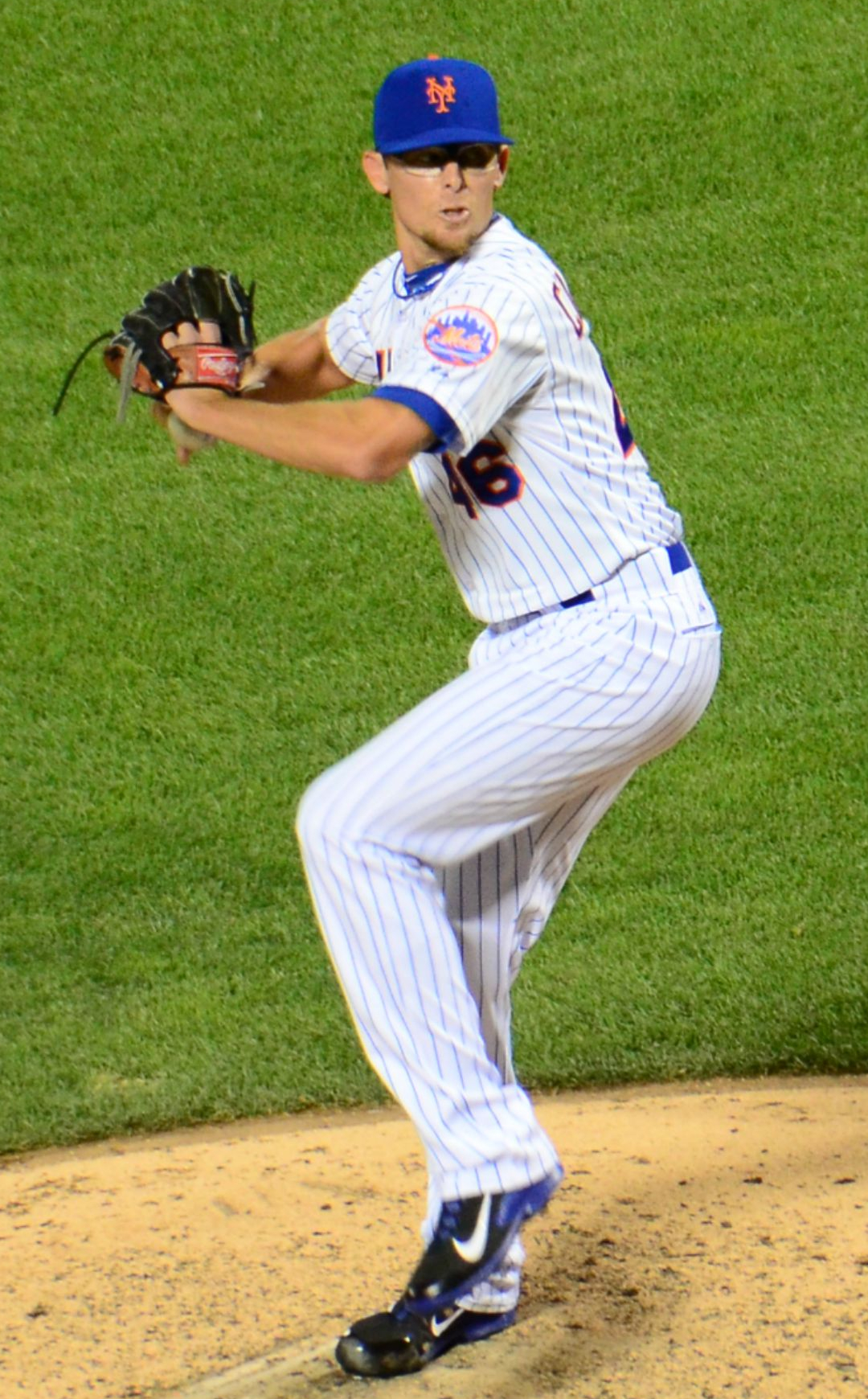
Clippard pitching for the New York Mets in 2015

The Nationals traded Clippard to the Oakland Athletics for Yunel Escobar on January 14, 2015. Clippard and the Athletics agreed on an $8.3 million salary for the 2015 season. With Athletics' closer Sean Doolittle beginning the season on the disabled list, Clippard served as the team's closer. Clippard saved 17 games for the Athletics, pitching to a 2.79 ERA in 38 2/3 innings.

=== New York Mets ===
On July 27, 2015, the Athletics traded Clippard to the New York Mets for pitching prospect Casey Meisner. Clippard returned to a setup role, with Jeurys Familia remaining the Mets' closer. In 32 1/3 innings with the Mets, Clippard pitched to a 3.06 ERA. In the 2015 MLB postseason, Clippard allowed five earned runs in 6 2/3 innings. He became a free agent following the season.

=== Arizona Diamondbacks ===
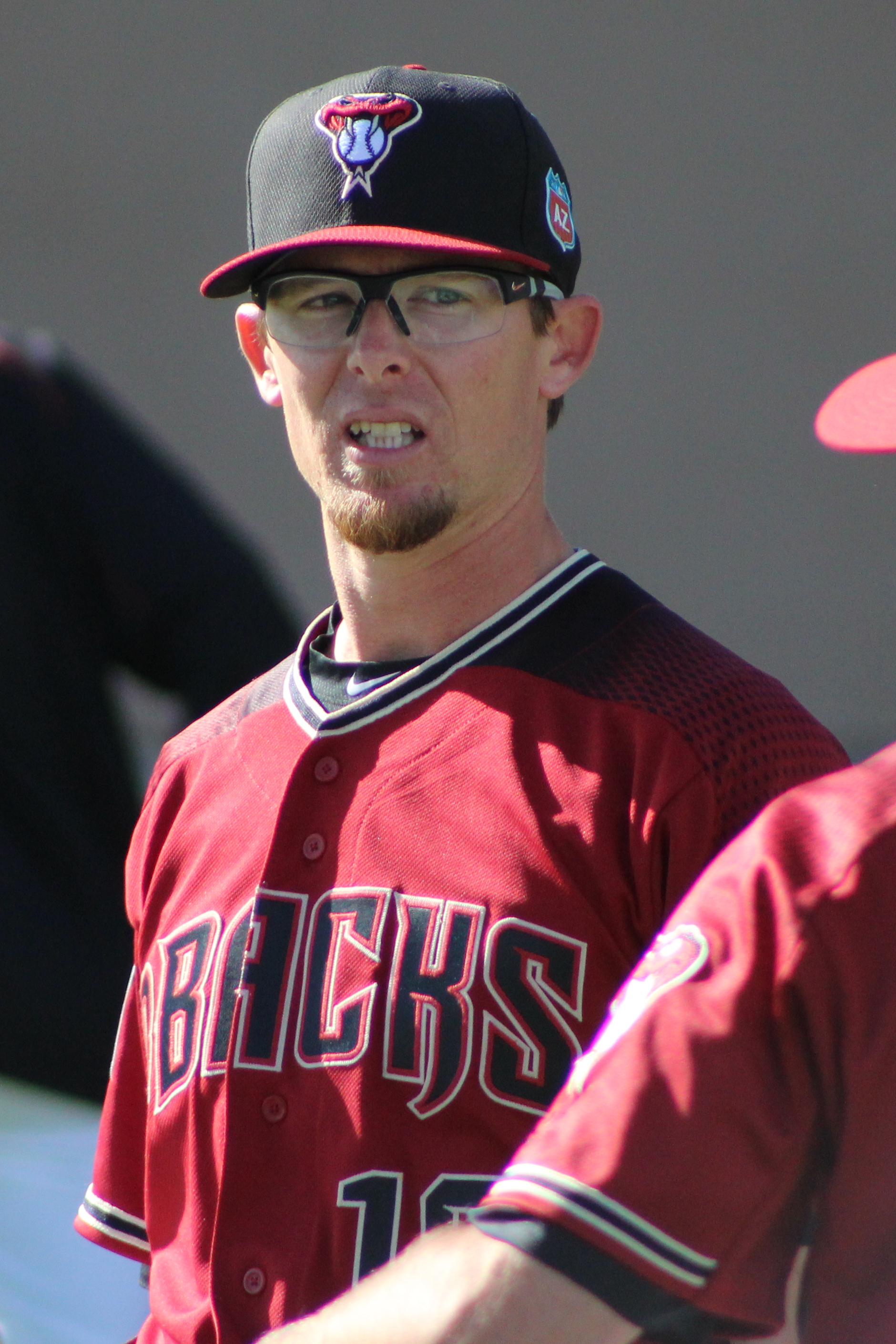
Clippard with the Diamondbacks in 2016

On February 8, 2016, After receiving fewer contract offers than he had expected, Clippard signed a two-year, $12.25 million contract with the Arizona Diamondbacks. Through July 31, 2016, Clippard pitched to a 4.30 ERA in 37 1/3 innings with one save.

=== New York Yankees (second stint) ===
On July 31, 2016, the Diamondbacks traded Clippard to the Yankees for Vicente Campos. He had a 2.49 ERA in 25 1/3 innings pitched for the Yankees in the remainder of the 2016 season. He began the 2017 season with a 1.57 ERA in 23 innings. He then struggled with his command, pitching to a 13.06 ERA over his next 10 1/3 innings, though he followed the All-Star break with two scoreless appearances. As a result, his ERA rose to 4.95.

=== Chicago White Sox ===
On July 18, 2017, the Yankees traded Clippard, Blake Rutherford, Ian Clarkin, and Tito Polo to the Chicago White Sox for David Robertson, Todd Frazier, and Tommy Kahnle. Clippard made 11 appearances with the White Sox, earning two saves, and pitching to a 1.80 ERA.

=== Houston Astros ===
On August 13, 2017, the White Sox traded Clippard to the Houston Astros in exchange for a player to be named later or cash considerations. Clippard broke the news himself by changing his biographical information on Twitter and Instagram. With the Astros to finish 2017, Clippard made 16 more appearances out of the bullpen, having a 0–2 record and a 6.43 ERA. Overall, in 2017, combined with all three teams he had played for, Clippard's total stats came to 67 appearances out of the bullpen, a 2–8 record, and a 4.77 ERA. The Astros finished the 2017 season with a 101–61 record, clinching the AL West. Clippard, however, was not part of any postseason action, although he was still on the Astros 40-man roster at the time. The Astros won their first World Series in franchise history as they bested the Los Angeles Dodgers in 7 games of the 2017 World Series. Clippard would still receive his first career World Series ring after 11 seasons of service in the Majors. He became a free agent following the season.

=== Toronto Blue Jays ===
On March 7, 2018, Clippard signed a minor league contract with the Toronto Blue Jays. His contract was purchased by the Blue Jays on March 29, 2018, and he was assigned to the Opening Day roster. After Roberto Osuna, the Blue Jays' closer, was placed on administrative leave in May, Clippard began receiving save opportunities. Clippard received his World Series ring on June 25, when the Blue Jays visited Houston. On August 2, Clippard made his first start since 2008 against the Seattle Mariners. His 680 relief appearances between starts established a new major league record. Clippard finished the 2018 season with a 3.67 ERA, seven saves, 15 holds, and 85 strikeouts over 68 2/3 innings. He became a free agent following the season.

=== Cleveland Indians ===
On February 23, 2019, Clippard signed a minor league contract with the Cleveland Indians, worth $1.75 million if he pitched at the major league level. He also received a non-roster invitation to spring training Clippard strained a pectoral muscle during spring training, and was shut down for the remainder of spring training. To avoid paying Clippard a $100,000 retention bonus, the Indians released and re-signed Clippard on March 20.

The Indians selected Clippard's contract from the Columbus Clippers on April 25, 2019. He became an integral part of Cleveland's bullpen, and was used as an opener twice. Clippard became a free agent following the 2019 season.

=== Minnesota Twins ===
On December 20, 2019, Clippard signed a one-year contract with the Minnesota Twins. With the 2020 Minnesota Twins, Clippard appeared in 26 games, compiling a 2–1 record with 2.77 ERA and 26 strikeouts in 26 innings pitched.

=== Arizona Diamondbacks (second stint) ===
On February 22, 2021, Clippard agreed to a one-year, $2.25 million contract with the Arizona Diamondbacks that included a mutual option for the 2022 season. On March 21, 2021, Clippard was shut down for six weeks with a capsule sprain in his throwing shoulder, causing him to be placed on the injured list to begin the 2021 season, the first stint on the injured list in his MLB career. On March 29, the Diamondbacks placed Clippard on the 60-day injured list. Clippard was activated off of the injured list on July 21.

=== Washington Nationals (second stint) ===
On March 31, 2022, Clippard signed a minor league contract with the Washington Nationals. On July 13, the Nationals selected Clippard's contract. He was designated for assignment on August 23. Two days later Clippard cleared waivers, refused an outright assignment, and elected for free agency according to a team announcement.

=== Retirement ===
On September 28, 2023, Clippard announced his retirement from professional baseball.

== International career ==
Clippard played for Team USA in the 2017 World Baseball Classic, helping the team win the tournament. He pitched 4 and a third innings giving up only one run and recording six strikeouts.

== Scouting report ==
Clippard was listed at 6 feet 4 inches (1.93 m) and 170 pounds (77 kg). He had an unorthodox pitching delivery, rocking forward while sticking his gloved hand high in the air, which created an unusual arm angle while pitching, making it difficult for hitters to pick up the ball in their line of vision. Clippard's father taught him to pitch this way when Clippard was eight years old by having him throw his baseball glove. McCatty nicknamed Clippard's delivery "The Funk".

Clippard primarily threw a fastball and a changeup. His hard, straight four-seam fastball averaged about 92–93 miles per hour (148–150 km/h), topping out at 96 miles per hour (154 km/h), and set up a deceptive changeup in the high 70s to low 80s. He periodically threw a cutter early in the count to right-handed hitters and a curveball in the mid 70s. Nardi Contreras, who worked with Clippard as the Yankees' minor league pitching coordinator, indicated that Clippard's greatest success came from his curveball and changeup.

Clippard compiled a strikeout rate of nearly 10 per 9 innings over his career. According to Clippard, "I don't try to strike out everyone that I face. Strikeouts just kind of happen with the way I pitch."

== Personal life ==
Clippard was raised by his parents, Bob and Debbie Clippard. He has a brother named Colin, who played Little League baseball with Tyler. He is from Tampa, Florida.

== See also ==
- List of Major League Baseball All-Star Game winners
- List of Washington Nationals team records
