= Gulf Trace Elementary School =

Location
- 3303 Gulf Trace Blvd. Holiday, Florida 34691; United States
- 28.198900°N 82.758500°W

Information
- Type: Public Elementary
- Established: 20 August 2007
- School district: Pasco County Schools
- Superintendent: Kurt Browning
- NCES School ID: 120153007406
- Principal: Dawn Scilex
- Faculty: 75
- Grades: PK–5
- Enrollment: 643 (2016-17)
- Colors: Blue and gold
- Mascot: Seastar
- Feeder to: Paul R. Smith Middle School
- Website: gtes.pasco.k12.fl.us

Gulf Trace is a public elementary school founded on August 20, 2007, in Holiday, Florida. It was Florida's first Green LEED (Leadership and Energy and Environmental Design) school and is a part of the Pasco County School System. The school mascot is the "Sea Star" and their school colors are blue and gold.

== Awards ==
The US Green Building Council certified the school as a LEED Silver building in May 2008, shortly after completion of the $13 million school, making it the first school in Florida to win this certification.

Gulf Trace has also been certified Energy Star efficient, the first building in Pasco County to receive this rating and the first school in the Tampa Bay area.

In 2011, Gulf Trace Elementary was recognized by the Florida Department of Education (FDOE) as a Five Star School, for the fourth year in a row. To qualify, the school had to have earned a grade of "C" or above in addition to 100% achievement of the required criteria in Business Partnerships, Family Involvement, Volunteers, Student Community Service, and School Advisory Councils.

Gulf Trace also was awarded the FDOE's Golden School Award for the 2010–2011 school year. To achieve this they had to have at least 80% of the staff trained in volunteerism, have a designated School Volunteer Coordinator, and the total volunteer hours for the school equal at least twice the number of students enrolled.

== Principals of Gulf Trace ==
- Hope Schooler, 2007 - 2019 (retired)
- Dawn Scilex, 2019–present

== Bibliography ==
- "About Us".
- "70 Pasco schools earn state's 'Golden School Award'". St. Petersburg, Florida: WTSP. May 17, 2011.
- Leone, Jared (December 24, 2009). "33 Tampa Bay area buildings have Energy Star ratings". St. Petersburg, Florida: Tampa Bay Times. Archived from the original on January 14, 2010.
- "Creative Contractors: Gulf Trace is Florida's first LEED school". Tampa Bay Business Journal. May 14, 2008.
- "Congratulations to Pasco's Fifty-Three Five Star Award Schools!". June 23, 2011.
