= Hudson High School (Florida) =

Coordinates: 28.366201°N 82.645421°W

Location
- 14410 Cobra Way; Hudson, Florida 34669; United States

Information
- Type: Public high school
- Motto: "Cobra Nation is Hudson Tough."
- Established: August 1973; 53 years ago
- School district: Pasco County
- Principal: Alondra Beatty-Woodall
- Teaching staff: 70.20 (FTE)
- Grades: 9-12
- Enrollment: 1,449 (2023–2024)
- Student to teacher ratio: 20.64
- Colors: Red; Gold
- Athletics: Baseball, Basketball, Cheerleading, Cross Country, Football, Golf, Soccer, Softball, Swimming, Tennis, Track, Volleyball, Weightlifting, Wrestling
- Mascot: Cobra
- Rival: Fivay High School
- Yearbook: Cobra DeCapello
- Website: http://hhs.pasco.k12.fl.us/

Hudson High School (HHS) is a public high school in Hudson, Florida, located between Hudson Academy and Hudson Primary Academy. The school opened in 1973 with grades 9 through 12; the first graduating class was in 1974. The current principal is Alondra Beatty-Woodall.

== Feeder schools ==
Hudson’s feeder schools include Hudson Primary Academy, Shady Hills Elementary, Mary Giella Elementary, Hudson Academy, and Crews Lake Middle.

== History ==
Hudson High School was first opened in 1973. On July 8, 1973, the night before classes were to begin at Hudson High School, the school’s first principal, Forest L. Mayer, had a heart attack while working at the school. He died at about 11 p.m. at the Community Hospital in New Port Richey. The next day, on July 9, 1973, Hudson High School students began attending school in the same building as Gulf High School students, but later in the day. In August 1973, the school board appointed Coy Pigman as the principal of Hudson High School. The 1974 yearbook shows Coy Pigman as principal, Arthur O'Donnell as assistant principal, and Gus Manticos as dean. The class of 1974 was the first graduating class from Hudson High School. The class of 1974 graduated on June 27, in the Gulf High School gymnasium. The first valedictorian was George J. Matis II and the first salutatorian was Norman S. Bie. The class of 1974 had nearly 150 seniors.

On September 25, 2026, a student was arrested for using pepper spray on a group of people, causing three to be hospitalized and leading to the school and neighboring Hudson Academy being temporarily placed on lockdown.

== Athletics ==
The Hudson High School cheerleading program has seen notable success:

- State Champions: 2018, 2019, 2021, 2022, 2023, 2025, 2026
- World School Champions: 2023, 2024, 2025, 2026
- National Champions: 2025
- US National Junior Coed Team: 2024, 2025, 2026
- Hudson Cheerleading represented the United States in a cultural exchange competition in Shijiazhaung, China in May of 2025.

== In popular culture ==
In October 2023, a video went viral of a female teacher named Coach Heise arguing with a student with blue hair who told her that she was "Gonna break a hip." The teacher then said, "My hips are actually in better shape than your hips," eventually saying, "Maybe it's because I exercise and you don't." Many likened the video to the term "roasting." The video of the argument became an internet meme. The video originally went viral on TikTok and later spread to other social media platforms such as Twitter, Snapchat, and iFunny. The video seemingly came from multiple Snapchat stories posted by students of the high school. The first known upload of the video was a cropped screen recording of a Snapchat story and was reposted online. Many videos of the altercation from several angles have gained millions of views and likes online.
