= Ryan Benjamin (long snapper) =

American football player (born 1977)

No. 63, 66
- Position: Long snapper

Personal information
- Born: November 17, 1977 (age 48); Greenfield, Massachusetts, U.S.
- Listed height: 6 ft 1 in (1.85 m)
- Listed weight: 242 lb (110 kg)

Career information
- High school: River Ridge (New Port Richey, Florida)
- College: South Florida
- NFL draft: 2001: undrafted

Career history
- Tampa Bay Buccaneers (2001)*; New England Patriots (2001)*; Chicago Bears (2001); New England Patriots (2002)*; Tampa Bay Buccaneers (2002–2003)
- * Offseason or practice squad member only

Awards and highlights
- Super Bowl champion (XXXVII)

Career NFL statistics
- Games played: 27
- Stats at Pro Football Reference

Ryan Arthur Benjamin (born November 17, 1977) is an American former professional football player who was a long snapper in the National Football League (NFL). He played college football for the South Florida Bulls and was signed by the Tampa Bay Buccaneers as an undrafted free agent in 2001. He won a Super Bowl ring as a member of the 2002 Buccaneers.

== Early life ==
Benjamin attended River Ridge High School in New Port Richey, Florida, where he lettered in both football and baseball. He earned all-conference and All-North Suncoast honors his senior year as a defensive tackle. He then played college football at the University of South Florida.

== Professional career ==
Benjamin signed with the Tampa Bay Buccaneers as an undrafted free agent following the 2001 NFL draft. He was also a member of the New England Patriots that offseason and played one game for the Chicago Bears in place of an injured Patrick Mannelly.

The next season, he would temporarily be back with the New England Patriots before being re-signed by the Buccaneers and winning in Super Bowl XXXVII.

== Personal life ==
Benjamin is married to high school sweetheart Theresa. While at USF, he majored in political science and was the head coach at River Ridge High School through the 2021 fall season.
