= Anclote High School =

Location
- 1540 Sweetbriar Drive; Holiday, Florida 34691; United States; 28.178087°N 82.773002°W

Information
- School type: Public high school
- Established: August 24, 2009; 17 years ago
- School district: Pasco County Schools
- Principal: Vanessa Moon
- Teaching staff: 58.60 (FTE)
- Grades: 9-12
- Gender: Coeducational
- Enrollment: 1,202 (2023–2024)
- Average class size: 30
- Student to teacher ratio: 20.51
- Colors: Royal blue, silver and white
- Slogan: Respect, Excellence, Pride
- Athletics: Baseball, basketball, cheerleading, cross country, football, golf, soccer, softball, swimming, tennis, track, volleyball, weightlifting, wrestling
- Mascot: Shark
- Rival: Tarpon Springs High School
- Yearbook: Shiver
- Website: ahs.pasco.k12.fl.us

Anclote High School (AHS) is a four-year public high school in Holiday, Florida, located next to Paul R. Smith K-8. The school opened on August 24, 2009 with grades 9 through 12; the first graduating class was in 2011. Vanessa Moon is the current principal.

== History ==
The school, designated as High School FFF in Pasco County Schools' long-range plans, was named Anclote High School by vote of the Pasco School Board in September 2008.

Anclote High School opened in August 24, 2009 to relieve crowding at J.W. Mitchell High School and Gulf High School.

== Campus ==
The buildings, designed by Holmes Hepner & Associates, are slated to be LEED certified. The campus is designed to enhance grouping into four professional learning communities: Business and Technology Community, Arts and Communication Community, Health and Human Services Community, Engineering and Science Community.

== Curriculum ==
The school's learning communities offer relevant elective coursework to the community theme, such as :

- courses in sports, law studies, and health sciences in the Health and Human Services Community,
- courses in art, journalism, multimedia production, music and dance performance in the Arts and Communication Community,
- courses in business cooperative education, information technology and networking in the Business and Technology Community, and
- courses in culinary arts and energy leadership for the Energy Academy, a career academy, in the Engineering and Sciences Community.

The Energy Academy, supported by a partnership with Progress Energy and TECO, will lead to industry certification for entry positions within the energy industries.

The Anclote High School teams, known as the Sharks, participate in Class 5A in football and Class 4A in most other sports.
