= Cypress Creek High School (Wesley Chapel, Florida) =

Location
- 8701 Old Pasco Road; Wesley Chapel, Florida 33544; United States; 28°16′55″N 82°20′20″W

Information
- Other name: CCHS
- Former name: Cypress Creek Middle High School
- Type: Public high school
- Established: 2017; 9 years ago
- School district: Pasco County Schools
- NCES School ID: 120153008517
- Principal: Karen Hetzler-Nettles
- Teaching staff: 85.80 (on an FTE basis)
- Grades: 9–12
- Enrollment: 1,910 (2023-2024)
- Capacity: 2,090
- Student to teacher ratio: 22.26
- Colors: Green and yellow
- Mascot: Coyote
- Nickname: Coyotes
- Newspaper: Howler
- Website: cchs.pasco.k12.fl.us

Cypress Creek High School (CCHS, formerly Cypress Creek Middle High School) is a public high school in Wesley Chapel, Florida, United States. It was established in 2017 to accommodate increasing enrollment and relieve overcrowding in the fast-growing area. It is part of the Pasco County Schools district.

== History ==
Cypress Creek Middle High School was established in 2017 in Wesley Chapel, Florida and was built to accommodate increasing enrollment and relieve overcrowding in the fast-growing area. The Pasco County Schools district said it "couldn’t afford to build the new middle school at the same time", so the decision was made to open a new facility as a combined middle and high school, intending to construct a separate middle school at a later date. In building the facility, the district sought to alleviate potential concerns from parents by segregating the high school and middle school locker rooms. A screen was also installed in the gymnasium to allow it to be divided for high school and middle school physical education classes. However, high school and middle school students do share bus routes, as was already occurring in other schools in the district. Students from four other high schools were rezoned to attend the new Cypress Creek, and adjustments were made to other boundaries.

As a result, middle school-age children in grades 6–8 share the facilities with high school students, pending the opening of the separate Cypress Creek Middle School in the fall of 2020 on an adjacent campus. Considerable rezoning of school boundaries affecting an estimated 1,000 pupils is expected to result. Thereafter, the school for grades 9–12 will be known as Cypress Creek High School. Once Cypress Creek Middle School opens, it will have a projected 1,554 students and the high school's enrollment is expected to be 2,080, almost its design capacity of 2,090.

== Academics ==
The school offers Advanced Placement classes, as well as course specialties, termed "Academies", in such subjects as Criminal Justice, where students are introduced to law, forensics, patrol enforcement, and self-defense techniques. Business courses include information technology, where pupils become proficient in Word, PowerPoint, and Excel. Upon successful completion and examination, students may qualify for Microsoft Office Specialist certification. STEM courses also form part of the school's elective curriculum. At the school's debut, some students in the highest high school and middle school grades (11th and 8th grades), known as "Pack Leaders", were trained on leadership and peer counseling and placed into classes in the lower grade levels, to help students in those classes.

== Athletics ==
When the school opened in 2017, its high school had grades 9-11 only, with no seniors on the football team in the first season. It now has a full varsity sports program, including football, soccer, basketball for both boys and girls, track and field, swimming, tennis, golf and baseball. A 2,273 sq ft (211 m^{2}) weight room is part of the facility, alongside the county's only rubberized track; the nickname is the Coyotes.
