= Ridgewood High School (Florida) =

Location
- 7650 Orchid Lake Road; New Port Richey, Florida 34653; United States; 28.273127°N 82.688096°W

Information
- Type: Public high school
- Motto: "Pride of Pasco"
- Established: August 22, 1978
- Closed: May 25, 2018
- School district: Pasco County Schools
- Faculty: 73.0 FTEs
- Grades: 9–12
- Enrollment: 1,064 (as of 2016-17)
- Student to teacher ratio: 15.5:1
- Colors: Orange and Blue
- Mascot: Rocky the Ram
- Accreditation: SACS
- SAT average: 473 verbal 480 math
- Website: http://rhs.pasco.k12.fl.us/

Ridgewood High School was a four-year public high school serving residential suburbs in New Port Richey, Florida on the Gulf of Mexico, part of the Pasco County Public School System in Pasco County, Florida. The school was founded on August 22, 1978, as a junior high school with the intent of becoming the third high school in western Pasco County.

As of the 2014–15 school year, the school had an enrollment of 1,133 students and 73.0 classroom teachers (on an FTE basis), for a student–teacher ratio of 15.5:1. There were 787 students (69.5% of enrollment) eligible for free lunch and 98 (8.6% of students) eligible for reduced-cost lunch.

The school closed at the end of the 2017–18 school year for conversion to Wendell Krinn Technical High School, a technical high school named after Ridgewood's first principal, Wendell Krinn. The school's closing ceremony took place on May 22, 2018, and was attended by faculty and alumni. The Tampa Bay Times wrote, "The community is losing its traditional high school, with sports teams and bands and the spirit that comes with sending generations to it."

== History ==
The Pasco County School Board approved the creation of a new junior high school north of the City of New Port Richey in response to population growth in the area during the 1970s, with the expectation that the school would ultimately become west Pasco's third high school. Superintendent Thomas Weightman had Ridgewood built to senior high specifications and purchased extra land near the school for the future expansion and conversion. The school was built for $3.2 million and opened on August 22, 1978. Wendell L. Krinn became the first principal of the school and would serve in that position for 20 years. The St. Petersburg Times proclaimed Ridgewood, "The new home of education" in Pasco County because of its state of the art facilities and unique architecture. Rowe Holmes Associates designed the main building of Ridgewood High School after the Tampa Bay Center in Tampa, Florida, with its courtyard, high ceilings, and second floor overlooking the building.

On August 5, 1981, the school board voted to convert Ridgewood to a high school. The first freshman class started in 1983, and one grade was added per year, until the 1985–1986 school year, which was the first graduating class. As part of the transition to a high school, Ridgewood underwent a $1.6 million renovation project, which included a gym added to the back of the main building, a stadium built by the football field, as well as a new weight room and tennis courts.

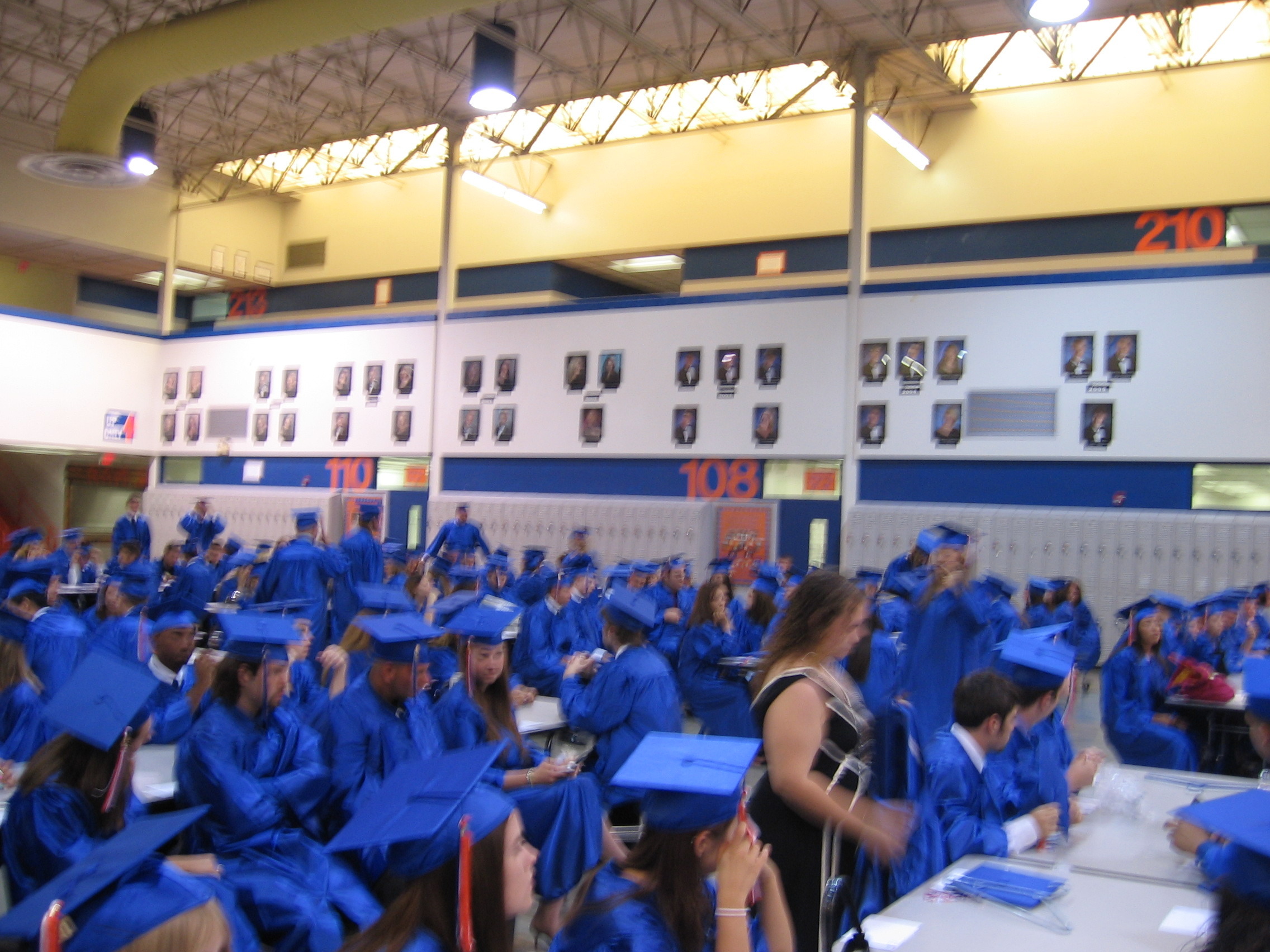
The 20th anniversary class of Ridgewood High School, Class of 2006 before Graduation

After winning the "Pride of Pasco" academic award in 1988, the title stuck as the nickname of the school. Ridgewood High School excelled during this period, leading the county in HSC test scores for four consecutive years.

In 1998, Dr. Arthur O'Donnell became the second principal in Ridgewood's history after transferring from Hudson High School. In 2003, he retired after working for 35 years in the Pasco County School System. Randall Koenigsfeld succeeded O'Donnell as principal of Ridgewood High, a position he held until July 2009, when he was transferred to Schwettman Education Center. Angie Murphy, principal of J.W. Mitchell High School was named principal of Ridgewood.

== School symbols ==
During the establishment of the school in the late 1970s, the student body at Ridgewood voted to make the official nickname and logo the Ram, "which symbolizes the endless determination of our spirit to strive for high standards in every aspect within our institution." At one time, a real ram was brought in as a mascot for sporting events who would soon be replaced by the present day Rocky the Ram.” The colors orange and blue were adopted, matching those of the University of Florida Gators.

== Academics ==
By 2004, Ridgewood High School had a graduation rate of 80%, exceeding the Pasco County average of 72% and the state of Florida average of 68%. Its dropout rate of 2.2% was lower than both the district and state averages at the time.

The school's curriculum offered 14 classes of Advanced Placement, an honors program, and many Dual-Enrollment options due to the proximity to Pasco-Hernando State College. Ridgewood was also the pilot school for a wellness program in Pasco County, to improve and teach good habits for now and in the future. 80% of Ridgewood High School students moved on to post-secondary education in 2004, the school reported.

In 2006, Ridgewood High School won the state championship of the Odyssey of the Mind competition, representing the state of Florida against the world. In recent years, however, the school's state test results had declined.

== Athletics ==
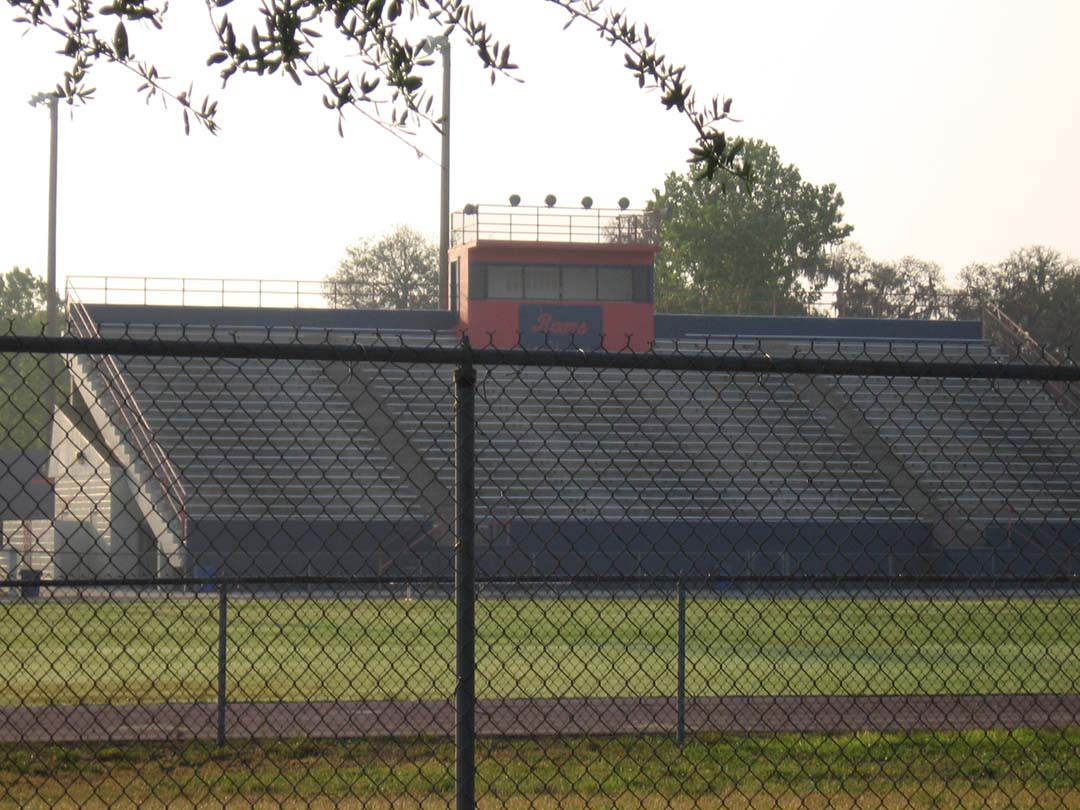
Rams Booster Stadium in 2006.

Ridgewood High School won its first Pasco County All-Sports Trophy in 1986 after winning the district title in cross country, track, baseball and soccer. "The other schools kid us a lot," said Principal Wendell Krinn to the St. Petersburg Times in 1986. "They call us the University of Ridgewood or the Taj Mahal of the county."

RHS continued this success and won two state titles in Boys' Cross Country under then Coach Glenn Cable in 1991 and 1999. Ridgewood won the Class 3A state title in Fast-Pitch Softball in 1992, led by coach Marlyn Bavetta, defeating Berkeley Preparatory School by a score of 7–6. Ridgewood achieved success in both sports during the 1990s with victories at both the district and conference level.

Competing in a group of 61 high schools in Citrus, Hernando, Hillsborough, Pasco and Pinellas counties, participating in 19 different sports, Ridgewood High School was recognized in 1992 as a winner of the fourth annual St. Petersburg Times All-Sports Championship, paced by state titles in boys cross country and softball. The football stadium is also the winter and spring break home to the Phi Delta Theta cycling team from Indiana University. The Phi Delta Theta team has won the Little 500 3 times, in 1982, 1996, and 2001.

With its athletics program drawing to a close in 2018, the final games for Ridgewood's teams were marked by gatherings of former coaches and players for the last home baseball game on April 24. The following month, the Boys' Basketball team made it to the region finals, playing its last playoff game at home before an emotional crowd of 1,500 fans and players.

== Notable alumni ==
- Mike Rabelo (Class of 1998), Major League Baseball catcher, minor-league coach
