= Wendell Krinn Technical High School =

Location
- 7650 Orchid Lake Road; New Port Richey, Florida 34653; United States
- 28.273127°N 82.688096°W

Information
- Type: Public technical high school
- Established: August 13, 2018; 7 years ago
- School district: Pasco County Schools
- Principal: Christopher Dunning
- Teaching staff: 35.00 (FTE)
- Grades: 9–12
- Enrollment: 765 (2024-2025)
- Student to teacher ratio: 21.86
- Website: School website

Wendell Krinn Technical High School is a four-year public technical high school in New Port Richey, Florida, on the Gulf of Mexico. It is part of the Pasco County Public School System in Pasco County, Florida. The school opened on August 13, 2018, using the campus of the old Ridgewood High School, which closed in May, 2018. It is named for the first principal of Ridgewood High School.

The school will operate as a magnet school, drawing students from throughout Pasco County. They may earn college credits and have career training while obtaining their high school diploma. Specialized courses will include cyber security and BioMedical.
