= River Ridge High School (Florida) =

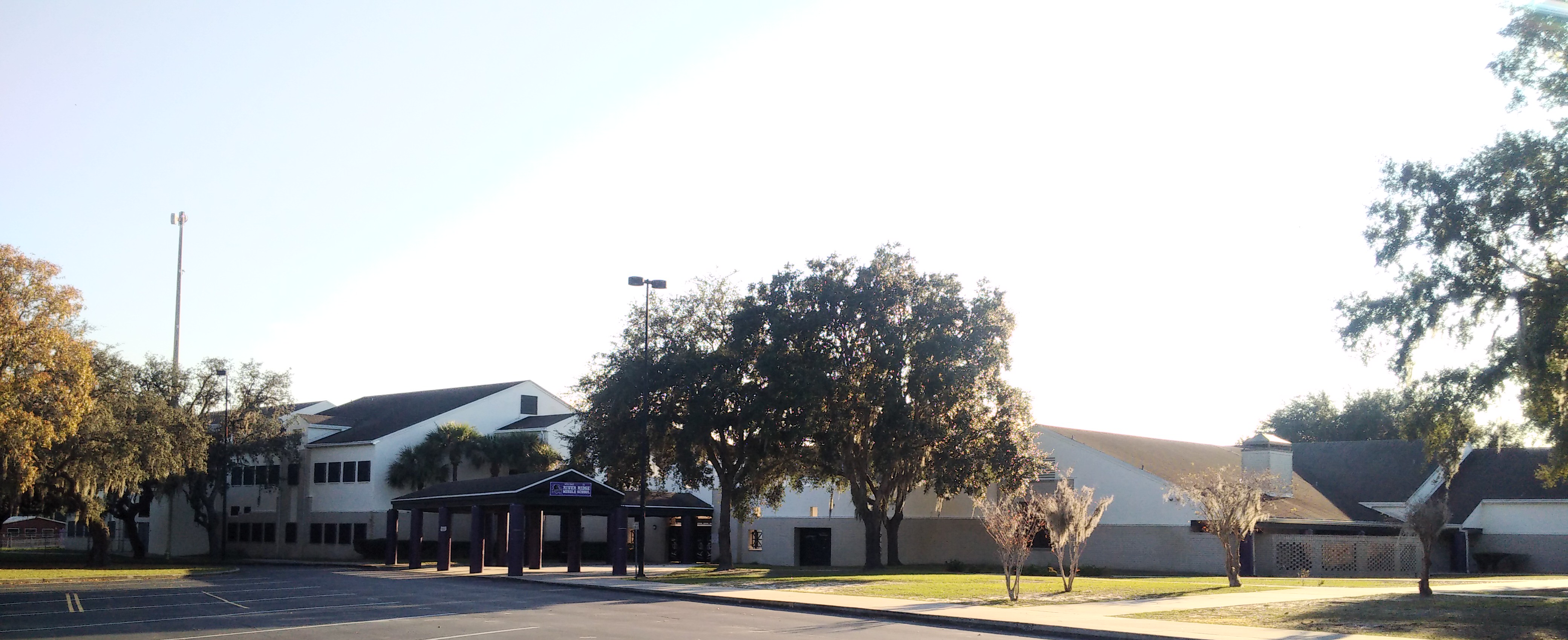

Information
- Type: Public High School
- Established: 1991; 35 years ago
- Locale: Suburban, large
- School district: Pasco County Schools
- Superintendent: John Legg
- CEEB code: 101219
- NCES School ID: 120153002882
- Principal: Kelly McPherson
- Teaching staff: 75.40 (on an FTE basis)
- Grades: 9 to 12
- Gender: coed
- Enrollment: 1,802 (2022–23)
- Student to teacher ratio: 23.90
- Colors: Purple and silver
- Mascot: Royal Knight
- Yearbook: Excalibur
- Website: rrhs.pasco.k12.fl.us

River Ridge is a public middle/high school complex founded in 1991 in New Port Richey, Florida. It was Florida's first joint middle/high school complex and is a part of the Pasco County School System. Both schools have their own classrooms, media center, and administrators. They share the cafeteria, theater, administrative offices, gymnasium, and athletic facilities. The complex is the largest school in Pasco County. The school mascot is the "Royal Knight" and their school colors are purple and silver.

== Extracurricular activities ==
River Ridge has many sports including football, hockey, soccer, basketball, tennis, wrestling, weightlifting, volleyball, cheerleading, swimming, cross country, and track. They also offer marching and concert band, drama, dancing as part of the Fine Arts & Musical Entertainment (FAME) Academy. The School also offers Business, Media, Engineering, and Teaching Academies.

Other student organizations include the German, Spanish, Art, and Kitty Hawk Honor Societies, Interact, Student Council, Chess Club, SPLASH (Students Protecting Land And Sea Habitats), KORR TV-5 News, Thespians, FBLA, Tri-M, the River Ridge Executive Council, FFEA, an AFJROTC unit, and the Academy of Engineering.

River Ridge High School also offers a robotics club as part of its Academy of Engineering. The robotics club, known as Royal Robotics, takes part in the VEX Robotics Competition, FIRST Robotics Competition (team 5842), and ComBots (Combat Robotics). Royal Robotics takes part in community outreach projects aimed to start STEM related activities in local schools, as well as inspiring young children to choose a STEM related career. The club has won many notable awards, such as the Rookie Inspiration Award at the FIRST Robotics South Florida Regional competition and first place at local ComBots competitions. The team has also taken part in notable competitions, including the VEX Robotics Florida State Championship in 2015, and the 2016 FIRST Championship. As of February 2019, they have won first place at multiple Robotics Competitions throughout the US including but not limited to Roboticon 2017 and 2019, the FRC 2019 Greater Pittsburgh Regional, FRC 2017 Lone Star North Regional, and the VEX Robotics Greater Tampa League.

== Principals of River Ridge ==
- Robert Dorn, 1991 - 1995
- Tina Tiede, 1995 - 2000
- Tammy Rabon, 2000 - 2004
- Jim Michaels, 2004 - 2009
- Maria Swanson, 2009 - 2015
- Toni Zetzsche, 2015 – 2024
- Kelly McPherson, 2025–present

== Notable alumni ==
- Ryan Benjamin, former NFL long snapper, Tampa Bay Buccaneers
- John Brandon, writer
- Jynxzi (Nicholas Stewart) (content creator)
- Anthony Kendall, NFL Cornerback, Tennessee Titans
