= Holiday, Florida =

- CDP
- Location in Pasco County and the state of Florida
- Coordinates: 28°11′11″N 82°45′04″W
- Country: United States
- State: Florida
- County: Pasco

Area
  - Total: 5.70 sq mi (14.76 km^{2})
  - Land: 5.35 sq mi (13.85 km^{2})
  - Water: 0.35 sq mi (0.90 km^{2})
- Elevation: 20 ft (6.1 m)

Population (2020)
  - Total: 24,939
  - Density: 4,662.3/sq mi (1,800.12/km^{2})
- Time zone: UTC-5 (Eastern (EST))
  - Summer (DST): UTC-4 (EDT)
- ZIP codes: 34690-34691
- Area code: 727
- FIPS code: 12-31075
- GNIS feature ID: 2402594

Holiday is a census-designated place (CDP) in Pasco County, Florida, United States. It is a suburb of the Tampa-St. Petersburg-Clearwater, Florida Metropolitan Statistical Area. The population was 24,939 as of the 2020 census.

In the early 1960s, William W. Boyd, president of First Federal Savings and Loan Association of Tarpon Springs, noted the name Holiday Drive on a map near the site of the proposed branch to be built in southwestern Pasco County and asked his board of directors to give the name to the new branch. Later Boyd began drumming up support to name the community Holiday.

== Geography ==
Holiday is located in west central Florida northwest of Tampa Bay on the Gulf of Mexico.

== Demographics ==
Historical population
Census	Pop.	Note	%±
1980	18,392		—
1990	19,360		5.3%
2000	21,904		13.1%
2010	22,403		2.3%
2020	24,939		11.3%

=== 2020 census ===
As of the 2020 census, Holiday had a population of 24,939. The median age was 44.0 years. 19.2% of residents were under the age of 18 and 20.8% of residents were 65 years of age or older. For every 100 females there were 95.9 males, and for every 100 females age 18 and over there were 94.3 males age 18 and over.

100.0% of residents lived in urban areas, while 0.0% lived in rural areas.

There were 10,825 households in Holiday, of which 24.1% had children under the age of 18 living in them. Of all households, 34.5% were married-couple households, 22.5% were households with a male householder and no spouse or partner present, and 30.8% were households with a female householder and no spouse or partner present. About 32.2% of all households were made up of individuals and 14.9% had someone living alone who was 65 years of age or older.

There were 13,179 housing units, of which 17.9% were vacant. The homeowner vacancy rate was 3.4% and the rental vacancy rate was 9.2%.

Racial composition as of the 2020 census
Race	Number	Percent
White	18,648	74.8%
Black or African American	1,739	7.0%
American Indian and Alaska Native	134	0.5%
Asian	470	1.9%
Native Hawaiian and Other Pacific Islander	7	0.0%
Some other race	1,353	5.4%
Two or more races	2,588	10.4%
Hispanic or Latino (of any race)	3,875	15.5%

=== 2010 census ===
As of the census of 2010, there were 22,403 people and 9,505 households residing in the CDP. The racial makeup of the CDP was 82.7% White, 4.1% African American, 0.5% Native American, 1.4% Asian, and Hispanic or Latino of any race were 10.0% of the population. The population density per square mile was 4,168.8.

There were 9,505 households. The average persons living in a household was 2.31. The home ownership rate was 73.8%. The median value of owner-occupied units was $97,600. There were 12,484 housing units.

In the CDP, the population was spread out, with 20.0% of children under 18 (5.8% under 5) and 21.2% who were 65 years of age or older. The female population was 51.4%. High school graduates or higher of ages 25+ was 82.4%. Bachelor's degree or higher of ages 25+ was 10.1%. There were 2,887 veterans.

The per capita income was $19,947 and the median household income was $36,888.

== Infrastructure ==
- Holiday Pacific and Southern Tower. At 1538 ft., this antenna tower is one of the tallest structures on the west coast of Florida.
- Duke Energy Power Plant (Anclote Power Plant), located at 1729 Baillies Bluff Road, Holiday, FL 34691.

== Borders and neighborhoods ==
Holiday is bordered on the south by the City of Tarpon Springs/Pinellas County Line, the Gulf of Mexico on the west (with access from the Anclote River Park, Gulf Park, and Key Vista Park in Holiday), the city of New Port Richey to the north, and Trinity to the east.

Holiday is divided into many neighborhoods, which include:

- Aloha Gardens
- Baillies Bluff
- Beacon Square
- Colonial Hills
- Crest Ridge Gardens
- Forest Hills
- Forest Hills East
- Gulf Trace
- Gulf Winds
- Holiday Lake Estates
- Holiday Lake Villas
- Holiday Lake West
- Key Vista
- La Villa Gardens
- Sand Bay
- Westwood

== Schools ==
Holiday is part of the Pasco County School System.

There are three elementary schools in Holiday:

- Gulfside Elementary School
- Sunray Elementary
- Gulf Trace Elementary School

There is one middle school:

- Paul R. Smith Middle School (named after United States Army Sergeant First Class Paul Ray Smith, who was posthumously awarded the Medal of Honor for his actions on 4 April 2003 during the invasion of Iraq).

There is one high school:

- Anclote High School (named after the Anclote River)

Private Schools:

- Web of Wisdom, serves students grades K-12. Located at 5238 Mile Stretch Dr, Holiday, FL 34690.
- World of Knowledge, a Montessori School, serves students pre-kindergarten-12. Located at 1935 Abacus Road, Holiday, Florida 34690.
