= Pasco County Schools =

School district in Florida, United States

Coordinates: 28.2625°N 82.4769°W

District School Board of Pasco County
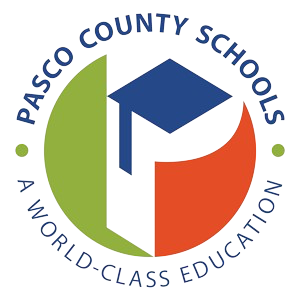

Address
- 7227 Land O' Lakes Blvd Land O' Lakes, Pasco, Florida, 34638; United States

District information
- Motto: To provide a world class education for all students
- Grades: PK–12
- Established: 1887; 139 years ago
- Superintendent: John Legg
- Deputy superintendent(s): Elizabeth “Betsy” Kuhn, Monica Ilse, Ed.D
- NCES District ID: 1201530

Students and staff
- Enrollment: 86,685 (2024–25)
- Teachers: 4,966 (2023–24)
- Staff: 13,033 total (as of 2024–25)
- Student–teacher ratio: 17.29 (2023–24)

Other information
- Website: www.pasco.k12.fl.us

Pasco County Schools, also known as District School Board of Pasco County, is a school district that serves all of Pasco County in the U.S. state of Florida. It was founded in 1887 and has 106 schools as of the 2025-2026 school year.

== History ==
=== Early history ===
The Pasco County School Board was founded in 1887, which is also the year the county was founded. Augustine H. Ravesies was appointed the first superintendent of schools. At the time, there were 37 teachers in the county.

In 1896, it was reported that Pasco had 1123 students, 48 teachers, and 42 schools. The first high school in western Pasco County was Gulf High School in 1922.

=== Segregations in schools ===
Originally schools in Pasco were segregated. The first black school in Pasco is debated, but most agree it was the Hernando Colored School, located near what is now Trilby, though the exact location is not known. The name suggests that it was created before Pasco County was, but was integrated into Pasco County Schools.

Segregation in schools ended when in 1967, the school board ended its battle with the Departments of Health, Education, and Welfare, finally ending segregation.

== Controversies ==
=== Disability services settlement ===
In March 2024, Pasco County Schools reached a settlement with the U.S. Department of Justice over allegations of discrimination against students with disabilities. The district was accused of failing to provide adequate educational plans and support, leading to suspensions, flawed threat assessments, and law enforcement referrals for disability-related behaviors. Under the agreement, the district has agreed to implement major reforms as part of the settlement.

=== Student data sharing and privacy violations ===
In 2020, the Tampa Bay Times published "Targeted," an investigative series that won the Pulitzer Prize for Local Reporting. The investigation revealed that the school district had been sharing sensitive student data with the Pasco County Sheriff's Office for its "Intelligence-Led Policing" program. The shared data included student grades, attendance records, and disciplinary history, which deputies used to identify "at-risk" youth for potential future criminal behavior.

The program drew criticism from legal experts and parents, who were unaware that their children's educational records were being used for law enforcement profiling. In response to the controversy, the district revised its data-sharing agreements in 2021 to limit the Sheriff's access to student information. The U.S. Department of Education also launched an investigation into whether the district's practices violated the Family Educational Rights and Privacy Act (FERPA).

== Schools ==
As of the 2025–2026 school year, there are 106 schools in the system. There are 54 elementary schools, 22 middle schools, 18 high schools, 1 college, 1 virtual school, and 18 charter schools.

The county has seen explosive growth in student enrollment, increasing from 46,458 students in the 1999–2000 year to 65,126 in the 2007–2008 year, an increase of 18,668 or 40.2%. The projected enrollment for the 2007–2008 was 64,674, so the actual enrollment was 452 students over the projection. The enrollment for the 2023–2024 school year was 85,855 students with a total of 4,966 teachers. It is the 48th largest school district in the United States compared to more than 14,000 schools, and the 10th largest school district in Florida out of 67 schools.

=== High schools ===
The list of Pasco County high schools:

- Anclote High School – Holiday
- Angeline Academy of Innovation 6-12 – Land O' Lakes
- Cypress Creek High School – Wesley Chapel
- East Pasco Education Academy 6-12 – Dade City
- Fivay High School – Hudson
- Gulf High School – New Port Richey
- Hudson High School – Hudson
- J. W. Mitchell High School – New Port Richey
- Kirkland Ranch Academy of Innovation – Wesley Chapel
- Land O' Lakes High School – Land O' Lakes
- Pasco High School – Dade City
- Pasco eSchool
- River Ridge High School – New Port Richey
- Sunlake High School – Land O' Lakes
- Wendell Krinn Technical High School – New Port Richey
- Wesley Chapel High School – Wesley Chapel
- West Pasco Education Academy 6-12 – Hudson
- Wiregrass Ranch High School – Wesley Chapel
- Zephyrhills High School – Zephyrhills

=== Middle schools ===
The list of Pasco County middle schools:

- Angeline Academy of Innovation 6-12 – Land O' Lakes
- Bayonet Point Middle School – New Port Richey
- Centennial Middle School – Dade City
- Charles S. Rushe Middle School – Land O' Lakes
- Chasco K–8 - Port Richey
- Crews Lake Middle School – Spring Hill
- Cypress Creek Middle School – Wesley Chapel
- East Pasco Education Academy 6-12 - Dade City
- Gulf Middle School – New Port Richey
- Hudson Academy 4–8 – Hudson
- John Long Middle School – Wesley Chapel
- Kirkland Ranch K–8 – Wesley Chapel
- Pasco eSchool
- Pasco Middle School – Dade City
- Paul R. Smith Middle School – Holiday
- Pine View Middle School – Land O' Lakes
- R. B. Stewart Middle School – Zephyrhills
- River Ridge Middle School – New Port Richey
- Seven Springs Middle School – New Port Richey
- Skybrooke K–8 – Lutz
- Starkey Ranch K–8 – Odessa
- Thomas E. Weightman Middle School – Wesley Chapel
- West Pasco Education Academy 6-12 - Hudson

=== Elementary schools ===
The list of Pasco County elementary schools:

- Achieve Center at Richey – New Port Richey
- Achieve Center at Wesley Chapel – Wesley Chapel
- Anclote Elementary School – New Port Richey
- Bexley Elementary School – Land O' Lakes
- Centennial Elementary School – Dade City
- Chasco K–8 – Port Richey
- Chester W. Taylor Elementary School – Zephyrhills
- Connerton Elementary School – Land O' Lakes
- Cotee River Elementary School – New Port Richey
- Cypress Elementary School – New Port Richey
- Deer Park Elementary School – New Port Richey
- Denham Oaks Elementary School – Lutz
- Double Branch Elementary School – Wesley Chapel
- Fox Hollow Elementary School – Port Richey
- Gulf Highlands Elementary School – Port Richey
- Gulf Trace Elementary School – Holiday
- Gulfside Elementary School – Holiday
- Hudson Academy 4–8 – Hudson
- Hudson Primary Academy K–3 – Hudson
- James M. Marlowe Elementary School – New Port Richey
- Kirkland Ranch K–8 – Wesley Chapel
- Lacoochee Elementary School – Dade City
- Lake Myrtle Elementary School – Land O' Lakes
- Longleaf Elementary School – New Port Richey
- Mary Giella Elementary School – Spring Hill
- Mittye P. Locke Early Learning Academy – New Port Richey
- Moon Lake Elementary School – New Port Richey
- New River Elementary School – Wesley Chapel
- Oakstead Elementary School – Land O' Lakes
- Odessa Elementary School – New Port Richey
- Pasco Elementary School – Dade City
- Pasco eSchool
- Pine View Elementary School – Land O' Lakes
- Quail Hollow Elementary School – Wesley Chapel
- Richey Elementary School – New Port Richey
- Rodney B. Cox Elementary School – Dade City
- San Antonio Elementary School – Dade City
- Sand Pine Elementary School – Wesley Chapel
- Sanders Memorial Elementary School – Land O' Lakes
- Schrader Elementary School – New Port Richey
- Seven Oaks Elementary School – Wesley Chapel
- Seven Springs Elementary School – New Port Richey
- Shady Hills Elementary School – Spring Hill
- Skybrooke K–8 – Lutz
- Starkey Ranch K–8 – Odessa
- Sunray Elementary School – Holiday
- Trinity Elementary School – New Port Richey
- Trinity Oaks Elementary School – New Port Richey
- Veterans Elementary School – Wesley Chapel
- Watergrass Elementary School – Wesley Chapel
- Wesley Chapel Elementary School - Wesley Chapel
- West Zephyrhills Elementary School
- Wiregrass Elementary School
- Woodland Elementary School

=== Colleges ===
- Fred. K. Marchman Technical College – New Port Richey

=== Charter schools ===
The list of Pasco County charter schools:

- Academy at the Farm (K–9) – Dade City
- Athenian Academy of Technology and The Arts (K–8) – New Port Richey
- Classical Preparatory Charter School (K–12) – Spring Hill
- Countryside Montessori Charter School (1–8) – Land O' Lakes
- Dayspring Academy Harmony Campus (K–5) – Port Richey
- Dayspring Academy Jazz Campus (K–5) Port Richey
- Dayspring Academy Ovation Campus (8–12) – Port Richey
- Dayspring Academy Symphony Campus (K–5) – Port Richey
- Dayspring Angeline (K–5) – Land O' Lakes
- Imagine School at Land O' Lakes (K–8) – Land O' Lakes
- Imagine School at Trinity (K–6) – New Port Richey
- Innovation Preparatory Academy (K–8) – Wesley Chapel
- Learning Lodge Academy (K–8) – New Port Richey
- Pepin Academies (3–12) – New Port Richey
- Pinecrest Academy Connerton (K–6) – Land O' Lakes
- Pinecrest Academy Wesley Chapel (K–11) – Wesley Chapel
- Plato Academy Trinity Charter School (K–8) New Port Richey
- Union Park Charter Academy (K–8) – Wesley Chapel

=== Magnet schools ===
- Angeline Academy of Innovation – Land O' Lakes
- Centennial Elementary School – Dade City
- James M. Marlowe Elementary School – New Port Richey
- Kirkland Ranch Academy of Innovation – Wesley Chapel
- Kirkland Ranch (K–8) – Wesley Chapel
- Sanders Memorial Elementary School – Land O' Lakes
- Wendell Krinn Technical High School – New Port Richey

=== Virtual schools ===
Pasco County is known for having virtual schools like the K–12 online school called Pasco eSchool, which was founded in 2009 as a part of Pasco County Schools. The school is a Pasco County district franchise of Florida Virtual School. Pasco eSchool teaches 1,480 full-time students yearly, and is the third largest virtual school by number of student enrollment in Florida. The virtual school is funded by Pasco County Schools.

==== Formerly ====
Pasco County Schools had a virtual learning option called MySchool online. The option was offered during 2020–2021 due to the COVID-19 pandemic, though was removed the following school year.

== School Board ==
The School Board members are elected on a non-partisan basis.

Pasco County School Member Board Information
District	Official Portrait	Member	Position
1.		Al Hernandez	Member
2.		Colleen Beaudoin	Vice-chairman
3.		Cynthia Armstrong	Chairman
4.		Jessica Wright	Member
5.		Megan Harding	Member

== Superintendents ==
Since November 2024, former Florida State senator John Legg has been the Pasco County Schools superintendent of schools. Legg stated he would allow teachers to grade student homework in the county since early 2025, which is a change from the previous school board.

Superintendents of Pasco County Schools
Number	Official Portrait	Name	Position	Executive Secretary
1.		John Legg	Superintendent	N/A
2.		Monica Ilse	Deputy Superintendent for Curriculum and Instruction	Kathy Minichino
3.		Elizabeth Kuhn	Deputy Superintendent	Kathy Huntzinger
4.		Cortney Gantt	Asst. Superintendent for Elementary Schools	Margarida Wainraich
5.		Marcy Hetzler-Nettles	Asst. Superintendent for Middle Schools	Kathy Minichino
6.		Kimberly Poe	Asst. Superintendent for Elementary Schools	Margarida Wainraich
7.		James Greene	General Counsel to the Superintendent	Kathy Huntzinger
8.		Dr. Lori Romano	Chief Operations Officer	Betsy Eanes
9.		Tammy Taylor	Chief Finance Officer	Betsy Eanes
10.		Shana Rafalksi	Assistant Superintendent for Opportunity Schools	Betsy Eanes
11.		Dr. Toni Zetzsche	Chief Communications and Community Engagement Officer	Marsha Rux
12.		Kevin Shibley	Chief of Staff	Carla Lied
13.		Jason Joens	Assistant Superintendent for High Schools	Kathy Minichino
