= Land O' Lakes, Florida =

- Census-designated place
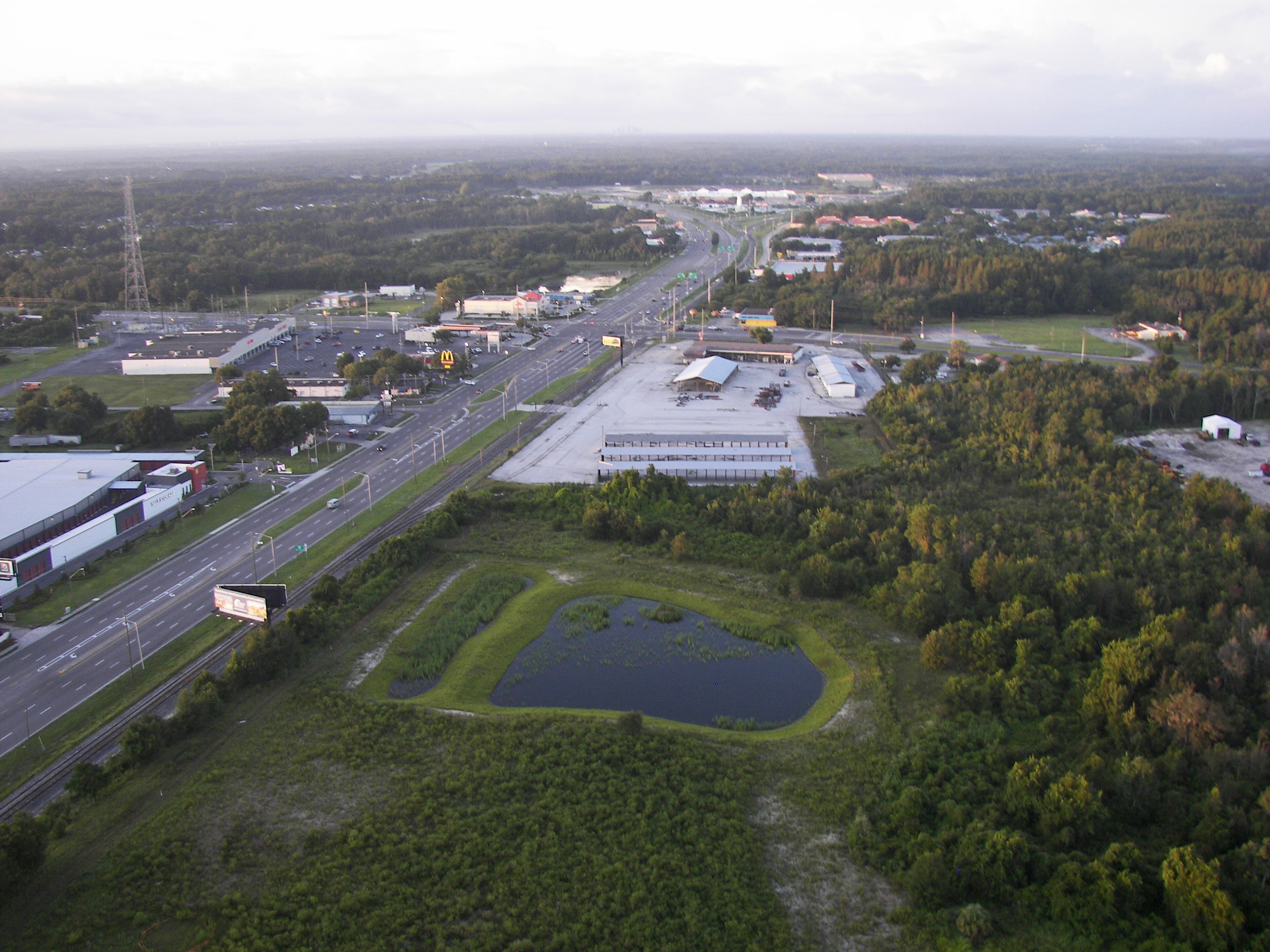
- Intersection of U.S. Route 41 and State Road 54

- Location in Pasco County and the state of Florida
- Coordinates: 28°12′14″N 82°27′26″W
- Country: United States
- State: Florida
- County: Pasco

Area
  - Total: 21.17 sq mi (54.82 km^{2})
  - Land: 18.96 sq mi (49.10 km^{2})
  - Water: 2.21 sq mi (5.72 km^{2})
- Elevation: 82 ft (25 m)

Population (2020)
  - Total: 35,929
  - Density: 1,895.3/sq mi (731.78/km^{2})
- Time zone: UTC-5 (Eastern (EST))
  - Summer (DST): UTC-4 (EDT)
- ZIP codes: 33599, 34637, 34638, 34639
- Area codes: 813, 656
- FIPS code: 12-39200
- GNIS feature ID: 2403218

Land O' Lakes is a census-designated place (CDP) in Pasco County, Florida, United States. It is part of the Tampa-St. Petersburg-Clearwater, Florida MSA. As of the 2020 US census, the CDP had a population of 35,929.

== History ==
The land that is now Land O' Lakes was taken from its Native American inhabitants in the 1830s as part of the Second Seminole War. By the 1840s, a stage coach line ran through the center of where the CDP is now located. Eventually, by the early 1900s, a railroad line ran through the CDP and a station was built.

Throughout the 20th century, Land O' Lakes expanded and absorbed surrounding communities such as Denham, Ehren, and Gowers Corner.

Dupree Gardens, one of Florida's original roadside tourist attractions, was located in what is now known as Land O' Lakes. The name Land O' Lakes was suggested and thought of in 1949. On September 1950, the community was renamed Land O' Lakes.

== Demographics ==
Historical population
Census	Pop.	Note	%±
1980	4,515		—
1990	7,892		74.8%
2000	20,971		165.7%
2010	31,996		52.6%
2020	35,929		12.3%

=== Racial and ethnic composition ===
Land O' Lakes racial composition
Race	Population 2010	Population 2020	% 2010	% 2020
White (NH)	24,058	23,837	75.19%	66.34%
Black or African American (NH)	1,469	1,834	4.59%	5.10%
Native American or Alaska Native (NH)	70	82	0.22%	0.23%
Asian (NH)	913	1,262	2.85%	3.50%
Pacific Islander or Native Hawaiian (NH)	22	14	0.07%	0.04%
Some other race (NH)	70	243	0.22%	0.68%
Two or more races/Multiracial (NH)	534	1,635	1.67%	4.55%
Hispanic or Latino (any race)	4,860	7,022	15.19%	19.54%
Total	31,996	35,929	100%	100%
Note: (Hispanics excluded from racial categories) (NH = Non-Hispanic)

=== 2020 census ===
As of the 2020 census, Land O' Lakes had a population of 35,929 and 13,598 households, of which 10,393 were family households. The median age was 42.9 years; 21.2% of residents were under the age of 18 and 17.5% were 65 years of age or older. For every 100 females there were 96.6 males, and for every 100 females age 18 and over there were 93.8 males age 18 and over. The average household size was 2.82.

99.3% of residents lived in urban areas, while 0.7% lived in rural areas.

Of the 13,598 households, 32.9% had children under the age of 18 living in them. Of all households, 58.0% were married-couple households, 13.4% were households with a male householder and no spouse or partner present, and 22.0% were households with a female householder and no spouse or partner present. About 19.8% of all households were made up of individuals and 8.6% had someone living alone who was 65 years of age or older.

There were 14,492 housing units, of which 6.2% were vacant. The homeowner vacancy rate was 1.1% and the rental vacancy rate was 7.5%.

Racial composition as of the 2020 census
Race	Number	Percent
White	25,762	71.7%
Black or African American	1,999	5.6%
American Indian and Alaska Native	131	0.4%
Asian	1,287	3.6%
Native Hawaiian and Other Pacific Islander	21	0.1%
Some other race	1,606	4.5%
Two or more races	5,123	14.3%
Hispanic or Latino (of any race)	7,022	19.5%

=== 2010 census ===
As of the 2010 United States census, there were 31,996 people, 11,820 households, and 8,515 families residing in the CDP.

== Major roads ==
- Suncoast Parkway runs north and south along the western edge of Land O' Lakes (actually closer to Odessa).
- U.S. Route 41 (Land O' Lakes Boulevard) is the main north-south road in Land O' Lakes as well as the rest of central Pasco County
- SR 52 is a main east-west road that runs through central Pasco County, from US 19 near Hudson to US 98 in Dade City.
- SR 54 is the main east-west road that runs through southern Pasco County, from US 19 near Holiday to US 301 in Zephyrhills.
- SR 597 (Dale Mabry Highway)
- County Road 583 (Ehren Cutoff) runs northeast to southwest from US 41 to SR 52 in rural Pasco County.
- Collier Parkway

== Culture ==
An honorary mayor position was established by area residents in 1968. The honorary mayor has no real political power and only has ceremonial duties.

The town is a member of Pasco County Libraries with a library branch, the Land O' Lakes Branch Library, at 2818 Collier Parkway, Land O' Lakes, Florida 34639.

== Education ==
Public district schools are operated by the Pasco County Schools.

=== High schools ===
- Angeline Academy of Innovation
- Pasco eSchool
- Land O Lakes High School
- Sunlake High School

=== Middle schools ===
- Angeline Academy of Innovation
- Pasco eSchool
- Charles S. Rushe Middle School
- Pine View Middle School

=== Charter schools ===
- Classical Preparatory School
- Countryside Montessori
- Imagine School at Land O Lakes

=== Private schools ===
- Angeline Country Day School
- Academy at the Lakes
- Center Academy Lutz
- Land O Lakes Christian School

== Notable companies ==
- Artix Entertainment
- Hungry Harry´s Famous Barbecue

== Points of interest ==
- Conner Preserve
- Cypress Creek Preserve
- Dupree Gardens (Historical marker and gate ruins)
