= J. W. Mitchell High School =

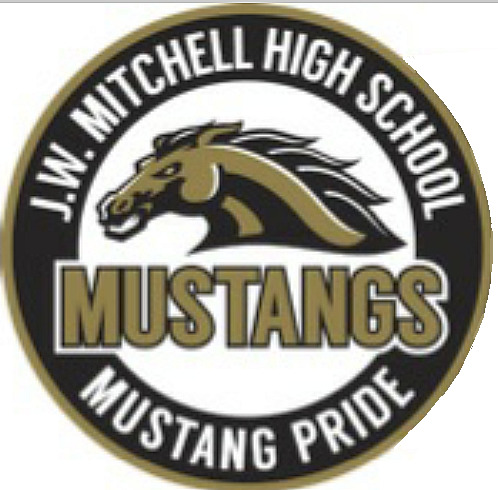

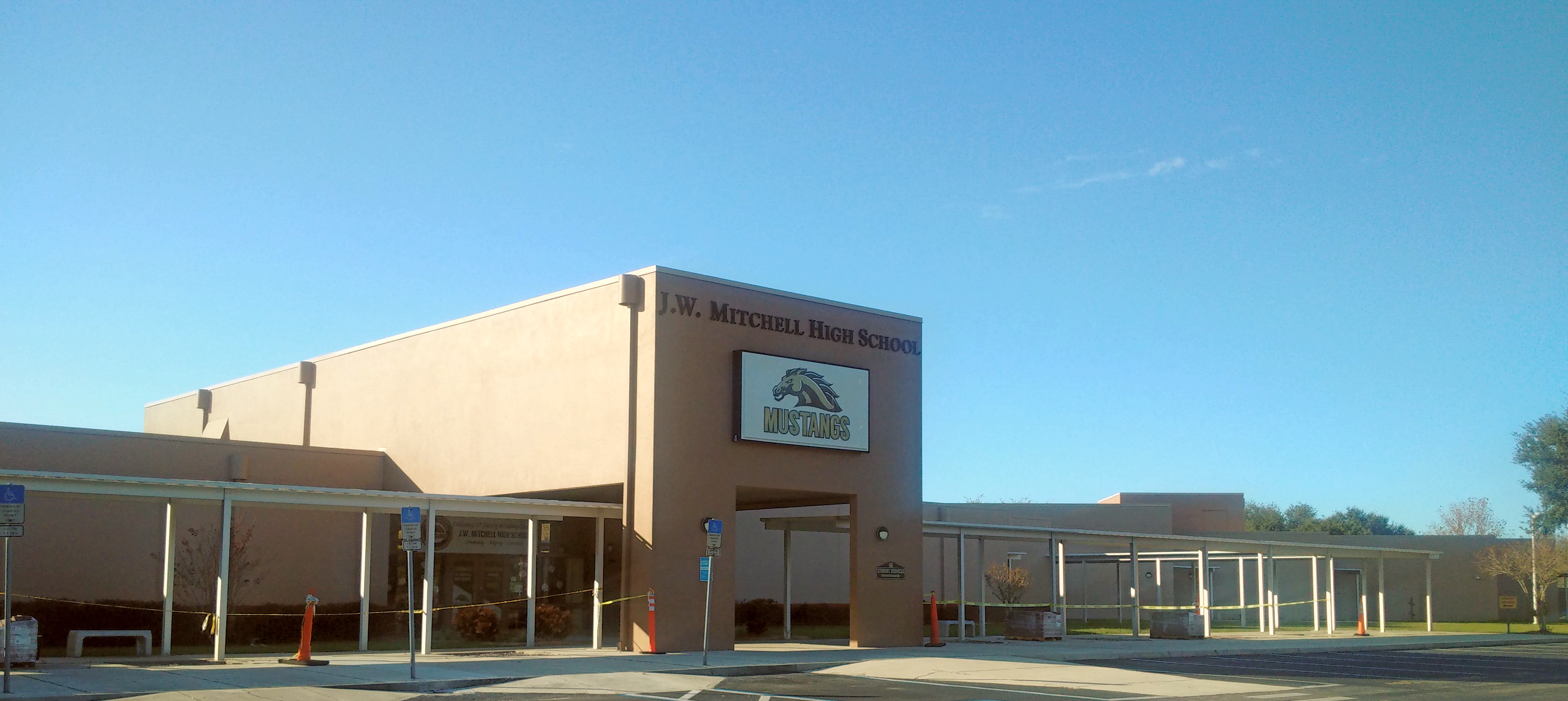

Location
- 2323 Little Road; Trinity, Florida 34655; United States; 28°11′34″N 82°40′01″W

Information
- School type: Public High School
- Established: August 14, 2000; 26 years ago
- School district: Pasco County Schools
- CEEB code: 101560
- NCES School ID: 120153004423
- Principal: Jessica Schultz
- Teaching staff: 100.80 (on an FTE basis)
- Grades: 9 to 12
- Gender: coed
- Enrollment: 2,192 (2023–2024)
- Student to teacher ratio: 21.75
- Colors: Black and gold
- Slogan: Empowered by Community, Driven by Integrity, Dedicated to Excellence
- Mascot: Mustang
- Newspaper: Hoofbeat
- Yearbook: The Stampede
- Website: School website

J. W. Mitchell High School (also called Mitchell or JWMHS), is a public high school in Trinity, Florida, located next to Seven Springs Middle School. Its current principal is Jessica Schultz. It is one of the largest schools in the Pasco County Schools district. The school opened on August 14, 2000.

== History ==
J. W. Mitchell High School opened at the start of the 2000–01 school year, designed to relieve overcrowding at River Ridge and Gulf High Schools. Its first graduating class was in 2002. The school is named for James Mitchell, a rancher, community leader and businessman. His wife Dorothy served on the school board for about 20 years.

The school gained nationwide publicity in 2019 when its science lab classes were the first in the US to use synthetic frogs for dissection, instead of preserved real frogs. The move eliminated student exposure to formaldehyde and overcomes ethical objections raised to the widespread killing and dissection of the amphibians.

== State championships ==
During the 2009-2010 season, the Mustangs secured Pasco county's first ever soccer state championship. They beat Jacksonville Stanton 1-0, February 18, 2010.

During the 2011-2012 season, Mitchell's Hockey team won their first state championship. They beat Spanish River in Coral Springs, FL 10-2.

During the 2024-2025 season, Mitchell boys soccer win their second state championship. They beat Mandarin, February 22, 2025.

== National championships ==
The Mustangs were Florida's first to win the USA Hockey High School Nationals for the 2015-16 school year. They most recently competed in the USA Hockey High School Nationals for a second time, during the 2021-22 school year, but did not end up victorious.

== Band program ==
The J.W. Mitchell High School Band Program has over 200 members and features a diverse range of musical groups including the marching band, three concert bands, two jazz ensembles, two competitive color guards, and a percussion ensemble.

== Former principals ==
- Ms. Tina Tiede (2000–2004)
- Mr. Ric Mellin (2004-2009)
- Mr. Jim Michaels (2009–2015)
- Ms. Jessica Schultz (2016–Present)

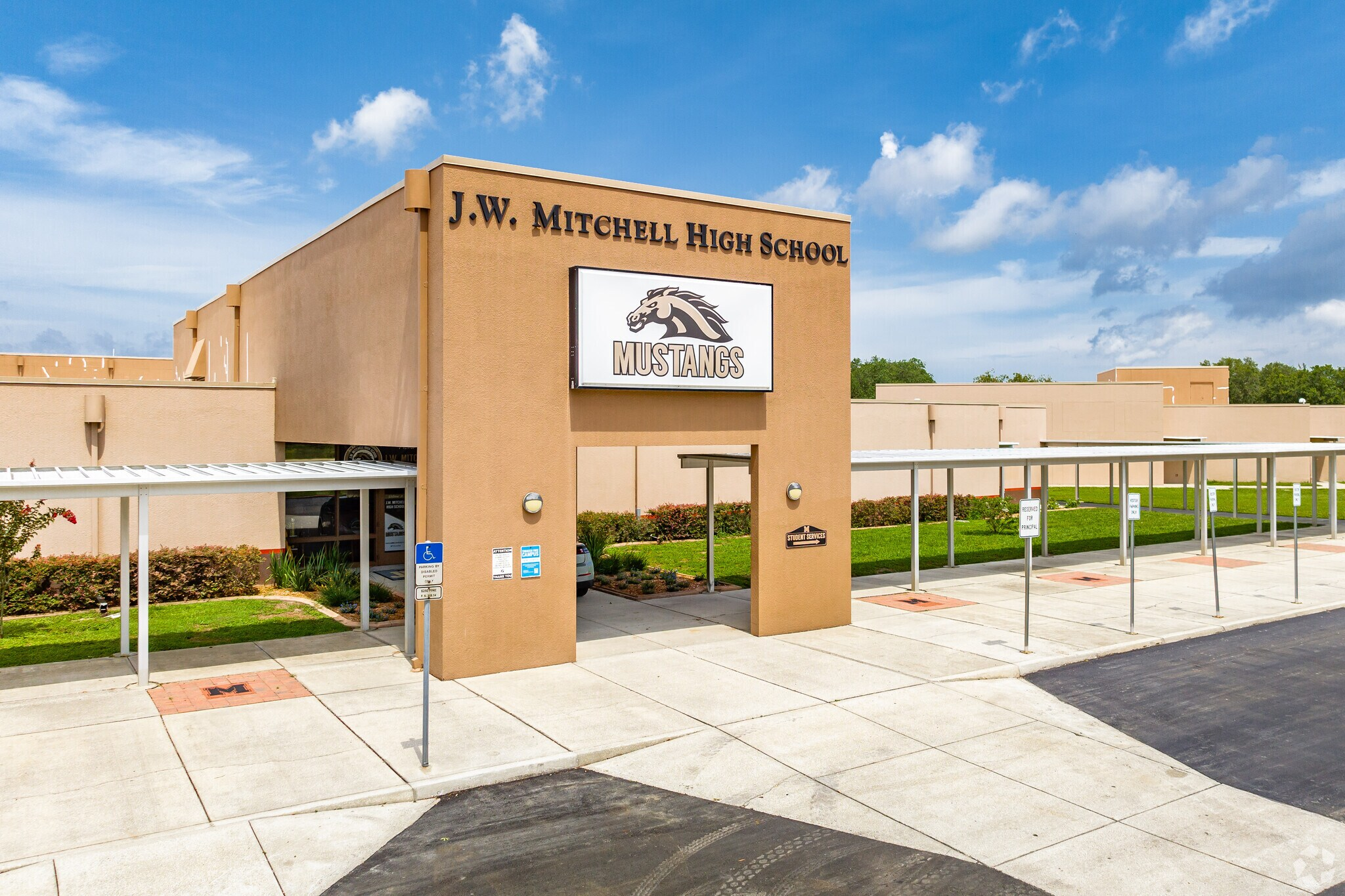
School entrance to the main offices at JWMHS.

== Notable alumni ==
- Tyler Clippard – professional baseball player
- Ryan Garton – professional baseball player
- Aidan Miller – professional baseball player
- Patrick Schuster – professional baseball player
- Nathan Smith – professional AHL player for the Charlotte Checkers and Olympian for Team USA

D* Dylan Leighton - linebacker for the Florida Gators [https://floridagators.com/sports/football/roster/dylan-leighton/18282]
