= List of high schools in Florida =

This is a list of high schools in the U.S. state of Florida.

== Alachua County ==
- First Christian Academy, High Springs
- Hawthorne Middle/High School, Hawthorne
- Newberry High School, Newberry
- Santa Fe High School, Alachua

=== Gainesville ===
==== Public/magnet/charter ====
- Alachua eSchool
- Buchholz High School
- Eastside High School
- Gainesville High School
- Loften High School
- P. K. Yonge Developmental Research School
- SIATech Gainesville

==== Private/religious ====
- Christian Life Academy
- Cornerstone Academy
- Oak Hall High School
- Passage Christian Academy
- The Rock School
- St. Francis High School
- Windsor Christian Academy

== Baker County ==
- Baker County High School, Glen St. Mary

== Bay County ==
- J.R. Arnold High School, Panama City Beach

=== Lynn Haven ===
- A. Crawford Mosley High School
- New Horizons Learning Center

=== Panama City ===
==== Public ====
- A. D. Harris High School
- Bay High School
- Deane Bozeman School
- Rutherford High School

==== Charter/magnet ====
- AMIKids Panama City Marine Institute
- Chautauqua Learn & Serve Charter School
- Haney Technical High School
- Newpoint Bay High School
- North Bay Haven Career Academy
- Palm Bay Prep Academy
- Rising Leaders Academy
- Rosenwald High School

==== Private/religious ====
- Covenant Christian School
- Panama City Advanced School

== Bradford County ==
=== Starke ===
- Bradford High School
- Bradford-Union Technical Center
- Hope Christian Academy
- Northside Christian Academy

== Brevard County ==
- Cocoa Beach High School, Cocoa Beach
- Rockledge High School, Rockledge
- Satellite High School, Satellite Beach
- Viera High School, Viera

=== Cocoa ===
- Cocoa High School
- Space Coast Christian Academy
- Space Coast Junior/Senior High School

=== Melbourne ===
- Eau Gallie High School
- Florida Preparatory Academy
- Holy Trinity Episcopal Academy
- Melbourne Central Catholic High School
- Melbourne High School
- Palm Bay Magnet High School
- Parkhurst Academy
- RFM Christian Academy
- Sancta Familia Academy
- Wade Christian Academy
- West Shore Junior – Senior High School

=== Merritt Island ===
- Brevard Private Academy
- Edgewood Junior/Senior High School
- Merritt Island Christian School
- Merritt Island High School

=== Palm Bay ===
- Bayside High School
- Covenant Christian School
- Heritage High School
- Odyssey Charter School
- Riverdale Country School

=== Titusville ===
- Astronaut High School
- Titusville High School

=== West Melbourne ===
- Brevard Academy
- West Melbourne Christian Academy

== Broward County ==
- Hallandale High School, Hallandale Beach
- Lauderhill 6-12 STEM-MED, Lauderhill
- Marjory Stoneman Douglas High School, Parkland
- Millennium 6-12 Collegiate Academy, Tamarac
- Piper High School, Sunrise

=== Coconut Creek ===
- Atlantic Technical Center
- Coconut Creek High School
- Monarch High School
- North Broward Preparatory School

=== Cooper City ===
- Cooper City Christian Academy
- Cooper City High School
- Westlake Preparatory School & Academy

=== Coral Springs ===
- Coral Glades High School
- Coral Springs Charter School
- Coral Springs Christian Academy
- Coral Springs High School
- J. P. Taravella High School

=== Davie ===
- American Preparatory Academy
- College Academy at Broward Community College
- Conservatory Prep Senior High School
- McFatter Technical Center
- Nova High School
- Sterling Academy
- University School of Nova Southeastern University
- Western High School

=== Deerfield ===
- Deerfield Beach High School
- Highlands Christian Academy

=== Fort Lauderdale ===
- Academic Solutions Academy
- Archbishop Edward A. McCarthy High School
- Calvary Christian Academy
- Cardinal Gibbons High School
- Dillard High School
- Fort Lauderdale High School
- Fort Lauderdale Preparatory School
- Holy Temple Christian Academy
- Pine Crest School
- St. Thomas Aquinas High School
- Stranahan High School
- Westminster Academy

=== Hollywood ===
- Avant Garde Academy Broward
- Ben Gamla Charter School
- Calvary Christian Academy
- Chaminade-Madonna College Preparatory School
- Hollywood Hills High School
- International School of Broward
- McArthur High School
- Sheridan Hills Christian School
- South Broward High School

=== Lauderdale Lakes ===
- Boyd H. Anderson High School
- Rhema Word Christian Academy

=== Margate ===
- Ascend Academy Charter High School
- Broward Math & Science Schools
- Phyl's Academy

=== Miramar ===
- Everglades High School
- Miramar High School

=== Oakland Park ===
- Lighthouse Christian Academy
- Northeast High School

=== Pembroke Pines ===
- Charles W. Flanagan High School
- Pembroke Pines Charter High School
- West Broward High School

=== Plantation ===
- American Heritage School
- David Posnack Hebrew Day School
- Plantation High School
- South Plantation High School

=== Pompano Beach ===
- Blanche Ely High School
- Pompano Beach High School

=== Weston ===
- Cypress Bay High School
- Sagemont Upper School

== Calhoun County ==
- Altha Public School (K-12), Altha
- Blountstown High School, Blountstown

== Charlotte County ==
- Charlotte High School, Punta Gorda
- Lemon Bay High School, Englewood
- Port Charlotte High School, Port Charlotte

== Citrus County ==
=== Crystal River ===
- Academy of Environmental Science
- Crystal River High School

=== Inverness ===
- Citrus High School
- Withlacoochee Technical Institute

=== Lecanto ===
- Cypress Creek Academy
- Lecanto High School

== Clay County ==
- Clay High School, Green Cove Springs
- Fleming Island High School, Orange Park
- Keystone Heights Junior-Senior High School, Keystone Heights
- Middleburg High School, Middleburg

=== Orange Park ===
- Oakleaf High School
- Orange Park High School
- Ridgeview High School
- St. Johns Country Day School

== Collier County ==
- Everglades City School, Everglades City
- Immokalee High School, Immokalee
- Rhodora J. Donahue Academy of Ave Maria, Ave Maria

=== Naples ===
- Barron G. Collier High School
- The Community School of Naples
- First Baptist Academy High School
- Golden Gate High School
- Gulf Coast High School
- Lely High School
- Naples High School
- Palmetto Ridge High School
- St. John Neumann High School
- Seacrest Country Day School
- Lorenzo Walker Technical High School

== Columbia County ==
- Fort White High School, Fort White

=== Lake City ===
- Columbia High School
- Lake City Christian Academy
- Pathways Academy

== DeSoto County ==
=== Arcadia ===
- DeSoto High School
- Heritage Baptist Academy
- Life Christian Academy
- Peace River Valley Church Academy

== Dixie County ==
- Dixie County High School, Cross City

== Duval County ==
=== Jacksonville ===
==== Public ====
- A. Philip Randolph Academies of Technology
- Andrew Jackson High School
- Atlantic Coast High School
- Baldwin Middle-Senior High, Baldwin
- Douglas Anderson School of the Arts
- Duncan U. Fletcher High School, Neptune Beach
- Edward H. White High School
- Englewood High School
- First Coast High School
- Frank H. Peterson Academies of Technology
- Jean Ribault High School
- Mandarin High School
- Riverside High School
- Sandalwood High School
- Samuel W. Wolfson High School
- Terry Parker High School
- Westside High School
- William M. Raines High School

==== Magnet ====
- Darnell-Cookman School of the Medical Arts
- Samuel W. Wolfson High School
- Paxon School for Advanced Studies
- Stanton College Preparatory School

==== Alternative ====
- Grand Park Center
- Marine Science Education Center, Atlantic Beach

==== Charter ====
- Duval Charter High School at Baymeadows
- Pathways Academy
- River City Science Academy
- School for Integrated Academics and Technology
- SOS Academy Charter
- Wayman Academy of the Arts

==== Private ====
- Bishop Kenny High School
- Bishop Snyder High School
- Bolles School
- Christian Heritage Academy
- Christ's Church Academy
- Episcopal High School
- First Coast Christian School
- Jacksonville Country Day School
- Parson's Christian Academy
- Potter's House Christian Academy
- Providence School
- Seacoast Christian Academy
- Trinity Christian Academy
- The Covenant School of Jacksonville
- University Christian School
- West Meadows Baptist Academy
- Victory Christian Academy

== Escambia County ==
- Northview High School, Century

=== Gonzalez ===
- Escambia Charter School
- J. M. Tate High School

=== Pensacola ===
- Booker T. Washington High School
- East Hill Christian School
- Escambia High School
- Pensacola Catholic High School
- Pensacola Christian Academy
- Pensacola High School
- Pensacola School Of Liberal Arts
- Pine Forest High School
- Ruby J. Gainer Charter School, Ruby Gainer was a teacher who sued in Alabama to end racial discrimination
- West Florida High School of Advanced Technology

== Flagler County ==
=== Palm Coast ===
- First Baptist Christian Academy
- Flagler Palm Coast High School
- Matanzas High School

== Franklin County ==
- Franklin County School, Eastpoint

== Gadsden County ==
- Robert F. Munroe Day School

=== Havana ===
- Gadsden County High School, Havana
- Tallavana Christian School

== Gilchrist County ==
- Bell High School, Bell
- Trenton High School, Trenton

== Glades County ==
- Moore Haven Junior/Senior High School, Moore Haven

== Gulf County ==
- Port St. Joe High School, Port St. Joe
- Wewahitchka High School, Wewahitchka

== Hamilton County ==
=== Jasper ===
- Corinth Christian Academy
- Hamilton County High School

== Hardee County ==
- Hardee Senior High School, Wauchula

== Hendry County ==
=== Clewiston ===
- Ahfachkee Day School
- Clewiston High School
- Clewiston Christian School
- Harvest Academy Christian School

=== LaBelle ===
- International Christian Academy
- LaBelle High School

== Hernando County ==
- Weeki Wachee High School, Weeki Wachee

=== Brooksville ===
- Central High School
- Hernando Christian Academy
- Hernando High School
- Nature Coast Technical High School

=== Spring Hill ===
- Frank W. Springstead High School
- Spring Hill Christian Academy
- West Hernando Christian School

== Highlands County ==
- Lake Placid High School, Lake Placid

=== Avon Park ===
- Avon Park High School
- Walker Memorial Academy

=== Sebring ===
- Heartland Christian School
- Sebring High School

== Hillsborough County ==
- Carrollwood Day School, Carrollwood
- Earl J. Lennard High School, Ruskin
- East Bay High School, Gibsonton
- Florida College Academy, Temple Terrace
- Steinbrenner High School, Lutz

=== Brandon ===
- Brandon High School
- Central Baptist School
- Faith Baptist School

=== Lithia ===
- Newsome High School
- St. Stephen Catholic School

=== Plant City ===
- Durant High School
- Plant City High School

=== Riverview ===
- Bell Creek Academy
- Pivot Charter School
- Providence Christian School
- Riverview High School
- Spoto High School
- Sumner High School
- Tropical Acres Christian Academy

=== Seffner ===
- Armwood High School
- Hillsborough Baptist School
- Legacy Christian Academy
- Seffner Christian Academy

=== Tampa ===
==== Public ====
- Alonso High School
- Blake High School
- Chamberlain High School
- Freedom High School
- Gaither High School
- Hillsborough High School
- Jefferson High School
- King High School
- Leto High School
- Middleton High School
- Plant High School
- Robinson High School
- Sickles High School
- Tampa Bay Technical High School
- Wharton High School

==== Charter ====
- Brooks-DeBartolo Collegiate High School
- Seminole Heights Charter School
- West University Charter School

==== Private ====
- Academy of the Holy Names (all-girls)
- Bayshore Christian School
- Berkeley Preparatory School
- Falkenburg Academy
- Jesuit High School of Tampa (all-male)
- Pepin Academy
- Tampa Baptist Academy
- Tampa Catholic High School
- Tampa Preparatory School

=== Valrico ===
- Bloomingdale High School
- Foundation Christian Academy
- Grace Christian School

== Holmes County ==
- Ponce de Leon High School, Ponce de Leon
- Poplar Springs High School, Graceville

=== Bonifay ===
- Bethlehem High School
- Holmes County High School

== Indian River County ==
- Sebastian River High School, Sebastian

=== Vero Beach ===
- Indian River Charter High School
- Saint Edwards School
- Vero Beach High School

== Jackson County ==
- Cottondale High School, Cottondale
- Graceville High School, Graceville
- Grand Ridge High School, Grand Ridge
- Malone High School, Malone
- Sneads High School, Sneads

=== Marianna ===
- Hope School
- Jackson Academy of Applied Technology
- Marianna High School

== Jefferson County ==
=== Monticello ===
- Aucilla Christian Academy
- Jefferson County Middle / High School

== Lafayette County ==
=== Mayo ===
- Lafayette High School
- Lighthouse Christian School

== Lake County ==
- Lake Minneola High School, Minneola
- Montverde Academy, Montverde
- South Lake High School, Groveland
- Tavares High School, Tavares
- The Villages Charter High School, The Villages

=== Clermont ===
- Real Life Christian Academy
- East Ridge High School

=== Eustis ===
- Eustis High School
- Faith Lutheran School

=== Leesburg ===
- First Academy High School
- Leesburg High School

=== Mount Dora ===
- Hampden DuBose Academy
- Mount Dora High School
- Mount Dora Christian Academy

=== Umatilla ===
- Alee Academy Charter School
- Umatilla High School

== Lee County ==
- Bonita Springs High School, Bonita Springs
- Dunbar High School
- Estero High School, Estero
- North Fort Myers High School, North Fort Myers

=== Cape Coral ===
==== Public ====
- Cape Coral Christian School
- Cape Coral High School
- Ida S. Baker High School
- Island Coast High School
- Lee County High Technology Center North
- Mariner High School
- Oasis Charter High School

=== Fort Myers ===
==== Public ====
- Cypress Lake High School
- Fort Myers Senior High School
- Gateway High School
- Lee County High Technical Center Central
- Riverdale High School
- South Fort Myers High School

==== Charter ====
- Florida SouthWestern Collegiate High School
- Gateway Charter High School
- Pivot Charter High School

==== Private ====
- Bishop Verot High School
- Canterbury School
- Evangelical Christian School
- Southwest Florida Marine Institute

=== Lehigh Acres ===
- East Lee County High School
- Lehigh Senior High School

== Leon County ==
=== Tallahassee ===
==== Public ====
- Amos P. Godby High School
- Florida Agricultural and Mechanical High School
- Florida State University Schools
- James S. Rickards High School
- Lawton Chiles High School
- Leon High School
- Lincoln High School
- SAIL High School

==== Private ====
- Christ Classical Academy School
- Community Christian School
- Ecclesia Christian Academy
- John Paul II Catholic High School
- Lighthouse Christian Academy
- Maranatha Christian School
- North Florida Christian High School
- Woodland Hall Academy
- Maclay School

== Levy County ==
- Bronson High School, Bronson
- Cedar Key School, Cedar Key
- Williston High School, Williston

=== Chiefland ===
- Chiefland High School
- New Hope Charter School

== Liberty County ==
- Liberty County High School, Bristol

== Madison County ==
- Madison County High School, Madison

== Manatee County ==
=== Bradenton ===
==== Public ====
- Bayshore High School
- Braden River High School
- Lakewood Ranch High School
- Manatee High School
- PAL Opportunity Charter School
- Richard Milburn Academy
- Southeast High School

==== Private ====
- Bradenton Christian School
- Community Christian School
- IMG Academy
- St. Stephen's Episcopal School

=== Palmetto ===
- Manatee School for the Arts
- Palmetto High School

== Marion County ==
=== Public ===
- Dunnellon High School, Dunnellon
- North Marion High School, Citra

=== Belleview ===
- Belleview High School
- CFCC Academy

=== Ocala ===
- Forest High School
- Lake Weir High School
- Marion Technical Institute
- Ocala Christian Academy
- St. John Lutheran School
- Trinity Catholic High School
- Vanguard High School
- West Port High School

== Martin County ==
- Jensen Beach High School, Jensen Beach

=== Hobe Sound ===
- Hobe Sound Christian Academy
- The Pine School

=== Stuart ===
- Clark Advanced Learning Center
- Community Christian Academy
- Martin County High School
- South Fork High School

== Miami-Dade County ==
- Doctors Charter School of Miami Shores, Miami Shores
- Miami Palmetto High School, Pinecrest
- Miami Southridge Senior High School, Cutler Bay
- Miami Springs High School, Miami Springs
- South Miami High School, South Miami

=== Coral Gables ===
- Coral Gables Senior High School
- International Studies Preparatory Academy

=== Doral ===
- Doral Academy High School
- Doral Performing Arts & Entertainment Academy
- J.C. Bermudez Doral Senior High School
- Ronald W. Reagan/Doral Senior High School

=== Hialeah ===
- Champagnat Catholic School
- Edison Private School
- Hialeah Gardens High School
- Hialeah High School
- Hialeah-Miami Lakes High School
- Westland Hialeah High School

=== Homestead ===
- Colonial Christian School of Homestead
- Homestead High School
- Keys Gate Charter High School
- Princeton Christian School
- South Dade High School

=== Miami ===
==== Public ====
- American High School
- Booker T. Washington High School
- Dr. Michael M. Krop High School
- Felix Varela High School
- G. Holmes Braddock High School
- John A. Ferguson High School
- Miami Central High School
- Miami Coral Park High School
- Miami Edison Senior High School
- Miami High School
- Miami Jackson High School
- Miami Killian High School
- Miami Northwestern High School
- Miami Sunset High School
- Southwest Miami High School
- Young Men's Preparatory Academy (all-boys)

==== Private ====
- Archbishop Coleman F. Carroll High School
- Archbishop Curley-Notre Dame High School
- Belen Jesuit Preparatory School (all-boys)
- Carrollton School of the Sacred Heart (all-girls)
- Christopher Columbus High School (all-boys)
- Florida Christian School
- Greater Miami Adventist Academy
- Gulliver Preparatory School
- Immaculata-Lasalle High School
- La Progresiva Presbyterian School
- Miami Christian School
- Miami Country Day School
- Monsignor Edward Pace High School
- Our Lady of Lourdes Academy (all-girls)
- Ransom Everglades School
- Riviera Schools
- St. Brendan High School
- Westminster Christian School
- Westwood Christian Day Schools

==== Magnet ====
- Coral Reef High School
- Design and Architecture High School
- José Marti Math and Science Technology (MAST) 6-12 Academy
- MAST Academy
- Miami Arts Studio
- New World School of the Arts
- Robert Morgan Educational Center
- School for Advanced Studies
- School for Applied Technologies
- TERRA Environmental Research Institute
- William H. Turner Technical Arts High School

==== Charter ====
- Academy of Arts & Minds
- Archimedean Upper Conservatory
- Corporate Academy North
- Corporate Academy South
- International Studies Charter High School
- Life Skills Center Miami-Dade County
- Mater Academy Charter High School
- Mater Academy East High School
- Mater Performing Arts & Entertainment Academy
- Miami Arts Charter School
- School for Integrated Academics & Technologies
- Somerset Academy Charter High School
- Transitional Learning Academy

=== Miami Beach ===
- Miami Beach High School
- Rabbi Alexander S. Gross Hebrew Academy
- Yeshiva Toras Chaim Jewish School

=== Miami Gardens ===
- Miami Carol City High School
- Miami Norland High School

=== Miami Lakes ===
- Barbara Goleman High School
- Dade Christian School
- Miami Lakes Educational Center

=== North Miami ===
- Alonzo and Tracy Mourning Senior High Biscayne Bay Campus
- North Miami Senior High School
- Northwest Christian Academy

=== North Miami Beach ===
- AIU High School
- Allison Academy School
- North Miami Beach High School
- Samuel Scheck Hillel Community Day School

=== Palmetto Bay ===
- Palmer Trinity School
- Palmetto Bay Academy

== Monroe County ==
- Coral Shores High School, Isla Morada
- Key West High School, Key West
- Marathon High School, Marathon

== Nassau County ==
- Fernandina Beach High School, Fernandina Beach
- Hilliard Middle-Senior High School, Hilliard
- West Nassau High School, Callahan
- Yulee High School, Yulee

== Okaloosa County ==
- Baker K-12 School, Baker
- Crestview High School, Crestview
- Laurel Hill K-12 School, Laurel Hill

=== Fort Walton Beach ===
- Calvary Christian Academy
- Choctawhatchee Academy
- Choctawhatchee Senior High School
- Fort Walton Beach High School
- Okaloosa Technical College

=== Niceville ===
- Niceville High School
- Okaloosa-Walton Collegiate High School
- Rocky Bayou Christian School

== Okeechobee County ==
=== Okeechobee ===
- New Endeavor High School
- Okeechobee Alternative High School
- Okeechobee High School
- Tantie Juvenile Residential Facility

== Orange County ==
- Robert Hungerford Preparatory High School, Eatonville
- Ocoee High School, Ocoee
- Orangewood Christian School, Maitland
- Real Life Christian Academy, Clermont
- Windermere High School, Windermere
- Windermere Preparatory School, Lake Butler

=== Apopka ===
- Apopka High School
- Bear Lake Christian School
- Forest Lake Academy
- Wekiva High School

=== Orlando ===
==== Public ====
- Colonial High School
- Cypress Creek High School
- Dr. Phillips High School
- East River High School
- Edgewater High School
- Freedom High School
- Innovation High School
- Jones High School
- Lake Nona High School
- Lake Buena Vista High School
- Maynard Evans High School
- Oak Ridge High School
- Olympia High School
- Timber Creek High School
- University High School
- William R. Boone High School

==== Private ====
- Agape Christian Academy
- American School of Leadership
- Bishop Moore High School
- Central Florida Christian Academy
- Faith Christian Academy
- The First Academy
- Lake Highland Preparatory School
- Orlando Lutheran Academy
- Pine Castle Christian Academy
- Treasure of Knowledge Christian Academy

=== Winter Garden ===
- Horizon High School
- West Orange High School

=== Winter Park ===
- Lighthouse Baptist Academy
- Trinity Preparatory School
- Winter Park High School

== Osceola County ==
- Celebration High School, Celebration
- Harmony High School, Harmony
- St. Cloud High School, St. Cloud

=== Kissimmee ===
- Gateway High School
- Heritage Christian School
- Liberty High School
- New Dimensions High School
- Osceola County School For The Arts
- Osceola High School
- Poinciana High School
- Professional and Technical High School
- Tohopekaliga High School
- Neocity Academy

== Palm Beach County ==
- The Benjamin School, North Palm Beach
- Coastal Middle & High School, Lake Park
- Dr. Joaquín García High School, Lake Worth Beach
- Glades Central High School, Belle Glade
- John I. Leonard High School, Greenacres
- Royal Palm Beach High School, Royal Palm Beach
- Santaluces Community High School, Lantana
- Seminole Ridge Community High School, Loxahatchee

=== Boca Raton ===
==== Public ====
- Boca Raton Community High School
- Grandview Preparatory School
- Gulfstream Goodwill Career Academy
- Olympic Heights Community High School
- Spanish River Community High School
- West Boca Raton Community High School

==== Private ====
- Boca Raton Christian School
- Harid Conservatory
- Pope John Paul II High School
- St. Andrew's School
- Weinbaum Yeshiva High School

=== Boynton Beach ===
- Boynton Beach Community High School
- Lake Worth Christian School
- South Technical Academy
- Survivors Charter School

=== Delray Beach ===
- American Heritage School
- Atlantic Community High School

=== Jupiter ===
- Jupiter Christian School
- Jupiter Community High School

=== Lake Worth ===
- Lake Worth Community High School
- Park Vista Community High School

=== Pahokee ===
- Everglades Preparatory Academy
- Pahokee High School

=== Palm Beach Gardens ===
- Palm Beach Gardens Community High School
- William T. Dwyer High School

=== Riviera Beach ===
- Inlet Grove Community High School
- Suncoast Community High School

=== West Palm Beach ===
- Cardinal Newman High School
- Dreyfoos School of the Arts
- Forest Hill Community High School
- G-STAR School of the Arts for Motion Pictures and Television
- The King's Academy
- Oxbridge Academy
- Palm Beach Lakes Community High School

=== Wellington ===
- Forest Trail Academy Online High School
- Goliath Academy High School
- Palm Beach Central High School
- Wellington Community High School

== Pasco County ==
- Anclote High School, Holiday
- Classical Preparatory Charter School, Spring Hill
- Dayspring Academy (Ovation Campus), Port Richey
- Zephyrhills High School, Zephyrhills

=== Dade City ===
- East Pasco Adventist Academy
- East Pasco Education Academy
- Pasco High School

=== Hudson ===
- Fivay High School
- Hudson High School
- West Pasco Education Academy

=== Land O' Lakes ===
- Angeline Academy of Innovation
- Land O' Lakes High School
- Sunlake High School

=== New Port Richey ===
- Gulf High School
- J. W. Mitchell High School
- Pepin Academies
- Richard Milburn Academy
- River Ridge High School
- Wendell Krinn Technical High School

=== Wesley Chapel ===
- Cypress Creek High School
- Kirkland Ranch Academy of Innovation
- Pinecrest Academy
- Wesley Chapel High School
- Wiregrass Ranch High School

== Pinellas County ==
- Boca Ciega High School, Gulfport

=== Clearwater ===
- Bayside High School
- Calvary Christian High School
- Clearwater Central Catholic High School
- Clearwater High School
- Countryside High School
- Newpoint Pinellas

=== Dunedin ===
- Anchor Academy
- Dunedin Academy
- Dunedin High School
- Schiller Academy

=== Largo ===
- Indian Rocks Christian School
- Largo High School
- Pinellas Park High School
- Veritas Academy

=== Palm Harbor ===
- Palm Harbor Community School
- Palm Harbor University High School

=== St. Petersburg ===
==== Public ====
- Gibbs High School
- Hollins High School
- Lakewood High School
- Northeast High School
- Pinellas County Center for the Arts
- St. Petersburg High School

==== Private ====
- Canterbury School of Florida
- Keswick Christian School
- Northside Christian School
- St. Petersburg Catholic High School
- St. Petersburg Christian School
- St. Petersburg Collegiate High School
- Shorecrest Preparatory School

=== Seminole ===
- Lift Academy
- Osceola High School
- Seminole High School
- Seminole Vocational Education Center

=== Tarpon Springs ===
- East Lake High School
- Tarpon Springs High School

== Polk County ==
- Auburndale High School, Auburndale
- Fort Meade High School, Fort Meade
- Frostproof Middle-Senior High School, Frostproof
- Lake Region High School, Eagle Lake
- Mulberry High School, Mulberry

=== Bartow ===
- Bartow High School
- Gause Academy of Leadership and Applied Technology
- Summerlin Academy

=== Davenport ===
- Navigator Academy of Leadership High School
- Ridge Community High School

=== Haines City ===
- Daniel Jenkins Academy of Technology
- Haines City High School

=== Lake Wales ===
- Lake Wales High School
- McLaughlin Academy
- The Vanguard School

=== Lakeland ===
- Collegiate High School
- George W. Jenkins High School
- Harrison School for the Arts
- Kathleen High School
- Lake Gibson High School
- Lakeland Christian School
- Lakeland High School
- McKeel Academy of Technology
- Santa Fe Catholic High School
- Tenoroc High School

=== Winter Haven ===
- All Saints' Academy
- Chain of Lakes Collegiate High School
- Ridge Technical Center
- Winter Haven High School

== Putnam County ==
- Crescent City High School, Crescent City
- Interlachen High School, Interlachen
- Palatka High School, Palatka

== St. Johns County ==
- Tocoi Creek High School, World Golf Village

=== Ponte Vedra ===
- Allen D. Nease Senior High School
- Ponte Vedra High School

=== St. Augustine ===
- Beacon of Hope Christian School
- First Coast Skills Academy
- First Coast Technical High School
- Florida School for the Deaf and the Blind
- Pedro Menendez High School
- St. Augustine High School
- St. Gerard Campus School
- St. Joseph Academy

=== St. Johns ===
- Bartram Trail High School
- Beachside High School
- Creekside High School

== St. Lucie County ==
=== Fort Pierce ===
- Faith Baptist School
- Fort Pierce Central High School
- Fort Pierce Westwood Academy
- John Carroll Catholic High School
- Lincoln Park Academy

=== Port St. Lucie ===
- Morningside Academy
- Port St. Lucie High School
- St. Lucie West Centennial High School
- Treasure Coast High School
- Victory Forge Military Academy

== Santa Rosa County ==
- Gulf Breeze High School, Gulf Breeze
- Jay High School, Jay
- Navarre High School, Navarre
- Pace High School, Pace

=== Milton ===
- Central High School
- Locklin Technical Center
- Milton High School

== Sarasota County ==
- North Port High School, North Port
- Pine View School, Osprey
- Venice High School, Venice

=== Sarasota ===
==== Public/Charter ====
- Booker High School
- Riverview High School
- Sarasota High School
- Sarasota Military Academy
- Suncoast Polytechnical High School

==== Private ====
- Bishop Nevins Academy
- Cardinal Mooney High School
- The GAP School
- Julie Rohr Academy
- Lutheran Ascension School
- NewGate School
- Out-of-Door Academy
- Sarasota Christian School

== Seminole County ==
- Lake Howell High School (Winter Park address)
- Lyman High School, Longwood
- The Trinity School, Fern Park
- Winter Springs High School, Winter Springs

=== Altamonte Springs ===
- Altamonte Christian School
- Champion Preparatory Academy
- Lake Brantley High School
- St. Mary Magdalen Catholic School

=== Casselberry ===
- The Geneva School
- The Regent Academy

=== Lake Mary ===
- Lake Mary High School
- Lake Mary Preparatory School

=== Oviedo ===
- Oviedo High School
- The Master's Academy
- Paul J. Hagerty High School

=== Sanford ===
- Crooms Academy of Information Technology
- Liberty Christian School
- New Life Christian Academy
- RiverWalk Christian Academy
- Seminole High School

== Sumter County ==
- South Sumter High School, Bushnell
- The Villages Charter High School, The Villages
- Wildwood Middle High School, Wildwood

== Suwannee County ==
- Branford High School, Branford

=== Live Oak ===
- School Without Walls
- Suwannee-Hamilton Area Vocational-Technical Center
- Suwannee High School

== Taylor County ==
=== Perry ===
- Taylor County Area Vocational-Technical & General School
- Taylor County High School

== Union County ==
- Union County High School, Lake Butler

== Volusia County ==
- Calvary Christian Academy, Ormond Beach
- DeLand High School, DeLand
- New Smyrna Beach High School, New Smyrna Beach
- University High School, Orange City
- T. Dewitt Taylor Middle-High School, Pierson
- Warner Christian Academy, South Daytona

=== Daytona Beach ===
- Father Lopez Catholic High School
- Mainland High School
- Seabreeze High School

=== Deltona ===
- Deltona High School
- Pine Ridge High School
- Trinity Christian Academy

=== Port Orange ===
- Atlantic High School
- Spruce Creek High School

== Wakulla County ==
- Wakulla High School, Crawfordville

== Walton County ==
- Freeport High School, Freeport
- South Walton High School, Santa Rosa Beach
- Walton Senior High School, DeFuniak Springs

== Washington County ==
- Chipley High School, Chipley
- Vernon High School, Vernon

== See also ==
- List of school districts in Florida
- Online High Schools in Florida
