= List of schools in Hillsborough County, Florida =

This is a list of schools in Hillsborough County, Florida.

== Public high schools ==
Note: high schools are grades 9-12 unless otherwise noted.

- Alonso High School (Raven) (IB)
- Armwood High School (Hawk)
- Blake High School (Yellow Jacket)
- Bloomingdale High School (Bull)
- Bowers/Whitley Career Center (Viking)
- Brandon High School (Eagle)
- Chamberlain High School (Storm) formerly (Chief)
- D. W. Waters Career Center (11–12) (Cheetah)
- Durant High School (Cougar)
- East Bay High School (Indian)
- Freedom High School (Patriot)
- Gaither High School (Cowboy)
- Hillsborough High School (Terrier) (IB)
- Jefferson High School (Dragon)
- King High School (Lion) (IB)
- Lennard High School (Longhorn)
- Leto High School (Falcon)
- Middleton High School (Tiger)
- Morgan High School (opening 2025)
- Newsome High School (Wolf)
- Plant High School (Panther)
- Plant City High School (Raider)
- Riverview High School (Shark)
- Robinson High School (Knight) (IB)
- Sickles High School (Gryphon)
- Simmons Career Center (11-12)
- South County Career Center (11-12) (Bobcat)
- Spoto High School (Spartan)
- Steinbrenner High School (Warrior)
- Strawberry Crest High School (Charger) (IB)
- Sumner High School (Stingray)
- Tampa Bay Technical High School (Titan)
- Wharton High School (Wildcat)

== Public middle schools ==
Note: Magnet schools are indicated with *

- Barrington Middle School (Bolt)
- Benito Middle School (Jaguar)
- Buchanan Middle School (Buccaneer)
- Burnett Middle School (Wolf)
- Burns Middle School (Bruin)
- Coleman Middle School (Cobra)
- Davidsen Middle School (Dragon)
- Dowdell Middle School (Dolphin)*
- Eisenhower Middle School (General)
- Farnell Middle School (Falcon)
- Ferrell Girls Preparatory Academy (Tiger Cub)*
- Franklin Boys Preparatory Academy (Patriot)*
- Giunta Middle School (Giant)
- Greco Middle School (Cub)*(IB)
- Hill Middle School (Bear)
- Jennings Middle School (Jaguar)
- Liberty Middle School (Eagle)
- Madison Middle School (Mustang)
- Mann Middle School (Raider)
- Marshall Middle School (Dragon)*
- Martinez Middle School (Mustang)
- Memorial Middle School (Bulldog)
- Mulrennan Middle School (Mustang)
- Orange Grove Middle School (Lion)*
- Pierce Middle School (Archer)
- Progress Village Middle School (Bobcat)*
- Randall Middle School (Hawk)
- Rodgers Middle School (Stingray)*
- Shields Middle School (Sailfish)
- Sligh Middle School (Cougar)*
- Smith Middle School (Shark)
- Stewart Middle School (Yellow Jacket)*
- Tomlin Middle School (Tiger)
- Turkey Creek Middle School (Turkey)
- Walker Middle School (Wolf)* (IB)
- Webb Middle School (Spider)
- Williams Middle School (Cougar)* (IB)
- Wilson Middle School (Bulldog)
- Young Middle School (Buffalo)*

== Public elementary schools ==
General Clarence Tinker K-8 School

Note: Magnet schools are indicated with *

- Alafia Elementary School (Alligator)
- Alexander Elementary School (Tiger)
- Anderson Elementary School (Eagle)
- Apollo Beach K-8 School (Dolphin)
- B.T. Washington Elementary School (Yellow Jacket)
- Bailey Elementary School (Bull)
- Ballast Point Elementary School (Bulldog)
- Bay Crest Elementary School (Seagull)
- Bellamy Elementary School (Bobcat)
- Bevis Elementary School (Bronco)
- Bing Elementary School (Bulldog)
- Boyette Springs Elementary School (Bobcat)
- Brooker Elementary School (Bolt) formerly (Brave)
- Broward Elementary School (Tiger)
- Bryant Plant City Elementary School(Bulldogs)
- Bryan Elementary School (Bulldog)
- Bryant Elementary School (Bronco)
- Buckhorn Elementary School (Bear)
- Burney Elementary School (Bronco)
- Cannella Elementary School (Comet)
- Carrollwood K-8 School (Owl)
- Chiaramonte Elementary School (Lion)
- Chiles Elementary School (Falcon)
- Cimino Elementary School (Cougar)
- Citrus Park Elementary School (Eagle)
- Clair Mel Elementary School (Cougar)
- Clark Elementary School (Cougar)
- Claywell Elementary School (Cougar)
- Collins PK-8 School (Panther)
- Colson Elementary School (Cougar)
- Cork Elementary School (Cougar)
- Corr Elementary School (Cub)
- Crestwood Elementary School (Lion)
- Cypress Creek Elementary School (Manatee)
- Davis Elementary School (Dragon)
- Deer Park Elementary School (Cub)
- DeSoto Elementary School (Dragon)
- Dickenson Elementary School (Dolphin)
- Doby Elementary School (Navigator)
- Dorothy C. York Innovation Academy

(Admirals)

- Dover Elementary School (Dragon)
- Dr. Carter G. Woodson PK-8 School

(Wolves)

- Dunbar Elementary School (Doctor)*
- Edison Elementary School (Eagle)
- Egypt Lake Elementary School (Eagle)
- Essrig Elementary School (Panther)
- Fishhawk Creek Elementary School (Falcon)
- Folsom Elementary School (Falcon)
- Forest Hills Elementary School (Panther) formerly (Brave)
- Foster Elementary School (Eagle)
- Frost Elementary School (Cougar)
- Gibsonton Elementary School (Dog)
- Gorrie Elementary School (Jaguar)
- Grady Elementary School (Tiger)
- Graham Elementary School (Roadrunner)
- Hammond Elementary School (Wolf Cub)
- Heritage Elementary School (Bobcat)
- Hunters Green Elementary School (Panther)
- Ippolito Elementary School (Otter)
- Jackson Elementary School (Superstar)
- James Elementary School (Jaguar)
- Kenneth E. Adum K-8 Magnet School

(Aviators)

- Kenly Elementary School (Cougar)
- Kingswood Elementary School (Panther)
- Knights Elementary School (Knight)
- Lake Magdalene Elementary School (Manatee)
- Lamb Elementary School (Lightning)
- Lanier Elementary School (Dolphin)
- Lewis Elementary School (Panther)
- Limona Elementary School (Lion)
- Lincoln Elementary School (Lion)* (IB)
- Lithia Springs Elementary School (Lynx)
- Lockhart Elementary Magnet School (Cougar)*
- Lomax Elementary School (Panther)*
- Lopez Elementary School (Leopard)
- Lowry Elementary School (Leopard)
- Lutz K-8 School (Leopard)
- Mabry Elementary School (Dolphin)
- MacFarlane Park Elementary School (Explorer)* (IB)
- Mango Elementary School (Dolphin)
- McDonald Elementary School (Mustang)
- McKitrick Elementary School (Bobcat)
- Mendenhall Elementary School (Tiger)
- Miles Elementary School (Mustang)
- Mintz Elementary School (Mariner)
- Mitchell Elementary School (Bobcat)
- Morgan Woods Elementary School (Tiger)
- Mort Elementary School (Manatee)
- Muller Elementary School (Alligator)*
- Nelson Elementary School (Eagle)
- Northwest Elementary School (Nighthawk)
- Oak Grove Elementary School (Jaguar)
- Oak Park Elementary School (Lion)
- Palm River Elementary School (Panther)
- Patricia J. Sullivan Partnership School (Aviators)
- Pinecrest Elementary School (Pilot)
- Pizzo K-8 School (Bull)
- Potter Elementary School (Eagle)
- Pride Elementary School (Lion)
- Rampello K-8 Downtown Partnership Magnet School (Pirate)
- Reddick Elementary School (Stingray)
- Riverhills Elementary School (Wildcat)* (IB)
- Riverview Elementary School (Alligator)
- Robinson Elementary School (Roadrunner)
- Robles Elementary School (Eagle)
- Roland Park K-8 School (Dragon)*
- Roosevelt Elementary School (Rough Rider)
- Ruskin Elementary School (Rocket) formerly (Brave)
- Schmidt Elementary School (Sailor)
- Schwarzkopf Elementary School (Bear)
- Seffner Elementary School (Mustang)
- Seminole Elementary School (Eagle)
- Sessums Elementary School (Stallion)
- Shaw Elementary School (Bulldog)
- Sheehy Elementary School (Lion)
- Shore Elementary School*
- Springhead Elementary School (Pioneer)
- Stowers Elementary School (Cowboy)
- Sulphur Springs K-8 School (Tiger)
- Summerfield Crossings Elementary School (Cougar)
- Summerfield Elementary School (Shark) formerly (Indian)
- Symmes Elementary School (Shark)
- Tampa Bay Boulevard Elementary School (Panther)
- Tampa Heights Elementary School (Navigator)*
- Tampa Palms Elementary School (Eagle)
- Temple Terrace Elementary School (Tiger)
- Thompson Elementary School (Trailblazer)
- Thonotosassa Elementary School (Thunderbolt) formerly (Chief)
- Clarence Tinker K-8 School (Tiger) - MacDill Air Force Base
- Town and Country Elementary School (Tiger)
- Trapnell Elementary School (Trapper)
- Turner Bartels K-8 Elementary School (Tiger)
- Twin Lakes Elementary School (Roadrunner)
- Valrico Elementary School (Hawk)
- Walden Lake Elementary School (Eagle)
- Warren Hope Dawson Elementary School (Dragon)
- West Shore Elementary School (Wildcat)
- West Tampa Elementary School (Greyhound)
- Westchase Elementary School (Wizard)
- Wilson Elementary School (Wildcat)
- Wimauma Elementary School (Wildcat)
- Witter Elementary School (Wildcat)
- Woodbridge Elementary School (Wildcat)
- Yates Elementary School (Eagle)

== Charter schools ==
- Advantage Academy of Hillsborough (Plant City)
- Anderson Elementary Academy
- Bell Creek Academy (Panther)
- Brooks-DeBartolo Collegiate High School (Phoenix)
- Carl Sagan Academy
- Channelside Academy of Math and Science (K-5)
- Channelside Middle School (6-8)
- Community Charter Middle School of Excellence
- Cristo Rey Tampa High School (Panther)
- Florida Autism Charter School of Excellence
- Focus Academy
- Henderson Hammock Charter School (Hawk)
- Hillsborough Academy of Math and Science
- Hope Preparatory Academy
- Horizon Charter School of Tampa
- Independence Academy (K-8)
- Kid's Community College
- King's Kids Academy of Health Sciences
- Learning Gate Community School
- Literacy/Leadership/Technology Academy
- Lutz Preparatory School
- Metropolitan Ministries
- Mount Pleasant Standard-Based Middle School
- New Springs Schools K-8
- Kiran C. Patel High School (Patel High School) (Trailblazers)
- Pepin Academies (Tampa Campus) (Falcon)
- Pepin Academies (Riverview Campus) (Falcon)
- Pivot Charter
- Rebirth Academy
- RCMA Leadership Academy
- RCMA Wimauma Academy
- Richardson Montessori Academy
- Riverview Academy of Math and Science (K-8)
- Seminole Heights Charter High School
- Shiloh Elementary Charter School
- Shiloh Middle Charter School
- Sunlake Academy of Math and Science (K-8)
- Tampa Transitional School of Excellence (Falcon)
- Terrace Community Middle School
- Trinity School for Children (Tornado)
- Town and Country Charter High School
- USF/Patel
- USF/Patel Intermediate
- Valrico Lake Advantage Academy
- Village of Excellence
- Walton Academy of the Performing Arts
- West University Charter High School
- Winthrop Charter (Lion)
- Winthrop College Preparatory Academy
- Woodmont Charter School

== Private schools ==
- Academic Achievement Center, Seffner (4-12)
- Academy of the Holy Names, Tampa (PreK-12) (Jaguar)
- American Youth Academy (PreK-12) (Eagle)
- Bayshore Christian School (PreK-12) (Faith Warrior)
- Baylife Academy, Seffner, Valrico (K-10)
- Beach Park Montessori School (PreK-8) (Poodle)
- Berkeley Preparatory School, Tampa (K-12) (Buccaneer)
- Bell Shoals Baptist Academy, Valrico (PreK-8) (Panther)
- Brandon Academy, Brandon (Scorpion)
- Brandon Christian Community School, Brandon (1-6)
- Brandon Homeschool Fellowship, Brandon (K-12)
- Cambridge Christian School, Tampa (K-12) (Lancer)
- Carrollwood Day School (PreK-12) (Falcon)
- Center Academy, Riverview (4-12)
- Central Baptist, Brandon (K-12) (Lion)
- Christ the King Catholic School (PreK-8) (Lion)
- Citrus Park Christian School (PreK-12)
- Corbett Preparatory School of IDS (PreK-8)
- CuttingEdge Learning Academy (K-12)
- East Bay Christian School, Riverview
- Faith Baptist Academy, Brandon
- Families Instructing Students at Home, Brandon (FISH)
- Family of Christ Christian School
- First Baptist Christian School, Gibsonton
- First Baptist Christian Academy, Brandon
- Florida College Academy, Temple Terrace (Falcon)
- Foundation Christian Academy, Valrico (Panther)
- Friendship Christian Academy, Tampa (K-12)
- Grace Christian School, Valrico (Patriot)
- Heritage Academy
- Hillsborough Baptist School, Seffner
- Incarnation Catholic School (K-8)
- Immanuel Lutheran School, Valrico
- Impact Academy, Seffner
- Jesuit High School of Tampa (9-12) (Tiger)
- Kings Avenue Christian School
- Lee Academy for Gifted Education (PreK-12)
- Legacy Christian Academy, Seffner (1-12)
- Libertas Academy (K-8)
- Lighthouse Center for Creative Learning
- Livingstone Academy
- LLT Academy
- Monet's Pond Montessori, Riverview (K-2)
- Nativity Catholic School, Brandon (PreK-8) (Cougar)
- New Jerusalem Christian Academy, Seffner (Eagle)
- North Tampa Christian Academy, Wesley Chapel (Titan)
- Northdale Christian Academy, Tampa (PreK-8)
- The Paideia School of Tampa Bay (K-12) (Warrior)
- Progress Village Christian Academy (K-4)
- Providence Christian School, Riverview (Knight)
- Riverview Montessori, Riverview (K-2)
- Ruskin Christian School, Ruskin (K-12) (Warrior)
- Seffner Christian Academy, Seffner (Crusader)
- St. John's Episcopal Parish Day School (Eagle)
- St. Lawrence Catholic School, Tampa (Celtic)
- St. Mary's Episcopal Day School (PreK-8) (Saint)
- St. Peter Claver Catholic School (PreK-8)
- St. Stephen Catholic School, Lithia
- Tampa Catholic High School (9-12) (Crusader)
- Tampa Bay Christian Academy (PreK-12)
- Tampa Christian Academy
- Tampa Bay Academy
- Tampa Bay HEAT
- Tampa Day School (K-8)
- Tampa Preparatory School (6-12) (Terrapin)
- Tropical Acres Christian Academy, Riverview
- Universal Academy Of Florida (Falcon)
- West Gate Christian School, Tampa (PreK-12) (Patriots)

== Historic schools ==
- Historic Bledsoe School - closed 1903, Plant City
- Bloomingdale Normal Institute - teachers' college, 1879-1891
- Historic Bloomingdale School - closed 1920, Valrico, now zoned to Bloomingdale, Riverview, Brandon, Newsome, and Durant
- Glover Negro School - Segregated "strawberry" school for Black Children
- Keysville Negro School - Segregated school for Black Children
- Historic Turkey Creek High School - 1873–1971, Plant City
- Historic Pinecrest High School - Lithia, now Newsome and Durant
- Plant City Negro School- later Wheatley High School, Segregated school for Black children
- Historic Pleasant Grove School - closed 1903, Plant City
- Don Thompson Vocational Senior High School - Segregated school for Black children
- Port Tampa Negro School - Segregated K-12 school for Black children, later became Frederick Douglass Elementary School
- Thonotosassa Negro School - Segregated school for Black children
- Wimauma Negro School - later Bethune Elementary School, Segregated school for Black children

== Colleges and universities ==
=== Universities ===
- Argosy University
- Everest University
- Nova Southeastern University
- South University - satellite campus in Tampa
- Stetson University - satellite campus in Tampa
- Stetson University College of Law
- Strayer University
- Thomas M. Cooley Law School - satellite campus of the University of Western Michigan
- Troy University
- University of South Florida
- University of Tampa
- Embry-Riddle: Tampa Campus*

=== Colleges ===
- The Art Institute
- Emmaus Baptist College in brandon
- Florida College
- Hillsborough Community College - multiple locations
- International Academy of Design & Technology
- Keiser University
- Remington College - Tampa Campus
- Sanford-Brown Institute
- Southwest Florida College
- Southern Technical Institute
- Tabernacle Bible College and Seminary in Brandon
- Jersey College - School of Nursing

== Sources ==
- http://www.sdhc.k12.fl.us/schools/
- https://web.archive.org/web/20131225123930/https://www.sdhc.k12.fl.us/charter/charterschools.asp
- http://www.homes101.net/florida-schools/hillsborough-county-school-district-d5837/
- http://www.privateschoolreview.com/county_high_schools/stateid/FL/county/12057
- http://www.greatschools.net/cgi-bin/fl/private/6800
- https://web.archive.org/web/20091206092713/http://www.sdhc.k12.fl.us/charter/pdf/charterschools.pdf
