= Brandon Cleveland =

American football player (born 2004)

No. 90 – Las Vegas Raiders
- Position: Defensive tackle
- Roster status: Practice squad

Personal information
- Born: August 27, 2004 (age 22)
- Listed height: 6 ft 4 in (1.93 m)
- Listed weight: 315 lb (143 kg)

Career information
- High school: Carrollwood Day School (Tampa, Florida)
- College: NC State (2022–2025)
- NFL draft: 2026: 7th round, 229th overall pick

Career history
- Las Vegas Raiders (2026–present)*
- * Offseason or practice squad member only
- Stats at Pro Football Reference

Brandon Cleveland (born August 27, 2004) is an American professional football defensive tackle for the Las Vegas Raiders of the National Football League (NFL). He played college football for the NC State Wolfpack and was selected by the Raiders in the seventh round of the 2026 NFL draft.

== Early life ==
Cleveland was born on August 27, 2004, and grew up in Tampa, Florida. His father died when he was 10 and he was raised by his single mother. Cleveland's cousin is former NFL player Tyrie Cleveland. He grew up playing football, baseball, soccer, and basketball. Cleveland first attended Seffner Christian Academy, where he played football as a two-way lineman, winning the regional title as a freshman while posting 76 tackles, 18 tackles-for-loss (TFLs) and 9.5 sacks as a sophomore. Cleveland then transferred to Carrollwood Day School, totaling 46 tackles, 18 TFLs and 11 sacks during the 2020 season. In his last year, 2021, he posted 50 tackles, 26 TFLs and eight sacks. Cleveland was ranked a four-star recruit and initially committed to play college football for the Miami Hurricanes before decommitting. He eventually signed to play for the NC State Wolfpack.

== College career ==
As a true freshman at NC State in 2022, Cleveland appeared in six games and posted seven tackles, one TFL and a half-sack. He then recorded 28 tackles, 4.5 TFLs and three sacks in 2023 while appearing in 13 games, one as a starter. He started all 13 games in 2024 and tallied 36 tackles, 3.5 TFLs and a half-sack. As a senior in 2025, Cleveland started 12 of 13 games and made a career-high seven TFLs and along with 36 tackles and two sacks. At the conclusion of his collegiate career, he was invited to the 2026 East–West Shrine Bowl.

== Professional career ==
Pre-draft measurables
Height	Weight	Arm length	Hand span	Wingspan	40-yard dash	10-yard split	20-yard split	20-yard shuttle	Vertical jump
6 ft 3 in (1.91 m)	307 lb (139 kg)	32 3/8 in (0.82 m)	9 1/4 in (0.23 m)	6 ft 5 1/4 in (1.96 m)	5.12 s	1.78 s	2.94 s	4.91 s	26.5 in (0.67 m)
All values from NFL Combine/Pro Day

Cleveland was selected by the Las Vegas Raiders in the seventh round with the 229th overall pick of the 2026 NFL draft. He was waived by Las Vegas on August 30, 2026, and re-signed to the practice squad.
