= Michael Trigg =

Michael Trigg may refer to:

- Michael Trigg (quarterback), American football quarterback and head coach
- Michael Trigg (tight end) (born 2002), American football tight end
