= Richard Gouraige =

American football player (born 1998)

No. 76 – St. Louis Battlehawks
- Position: Offensive tackle
- Roster status: Active

Personal information
- Born: October 15, 1998 (age 28); Tampa, Florida, U.S.
- Listed height: 6 ft 5 in (1.96 m)
- Listed weight: 308 lb (140 kg)

Career information
- High school: Cambridge Christian (Tampa)
- College: Florida (2018–2022)
- NFL draft: 2023: undrafted

Career history
- Buffalo Bills (2023–2025); St. Louis Battlehawks (2026–present)

Career NFL statistics as of 2024
- Games played: 1
- Stats at Pro Football Reference

Richard Gouraige (born October 15, 1998) is an American professional football offensive tackle for the St. Louis Battlehawks of the United Football League (UFL). He played college football for the Florida Gators.

== Early life ==
Gouraige grew up in Tampa, Florida and attended Cambridge Christian School where he lettered in football and basketball. He was rated a four-star recruit and committed to play college football at Florida over offers from Ole Miss, Clemson, North Carolina, Florida State and Alabama.

== College career ==
During Gouraige's true freshman season in 2018, he only appeared in two games and earned a redshirt. During the 2019 season, he appeared in 12 games and started five of them at left guard and made the record for the 16th passing offense in the country by blocking for an offense in 6.5 yards per play. During the 2020 season, he appeared and started in all 12 games. He finished the season by helping the Gators achieve the record of passing yards per game with 378.6 yards, ranking eighth nationally with 7.28 yards per play and ninth with 509.8 yards per game. During the 2021 season, he started 12 games at left tackle and finished the season by helping the offense stay in the top 16 offense, blocking for 717 total yards during a game against Samford which made this the second in program history and third most by a team that season. During the 2022 season, he played and started all 13 games at left tackle and finished the season with 1.3 sacks per game.

== Professional career ==
Pre-draft measurables
Height	Weight	Arm length	Hand span	Wingspan	40-yard dash	10-yard split	20-yard split	20-yard shuttle	Three-cone drill	Vertical jump	Broad jump	Bench press
6 ft 5 in (1.96 m)	306 lb (139 kg)	34 in (0.86 m)	10 in (0.25 m)	6 ft 9 1/8 in (2.06 m)	5.41 s	1.90 s	3.15 s	4.90 s	8.00 s	22.5 in (0.57 m)	8 ft 1 in (2.46 m)	24 reps
All values from NFL Combine/Pro Day

=== Buffalo Bills ===
On April 29, 2023, Gouraige was signed to the Buffalo Bills as an undrafted free agent after going unselected in the 2023 NFL draft. He signed a reserve/future contract with Buffalo on January 22, 2024.

On August 27, 2024, Gouraige was released by the Bills as part of final roster cuts, and re-signed to the practice squad.

Gouraige was elevated from the practice squad to the active roster for the November 17, 2024 game against the Kansas City Chiefs. He signed a reserve/future contract on January 28, 2025.

On August 26, 2025, Gouraige was released by the Bills as part of final roster cuts. He was re-signed to the practice squad on December 24. Gouraige was released by Buffalo on January 6, 2026.

=== St. Louis Battlehawks ===
On January 14, 2026, Gouraige was selected by the St. Louis Battlehawks of the United Football League (UFL).
