= Charter School Associates =

Charter school operator in Florida, US

Coordinates: 26.2342°N 80.2551°W

Charter School Associates (CSA) is a charter school operator headquartered in Sunrise, Florida. It is led by Michael Strader.

== Schools ==
- Advantage Academy of Hillsborough in Plant City
- Bell Creek Academy in Riverview, Florida
- Channelside Academy of Math and Science
- Everglades Preparatory Academy
- Hillsborough Academy of Math and Science
- Palm Glades Academy
- Pemayetv Emahakv Middle
- Pemayetv Emahakv Our Way Charter School
- Pinellas Academy of Math and Science
- Santa Fe Advantage Academy
- Shiloh Charter School in Plant City
- Summerville Advantage Academy
- The Charter School at Waterstone
- Valrico Lake Advantage Academy
- Viera Charter School
- West Broward Academy
