= Alexander Muss High School in Israel =

Location
- Aliyat Hano'ar St. 9 Hod Hasharon; Israel

Information
- Established: 1972

Alexander Muss High School in Hod HaSharon, Israel is a pluralistic study-abroad program in Hod HaSharon, Israel, for high school students. Programs run throughout the year and range in length from 6 weeks to 18 weeks. The school is accredited by the Middle States Association and students can continue in their high school subjects while abroad. Students are also eligible to earn college credit through the University of Miami. Its flagship campus is in Israel and the campus is shared between Alexander Muss and Mosenson youth village. The school has an average enrollment of 1200 students, which has decreased since the war in Gaza. It has four dormitories and a mini-dorm, and is a college prep program for international high school students. Alexander Muss prioritizes safety for their students and works directly with trusted Israeli security authority which is employed by the Ministry of Education who is in constant contact with the IDF and Police. Having merged with Jewish National Fund (JNF) USA in 2013, AMHSI-JNF has begun its global expansion for all high school students.

== History ==
Alexander Muss High School in Israel was founded in 1972 by Rabbi Morris Kipper in concert with the Greater Miami Jewish Federation. The concept of teaching history onsite where history took place presented engaging educational opportunities to connect students to the history and culture of Israel. The school soon grew beyond its Florida roots to be a nationwide program, and welcomes students from across North America, Canada, Australia, and Europe. It also partners with day schools and community groups to customize programs according to each group's needs.

== Day school and community programs ==
The school has customized academic Israel programs for student groups from JFS (school) in London, United Kingdom, Adelson Educational Campus in Las Vegas, NV, American Hebrew Academy in Greensboro, NC, Charles E. Smith Jewish Day School in Rockville, MD, David Posnack Jewish Day School in Davie, FL, The Emery/Weiner School in Houston, TX, Gann Academy in Waltham, MA, Jack M. Barrack Hebrew Academy in Bryn Mawr, PA, Milken Community High School in Los Angeles, CA, Weber School in Atlanta, GA, Bialik College in Melbourne, Australia.

== Notable alumni ==
- Arick Wierson – Columnist for CNN, Emmy Award-winning television producer, former advisor to New York City Mayor Michael Bloomberg
- Benj Gershman – Bass guitarist of O.A.R.
- Brett Ratner – Film producer and director
- Chris Culos – Drummer of O.A.R.
- Debra Zane – Casting director
- Lauren Weisberger – author of The Devil Wears Prada
- Lisa Miller – Author of The Spiritual Child and Columbia University Professor
- Marc Roberge – Lead singer of O.A.R.
- Matisyahu - Jewish-American Musician
- Michael Levin - American-Israeli Soldier
- Sheryl Sandberg – Chief Operating Officer of Facebook
- Wayne Firestone - American Playwright & Non-Profit Leader
