= Geronimo Allison =

American football player (born 1994)

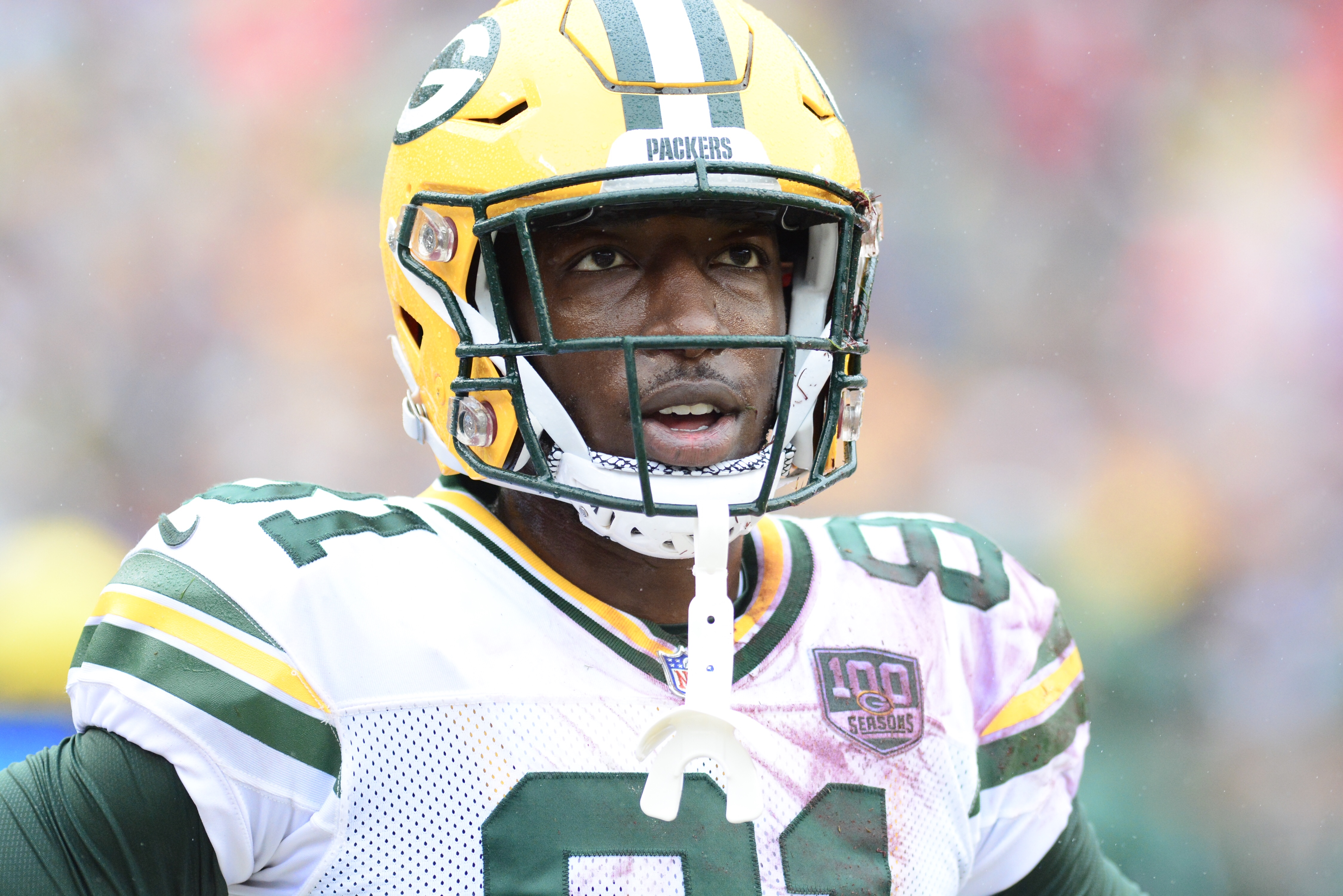
- Allison with the Green Bay Packers in 2018

No. 81, 13, 18
- Position: Wide receiver

Personal information
- Born: January 18, 1994 (age 32); Tampa, Florida, U.S.
- Listed height: 6 ft 3 in (1.91 m)
- Listed weight: 202 lb (92 kg)

Career information
- High school: Spoto (Riverview, Florida)
- College: Iowa Western CC (2012–2013); Illinois (2014–2015)
- NFL draft: 2016: undrafted

Career history
- Green Bay Packers (2016–2019); Detroit Lions (2020–2021); Atlanta Falcons (2022)*; Vegas Vipers (2023); Saskatchewan Roughriders (2024)*
- * Offseason or practice squad member only

Career NFL statistics
- Receptions: 89
- Receiving yards: 1,045
- Receiving touchdowns: 6
- Stats at Pro Football Reference

Geronimo John Allison (born January 18, 1994) is an American former professional football player who was a wide receiver in the National Football League (NFL). He played college football at Illinois and was signed by the Green Bay Packers in 2016 as an undrafted free agent. Allison was also a member of the Detroit Lions, Atlanta Falcons, Vegas Vipers, and Saskatchewan Roughriders.

== Early life ==
In an interview with The News-Gazette, Allison said his mother, Melissa Glover, gave him his first name because she wanted to give him "a unique name". Allison credits his mother with instilling his religious faith, which Allison expresses in post-game prayers with opponents and teammates at midfield.

Allison attended Spoto High School in Riverview, Florida. He was academically ineligible as a sophomore and junior, but worked in private classes with the coach's wife, Anne Caparaso, to improve his grades and had a successful senior season.

== College career ==
Due to his academic struggles in high school, Allison began college at Iowa Western Community College in Council Bluffs, Iowa. He proved to be a bright student, finishing an associate degree in just three semesters. Allison also led the team to a 22–1 record in two seasons, an NJCAA title, and led the conference in receptions, yards, and touchdowns in his second year.

Allison transferred to the University of Illinois Urbana-Champaign, where he played for the Fighting Illini in 2014 and 2015. As a junior, Allison was usually the second option to freshman star Mike Dudek, though Allison caught five touchdowns to Dudek's six for the 6–7 Illini. In Week 3, he had a career-high six receptions for 160 yards and two touchdowns in a lopsided loss to Washington. Allison took over the top spot his senior year, replacing the injured Dudek for 882 yards but only three touchdowns during the 5–7 campaign. Allison had over 90 receiving yards in five of the first seven games, but five or fewer receptions in the final five games of the season. He was an All-Big Ten Conference honorable mention, and won the team's Service Above Self award.

=== College statistics ===
Year	Team	Games		Receiving				
Year	Team	G	GS	Rec	Yds	Avg	Lng	TD
2014	Illinois	13	12	41	598	14.6	60	5
2015	Illinois	12	11	65	882	13.6	53	3
Total		24	22	106	1,480	14.0	60	8
Source: FightingIllini.com

== Professional career ==
External videos
- Allison's NFL Combine workout

Pre-draft measurables
Height	Weight	Arm length	Hand span	40-yard dash	10-yard split	20-yard split	20-yard shuttle	Three-cone drill	Vertical jump	Broad jump	Wonderlic
6 ft 3 1/4 in (1.91 m)	196 lb (89 kg)	32 7/8 in (0.84 m)	9 1/2 in (0.24 m)	4.67 s	1.65 s	2.74 s	4.28 s	7.40 s	33 in (0.84 m)	10 ft 7 in (3.23 m)	13
All values are from NFL Combine

=== Green Bay Packers ===
==== 2016 season ====
After going undrafted in the 2016 NFL draft, Allison signed with the Green Bay Packers on May 6, 2016. On September 3, he was released by the Packers during final team cuts, but was re-signed to the Packers' practice squad two days later.

On October 24, Allison was promoted from the practice squad to the active roster. He made his NFL debut against the Atlanta Falcons in Week 8. His first career NFL reception came as a four-yard touchdown from Aaron Rodgers in the second quarter. Allison finished the narrow 33–32 road loss with two receptions for 21 yards and the aforementioned touchdown.

Allison finished his rookie year with 12 receptions for 202 yards and two touchdowns in 19 games and two starts. In the postseason, Allison had five receptions for 65 yards before the Packers lost on the road to the Falcons in the NFC Championship Game by a score of 44–21.

==== 2017 season ====
On July 19, 2017, Allison was suspended for the first game of the 2017 season for violating the league's substance-abuse policy. During a Week 3 27–24 overtime victory over the Cincinnati Bengals, he had career-highs with six receptions and 122 yards.

Allison finished his second professional season with 23 receptions for 253 yards in 15 games and two starts. Allison's 23 receptions finished fourth among Packers receivers on the season.

==== 2018 season ====
Allison was re-signed by the Packers on March 14, 2018. He started the season well, with 19 receptions for 289 yards and two touchdowns before suffering a concussion during a Week 3 31–17 road loss to the Washington Redskins. On November 6, 2018, Allison was placed on injured reserve after undergoing groin surgery.

Allison finished the 2018 season with 20 receptions for 303 yards and two touchdowns in five games and four starts.

==== 2019 season ====
On March 13, 2019, Allison was re-signed by the Packers. He finished the 2019 season with 34 receptions for 287 yards and two touchdowns in 16 games and six starts. In the postseason, Allison had three receptions for 19 yards before the Packers lost on the road to the San Francisco 49ers in the NFC Championship Game by a score of 37–20.

=== Detroit Lions ===
On April 6, 2020, Allison signed a one-year contract with the Detroit Lions. On August 2, Allison announced that he would opt out of the 2020 season due to the COVID-19 pandemic.

On August 31, 2021, Allison was released by the Lions. He was re-signed to the practice squad on September 15. Allison was promoted to the active roster on October 20. He was released on November 16 and was re-signed to the practice squad.

=== Atlanta Falcons ===
On May 16, 2022, Allison signed with the Falcons. He was released on August 23.

=== Vegas Vipers ===
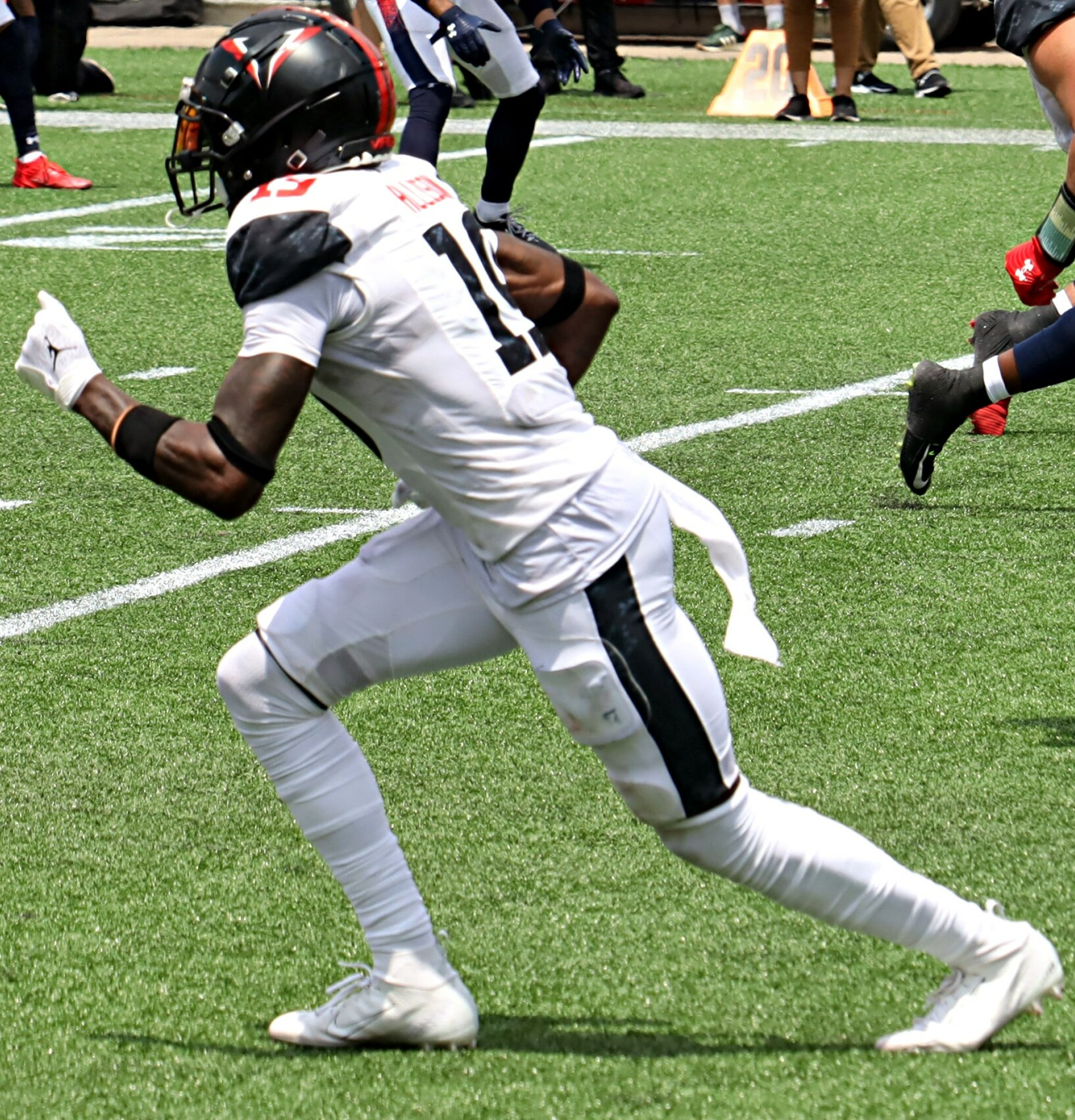
Allison in 2023

Allison was signed by the Vegas Vipers of the XFL on January 21, 2023. The Vipers folded when the XFL and United States Football League merged to create the United Football League (UFL).

=== Saskatchewan Roughriders ===
On January 19, 2024, Allison signed with the Saskatchewan Roughriders of the Canadian Football League (CFL). He was released on June 1.

== Career statistics ==
=== NFL ===
==== Regular season ====
Year	Team	Games		Receiving					Fumbles	
Year	Team	GP	GS	Rec	Yds	Avg	Lng	TD	Fum	Lost
2016	GB	10	2	12	202	16.8	39	2	0	0
2017	GB	15	2	23	253	11.0	72	0	2	0
2018	GB	5	4	20	303	15.2	64	2	1	0
2019	GB	16	6	34	287	8.4	31	2	2	1
2020	DET	0	0	Did not play due to COVID-19 Opt Out						
2021	DET	3	1	0	0	0.0	0	0	0	0
Career		49	15	89	1,045	11.7	72	6	4	1

==== Postseason ====
Year	Team	Games		Receiving					Fumbles	
Year	Team	GP	GS	Rec	Yds	Avg	Lng	TD	Fum	Lost
2016	GB	3	1	5	65	13.0	26	0	0	0
2019	GB	2	0	3	19	6.3	19	0	0	0
Career		5	1	8	84	10.5	26	0	0	0
