= Wayne Firestone =

American playwright and non-profit executive

Wayne L. Firestone is an American playwright and veteran non-profit leader. He co-produces and hosts The America-Israel Friendship League’s (AIFL) live webinars created during the COVID Pandemic— over two hundred episodes since March 2020. He served as Executive Director of AIFL 2019-2021. In March 2022, he was named the Jewish Plays Project inaugural 21st Century Playwright Fellow. An alumnus of three Kennedy Center Playwriting Intensive cohorts, his plays have appeared in festivals in New York, Washington, DC, Israel and the United Kingdom. A member of the Dramatists Guild of America, in 2018 he founded Plays2Gather to perform diverse stories in homes and non-traditional venues.

Previously, Firestone served as the president and CEO of Hillel: The Foundation for Jewish Campus Life, the largest Jewish student organization in the world with more than 500 college campus affiliates across the globe; CEO of DC based International Lifeline Fund; and President of the Genesis Prize Foundation.

== Early life ==
Firestone grew up in North Miami Beach, Florida, where he participated in the B'nai B'rith Youth Organization (BBYO) and an educational study abroad experience through the Alexander Muss High School in Israel program.

As an undergraduate at the University of Miami, Firestone focused on Judaic studies, politics and public affairs. During two semesters at Tel Aviv University, he learned that a refusenik in the Soviet Union had been imprisoned for teaching Hebrew. This inspired him to write a play called "Trial and Error," which he later produced on dozens of campuses in North America, working with a coalition of diverse student groups to spread the word. In recognition of his student activism, Hillel granted him membership in the 1985-1986 B'nai B'rith Hillel National Student Secretariat.

After graduating from the Georgetown University Law Center, Firestone served from 1990 to 1994 as the lead case management associate in complex multinational litigation with Patton Boggs LLP, in Washington, D.C. There he developed clients' international trade strategies under the U.S.-Israel Free Trade Agreement.

== Israel ==
In 1993 Firestone moved to Israel. During his seven years there, he worked in Jewish communal affairs, high-tech expansion, and academia, including as an administrator and adjunct lecturer at Technion, the Israel Institute of Technology. From 1998 to 2001, he helped to strengthen Israel's high-tech industry as founder and CEO of Silicon Wadinet, Ltd., a firm that helped foster the capitalization and growth of technology companies. From 2001 to 2002, he served as director of the Israel Regional Office of the Anti-Defamation League.

In September 2002, Firestone returned to the U.S. to serve as Executive Director of the Israel on Campus Coalition, a partnership between Hillel and the Charles and Lynn Schusterman Family Foundation that brings together 35 pro-Israel groups working on college campuses.

== Hillel ==
In 2005, Firestone was named Executive Vice President of Hillel. In that role he directed the organization's U.S. operations and helped craft the organization's comprehensive five-year Strategic Plan.

In 2006, Firestone was appointed president and CEO of Hillel. His tenure focused on shifting Hillel from being a place where Jewishly identified students can come to do Jewish things, to being a force that goes out where Jewish students are and helps them have meaningful Jewish experiences. Innovative initiatives emerging from this effort include the Campus Entrepreneurship Initiative and the Senior Jewish Educators program, which have twice been honored with the Slingshot Award, and Ask Big Questions, which was named by Craigslist founder Craig Newmark one of the 12 major organizations to change the world in 2012. Firestone also focused on expanding Hillel's global network. Firestone announced in September 2012 that he would resign, effective June 2013.

== Genesis Prize ==
In April 2013, Firestone was named President of the Genesis Prize Foundation, which is a $1 million annual award in cooperation with the Israeli Government and the Jewish Agency for Israel.

"The Genesis Prize seeks to recognize individuals who have attained excellence and international renown in their chosen professional fields, and whose actions, in addition to their achievements, embody the character of the Jewish people through commitment to Jewish values, the Jewish community and/or to the State of Israel. Beyond demonstrated qualities of achievement and commitment, the Genesis Prize, in keeping with the Jewish values for which it stands, serves to recognize the laureate's contribution to the betterment of mankind. The Prize, in the amount of $1 million US — endowed by the Genesis Philanthropy Group and awarded annually by the Prime Minister of Israel to a single individual— is administered by a unique partnership, which includes the Office of the Prime Minister of the State of Israel, the Genesis Philanthropy Group, and the Office of the Chairman of the Jewish Agency for Israel. Through this partnership and a worldwide nomination process, the goal of the Genesis Prize is to inspire unity throughout the global Jewish community."

== Publications ==
Firestone's articles and publications include "Blurring Boundaries: Creating and Consuming" in Sh'ma magazine; "Engaging a New Generation: Hillel Innovates for the Millennials," published by the Jewish Communal Service Association of North America; "Peoplehood: What Students Can Learn and Teach," published by United Jewish Communities; and "Organizing On Campus," published by Jewish Family & Life (JFL Media).

Firestone's op-eds have been published by outlets such as the Jewish Telegraphic Agency, New York Jewish Week, Washington Jewish Week, the Forward, Times of Israel, e-JewishPhilanthropy and the Chronicle of Higher Education
