= Michael Trigg (tight end) =

American football player (born 2002)

No. 46 – Dallas Cowboys
- Position: Tight end
- Roster status: Practice squad

Personal information
- Born: June 27, 2002 (age 24)
- Listed height: 6 ft 4 in (1.93 m)
- Listed weight: 240 lb (109 kg)

Career information
- High school: Carrollwood Day (Tampa, Florida)
- College: USC (2021); Ole Miss (2022–2023); Baylor (2024–2025)
- NFL draft: 2026: undrafted

Career history
- Dallas Cowboys (2026–present)*
- * Offseason or practice squad member only

Awards and highlights
- First-team All-Big 12 (2025); Second-team All-Big 12 (2024)
- Stats at Pro Football Reference

Michael Justice Trigg (born June 27, 2002) is an American professional football tight end. He played college football for the USC Trojans, Ole Miss Rebels, and Baylor Bears. He went undrafted in the 2026 NFL draft.

== Early life ==
Trigg grew up in Tampa, Florida and initially attended Seffner Christian Academy. He had 82 receptions for 1,232 yards with 16 touchdown receptions as a junior. Trigg transferred to Carrollwood Day School prior to his senior year. Trigg caught 30 passes for 586 yards and five touchdowns in seven games during his senior season. He committed to play college football at USC after considering offers from LSU and South Carolina. Trigg was also considered to be a Division I prospect in basketball. He is the nephew of the rapper Plies who played at Miami Ohio in the 90s.

== College career ==
=== USC ===
Trigg began his collegiate career at USC. He caught seven passes for 109 yards and a touchdown as a freshman. Following the end of the season, Trigg entered the NCAA transfer portal.

=== Ole Miss ===
Trigg ultimately transferred to Ole Miss.

On September 26, 2023, it was announced that Trigg was no longer with the team. On December 23, he would enter the transfer portal for the second time.

=== Baylor ===
On January 15, 2024, Trigg announced that he would transfer to Baylor. He was a first team All-Big 12 selection in 2025, with 50 catches for 694 yards and six touchdowns. Trigg was a finalist for the John Mackey Award.

=== College statistics ===
Season	Team	GP	Receiving			
Season	Team	GP	Rec	Yds	Avg	TD
2021	USC	6	7	109	15.6	1
2022	Ole Miss	7	17	156	9.2	3
2023	Ole Miss	3	4	65	16.3	1
2024	Baylor	11	30	395	13.2	3
2025	Baylor	11	50	694	13.9	6
Career		38	108	1,419	13.6	14

== Professional career ==
Pre-draft measurables
Height	Weight	Arm length	Hand span	Wingspan	Vertical jump
6 ft 3 3/4 in (1.92 m)	240 lb (109 kg)	34 1/4 in (0.87 m)	10 1/2 in (0.27 m)	7 ft 0 3/8 in (2.14 m)	27.5 in (0.70 m)
All values from NFL Combine/Pro Day

After not being selected in the 2026 NFL draft, Trigg was signed by the Dallas Cowboys as an undrafted free agent. On August 30, he was waived by the Cowboys as a part of final roster cuts. Trigg was re–signed to Dallas' practice squad the following day.
