= Jon Feliciano =

American football player (born 1992)

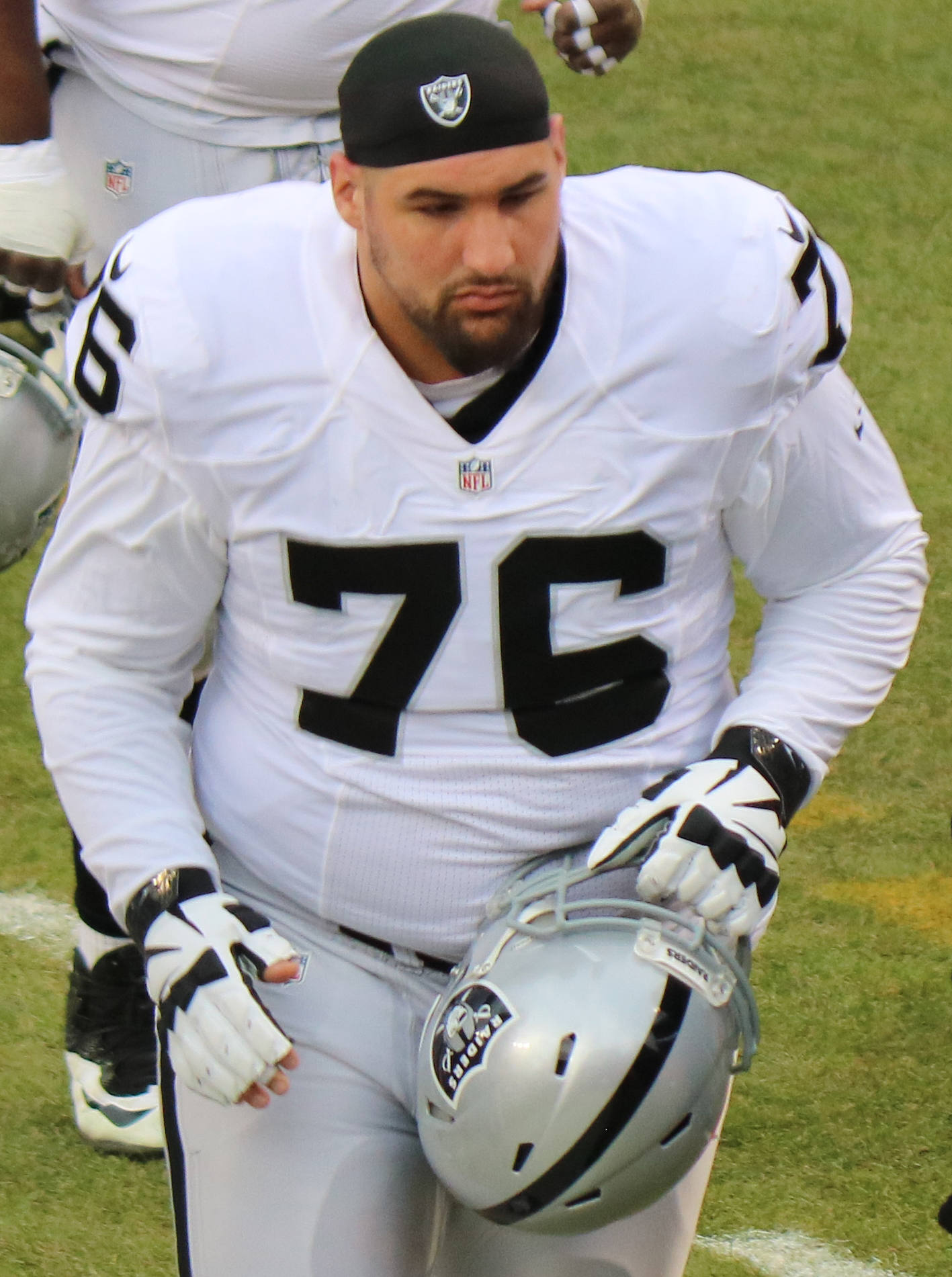
- Feliciano with the Oakland Raiders in 2016

No. 68, 76, 55
- Position: Guard

Personal information
- Born: February 10, 1992 (age 34); East Meadow, New York, U.S.
- Listed height: 6 ft 4 in (1.93 m)
- Listed weight: 325 lb (147 kg)

Career information
- High school: Western (Davie, Florida)
- College: Miami (FL) (2010–2014)
- NFL draft: 2015: 4th round, 128th overall pick

Career history
- Oakland Raiders (2015–2018); Buffalo Bills (2019–2021); New York Giants (2022); San Francisco 49ers (2023–2024)

Career NFL statistics
- Games played: 113
- Games started: 61
- Stats at Pro Football Reference

Jon Feliciano (born February 10, 1992) is an American former professional football player who was a guard for 10 seasons in the National Football League (NFL) for the Oakland Raiders, Buffalo Bills, New York Giants, and San Francisco 49ers. He played college football for the Miami Hurricanes and was selected by the Raiders in the fourth round of the 2015 NFL draft.

== Early life ==
Feliciano was born in East Meadow, New York. Jon’s father Rafael Feliciano, a former MTA bus driver is of Puerto Rican descent, while his mother is of Sicilian descent. Jon along with his Mom and younger brother moved to South Florida in the mid-90s. As a child, Feliciano was more interested in designing and playing video games and basketball than in football.

In the early 2000s, Jon and his family moved to Davie, Florida where he eventually enrolled at Western High School, playing basketball and football.

Throughout his adolescence, Feliciano’s mother’s battle with cancer, spotty employment, and his brother’s health challenges caused a great deal of financial and emotional strain on the family. In 2008, his mother returned to New York while Feliciano willingly remained in Davie to complete his high school career. Throughout these formative years, Feliciano dealt with periods of homelessness and hunger.

Considered a three-star recruit and number 19 offensive guard by Scout.com, he was also considered a three-star prospect by Rivals.com and ranked as the 55th best offensive tackle in the nation. Feliciano was also named to First-team All-Broward by Sun Sentinel. Despite having received offers from the University of Akron, Florida International University and San Diego State University, to name a few, Feliciano’s heart was set on being a Hurricane. Encouraged by his best friend Sean Cole and accompanied by his coach Rashad West, Feliciano attended the 2008 University of Miami spring scrimmage with his highlight tape in hand. Catching the eye of coach Tommie Robinson, he was given a scholarship to play for the University of Miami.

== College career ==
Feliciano sat out his true freshman season, participating on the practice squad. Officially joining the team in 2011, he played in 10 games, starting eight of them. He finished that season with the overall grade of 84%. Feliciano allowed zero sacks on the season.

In 2012, he started all 12 games at left guard. Feliciano anchored an offensive line that paved way for the third-best passing offense (295.4) and fifth-best total offense (440.2) in the Atlantic Coast Conference (ACC). He closed the season earning All-ACC honorable mention from the ACSMA.

Feliciano started all 13 games during the 2013 season, making 11 starts at left guard and two starts at right tackle. He once again helped anchor an offensive line that paved way for Hurricanes offense that averaged 425.8 yards of total offense and 33.8 points per game. Feliciano once again earned All-ACC honorable mention from the ACSMA.

In May 2014, Feliciano graduated from the University of Miami with a bachelor’s degree in Human Resources Management.

In his final season with the Hurricanes, Feliciano started 12 games, splitting time between left guard, left tackle, and right tackle. He made his final collegiate career start in the ‘Duck Commander Independence Bowl’ against South Carolina, helping lead the Hurricane offense to 422 total yards.

== Professional career ==
Pre-draft measurables
Height	Weight	Arm length	Hand span	40-yard dash	10-yard split	20-yard split	20-yard shuttle	Vertical jump	Broad jump	Bench press
6 ft 3 7/8 in (1.93 m)	323 lb (147 kg)	32 3/8 in (0.82 m)	9 3/4 in (0.25 m)	5.32 s	1.89 s	3.09 s	4.74 s	26.5 in (0.67 m)	8 ft 1 in (2.46 m)	23 reps
All values from NFL Combine/Pro Day

=== Oakland Raiders ===
Feliciano was drafted by the Oakland Raiders in the fourth round, 128th overall, in the 2015 NFL draft.

On December 22, 2017, Feliciano was placed on injured reserve.

In 2018, Feliciano played in 13 games, starting four at left guard in place of an injured Kelechi Osemele. He was placed on injured reserve on December 11, 2018, with a calf injury.

=== Buffalo Bills ===
On March 13, 2019, Feliciano signed a two-year $8 million contract with the Buffalo Bills.

In 2019, Feliciano started all 16 games at right guard for the Bills. Feliciano also earned his first Pro Bowl ballot mention.

After suffering a shoulder injury and torn pectoral muscle, Feliciano's 2020 season started when activated on October 27. He had nine starts. Feliciano earned his second Pro Bowl ballot mention and was the Bills' 2020 Ed Block Courage Award recipient.

On March 14, 2021, Feliciano signed a three-year, $17 million contract extension with the Bills.

Feliciano entered the 2021 season as the Bills starting left guard. He was placed on injured reserve on November 6, 2021, with a calf injury. He was activated on December 11.

Feliciano was released by the Bills on March 9, 2022.

=== New York Giants ===
On March 16, 2022, Feliciano signed a one-year contract with the New York Giants.

=== San Francisco 49ers ===
On March 21, 2023, Feliciano signed a one-year contract with the San Francisco 49ers. On May 18, the 49ers announced that Feliciano would be deployed as a guard in 2023. Feliciano was a starter in Super Bowl LVIII. The 49ers lost to the Chiefs 25–22 in overtime.

On March 18, 2024, Feliciano re-signed with the 49ers. He was placed on injured reserve on August 28.

On February 20, 2025, Feliciano announced his retirement from the NFL.
