= Newpoint Schools =

School district in Florida, United States

Coordinates: 30.1909°N 85.7001°W

Newpoint Schools, a chain of charter schools, were located throughout Florida. They included:

- Newpoint Bay High (9-12) It, along with all other Newpoint schools, utilized the Apex Learning online curriculum.
- Newpoint Pinellas High (9-12)
- Newpoint Tampa High (9-12)
- Newpoint Pensacola High (9-12)
- Newpoint Bay Academy (6-8)
- Newpoint Pensacola Academy (6-8)

The schools used individualized learning and project based learning methods.

In October, 2018, the owner of Newport Schools, Marcus May, was convicted of two counts of racketeering and one count of organized fraud in what the judge described as a "shocking pattern of pervasive theft." As CEO, May created shell companies to secretly position himself as a vendor to his schools, selling it goods at up to three times the fair price. He laundered the money and kept most of the profit. His personal wealth went from about $200,000 in 2010 to $8.9 million in 2015. He spent the money on yachts, luxury cars, houses in Florida and a Rolex. He was convicted by the testimony of 75 witnesses in a three-week trial. The money had come from public education funds, but it was meant to be spent on supplies and furniture for the students. May also inflated enrollment numbers to receive more public money for the schools. All the schools were either closed or placed under new management, disrupting the lives and education of one thousand students at Pinellas alone.
