= Pinellas Academy of Math and Science =

Charter school in Florida, United States

Address
- 1775 S Highland Ave; Largo, Pinellas County, Florida 33756; United States
- Coordinates: 27°55′57″N 82°46′25″W

Information
- Type: Charter
- School district: Pinellas County Schools
- NCES District ID: 1201560
- School code: FL-52-7291
- NCES School ID: 120156008100
- Principal: Tara Glackin
- Faculty: 55 (on an FTE basis)
- Grades: KG-8
- Enrollment: 879 (2022-2023)
  - Kindergarten: 98
  - Grade 1: 104
  - Grade 2: 108
  - Grade 3: 125
  - Grade 4: 106
  - Grade 5: 87
  - Grade 6: 94
  - Grade 7: 84
  - Grade 8: 73
- Student to teacher ratio: 15.98:1
- Campus type: City: small
- Website: www.pinellasacademy.com

Pinellas Academy of Math and Science (PAMS) is a charter-public school in Clearwater, Florida, United States.
