= Paideia Classical Christian School =

Location
- Tampa, Florida; United States
- 28.019°N 82.395°W

Information
- Type: Private classical Christian
- Religious affiliation: Christian non-denominational
- Established: 2005
- Head of School: Adam Keffer, Interim Head
- Faculty: 20
- Enrollment: 110
- Campus: Suburban
- Colors: Red, Blue and Gold
- Website: www.paideiatampa.com

Paideia Classical Christian School is a private, classical Christian school serving grades K–12, located in Tampa, Florida, United States. Paideia is the Koine Greek word for "education.” The school uses classical education techniques, based on a traditional Christian philosophy, to teach logical thinking, elegant speech, and persuasive writing.

== Memberships and affiliations ==
- Association of Classical Christian Schools
- Educational Records Bureau

== Sources ==
- Official link
- The Association of Classical and Christian Schools
- GreatSchools.Net
