= Western High School (Florida) =

Public high school located in Davie, Florida, United States

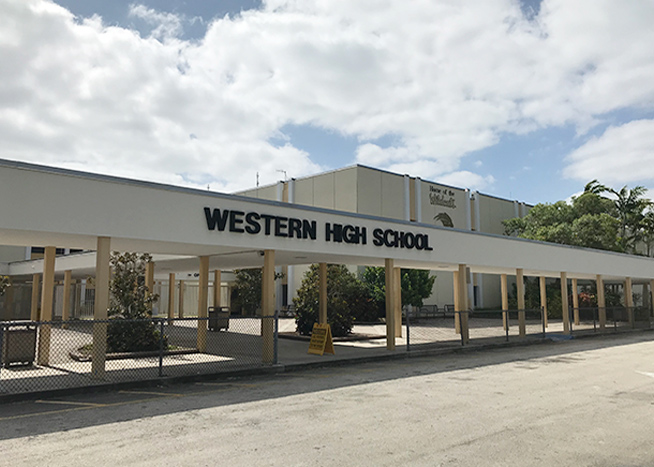

Location
- 1200 Southwest 136 Avenue; Davie, Florida 33325; United States; 26°06′18″N 80°19′43″W

Information
- Type: Public High school
- Opened: 1981
- School district: Broward County Public Schools
- Superintendent: Howard Hepburn
- Principal: Michelle Padura
- Staff: 144.00 (FTE)
- Grades: 9–12
- Enrollment: 3,642 (2023–24)
- Student to teacher ratio: 24.76
- Colors: Black; Vegas Gold
- Team name: Wildcats
- Website: western.browardschools.com

Western High School is a public high school in Davie, Florida, United States. It serves students in grades 9 through 12. The school, opened in 1981, is a part of the Broward County Public Schools district.

The principal is Michelle Padura. The school's mascot is the Wildcat, and the official colors are Black and Vegas Gold. Western High received a Florida Department of Education school grade of "A" for the 2019 academic year.

Its attendance boundary includes most of Davie, portions of Sunrise, and Weston.

== Demographics ==
As of the 2023–24 school year, the total student enrollment was 3,642. The ethnic makeup during the 2021–2022 school year was 82.6% White, 9.1% Black, 4.9% Hispanic, 4.1% Asian, 3.4% Multiracial, 0.5% Native American or Native Alaskan, and 0.3% Native Hawaiian or Pacific Islander.

== Athletics ==
The school offers athletic programs in football, cheerleading, basketball, tennis, soccer, color guard, swimming, water polo, golf, wrestling, baseball, softball, track & field, cross country, marching band, and volleyball. In the fall of 2002, the school's first state championship title was earned by the women's golf team. The Lady Wildcats were undefeated that year as well.

The 2024 competitive cheerleading squad won the FHSAA State Championship in the 2a medium coed division.

== Arts ==
The Western High School band program includes concert band, the Pride of the Wildcats marching band (formerly the Western Star Regiment), color guard, winter guard, and an indoor percussion program.

The chorus program offers three levels of vocal ensembles: Beginner's Chorus; Women's Choir; and Western Singers, the elite course offered to veterans of the chorus program.

== Notable alumni ==
- Leslie Grace, recording artist
- Jacob Jeffries (Groten), recording artist
- Ryan Sadowski, professional baseball player (San Francisco Giants)
- Jon Feliciano, professional football player (New York Giants)
- Christian Breslauer, American music director
- Fabian Moreau, professional football player (Atlanta Falcons)
- Nick Lucena, professional beach volleyball player
