= Port Tampa Negro School =

School for African-American children

Port Tampa Negro School was a school for African-American students in Tampa, Florida.

== History ==
In 1938, the school was nearly destroyed by a fire. Damages were estimated at $2500 to $3500.

In 1948, the school was upgraded with $40,000 as a part of a larger bond issue. Three new classrooms were added, including one longer classroom to be used as for larger assemblies. It also included a small kitchen and janitor's room, and was then upgraded to nine grades. Junior high students were transported to nearby Carver Negro Junior High. In the 1950s it briefly served as a high school.

In 1959 the Hillsborough County Public Schools provided Port Tampa residents with a school made completely of portables. Parents asked their children to be provided with an acceptable school or to be sent to a White School, specifically West Shore, which was largely empty at the time. District superintendent J. Crockett Farnell responded that "We have provided a school for these people and they are supposed to attend". parents protested the school district's move to educate the students in all-portable buildings with a boycott.
