= Bayshore Christian School =

Segregation academy in Florida, United States

Location
- 3909 South MacDill Avenue; Tampa, Hillsborough County, Florida 33611; United States; 27°54′26″N 82°29′45″W

Information
- Type: Private high school
- Established: 1971; 55 years ago
- Principal: Melanie Humenansky
- Grades: PK–12
- Enrollment: 226 (2012)
- Campus size: 10 acres (4.0 ha)
- Colors: Maroon and Gold
- Team name: Faith Warriors
- Rivals: Seffner Christian Cambridge Christian School (Florida)
- Accreditation: Southern Association of Colleges and Schools, Association of Christian Schools International (ACSI), Florida Council of Independent Schools
- Website: bayshorechristianschool.org

Bayshore Christian School is a private Christian school in central Tampa, Florida, United States, providing education for children from pre-kindergarten to grade 12. The school was founded as a middle school in 1971 as a segregation academy when the court ordered racial integration of public schools required white middle school children to be bused to formerly black schools. According to the Bayshore Christian School's own website, the school reported a diversity rate of approximately 41% during the 2025–2026 school year.

As of 2024, the school served 412 students, 87 of whom were at the high school level. The student-teacher ratio was 12.7.

== History ==
In a 1992 interview, principal Herman Valdes acknowledged the school was established in response to desegregation bussing.

== Athletics ==
Bayshore Christian has won FHSAA state championships in volleyball four times. Bayshore offers a variety of Varsity and JV sports teams ranging from Basketball, Volleyball, Golf, Soccer, and more. Bayshore is also a part of TBCAL for younger students.
