= Seacoast Christian Academy =

Location
- 8057 Arlington Expressway; Jacksonville, Florida 32211; United States

Information
- School type: Private Christian
- Established: 1993
- Founder: Dwight and Connie Cenac
- CEEB code: 100777
- Administrator: Joette Williams (since June 1, 2022); (2016-2019)
- Principal: Samuel Gaskins (since July 1, 2024)
- Teaching staff: 34 (FTE) (as of 2019-20)
- Grades: K1-12
- Enrollment: 338 (2019-20)
- Average class size: 25
- Student to teacher ratio: 11.6 (as of 2007-08)
- Colors: Blue, Yellow and White
- Athletics: Florida Christian Athletic League
- Mascot: Eagle
- Website: www.seacoastchristianacademy.com

Seacoast Christian Academy is a private Christian school located in Jacksonville, Florida, United States. Seacoast Christian Academy serves students in prekindergarten through grade 12.

== Campus ==
Seacoast is currently housed in two campuses in the Arlington area of Jacksonville, Florida. Its preschool and elementary buildings, located off the Arlington Expressway. The high school building, located off the Arlington Expressway, has a computer lab, dance studio, art room, chapel, science lab, and large classrooms.

== Curriculum ==
The high school curriculum is college preparatory focused; several Advanced Placement courses and a dual enrollment program at the South Campus of Florida State College at Jacksonville (FSCJ) are available to students. Seacoast is also accredited through the Association of Christian Schools International. For the 2024–2025 school year, administration has announced that they will be adopting a STEAM program of education: Science, Technology, Engineering, Arts, and Mathematics.

== Extracurricular activities ==
Student activities include dance, drama and music, that are showcased in a performance during the school year at the FSCJ Wilson Center for the Arts. Seacoast's sports teams, known as the Eagles, compete in baseball, softball, women and men's basketball, and volleyball, in the Florida Christian Athletic League. In 2010, Seacoast Christian Academy's high school formed a football team. Former Jacksonville Jaguars tight end Damon Jones (American football) coached the team. The sports scene declined from 2019 to 2021 as there was not enough interest for some sports. In 2022, after four years, baseball was brought back to the school and Seacoast hosted its first soccer team in September 2021. Volleyball and softball are also sports of interest In winter 2022, the 2021-2022 Seacoast Student Council presented the idea of bringing football back to the school. This is currently an idea at this time.

== Future plans ==
In 2010, Seacoast board of directors announced plans for a major high school campus expansion. Which would include adding a gymnasium, a classroom wing, and softball, baseball, football, and soccer fields. During that same time, the school expects enrollment to rise to around 550 students. Construction has not yet begun. With the development in the surrounding area of the school, it seems that this may not become a reality unless acted upon soon, but available space has decreased dramatically as of March 2022.
