= Palmetto Bay Academy =

Coordinates: 25°36′55.5″N 80°20′45″W

- Palmetto Bay Academy; 16637 S. Dixie Highway; Miami, Florida 33157; United States

Information
- Type: Private alternative school non-traditional school
- Established: 2000
- Director: Margaret Eubanks
- Grades: 6-12
- Enrollment: 42
- Affiliations: The Education Revolution
- Website: www.palmettobayacademy.com

Palmetto Bay Academy is an independent, non-traditional secondary school located in Miami, Florida. It was founded in the year 2000 by Lois Dimos M.Ed who was joined by her husband James, Dimos B.A. a few years later. It has hosted hundreds of students over the years in a small school environment. In 2015 Mrs. Dimos and Mr. Dimos transitioned to an off-campus leadership role and a new director and associate director were hired. Margaret Eubanks, M.E.d, M.L.S., B.C.S.E., was hired as Director and John Eubanks, M.E.d. was hired as Associate Director. In 2020 Margaret Eubanks and John Eubanks became owners of the school.

The school offers college preparatory academic programming in a socially and emotionally supportive setting. Electives, clubs and events make up a large part of the overall curriculum.

In the latter part of 2019 and into 2020 Palmetto Bay Academy transitioned to distance learning, due to its history of supporting on-campus as well as homebound students. The student body returned to fully on-campus as of August 2021, however the school still serves homebound students as well.

Palmetto Bay Academy is fully accredited by AdvancEd/SACS/Congia.

The school enrolls up to 42 students per year on campus and works with students through distance education as well.
