= Davie, Florida =

- Town
- Town of Davie
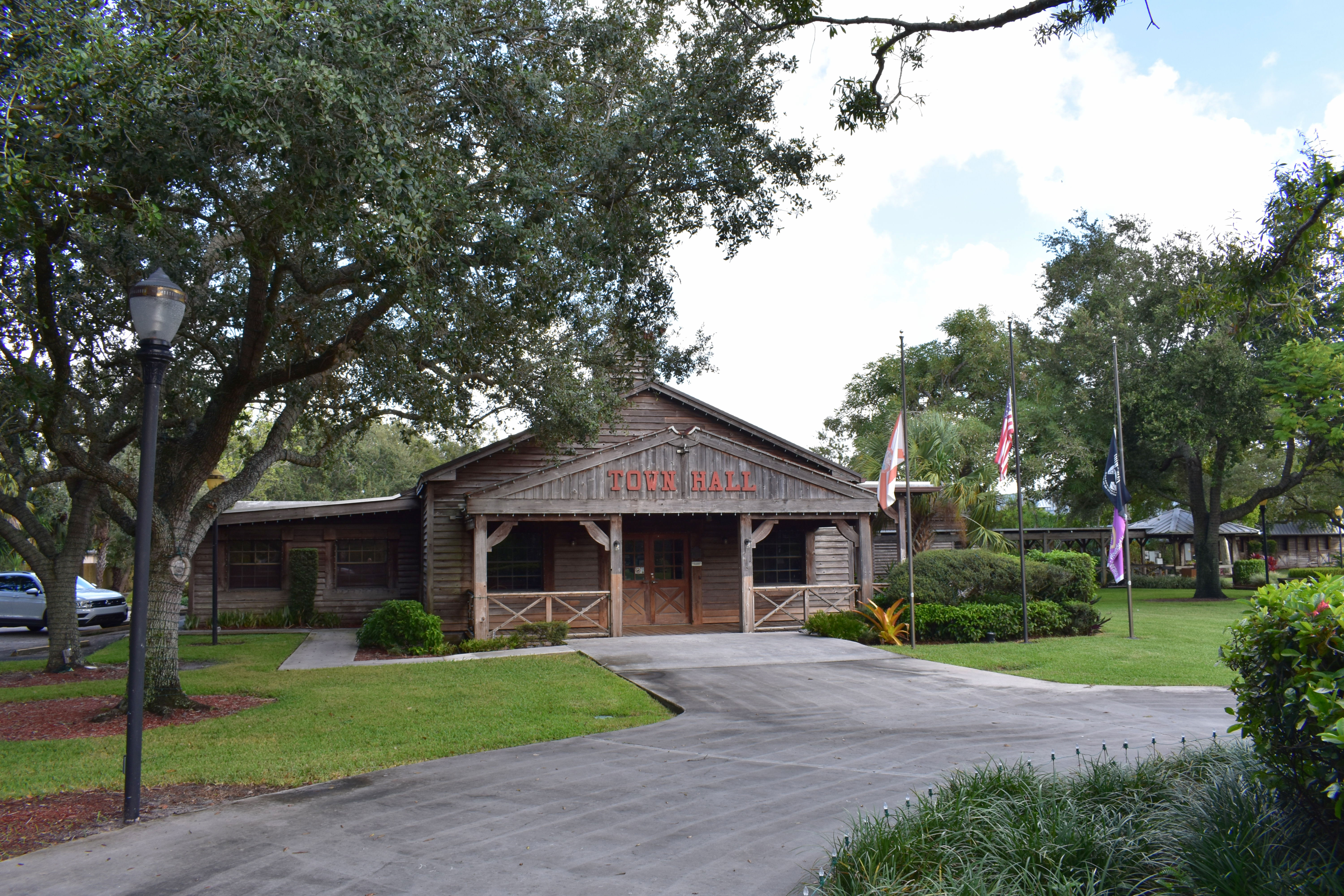
- Town hall

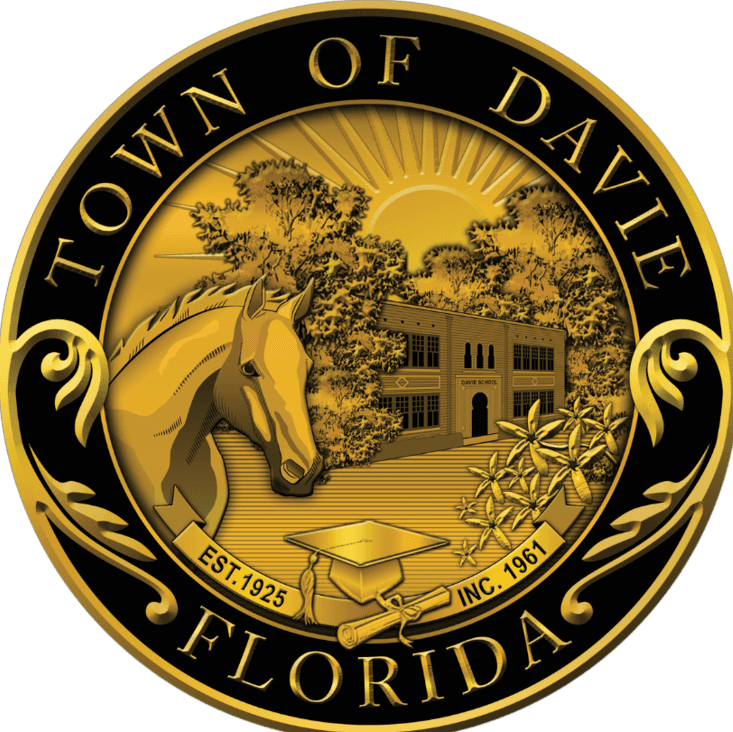
- Seal

- Location of Davie within eastern (incorporated) part of Broward County, Florida

- Davie city map, Florida
- Coordinates: 26°04′28″N 80°15′25″W
- Country: United States
- State: Florida
- County: Broward
- Settled: 1909
- Incorporated (town): November 16, 1925
- Formally Incorporated (town): September 19, 1963
- Named after: Robert Parsell Davie

Government
  - Type: Council-Manager

Area
  - Town: 35.76 sq mi (92.63 km^{2})
  - Land: 34.90 sq mi (90.38 km^{2})
  - Water: 0.87 sq mi (2.26 km^{2}) 2.32%
- Elevation: 7 ft (2.1 m)

Population (2020)
  - Town: 105,691
  - Density: 3,028.9/sq mi (1,169.46/km^{2})
  - Metro: 5,564,635
- Time zone: UTC−5 (EST)
  - Summer (DST): UTC−4 (EDT)
- ZIP Codes: 33312, 33314, 33317, 33324–33326, 33328–33331
- Area codes: 754, 954
- FIPS code: 12-16475
- GNIS feature ID: 2406359
- Website: www.davie-fl.gov

Davie is a town in Broward County, Florida, United States, approximately 24 miles (39 km) north of Miami. The town's population was 110,320 at the 2020 census, making it the largest town in Florida by population. Davie is a principal town of the Miami metropolitan area. Horseback riding is common, as many of its historic buildings include ranches and other Western establishments.

== History ==
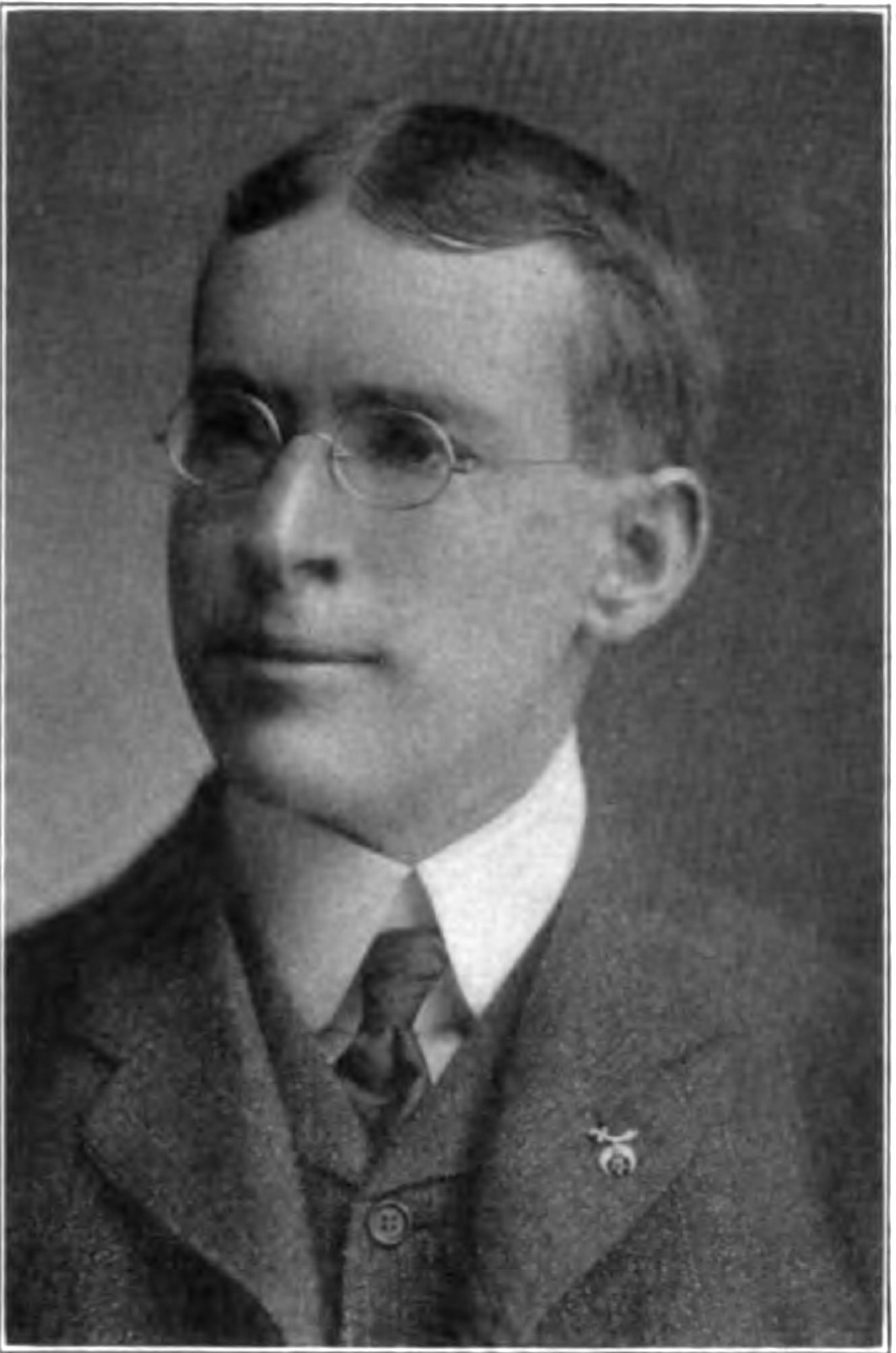
R.P. Davie

Prior to European colonization, the Tequesta were the indigenous people of what is now Davie. A few campsites and graves have been found in Davie, the oldest dating back 5,000 to 7,000 years in Pine Island Ridge. After Spanish colonization, many of the Tequesta died and the remaining few either escaped to Havana with the Spanish when Florida became a British colony, or they assimilated into the newly arrived Seminoles in the late 18th century.

At the turn of the 20th century, when the state of Florida reclaimed 156 square miles (400 km^{2}) of swampland, out-of-state businessman Robert Parsell Davie purchased 44 square miles (110 km^{2}), to develop farms and establish the town of "Zona"; within a few years, the townspeople renamed it "Davie" in his honor.

== Geography ==
According to the United States Census Bureau, the town has a total area of 35.7 square miles (92.5 km^{2}), of which 34.9 square miles (90.4 km^{2}) is land and 0.85 square miles (2.2 km^{2}) (2.32%) is water.

It is where I-595 meets I-75.

=== Climate ===
Davie has a tropical monsoon climate (Am) with hot, humid summers and warm winters.

== Demographics ==
Historical demographics	2020	2010	2000	1990	1980
White (non-Hispanic)	41.7%	56.8%	72.2%	84.5%	93.6%
Hispanic or Latino	39.5%	29.1%	18.8%	10.0%	4.4%
Black or African American (non-Hispanic)	8.2%	7.3%	4.2%	3.7%	1.1%
Asian and Pacific Islander (non-Hispanic)	6.1%	4.5%	2.8%	1.7%	0.9%
Native American (non-Hispanic)	0.2%	0.2%	0.2%	0.2%	0.9%
Some other race (non-Hispanic)	0.8%	0.4%	0.3%	0.1%	0.9%
Two or more races (non-Hispanic)	3.6%	1.7%	1.5%	N/A	N/A
Population	105,691	91,992	75,720	47,217	20,877

=== 2020 census ===
Davie, Florida – Racial and ethnic composition Note: the US Census treats Hispanic/Latino as an ethnic category. This table excludes Latinos from the racial categories and assigns them to a separate category. Hispanics/Latinos may be of any race.
Race / Ethnicity (NH = Non-Hispanic)	Pop 2000	Pop 2010	Pop 2020	% 2000	% 2010	% 2020
White (NH)	54,676	52,212	44,036	72.21%	56.76%	41.66%
Black or African American (NH)	3,207	6,671	8,673	4.24%	7.25%	8.21%
Native American or Alaska Native (NH)	144	223	174	0.19%	0.24%	0.16%
Asian (NH)	2,087	4,135	6,338	2.76%	4.49%	6.00%
Native Hawaiian or Pacific Islander alone (NH)	25	44	65	0.03%	0.05%	0.06%
Other race alone (NH)	206	344	859	0.27%	0.37%	0.81%
Mixed race or Multiracial (NH)	1,105	1,554	3,777	1.46%	1.69%	3.57%
Hispanic or Latino (any race)	14,270	26,809	41,769	18.85%	29.14%	39.52%
Total	75,720	91,992	105,691	100.00	100.00	100.00

As of the 2020 United States census, there were 105,691 people, 35,644 households, and 24,596 families residing in the town.

As of the 2010 United States census, there were 91,922 people, 33,249 households, and 22,313 families residing in the town.

Historical population
Census	Pop.	Note	%±
1970	5,859		—
1980	20,500		249.9%
1990	47,217		130.3%
2000	75,720		60.4%
2010	91,992		21.5%
2020	105,691		14.9%
U.S. Decennial Census

=== 2000 census ===
As of 2000, 36.7% had children under the age of 18 living with them, 51.8% were married couples living together, 12.6% had a female householder with no husband present, and 31.1% were non-families. 22.3% of all households were made up of individuals, and 6.3% had someone living alone who was 65 years of age or older. The average household size was 2.64 and the average family size was 3.13.

In 2000, in the town, the population was spread out, with 26.4% under the age of 18, 8.2% from 18 to 24, 33.4% from 25 to 44, 22.6% from 45 to 64, and 9.4% who were 65 years of age or older. The median age was 36 years. For every 100 females, there were 95.1 males. For every 100 females age 18 and over, there were 91.4 males.

As of 2000, the median income for a household in the town was $47,014, and the median income for a family was $56,290. Males had a median income of $38,756 versus $30,016 for females. The per capita income for the town was $23,271. About 6.9% of families and 9.8% of the population were below the poverty line, including 10.3% of those under age 18 and 7.1% of those age 65 or over.

As of 2000, those who spoke only English at home made up 75.47% of the population, while those who spoke Spanish made up 18.74%, and French speakers made up 1.13% of residents. A few other languages spoken were Italian at 0.73%, Chinese at 0.53%, Portuguese 0.51%, and Haitian Creole being the mother tongue of 0.38% of the population.

== Arts and culture ==
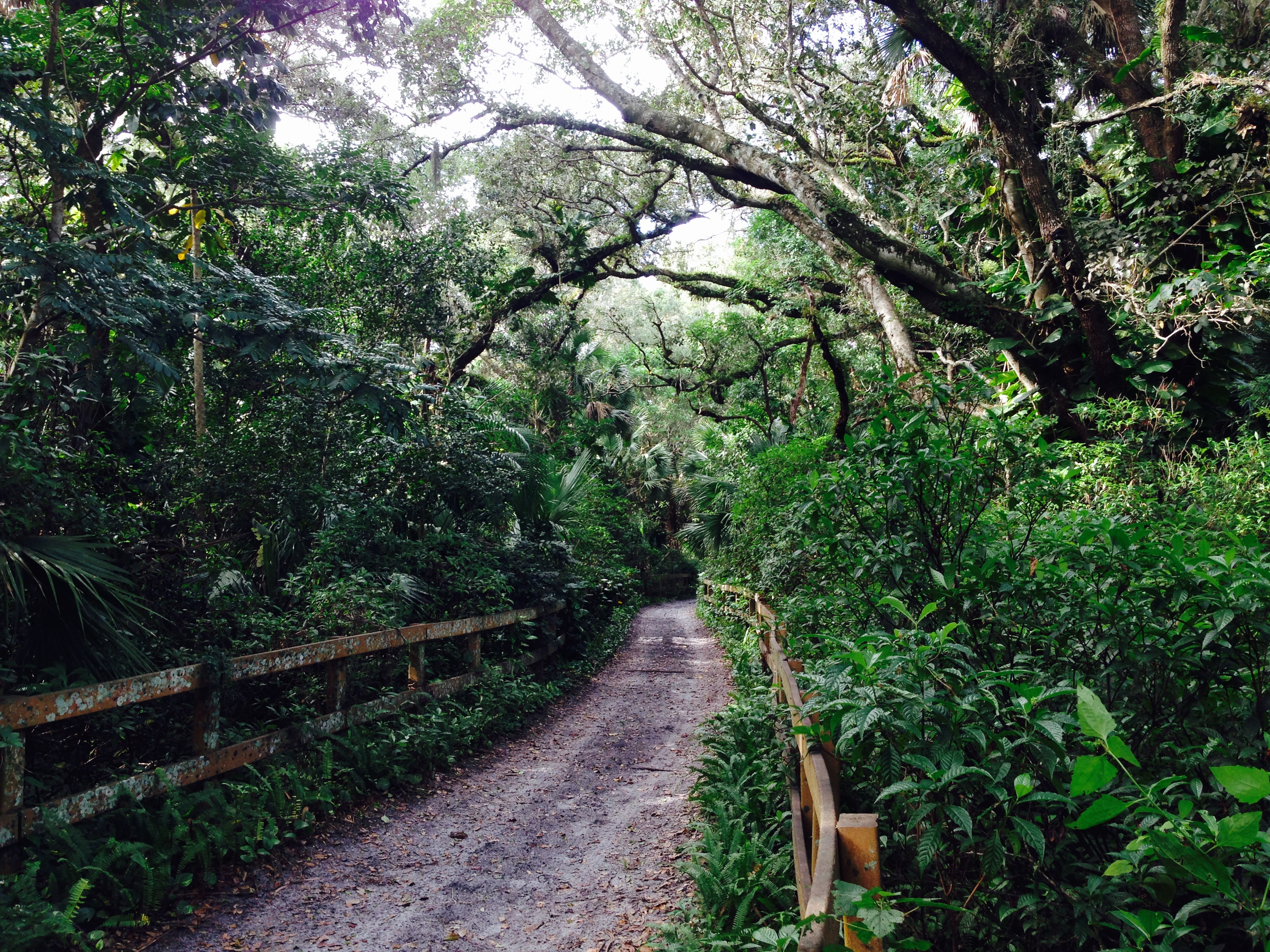
Davie's Long Key Natural Area & Nature Center

Points of interest include:

- Bergeron Rodeo Grounds
- Nova Southeastern University
- Old Davie School
- Flamingo Gardens
- Miami Dolphins Training Facility
- Pine Island Ridge
- Fort Lauderdale Florida Temple

== Education ==
=== Colleges and universities ===
Alvin Sherman Library at Nova Southeastern University

- Nova Southeastern University
- Florida Atlantic University (Davie Campus)
- University of Florida (Davie Campus)
- Broward College (Central Campus)
- McFatter Technical College

=== Public schools ===
Broward County Public Schools operates public schools.

=== Elementary schools ===
- Davie Elementary School
- Flamingo Elementary School
- Fox Trail Elementary School
- Hawkes Bluff Elementary School (opened in 1989)
- Silver Ridge Elementary School
- Nova Dwight D. Eisenhower Elementary School (district-wide magnet)
- Nova Blanche Forman Elementary School (district-wide magnet)

=== Middle schools ===
- Indian Ridge Middle School
- Nova Middle School (magnet)

=== High schools ===
- Western High School
- College Academy @ BC
- McFatter Technical High School – Takes students from southern sections of Broward County
- Nova High School – District-wide

=== Public charter schools ===
- Championship Academy of Distinction at Davie

=== Private schools ===
Catholic schools are under the Roman Catholic Archdiocese of Miami:

- St. David's Catholic Elementary/Middle School
- St. Bonaventure School (Catholic Elementary/Middle)
- St. Bernadette School (in the Davie city limits, has a Hollywood address)

=== Other private schools ===
- The Master's Academy
- Conservatory Prep Senior High School – an arts-integrated school for grades 8–12
- David Posnack Jewish Day School
- University School of Nova Southeastern University

== Media ==
Davie is a part of the Miami-Fort Lauderdale-Hollywood media market, which in 2005 was the twelfth largest radio market and the seventeenth largest television market in the United States.

== Notable people ==
- Abiaka (1781 – 1866) Seminole-Miccosukee chief who fought against the United States during the Seminole Wars
- Richard Bleier (born 1987), Major League Baseball pitcher with the Boston Red Sox
- Nick Castellanos (born 1992), Major League Baseball right fielder for the Philadelphia Phillies
- Jon Feliciano (born 1992), NFL guard for the San Francisco 49ers
- James Fishback (born 1995), CEO of Azoria Partners
- Ernie Francis Jr. (born 1998), racing driver
- Jeronimo Gomez (born 1976), musician, notably of As Friends Rust, The Rocking Horse Winner, and Poison the Well
- Michael Gottlieb (born 1968), member of the Florida House of Representatives
- Leslie Grace (born 1995), singer and actress
- Luis Guillorme (born 1994), Venezuelan-American MLB infielder for the Atlanta Braves
- Randal Hill (born 1969), NFL wide receiver
- Scott Israel (born 1956/57), Police Chief of Opa-locka, former Sheriff of Broward County
- Jacob Jeffries (born 1988), songwriter and pianist
- Mike Lawrence (born 1983), comedian and writer
- Earl Morrall (1934–2014), NFL quarterback
- Scott Storch (born 1973), record producer and songwriter
