= Conservatory Prep Schools =

Location
- 5850 S. Pine Island Road; Davie, Florida 33328
- 26.047396°N 80.258659°W

Information
- School type: Middle and High School
- Religious affiliations: Independent, Non-sectarian
- Opened: 2006
- Founder: Wendy Hirsch Weiner
- Closed: 2021
- Grades: 6 - 12
- Average class size: 4
- Hours in school day: Monday - Thursday 8:20AM - 3:30PM Friday - 8:30AM - 11:30AM
- Accreditation: AdvancED/SACS CASI
- Website: www.conservatoryprep.org

Conservatory Prep Schools was a private, independent, nonsectarian school with grades 7–12 for twice exceptional (2E) student located in Davie, Florida, which was in Broward County, a suburb just west of Fort Lauderdale. The school was small by design with a capacity of 28 students. Conservatory Prep Schools was located inside the David Posnack Jewish Community Center. The school was closed in 2021 due to low enrollment numbers. The school struggled to retain both students and staff. The school made many guarantees it went back on, thus leading to students and teachers often staying for a year or less.
