= McFatter Technical College and Technical High School =

Adult college with a magnet high-school in Davie, Florida

William T. McFatter Technical College and High School

Location
- 6500 Nova Drive; Davie, Florida 33317; United States; 26.08529°N 80.2313°W

Information
- Type: Adult college and magnet high school
- School district: Broward County Public Schools
- Director: Celeste Johnson
- Staff: 43.34 (FTE)
- Grades: 09-12
- Enrollment: 591 (2021–22)
- Student to teacher ratio: 13.96
- Campus type: Suburban
- Colors: ; silver and teal
- Nickname: Storm
- Website: mcfattertechnicalcollege.edu

William T. McFatter Technical College and High School is a public adult technical college that includes a magnet high school. The campus is in Davie, Florida, and is part of the Broward County Public Schools district.

Adult enrollment is approximately 1,000 students. The magnet high school maintains an average of 600 pupils in the school at one time, about 150 students per grade. These students are picked out of a lottery after they have met the requirements to get into the school. Certain requirements include a GPA of at least 2.5, and an FSA and EOC score of a Level 3 or higher.

== History ==
McFatter Technical College and High School originally opened in 1985 as a vocational center for adults, known at the time as William T. McFatter Vocational-Technical Center. The campus is part of the South Florida Education Center in Davie, Florida which consists of Broward College, Florida Atlantic University, Nova Southeastern University, and the University of Florida. In 1998, the campus added a magnet high school which focused on college preparation and technical training. In 2002, William T. McFatter Technical High School was honored as Florida's model high school. It was also named a New Millennium High School, being only one of twenty in the State of Florida. The high school has received an "A" grade from the State of Florida continuously since 2002. In 2009, the high school has recognized as a National Blue Ribbon School of Excellence. The Blue Ribbon Schools Program honors public and private schools based on one of two criteria: 1) schools whose students, regardless of background, achieve in the top 10 percent of their state on state tests—or in the case of private schools, in the top 10 percent of the nation on nationally normed tests—and 2) schools with at least 40 percent of their students from disadvantaged backgrounds that demonstrate dramatic improvement of student performance to high levels on state tests or nationally normed tests. In June 2014, the name of the school changed to William T. McFatter Technical College and High School.

== Operation ==
Adults take either a daily five- or six-hour hands-on technical program which gives them training to enter the workforce. They are taught by professionals in their respective fields. In the high school, for their freshman and second years, students are required to take a "Tech Studies" course, in which they explore the aspects of all the technical programs that the college has to offer. With the end of their second year, students are required to choose their technical program for the rest of their high school years. All students take honor classes or classes on higher levels, and many take Advanced Placement courses. Adult hours range between 07:30 and 14:30, with some evening and/or Saturday classes, as well. The high school operates from 09:15 to 16:10. Students that use school buses as transportation home must take a shuttle bus to Nova High School, where they then get on their respective buses home. There are many clubs and organizations for students to participate.

== High school ==
There is currently one main high school building for academic classes. The campus does not have any sports teams. Physical Education and Health Management classes are required to be taken as a freshman and sophomore. The school symbol is a Storm, represented by a storm design. The first high school class to graduate from McFatter was in 2002.

== Demographics ==
As of the 2021–22 school year, the total student enrollment was 591. The ethnic makeup of the school was 65.3% White, 19.8% Black, 45.9% Hispanic, 9.3% Asian, 4.2% Multiracial, 0.8% Native American or Native Alaskan, and 0.5% Native Hawaiian or Pacific Islander. Note that the adult enrollment in this school is not reflected in the total student enrollment number.
