= Palm Harbor Community School =

School in Florida, United States

Coordinates: 28°5′6.5″N 82°45′47.5″W

Location
- Florida; United States

Palm Harbor Community School is a school in Palm Harbor, Florida, Pinellas County, Florida. It offers programs for adults with disabilities, English for Speakers of Other Languages (ESOL) classes, General Educational Development (GED) classes and Adult Basic Education (ABE) classes, as well as high school credit recovery, lifelong learning programs and vocational classes including sewing and child care. The school is located on the west side of Palm Harbor University High School's campus at 1900 Omaha Street. It opened in 1996.
