= David Posnack Jewish Day School =

Location
- 5810 South Pine Island Road; Davie, Florida 33328; United States
- 26.047996°N 80.259354°W

Information
- School type: Jewish day school
- Religious affiliation: Judaism
- Denomination: All Denominations
- Established: 1974
- CEEB code: 101:532
- Head of school: Dr. Richard Cuenca
- Teaching staff: 111 (FTE) (as of 2017-18)
- Grades: Junior K-12
- Average class size: 15-20
- Student to teacher ratio: 6.2 (as of 2017-18)
- Colours: Blue, White, Gold
- Athletics: FHSAA 1A
- Mascot: Maccabee the Ram
- Team name: RAMS
- Accreditation: National Association of Independent Schools; Association of Independent School of Florida; Cognia; Florida Council of Independent Schools; National Council for Private School Accreditation
- Website: posnackschool.org

David Posnack Jewish Day School (formerly David Posnack Hebrew Day School) is a private Jewish day school located in Davie, Florida.

== History ==
The school was founded in 1974 as an elementary school located in Plantation, Florida. The middle school was added in 1983 and the high school in 1998. In January 2011, the David Posnack Jewish Day School consolidated its lower, middle, and high schools onto one campus in Davie, Florida. Previously, only the lower school was located on the campus, with the middle and high schools located in Plantation, Florida.

For the 2011–2012 school year, the school was renamed from David Posnack Hebrew Day School to David Posnack Jewish Day School (Posnack School, Posnack Jewish Day School).

== Technology ==
=== Lower School ===
The Lower School introduced iPads for grades K-4 and Fujitsu Stylistic Q702 Slate PCs for grade 5 at the start of the 2011 school year. All of the iPads are stored in mobile PC storage units, referred to as C.O.W.s. (Computers on Wheels) 5th Grade students get to use the Slates in school.

=== Upper School ===
The Upper School initiated a Tablet PC program, using the Toshiba Portege M750 Series Tablets beginning in 2009.

For the start of the 2010–2011 school year, new students purchased the Toshiba Portege M780 Series Tablets and for the 2011–2012 school year, new students purchased either the Fujitsu Lifebook T731 or the Fujitsu Lifebook T580. Software used includes DyKnow, and Microsoft Office (including Microsoft OneNote). The school supports Windows XP, Windows 7, and Windows 8 for the Tablets.

=== Posnack Virtual School ===
In 2017, Posnack School launched Posnack Virtual School a real-time online Jewish high school program, offering a full dual-curriculum education to Jewish homeschooling students and students living in areas without a local Jewish high school. Students access live general and Jewish studies classes through a learning management system. Students also have full access to the school's college counseling services. Students who complete the program earn a Posnack High School diploma.

== Administration ==
Head of School	Dr. Richard Cuenca
Chief Financial Officer	Dena Decker
Chief Advancement Officer	Randi Schwartz
Rabbinic Dean	Rabbi Robert Kaplan
Director of Technology	Jeff Shapiro
Director of College Counseling	Aleny Garcia
Director of Athletics	Wayne Stofsky
Director of Performing & Visual Arts	Didi Moses
Fischer High School Principal	Dr. Paul Satty
Hochberg Middle School Principal	Terry Tait
Lower School Principal	Beth Spier
Principal of Hebrew Language	Dr. Dayna Wald

== Curriculum ==
Fischer High School curriculum includes Science, Mathematics, Tanakh, English, Hebrew, Physical Education, Health, World History, and Rabbinics. The School has an outstanding Advanced Placement program in History, Economics, Government, Psychology, Human Geography, Physics, Chemistry, Biology, Calculus, Statistics, English, Music Theory, and Art. Middle School curriculum includes Science, Torah, Mathematics (Including up to two-year ahead Advanced Courses), Hebrew, English, Physical Education, World History, United States History, Jewish Denominations, Jewish History, Israel History and Holocaust Studies.

=== Extracurricular activities ===
Student activities at Posnack School include:

- American Israel Public Affairs Committee
- Art for the Heart
- Business Club
- Chess Club
- Creative Writing Club
- Computer Science Club
- Drama
- Drumline
- English Honors Society
- Film Production Club
- Health, Science, and Medical Club
- Jewish Student Union
- Jewish Identity Club
- Marching Band
- Moot Beit Din
- Model UN Club
- Mu Alpha Theta
- National Arts Honor Society
- National Honor Society
- National Junior Honor Society
- No Place for Hate
- Pep Club
- Programming Club
- Student Government
- Students Against Destructive Decisions
- Technology Internship
- Tefillah
- Thespians
- Yearbook

== Athletics ==
Posnack School has had successful tennis and swimming teams, and has won four all-sports championships since 2005. They were winter soccer state runner up in 2005–2006, beating University school in David Posnack Jewish Day School's first district finals win. First-Ever State Championship playoff berth led by midfielder, Solomon Braun (went to play for Princeton), Abraham Braun, Eitan Siso, Forward Barak Lynn, Oshri Amar, Josif Rotlowitz, Sharon Keidan, Danny marks, Jeremey Klawsky, and goalie Alex Fried (most winning goalie in the school's history record for most shutouts ever recorded.) Former head coach, Mitch Evron held the records for wins at Posnack School. He formerly coached Andy Roddick. Through the 2010–2011 season, the basketball team played in Florida's Class 1A private school division. Since the 2011–2012 season, Posnack competes in the new 2A Urban classification. The Posnack School athletic program received national attention in 2011 when former-NBA player Kenny Anderson was named coach of the High School Boys' Varsity Basketball team. Anderson's signing with Posnack echoed Joe Bryant pursuing his first coaching position at Akiba Hebrew Academy in Lower Merion, Pennsylvania in 1992–1993.

== Notable alumni ==
- Gabe Dunn, writer and blogger
- Jason Drucker, actor
- Michael Reiskind, Lead Strength Coach for Fredericksburg Nationals, low-A for the Washington Nationals.
