= Bell Creek Academy =

Location
- Riverview, Florida, 33569; United States
- 27.8524°N 82.2725°W

Information
- Funding type: Charter
- Established: 2013
- Principal: Anna Montoute
- Grades: 6–12
- Enrollment: 1112; 576 in Middle School; 536 in High School
- Colors: White and Teal (Middle School); Black and Grey (High School)
- Mascot: Panther
- Rivals: Canterbury, Winthrop College Prep
- Website: bellcreekacademy.com

Bell Creek Academy is a U.S. middle and high school in Riverview, Florida. The Panther is the school mascot. In May 2013, construction of the middle school and high school campus on Boyette Road began for the school to open for the 2013 – 2014 school year. Bell Creek is managed by Charter School Associates, a management company that runs more than 20 schools in the state of Florida.

== Student government ==
The Bell Creek Academy Student Government Association (SGA) is the high school representative of the students. It was established in 2015. Its positions are given below:

- President
- Vice President
- Vice President of Marketing
- Vice President of Finance
- Secretary
- Student Life Committee (composed of Class Presidents and Class Vice Presidents)

== Sports ==
Bell Creek Academy has both boys' and girls' sports, including:

=== Middle school boys ===
- Baseball
- Junior varsity basketball
- Varsity basketball

=== Middle school co-ed ===
- Volleyball
- Soccer
- Track and field
- Cross country
- Flag football
- Street hockey

=== High school boys ===
- Basketball
- Soccer
- Baseball

=== High school girls ===
- Soccer
- Basketball
- Flag football
- Volleyball

=== High school co-ed ===
- JV football
- Varsity football
- Track and field
- Cross country
- Bowling
- Wrestling

=== Notable accomplishments ===
- BODYARMOR 8-Man Series / Class A State Champions
- On September 24, 2021, Abby Dicenzo became the first woman to score a rushing touchdown in a varsity football game in Florida history.
