= Carrollwood Day School =

Private school in Tampa, Florida, US

Location
- 12606 Casey Road (Early Childhood Center) 1515 West Bearss Avenue (Main Campus); Tampa, Florida 33613; United States

Information
- School type: Private
- Motto: “Education with Character”
- Established: 1982
- Principal: Dawn Wilson (Lower School)
- Principal: Lindsay Bowman (Middle School)
- Principal: Stephen Higgins (Upper School)
- Head of school: Sara Rubinstein
- Faculty: 235
- Grades: Toddler - 12th Grade
- Gender: Co-Ed
- Enrollment: 1270 (2025)
- Student to teacher ratio: ECC 7:1, Elementary 10:1, Middle 8:1, High 9:1
- Education system: IB
- Language: English, Spanish, French
- Colors: Red, Grey, White, and Black
- Mascot: Riot the Eagle
- Nickname: CDS
- Team name: Patriots
- Annual tuition: $20,050 (Preschool) $21,135 (Kindergarten) $25,370 (Grades 1–5) $29,005 (Grades 6–8) $32,455 (Grades 9–12)
- Website: www.cdspatriots.org

Carrollwood Day School is a non-sectarian, co-educational, private school for students, from age two through high school in Tampa, Florida.

Its curriculum follows the guidelines established by the International Baccalaureate Organization. Carrollwood was the sixth school in the US authorized to offer all three levels of the IB program.

== History ==
The school was established in 1982.

== Notable alumni ==
- Charlie White (2012), YouTuber and streamer
- Michael Trigg (2021), NFL tight end
- Brandon Cleveland (2022), NFL defensive tackle
