= Spoto High School =

Location
- 8538 Eagle Palm Drive; Riverview, Florida 33569; United States
- 27°53′04″N 82°21′08″W

Information
- Type: Public high school
- Established: 2006
- School district: Hillsborough County Public Schools
- Principal: Candace Culpepper
- Staff: 93
- Grades: 9–12
- Enrollment: 1,679 (2018–19)
- Student to teacher ratio: 17.96
- Colors: Purple, black and grey
- Mascot: Spartan
- Accreditation: Florida State Department of Education
- Feeder schools: Giunta Middle School Dowdell Middle Magnet School Eisenhower Middle School
- Website: www.hillsboroughschools.org/o/spoto

Spoto High School is a public high school located in Riverview, Florida, United States, serving the communities of Progress Village and Palm River-Clair Mel. It operates as a part of the Hillsborough County Public Schools system. It opened in August 2006, with the main purpose of relieving overcrowding at Riverview High School (Riverview, Florida) and East Bay High School in nearby Gibsonton. It also pulled students from Brandon High School and Bloomingdale High School. The school population for 2008–2009 was 1,460 students.

== History ==
=== Founding ===
Spoto High School was founded in honor of Richard C. Spoto, a Tampa native who had dedicated 41 years to local education and athletics in Hillsborough County. After attending the University of Tampa on a football scholarship and also serving in the U.S. Army Air Corps during World War II, Spoto became the Hillsborough County Public School System's first director of health and physical education. Within the county, he also served as the principal for several area schools, most notably Hillsborough High School and Saint Mary's Episcopal Day School. Spoto would appear often at the high school for events, until he died on January 31, 2010.

The school was built to accommodate the rapidly growing population within the Southern Hillsborough County area. Early structural engineering and design oversight had involved multiple regional engineering firms, including principal in-charge work by TRC Worldwide Engineering, Inc.

When Spoto High School opened its doors for the 2006–2007 academic year, its first principal was Clyde Trathowen, who would guide the school through its foundation years and establish its first athletic and academic programs.

=== School expansion ===
In the early 2020s, Spoto High School began a significant campus expansion in order to address rapid population and enrollment growth in the Riverview area. Planning for the project was formalized within Hillsborough County Public Schools' five-year work plan by September 2020, as the district aimed to mitigate a regional "school capacity crisis". The project was officially adopted into the 2021-2022 Five Year Facilities Work Plan by the HCPS School Board on October 5, 2021.

Construction of the $16 million classroom addition, which was designed by Long & Associates and managed by Ajax Building Company, began in December 2021. The project involved the construction of a 33,000-square-foot, two-story building on a portion of the pre-existing student parking lot, necessitating early infrastructure and utility relocation for the build.

The expansion was completed on May 28, 2023, which provided approximately 500 new student stations. The new wing also features modern biology and chemistry labs, a culinary arts teaching kitchen, and a second-story pedestrian bridge connecting it to the original classroom buildings (specifically the "300" building). The exterior of the building is distinguished by a backlit Spartan logo with color-changing LED lighting. The building opened for student use at the beginning of the 2023–2024 school year.

In late 2024, the school further expanded student services by opening the Student Center of Postsecondary Exploration (SCOPE). This was funded through a partnership with the Hillsborough Education Foundation, The Mosaic Company, and TECO. The center provides a dedicated space for students to consult with counselors on college and career transition planning.

== Academics ==
=== School grade ===
The Florida Department of Education appraises schools on an annual bases and assigns each a letter grade based on their academic achievement, graduation rates, and other metrics. Between the school years of 2020-2021 and 2022-2023, Spoto High School received a 'C' grade. The school's grade has since improved to a 'B' for 2023-2024 and 2024-2025.

Florida Department of Education grade
School year	Grade
2020–2021	C
2021–2022	C
2022–2023	C
2023–2024	B
2024–2025	B

=== Dual enrollment and Collegiate Academy ===
Spoto High School gives students the opportunity to earn college credit via dual enrollment in partnership with Hillsborough College (HC). Students must apply in their 8th grade year and have an unweighted GPA of 3.0 or higher to enroll in dual enrollment, with an additional requirement being that they take and pass Algebra 1 or Algebra 1 Honors. Through the school's Collegiate Academy program, students can take college courses directly on the high school's campus, with the additional option to take them online directly through HC. The program allows students to earn up to 60 college credit hours, providing a full Associate in Arts (AA) pathway for those who are looking to earn their degree alongside their high school diploma. Courses completed at HC are used to satisfy both state high school graduation requirements and college credit. In alignment with the Hillsborough County Public Schools policy, dual enrollment courses receive the same weighting towards students' GPA as Advanced Placement (AP) and International Baccalaureate (IB) courses, though Spoto High School does not currently offer IB courses on its campus.

=== Virtual School ===
Spoto High School allows students to concurrently enroll part-time in Hillsborough Virtual School (HVS), a Florida Virtual School (FLVS) franchise. HVS offers a majority of FLVS courses, allowing students to take AP and Honors courses that are not offered on campus. Students can also use HVS for credit recovery in classes needed for graduation, such as Algebra 1 and Geometry. Spoto High School allows students to opt for a "Virtual School on Campus" period to have dedicated time to complete these courses during the school day, usually in place of an elective course.

== Demographics ==
Spoto High ethnic enrollment
Race	2014-2015		2022-2023	
Black (NH)	542	37.77%	696	39.66%
Hispanic or Latino	513	35.75%	665	37.89%
White (NH)	256	17.84%	260	14.81%
Mixed/multi-racial (NH)	77	5.37%	94	5.36%
Asian (NH)	43	3.00%	38	2.17%
Native American (NH)	4	0.28%	2	0.11%
Total	1,435	100.00%	1,755	100.00%

== Notable alumni ==
- Geronimo Allison, football wide receiver
