= Cambridge Christian School (Florida) =

Coordinates: 28.0021°N 82.4877°W

- Tampa, Florida; United States

Information
- Type: Private
- Motto: Pro Rege (For the King)
- Religious affiliations: Christian (non-denominational)
- Established: 1964
- Headmaster: Shawn Minks
- Faculty: 70
- Enrollment: 651
- Campus: Suburban
- Colors: Navy and Gold
- Athletics: 12 interscholastic sports
- Mascot: Lancer
- Website: www.ccslancers.com

Cambridge Christian School (CCS) is a co-educational, private, non-denominational Christian school serving grades PreK–12, located in Tampa, Florida, United States. CCS is a college preparatory school accredited by Christian Schools of Florida.

== History ==
Cambridge Christian School was established as Seminole Presbyterian School in 1964. The school was started and sponsored by the Seminole Presbyterian Church, now Christ Central Presbyterian Church. By the end of the 1990s, the growing needs of the school necessitated its formal separation from the church.

In 2000, the school became its own legal entity and changed its name to the Cambridge School. The church and school would continue to share the Habana Avenue campus for the next few years as the school decided whether to move to a different location.

In 2003, the board of trustees voted to change the name of the school to Cambridge Christian School, decided that it would remain on the Habana campus, began the process of purchasing the campus from Seminole Presbyterian Church, and began to acquire adjacent land for future expansion. The name change became effective in July 2007.

Since August 2020 CCS has offered in-person classes for students who meet COVID-19 screening protocols.

== Curriculum ==
CCS offers three tracks for high school students: college prep and honors tracks, as well as digital, science, and engineering STEM programs.

=== Co-curricular activities ===
In addition to athletic opportunities, CCS has offered students service and cultural opportunities.

== Sexual Ethics Policy ==
Cambridge Christian School states in its 2025–2026 Upper School Parent–Student Handbook that its policies are guided by its interpretation of the Bible.

According to the handbook, the school affirms that humans are created in the image of God and that gender and sexuality are gifts from God. It defines marriage as a permanent, exclusive union between one "biological man" and one "biological woman" and states that sexual conduct is permitted only within that context.

The policy states that sexual behavior outside of such a marriage is considered inconsistent with the school’s beliefs. Examples listed include same-sex sexual relationships, sex before marriage, adultery, pornography, bestiality, and incest.

The handbook further provides that students, employees, board members, and volunteers with student interaction are expected to abide by this policy. It specifies that compliance includes refraining from involvement in advocacy groups whose positions conflict with the policy, and that alleged violations are addressed under standard disciplinary procedures.

The document also states that individuals are expected to treat others with compassion, dignity, and respect, including those whose beliefs or conduct differ from the school’s stated position. It concludes by affirming a belief in redemption and forgiveness through Jesus Christ.

The Sexual Ethics Policy spans multiple pages and is among the lengthier policy sections in the 2025–2026 Upper School Parent–Student Handbook.

=== 2019–2020 Handbook provisions ===
The 2019–2020 Cambridge Christian School Parent–Student Handbook included language indicating that individuals found not observing the stated biblical standards of purity would be offered “counsel and assistance” and that the school could take actions “up to and including dismissal” for conduct deemed to be damaging to or a distraction from the school’s mission.
