= Seffner Christian Academy =

School in Florida, United States

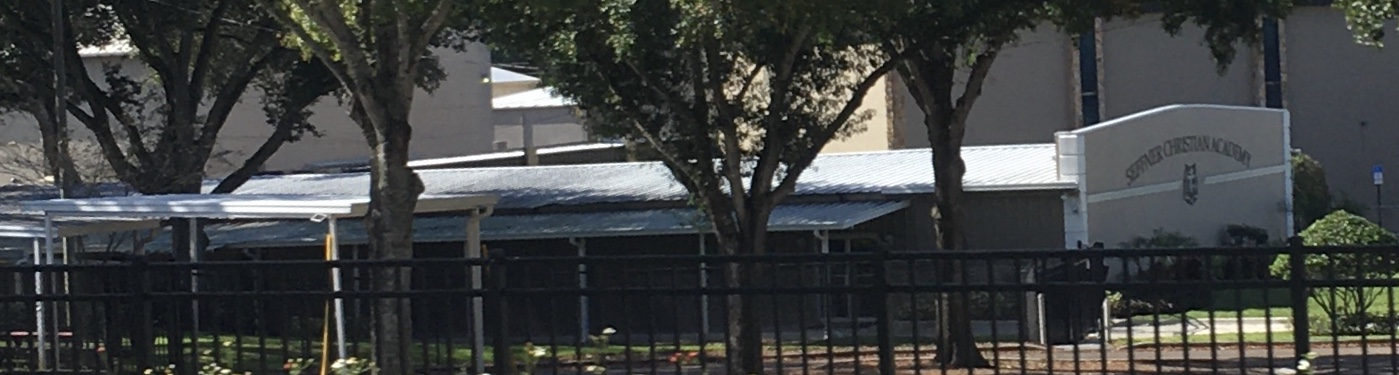

Location
- 11605 US Hwy 92 E Seffner, (Hillsborough County), Florida; United States; 28°00′02″N 82°18′17″W

Information
- Type: Private School, high school
- Established: 1983
- Principal: Rodney Knox
- Grades: K–12
- Enrollment: 810 (2024)
- Colors: Burgundy and White
- Team name: Crusaders
- Rivals: Bayshore
- Accreditation: Southern Association of Colleges and Schools. Association of Christian Schools International (ACSI)
- Website: www.scacrusaders.com

Seffner Christian Academy is a private Christian school located in Seffner, Florida, United States. It was established in 1983. Seffner Christian enrolls over 800 students. In 2013, the Tampa Bay Business Journal listed SCA as Tampa's 21st most expensive private school, out of 23 rated.

== Arts ==
Fine arts programs include band, choir, and drama.

== Athletics ==
The school's athletic teams are referred to as the Crusaders.

Seffner Christian Academy has participated in the FHSAA since 2005 and has appeared in 32 district finals and six regional finals as of 2012. Football was introduced to SCA in 2010, and in 2012 an SCA student was awarded the first football scholarship ever awarded by Olivet Nazarene University. For many years, the school has hosted the Jan Bennett basketball tournament, which raises funds to pay for Hillsborough County basketball all-star recognition and events.

The school fields teams in the following sports:

- Basketball
- Football
- Soccer
- Volleyball
- Baseball
- Softball
- Cheerleading
- Cross country
- Track & field
- Beach volleyball

== Demographics ==
The student body is evenly divided between male and female students. Approximately 55% are white, 22% Hispanic, 19% black and 4% Asian.

The school has special programs to help working mothers.
