= List of virtual schools =

Following is a list of virtual schools—coursework from an accredited private school or accredited not-for-profit or publicly funded institution, taught primarily through online methods. Schools are listed by country and by state or province. Within each geographic division, primary and secondary schools are listed first; colleges and universities are listed second.

Any of the thousands of commercial or unaccredited ventures that offer online courses should be listed elsewhere, under their relevant categories.

== Australia ==
- School of the Air
- School of Isolated and Distance Education

== Canada ==
=== Alberta ===
- Athabasca University

=== British Columbia ===
- Virtual School BC

=== Ontario ===
==== Public ====
- Independent Learning Centre distance education high school credit courses
- Peel District School Board continuing education online
- Toronto District School Board virtual school
- York Region District School Board continuing education e-learning, also known as night high school (uses D2L)

==== Private ====
- Ontario Virtual School (OVS)
- Virtual High School

== United States ==
Many of the schools listed below serve students nationally and internationally.

=== Arizona ===
- ASU Prep Digital
- Northcentral University
- Primavera Online High School

=== California ===
- Apex Learning Virtual School
- Capistrano Connections Academy
- East Bay Innovation Academy
- Stanford University Online High School
- Laurel Springs School
- University of the People
- International Virtual Learning Academy

=== Florida ===
- Florida Virtual School
- Pasco eSchool

=== Illinois ===
- American School of Correspondence
- Illinois Virtual Schools & Academy

=== Maryland ===
- National Connections Academy

=== Michigan ===
- Cornerstone University

=== Minnesota ===
- T4N Pinnacle Academy

=== Mississippi ===
- University of Mississippi High School - Accredited by AdvancED and NCAA Core Course Approved

=== Nebraska ===
- University of Nebraska High School

=== New Hampshire ===
- Virtual Learning Academy Charter School

=== New York ===
- Dwight Global Online School

=== North Carolina ===
- Guilford eLearning University Prep

=== Ohio ===
- Franklin University
- Apex Learning

=== Pennsylvania ===
There were 14 public cyber charter schools operating in Pennsylvania in 2013.

- Keystone National High School
- Penn Foster High School
- Pennsylvania Cyber Charter School
- Pennsylvania Leadership Charter School
- Pennsylvania Virtual Charter School
- SusQ Cyber Charter School
- Commonwealth Charter Academy

=== South Carolina ===
- Provost Academy South Carolina
- SC Whitmore School

=== Utah ===
- Western Governors University

=== Virginia ===
- University of Fairfax

=== West Virginia ===
- CompuHigh/Whitmore School

=== Wisconsin ===
- Wisconsin Virtual Academy

== Other ==
- International Schooling, serves globally.
- K8 School, serves globally.
- 21K School World Campus, serves globally.
- The Pearl: Remote Democratic High School, serves globally.
- CambriLearn, a global online school founded in South Africa serving students in over 100 countries.
- K12 Private Academy, a global online K‑12 education provider.
- Liberty University Online Academy, a large online school serving students worldwide.
- Global Online Academy, a nonprofit online education consortium offering classes to students internationally.
- Minerva Virtual Academy, a UK‑based online secondary school serving learners internationally.
- Crimson Global Academy, with three campuses each with their own curriculums and time zones.
- Teneo International School, a UK-based online British school delivering Pearson Edexcel International GCSEs and A Levels to learners globally.
- Britannia International Academy - online school registered in the UK serves students globally, follows the British Curriculum and offers OFQUAL regulated courses and certificates as an accredited center of NCC Education UK
