= Angeline Academy of Innovation =

STEAM 6-12 school in Land O' Lakes, Florida

- Facing east, September 21, 2026

Location
- 8916 Angeline School Way; Land O' Lakes, Pasco County, Florida 34638; 28°17′13″N 82°32′13″W

Information
- Established: August 10, 2023; 3 years ago
- School district: Pasco County
- School number: 0153
- Principal: JoAnne Glenn
- Grades: 6-12
- Enrollment: 1,088 (2024-2025)
- Student to teacher ratio: 21.4:1
- Hours in school day: 8:20 AM - 2:40 PM
- Colors: Green and Navy Blue
- Athletics: Volleyball, Cross Country, Golf, Swim & Drive, Soccer, Basketball, Competitive Cheer, Weightlifting, Wrestling, Track & Field, Lacrosse, Flag Football, Tennis
- Mascot: Archer
- Nickname: Angeline
- Newspaper: The Bowman's Beacon
- Website: https://aai.pasco.k12.fl.us/
- Last updated: 2025-08-06

Angeline Academy of Innovation (AAI), also known as Angeline Academy, or Angeline, is a seven-year, 6-12 STEM school located in Land O' Lakes, Florida. It is part of the Pasco County School District. The school day is from 8:20 AM to 2:40 PM. The student/teacher ratio of the school is 21:1.

== Campus ==
Angeline Academy is located on a 19 acre campus next to Florida State Road 589. The school has a footprint of 187,000 square feet with a maximum student capacity of 1,694. The campus is shared with Pasco eSchool, the county's Florida Virtual School franchise.

=== Athletics facility ===
Angeline Academy's sports complex, called the Angeline Athletic Complex, is located off-campus and opened in November 2024 for its first games. It includes a football stadium with a press box, Pasco County’s first artificial turf field, tennis courts, a running track, and a 28,145 square foot gymnasium.

== History ==
Construction of the school's building began in 2022 by Ajax Building and PBK Architects, and was designed by Harvard Jolly Architecture. The construction finished in August 2023, costing $52.7 million.

The school held its first classes on August 10, 2023. The 2023-24 school year opened with 830 students enrolled from grades 6-10, adding grades 11 and 12 the two following years.

== Achievements ==
=== School achievements ===
In the 2023–24 and 2024-25 school year, Angeline has been graded 'A' from the Florida Department of Education, determined by factors such as student scores in Mathematics and English Language Arts.

In the 2023-24 and 2024-25 school year, Angeline Academy outperformed Pasco County and Florida for the pass rates of Algebra 1, Biology, Geometry, and United States History.

== Course pathways ==
Angeline Academy is the Central Pathway School of Pasco County for high-school. Students are required to take one primary pathway, with secondary pathways being optional. Pathways offered are Cybersecurity, Bio Design, Engineering & Robotics, Entrepreneurship, and Artificial Intelligence

== Principals ==
As of 2026, Angeline is currently headed by JoAnne Glenn who has been principal since it opened in 2023. Angeline also has many vice and assistant principals. JoAnne Glenn was the principal of Pasco eSchool before 2023.

== See also ==
- Education in the United States
- Education in Florida
- List of school districts in Florida
