= School library =

Library within a school

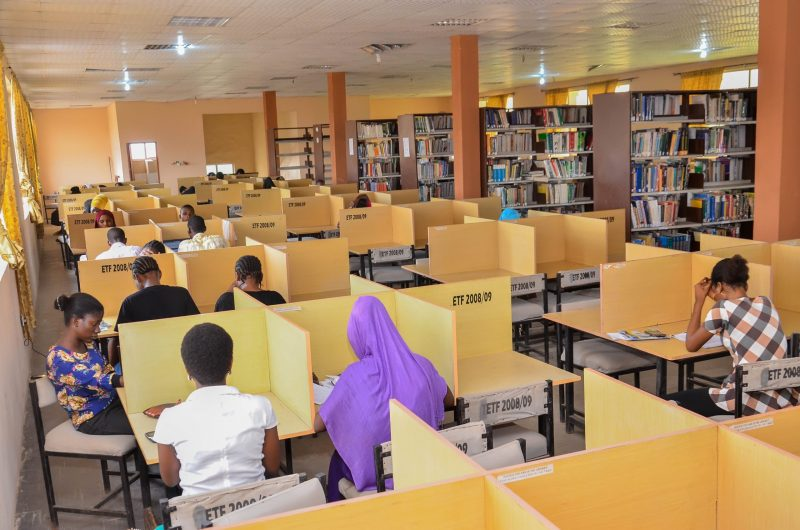
Students in the Tai Solarin University of Education library, Nigeria

A school library, or school media center, is a library within a school where students, staff, and sometimes parents can borrow a variety of print and digital resources. The goal of a school library or media center is to ensure that all members of the school community have equitable access to materials for information gathering.

School libraries are distinct from public libraries because they serve the school's curriculum and are centered around providing school-related materials.

== History ==
Library services for schools started in the 1800s, often in the form of public or state library book wagons. To promote libraries and library education, the American Library Association (ALA) was created in 1876 by a group of librarians led by Melvil Dewey. In the early stages of development, school libraries were primarily made up of small collections, with the school librarian primarily serving a clerical role.

In 1920, library and education communities began publishing the Certain Report, which featured the first broad evaluation of school libraries. By the mid-1940s, 40% of schools indicated the presence of classroom collections. Around 18% of public schools reported having centralized libraries Schools in cities reported 48%, and rural schools reported 12%.

Following the passage of the National Defense Education Act in 1958, funding and development for U.S. libraries increased throughout the 1960s. During this time, the Knapp School Libraries Project established model school library media centers across the country, and hundreds of new school libraries were expanded and renovated.

In recent history, school libraries have been defined by two major guiding documents; Information Power (1988) and Information Power II (1998).

In 1999, the International Federation of Library Associations and Institutions published the UNESCO School library Manifesto, which states: "The school library provides information and ideas that are fundamental to functioning successfully in today's information and knowledge-based society. The school library equips students with life-long learning skills and develops the imagination, enabling them to live as responsible citizens" (para. 1).

== Functions ==
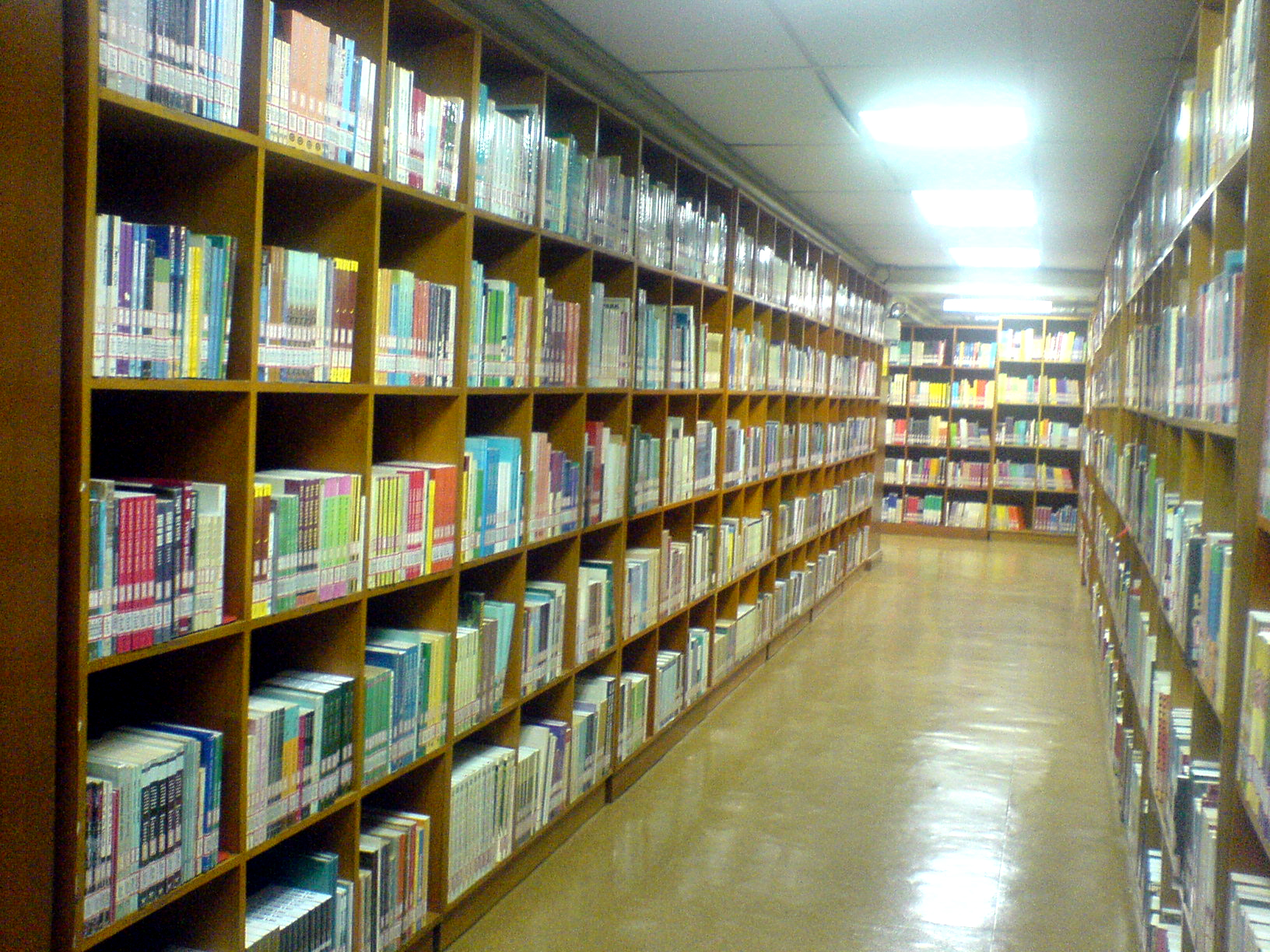
Inside a school library.

School library media centers in the 21st century can, and should be, hubs for increased student achievement and positive focused school reform.
—Kathleen D. Smith

The school library media center program involves the collaboration of school library media specialists, teachers, and administrators to provide opportunities for the social, cultural, and educational growth of students. The school library provides a range of learning opportunities for both large and small groups as well as individuals, with a focus on intellectual content, information literacy, and the learner. School libraries are similar to public libraries in that they contain books, films, recorded sound, periodicals, realia, and digital media. These items are not only for the education, enjoyment, and entertainment of all members of the school community but also to enhance and expand the school's curriculum.

School libraries host special events such as author visits and book clubs and provide space for tutoring and testing. Activities that are part of the school library media program can take place in the school library media center, in the classroom, through the school, and via the school library's online resources. In addition to classroom visits with collaborating teachers, the school library serves as a learning space for students to do independent work and use equipment and research materials.

A school library is also a resource center for students to safely access the internet for schoolwork and social interaction. In her 2010 article "'Tag! You're It!': Playing on the Digital Playground", Dianne de Las Casas discussed how today's youth is much more comfortable with technology than ever before and believed that "We need to advocate for regulations and laws that support education of young people rather than simply limiting their access to the Web."

Across more than 60 studies conducted in the U.S. and Canada, researchers have demonstrated the positive impact that school libraries have on student achievement. Researchers found that students with access to a well-supported school library media program with a qualified school library media specialist scored higher on reading assessments, regardless of their socioeconomic status. In addition, a 2004 study conducted in Ohio found that 99.4% of students surveyed believed that their school librarians and school library media programs helped them succeed in school. Similar conclusions were compiled in a 2003 report by Michele Lonsdale in Australia.

In Australia, school libraries have played a major role in the success of Reading Challenge programs initiated and funded by various State Governments. The Premier's Reading Challenge in South Australia, launched in 2003 by Premier Mike Rann (2002–11), has one of the highest participation rates in the world for reading challenges. It has been embraced by more than 95% of public, private, and religious schools.

== Staffing ==
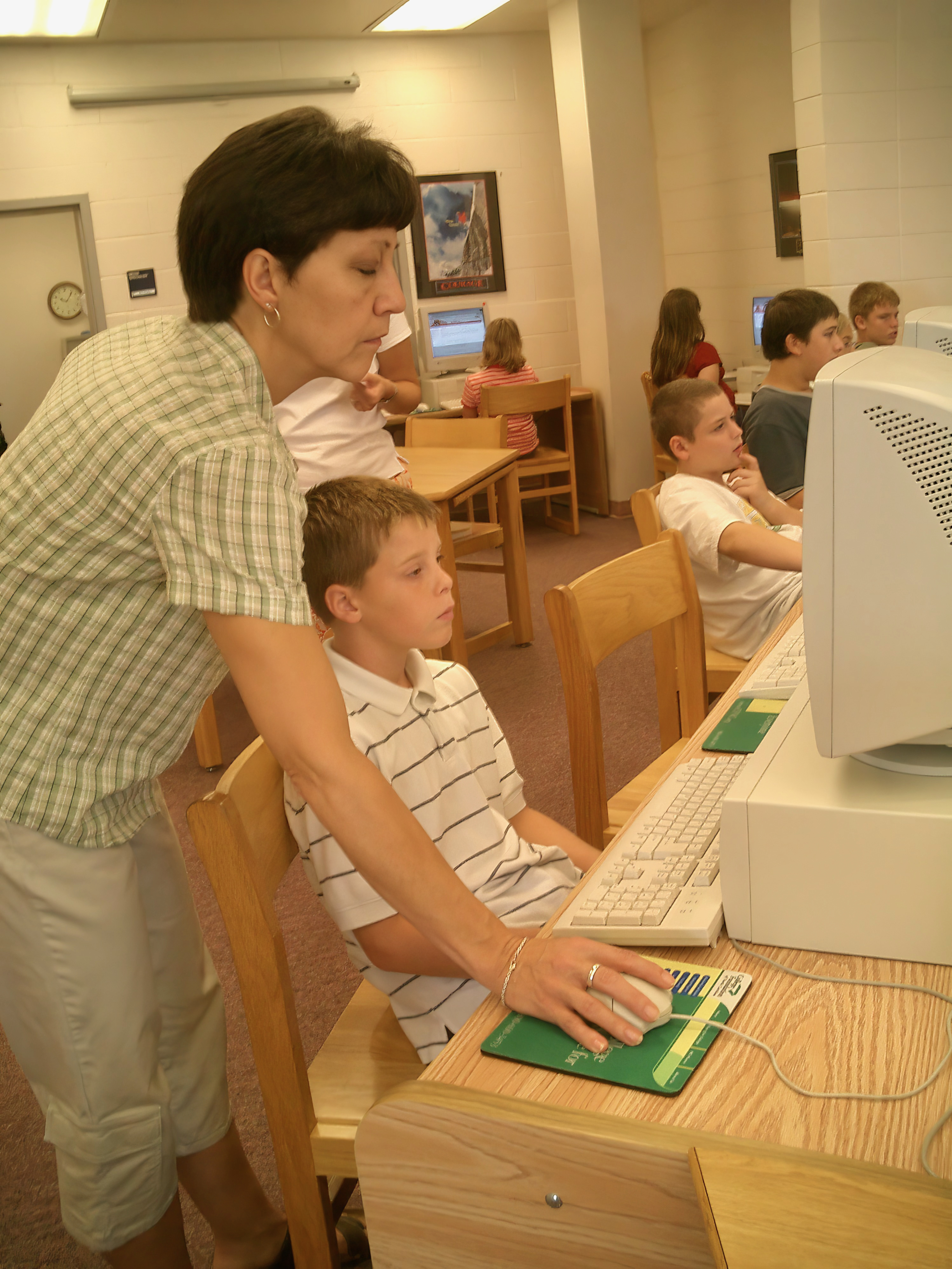
A public middle school librarian helps a student use a computer in a school media center in North Carolina

In many schools, libraries are staffed by librarians, teacher-librarians, student volunteers, or school library media specialists or media coordinators who hold a specific library science degree. In some jurisdictions, school librarians are required to have specific certification and/or a teaching certificate.

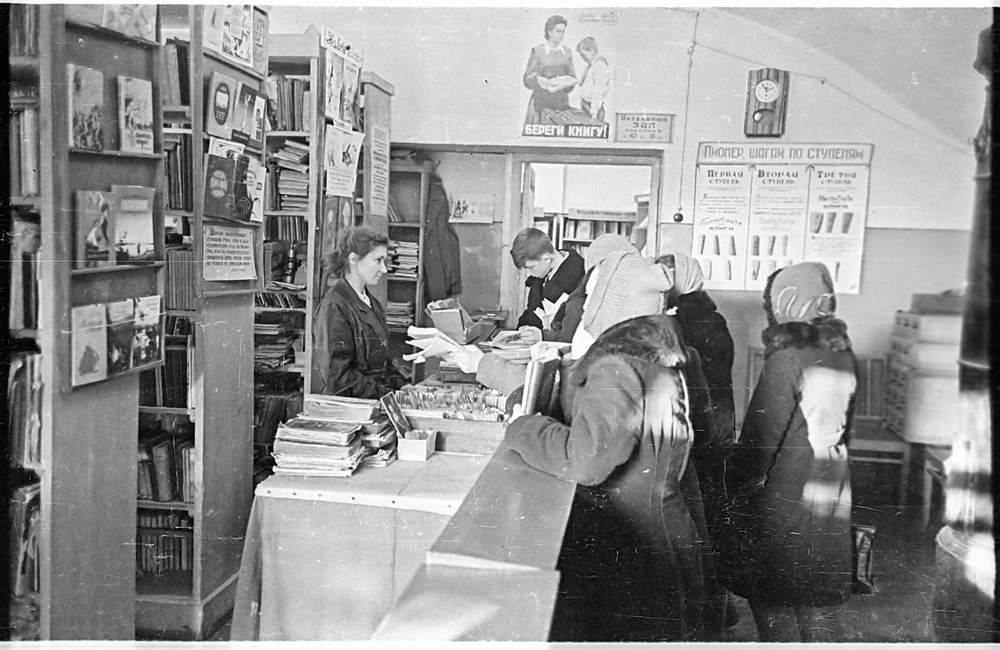
The school librarian supplies children with educational books (Russia, 1959)

School librarians collaborate with classroom teachers to create independent learners by fostering students' research, information literacy, technology, and critical thinking skills. School librarians may read to children, assist them in selecting books, and assist with schoolwork. Many school librarians also teach technology skills, such as keyboarding and Microsoft and Google applications. Some school librarians see classes on a flexible schedule, which allows classroom teachers to schedule library time as needed for the classroom learning experience.

School librarians integrate resources in a variety of formats: periodical databases, websites, digital video segments, podcasts, blog and wiki content, digital images, and virtual classrooms. School librarians are often responsible for audio-visual equipment and are sometimes in charge of school computers and computer networks.

Using the curriculum and student interests, school librarians identify and obtain library materials that promote independent reading and lifelong learning. Materials in the library collection can be located using an Online Public Access Catalog (OPAC). These catalogs are often web-based, allowing student access both at school and from home.

Many school librarians also perform clerical duties, such as circulating and cataloging materials, facilitating interlibrary loans, shelving materials, and performing inventory.

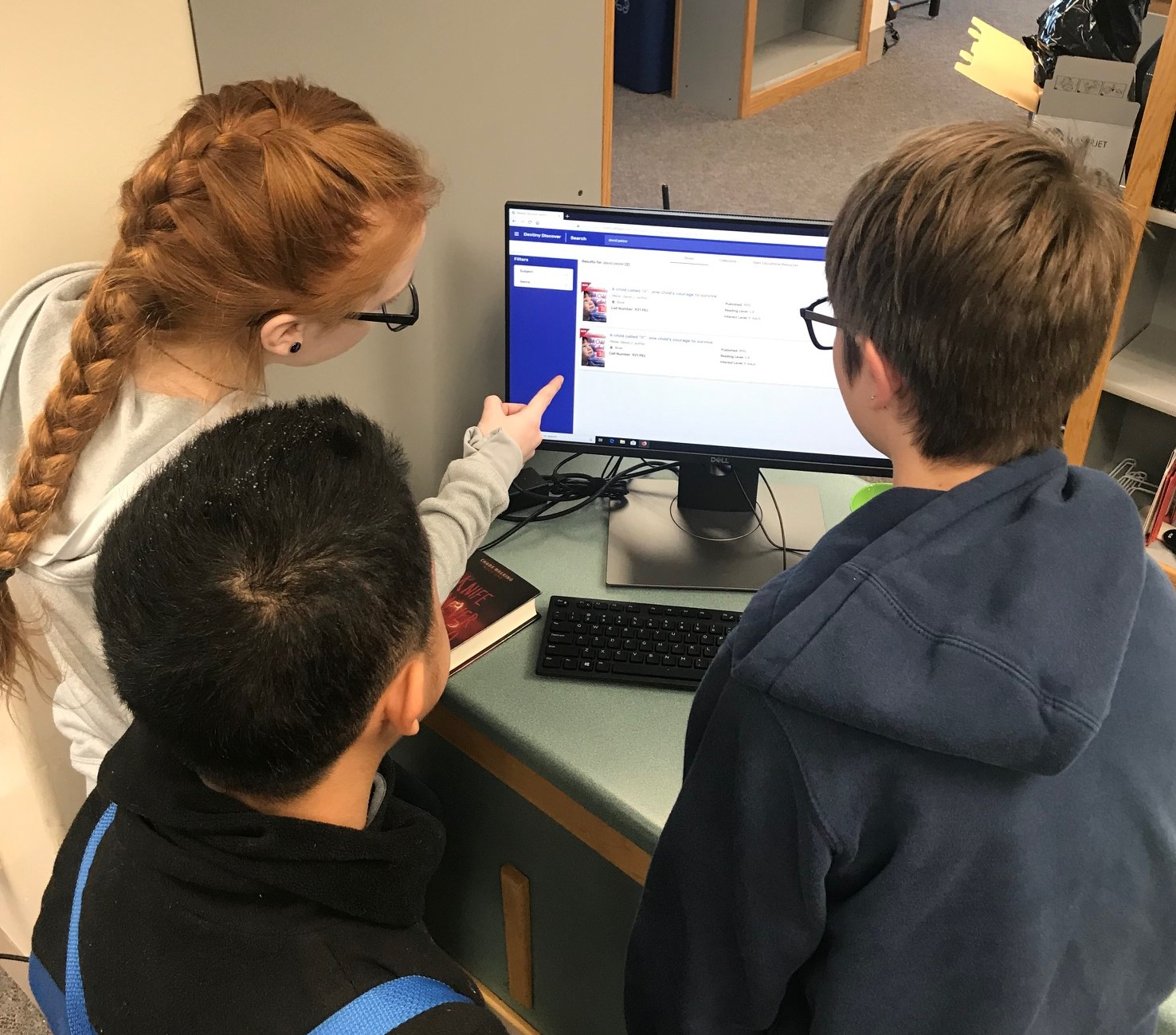
Students, from Robbinsdale Middle School (RMS) (Minnesota 2019) use an OPAC terminal to search for books, eBooks, and databases.

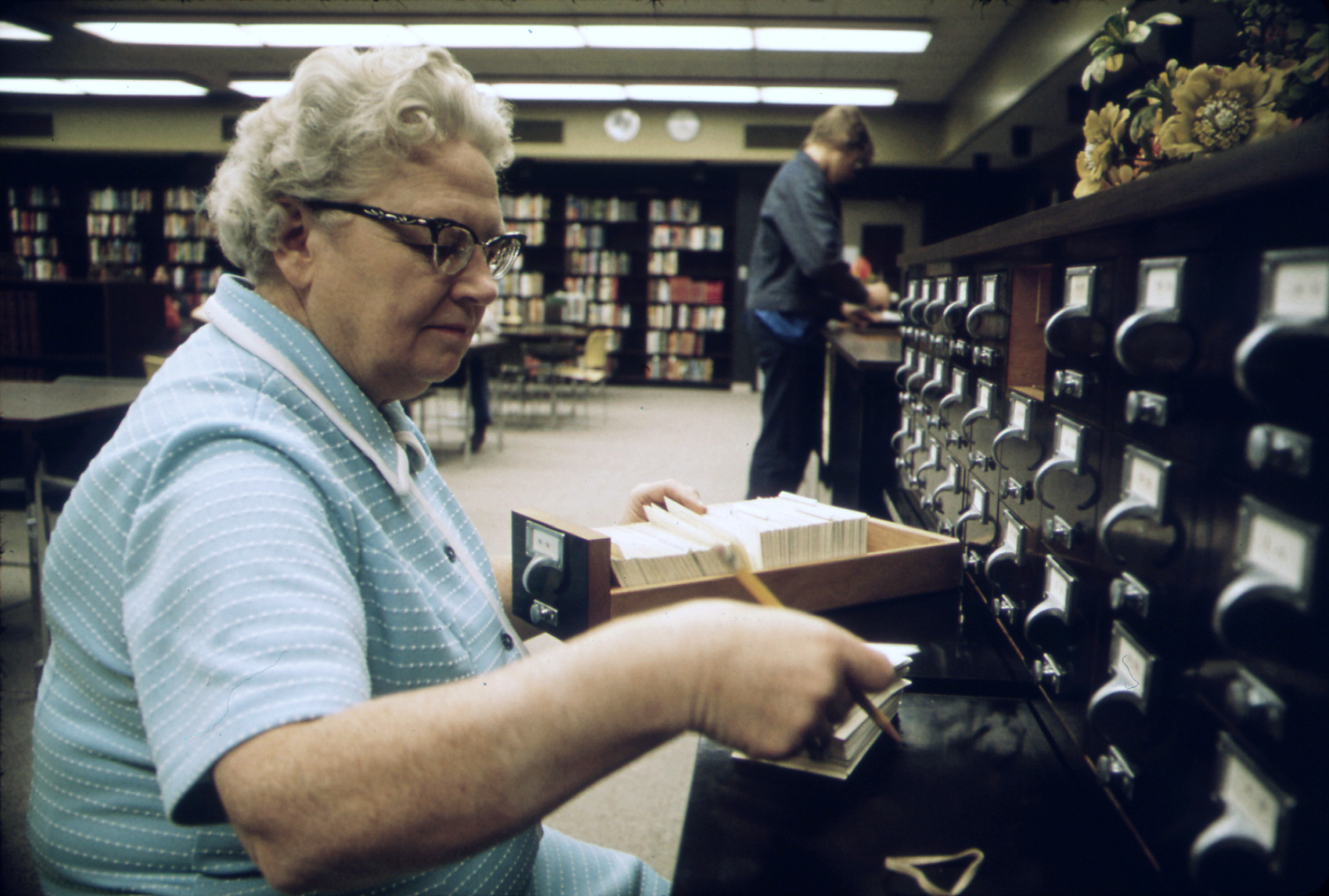
School librarian with card files (Minnesota, 1974) Photo for historical perspective. Most school libraries use a computer based electronic catalog for holdings and search functions and no longer use card catalogs.

=== Notable school librarians ===
- Laura Bush – Austin Independent School District
- Graham Gardner – Abingdon School
- Grant Lyons – Keystone School
- Laura Amy Schlitz – Park School of Baltimore

== See also ==
- American Association of School Libraries (AASL)
- Learning Resource Centre
- School Library Association (UK)
- Hannah Logasa
- Teacher-librarian
- Virtual school libraries in the United States
