= Education in Florida =

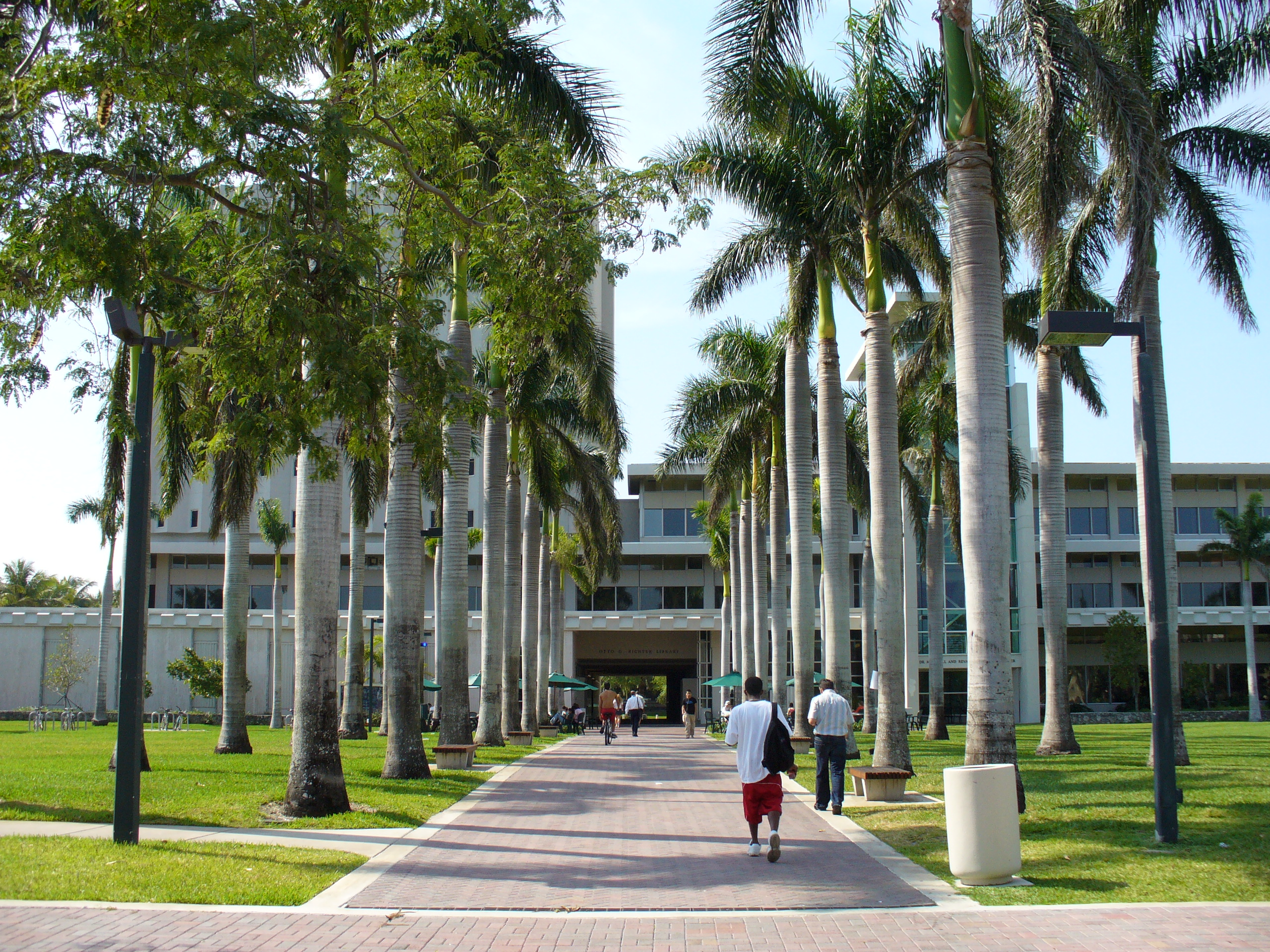
The University of Miami in Coral Gables

The Florida education system consists public, private and parochial schools in Florida, including the State University System of Florida (SUSF), the Florida College System (FCS), the Independent Colleges and Universities of Florida (ICUF) and other private institutions, and also secondary and primary schools as well as virtual schools. Florida has charter schools and programs for homeschooling. It also has a school choice program.

== Overview ==
Florida's public primary and secondary schools are administered by the Florida Department of Education (FLDOE). FLDOE also has authority over the Florida College System. The State University System is under the authority of the Florida Board of Governors.

As mandated by the Florida Constitution, Article IX, section 4, Florida has 67 school districts, one for each county. All are separate from municipal government. School districts tax property within their jurisdictions to support their budgets.

Florida has hundreds of private schools of all types. The FLDOE has no authority over private school operations. Private schools may or may not be accredited, and achievement tests are not required for private school graduating seniors. Many private schools obtain accreditation and perform achievement tests to show parents the school's interest in educational performance.

In the 2021-2022 school year, about 152,000 students in Florida were homeschooled. That number compares to about 55,000 homeschooled students in 2008 and 89,000 in 2017-2018. According to the FLDOE, homeschooling parents must maintain "a portfolio of activities, records and materials showing student work" for two years; the parents must submit this portfolio to officials of their local school district if required in writing. Homeschooling students are also required to undergo, each year, one of five academic evaluation options. The parents must submit the results of the evaluation to their local school district.

In August 2023, restrictions were placed on the teaching of Shakespearean plays and literature by Florida teachers in order to comply with state law.

=== Higher education ===
There are 12 public universities that comprise the State University System of Florida. In addition the Florida College System comprises 28 public community colleges and state colleges. In 2008 the State University System had 302,513 students. Florida also has private universities, some of which comprise the Independent Colleges and Universities of Florida. In 2010, nineteen of Florida's 28 community colleges were offering four year degree programs.

== Primary and secondary schools ==
As of 2023, there are 4,230 public elementary and secondary schools in Florida. This includes 941 secondary (high) schools, 588 middle schools, and 2,248 elementary schools, along with some Pre-K and others. These schools collectively served 2,870,527 students through the end of the 2021-2022 school year.

As of 2021, there are 2,640 private elementary and secondary schools in Florida, collectively serving 486,830 students.

Attempts to develop public schools began as early as 1831, when the Florida Education Society was founded in Tallahassee. After the Civil War, the state adopted a new constitution which established the Florida Department of Public Instruction, headed by the Florida Superintendent of Public Instruction. The legislature passed a law in 1869 to provide "a uniform system of public instruction, free to all the youth residing in the state between the age of six and twenty-one years", and C. Thurston Chase was appointed by the governor to serve as the first superintendent.

For most of the state's history, the schools were segregated by race. Prior to the civil war, little effort was made to educate African-American children, and in fact an 1832 law made it illegal to educate black people, whether slave or free. In 1885, the state passed a law prohibiting integrated education. In 1920 the state appointed J.H. Brinson as its first supervisor of Negro education. The state also maintained segregated schools for Seminoles.

From the end of the Reconstruction era in the 1870s until the 1940s, the state and local governments gave far less money to all-black public schools compared to the favored white public schools. (There were no racially integrated schools.) However, many private schools for Blacks were funded by Northern philanthropy well into the 20th century. Support came from the American Missionary Association; the Peabody Education Fund; the Jeanes Fund (also known as the Negro Rural School Fund); the Slater Fund; the Rosenwald Fund; the Southern Education Foundation; and the General Education Board, which was massively funded by the Rockefeller family.

In 1954, Brown v. Board of Education, a United States Supreme Court case, declared segregated schools illegal, but few changes were made in Florida. Although a 1960 law repealed the prohibition on integration, it was not until 1963 that a black student, Chester Seabury, petitioned the Broward Board of Education, gained admittance, and became the first African-American to graduate from a white high school in Florida. In 1968, a constitutional revision replaced the Department of Public Instruction with the Department of Education, which is headed by the Commissioner of Education.

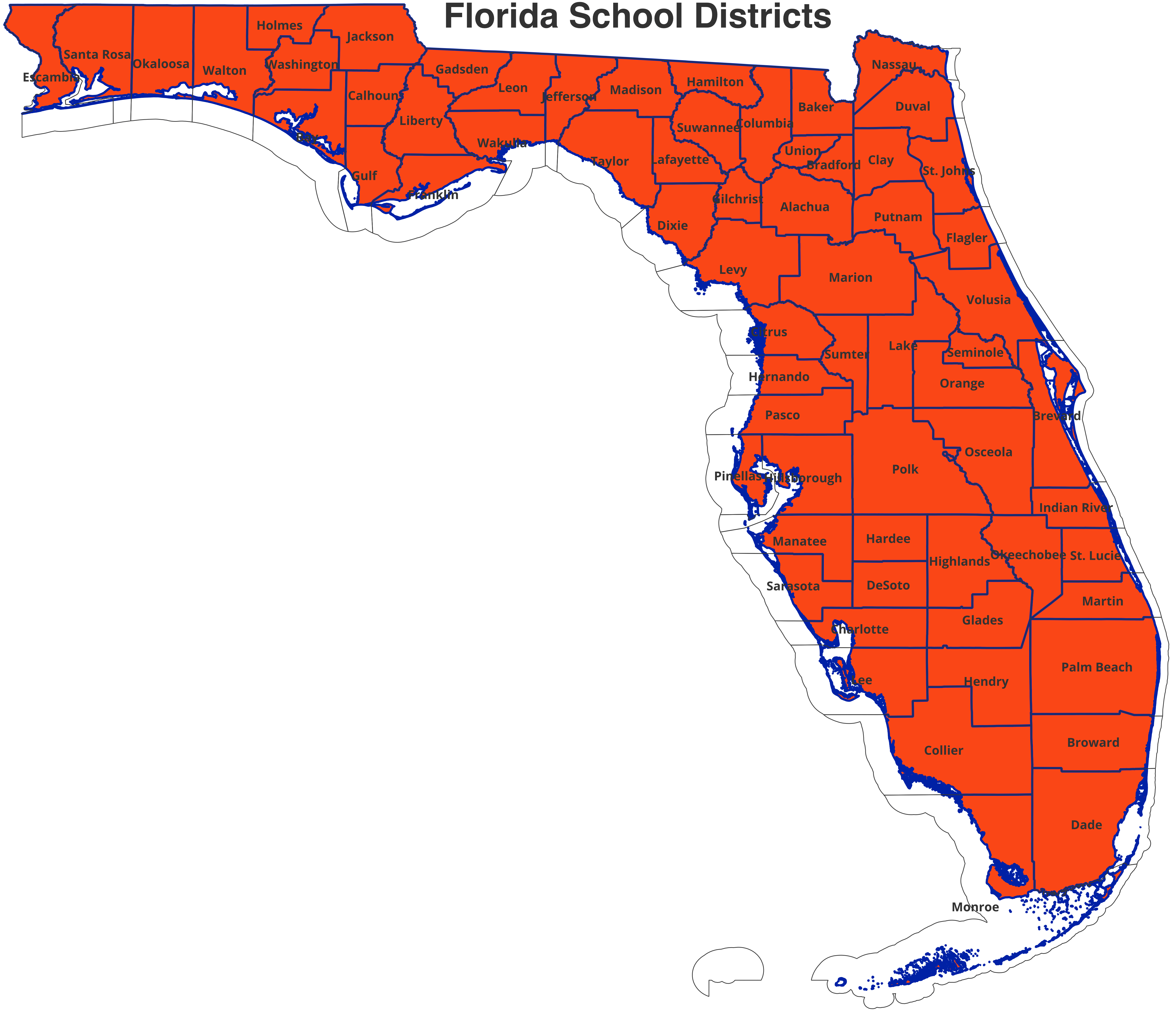
Florida school districts align with the county lines.

School districts are organized within Florida's 67 county boundaries. Each school district has an elected Board of education which sets policy, budget, goals and approves expenditures. Management is the responsibility of a Superintendent of schools.

The Florida Constitution allows districts to either elect the superintendent in a popular election (the default provision) or choose (via popular election) to allow the school board to appoint the superintendent. As of 2010, school boards in 25 districts (Alachua, Brevard, Broward, Charlotte, Collier, Duval, Flagler, Hernando, Hillsborough, Indian River, Lake, Lee, Manatee, Miami-Dade, Okeechobee, Orange, Osceola, Palm Beach, Pinellas, Polk, Saint Johns, Saint Lucie, Sarasota, Seminole, and Volusia) appointed the superintendent; the remaining districts elect their superintendent.

Education Week evaluated Florida's schools for 2010, fifth in the nation overall, with As for student testing, teacher accountability and progress on closing the achievement gap. It gave the state an F for per-pupil spending.

In 2011, the liberal Center for American Progress stated that for half the states it studied, it found no correlation between spending and achievement after allowing for cost of living, and students living in poverty. The Center commended Florida as one of two states that provides annual school-level productivity evaluations which report to the public how well school funds are being spent at the local level.

Florida's public-school revenue per student and spending per $1000 of personal income usually rank in the bottom 25 percent of U.S. states. Average teacher salaries rank near the middle of U.S. states.

Florida public schools once consistently ranked in the bottom 25 percent of many national surveys and average test-score rankings before allowances for race are made. When allowance for race is considered, a 2007 US Government list of test scores shows Florida white fourth graders performed 13th in the nation for reading (232), 12th for math (250); while black fourth graders were 11th for math (225), 12th for reading (208). White eighth graders scored 30th for math (289) and 36th for reading (268). Neither score was considered statistically significant from average. Black eighth graders ranked 19th on math (259), 25th on reading (244). However, phonics-based education following the pattern of the Mississippi Miracle have corresponded with significant growth over the past fifteen years.

In 2002, voters approved a constitutional amendment to limit class size in public schools starting in the 2010-11 school year from 18 in lower grades to 23 in high school. This was phased in by the legislature from 2003 to 2009, to promote compliance when the amendment took effect. As of March 2011, 28 school districts had failed to comply and owed fines, which were to be redistributed to districts that were in compliance.

Florida, like other states, appears to substantially undercount dropouts in reporting.

Some school districts had backed up the start of the academic year well into August in order to complete the semester and exams before the December holiday break. In 2006, the legislature required districts to start no earlier than two weeks before the end of August, but that was changed in 2015 to no earlier than August 10. The state requires that each school teach for 180 days. Private schools may be open for more than 170 days.

Florida does not handpick the best students to take the Advanced Placement exams.

In 2010, there were about 60,750 foreign-born children of illegal immigrants attending public schools. The cost per year averaged $9,035 annually. The total cost of educating these children is over $548 million.

Paddling students for discipline is legal in Florida.

=== History ===
Florida had a voucher system for low-income families from failing school districts from 1999 until 2006. In the final year, 750 students out of 190,000 eligible made this choice. The state paid an average of $4,000 per student as opposed to the $7,206 per student attending public schools.

The system was overturned by the Florida Supreme Court for violating separation of church and state, since some students used these for church schools.

Between 2000 and 2008, school enrollment increased 6%, the number of teachers 20%.

For 2012, StudentsFirst, a political lobbying organization, ranked Florida second among the fifty states, for policy related to education reform.

=== Sports ===
As in most areas, high schools compete in sports in two types of division. One, because of logistical and geographical constraints, is necessarily local. That is, large schools play small ones in the same area. A second division is based on school population and is statewide. Eventually, schools with the best records in this type of division will meet each other for seasonal playoffs to determine the state champion.

Competition is under the auspices of the Florida High School Athletic Association.

=== Funding ===
In the fiscal year 2007-2008, the Florida Educational Enhancement Trust Fund received $1.28 billion from the Florida Lottery, passing the billion-dollar mark for the sixth time in the lottery's 20-year history. As of 2009, the current lottery's total contribution since start-up was more than $19 billion.

=== School choice ===
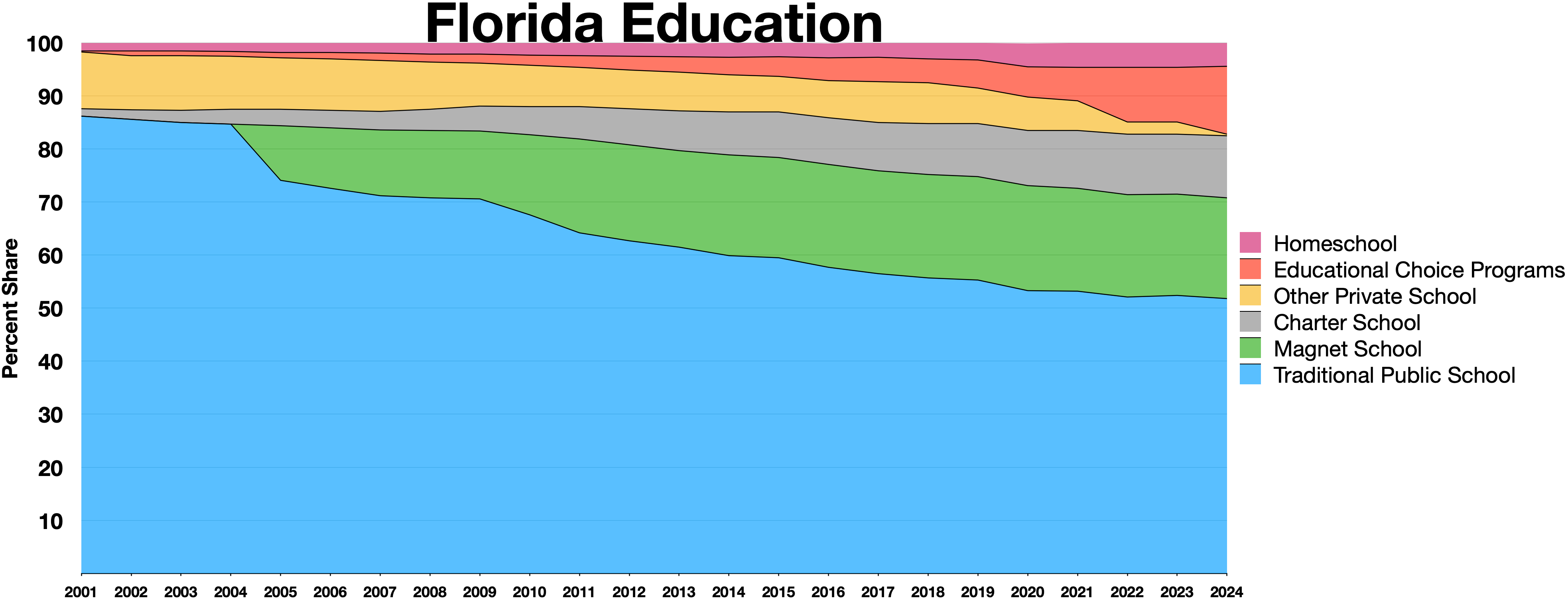
Florida Education Homeschool EdChoice Private school Charter school Magnet school Public school

Florida provides various voucher programs allowing K-12 students to enroll in schools outside their local school district, including other public schools, private schools, home schooling and charter schools.

From the school year 2019-20 through the school year 2022-2023, enrollment in Florida's private schools grew to 445,000 students, an increase of 47,000. During the same period, the number of homeschooled children in the state rose to 154,000, an increase of 50,000.

== Public colleges and universities ==
In 2010, the annual tuition alone, at Florida's 12 public universities was $4,886, third lowest in the country. The average cost total for books, tuition, fees, and living expenses, is $15,500 compared to $16,140 average for the country.

In an attempt to save money, entering students may take nationally standardized Advanced Placement exams. In 2010, 67,741 Florida seniors took the exam. 33,712 scored 3 or more, sufficient for advanced placement. A total of 307,000 Florida students took AP exams in 2010. 64,000 scored a minimum of three or more; 43,000 scoring a four or higher.

=== State University System of Florida ===
The State University System of Florida manages and funds Florida's twelve public universities and a public Liberal Arts college:

- Florida A&M University
- Florida Atlantic University
- Florida Gulf Coast University
- Florida International University
- Florida Polytechnic University
- Florida State University
- New College of Florida
- University of Central Florida
- University of North Florida
- University of Florida
- University of South Florida
- University of West Florida

In 2009, the system employed 45,000 people statewide. The budget was $4.1 billion for community colleges and universities.

In 2000, the governor and the state legislature abolished the Florida Board of Regents, which long had governed the State University System of Florida, and created boards of trustees to govern each university. As is typical of executive-appointed government boards, the appointees so far have predominantly belonged to the governor's party. This effect has not been without controversy. In 2002, former governor and then-U.S. Senator Bob Graham (Dem.) led a constitutional-amendment ballot referendum designed to restore the board-of-regents system. Voters approved. Therefore, the legislature created the Florida Board of Governors; however, each university still maintains a board of trustees which work under the board of governors. During Florida's 2007 legislative session, Governor Charlie Crist signed into law SB-1710, which allowed the board of governors to allow a tuition differential for the University of Florida, Florida State University, and the University of South Florida. This legislation ultimately created a tier system for higher education in Florida's State University System.

=== Florida College System ===
The Florida College System manages and funds Florida's 28 public community colleges and state colleges, with over 100 locations throughout the state of Florida.

- Broward College
- Chipola College
- College of Central Florida
- Daytona State College
- Eastern Florida State College
- Edison State College
- Florida Keys Community College
- Florida State College at Jacksonville
- Gulf Coast State College
- Hillsborough Community College
- Indian River State College
- Florida Gateway College
- Lake-Sumter State College
- Miami Dade College
- North Florida Community College
- Northwest Florida State College
- Palm Beach State College
- Pasco–Hernando State College
- Pensacola State College
- Polk State College
- Santa Fe College
- Seminole State College of Florida
- South Florida State College
- St. Johns River State College
- St. Petersburg College
- State College of Florida, Manatee-Sarasota
- Tallahassee Community College
- Valencia College
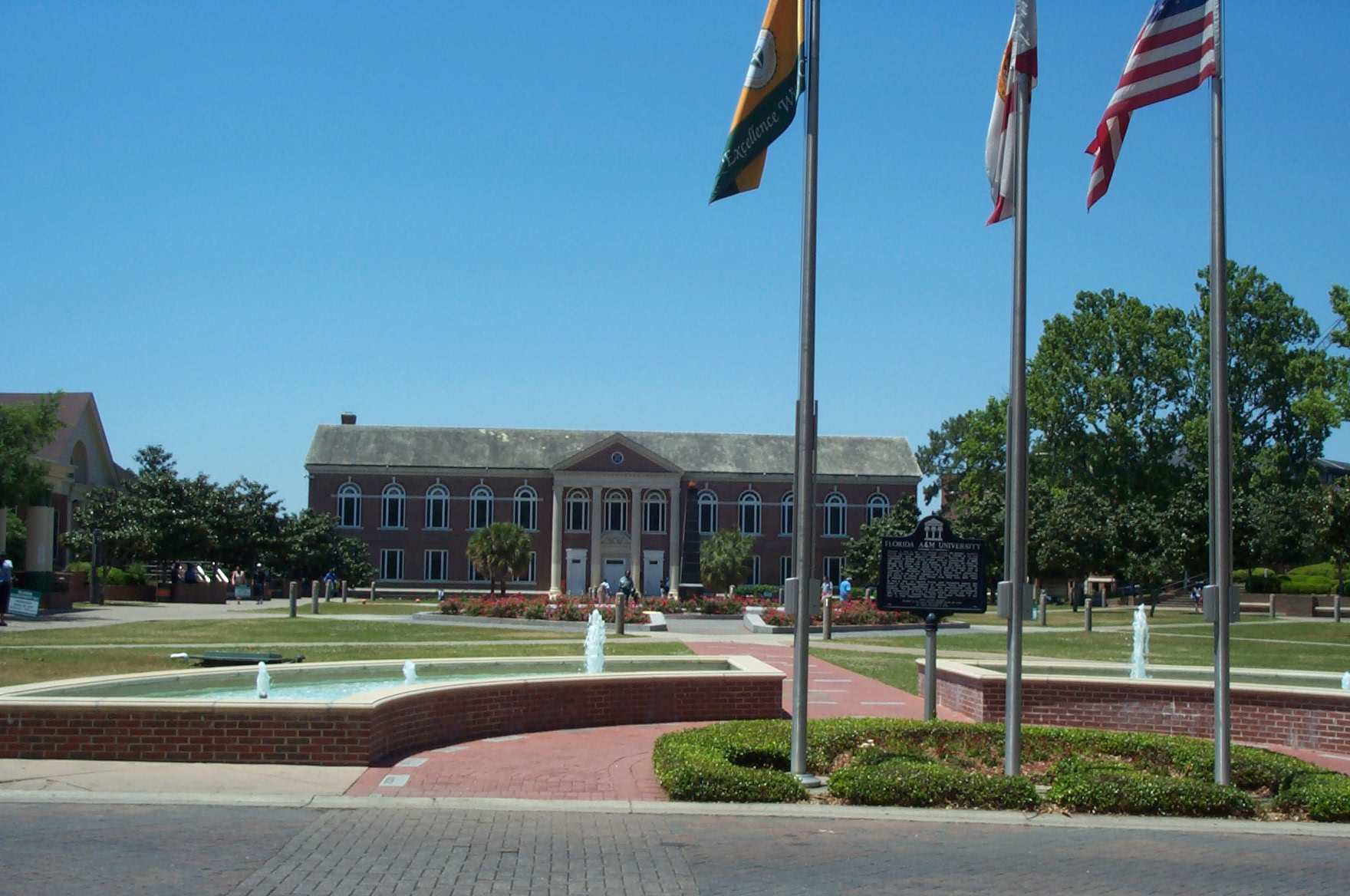
Florida A&M University
Tallahassee

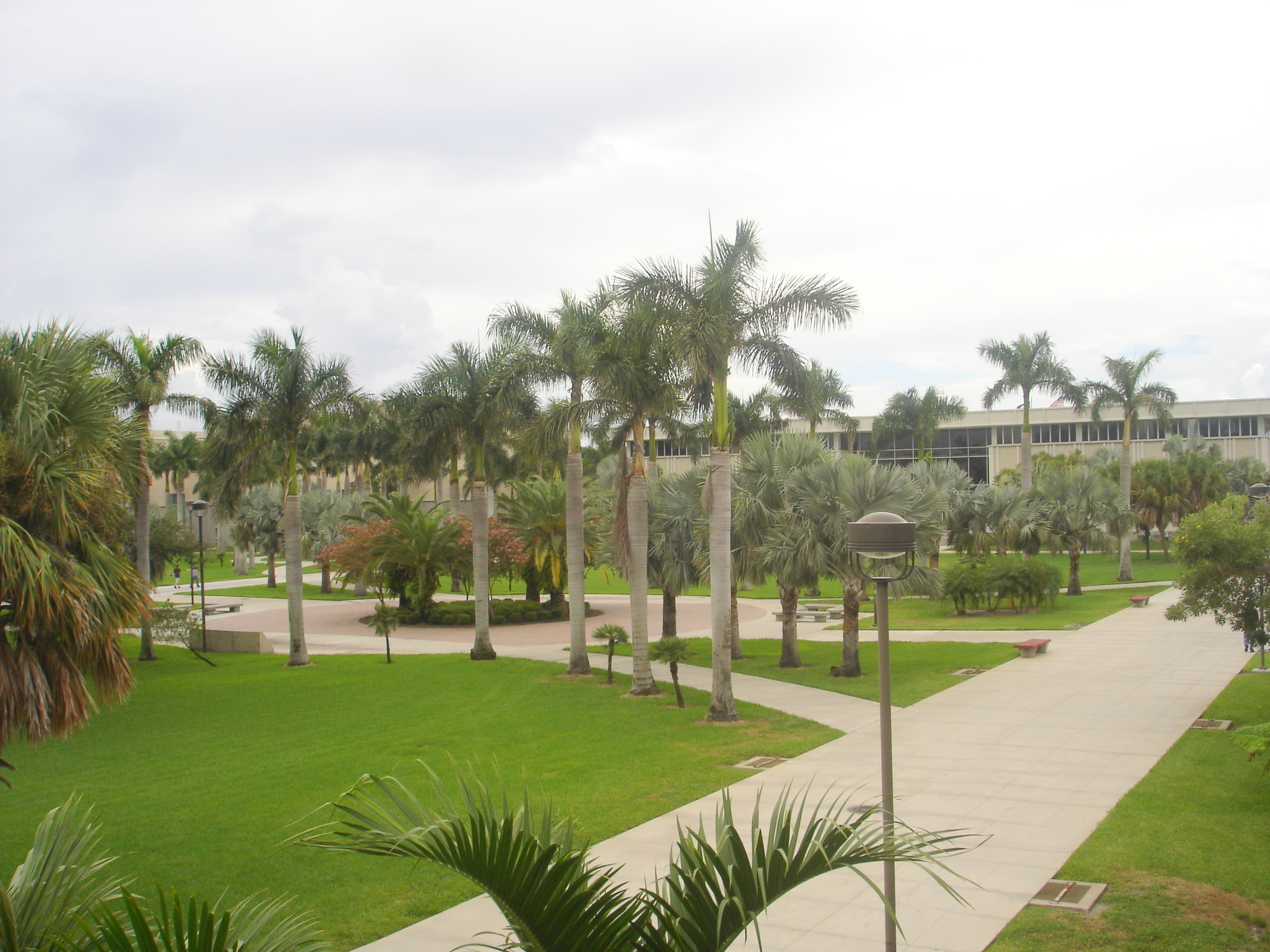
Florida Atlantic University
Boca Raton

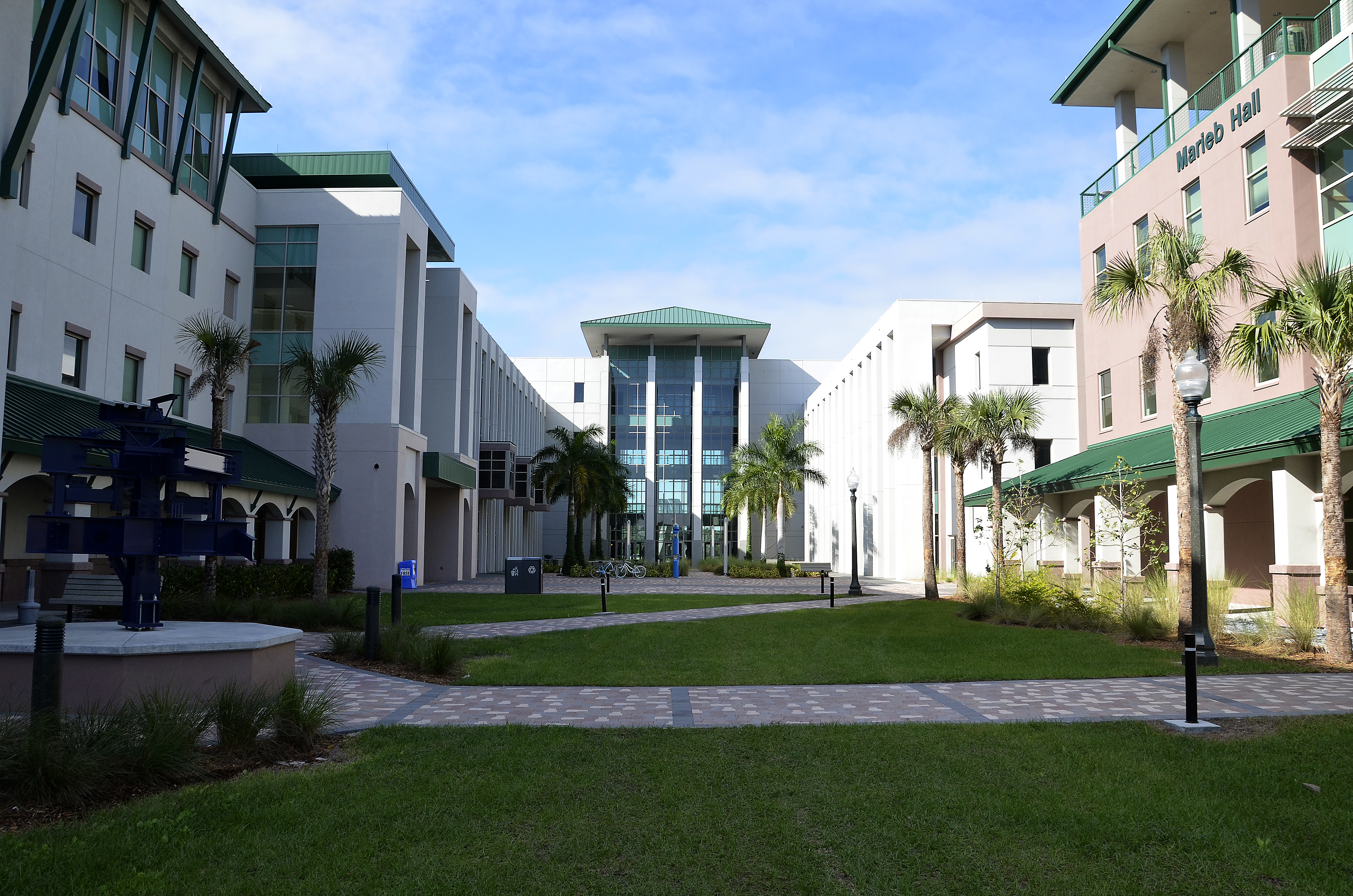
Florida Gulf Coast University
Fort Myers

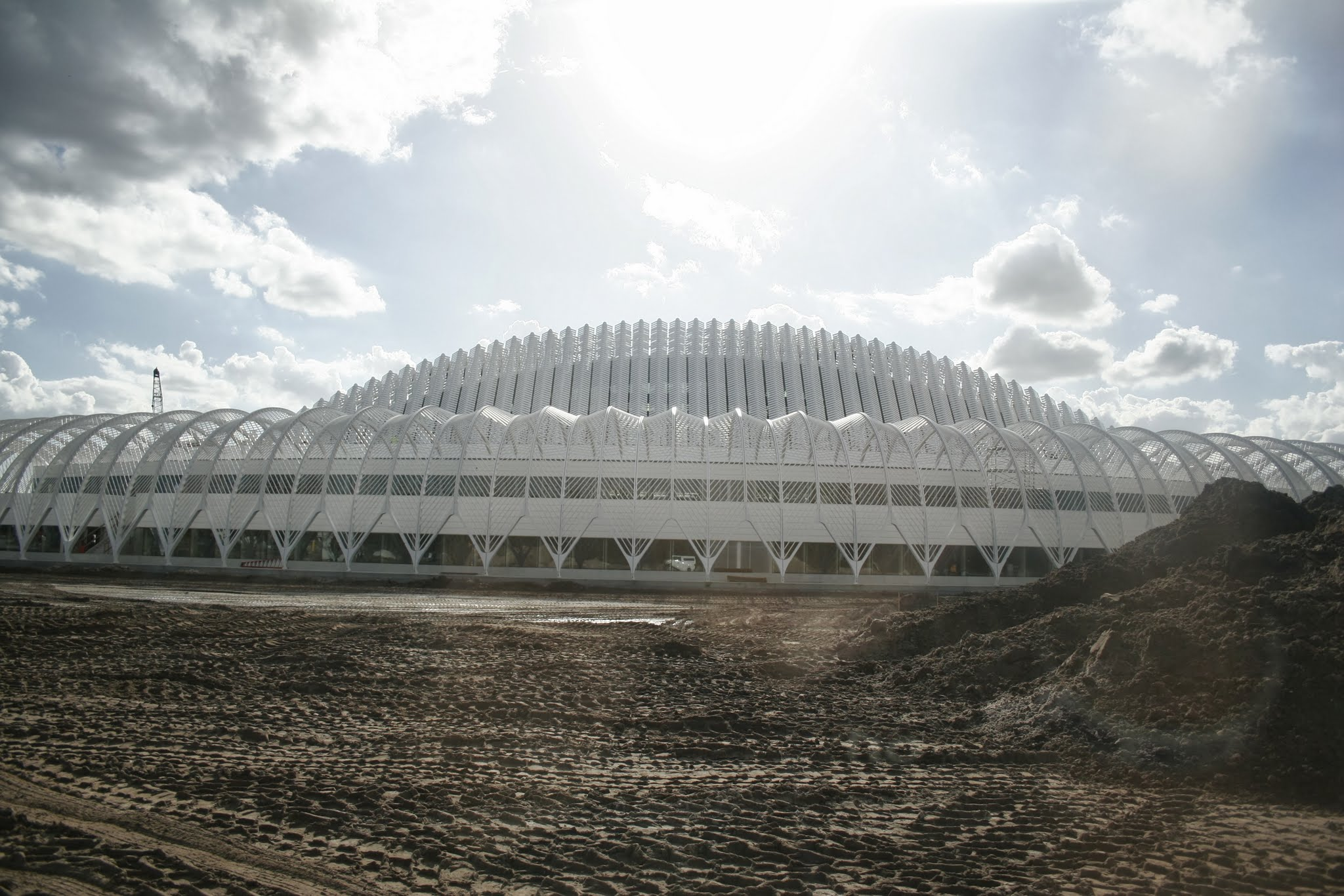
Florida Polytechnic University
Lakeland

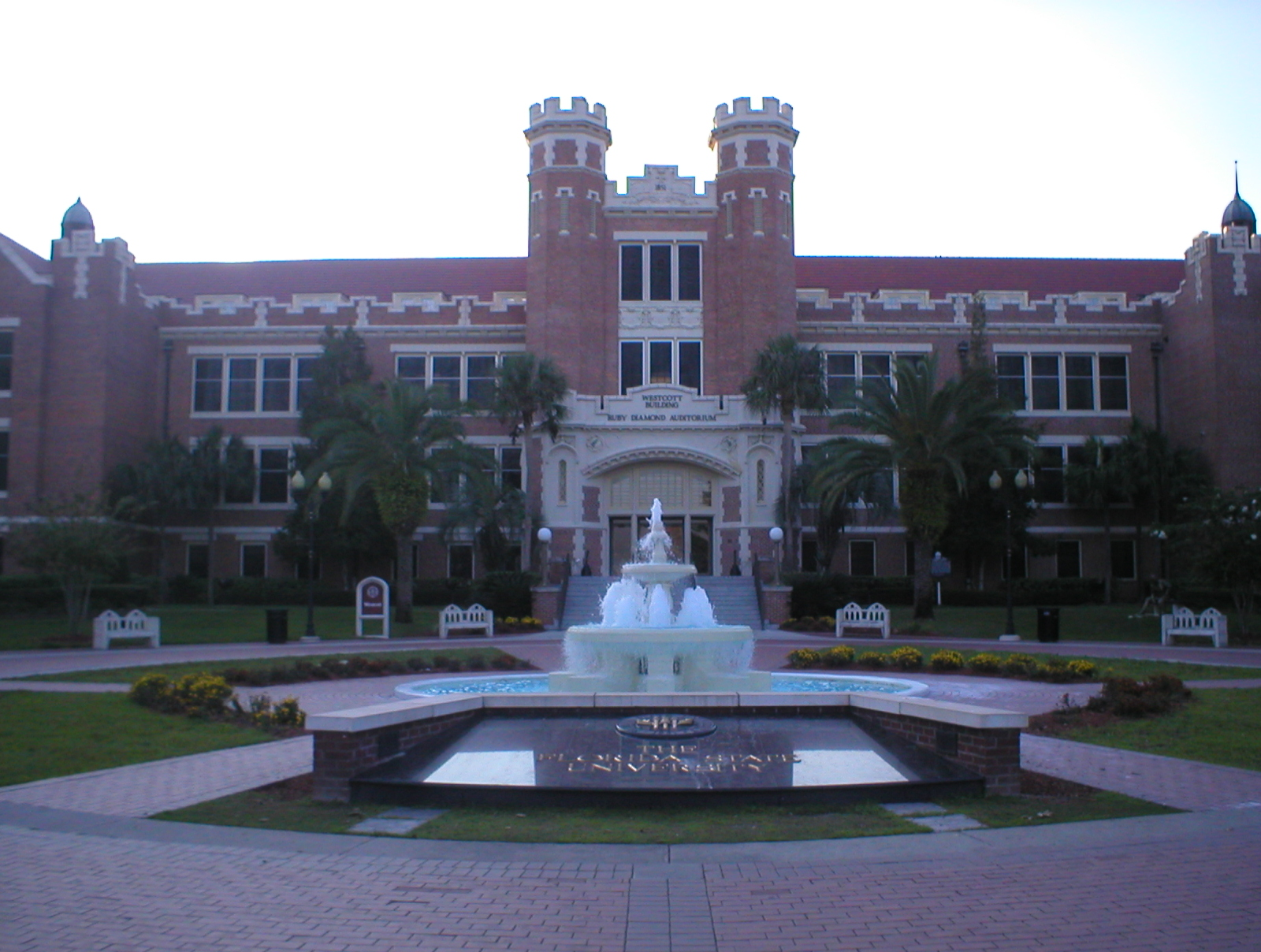
Florida State University
Tallahassee

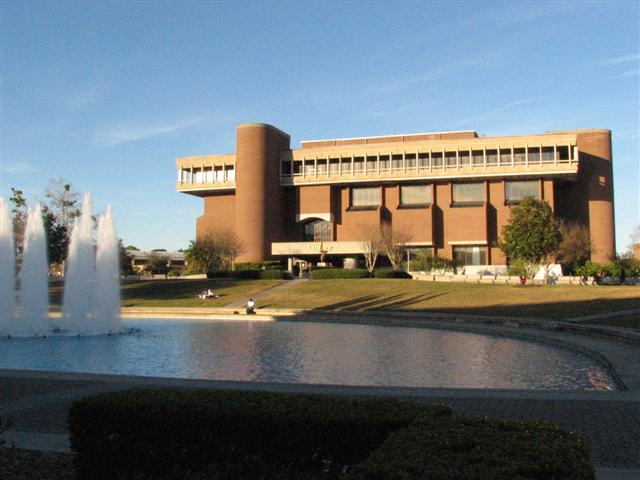
University of Central Florida
Orlando

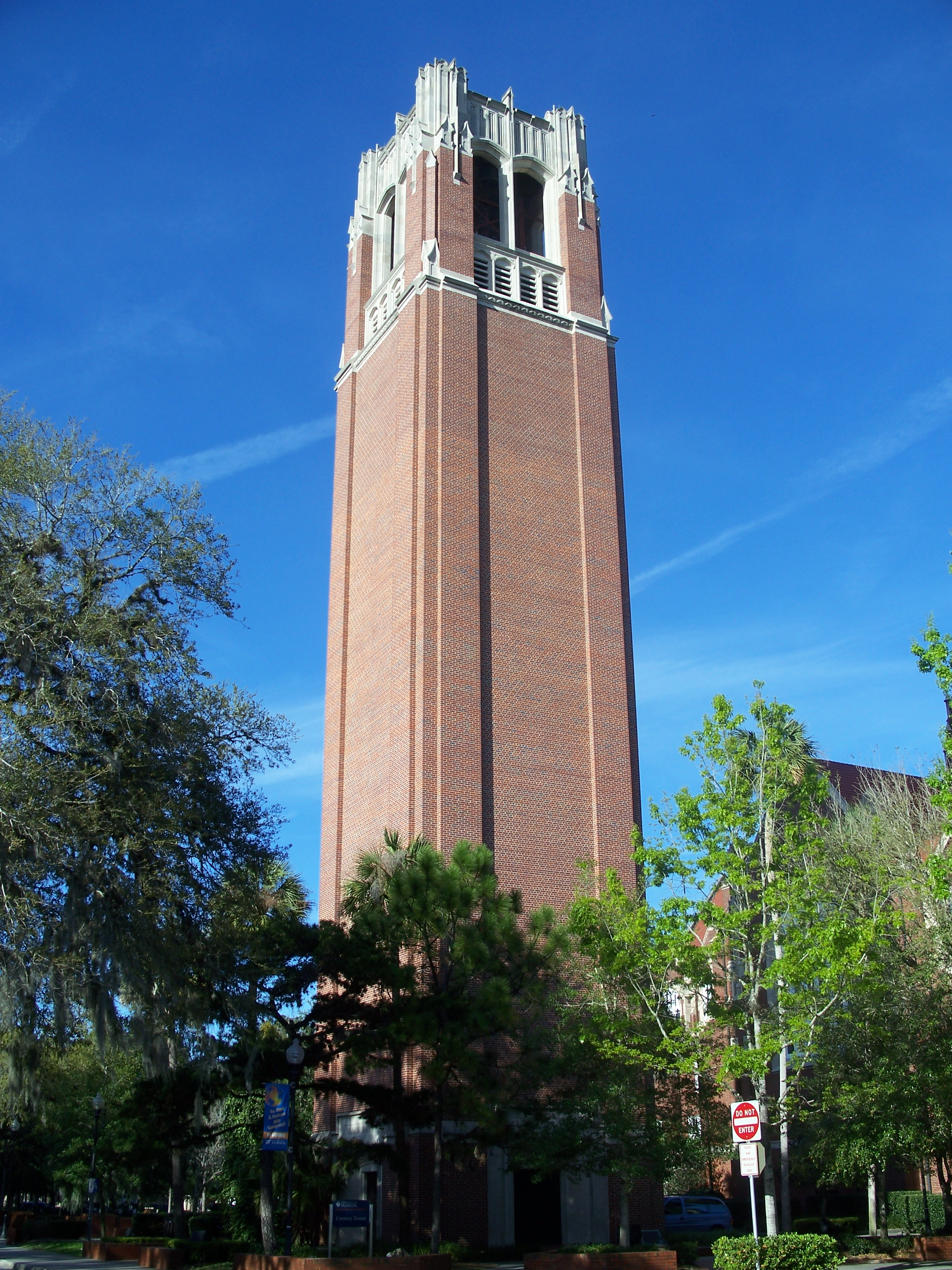
University of Florida
Gainesville

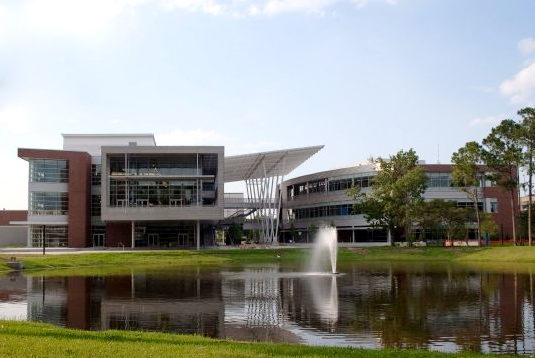
University of North Florida
Jacksonville

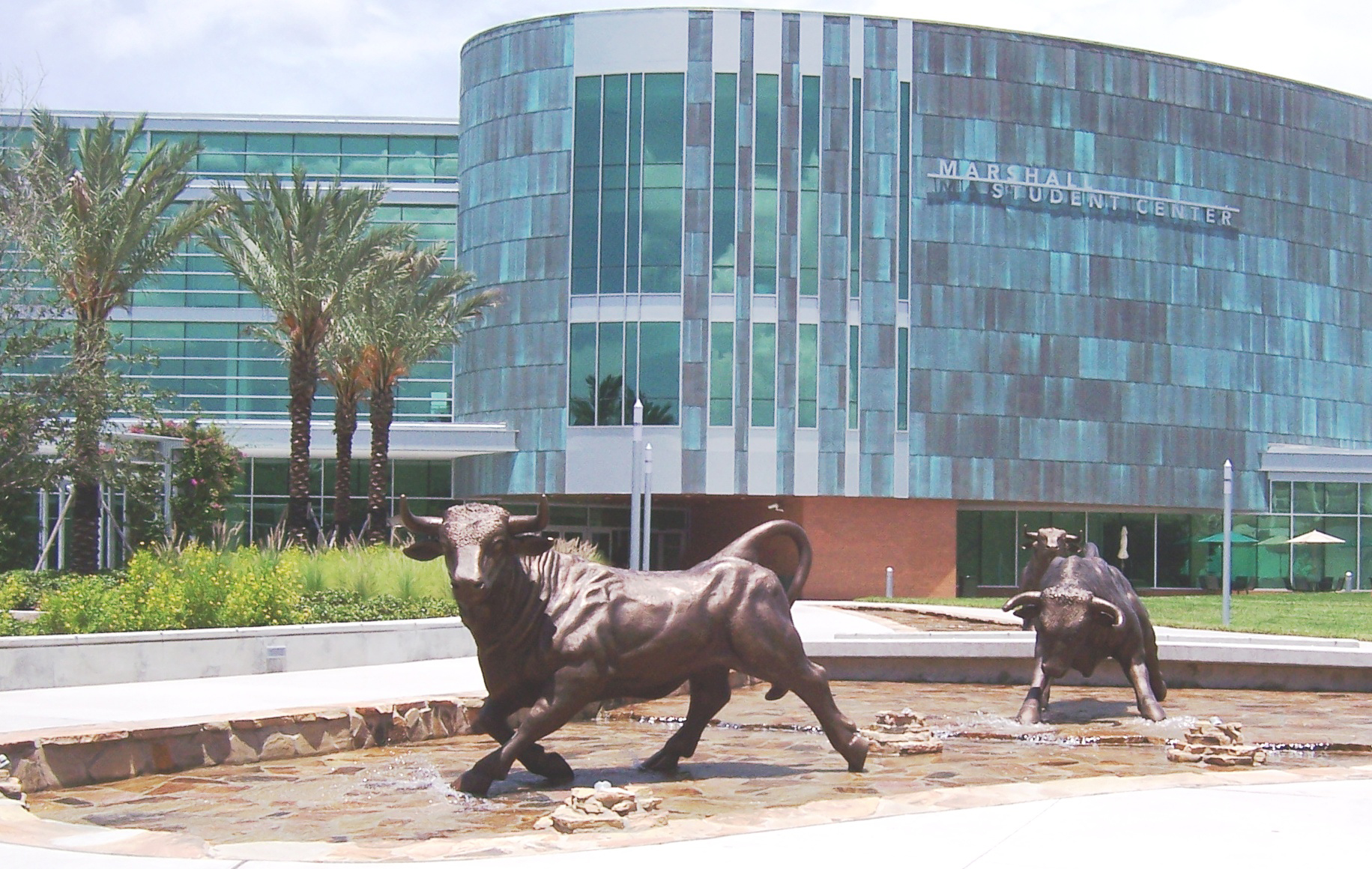
University of South Florida
Tampa

== Private colleges and universities ==
The Independent Colleges and Universities of Florida is an association of around 30 private, educational institutions in the state of Florida. The association reported that their member institutions enrolled over 121,000 students in the fall of 2006.

- Adventist University of Health Sciences, Orlando
- Ave Maria University, Ave Maria
- Barry University, Miami Shores
- Beacon College, Leesburg
- Bethune-Cookman University, Daytona Beach
- Clearwater Christian College, Clearwater
- Eckerd College, St. Petersburg
- Edward Waters College, Jacksonville
- Embry-Riddle Aeronautical University, Daytona Beach
- Everglades University
- Flagler College, Saint Augustine
- Florida Coastal School of Law, Jacksonville
- Florida College, Tampa
- Florida Institute of Technology, Melbourne
- Florida Memorial University, Miami
- Florida Southern College, Lakeland
- Gordon-Conwell Theological Seminary (Jacksonville, Florida)
- Hodges University, Naples
- Jacksonville University, Jacksonville
- Keiser University, multiple locations
- Lynn University, Boca Raton
- Nova Southeastern University, Fort Lauderdale
- Palm Beach Atlantic University, West Palm Beach
- Pensacola Christian College (Pensacola)
- Reformed Theological Seminary (Orlando)
- Ringling College of Art and Design, Sarasota
- Rollins College, Orlando
- Saint Leo University, Saint Leo
- Saint Thomas University, Miami
- Southeastern University, Lakeland
- Stetson University, DeLand
- University of Miami, Coral Gables
- University of Tampa, Tampa
- Warner University, Lake Wales
- Webber International University, Babson Park
- Yeshiva V'Kollel Beis Moshe Chaim
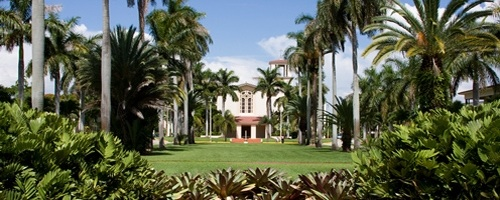
Barry University
Miami Shores

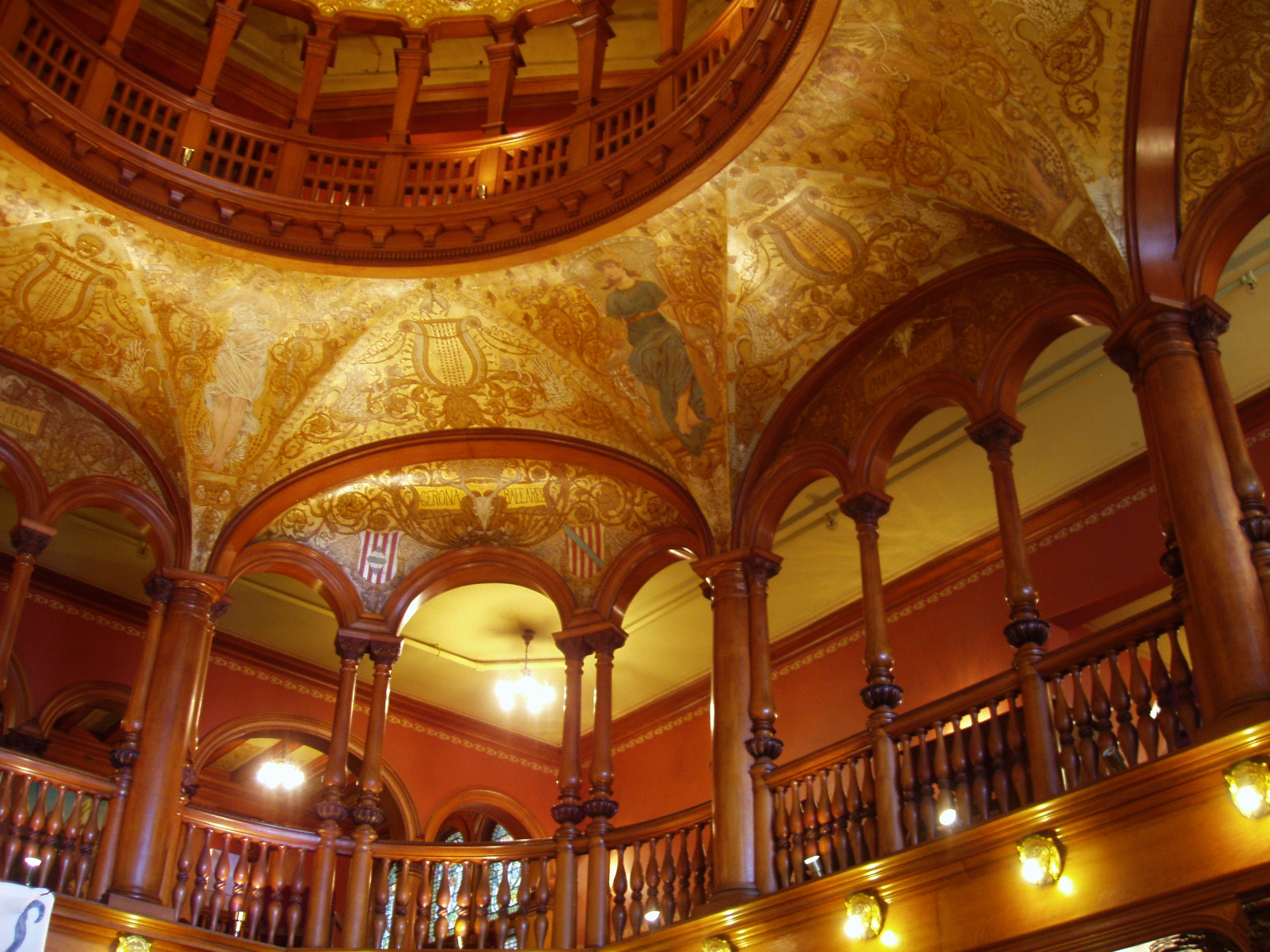
Flagler College
Saint Augustine

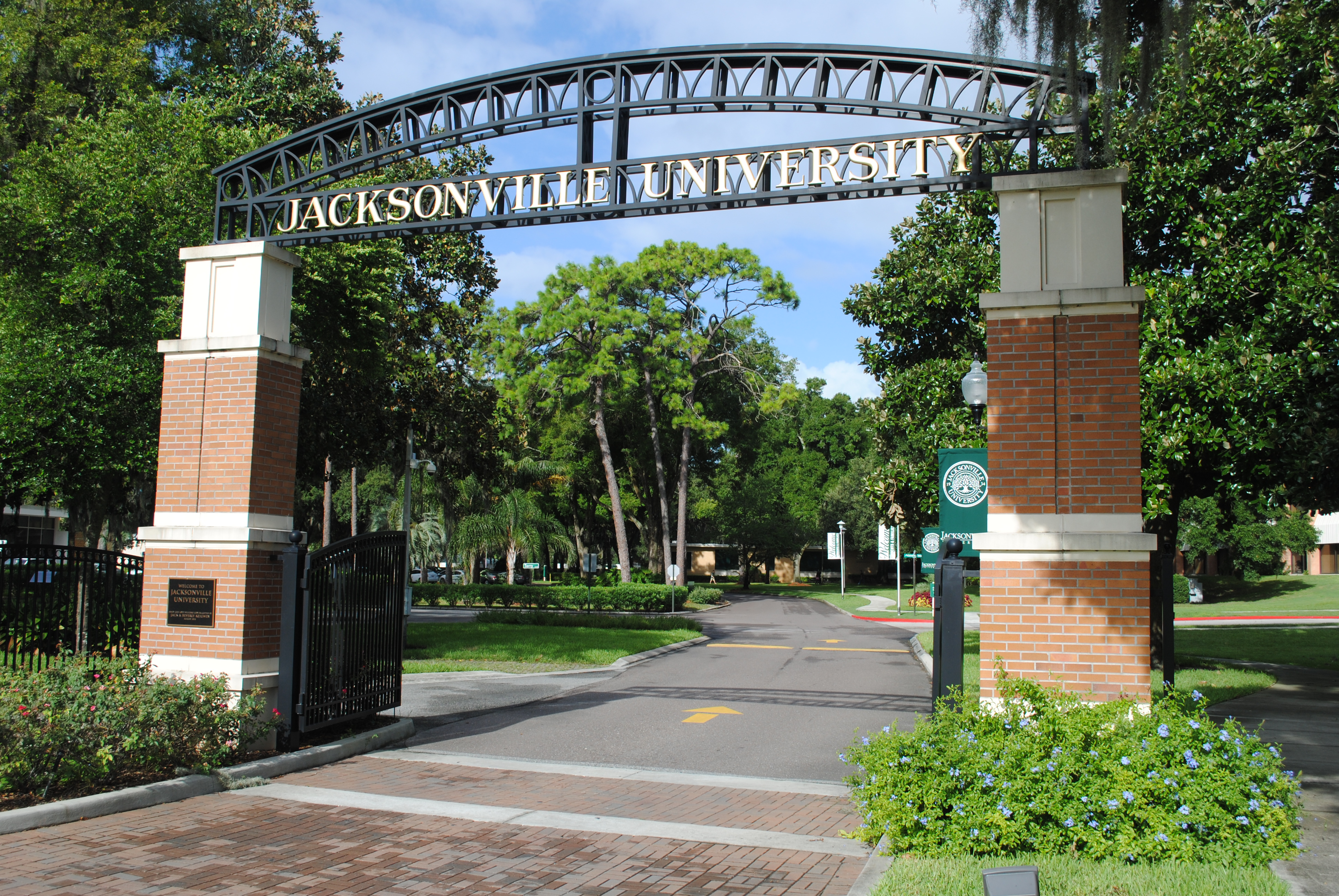
Jacksonville University
Jacksonville

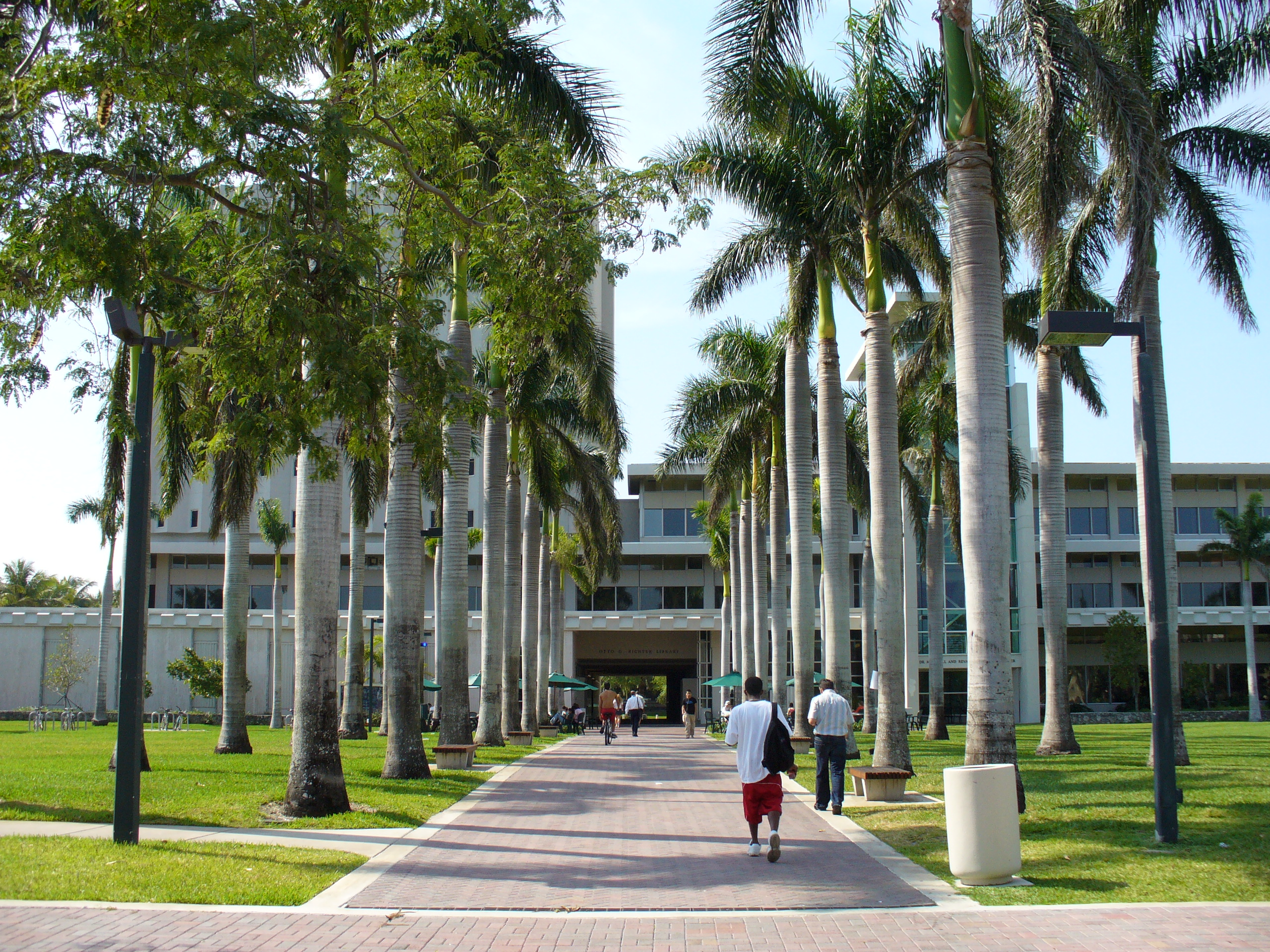
University of Miami
Coral Gables

Nova Southeastern University
Fort Lauderdale

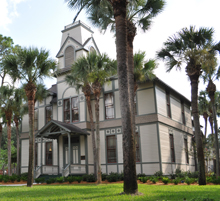
Stetson University
DeLand

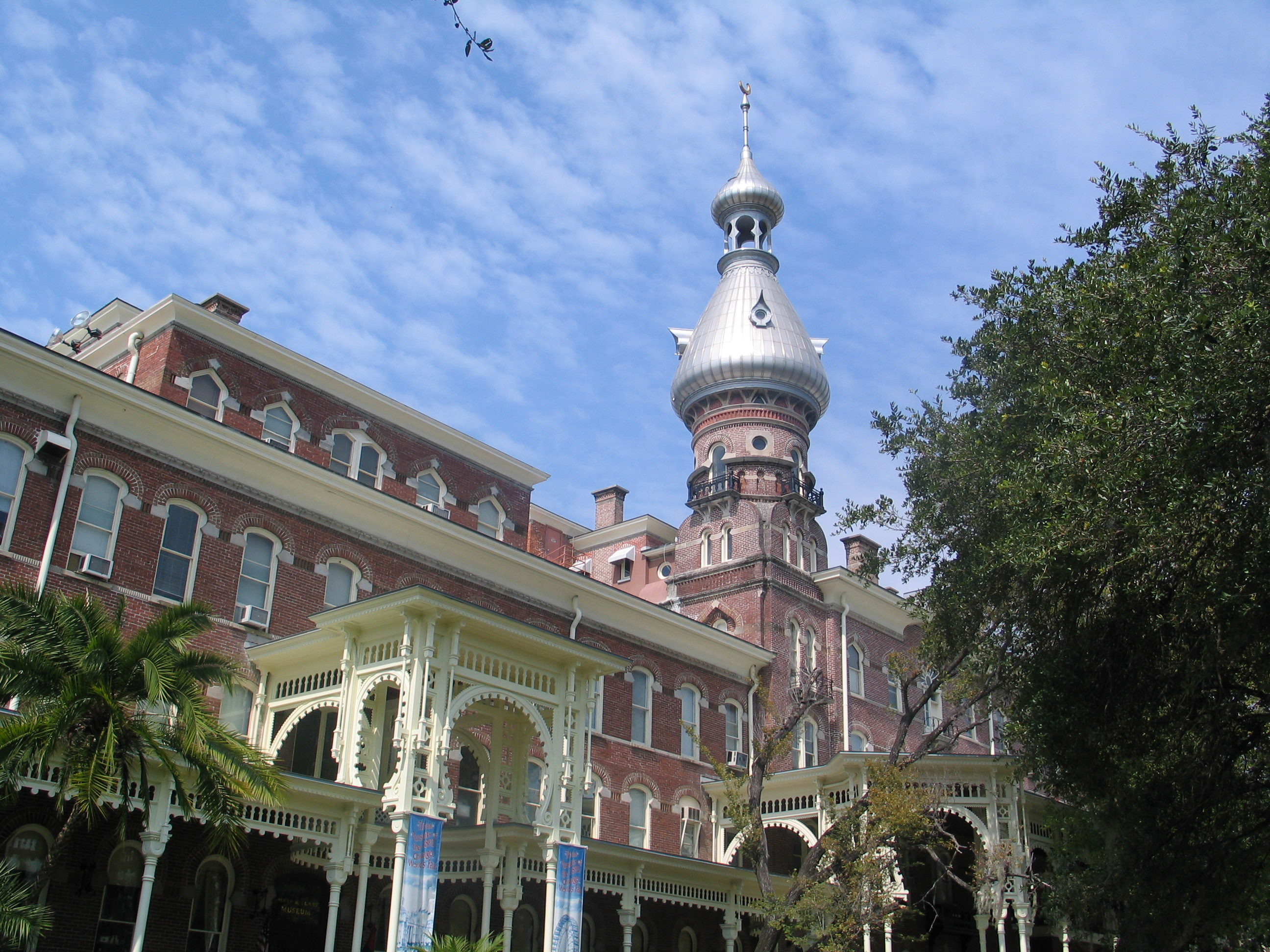
University of Tampa
Tampa

Additionally, there are many colleges and universities that are not affiliated with the ICUF.

- Baptist College of Florida
- Boca Raton Arts College
- Carlos Albizu University
- Everest University
- Johnson University Florida
- Fort Lauderdale Institute of Art
- The Art Institute of Jacksonville, Jacksonville
- Florida National University
- Full Sail University
- Hindu University of America (Orlando)
- Hobe Sound College
- Johnson & Wales University
- Jones College
- Miami International University
- Orlando Culinary Academy
- Pensacola Christian College
- Rasmussen College
- Saint John's College
- Schiller International University
- Talmudic University of Florida (Miami Beach)
- Touro College South (Miami Beach)
- Trinity Baptist College, Jacksonville
- Trinity College, New Port Richey
- Yeshiva Gedolah Rabbinical College - Lubavitch (Miami Beach)

== See also ==
- Florida College System
- Florida Virtual School
- Pasco eSchool
- Florida Board of Governors
- Florida Department of Education
- State University System of Florida
- List of colleges and universities in Florida
- Corporal punishment in Florida
