= List of online high schools in Florida =

Florida offers resident students the opportunity to take online high school courses.

== Private virtual high schools ==
The list of private and public online schools in Florida include the following:

- American Nation Builders College Preparatory Academy (www.AmericanNationBuilders.org)
- Solid Rock Virtual Academy
- American High School (AmericanHighSchool.org)
- Christian Educators Academy
- NorthStar Academy (Mississippi)
- Laurel Springs School
- Smart Horizons Career Online High School
- AIU High School
- Excel High School
- Keystone National High School
- Penn Foster
- WiloStar3D
- K12.com
- Forest Trail Academy
- Citizens High School

== Public online high schools ==
- Osceola Virtual School
- Broward Virtual School
- Miami-Dade Virtual School
- Pasco eSchool
- Florida Virtual School (FLVS)
- Duval Virtual Instruction Academy
