= Cambridge Prep Academy =

School in Florida, United States

Coordinates: 30.1524300°N 82.6441901°W

Information
- Established: 2012; 14 years ago
- Grades: K-12
- Website: www.cambridgeprepacademy.org

Cambridge Prep Academy is a Christian school that goes from kindergarten to twelfth grade. It was founded in 2012. It is located in downtown Lake City, Florida.

The school uses Florida Virtual School (FLVS) along with teachers in classes.
