= Pasco eSchool =

K-12 virtual school in Pasco County

- Pasco eSchool official logo and mascot

Location
- 8916 Angeline School Way; Land O' Lakes, Pasco County, Florida; United States; 28°17′13″N 82°32′13″W

Information
- School type: Online school
- Established: July 7, 2009; 17 years ago
- Founder: JoAnne Glenn (first principal)
- School district: Pasco County Schools
- Principal: Lori Wiggins
- Staff: ~150
- Grades: K–12
- Enrollment: 1,480 students
- Student to teacher ratio: 19:1
- Campus: Angeline Academy of Innovation school campus
- Colors: Red and Black
- Mascot: Ninja
- Accreditation: Advanced ED; SACS-CASI
- National ranking: 6,588
- School franchisor: Florida Virtual School
- Teaching personnel: ~123
- School funders: Pasco County Schools; State of Florida
- School year: 180 days
- Grace period: 28 days
- Website: https://eschool.pasco.k12.fl.us/

Pasco eSchool is a public K–12 online school in Pasco County, Florida, United States. Founded in 2009 as part of Pasco County Schools, the school operates as a district franchise of Florida Virtual School. The school maintains office space at Angeline Academy of Innovation, which it uses for administrative and occasional in-person activities.

Soon after it was founded, in 2011, Pasco eSchool expanded to a K–12 program, expanding to one of the largest virtual schools in the country. Enrollment significantly increased during the COVID–19 pandemic in 2020 and 2021, with over 2,800 students additional students attending the school.

Pasco eSchool has full-time and part-time enrollment options for students. The school has about 150 staff members and over 100 teachers. As of 2026, Pasco eSchool has a total of 1,480 students in the school's full-time K–12 program. The school is funded by the Pasco County School District and the State of Florida. Pasco eSchool offers Advanced Placement (AP) courses and dual enrollment by cooperating with local colleges around the county.

Pasco eSchool is accredited by the SACS-CASI and Advanced ED organizations. It operates on a 180-day school year.

== History ==
=== Creation ===
Pasco eSchool was created by the Pasco County Schools on July 7, 2009, as a virtual alternative school franchise of Florida Virtual School. It was founded for the 2009–2010 school year, with the first student graduating class in 2010. The school was founded by former principal JoAnne Glenn. More than 1,000 students attended the school in its first year. Pasco eSchool first operated at portable classrooms in Mitchell Highschool, in Trinity, Florida and then later moved to offices at the district headquarters in Land O’Lakes.

=== Expansion ===
Pasco eSchool's passing rate in 2011 was the second highest in the state of Florida, with Pasco eSchool students the top performers in the county on the state’s algebra exit exam. In 2012, Pasco eSchool added a K–5 program instead of using contracted third-party systems because of low control over the systems to monitor the elementary students' progress. Pasco eSchool first hired two elementary teachers, expanding the school's staff, and creating its own elementary curriculum.

By 2014, Pasco eSchool had become one of Florida's largest online schools, with some teachers having over 500 students during the school year.

=== COVID–19 pandemic ===
Pasco eSchool, like other virtual schools, was one of the alternate schools for students instead of brick-and-mortar schools during the COVID-19 pandemic in the United States. The school was one of three school options (including mySchool Online, and brick and mortar) that the school district provided for students during the time period. In 2021, it was one of two options without mySchool Online.

Student enrollment increased by 2,807 students in 2020, and by 2021, about 3% of all children in the school district were enrolled in Pasco eSchool.

=== Former campus ===
Pasco eSchool was based in a fringe rural setting, on the campus of Crews Lake Middle School in Spring Hill, Florida. The virtual school relocated to the newly built Angeline Academy of Innovation in 2023.

=== Past closure risk ===
In 2022, a proposal by politician Randy Fine was made to remove all Florida Virtual School district franchises, including Pasco eSchool, questioning their affordably to run. It was contradicted by former Pasco eSchool principal JoAnne Glenn, stating that districts would have had to offer fewer courses, would raise the cost per student, and enroll students in the larger, statewide program.

As of 2026, Pasco eSchool and other district franchises of Florida Virtual School stayed and were not removed, letting Florida school agree with FLVS to create their own franchises.

== Campus ==
Since 2023, Pasco eSchool's office has been situated on the school campus of Angeline Academy of Innovation. The school administers Florida state testing from the classrooms in Angeline Academy. Pasco eSchool also uses the rooms for provide additional support to students, hold virtual instruction periods, provide offices for teachers, and host occasional in-person visits. High school students have their own in-person events, like learning labs at school.

== Staff ==
Pasco eSchool has approximately 150 staff members working in various sectors and positions.

=== Principals ===
As of 2026, Pasco eSchool has had three principals. Lori Wiggins is the current principal and has served as the position since 2024. JoAnne Glenn, the school's founder, was also its first principal.

=== Teachers ===
Between 2011 and 2018, the school grew from 3 to 66 teachers, with the largest percent increase of 14 teacher (+366.7%) increase in 2012 from the previous year. As of 2026, Pasco eSchool has about 123 virtual teachers, with a student–teacher ratio of 19:1. Teachers are employed locally from Pasco County, and at least 92% are certified.

== Students ==
=== Enrollment ===
Pasco eSchool has served students K–12 free of charge. At Pasco eSchool, students do their school work using digital devices at home, and can work at their own pace during flexible hours. Students may engage in contact with teachers and classmates during web-based class sessions. Pasco eSchool has a 28 day grace period for students to drop out.

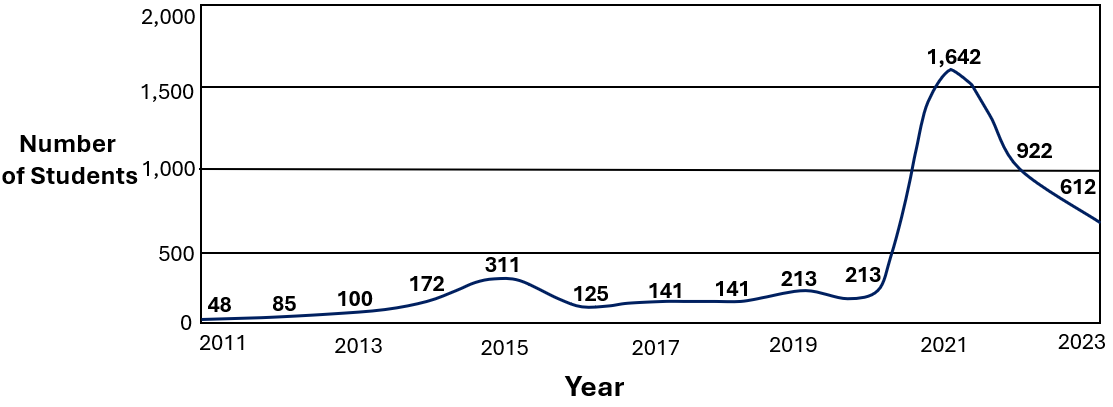
The graph of the enrollment of students in Pasco eSchool throughout the years in 6–12

Pasco eSchool enrolls 1,480 full-time students yearly, serving students K–12. Pasco eSchool instructs 8,000 individual students both within and outside of Pasco County in total. It is the third-largest virtual school by number by student enrollment in Florida.

==== Enrollment programs ====
The school has a full-time and a part-time enrollment program. All K–12 students in Pasco eSchool full-time enrollment take all of their total six courses digitally at Pasco eSchool.

=== Academic performance ===
Pasco eSchool's students' academic performance is frequently evaluated through state assessments. For the 2025–2026 school year, the high school portion (grades 9–12) reported the following rates based on data from the 2023–2024 academic year: 50% in mathematics, 64% in reading, and 74% in science. The school's four-year graduation rate stood at 92%, with very low chronic absenteeism rates, ranging from 0.1% to 3.9% of students. In Spring 2025 state assessments, grade 8 students achieved proficiency rates in English Language Arts were similar to district averages. The school overall achieved a B letter grade for the 2024–2025 school year from the Florida Department of Education.

== Controversies ==
=== Testing remediation disputes ===
During the 2015 Florida Standards Assessments (FSA), Pasco County Schools, including virtual programs like Pasco eSchool, enforced strict remediation requirements for students failing initial tests, which led to parent protests over "high-stakes" policies. Families argued that the district's refusal to accept alternative evidence of proficiency disproportionately affected online students, contributing to a broader issue that delayed promotions and increased dropout risks. The Florida Department of Education later adjusted guidelines amid backlash.

=== Competition with Florida Virtual School and enrollment decline ===
Pasco eSchool has faced ongoing challenges from competition with the state-run Florida Virtual School (FLVS), leading to enrollment declines and funding losses for the district. In the 2023–2024 school year, Pasco eSchool's enrollment dropped by approximately 1,200 students, resulting in a $5 million shortfall in state funding, as parents opted for FLVS due to perceived flexibility and fewer restrictions. District officials responded by launching aggressive marketing campaigns, including emails and calls to parents highlighting FLVS's "inferior" quality and emphasizing eSchool's local support, though media outlets argued this bordered on misleading tactics.

== Awards and recognitions ==
During the 2017–18 school year (Pasco eSchool's 10th year open), Pasco eSchool was awarded the Florida Virtual School Franchise of the Year among larger district franchises.

== Funding ==
Pasco eSchool is funded by the Pasco County School Board since 2009. The school also receives state funding from Florida, which is contingent upon student learning success.

== Courses ==
=== Curriculum ===
Each course at Pasco eSchool is completed digitally and is designed to be finished by students in 18 weeks or less. Courses can be completed at the student's own pace. Pasco eSchool offers the same courses as Florida Virtual School, though it has 50 more elective, career, and technical courses. The school has more course options than any other learning program in the State of Florida.

In July 2012, Pasco eSchool became the first virtual school in the United States to develop its own elective American Sign Language course.

=== Advanced courses ===
The school offers several Advanced Placement (AP) courses for high school students. The AP participation rate is 32%. There are a total of 23 Advanced Placement courses at Pasco eSchool. Pasco eSchool also has an Accelerated Math program for gifted students.

==== Dual enrollment and Cambridge® courses ====
Pasco eSchool offers dual enrollment college courses through partnerships with Pasco–Hernando State College and the University of South Florida. The dual enrollment participation rate is 4% of students enrolled in grades 9–12. In spring 2025, Pasco eSchool began a dual enrollment collaboration with Zephyrhills High School. The school also uses the Cambridge International curriculum. In 2025, Pasco eSchool expanded its dual enrollment courses through a renewed agreement with Pasco-Hernando State College, mainly viewing virtual delivery and integration with high school campuses.

== See also ==
- Education in Florida
- List of online high schools in Florida
- List of school districts in Florida
