= EducationCity (software company) =

British education software company

EducationCity.com
- Type: Private Limited Company
- Industry: Educational software
- Founded: February 11, 1999; 27 years ago
- Founder: Matt Drakard; Simon Booley
- Defunct: August 31, 2025; 14 months ago
- Headquarters: Oakham, Rutland, United Kingdom
- Key people: Richard Whalley, MD; Graham Lyden, TD; Phil Barker, FD
- Parent: Edmentum
- Website: educationcity.com

EducationCity (also referred to as EducationCity.com) was a United Kingdom software company, providing educational softwares to schools and homes, although said service has since been discontinued by its parent company, Edmentum, as of August 2025. The elearning service was originally founded in 1999. The company stated that their site had over 15,500 schools and 8,000 families registered. The service provided educational learning experiences mapped to the National Curriculum in English, Mathematics, Science, language education and computing. The company had won awards, was a BETT and ERA finalist and had been reviewed by the Times Educational Supplement a number of times.

In April 2010, EducationCity.com became one of the first ICT content providers to receive accreditation by South West Grid for Learning (SWGfL) Merlin for the integration of the resource into the Merlin Learning platform through the use of Shibboleth and the Systems Interoperability Framework (SIF) .

On 16 May 2011, the site had an Alexa rating of 78,987. EducationCity.com launched a new module, Learn English to address English as an Additional Language (English language learning and teaching) needs in primary school.

At some point, EducationCity had offices in Rutland, UK and Naperville, US - though after the shutdown of their services, it is unclear whether this is still the case.

== History ==
In June 2010, Archipelago Learning (Nasdaq: ARCL), acquired EducationCity.com. EducationCity was planned to remain a stand-alone business unit of Archipelago. Its headquarters were to remain in Rutland, U.K. and Naperville, IL.

On 1st August 2025, EducationCity was retired. All user and teacher data was deleted, all contracts were terminated, and access to the software was completely removed. All pre-existing blog posts and links to anywhere within the website now redirect to the parent company Edmentum's website, at edmentum.com . Schools and users were given some time to download any worksheets or videos from the site, but, from that date onward, the software ceased to exist. Furthermore, the parent company's FAQ made it clear that they no longer wish to provide UK-aligned education software.
