= Edmentum =

American online learning software

- Type: Private
- Industry: Educational software
- Founded: 21 April 2000; 26 years ago
- Founders: David Muzzo; Cameron Chalmers
- Headquarters: Bloomington, Minnesota, U.S.
- Key people: Tim McEwen, CEO; Mark Dubrow, CFO
- Products: Study Island; EducationCity.com; ESL ReadingSmart; Apex Learning
- Owner: The Vistria Group, New Mountain Finance Corporation, BlackRock
- Website: https://www.edmentum.com/

Edmentum is an American online learning provider and owner of Reading Eggs internationally.

Founded in 2000 as Archipelago Learning, the company is headquartered in Bloomington, Minnesota, and is a publicly held company with the largest shareholder being Providence Equity Partners, a media-focused private equity firm. The company went public in November 2009 under the ticker (Nasdaq: ARCL). On 17 May 2012, PLATO Learning acquired Archipelago Learning in an all-cash deal valued at $291 million. As a result, the stock was delisted.

== History ==
Study Island was founded in May 2000 by Cam Chalmers and Dave Muzzo, originally providing tools related to the Ohio Proficiency Test Program. By 2002, Study Island had expanded to four states, Ohio, North Carolina, New York, and Michigan, and serviced 180 schools. Continuing its rapid growth plan, Study Island, which moved its offices to Dallas, Texas added six states in 2003 and expanded its coverage to 750 schools.

In January 2007, Providence Equity Partners and MHT Partners together with co-founders Cameron Chalmers and David Muzzo completed a recapitalization of Study Island in which Archipelago Learning was created to acquire 100% of the outstanding shares of Study Island.

In October 2009, it launched in Canada.

In November 2009, Archipelago Learning launched a $75 million initial public offering on the NASDAQ under the symbol "ARCL". It also sold TeacherWeb in November 2009.

In June 2010, it bought EducationCity expanding the company's school count and portfolio of products in the United States and providing an entry point into the U.K. The company entered into a distribution agreement with Blake Publishing to distribute Reading Eggs in the United States and Canada.

In 2011, they acquired Alloy Multimedia, the publisher of ESL ReadingSmart, an English language learning program.

On 17 May 2012, Archipelago Learning was purchased by PLATO Learning (Now Edmentum, Inc) at the price of US$11.10 per share.

Edmentum acquired Apex Learning in 2021.

The Vistria Group acquired majority ownership of Edmentum in 2020.

== User-Reported Technical and Usability Issues ==
Feedback from educators highlights significant challenges with the platform's design and reliability. In a survey of adult education users, common descriptors for Edmentum were "difficult " and "not user friendly." One user commented, "It could be difficult to find material that worked well for our students/program. It did not feel user friendly". Furthermore, an independent outage tracker has recorded at least 29 incidents of service disruption for Edmentum Courseware since 2021, with users frequently reporting login failures and "Bad Gateway" errors that prevent students from accessing their assignments.
