= Pennsylvania Virtual Charter School =

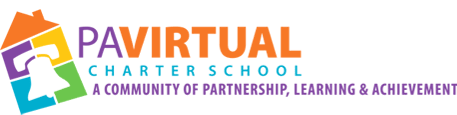

Location
- 630 Park Avenue; King of Prussia, Pennsylvania 19406; United States

Information
- Type: Public virtual charter school
- Founded: June 2001
- CEO: Dr. Debra Heath-Thornton
- Staff: 35 non-teaching staff (2013)
- Teaching staff: 81 teachers
- Grades: K-12
- Enrollment: 2,959 pupils
- Website: www.pavcsk12.org

The Pennsylvania Virtual Charter School (abbreviated as PAVCS) is a public virtual charter school, with its headquarters located at 630 Park Avenue, King of Prussia, Pennsylvania, in the United States.

In 2015, enrollment was reported as 2,482 pupils in kindergarten through 12th grades. Cyber charter schools enroll many homeschooled students and also children with special needs, who are taught remotely via computer. The school is one of the 14 public, cyber charter schools operating in Pennsylvania in 2015. PA Virtual Charter School is a federally designated Title I school.

The Montgomery County Intermediate Unit IU23 provides the school with a wide variety of services like specialized education for disabled students and hearing, background checks for employees, state mandated recognizing and reporting child abuse training, speech and visual disability services and criminal background check processing for prospective employees and professional development for staff and faculty.

== Background ==
PAVCS was approved by the Pennsylvania Department of Education (PDE) in 2001 and then renewed in 2005 for an additional five years. The Charter will be up for renewal by the Pennsylvania Department of Education, in 2016.

Initially serving kindergarten through 2nd grade, as of 2015, it serves kindergarten through 12th grade.
