= Odyssey Online Learning =

Odyssey Online Learning is a free public online high school. The school is part of the charter school district, The Charter Institute at Erskine. It was formerly known as Provost Academy South Carolina (PASC). Odyssey Online Learning has served students throughout the state of South Carolina in grades 9-12 since 2009. The headquarters of Odyssey Online Learning is located in Chapin, South Carolina.

== Administration ==
As of 2020, the executive director of Odyssey Online Learning was Ashley Owings.

== Notable alumni ==
- Maile O'Keefe, artistic gymnast
