= Apex Learning =

Privately held provider of e-Learning software for K-12 education

- Type: Subsidiary
- Industry: Educational Software
- Founded: 1997
- Founder: Paul Allen
- Headquarters: Seattle, Washington, United States
- Key people: Chris Porter, CEO
- Products: Online courses and tutorials
- Parent: Edmentum
- Website: www.apexlearning.com

Apex Learning, Inc. is a privately held provider of digital curriculum. Headquartered in Seattle, Apex Learning is accredited by AdvancED.

== History ==
Microsoft co-founder Paul Allen founded Apex Learning in 1997 for the purpose of applying for online courses and test prep material in grades 6–12. The company initially focused on Advanced Placement courses and test prep. Within one year of operation, 200 students used the Apex platform.

In 2002, Cheryl Vedoe, founder of Tenth Planet and VP of Education Marketing at Apple Inc., became CEO of Apex. In 2003, Apex Learning acquired Beyond Books and Boxer Math. In 2006, Apex had a $6 million round of venture capital financing led by MK Capital.

In May 2017, Apex Learning was acquired by Education Growth Partners; however, the terms of the acquisition were not disclosed. The following August, Apex Learning released Tutorials for the General Education Development (GED), High School Equivalency Test (HiSET), and Test Assessing Secondary Completion (TASC) exams. Since 2015, Apex has been approved by the College Board for Advanced Placement courses.

Edmentum acquired Apex Learning in 2021.

== Controversies ==
The Alameda County Civil Grand Jury released a report in 2020 that questioned the use of Apex in Castlemont High School in Oakland, CA. It is suggested that Apex's online curriculum was used improperly to graduate students who should not have graduated.

== See also ==
- Virtual learning environment
- Learning management system
