= Virtual school libraries in the United States =

A virtual school library is a PreK-12 library that is a subunit of a virtual school—using the same telecommunications network to provide equitable access to electronic resources and communication designed to support the school's curriculum.

According to Watson and Ryan, PreK-12 virtual school enrollments in the United States were growing at a rate of 50% annually in 2007.

Additionally, Darrow cites the development of virtual spaces, which have been developed in the traditional school library across the United States, as the models for the newly developed virtual school library concept. He identifies how such existing sites as "Kathy Scrhock's Guide for educators", the Springfield Township High School Virtual Library, and the Wissahickon High School Virtual Library which have been modeled to create PreK-12 virtual school libraries such as the Florida Virtual School Virtual Library. Other similar libraries include Stephanie Bucalo's "Virtual School Library", designed to address general literacy and inquiry-based learning by highlighting books, information sources (search engines, etc.) and information/evaluation best practices and strategies and Linda Bertland's "Virtual Middle School Library", a collection of online resources, book reviews, parent/teacher resources and teacher-librarian information targeted specifically to the U.S. middle school population.

Furthermore, Darrow also cites the need to have licensed teacher-librarians involved at several levels—instruction, inquiry, and curriculum development—in order to effectively utilize the wealth of resources (and their associated processes) available to virtual education students. According to Darrow, if a virtual school library is void of such "customization and personalization" as well as other degrees of human intervention, the resources may prove to be under-utilized or not used at all.

One of the key components in the virtual school library is the development of virtual school library communication portals where students may interact with teacher-librarians and other educators—sharing student/educator-generated book reviews, student/educator-produced videos, participate in online polls, and/or attend online reference service podcasts designed to teach students how to use a particular library database or tool. Loertscher confirms Darrow's assumptions and describes a process that goes beyond merely integrating online tools on a website. He describes the idea and functionality of a "virtual school library commons" during a Second Life presentation where he created an iGoogle page and an accompanying blog to facilitate the delivery of RRS (i.e. z/OS)-based library services to students and fellow educators.
