= Florida Virtual School =

American online public high school

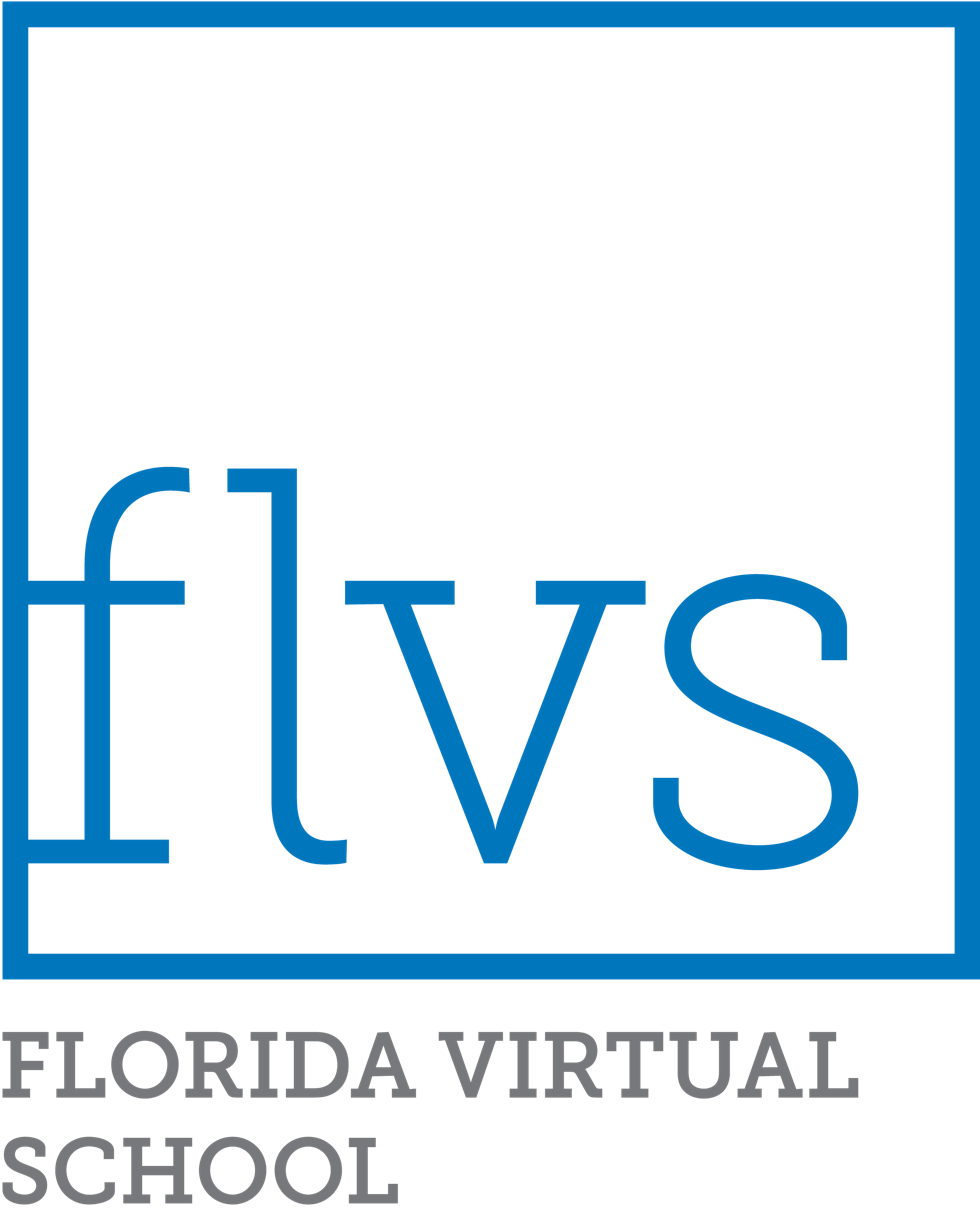

Location
- 5422 Carrier Drive, Suite 201; Orlando, Orange, FL 32819; United States; 28.519°N 81.467°W 28.519°N 81.467°W

Information
- School type: Public
- Established: 1997; 29 years ago
- Founder: Julie Young
- Administrator: Louis Algaze (CEO)
- Grades: K–12
- Accreditation: AdvancED; Southern Association of Colleges and Schools (SACS CASI); North Central Association (NCA CASI); Northwest Accreditation Commission (NWAC)
- Website: www.flvs.net

Florida Virtual School (FLVS) is an online K–12 school, primarily operating in the state of Florida. FLVS was founded in 1997 as the first statewide Internet-based public high school in the United States. In 2000, FLVS was established as an independent educational entity by the Florida Legislature. Recognized as its own district within the state, it now provides online instruction to Florida students from kindergarten through 12th grade in all 67 Florida districts.

== History ==
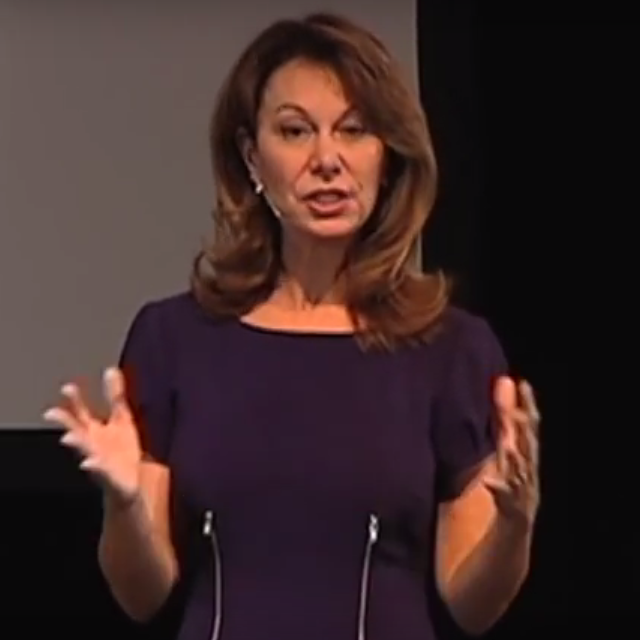
Julie Young, founder of FLVS

Florida Virtual School began as an initiative that sought to explore teaching models involving online learning. During the 1996 school year, the Florida Department of Education awarded Orange and Alachua counties with $200,000 in "Break the Mold" grant funds. After a 6-month planning period, the school launched in August 1997 with 77 students.

Julie Young was hired to head the project, having previously worked as an administrator and technology integration trainer in the Florida education system. FLVS became an independent educational entity in 2000. During its first few years following the receipt of its initial grant funding, it was funded as a line item in the state budget.

By 2003, the school had increased to 24,000 half-credit enrollments (considered one segment or semester) and became part of the Florida Education Finance Program (FEFP). It was the first school to directly tie student performance to funding through the reporting of students' successful half-credit completions. During the 2012–2013 year, FLVS had 410,962 successful half-credit, semester completions based on part-time students. In 2012–2013, FLVS licensed digital curriculum and provided online learning services to 47 Florida districts.

FLVS is currently affiliated with all 67 Florida school districts.

== Programs ==
=== FLVS Flex ===
Within the state of Florida in America as in the United States of, the Florida Virtual School district offers multiple options at no cost to students who are Florida residents. FLVS Flex allows public, private, or homeschool students to enroll on a per-course basis with rolling enrollment open year-round. Because credits are applied to the transcript of a student's local school or toward a homeschool portfolio, students of the FLVS Flex program do not receive a diploma from FLVS. The FLVS course catalog includes more than 190 courses for students in Kindergarten through 12th grade.

FLVS is accredited by the North Central Association Commission on Accreditation and School Improvement (NCA CASI), Northwest Accreditation Commission (NWAC) and the Southern Association of Colleges and Schools Council on Accreditation and School Improvement (SACS CASI), a division of Cognia. All core courses are NCAA approved.

=== FLVS Full Time ===
FLVS Full Time is a full-time public school in the state of Florida that provides online instruction for both elementary, middle and high school students. FLVS Full Time operates on a 180-day calendar following the traditional school year in the United States and is considered attending students' primary school of record. In May 2013, the school celebrated the graduation of its inaugural graduating class which included 250 high school seniors. These students were the first to receive a diploma from FLVS Full Time.

=== Global School ===
Outside the state of Florida, students and parents can take individual elementary, middle, and high school courses by paying tuition through Global School.

=== Other services ===
FLVS is a contracted provider for schools and districts across the United States. This includes 67 Florida school districts, supporting county virtual schools which use FLVS curriculum taught by their local district teachers.

== Funding ==
Funded through the Florida Education Finance Program (FEFP), full-time equivalent (FTE) students at FLVS are defined by course completion and performance – as opposed to "seat time" in a traditional brick-and-mortar school.

During the spring of 2013, a new legislative funding model changed the FTE allotment received by FLVS for students who attend a brick-and-mortar public school. The new funding formula provides FLVS a portion of the FTE for each public school student and is dependent upon the number of online courses taken. Previously, districts received the full allotment for each student regardless of the number of online courses taken and FLVS received an additional per-course allotment that equaled one-sixth of the FEFP FTE funding. Under the 2013 funding model, FLVS receives one-seventh of the allotment and the district receives six-sevenths if a student takes six courses with their local school and one course online. This is further reduced and divided by the total number of online courses taken. Funding for homeschool and private school students, however, remain the same. FLVS receives less funding for students who take courses through a district franchises. In 2012–2013, the FLVS funding per FTE was $5,195.18.

== Legal ==
FLVS operates under the guidance of a gubernatorial-appointed Board of Trustees according to Florida Statute (s. 228.082, F.S.).

Florida statute 1003.428 requires all high school students to complete an online course prior to graduation. All Florida students are eligible to take online courses with FLVS and cannot be denied this option by their district per Section 1002.37(3)(c), F.S.

In 2023 FLVS was sued for title IX violations by a former teacher at the school who was fired for using the title "Mx." The school maintains the firing was required as per Florida's "Don't Say Gay" law.

== Notable alumni ==
- Sam Riffice (2017), tennis player
- Daniella Ramirez (2019), synchronized swimmer, Olympic Silver Medalist
- Jahlane Forbes (2020), MLS soccer player
- Coco Gauff (2022), tennis player, Olympics flag bearer
- Alexa Pano (2022), LPGA Tour golfer

== See also ==
- Educational technology
- Blended learning
- Learning management system
- List of virtual schools
- History of virtual learning environments
- School choice in Florida
