= New Port Richey Public Library =

Library in New Port Richey, Florida

Coordinates: 28°15′1″N 82°42′56″W

- Location: 5939 Main Street; New Port Richey, Florida, United States
- Type: Public
- Established: 1920

Other information
- Website: www.nprlibrary.org

The New Port Richey Public Library is a public library in New Port Richey, Florida. The library is the only public library in Pasco County that is not a member of the Pasco County Library Cooperative

== History ==
The library was founded by Elroy M. Avery as the Avery Library and Historical Society. The charters and papers of incorporation were created on December 22, 1919; the Avery Library and Historical Society formally opened within the Snell building with a collection of approximately 2,000 volumes on April 10, 1920. The Scofield Bible (a personal copy of Avery's) was the first book cataloged in the library. In 1924, Avery also published a local history text, "The Genesis of New Port Richey," to be included in the library's collection. Originally, the library charged patrons $1 a year for borrowing privileges. In the 1960s, the library was renamed to reflect the change of ownership to New Port Richey and the usage fee was dropped.

The first Chasco Fiesta held on March 2–4, 1922, was an early source of funding and was provided by the Friends of the Library, previously The Library Associates. It was then in 1924 that the library moved to the Sims building "for increased protection from fire" followed by a move the next year to the Morey-Bowman building. In 1963, with a new library construction being built on Main and Jefferson, the library was voted to be named the New Port Richey Public Library. Finally, in 1987, an expansion for City Hall and the library were approved with the grand opening of its current location occurring in early 1991. During this phase of expansion, the old library building at Jefferson and Main was turned into City Hall, while the library moved into the lot next door, which was previously a school.

In May 2013, the library opened a short lived second location, dubbed the Avery branch, in the newly renovated Elfers CARES Center. NJROTC students from Gulf High School assisted in the set up. This branch is no longer in operation.

In October 2020, the library commemorated its hundred-year anniversary with a 1920s themed gala and a special edition library card with a black-and-white image of the library printed on the front of each card. Following the centennial, the library undertook a more than $2 million renovation as a part of the facility improvements included in the library's 2017–2022 Long Range Plan. This renovation was a complete remodeling of the building's interior, improving both floors of the library with the inclusion of private study rooms, programming and conference rooms, and a more open floor plan for the children's department on the second floor. Solar panels were also installed on the libraries roof during the renovation, funded by EBSCO Industries with New Port Richey Public library being one of three recipients of the company's 2019 Solar Grant. It took roughly nine months to complete the renovation, from March 2021 to January 2022, during which time the library pledged to stay open to patrons as much as possible, and was only closed for five days. The rededication ceremony for the library's upgraded facilities took place in June 2022, featuring the dedication of a time capsule set to be opened in 2050, and a ceremonial ribbon cutting.

== Friends of the library ==
=== History ===
On October 19, 1964, the New Port Richey Public Library held a meeting to discuss the organization of the Friends of the Library group. An active member of the Tarpon Springs Friends of the Library named Mrs. Henry Rolfe attended to explain the mission and the function of the group to potential participants. She said, "We try to meet the needs of the library which cannot be provided by the budget." Here, the group appointed a nominating committee consisting of Mrs. William Froelig, Mrs. Richard Cooper, and librarian Mrs. Barbara Clark. Clark stated that some services which could be accomplished through the efforts of the Friends of the Library were a story-telling group, puppet shows, book discussion groups, posters and publicity, and typing assistance. About forty people attended this meeting.

One week later on October 26, 1964, officers were elected to serve the new organization. Richard Williams was elected president, Robert Kolean as vice president, Estelle Garner as secretary, and Louise Geiger as treasurer. The fledgling Friends of the New Port Richey Public Library group was assembled.

One of their first fundraisers was the Poinsettia Tea gala held on December 13, 1964 at the New Port Richey Public Library. It was "pronounced a success" by the St. Petersburg Times. The first program the Friends presented was a talk titled The Public Library – Matrix of the Fine Arts featuring Robert Spencer Carr, an author, writing professor from the University of South Florida, and former director of research at Walt Disney Studios.

== Current services and programming ==
In addition to lending of its material holdings, the New Port Richey Public Library offers many programs and services for the community. The library works with several local organizations and groups in the community, including the West Pasco Historical Society, which was founded in the 1970s with the support of then-director, Janet Lewis. The New Port Richey Public Library is fine free.

=== Adult programs and services ===
Due to the Covid-19 pandemic and the library's renovation in 2021, some of the library's regular programming was put on hiatus. Former programming included several language groups, a writer's group, technology classes, and chair yoga. Notably, the library previously hosted a weekly French language conversation group during which French speakers would gather for casual conversation and to improve their use of the language. As of 2022, former programs were beginning to return, including Guten Tag German Language class and Qigong guided meditation, along with new programs. The library has also hosted musical events; in 2013, guitarist Ana Vidovic played at the library, and in May 2022, the library hosted musician Sofia Talvik. In addition, in 2022, New Port Richey Public library received funding from the Florida Humanities Council for two sessions of a ten week English For Families course. In 2022, New Port Richey Public Library was also a participant in the Career Online High School program administered by the State of Florida. To encourage reading and library usage, the library hosts several reading challenges throughout the year for children, teens and adults.

For over eight years, the library celebrated its Reel Pride LGBT Film Series. In addition to Reel Pride, the New Port Richey Public Library has also held film festivals emphasizing human rights. In 2005, the library participated in the Human Rights Video Project, an ALA-sponsored film series made up of 13 documentaries focusing on human rights. In 2019, the library hosted Drag Queen StoryTimes.

The library has increased the variety of its holdings through the addition of an adult graphic novel collection. The library also offers a circulating art collection, called Art on the Move.

As part of the American Heart Association's "Libraries with Heart" initiative, the New Port Richey Public Library is also home to a Higi Station, where patrons can complete free health assessments of measures like weight, body mass index (BMI), pulse, and blood pressure. This initiative has also led to the addition of blood pressure kits to the library's collection, which are free to check out with a library card. The kits include a sphygmomanometer, informational diagrams on how to read results, and additional cardiac health resources.

New Port Richey Public Library has hosted a variety of food related programming, including a 2019 Urban Food Sovereignty Mini Summit, and cooking classes featuring Chef Warren, who returned to the library for events in 2022 following Covid-19 and the renovation.

In late summer, the New Port Richey Public Library also hosts an annual program called "Okra Occasion," where attention is brought to "one of Florida's forgotten summer vegetable treasures." This program is held in conjunction with New Port Richey FarmNet, the Environmental Committee of New Port Richey, and the Rotary Club of New Port Richey. The Occasion features tastings of several okra-centered dishes, with awards being given to recipes as voted by attendees.

=== Tasty Tuesdays and Community Garden ===
A weekly organic farmers' market, known as Tasty Tuesdays, has been held in the library courtyard since 2012. Local growers come to lay out their harvest as a part of the urban gardening movement that has spread throughout the country. The library also hosts Master Gardener events in conjunction with Tasty Tuesday, administered through the University of Florida's IFAS extension, including Earth Day events and a lecture series.

In conjunction with this effort, the library created a seed library in August 2013, through which patrons can check out seeds like they would books. This trend caught on in neighboring libraries, with Dunedin Public Library launching its own seed library within a couple of months. The seed library (The Seed Exchange Library) is a special collection of organic, non-GMO seeds that provides patrons with resources to practice sustainability and growing wholesome food. After taking packets of seed from the library, patrons have the option to harvest their own seed and then donate the seeds back to the library for others to take and attempt to grow.

In the Spring of 2025, the New Port Richey Public Library received a grant from the Seeds of Knowledge Library Demonstration Garden Grant Program. This grant program is organized and supported by the Florida Wildflower Foundation. The New Port Richey Public Library was one of six libraries located in Florida selected in 2025 to participate in the Seeds of Knowledge Demonstration Garden Grant Program. The New Port Richey Public Library staff and administration coordinated to work with members from the Master Gardeners group and other volunteers in the local community to plant a native garden in front of the New Port Richey Public Library and City Hall. Florida native wildflower seeds were chosen and provided by the Florida Wildflower Foundation. In addition to the grant, the seeds were sent to be incorporated into The Seed Exchange Library collection. The wildflower seeds serve as a resource for helping the community plant more native and to support urban gardens. The native garden is an educational experience for library users to engage with plants that occur in Florida’s ecosystems and to educate the importance of native gardens to create habitat restoration and reserve natural resources.

=== Teen and children's programming ===
The library has made many efforts to engage its youth patrons. In an effort to keep up with digital trends, the library celebrated International TableTop Day with board games and video games geared toward teenage patrons. The library has offered chocolate-making classes for both children and teens as well. The library formerly had a teen advisory board known as YOLO (Youth Offering Library Opinions), which participated in the 2013 Cotee River Cleanup. The teens continued their work during the Cotee River Clean Up by beautifying the Gene Sarazen Overlook Tower as a community works project. In addition to community service projects, YOLO members volunteered to help out at library events like Pi Day.

The library offers weekly story times and children's yoga classes, as well as various other programs and events, including an annual reptile show, a visit from the SPCA Suncoast animal shelter, and other education and entertaining presenters. In addition, the library has a permanent StoryWalk at the James E. Grey Preserve for children and families to explore a book in the outdoors; the book and its accompanying activities that the StoryWalk centers on is changed quarterly.

The library also takes part in the annual Reading with the Rays summer reading program, in partnership with the Tampa Bay Rays.

== Awards ==
New Port Richey Public Library is one of the founding members of the Florida Library Association. In 2006, the library was honored as the first recipient of the FLA's "Library of the Year" award. The library is also one of the original members of the Tampa Bay Library Consortium, which it is still participates in to build connections between and with other area libraries.

Library Journal gave the New Port Richey Public Library a rating of 4 out of 5 stars in 2013. It was the only library in the state to earn a rating from Library Journal that year. In 2016, it made the Library Journal Index again with a 5-star rating, the highest-ranked in the state and one of only three Florida libraries to make the list.

In 2014, the Florida Library Association awarded library director Susan Dillinger with the Librarian of the Year Award. In 2017 the Florida Library Association awarded Library Director Susan Dillinger with the Lifetime Achievement Award. In 2012, Dillinger was appointed as the interim city manager for New Port Richey. In honor of her service in this role for almost two years, an art exhibition wall in City Hall was named the Susan Dillinger Art Gallery.
