= Chuck Pitcock =

American football player (1958–2016)

No. 64, 55
- Position: Center

Personal information
- Born: February 20, 1958; Homestead, Florida, U.S.
- Died: January 11, 2016 (aged 57); New Port Richey, Florida, U.S.
- Listed height: 6 ft 4 in (1.93 m)
- Listed weight: 272 lb (123 kg)

Career information
- High school: Gulf
- College: Tulane
- NFL draft: 1981: undrafted

Career history
- Philadelphia Eagles (1981)*; Los Angeles Rams (1982)*; Los Angeles Express (1983); Tampa Bay Bandits (1984-1985); New Orleans Saints (1985); Tampa Bay Buccaneers (1987)
- * Offseason or practice squad member only

Career NFL statistics
- Games played: 2
- Games started: 2
- Stats at Pro Football Reference

Charles Clayton Pitcock Jr. (February 20, 1958 – January 11, 2016) was a National Football League (NFL) and United States Football League (USFL) center and guard who played for both the Tampa Bay Bandits and the Tampa Bay Buccaneers in the 1980s. He was known as "the wild man" when he played for the Bandits because of his extremely passionate play. He was interviewed by award-winning director Mike Tollin for the film Small Potatoes: Who Killed The USFL?, a part of ESPN's 30 for 30 film series. Pitcock was a graduate of Gulf High School in 1976, where he was coached by Kevin White, former athletic director at Duke University. He died in 2016 at the age of 57.
