= Hudson, Florida =

- CDP
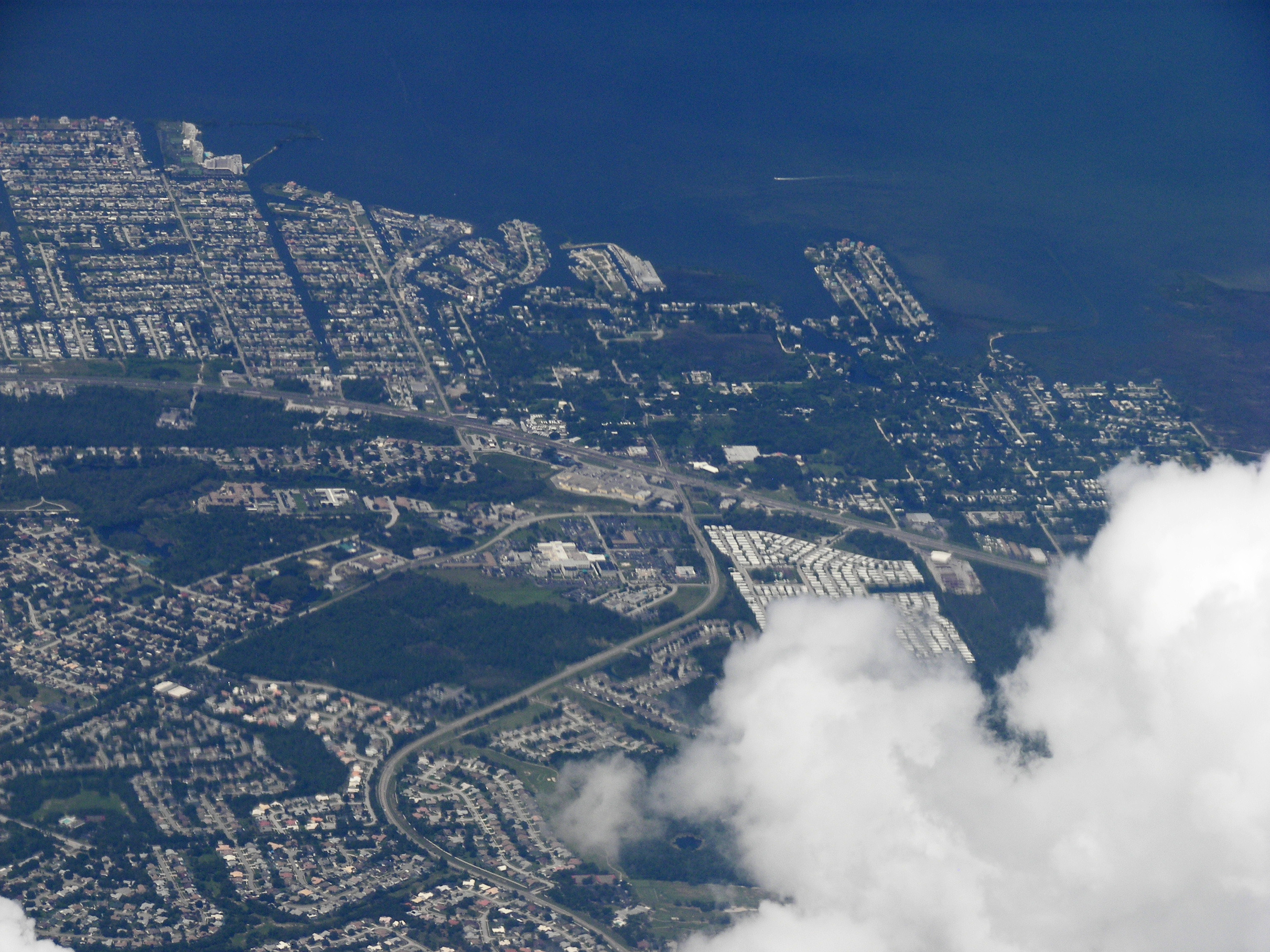
- Aerial view of Hudson and Hudson Beach, Florida
- Interactive map of Hudson, Florida
- Location within Florida Location within the United States
- Coordinates: 28°21′40″N 82°41′14″W
- Country: United States
- State: Florida
- County: Pasco
- Established: 1882
- Named for: Isaac Hudson

Area
  - Total: 6.37 sq mi (16.49 km^{2})
  - Land: 6.35 sq mi (16.44 km^{2})
  - Water: 0.015 sq mi (0.04 km^{2}) 1.27%
- Elevation: 7 ft (2.1 m)

Population (2020)
  - Total: 12,944
  - Density: 2,039/sq mi (787.2/km^{2})
- Time zone: UTC-5 (Eastern (EST))
  - Summer (DST): UTC-4 (EDT)
- ZIP codes: 34667, 34669, 34674
- Area code: 727
- FIPS code: 12-32825
- GNIS feature ID: 2402602
- Website: www.hudsonfla.com

Hudson is a census-designated place (CDP) located at the westernmost end of Pasco County, Florida, United States, and is included in the Tampa-St. Petersburg-Clearwater, Florida Metropolitan Statistical Area. As of the 2020 census, Hudson's population was 12,944.

== History ==
In 1878, Isaac Hudson moved his family to the uninhabited brush of coastal Pasco County and allowed a post office to be established in his home. The town grew in the early twentieth century when the Fivay Company began cutting lumber and shipping it by rail to Tampa. Hudson stagnated when the Fivay Company went out of business in 1912 and people turned to the sea or moved away; shrimping and fishing employed about half of the working men in the 1930s to 1950s.

W.L. Hendry came with his sons from Tampa and began digging inlets from the coast around Hudson Springs, using the fill to create a higher ground to put a few houses on in 1950. This was to become the Port of Hudson neighborhood. In the 1980s, people began building larger homes (most of which were mobile homes) along the canals. Now, while its older waterfront is reviving, large residential developments are spreading inland.

Bayonet Point Hospital, located in Hudson Florida, is the areas local hospital. Founded in 1981, it was the first hospital to be built in North West Pasco County serving residents in Pasco, Hernando and Citrus counties.

== Geography ==
According to the United States Census Bureau, Hudson has a total area of 6.4 square miles (17 km^{2}), of which 6.4 square miles (17 km^{2}) is land and 0.04 square miles (0.10 km^{2}) (0.31%) is water.

=== Climate ===
Hudson has a humid subtropical climate (Cfa) with hot summers and cool winters.

Hudson's sea-level elevation and position next to the Gulf of Mexico shape its climate. The average temperature in Hudson can range from 60.3 °F (15.7 °C) in the winter to 80.7 °F (27.1 °C) in the summer.

Climate data for Hudson, Florida
Month	Jan	Feb	Mar	Apr	May	Jun	Jul	Aug	Sep	Oct	Nov	Dec	Year
Mean daily maximum °F (°C)	69 (21)	71 (22)	75 (24)	79 (26)	85 (29)	88 (31)	89 (32)	89 (32)	88 (31)	83 (28)	76 (24)	71 (22)	80.25 (26.81)
Daily mean °F (°C)	59 (15)	61 (16)	65 (18)	70 (21)	76 (24)	80 (27)	81 (27)	81 (27)	80 (27)	74 (23)	67 (19)	61 (16)	71.25 (21.81)
Mean daily minimum °F (°C)	51 (11)	53 (12)	57 (14)	61 (16)	67 (19)	73 (23)	75 (24)	75 (24)	73 (23)	67 (19)	59 (15)	54 (12)	63.75 (17.64)
Average precipitation inches (mm)	2.8 (71)	2.9 (74)	3.2 (81)	2.3 (58)	2.6 (66)	5.7 (140)	6.8 (170)	6.9 (180)	5.5 (140)	2.5 (64)	1.8 (46)	2.2 (56)	45.3 (1,150)
Average precipitation days (≥ 0.01 in)	6.8	6.7	7.4	6.0	7.6	16.6	21.5	20.7	14.0	7.0	4.7	5.4	124.4

== Demographics ==
Historical population
Census	Pop.	Note	%±
2010	12,158		—
2020	12,944		6.5%
U.S. Decennial Census

=== 2020 census ===
As of the 2020 census, Hudson had a population of 12,944. The median age was 59.7 years. 10.5% of residents were under the age of 18 and 39.0% of residents were 65 years of age or older. For every 100 females there were 95.3 males, and for every 100 females age 18 and over there were 94.0 males age 18 and over.

99.9% of residents lived in urban areas, while 0.1% lived in rural areas.

There were 6,247 households in Hudson, of which 13.2% had children under the age of 18 living in them. Of all households, 44.8% were married-couple households, 20.4% were households with a male householder and no spouse or partner present, and 26.6% were households with a female householder and no spouse or partner present. About 34.0% of all households were made up of individuals and 20.6% had someone living alone who was 65 years of age or older.

There were 7,833 housing units, of which 20.2% were vacant. The homeowner vacancy rate was 4.1% and the rental vacancy rate was 12.1%.

Racial composition as of the 2020 census
Race	Number	Percent
White	11,209	86.6%
Black or African American	235	1.8%
American Indian and Alaska Native	56	0.4%
Asian	195	1.5%
Native Hawaiian and Other Pacific Islander	17	0.1%
Some other race	241	1.9%
Two or more races	991	7.7%
Hispanic or Latino (of any race)	1,072	8.3%

=== 2010 census ===
As of the census of 2010, there were 12,158 people, 5,816 households, and 3,466 families residing in Hudson. The population density was 2,005.3 inhabitants per square mile (774.3/km^{2}). There were 7,686 housing units, at an average density of 1,207.5/sq. mi. (465.9/km^{2}). The racial makeup was 96.87% White, 0.36% Black, 0.22% American Indian, 0.91% Asian, 0.03% Pacific Islander, 0.42% from other races, and 1.19% from two or more races. Hispanic or Latino of any race comprised 2.60% of the population.

There were 5,816 households, out of which 13.8% had children under the age of 18 living with them, 54.2% were married couples living together, 6.4% had a female householder with no husband present, and 36.2% were nonfamilies. 30.4% of all households were made up of individuals, and 19.0% had someone living alone who was 65 years of age or older. The average household size was 2.04, and the average family size was 2.47.

In Hudson, 12.9% of the population were under the age of 18, 4.0% from 18 to 24, 17.1% from 25 to 44, 27.4% from 45 to 64, and 38.6% who were 65 years of age or older; the median age was 57 years. For every 100 females, there were 93.3 males, and for every 100 women age 18 and over, there were 91.2 men.

The median income for a household in Hudson was $33,177, and the median income for a family was $39,708. Men had a median income of $30,688, versus $24,620 for women; the per capita income was $19,476. About 5.5% of families and 9.9% of the population were below the poverty line, including 12.3% of those under age 18 and 8.1% of those age 65 or over.

== Education ==
Hudson has 2 Elementary Schools, 2 Middle Schools, and 3 High Schools.

Elementary schools

- Hudson Academy (Grades 4-5)
- Hudson Primary Academy Grades (Grades K-5)

Middle schools

- Hudson Academy (Grades 6-8)
- West Pasco Education Academy - Harry Schwettman Campus (Grades 6-8)

High schools

- Fivay High School (Grades 9-12)
- Hudson High School (Grades 9-12)
- West Pasco Education Academy - Harry Schwettman Campus (Grades 9-12)

== Museums and libraries ==
- New Port Richey Public Library
- West Pasco Historical Society Museum and Library

== Parks and recreation ==
Robert J. Strickland Memorial Park (Hudson Beach) was built in the 1960s and is the main beach for the Hudson community. Several restaurants in the area offer water views of the gulf or adjacent canals.

Veterans Memorial Park and Arthur F. Engle Memorial Park are the main indoor and outdoor sports and recreation centers, with indoor gymnasiums, outdoor fields and an outdoor pool (at Veterans Memorial Park).

There are also three semiprivate golf courses: Beacon Woods Golf Club, Meadow Oaks Golf & Country Club, and Heritage Pines Country Club.

Hudson once proclaimed itself the "gopher racing capital of the world".

== Notable people ==
- Bam Bam Bigelow, professional Wrestler
- Velva Darnell, American country and pop singer
- Cody Lane, stock car racing driver
- Amber Mariano, politician and former Member of the Florida House of Representatives
- Marie Rudisill, writer and television personality
- Lindsay Zullo, footballer
