= Tru Vu Entertainment =

Tru Vu Entertainment was an entertainment company that streamed live programs via their website. All of the programming on the site was audience interactive. Each show was hosted by a person called a Cyber Jockey (CJ). Viewers would watch the CJs and communicate instantaneously with them via typed comments flashed on a monitor in a studio.

== History ==
=== IM2K ===
Tru Vu Entertainment initially began business in Nashville, Tennessee during October 1998 as IM2K (Internet Music 2000). The IM2K website was used as a beta test, and ran live for three weeks tallying more than 300,000 visits amongst viewers before the website was taken down and the studio was deconstructed.

=== RAVE2000 ===
The company relocated to Hudson, Florida and returned in October 2000 as RAVE2000 (Radio Audio Visual Entertainment). Starting with more than 200 CJs RAVE2000 debuted, as a live music channel that played all genres. After one year, around the same time as the end of the Dot-com bubble, the website was once again put to an end.

=== Tru Vu Entertainment ===
In July 2010 the company relocated to McKeesport, Pennsylvania. Having been named Tru Vu Entertainment, the company opened its doors at the former Immel's department store.
