= Hudson Beach, Florida =

Unincorporated community in Florida, U.S.

Coordinates: 28°21′52″N 82°41′36″W

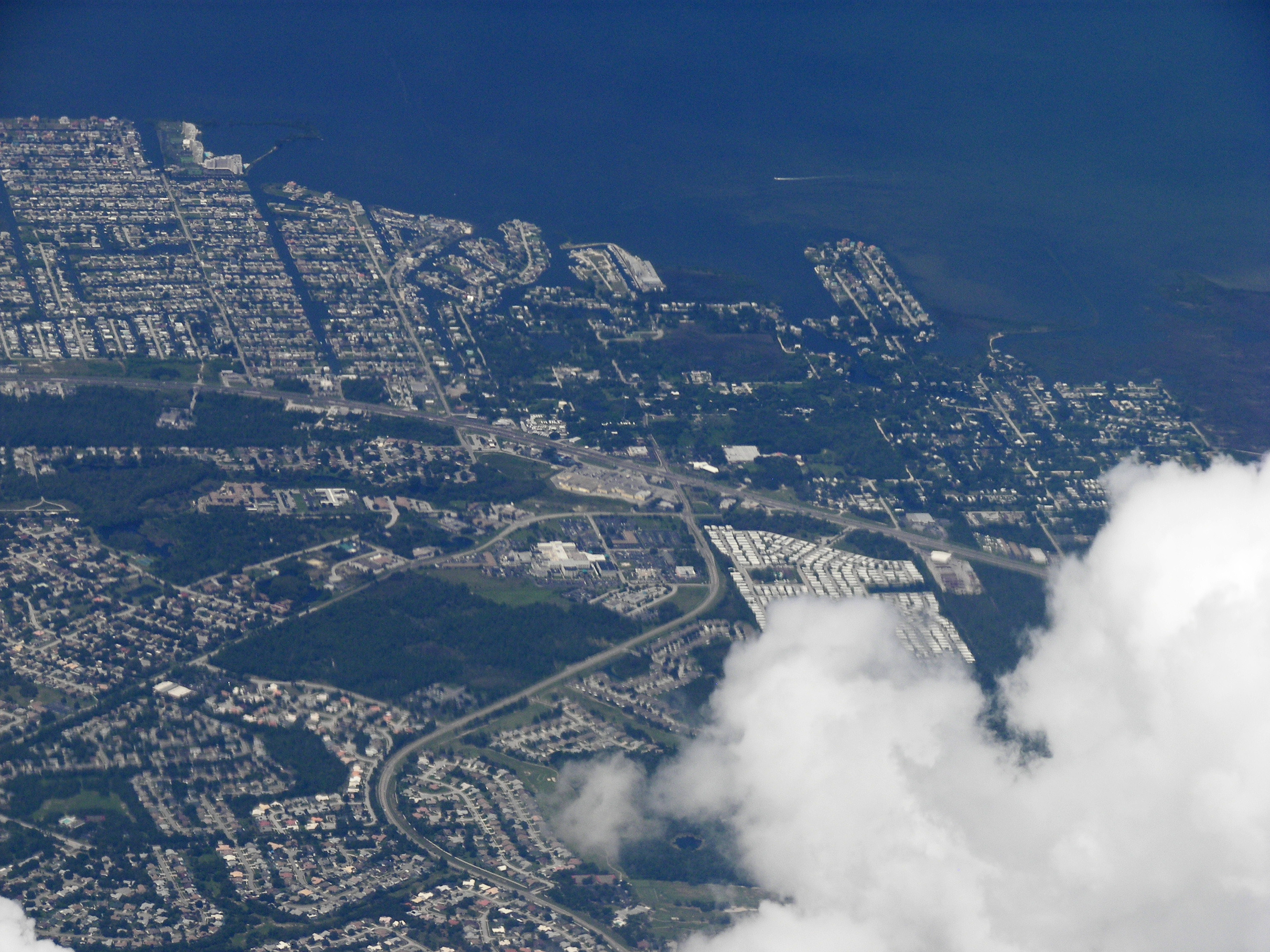
Aerial view of Hudson Beach and Hudson, Florida

Hudson Beach is a small unincorporated beach community, west of U.S. Route 19 in Pasco County, Florida, United States. The community has canals crisscrossing it, and the residences have canals in their backyard. It is just north of Port Richey. The neighborhoods are, from north to south, Sea Pines, Driftwood Isles, Cape Cay, Sunset Estates and Waterway Shores, Port Hudson, Hudson Beach Estates, Sea Ranch and Signal Cove. The canals were blasted by the Army Corps of Engineers in the late 1950s and throughout the 1960s. Today, environmental legislation prohibits this activity, making Hudson Beach one of the largest artificial canal cities in the United States, with over 25 miles (40 km) of inland waterways.

The actual beach has the distinction of being built by the people who lived here in the 1960s. It is located on Florida's west coast about 40 miles (64 km) north of St. Petersburg.
