= Gulf High School =

Public high school in New Port Richey, Florida, United States

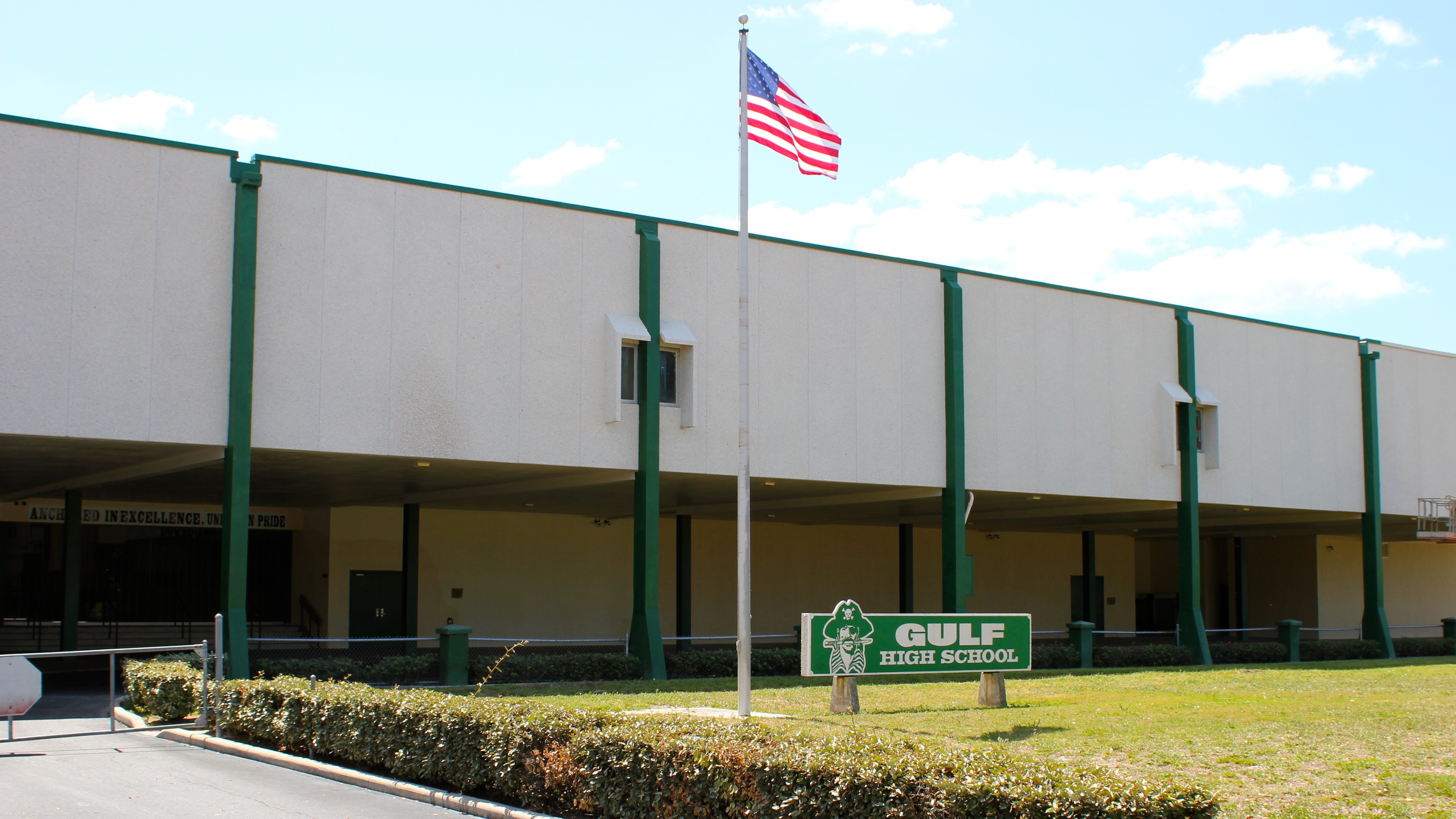
- The old building for Gulf High School. Since April 2024, the building had since been demolished.

Location
- 5355 School Rd; New Port Richey, Florida 34652-4322; United States; 28.235328°N 82.717220°W

Information
- Type: Public
- Motto: Sailing the Rising Tide
- Established: 1922; 104 years ago
- Locale: New Port Richey, Florida
- Principal: Travis DeWalt
- Teaching staff: 81.20 (FTE)
- Grades: 9-12
- Enrollment: 1,518 (2024–2025)
- Student to teacher ratio: 18.69
- Colors: Green, Yellow, and Black
- Mascot: Buccaneer
- Website: ghs.pasco.k12.fl.us

Gulf High School Buccaneers.

Gulf High School is a four-year public high school in New Port Richey, Florida. It is part of the Pasco County School System in Pasco County, Florida. It is the first high school in western Pasco County and the second school in Pasco County to offer the International Baccalaureate Program, the other being Land O' Lakes High School. Gulf High School is so named because it was originally located less than one mile from the Gulf of Mexico.

== History ==
Gulf High School opened on September 18, 1922, with an initial enrollment of 39 students and a faculty of three teachers. There were no seniors during the first school year; the first graduation took place on April 29, 1924, with eleven seniors.

Although Gulf High School remained the only high school in western Pasco County for over fifty years, enrollment remained small through the 1950s and local residents feared the state might close the school.

In the 1920s and 1930s, the sports teams were nicknamed the "Cooties," from a shortened name for the Pithlachascotee River, on which the school was situated.

In 1931, a dispute between the school trustees and the county school board over the selection of a principal was appealed to the Florida Supreme Court.

In 1938, football was revived after an absence of several years and in November of that year the Tampa Tribune said that the team was the "losingest team in the country," as it had been outscored by 442-0 thus far in the season. However, the 1941-42 football team had a 9–1 record and won the Gulf Coast Conference championship.

In 1961, Gulf High School moved into a new building, and in 1977 it moved to its third and current location at 5355 School Road, New Port Richey FL 34652.

The building which now houses Gulf High school opened as Gulf Junior High School (now Gulf Middle School) in 1971; in 1977 the two schools switched buildings.

Schools in Pasco County were racially integrated in the 1960s, and the first black students to attend Gulf High School were enrolled at the start of the 1966–67 school year.

In April 2007, the International Baccalaureate Organization approved a diploma program for Gulf High School.

In 2009, Gulf High School's first IB Senior class graduated.

In 2010, the wrestling team won the Class A state championship.

== Academics ==
=== Enrollment ===
As of current, Gulf High is estimated to enroll 1346 students, an increase of 100 students since the 2015–2016 school year.

=== Learning Academies ===
Gulf High School currently offers three learning academies:

- Institute of Health and Human Services
The focus of the IHHS, founded in 1996, is to facilitate students who aspire to pursue careers in health related fields or other human services. This learning community is heavily affiliated with the national student organization HOSA (Health Occupations Students of America). It offers a very hands-on approach to discovering where a student may best fit in the world of health and human services.
- Academy of Gaming, Simulation, Design
The focus of the Gaming Academy is to develop skills in students for use in careers related to the gaming industry.
- International Baccalaureate Program
In June 2005, the Programme for Identifying Baccalaureate Students was started, thus giving West Pasco its first IB school and Pasco County its second IB school. In April 2007, the International Baccalaureate Organization approved a diploma program for Gulf High School. Gulf High School's first IB senior class graduated in 2009. The demanding coursework of the program challenges students, prepares them for college coursework, and gives them the chance to earn college credit by passing the IB exams at the end of the year and Advanced Placement classes taken throughout the year. Community service is also heavily emphasized through CAS. The decision to place the International Baccalaureate Program at Gulf High School was finalized after several other high schools in West Pasco were considered.

== Extracurricular activities ==
=== Band and Color Guard ===
The Gulf High Marching Buccaneers have been an institution at Gulf High School since 1925. The school also has a jazz ensemble called Jazz Fusion, and a drumline called G-Force. The GHS Drumline won best in Pasco, finalizing against Pasco High School, at the King's High drum-off, Pasco bracket. The GHS color guard has earned a "Superior" rating 12 of the last 15 years at the district-wide assessment.

=== Clubs ===
- Comprehensive List of Clubs

== Notable alumni ==
- Mike McGill (Class of 1982) - skateboarder, inventor of McTwist
- Leon Orr (Class of 2010) defensive tackle for the Miami Dolphins
- Chuck Pitcock (Class of 1976) - professional football player; Tampa Bay Bandits; Tampa Bay Buccaneers
- Alexander Snitker (Class of 1993) - Libertarian Party U.S. Senate candidate in 2010, and talk radio host
- Darron Stiles (Class of 1991) - professional golfer
- Sara Walsh (Class of 1996) - anchor on ESPN's SportsCenter
- Kevin White (teacher/coach) - athletic director at Duke University
- Dewey Mitchell, Olympic judoka
