= Catharine H. T. Avery =

American author, editor and educator

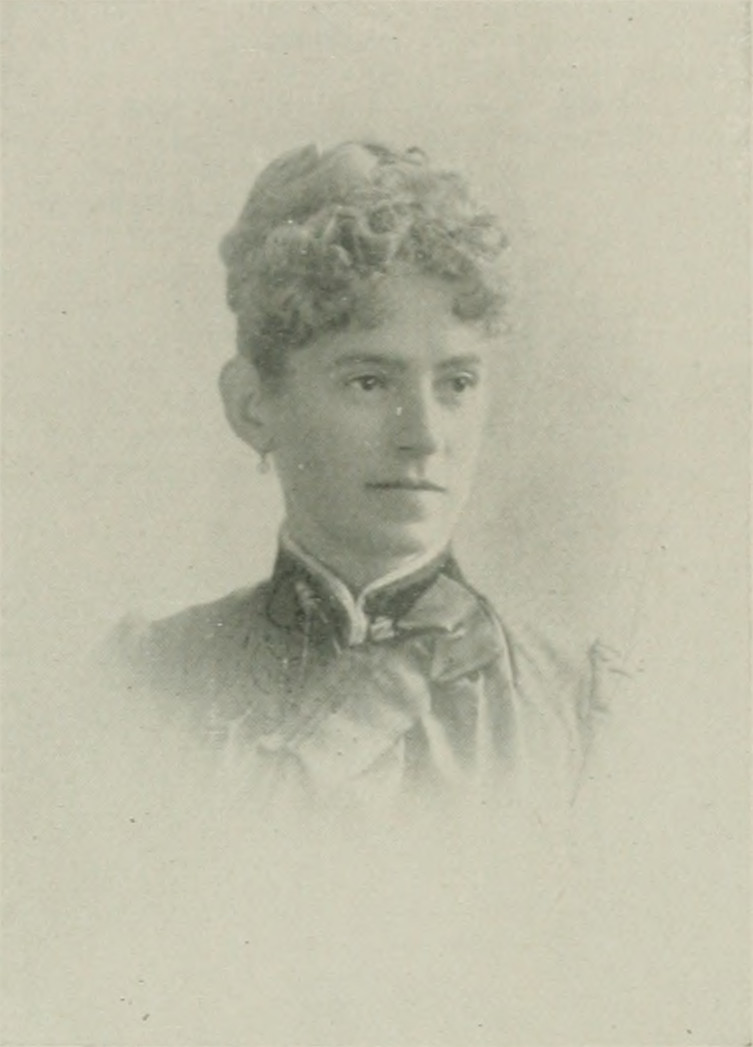
- "A Woman of the Century"
- Born: Catharine Hitchcock Tilden; December 13, 1844; Dundee, Michigan, U.S.
- Died: December 22, 1911 (aged 67); Cleveland, Ohio, U.S.
- Resting place: Knollwood Cemetery, Mayfield Heights, Cuyahoga County, Ohio
- Occupations: author, editor, educator
- Spouse: Elroy M. Avery (m. 1870)

Catharine H. T. Avery (née, Tilden; December 13, 1844 - December 22, 1911) was an American author, editor, and educator of the long nineteenth century. Of Revolutionary ancestry and hailing from Michigan, she was founder and regent of the Western Reserve Chapter of the Daughters of the American Revolution (DAR), of Cleveland, Ohio; Vice-president General of its National Society; and editor of the National Society's official organ, the American Monthly. She also served two years as a member of the Cleveland School Board, being the first woman in Ohio chosen to an elective office.

After the death of her father in 1861, she moved with her step-mother to Massachusetts. She was educated in the Normal School of that state and taught school in Massachusetts. Soon after the first meeting of the DAR, she became a member of the District of Columbia Society. The first president-general, Caroline Harrison, offered her the state regency of Ohio. She declined, but accepted the regent's commission for the Western Reserve Chapter, which she organized, the first in Ohio. In 1895, she was unanimously elected regent of the state. On retiring from the state regency, she was elected vice president-general from Ohio, and at the expiration of that term, the state bestowed upon her the life title "honorary state regent." From the time she joined the order until her death, 20 years later, she never relaxed her interest or activities in the work of the DAR in Ohio and the U.S. During the last 12 years of her life, she was editor of the American Monthly magazine, the official organ of the national society. Even earlier, she was a generous contributor to the newspapers on subjects which interested her. She was elected to membership in the Cleveland Woman's Press Club, twice serving as its president. She was its delegate to the conventions of the International League of Press Clubs held at Saint Paul, Minnesota and San Francisco, California. Avery was a close friend of Lydia Maria Child and attracted the notice of Wendell Phillips.

== Early life and education ==
Catharine (or Catherine) Hitchcock Tilden was born in Dundee, Monroe County, Michigan, December 13, 1844. She was the daughter of Hon. Junius Tilden (Yarmouth, Massachusetts, November 28, 1813 - Monroe, Michigan, March 1, 1861), formerly a prominent lawyer of that state, and Zeruah (Rich) Tilden (Wellfleet, Massachusetts, January 28, 1813 - Dundee, Michigan, June 30, 1854). Catherine's mother was a descendant of Governor Treat, of Connecticut; Governor Roberts, of New Hampshire; and of Governor Prence, of Massachusetts; as well as of the Mayflower pilgrims, Elder Brewster, "of blessed memory," and stout Stephen Hopkins. Four of the mother's ancestors served in the Continental Congress and the American Revolutionary War. Col. John Bailey, of the 2nd Massachusetts Regiment, was at Bunker Hill and Monmouth, crossed the Delaware with Washington, and was at Horatio Gates's side in the northern campaign which ended in Burgoyne's surrender. The Gad Hitchcocks, father and son, served as chaplain and as surgeon. The elder Gad, in 1774, preached an election sermon in which he advocated the cause of the Thirteen Colonies and brought forth the wrath of Gage and the thanks of the Massachusetts General Court. Samuel Tilden, private from Marshfield, Massachusetts, and member of the Committee of Safety, completes the list of her Revolutionary ancestors. When Catherine's mother died, she left two children (Catharine and her sister, Augusta), four children having died earlier.

Avery received her early education at Monroe. In 1855, her father married Ellen T. Haskell, of Cohasset, Massachusetts. After his death in 1861, the two girls were educated by their stepmother in Massachusetts. Avery attended the State Normal School of Farmingham (now Framingham State University) in Massachusetts, graduating in 1867. She subsequently took a higher course to fit herself for high school and college work.

== Career ==
=== Educator ===
In 1869, while secretly engaged to Dr. Elroy McKendree Avery, she took over the principalship of the Battle Creek High School, at his recommendation, while he returned to the University of Michigan to complete his degree. They were married on July 2, 1870, at Battle Creek, Michigan. In 1871, the Averys moved to the village of East Cleveland and engaged in public school work, he as superintendent and she as principal of the high school. A year or two later, the village was annexed to the city of Cleveland, but she continued in high school and normal school work until 1882. In 1879, they both relinquished teaching as a regular occupation, but till she died in 1911, Avery's teacher's certificate was kept in force. She was frequently employed as a substitute or emergency teacher in the Cleveland high schools and, as an instructor in county teachers' institutes. Thereafter, Avery worked with her husband in historical research and writing.

=== Public service ===
Avery was elected a member of the Cleveland City School Board, 1895 (first woman ever chosen to elective office in Ohio); elected member (first woman) of the Cleveland City Board of School Examiners. 1900; and elected (only woman) of the City Library Board, 1900. She served as Vice-president General of the National Society of the Daughters of the American Revolution, and in 1900, became editor of its official organ, The American Monthly. Mrs. Avery was a member of the East End Conversational Club, the oldest literary society for women in the city, serving two terms as president. She was a member of the Cleveland Woman's Press Club, and twice represented it in the International League. She traveled on behalf of the Press Club from New York City to the Golden Gate; her letters, which described the trip, were published in The Cleveland Leader. She was a member of the executive committee of the Art and History Club. She was the regent of the Cleveland Chapter of the DAR. For 20 years, she was a member of the Euclid Avenue Congregational Church of Cleveland. She was a recognized authority in genealogical matters. She died December 21, 1911, in Cleveland.

Public experience gave Avery a large vision of things, a judgment that was characterized as conservative and rare, and she became a counselor and adviser of women in their efforts to find themselves. She was a member of the Relief Corps, of Sorosis, of the Federation of Women's Clubs, the Conversational, Art and Social Study, and W. C. T. U. organizations. In 1896 the Woman's Auxiliary of the Cleveland Centennial Commission was organized with her as president for life. She was perhaps the first woman of Cleveland to realize the necessity of women becoming acquainted with parliamentary law. Avery was at the front regarding all the relief work which grew out of the Spanish–American War, serving as vice president of the Spanish War Emergency Relief Board. She was in charge of organization and had under her 181 societies which furnished relief to soldiers in quarters, in camp and in transit.

Avery became a member of the Public Library board of trustees and served until 1903. During that period, she was chairman of the committees on books, employees, and rules, and a member of the extension committee, and for a year, vice president of the board. In the selection of books, particularly in the subjects in which she was especially interested, she was the mentor and adviser of the library, particularly in the realm of American history, of New England history, particularly of local history and genealogy. Her knowledge of local New England history and family history was notable. Her knowledge of the original sources of the compilations, of the local conditions was extensive.

== Death ==
Catherine Hitchcock Tilden Avery died at Cleveland, December 22, 1911.

== Honors ==
In 1897, after Avery became the Vice-president General of the National Society of DAR, the Western Reserve Chapter honored Avery for her contributions:

"Mrs. Avery, the ladies of the Western Reserve Chapter of the Daughters of the American Revolution doubt whether your modesty permits you to realize how much you are esteemed by them, and how greatly your services in behalf of the chapter are appreciated. As their representative it is my pleasant duty to say in your presence the things we are in the habit of saying to each other. We realize that this Chapter owes its origin to you, that since then you have labored for it continuously, effectively, and unselfishly. We realize, also, that we are sharing the honors which your character and ability have won from the Chapters of the State and from the members of the Continental Congress. We rejoice that you are ours. The Chapter has decreed this trifling token of our pride and appreciation."

The box contained a Regent's pin and five gold slides called "ancestral bars," each of which was engraved with the name of a Revolutionary patriot from whom Avery was descended: Colonel John Bailey, Gad Hitchcock, LL. D., Gar Hitchcock, M. D., Deacon Samuel Tilden, Samuel Tilden Jr.
