= Kevin White (athletic director) =

American college administrator (born 1950)

Biographical details
- Born: September 25, 1950 (age 76); Amityville, New York, U.S.
- Education: Saint Joseph's College (BA); Central Michigan University (MA); Southern Illinois University (PhD)

Administrative career (AD unless noted)
- 1982–1987: Loras
- 1987–1991: Maine
- 1991–1996: Tulane
- 1996–2000: Arizona State
- 2000–2008: Notre Dame
- 2008–2021: Duke

Kevin Michael White (born September 25, 1950) is an American college administrator, and former athletic director at Duke University. He held this position from May 30, 2008, until his retirement on September 1, 2021. White succeeded Joe Alleva as the Blue Devils' AD when Alleva accepted the same position at Louisiana State University.

He held similar positions at the University of Notre Dame, Arizona State University, Tulane University, the University of Maine, and Loras College.

== Early life and education ==
White was born in Amityville, New York. Earning a bachelor's degree in business administration in 1972 from St. Joseph's College in Rensselaer, Indiana, White went on to earn a master's degree in athletics administration from Central Michigan University in 1976. He completed his Ph.D. in 1983 at Southern Illinois University with an emphasis in higher education administration. He has done postdoctoral work at Harvard University in the Institute for Educational Management.

== Teaching and coaching careers ==
=== High school ===
White is a career educator, having started as a high school teacher at Gulf High School, in New Port Richey, Florida. While at Gulf High, he coached cross country and track and assisted with the football and wrestling programs.

=== College ===
Holding a Ph.D. in education, White taught management courses at Notre Dame's Mendoza College of Business in the MBA program during spring semesters of his tenure at the school.

As a coach, White served at Southeast Missouri State University (1981–1982) as the head track and field coach, and as assistant track and field and cross country coach at Central Michigan University (1976–1980). While at Loras College he originated the National Catholic Basketball Tournament.

== Administrative career and controversies ==
Notre Dame's flagship football program struggled during White's tenure. Notre Dame football teams have started 0–3 only two times in the school's history: in 2001 (the season after White negotiated an extension of coach Bob Davie's contract) and 2007 (two seasons after White gave coach Charlie Weis a 10-year contract extension, which Notre Dame was paying off six seasons after Weis's 2009 firing).

White is also responsible for the hiring of George O'Leary (who was fired a week later after falsifying his resume) and Tyrone Willingham (who started 8–0 but finished 13–15, with eight of those losses coming by 22 points or more, more than any coach in school history). White is also responsible for the hiring and retaining of Duke women's basketball coach Joanne P. McCallie (even after McCallie was investigated by Duke for the mistreatment of players and assistant coaches).

== Family ==
White and his wife Jane have five children, three sons and two daughters. Four of their children work in college athletics: Mike, head coach of the Georgia Bulldogs men's basketball team; Danny, newly hired in January 2021 as athletic director of the Tennessee Volunteers; Brian, athletic director for the Virginia Tech Hokies; and Mariah Chappell, assistant athletic director for the SMU Mustangs. Their eldest child, Maureen Treadway, is a high school English teacher in Arizona.

== Hall of fame inductee ==
White was inducted into the Suffolk Sports Hall of Fame on Long Island in the Athletic Directors Category with the Class of 2006.
