= Crews Lake Wilderness Park =

Park in Florida, United States

Coordinates: 28°22′42″N 82°32′05″W

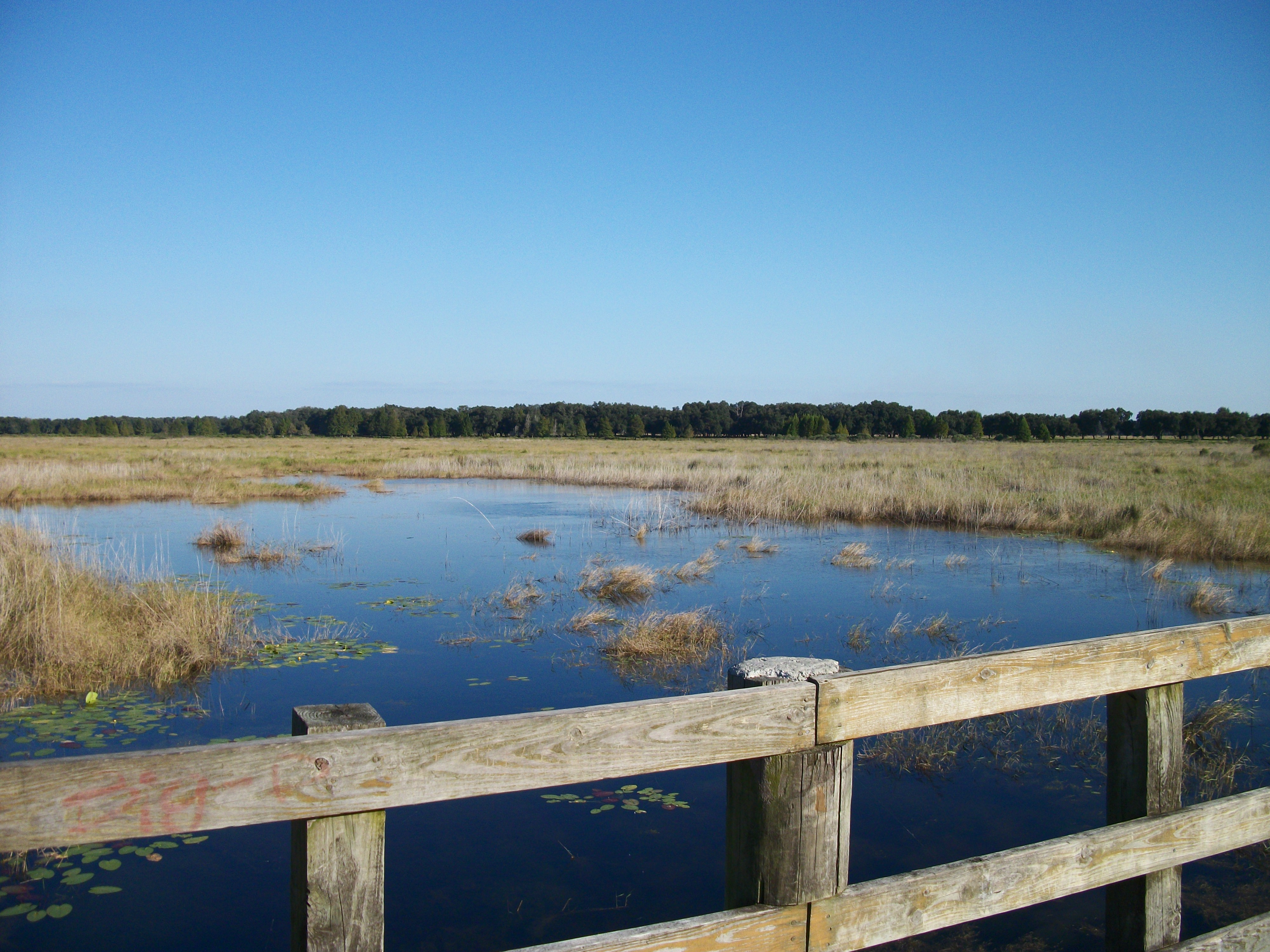
View of Crew Lake

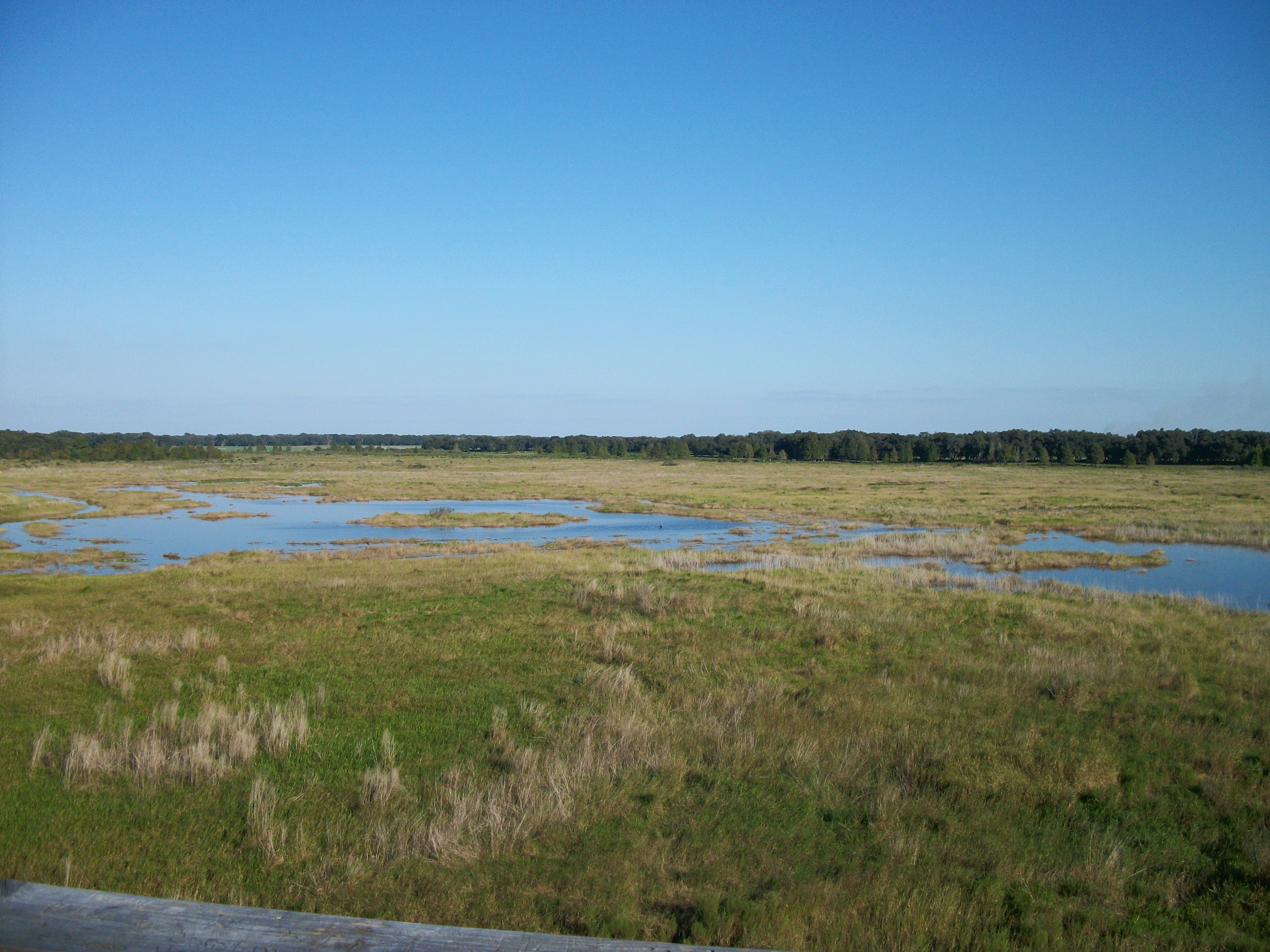
Drought-stricken Crews Lake; October 2010.

Crews Lake Wilderness Park is located off Shady Hills Road in Pasco County, Florida. The park includes hiking trails, a short paved bike trail, playground, wooden tower, athletic fields, and the 7 1/2 in (190.5 mm) gauge Central Pasco & Gulf Railroad. Rides on the miniature railroad are offered the second Saturday of every month. The lake is the source for the Pithlachascotee River. Jumping Gully Preserve is adjacent to the park.

Crews Lake, along with Moon Lake, reached its lowest recorded level in 2009 before slowly regaining some depth with heavier rains in the summer of 2010. The lake has recovered further due to the rains produced by Tropical Storm Debby (2012), up to the point of flooding dirt pathways and areas near pavilions, as of October, 2016.
