= Elroy M. Avery =

American politician

- Avery around the time of the American Civil War.
- Born: Elroy McKendree Avery; July 14, 1844; Erie, Michigan
- Died: December 1, 1935 (aged 91); New Port Richey, Florida
- Education: University of Michigan
- Occupations: Politician, author, historian, and soldier
- Known for: Served on Cleveland City Council, Ohio Senate, 11th Michigan Cavalry; first mayor of New Port Richey, Florida; wrote physics and chemistry textbooks, history of the United States, Cleveland and New Port Richey
- Board member of: First State Bank of New Port Richey and Founder and three times President of the Western Reserve Society Sons of the American Revolution
- Spouse: Catherine Hitchcock Tilden
- Parent(s): Caspar Hugh and Dorothy (Putnam) Avery

Elroy McKendree Avery, Ph.D., LL.D. (July 14, 1844 – December 1, 1935) was school principal, politician, author, and historian. Avery was an Ohio State Senator in the 1890s before becoming an early resident of west Pasco County, Florida, and was the first mayor of New Port Richey, Florida. As an author, Avery wrote school textbooks about physics and chemistry as well as books about the history of the United States, Cleveland, and New Port Richey.

Avery was born in Erie, Michigan, as the elder son of Caspar Hugh and Dorothy (Putnam) Avery. He fought in the American Civil War achieving the rank of Sergeant-Major while with the 11th Michigan Cavalry. Also in the 1860s, he worked as a writer for the Detroit Tribune. In Battle Creek, Michigan, he was a high school principal in 1869 and married Catherine Hitchcock Tilden on July 2, 1870.

In 1871, Avery graduated from the University of Michigan and relocated to Cleveland where he continued as a school principal from 1871 to 1879. On May 5, 1892 he along with 22 other men founded the Western Reserve Society Sons of the American Revolution in Cleveland, Ohio. In 1891 and 1892, Avery was on the Cleveland City Council before being elected to the state senate and serving from 1893 to 1897.

On December 22, 1911, Mrs. Avery died. Elroy Avery worked as a publisher in Cleveland until he retired and moved to New Port Richey, Florida in June 1919. He brought a personal collection of over 1,000 books which he used to help establish the Avery Library and Historical Society on December 22, 1919, and opened the doors on April 10, 1920 (currently the New Port Richey Public Library and West Pasco Historical Society Museum and Library). He was also the chairman and director of the First State Bank of New Port Richey which was founded on October 25, 1921. On October 27, 1924, New Port Richey was incorporated and Avery was named its first mayor at age 80, serving until 1925.

He died there on December 1, 1935.

== Partial list of publications ==
- Elements of Chemistry, 1881, ASIN B00M69I1FY
- The Complete Chemistry: A text book for high schools and academies, 1883, ASIN B0008735MU
- Elements of Natural Philosophy : a text book for high schools and academies, Sheldon and Company, 1885, ASIN B000JG6HCA
- The Averys of Groton, 1888, ASIN B000894JK0
- Elementary Physics, Sheldon and Company, 1897, ASIN B00069Y8IA
- The Evolution of a Colonial System, 1900, ASIN B0008C7BWK
- A History of the United States and Its People from Their Earliest Records to the Present Time, 16 volumes, the first was originally from 1904 (reprinted in 2001, ISBN 1-4021-9482-X).
- John Humfrey, Massachusetts magistrate: Did he marry the daughter of the third Earl of Lincoln!, 1912, ASIN B0006AGIUA
- A History of Cleveland and Its Environs: the Heart of New Connecticut. 3 volumes. Chicago, IL: The Lewis Publishing Company. 1918. ASIN B000GPVFBC
- The Genesis of New Port Richey, 1924, ASIN B00085U8WW
