= Velva Darnell =

American singer-songwriter

- Born: Velva Humphrey; October 14, 1938; Battletown, Kentucky, U.S.
- Died: August 12, 2014 (aged 75) Hudson, Florida, U.S.
- Genres: Country, Pop
- Occupations: singer, songwriter, author
- Years active: 1966–2014
- Labels: Dot Records, Bullet, Archway

Velva Darnell (October 14, 1938 – August 12, 2014) was an American country and pop singer. She began her career appearing with bands in and around the Louisville, Kentucky area.

== Career ==
In 1966 Darnell signed with Dot Records. Her first and only release on Dot (45-16906)(MB-21109) was on June 29 of that year. The release contained two songs penned by songwriter Hank Mills and received great reviews in Record World Magazine and the "A" side "Not Me" was predicted to hit the "Hot Country Singles Chart" in the July 23, 1966 issue of Billboard Magazine.

On June 29, 1966, in the excitement and celebration of the event of the release of her first recording, her father, age 59, had a heart attack and died while listening to the record. It was several years before Darnell finally reconciled with her father's death and returned to performing.

In 1974, Darnell, along with her husband William, co-founded the short lived recording company, Archway records.

Darnell continued touring and performing regularly until 2004.

In 2010, Darnell's first book of poetry was published under the pen name Velva Darnell-Waldman. The book is titled "Poems of love and life".

She died at her home in Hudson, Florida on August 12, 2014.

== Discography ==
- "It Keeps Slipping My Mind" Dot (1966)
- Lived, Loved And Lost b/w Mama No Care O, Bullet 11011 1966
- "Not Me" Dot (1966)
- "Are You Gambling More" Archway (1974)
- "Seven-Eleven" Archway (1974)
- "Lived, Loved and Lost" Bullet (1974)
- "Seven-Eleven" Bullet (1974)
