= Leon Orr =

American football player (born 1992)

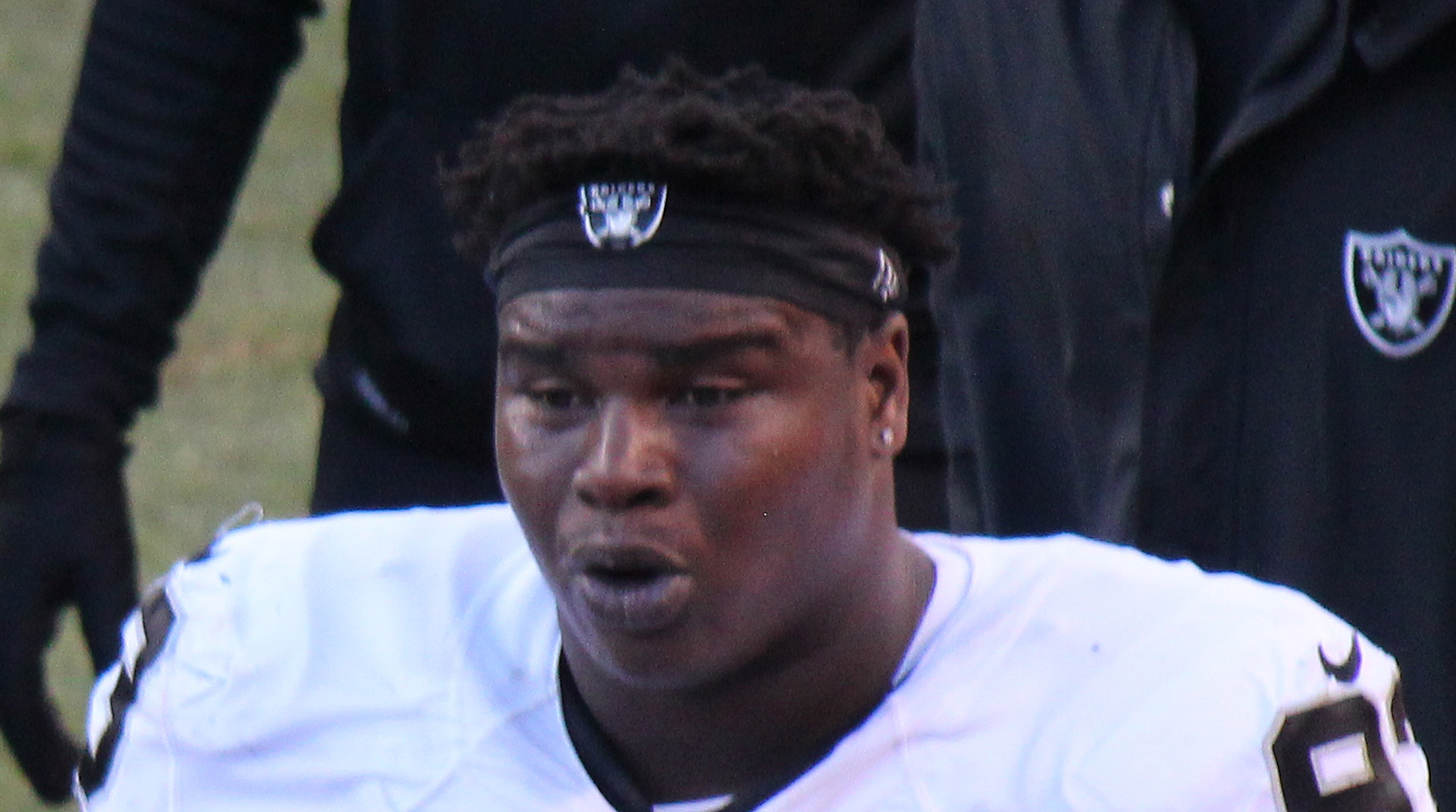
- Orr with the Oakland Raiders in 2015

No. 99, 93, 96
- Position: Defensive tackle

Personal information
- Born: February 11, 1992 (age 34); New Port Richey, Florida
- Listed height: 6 ft 5 in (1.96 m)
- Listed weight: 320 lb (145 kg)

Career information
- High school: Gulf (New Port Richey)
- College: Florida
- NFL draft: 2015: undrafted

Career history
- Oakland Raiders (2015); Miami Dolphins (2016); Orlando Apollos (2019); Los Angeles Wildcats (2020)*; Tampa Bay Vipers (2020)*
- * Offseason or practice squad member only

Career NFL statistics
- Total tackles: 3
- Sacks: 0
- Forced fumbles: 0
- Fumble recoveries: 0
- Stats at Pro Football Reference

Leon Orr (born February 11, 1992) is an American former professional football player who was a defensive tackle in the National Football League (NFL). He played college football for the Florida Gators.

== Professional career ==
=== Oakland Raiders ===
On May 8, 2015, Oakland Raiders signed Orr as an undrafted free agent. On September 5, 2015, he was waived. On September 7, 2015, he was signed to the practice squad. On December 12, Orr was promoted to the 53-man roster. On August 29, 2016, Orr was released by the Raiders.

=== Miami Dolphins ===
On September 20, 2016, Orr was signed to the Dolphins' practice squad. He was promoted to the active roster on October 12. On November 29, Orr was arrested on charges of marijuana possession, possession of a controlled substance, possession of an unregistered firearm, and was released by the Dolphins the following day.

=== Orlando Apollos ===
In 2018, Orr signed with the Orlando Apollos of the AAF for the 2019 season. The league ceased operations in April 2019.

=== Tampa Bay Vipers ===
Orr was traded to the Tampa Bay Vipers in exchange for defensive tackle Trevon Sanders on December 11, 2019. Orr was released during mini-camp in December 2019.

=== Los Angeles Wildcats ===
Orr was selected in the 6th round during phase three in the 2020 XFL Draft by the Los Angeles Wildcats.
