= Jumping Gully Preserve =

Coordinates: 28.3851°N 82.5086°W

Jumping Gully Preserve is an area of protected land in Spring Hill, Florida. The 598 acres (242 ha) are located north of SR 52 and west of U.S. Highway 41 at 18812 Fishburne Drive, northeast of the Crews Lake Wilderness Area. Prescribed burns are used to maintain the property. Access is by scheduled appointment.

The area provides gopher tortoise habitat with soil types including Tavares sand, Sparr fine sand, and Basinger fine sand. Herbicide applications have been used to improve the habitat for the turtles. The land was acquired in 2009 and 2011.
