= Richey Suncoast Theatre =

Theatre in New Port Richey, Florida, U.S.

Coordinates: 28.24958°N 82.71981°W

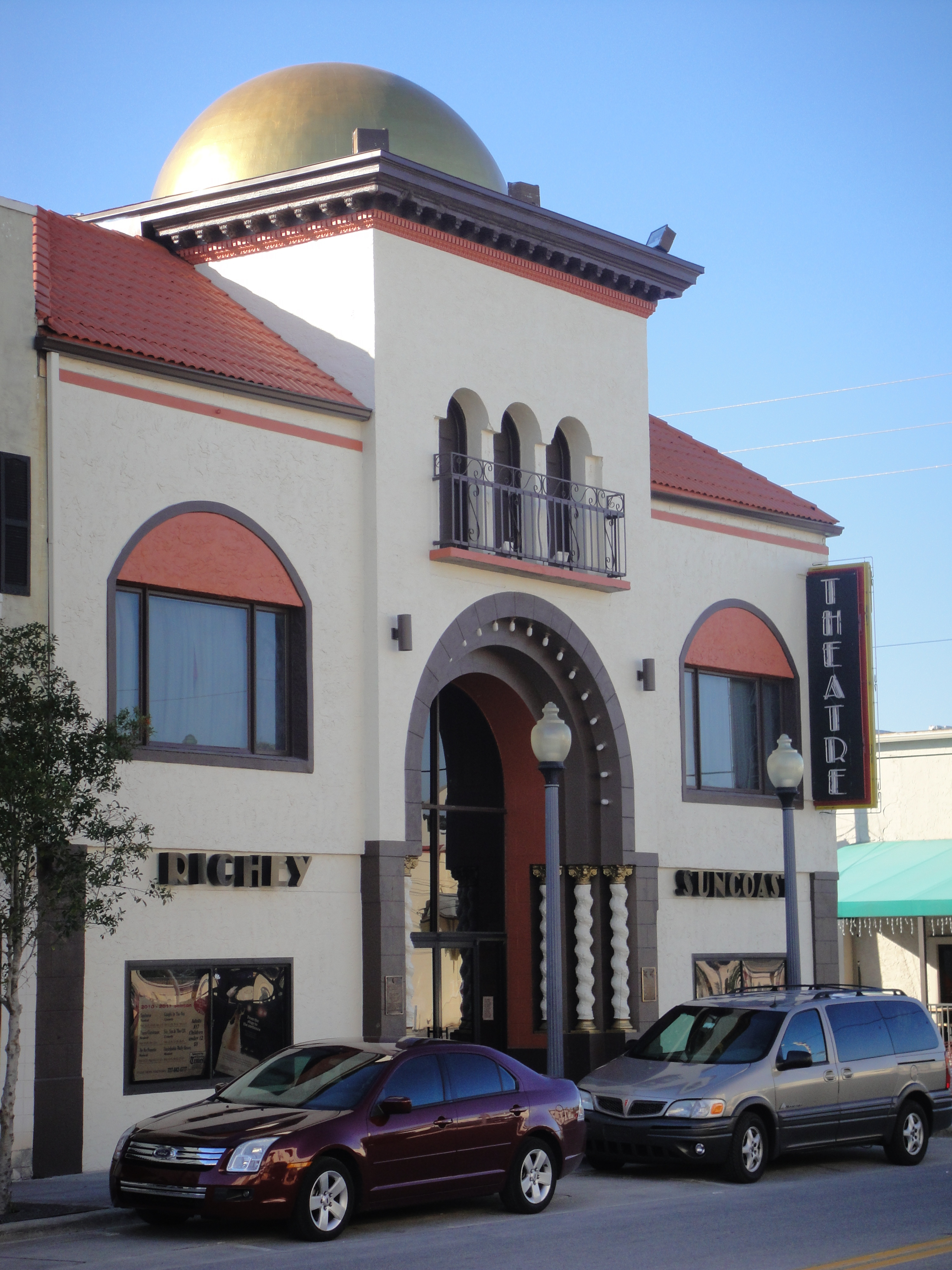
Richey Suncoast Theatre

Richey Suncoast Theatre is a historic former movie theatre built in 1925 and later restored for use as a playhouse and community theatre in New Port Richey, Florida. It is named for silent film star Thomas Meighan and opened as the Meighan Theatre on July 1, 1926 with a screening of Meighan's movie The New Klondike. Meighan himself was not present but sent a congratulatory telegram.

In 1930 sound was added to the theatre. Meighan himself appeared to push the start button for the sound. The theatre closed in 1934 due to the Great Depression. It reopened in 1938 and went through multiple owners, with names such as "Vogue" and "Cinema". It ceased to operate as a movie theatre in 1968 before it was purchased by newly formed Community Theatre group "Suncoast Young People's Theatre" and reopened on August 25, 1972 performing the musical "Fiddler On The Roof". In 1974, the Suncoast Young People's Theatre merged with another local company, The Richey Theatre Guild and became known as Richey Suncoast Theatre.

The theatre operates as a 501-3c Non-profit putting on seasons of theatrical productions, along with visiting tribute bands, stand up comedians, and screening cult classic and independent films.

== Background ==
Meighan's interest in Florida developed after talks with his realtor-brother James E. Meighan. He bought property in Ocala, Florida in 1925. In 1927, he built a home in New Port Richey, Florida where he spent his winters. He intended to shoot his film We're All Gamblers there, however, filming was moved to Miami. The Meighans also hoped to draw other celebrities to the area. Meighan had a vision for New Port Richey to be an eastern U.S. version of Hollywood. This plan failed as the property boom in Florida busted in the 1920s and the 1929 stock market crash set off the period known as the Great Depression.
