= John C. Brasher =

American judge and politician

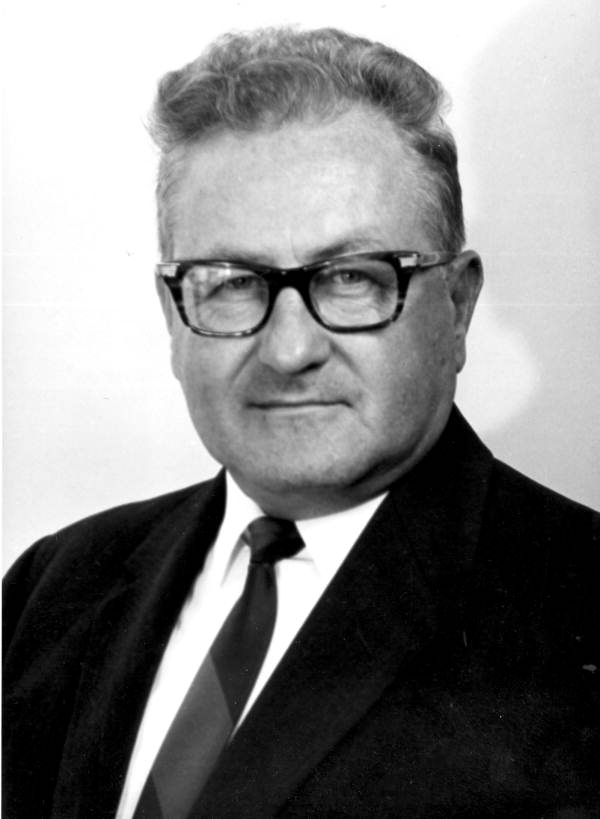
- Brasher in 1966

Member of the Florida House of Representatives from Pasco County
- In office 1966–1967

Personal details
- Died: September 1, 1998 (aged 80) Gallant, Alabama, U.S.
- Party: Republican
- Occupation: Judge

John C. Brasher (died September 1, 1998) was an American judge and politician. He served as a Republican member of the Florida House of Representatives.

== Life and career ==
Brasher served in the United States Army Air Forces during World War II as a pilot. He was a municipal judge and a member of the Port Richey, Florida Port Richey City Council serving for two terms, before becoming mayor of Port Richey.

In 1966, Brasher was elected to the Florida House of Representatives, winning a special election after defeating Tommy Stevens. He served until 1967.

Brasher died in September 1998 at his home in Gallant, Alabama, at the age of 80.
