= Port Richey, Florida =

- City
- City of Port Richey
- Flag Seal Logo
- Mottoes: "Our Gateway to the Gulf" "On the Beautiful Pithlachascotee River"
- Location in Pasco County and the state of Florida
- Coordinates: 28°16′33″N 82°43′30″W
- Country: United States
- State: Florida
- County: Pasco
- Settled: December 1883
- Incorporated: May 18, 1925

Government
  - Type: Council-Manager
  - Mayor: John Eric Hoover
  - Vice Mayor: Chris Maher
  - Council Members: Christine Sullivan, Robert Hubbard, and Lisa Burke
  - City Manager: Don A. King Jr.
  - City Clerk: Ashlee McDonough

Area
  - Total: 2.28 sq mi (5.90 km^{2})
  - Land: 2.22 sq mi (5.75 km^{2})
  - Water: 0.058 sq mi (0.15 km^{2})
- Elevation: 3 ft (0.91 m)

Population (2020)
  - Total: 3,052
  - Density: 1,374.0/sq mi (530.52/km^{2})
- Time zone: UTC-5 (Eastern (EST))
  - Summer (DST): UTC-4 (EDT)
- ZIP code: 34668
- Area code: 727
- FIPS code: 12-58600
- GNIS feature ID: 2404556
- Website: cityofportrichey.gov

Port Richey is a city in Pasco County, Florida, United States. It is a suburban city included in the Tampa-St. Petersburg-Clearwater, Florida Metropolitan Statistical Area. As of 2020, the city had a population of 3,052.

== History ==
On December 1883, Aaron M. Richey arrived from St. Joseph, Missouri, and settled near the mouth of the Pithlachascotee River. He established a post office in his home on July 9, 1884.

The City of Port Richey was incorporated as a municipality on May 18, 1925, in response to the incorporation of New Port Richey the previous year. The name Port Richey is older than the name New Port Richey, as the post offices were established in 1884 and 1915, respectively.

Singer Johnny Cash owned a home along the Pithlachascotee River from 1979 until 2002. Cash and his wife June Carter Cash inherited the house from Maybelle Carter after her death, and they sold it in 2002 shortly before their deaths in 2003.

The population of Port Richey has remained small, and proposals to abolish the city have gone before the voters several times—on May 12, 1953, on December 26, 1974, on December 9, 1975, on December 12, 1978, on April 9, 1997, on April 10, 2007, and on Sept. 30, 2019.

On February 21, 2019, Mayor Dale Massad was taken into custody by the Florida Department of Law Enforcement with assistance from the Pasco County Sheriff's Office and the local SWAT team on charges of practicing medicine without a license. He also later was charged with two counts of attempted homicide for opening fire on officers as they attempted to serve the warrant. The next day, Governor Ron DeSantis signed an executive order to remove Massad from office. Three weeks later, Acting Mayor Terrence Rowe was arrested for several charges, including obstruction of justice and use of a two-way communication device to facilitate the commission of a crime. The charges were described as an "offshoot" of the charges against Massad. DeSantis removed Rowe from office on March 20, 2019, which left the city with no one to serve as mayor. The three remaining members of city council were unable to agree on a replacement. State Senator Ed Hooper and Representative Amber Mariano sought to dissolve the city in response. This effort was later dropped.

== Geography ==
According to the United States Census Bureau, the city has a total area of 2.7 square miles (7.0 km^{2}), of which 2.1 square miles (5.4 km^{2}) is land and 0.6 square miles (1.6 km^{2}) (22.99%) is water.

=== Climate ===
The City of Port Richey is part of the humid subtropical climate zone with a Köppen Climate Classification of "Cfa" (C = mild temperate, f = fully humid, and a = hot summer).

== Demographics ==
Historical population
Census	Pop.	Note	%±
1930	104		—
1940	134		28.8%
1950	376		180.6%
1960	1,931		413.6%
1970	1,259		−34.8%
1980	2,165		72.0%
1990	2,523		16.5%
2000	3,021		19.7%
2010	2,671		−11.6%
2020	3,052		14.3%
U.S. Decennial Census

=== Racial and ethnic composition ===
Port Richey racial composition (Hispanics excluded from racial categories) (NH = Non-Hispanic)
Race	Pop 2010	Pop 2020	% 2010	% 2020
White (NH)	2,371	2,416	88.77%	79.16%
Black or African American (NH)	37	105	1.39%	3.44%
Native American or Alaska Native (NH)	14	5	0.52%	0.16%
Asian (NH)	45	36	1.68%	1.18%
Pacific Islander or Native Hawaiian (NH)	1	0	0.04%	0.00%
Some other race (NH)	2	8	0.07%	0.26%
Two or more races/Multiracial (NH)	42	118	1.57%	3.87%
Hispanic or Latino (any race)	159	364	5.95%	11.93%
Total	2,671	3,052		

=== 2020 census ===
As of the 2020 census, Port Richey had a population of 3,052. The median age was 55.4 years. 14.0% of residents were under the age of 18 and 30.8% of residents were 65 years of age or older. For every 100 females there were 99.0 males, and for every 100 females age 18 and over there were 99.1 males age 18 and over.

As of 2020, 100.0% of residents lived in urban areas, while 0.0% lived in rural areas.

In 2020, there were 1,496 households in Port Richey, of which 19.1% had children under the age of 18 living in them. Of all households, 35.8% were married-couple households, 25.9% were households with a male householder and no spouse or partner present, and 29.4% were households with a female householder and no spouse or partner present. About 40.5% of all households were made up of individuals and 22.0% had someone living alone who was 65 years of age or older.

In 2020, there were 1,923 housing units, of which 22.2% were vacant. The homeowner vacancy rate was 5.7% and the rental vacancy rate was 13.0%.

The 2020 American Community Survey 5-year estimates reported 754 families residing in the city.

=== 2010 census ===
As of the 2010 United States census, there were 2,671 people, 1,454 households, and 709 families residing in the city.

=== 2000 census ===
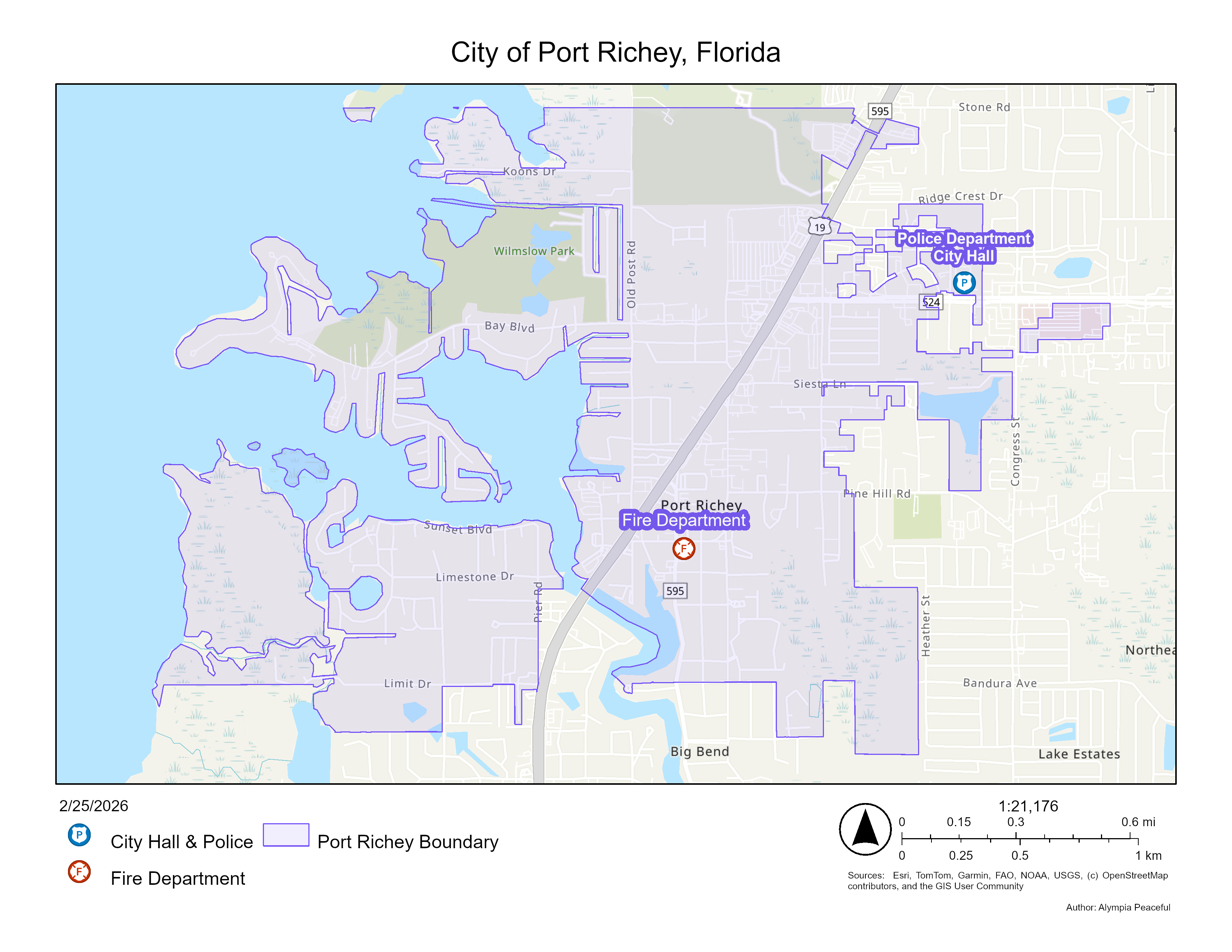
Esri map of City of Port Richey

As of the census of 2000, there were 3,021 people, 1,424 households, and 770 families residing in the city. The population density was 1,433.9 inhabitants per square mile (553.6/km^{2}). There were 1,746 housing units at an average density of 828.7 per square mile (320.0/km^{2}). The racial makeup of the city was 96.13% White, 0.63% African American, 0.60% Native American, 1.09% Asian, 0.07% Pacific Islander, 0.36% from other races, and 1.13% from two or more races. Hispanic or Latino of any race were 2.88% of the population.

In 2000, there were 1,424 households, out of which 15.7% had children under the age of 18 living with them, 44.1% were married couples living together, 6.4% had a female householder with no husband present, and 45.9% were non-families. 37.4% of all households were made up of individuals, and 15.2% had someone living alone who was 65 years of age or older. The average household size was 2.02 and the average family size was 2.61.

In 2000, in the city, the population was spread out, with 14.8% under the age of 18, 6.3% from 18 to 24, 25.0% from 25 to 44, 26.7% from 45 to 64, and 27.1% who were 65 years of age or older. The median age was 48 years. For every 100 females, there were 99.5 males. For every 100 females age 18 and over, there were 98.1 males.

In 2000, the median income for a household in the city was $27,404, and the median income for a family was $40,050. Males had a median income of $30,473 versus $22,139 for females. The per capita income for the city was $20,711. About 9.1% of families and 16.1% of the population were below the poverty line, including 34.6% of those under age 18 and 3.1% of those age 65 or over.

== Public Safety ==
The City of Port Richey is served by the Port Richey Police Dept. and the Port Richey Fire Dept. Ambulance Service is provided by Pasco County Fire Rescue. There is a hospital within walking distance of the fire department.

== Points of interest ==
- Gulf View Square, an enclosed shopping mall, located north of Port Richey.

== Notable people ==
- John C. Brasher, member of the Florida House of Representatives and mayor of Port Richey
- Maybelle Carter, country musician, mother of June, and mother-in-law of Johnny
- June Carter Cash, country music singer, songwriter, actress, author, daughter of Maybelle, and wife of Johnny
- Johnny Cash, country music singer-songwriter, actor, son-in-law of Maybelle, and husband of June

== See also ==
- New Port Richey
