= West Pasco Historical Society Museum and Library =

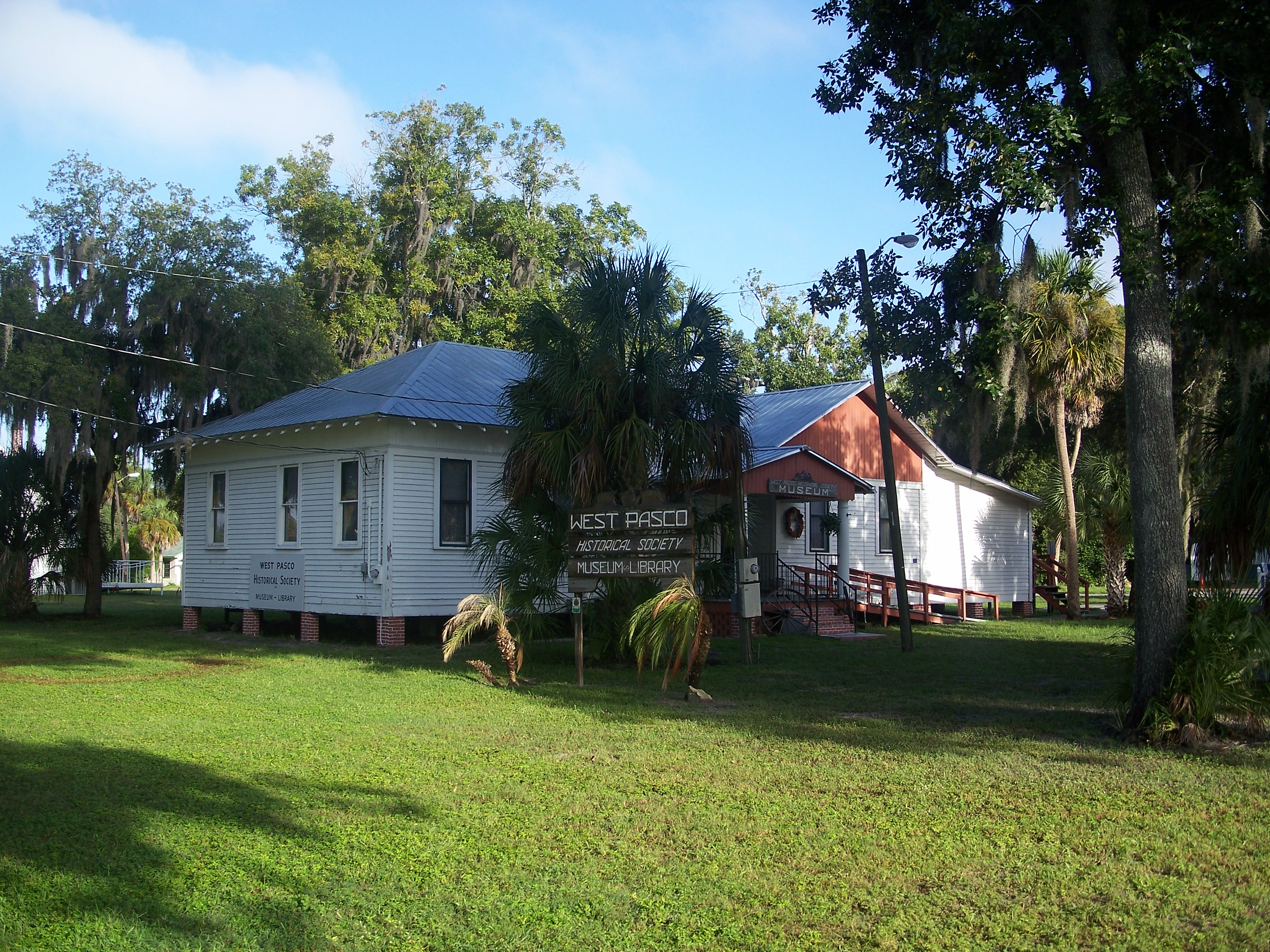

- Location within Florida
- Established: 1983
- Location: 6431 Circle Boulevard; New Port Richey, Florida
- Coordinates: 28.2520°N 82.7212°W
- Type: History museum
- Website: West Pasco Historical Society

The West Pasco Historical Society Museum and Library is located at 6431 Circle Boulevard, New Port Richey, Florida, United States. The museum's exhibits include Native American arrowhead and artifacts, clothing, household items, antiques and decorative items, tools, and historic photographs.

Elroy M. Avery's personal collection of over 1,000 books was used to help establish the Avery Library and Historical Society on April 10, 1920 (which became the New Port Richey Public Library and West Pasco Historical Society Museum and Library).

The West Pasco Historical Society was formed in 1973. In 1974-75 the organization published a hardcover history, West Pasco's Heritage. The building which houses the organization originally served as the Seven Springs schoolhouse from about 1915 to 1925. In 1981 it was moved to Sims Park and was dedicated as the home of the historical society in 1983. The library wing was added in 1992. In 2011, the museum was renamed the Rao Musunuru, M. D., Museum and Library, to honor a major donor to the project of remodeling the building.

== Accessibility ==
This museum is handicap accessible.

=== Operating Hours ===
The museum is open Fridays, Saturdays, and Sundays, from 1 to 4 p.m.

== See also ==
- List of historical societies in Florida
