= Master gardener program =

American volunteer program

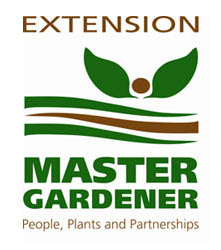
National Extension Master Gardener Logo

Master Gardener programs (also known as Extension Master Gardener Programs) are volunteer programs that train individuals in the science and art of gardening. These individuals pass on the information they learned during their training, as volunteers who advise and educate the public on gardening and horticulture.

== Background ==
The first Master Gardener program was founded in 1973 by Dr. David Gibby of Washington State University Cooperative Extension in the greater Tacoma area to meet a high demand for urban horticulture and gardening advice. The first trial clinic was held at the Tacoma Mall in 1972. When that was successful, the Master Gardener Program was officially established, a curriculum created, and training began in King County and Pierce County in 1973. The concept then spread to other U.S. states and Canadian provinces.

In the US, groups are affiliated with a land-grant university and one of its cooperative extension service offices. Canadian Master Gardener groups have different organizational structures, including incorporation as a charitable non-profit (Ontario) and universities (Saskatchewan). Typically, Master Gardeners receive extensive training and then provide information to the public via phone or email helplines, speaking at public events, writing articles for publications and the internet, and partnering with other community programs, gardens, and educational facilities.

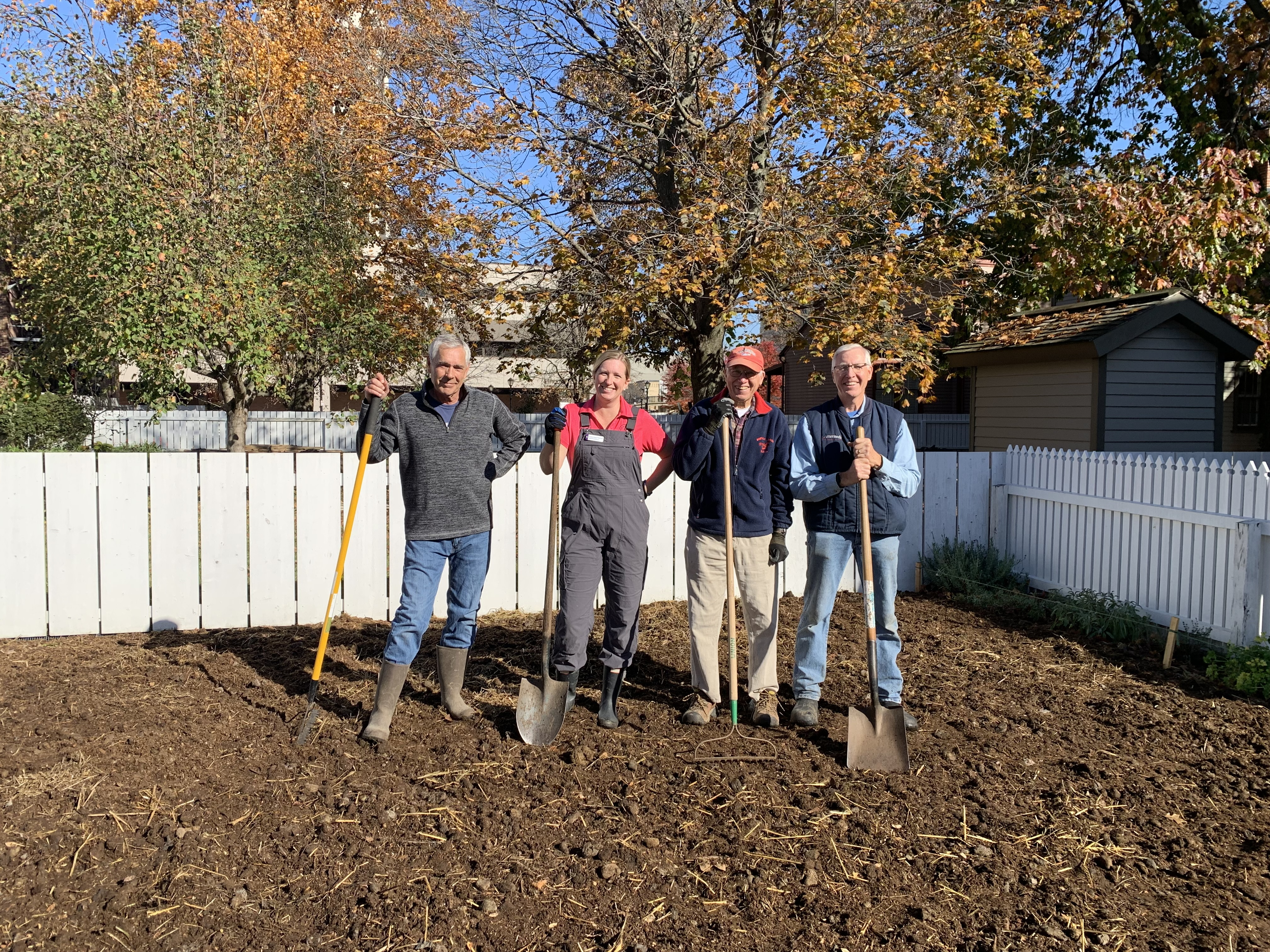
A group of volunteers from the University of Illinois Extension Master Gardener program standing in a garden with shovels.

Master Gardeners are active in all 50 states in the United States and eight Canadian provinces. According to the 2009 Extension Master Gardener Survey, there are nearly 95,000 active Extension Master Gardeners, who provide approximately 5,000,000 volunteer service hours of per year to their communities. Once volunteers are accepted into a Master Gardener program, they are trained by cooperative extension, university, and local industry specialists in subjects such as taxonomy, plant pathology, soil health, entomology, cultural growing requirements, sustainable gardening, nuisance wildlife management, and integrated pest management.

After completing training, master gardeners serve their communities by providing guidance to others and maintaining community and historic gardens. Awards are regularly presented to master gardeners for community service, innovative programs, and other topics.
