= Pithlachascotee River =

River in Florida

Pithlachascotee River "Cotee River"
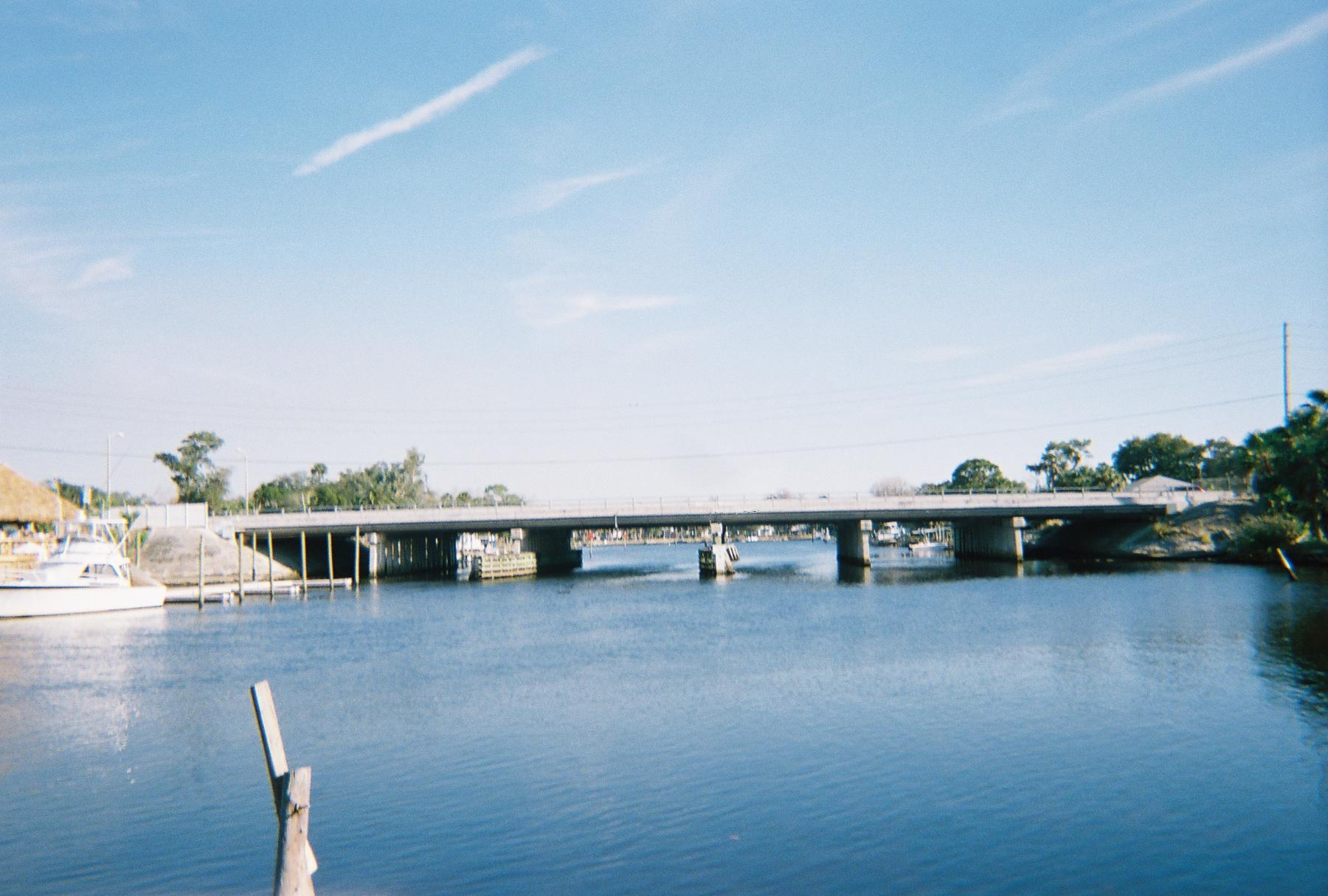
- The US 19 bridge over the Pithlachascotee River between Port Richey(left) and New Port Richey.

Location
- Country: United States
- State: Florida
- County: Pasco
- District: SWFWMD

Physical characteristics
- Source: Crews Lake Wilderness Park
  - location: Shady Hills, Florida
  - coordinates: 28°22′08″N 82°31′58″W
- Mouth: Gulf of Mexico
  - location: Port Richey, Florida
  - coordinates: 28°16′40″N 82°44′37″W
- Length: 23 mi (37 km)
- Discharge
  - location: 10.5mi upstream from mouth
  - average: 25.42 cu ft/s (0.720 m^{3}/s)

Basin features
- Tributaries
  - right: Five Mile Creek,

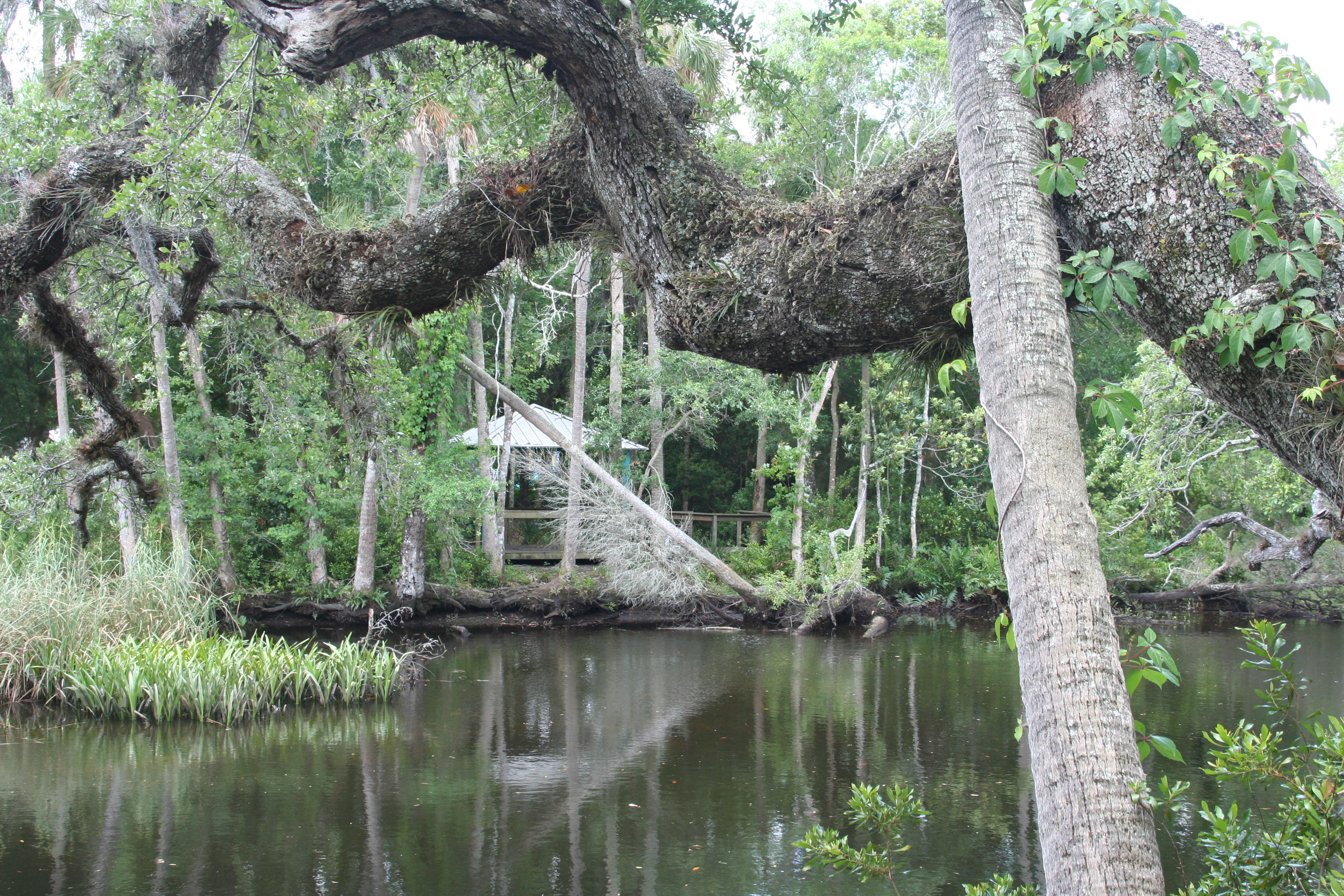
A view of the winding Pithlachascotee River from James E. Grey Preserve

The Pithlachascotee River, often called the Cotee or "Cootie" River, is a blackwater river in Pasco County, Florida.

Originating near Crews Lake, the river flows for over 23 miles (37 km) to the south and west, flowing through the Starkey Wilderness Park before turning northwest through downtown New Port Richey, entering the Gulf of Mexico at Miller's Bayou. A Florida State Canoe Trail runs along the river.

On a chart representing the west coast of Florida accompanying the annual report of the U.S. Coast Survey for 1851, the name is translated as "Boat Building River". The whole word signifies the place where canoes were chopped or dug out. The Seminole used canoes dug out of cypress trunks. It is derived from the Creek pithlo (canoe), and chaskita (to chop out).

== List of crossings ==
Crossing	Carries	Image	Location	Coordinates
Headwaters				28°22′08″N 82°31′58″W
140018	SR 52		Fivay Junction	28°19′45″N 82°32′11″W
140080; 140081	SR 589; Suncoast Parkway			28°18′33″N 82°33′01″W
Confluence with Five Mile Creek			Sernova Tract	
	power line road		Sernova Tract	28°17′33″N 82°35′05″W
	CR 524; Ridge Road		Sernova Tract	28°16′45″N 82°35′32″W
	Wilderness Road		Sernova Tract	28°15′25″N 82°38′35″W
144048	Starkey Boulevard		New Port Richey	28°15′20″N 82°39′03″W
144026; 144050	CR 1 Little Road		New Port Richey	28°14′23″N 82°40′26″W
ford?	Nova Court		New Port Richey	28°14′13″N 82°41′14″W
144025; 144049	CR 77; Rowan Road		New Port Richey	28°14′15″N 82°41′38″W
140064	Madison Street		New Port Richey	28°14′30″N 82°42′56″W
140050	CR 595; Grand Boulevard		New Port Richey	28°14′24″N 82°43′10″W
140021	CR 595A; Main Street		New Port Richey	28°15′01″N 82°43′22″W
140005	US 19		Port Richey	28°16′10″N 82°43′33″W
Outflow of Miller's Bayou				28°16′21″N 82°43′40″W
Mouth				28°16′40″N 82°44′37″W
