= New Port Richey, Florida =

City in Pasco County, Florida, United States

- City
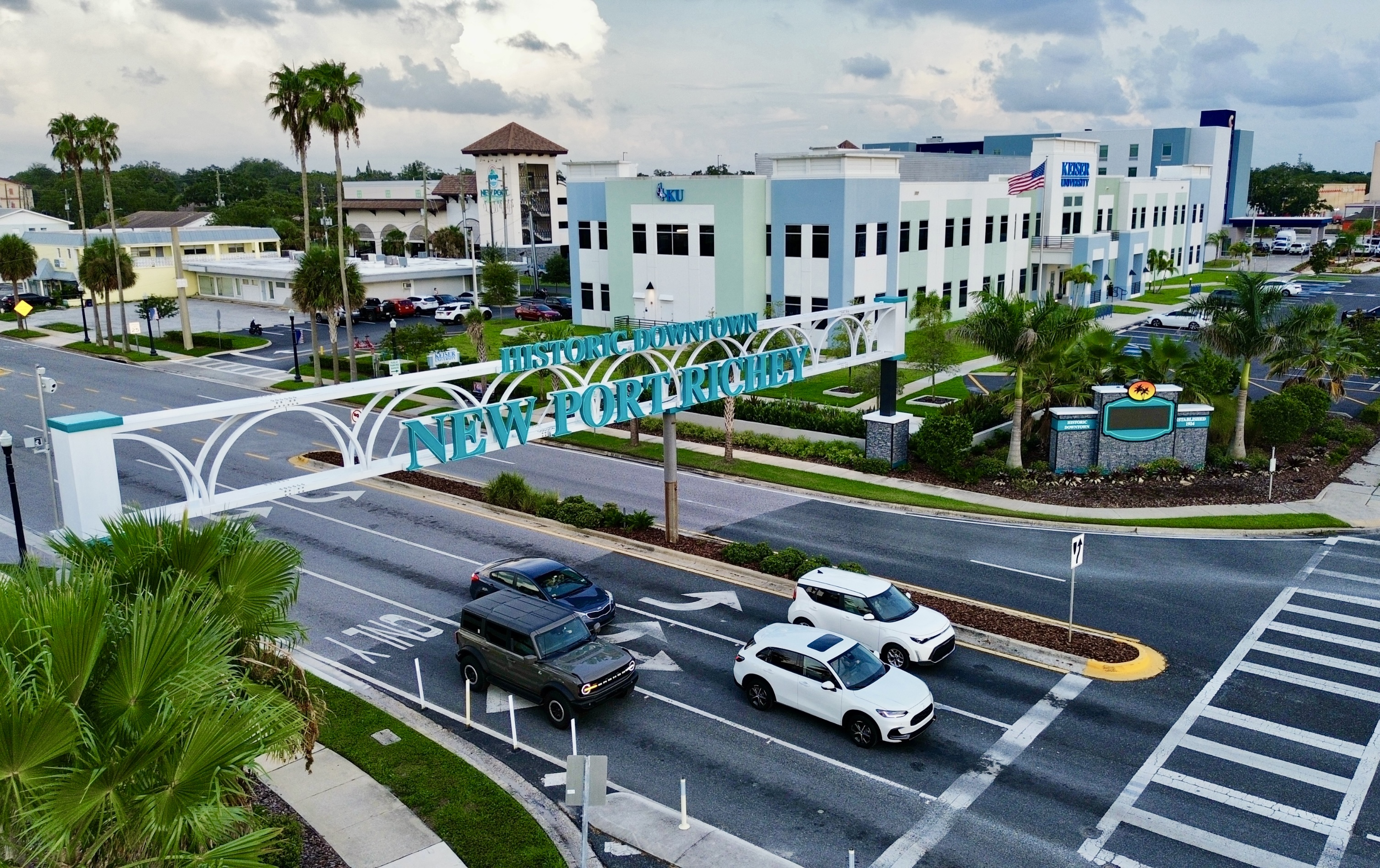
- Historic Downtown New Port Richey archway sign over Main Street.

- Seal

- Location in Pasco County and the state of Florida
- Coordinates: 28°15′04″N 82°43′02″W
- Country: United States
- State: Florida
- County: Pasco

Government
  - Type: Council-Manager
  - Mayor: Chopper Davis
  - Deputy Mayor: Kelly Mothershead
  - Council Members: Peter Altman, Matt Murphy, and Bertrell Butler IV
  - City Manager: Debbie L. Manns
  - City Clerk: Judy Meyers

Area
  - Total: 4.61 sq mi (11.93 km^{2})
  - Land: 4.56 sq mi (11.80 km^{2})
  - Water: 0.050 sq mi (0.13 km^{2})
- Elevation: 20 ft (6.1 m)

Population (2020)
  - Total: 16,728
  - Density: 3,672.1/sq mi (1,417.82/km^{2})
- Time zone: UTC-5 (Eastern (EST))
  - Summer (DST): UTC-4 (EDT)
- ZIP codes: 34652-34656
- Area code: 727
- FIPS code: 12-48500
- GNIS feature ID: 2404365
- Website: City of New Port Richey

New Port Richey is a city in Pasco County, Florida, United States. It is a suburban city included in the Tampa-St. Petersburg-Clearwater, Florida Metropolitan Statistical Area. The population is estimated at about 18,811 as of 2026.

== History ==
By 1914 the area around Orange Lake was being called "New Port Richey" and the older part of Port Richey was called "Old Port Richey." On February 20, 1915 an application was made for a separate post office in New Port Richey. Later the same year the post office was established for the residents of the southern part of Port Richey. The post office was named New Port Richey, and the name became official. The first postmaster was Gerben DeVries. The growth of the city came about after George Sims purchased the Port Richey Land Company. He built a home in New Port Richey in 1916.

The first Chasco Fiesta was held in 1922. It included a pageant where they reenacted the DeValla expedition. The fiesta was an annual event until World War II. The fiesta was revived in 1945 by the Junior Women's Club. The event was fully revived in 1947 when the Chasco Club handed the festival over to the city.

On October 24, 1924, New Port Richey was incorporated. The first mayor was Dr. Elroy M. Avery, an educator, historian, and prolific author who came to New Port Richey from Cleveland after he retired in 1919.

The first act of the city council was on December 2, 1924. In the act, city council accepted Enchantment Park as a gift from George Sims. The park was renamed Sims Park.

In the mid-1920s the city hoped to become a winter home for Hollywood stars. In fact, Thomas Meighan, a leading actor in silent movies, built a large home on the river in 1928 and spent the winters there. He hoped to make movies in New Port Richey. Gene Sarazen, one of the top golfers in the 1920s, also built a home in New Port Richey. He invented the modern sand wedge in a garage in New Port Richey. Other Hollywood figures such as Ed Wynn visited New Port Richey. Songwriter Irving Berlin and bandleader Paul Whiteman made down payments on property, but did not build homes. In 1926, a new theater named for Thomas Meighan opened, and in 1927, the Hacienda Hotel, a 55-room Spanish-style luxury hotel, was completed. Moon Lake Gardens and Dude Ranch, which featured a private game preserve of 7,000 acres, opened in the 1930s.

The end of the 1920s Florida land boom ended the aspirations of New Port Richey to become a haven for Hollywood celebrities, and the Great Depression had a devastating effect on the town. By 1938 the town had lost its Tarpon Springs Branch passenger train connection to the Seaboard Air Line Railway network, a significant loss in the era before Interstates and jet airplanes.

Beginning in the late 1960s, western Pasco County began a decades-long period of rapid population growth, although the population of New Port Richey has not increased much because of the small area which makes up the city. Most of the population of western Pasco County is in unincorporated areas.

Pasco-Hernando State College began offering classes in New Port Richey in 1972, and completed construction of a campus in 1976. Gulf View Square shopping mall opened in 1980.

In 1995, New Port Richey became sister cities with Cavalaire-sur-Mer on the French Riviera. Cavalaire Square in downtown was named in honor of that relationship. In 2004 President George W. Bush, campaigning for re-election, spoke to supporters in Sims Park.

== Geography ==
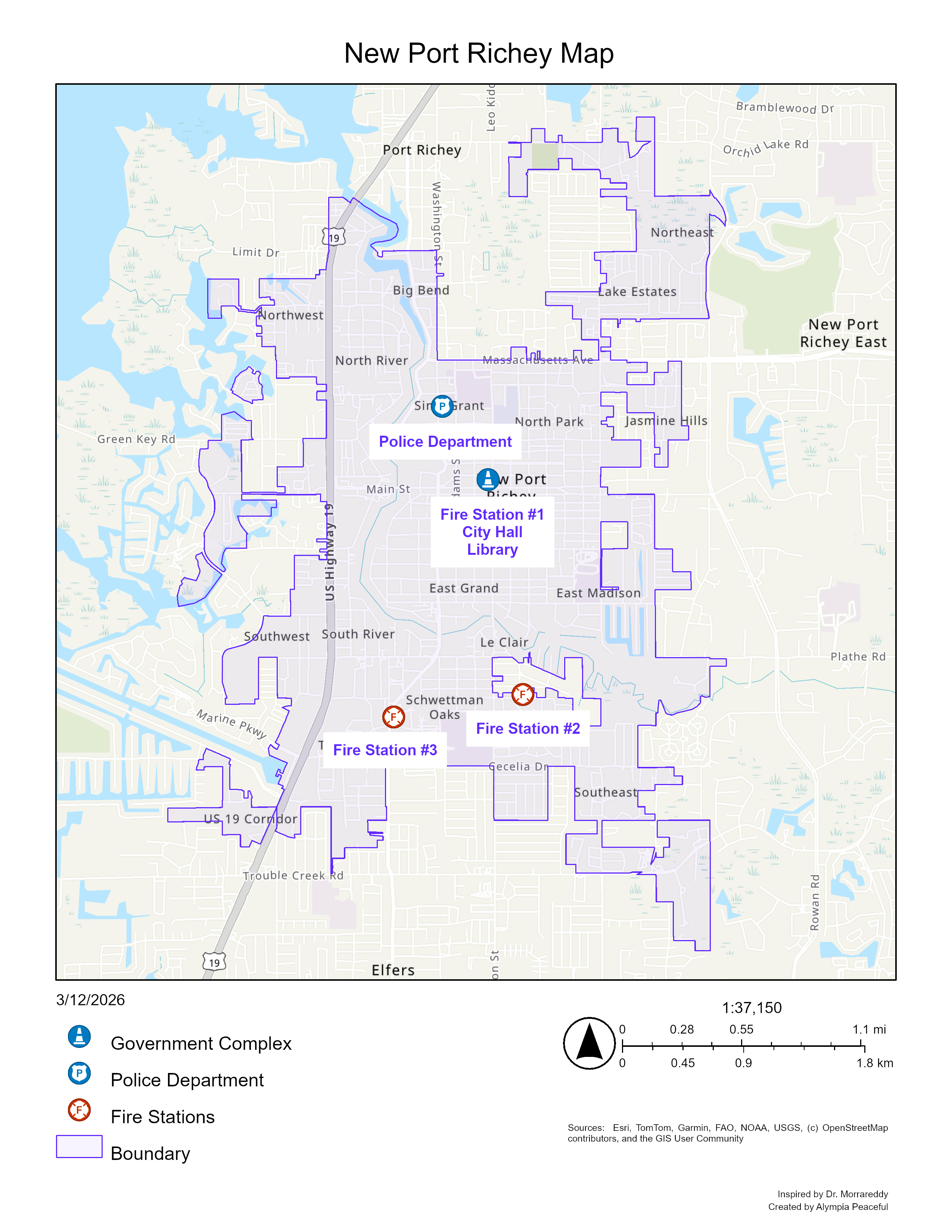
New Port Richey Map

According to the United States Census Bureau, the city has a total area of 4.6 square miles (12 km^{2}), of which 4.5 square miles (12 km^{2}) is land and 0.1 square miles (0.26 km^{2}) (1.53%) is water.

The Pithlachascotee River flows through the downtown area on its way to the Gulf of Mexico.

== Demographics ==
Historical population
Census	Pop.	Note	%±
1930	758		—
1940	920		21.4%
1950	1,512		64.3%
1960	3,520		132.8%
1970	6,098		73.2%
1980	11,196		83.6%
1990	14,044		25.4%
2000	16,117		14.8%
2010	14,911		−7.5%
2020	16,728		12.2%
U.S. Decennial Census

=== Racial and ethnic composition ===
New Port Richey racial composition (Hispanics excluded from racial categories) (NH = Non-Hispanic)
Race	Pop 2010	Pop 2020	% 2010	% 2020
White (NH)	12,289	12,447	82.42%	74.41%
Black or African American (NH)	387	731	2.60%	4.37%
Native American or Alaska Native (NH)	54	62	0.36%	0.37%
Asian (NH)	211	234	1.42%	1.40%
Pacific Islander or Native Hawaiian (NH)	3	13	0.02%	0.08%
Some other race (NH)	20	70	0.13%	0.42%
Two or more races/Multiracial (NH)	276	731	1.85%	4.37%
Hispanic or Latino (any race)	1,671	2,440	11.21%	14.59%
Total	14,911	16,728		

=== 2020 census ===
As of the 2020 census, New Port Richey had a population of 16,728. The median age was 50.8 years. 16.3% of residents were under the age of 18 and 27.3% of residents were 65 years of age or older. For every 100 females there were 89.9 males, and for every 100 females age 18 and over there were 88.8 males age 18 and over.

100.0% of residents lived in urban areas, while 0.0% lived in rural areas.

There were 7,755 households in New Port Richey, of which 20.3% had children under the age of 18 living in them. Of all households, 31.3% were married-couple households, 24.0% were households with a male householder and no spouse or partner present, and 35.0% were households with a female householder and no spouse or partner present. About 38.6% of all households were made up of individuals and 18.9% had someone living alone who was 65 years of age or older.

There were 8,967 housing units, of which 13.5% were vacant. The homeowner vacancy rate was 3.7% and the rental vacancy rate was 7.1%.

=== 2020 ACS 5-year estimate ===
The 2020 American Community Survey 5-year estimates reported 4,145 families residing in the city.

=== 2010 census ===
As of the 2010 United States census, there were 14,911 people, 7,030 households, and 3,624 families residing in the city.

== Economy ==
=== Top employers ===
According to New Port Richey's (2021) Comprehensive Annual Financial Report, the top employers in the city were:

#	Employer	# of Employees
1	North Bay Hospital/Morton Plant	806
2	Baycare Behavioral Health, Inc.	332
3	Madison Pointe Rehab & Health	186
4	Orchard Ridge Nursing Center	156
5	Med-Fleet Systems, Inc.	152
6	Cracker Barrel	121
7	Publix Supermarket #1020 (Southgate)	136
8	Heather Hills Nursing Home	119
9	Applicant Insight, Inc.	118

== Arts and culture ==
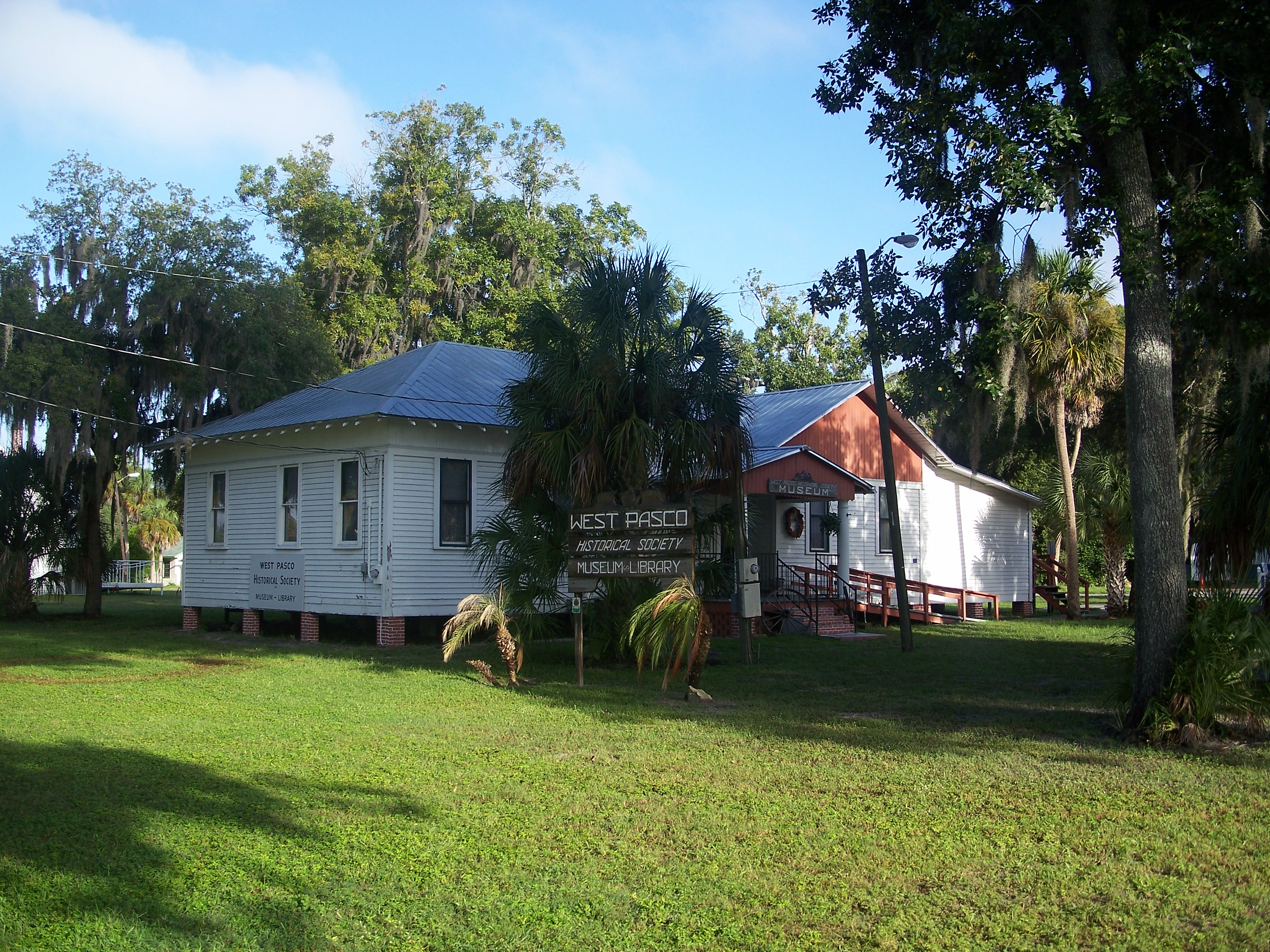
West Pasco Historical Society Museum and Library

=== Libraries ===
- New Port Richey Public Library
- Regency Park Branch Library

=== Museums ===
- West Pasco Historical Society Museum and Library, located in a historic schoolhouse.
- MAPS Museum

== Parks and recreation ==
- Cotee River Park
- Frances Avenue Park
- Grand Boulevard Park
- James E. Grey Preserve
- Jasmin Park
- Meadow Dog Park
- Peace Hall
- Recreation and Aquatics Center
- Sims Park and Orange Lake
- Sims Park Boat Ramp

== Education ==
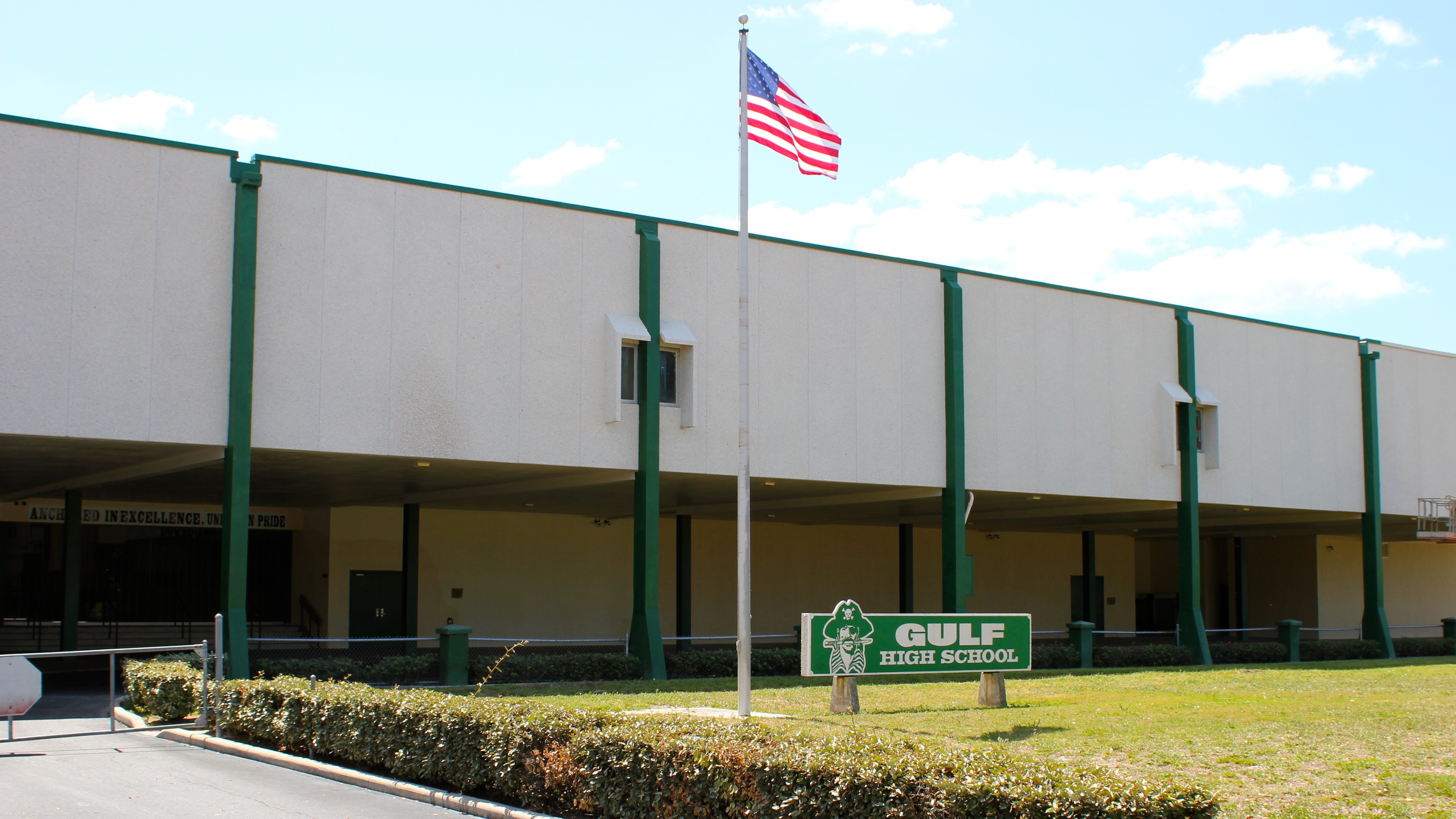
Gulf High School

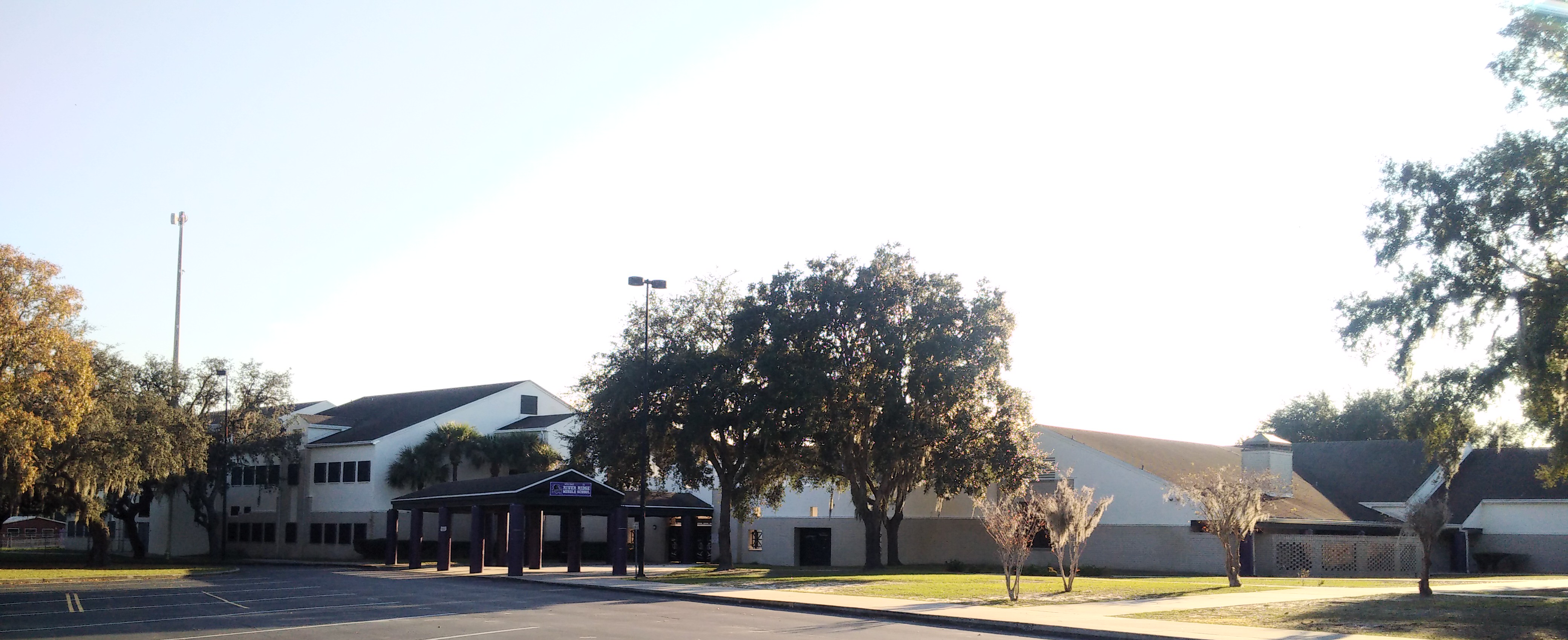
River Ridge High School

Public education is administered by Pasco County Schools.

Elementary schools:

- Achieve Center at Richey
- Calusa Elementary School
- Cotee River Elementary School
- Cypress Elementary School
- Deer Park Elementary School
- James M. Marlowe Elementary School
- Longleaf Elementary School
- Richey Elementary School
- Schrader Elementary School

Middle schools:

- Gulf Middle School
- River Ridge Middle School

High schools:

- Gulf High School
- Wendell Krinn Technical High School
- River Ridge High School

Charter schools:

- Athenian Academy of Technology and The Arts
- Learning Lodge Academy
- Pepin Academies, Pasco
- Plato Academy Trinity Charter School

=== Colleges and universities ===
- Pasco–Hernando State College
- Marchman Technical College
- Keiser University (satellite campus)

== Infrastructure ==
=== Public safety ===
==== Fire and medical services ====
The New Port Richey Fire Department has two fire stations in the city. Pasco County Fire Rescue covers all emergency medical services.

==== Police ====
The New Port Richey Police Department has 46 sworn officers, 26 civilian employees, and several part-time officers.

== Notable people ==
- Joshua Colley, actor and singer
- R. C. Enerson, racing driver
- Leon Orr, former American football player
- Josiah Queen, American Contemporary Christian Musician
- Chris Trousdale (1985–2020), actor and singer
