= Fish Hawk Creek Preserve =

Nature preserve in Florida, U.S.

- Location within Florida
- Location: Tampa, Florida
- Coordinates: 27.828°N 82.236°W
- Operator: Hillsborough County's Conservation and Environmental Lands Management Department

Fish Hawk Creek Nature Preserve is a 3,286-acre (1,330 ha) nature preserve in Hillsborough County, Florida. The preserve is managed by Hillsborough County's Conservation and Environmental Lands Management Department and is located along the riparian corridor of Fish Hawk Creek, a significant tributary of the Alafia River. As a result, the acquisition and protection of the Fish Hawk Creek Nature Preserve has provided an essential link in assuring the long-term protection of a significant regional habitat corridor. Restoration projects have been initiated on the property. Habitats include pine flatwoods, sandhill, Florida scrub, and creek corridors. The preserve is bisected by Fish Hawk Blvd. and is identified by a north and a south section. The north section of the preserve includes a 2.2-mile (3.5 km) hiking trail and can be accessed through Lithia Springs Regional Park in Lithia, Florida. The south portion of the preserve can be accessed through a parking area near the intersection of Boyette Rd. and Balm Rd. and includes a 2-mile (3.2 km) hiking trail.

== See also ==
- Alafia River Corridor Preserve
- Southwest Florida Water Management District
- Florida state forests
- List of Florida state parks
