= Fish Hawk, Florida =

Fishhawk, Florida Fish Hawk
- Census-designated place
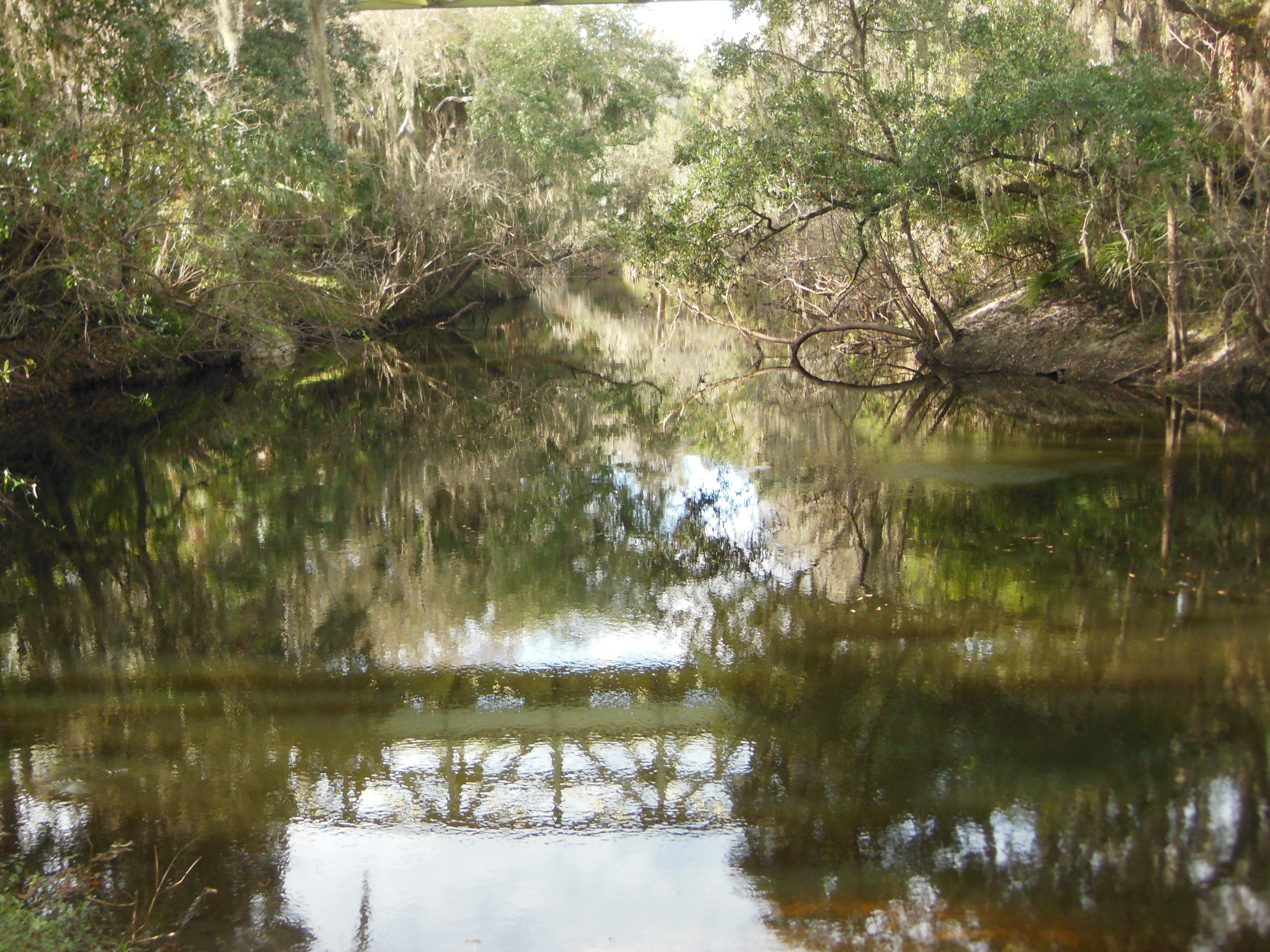
- Alafia River

- Location in Hillsborough County and the state of Florida
- Coordinates: 27°51′40″N 82°12′51″W
- Country: United States
- State: Florida
- County: Hillsborough

Government
  - Type: Community development district

Area
  - Total: 16.38 sq mi (42.43 km^{2})
  - Land: 16.22 sq mi (42.00 km^{2})
  - Water: 0.17 sq mi (0.43 km^{2})
- Elevation: 46 ft (14 m)

Population (2020)
  - Total: 24,625
  - Density: 1,518.6/sq mi (586.35/km^{2})
- Time zone: UTC-5 (Eastern (EST))
  - Summer (DST): UTC-4 (EDT)
- ZIP Code: 33547
- Area code: 813
- FIPS code: 12-22387
- GNIS feature ID: 2402482

Fish Hawk (or FishHawk) is an unincorporated area and census-designated place (CDP) in Hillsborough County, Florida, United States. It is a suburb of Tampa, and includes a portion of the community of Lithia. As of the 2020 census, the CDP had a population of 24,625. The place name is derived from Little Fishhawk Creek, a tributary of the Alafia River that joins the Alafia just west of Lithia Springs.

== Geography ==
FishHawk is located in east-central Hillsborough County, bordered to the north by the Alafia River, which separates it from Valrico to the north and Bloomingdale to the northwest. Boyette road borders Fish Hawk from the south and Riverview to the southwest. FishHawk is 20 miles (32 km) southeast of downtown Tampa. The older community of Lithia is in the eastern part of the CDP.

According to the United States Census Bureau, the CDP has a total area of 16.4 square miles (42.4 km^{2}), with 16.2 square miles (42.0 km^{2}) of land and 0.2 square miles (0.4 km^{2}), or 1.03%, of water.

== Description ==
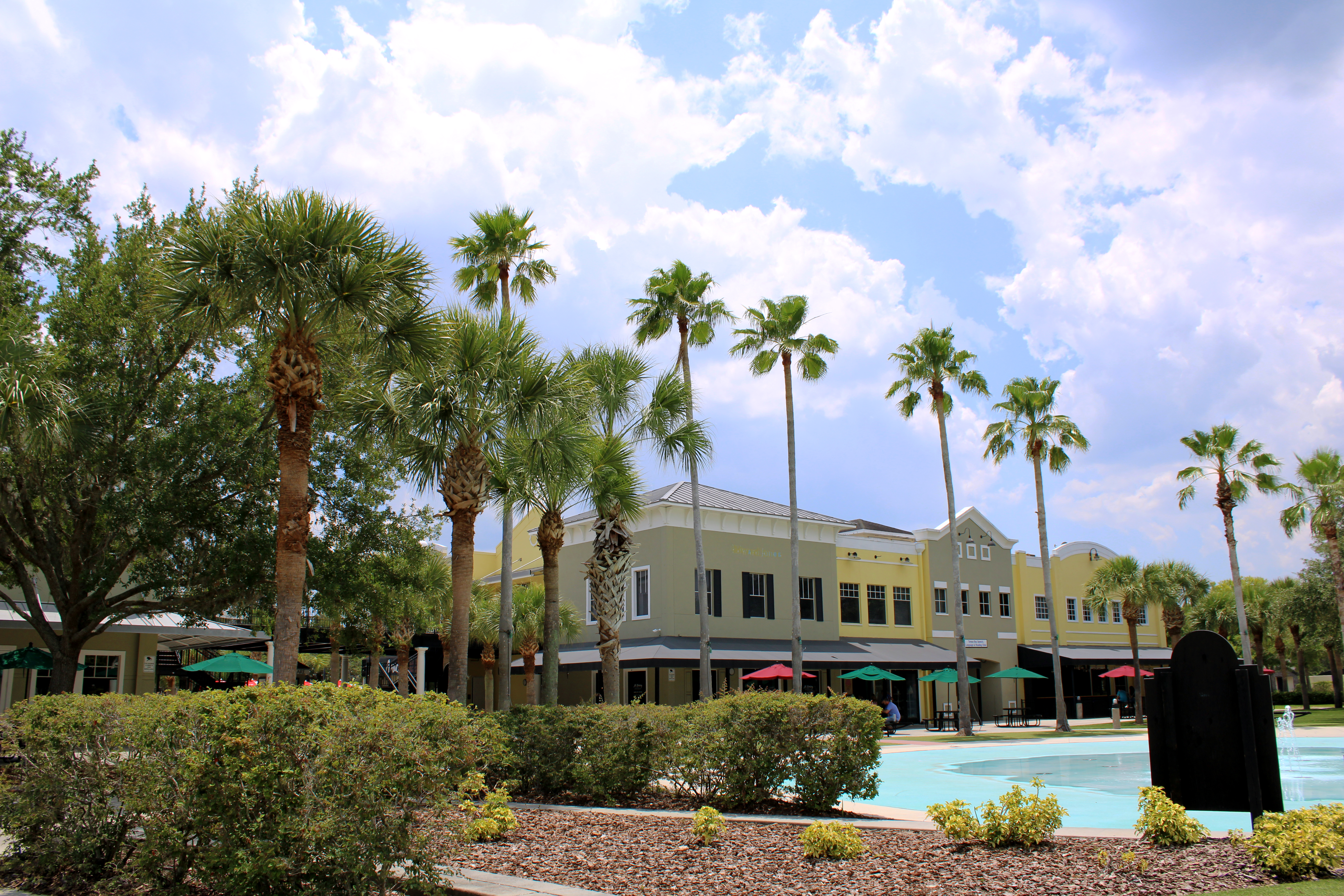
Park Square Plaza in Fishhawk Ranch.

FishHawk Ranch by Newland Communities is a planned community composed of several distinct villages over 3,000+ acres. FishHawk Ranch contains several public common areas including the Park Square Town Center, the Lake House, the Palmetto Club clubhouse, the Osprey Club, the Aquatic Center, biking/walking trails, community swimming pools, gym facilities, tennis courts, lakes, and ponds. FishHawk Ranch was the first certified green new-home community in Hillsborough County. The community is part of a Community Development District and residents pay a CDD fee for their respective CDD designation or subdivision.

The FishHawk area is also noted for its high-ranking, A-rated schools.

== History ==
FishHawk Trails and FishHawk Ranch formerly operated as a ranch; these two subdivisions were built by two different companies in the 1990s.

Before these subdivisions were constructed, FishHawk Trails was a wooded location through which a CSX Transportation rail track path passed. The rail tracks were removed in the late 1980s. There was once a train station in the FishHawk area that was the main import/export area of supplies, mail, and food for Lithia residents.

== Environmental impact ==
Starling at FishHawk and The Preserve were previously an undeveloped wildlife habitat. The Florida Green Building Coalition has named FishHawk as a "green" community, the first in Hillsborough County and the largest in the Tampa area. In 2003, the National Arbor Day Foundation honored the FishHawk community preservation efforts.

== Demographics ==
Historical population
Census	Pop.	Note	%±
2000	1,991		—
2010	14,087		607.5%
2020	24,625		74.8%

=== 2020 census ===
As of the 2020 census, Fish Hawk had a population of 24,625 and 7,745 housing units; the population density was 1,518.7 inhabitants per square mile. Housing units were 4.1% vacant, including a homeowner vacancy rate of 1.4% and a rental vacancy rate of 4.2%.

There were 7,431 households in Fish Hawk, of which 60.6% had children under the age of 18 living in them. Of all households, 72.8% were married-couple households, 7.6% were households with a male householder and no spouse or partner present, and 16.3% were households with a female householder and no spouse or partner present. About 10.5% of all households were made up of individuals and 4.5% had someone living alone who was 65 years of age or older.

The median age was 37.0 years. 34.6% of residents were under the age of 18 and 9.0% of residents were 65 years of age or older. For every 100 females there were 95.5 males, and for every 100 females age 18 and over there were 90.0 males age 18 and over.

91.4% of residents lived in urban areas, while 8.6% lived in rural areas.

Racial composition as of the 2020 census
Race	Number	Percent
White	17,600	71.5%
Black or African American	1,142	4.6%
American Indian and Alaska Native	52	0.2%
Asian	1,562	6.3%
Native Hawaiian and Other Pacific Islander	12	0.0%
Some other race	819	3.3%
Two or more races	3,438	14.0%
Hispanic or Latino (of any race)	3,872	15.7%

=== 2010 census ===
The area was transformed by development throughout the following decade, with the population growing over 700%, from under 2,000 to 14,087 in the 2010 US census, while the median household income also increased dramatically from $65,857 to $107,250. To accommodate the rapid growth, the Hillsborough County School District opened several new schools in the area, including Newsome High School in 2003.

=== 2000 census ===
At the time of the 2000 US Census, there were 1,991 people, 678 households, and 581 families residing in the community. The population density was 121.8 inhabitants per square mile (47.0/km^{2}). There were 798 housing units at an average density of 48.8 per square mile (18.8/km^{2}). The racial makeup of the community was 91.41% White, 4.12% Black, 0.15% Native American, 0.80% Asian, 2.06% from other races, and 1.46% from two or more races. Hispanic or Latino of any race were 6.08% of the population.

There were 678 households, out of which 43.4% had children under the age of 18 living with them, 76.0% were married couples living together, 6.9% had a female householder with no husband present, and 14.3% were non-families. 10.6% of all households were made up of individuals, and 2.7% had someone living alone who was 65 years of age or older. The average household size was 2.94 and the average family size was 3.16.

In the community, the population was spread out, with 29.6% under the age of 18, 5.6% from 18 to 24, 35.7% from 25 to 44, 23.1% from 45 to 64, and 6.0% who were 65 years of age or older. The median age was 35 years. For every 100 females, there were 98.5 males. For every 100 females age 18 and over, there were 96.4 males.

The median income for a household in the community was $65,857, and the median income for a family was $67,286. Males had a median income of $42,321 versus $35,662 for females. The per capita income for the community was $26,540. About 2.0% of families and 3.3% of the population were below the poverty line, including 3.6% of those under age 18 and none of those age 65 or over.

=== Ancestry ===
The ancestry of Fish Hawk was 10.8% German, 8.5% English, 7.6% Irish, 6.7% Italian, 2.5% Polish, 2.5% Scottish, 2.2% French, 2.0% Norwegian, and 0.3% Sub-saharan African.

=== Income ===
The median household income was $119,946, with families having $127,659, married couples having $142,572, and non-families having $65,000. A total of 8.7% of the population were in poverty, with 9.9% of people under 18, 8.7% of people between the ages of 18 and 64, and 3.1% of people 65 or older were in poverty. The per capita income was $44,431.

== Education ==
Schools:

- Barrington Middle School (Public, 6–8)
- Bevis Elementary (Public, K-5)
- Bell Creek Academy (Charter, 6–9)
- FishHawk Creek Elementary (Public, K-5)
- Foundation Christian Academy (Private, Churches of Christ, K-12)
- Lithia Springs Elementary (Public, K-5)
- Newsome High School (Public, 9–12)
- Pinecrest Elementary (Public, K-5)
- Randall Middle School (Public, 6–8)
- St. Stephen's Catholic School (Private, Catholic, K-12)
- Dick Stowers Elementary (Public, K-5)
- Valrico Lake Advantage Academy (Charter, K-5)
