= Water wars in Florida =

According to the Natural Resources Defense Council's recent study, Florida is one of 14 states predicted to face "high risk" water shortages by the year 2050. The state's water is primarily drawn from the Floridan Aquifer as well as from the St. Johns River, the Suwannee River, and the Ocklawaha River. Florida's regional water conflicts stem primarily from the fact that the majority of the fresh water supply is found in the rural north, while the bulk of the population, and therefore water consumption, resides in the south. Metropolitan municipalities in central and south Florida have neared their aquifer extraction limit of 650 million US gallons (2,500,000 m^{3}) per day, leading to the search for new, extra-regional sources.

== North-South water conflict ==
=== Background ===
In 2003, a committee predominantly composed of real estate developers was appointed by Governor Jeb Bush to solve Florida's water disparity. Members were selected from the lobby group Council of 100 and in a 2003 report proposed "a system that enables water distribution from water-rich areas to water-poor areas," or the transfer of water through pipelines from the state's northern regions to its more developed and drier southern cities. The Suwannee river region was declared by committee member Lee Arnold to be "sitting in the Saudi Arabia of water." Representatives, citizens, and groups, such as the Florida Wildlife Federation, across the state argued that Governor Bush curb development in the south as opposed to further contributing to the water imbalance and restricting municipal water use even more. Half the state's fresh water is consumed by South Florida, which includes Miami-Dade County, Broward County, and Palm Beach County as well as the majority of the state's agricultural land, golf courses, and swimming pools. Legally, water in Florida is owned by the state, with five water management districts overseeing its regional use and distribution. State law allows the transfer of water from one region to another, but it stipulates this action as a region's last resort.

=== Resolution ===
The council's report offered an incentive for northern regions to transfer water south, suggesting that excess supply may be sold for profit. However, Floridians responded with slogans such as "Our water is not for sale!" Ultimately, more than 30 of the state's counties passed resolutions against the proposal, citing various concerns including overpopulation, uncontrolled development, sink holes, spring depletion, and salinization of groundwater supplies. As a result of the public's negative reaction towards the water-transfer proposal, Governor Bush rejected the Council's report. Instead, millions of dollars have been allocated to water development projects. The South Florida Water Management District plans to restore parts of the Everglades to ensure a continual water supply for its region.

== Tampa Bay conflict ==
The Tampa Bay water war is a conflict between Hillsborough County, Pasco County, Pinellas County, New Port Richey, St. Petersburg, and Tampa that has been going on since the 1970s over water supply. The Southwest Florida Water Management District is another key player. Created in 1961, it is a district in charge of 10,000 square miles (26,000 km^{2}) over 16 counties; it has the responsibility to meet the water needs of all water users while additionally handling water resources efficiently. The West Coast Regional Water Supply Authority was created to handle the water efficiently.

=== History ===
By the early 1990s, the Tampa Bay area had failed to effectively collaborate on sharing their water resources. Eleven regional groundwater facilities serve nearly 90% of the water demand for the Tampa Bay Area. By legislative acts, Hillsborough, Pasco and Pinellas counties were required to work together collectively on a regional water system that would be more effective for using their water in a more environmentally safe and productive way. The group that was formed is West Coast Regional Water Supply Authority. Conflict arose over pumping rights as seen with Pinellas County continuing to purchase wells in Pasco County, and therefore using water before Pasco County inhabitants used their County's water. This also displayed the issue that water was owned traditionally by the land owners and permission was needed to use ground and surface water from the areas. Landowners were having major problems with the new sharing of sources and caused new litigation problems. A solution was made in 1991 when Pasco County was awarded the right to use their water first while allowing Pinellas County unlimited access to two well fields. Pinellas County continued to cause conflict by refusing to fund alternative water sources and prevented the development of such innovations. This caused further litigation between West Coast Regional Water Supply Authority and Southwest Florida Water Management District from 1994 to 1998 that resulted in zero progress for development in alternatives. The current Tampa Bay Water company cites in its history that the main reason behind zero development within the WCRWSA was that its members were unequally in control of water facilities, thus causing no unification on who was developing alternatives.

With the combined problems of property impacts cited by homeowners, Pinellas County funded a campaign to advertise that the water scarcity issues were from drought not overpumping of aquifers, which was suspected of them. The solution to these litigation battles was the Florida Legislature demanding restructuring of the institutions at play and West Coast Regional Water Supply Authority became Tampa Bay Water by the Northern Tampa Bay New Water Supply and Ground Water Withdrawal Reduction Agreement in 1997. They would receive funding from the Southwest Florida Water Management District in order to research and develop new water sourcing alternatives.

=== Tampa Bay today ===
The regions today are receiving water from three sources: ground water, desalinated seawater and river water. The three sources from the configuration plan made in 1998 were supposed to meet the Tampa Bay's needs until 2012. Their water sources include Alafia River, Hillsborough River, Tampa Bypass Canal, and Tampa Bay Seawater Desalination Plant. Tampa Bay Seawater Desalination Plant was originally issued for building in 1997, but after many delays in construction as well as performance failures, it was not fully functioning until 2007. It is currently providing 25 million US gallons (95,000 m^{3}) a day.

=== Future plans ===
Tampa Bay Water has put together plans that are being explored from 2009 to 2013. Here is a list of some of the plans for the future:

- Gulf Coast Seawater Desalination Plant - an additional desalination plant is a possibility that has the potential to provide 9 million to 25 million US gallons (95,000 m^{3}) per day.
- Northern Tampa Bay Wellfields - This would increase the availability and allowance of using wellfields as a source of water.
- Small Footprint Reverse Osmosis in Pinellas County - Requires monitoring reverse osmosis and desalination techniques used in Tarpon Springs and Oldsmar. If the cities do not continue with their plans, Tampa Bay Water would consider using it for regional plans.
- Surface and Recharge Water Projects – Entails using additional water from Alafia River and Bullfrog Creek, reviewing additional surface water storage and possibly using reclaimed water.
- Tampa Bay Seawater Desalination Plant Expansion - Involves increasing the plant by 10 million US gallons (38,000 m^{3}) a day.
- Thonotosassa Wells - Plans to research and evaluate whether this is an additional plausible source for future water needs.

=== Current conflicts ===
Although the counties are now successfully united under Tampa Bay Water, within the last year there have still been reported water shortages. The region's water supplies have dipped dangerously low and newer stricter precautions have been forced onto citizens for using water. Even with the plans for future water sources, it seems that with the growing population in the region and increasingly dry seasons, water scarcity is still a pressing issue.

== Apalachicola-Chattahoochee-Flint water war ==
=== Background ===
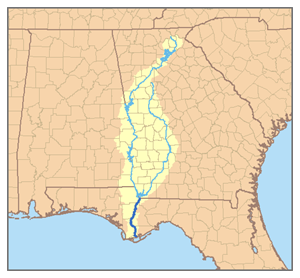
Map of the Apalachicola-Chattahoochee-Flint watershed

The three rivers involved are part of the ACF River Basin which stretches from northern Georgia down to Eastern Alabama and the Florida panhandle. The Chattahoochee River is fed mostly from surface water and has its origins in Georgia near Atlanta. It flows southwesterly crossing over the Alabama border and then merging with the Flint River near the Florida border to form the Apalachicola River. The Flint River also has its origins near Atlanta and heads southward but is fed by groundwater and has a lower flow than the Chattahoochee. The water from the Flint river is used mostly for agricultural purposes, while the water from the Chattahoochee is used mostly for municipal purposes. Florida depends on the freshwater of the Apalachicola River to mix with the salt water of the Gulf of Mexico in Apalachicola Bay. The $70 million oyster industry in Florida is concentrated in Apalachicola Bay and is very sensitive to salinity levels in the bay.

=== Conflict ===
The Apalachicola-Chattahoochee-Flint water war originated in the 1980s over a water rights dispute between Georgia, Alabama, and Florida. In 1986, Georgia suffered from a drought that lowered the levels of the Chattahoochee River and Lake Lanier to dangerously low levels, so low that the dam was not able to produce enough electricity for nearby Atlanta. As a result, in 1989, the United States Army Corps of Engineers proposed a 50% increase in water withdrawal from the river to provide fresh water to Atlanta's growing population. Out of fear that the river would not be able to maintain such use, Alabama filed a suit against the Army Corps of Engineers in 1990 because they had not assessed the environmental effects of this proposal. Both Alabama and Florida were concerned about the proposal's effect on water quantity and quality downstream. Both states believed the flow would slow to a point that would damage their ability to provide hydroelectricity and maintain growth. They also believed freshwater withdrawal would increase the flow from pollution from upstream, which was a serious problem for Florida especially because of the oyster industry. By the end of the year, Florida had joined the suit, and the Apalachicola-Chattahoochee-Flint water war became a tri-state conflict. In order to stay the suit, the federal government proposed the Apalachicola-Chattahoochee-Flint Comprehensive Water Resources Study to analyze fully the effects of the proposed withdrawal and to assess the needs of the basin as a whole. Although the Army Corps of Engineers originally claimed they had enough information initially, it took an additional eight years to complete the study.

=== Resolution attempts ===
In 1992, the three states decided to remove the dispute from the legal courtroom until the Army Corps of Engineers study was completed. In the meantime, water withdrawal levels were frozen and any changes had to be approved by all three states. When the study was completed in 1997, Alabama, Georgia, and Florida created a bill called the Apalachicola-Chattahoochee-Flint River Basin Compact, which was introduced to each state legislature and to the United States Congress. The Apalachicola-Chattahoochee-Flint compact allowed each state to review the Army Corps of Engineers study and then come to an agreement about water allocation by December 31, 1998. The bill was ratified by all three state legislatures and by the U.S. Congress later that year. Because of the gubernatorial elections in all three states in 1998, they decided to extend the deadline to December 31, 1999, and because of an issue with the Alabamian governor, the deadline was extended yet again to May 1, 2000. At this point, Florida was becoming increasingly frustrated with the lack of progress and with the fact that Georgia would simply not agree to any minimum flow restrictions. The deadline was extended once more to August 1, 2000.

Between 1999 and 2003, the deadline was extended 14 times, at which point, Florida dropped out of the negotiations because Georgia refused to compromise. In 2003, the Army Corps of Engineers gave Georgia the rights to a quarter of the water in Lake Lanier for drinking water, and Alabama and Florida objected. After a series of lawsuits between 2003 and 2008 and record drought in 2007, Georgia's rights to the water in Lake Lanier were denied, stating that the change required congressional approval. After several attempts at appeal, it seems Georgia has lost the fight for water rights, but a negotiation has yet to be made. The three states have until 2012 to make a final compromise.

== See also ==
- Agriculture in Florida
