= Riverview, Florida =

- Census-designated place
- Location in Hillsborough County and the state of Florida
- Coordinates: 27°51′56″N 82°17′25″W
- Country: United States
- State: Florida
- Counties: Hillsborough

Area
  - Total: 47.97 sq mi (124.24 km^{2})
  - Land: 46.18 sq mi (119.61 km^{2})
  - Water: 1.79 sq mi (4.63 km^{2})
- Elevation: 72 ft (22 m)

Population (2020)
  - Total: 107,396
  - Density: 2,325.6/sq mi (897.91/km^{2})
- Time zone: UTC-5 (Eastern)
  - Summer (DST): UTC-4 (Eastern)
- ZIP Codes: 33568, 33569, 33578, 33579
- Area code: 813
- FIPS code: 12-60950
- GNIS feature ID: 2403482

Riverview is an unincorporated census-designated place in Hillsborough County, Florida, United States. It is located south of Brandon. The population was 107,396 in the 2020 census, up from 71,050 in the 2010 census.

Many of Tampa Bay's radio and television stations broadcast from an antenna farm in the Riverview area, on Boyette Road, east of town. Riverview is home to Bell Creek Nature Preserve.

== History ==
Riverview was founded in 1885 on the Alafia River's north shore. However, in the 1830s settlers arrived on the south side of the river at an area formerly known as Peru (pronounced "Pe-Roo") because Peru was an indigenous name for "straight part of the river". Peru existed for nearly 100 years and was one of the oldest settlements in central Florida. It wasn't until the 1940s that Riverview absorbed Peru, and now claims the south side of the Alafia River. The Peruvian Mining Company, which mined phosphate from the Alafia, took its name from the settlement. The term "Alafia" is translated as "River of Fire" due to the phosphorus on the early riverbottom glowing at night.

The area's first school was built in 1893, inside the Peru Baptist Church. The area called Riverview began to be populated on the north side of the river. The two communities were connected by a river ferry. Soon after, a bridge was constructed from sections of a bridge that once spanned the Hillsborough River in downtown Tampa. The post office periodically was moved from the Riverview side to the Peru side of the river and back, causing much tension. The Riverview name eventually came into usage in the early 1940s by the post office to relieve just such confusion with the mail. Peru has disappeared from all but the earliest maps. Some of Peru's or Riverview's settlers include the Barnes, Bourgees, Boyettes, Brandons, Buzbees, Hackneys, Hancocks, Hartleys, Mansfields, Moodys, Simmons, Scotts, Symmes, Topes, Thompsons, Whitts, and the Yeomans. The area founded by the Boyette family is now the community of Boyette, located in the eastern part of the Riverview CDP.

The first commercial poultry farm in Florida was established by Emmet and Myrtle Tope in Riverview in 1921.

In 2004, an estimated 65 million US gallons (250×10^{6} L) of acidic process water was released from the Mosaic Fertilizer storage containment system into Archie Creek Canal, Hillsborough Bay, and surrounding wetlands, during Hurricane Frances. The spill harmed seagrass beds and wetland habitats, and killed thousands of fish, crabs, and bottom-dwelling organisms. The NOAA developed restoration options, and in 2013 and 2014, Mosaic implemented a restoration plan.

== Geography ==
Riverview is located southeast of the center of Hillsborough County. The Alafia River flows through the northern part of the CDP and forms part of its northeastern border, separating Riverview from Bloomingdale to the northeast. Other neighboring communities, all unincorporated, are Brandon to the north, Palm River-Clair Mel to the northwest, Progress Village and Gibsonton to the west, Apollo Beach to the southwest, Balm to the south, and FishHawk to the east.

Interstate 75 forms the western edge of the Riverview CDP, with access from Exits 246, 250, 254, and 256. U.S. Route 301 runs through the western side of the CDP, parallel to I-75 and through the original settlement of Riverview at the Alafia River. Downtown Tampa is 12 miles (19 km) to the northwest via US-301 and the Selmon Expressway.

According to the United States Census Bureau, the Riverview CDP has a total area of 48.0 square miles (124.3 km^{2}), of which 46.2 square miles (119.6 km^{2}) are land and 1.8 square miles (4.6 km^{2}), or 3.72%, are water.

== Demographics ==
Historical population
| Census | Pop. | Note | %± |
|---|---|---|---|
| 1970 | 2,225 | | — |
| 1990 | 6,478 | | — |
| 2000 | 12,035 | | 85.8% |
| 2010 | 71,050 | | 490.4% |
| 2020 | 107,396 | | 51.2% |

=== Racial and ethnic composition ===
Riverview racial composition (Hispanics excluded from racial categories) (NH = Non-Hispanic)
| Race | Pop 2010 | Pop 2020 | % 2010 | % 2020 |
|---|---|---|---|---|
| White (NH) | 40,332 | 46,537 | 56.77% | 43.33% |
| Black or African American (NH) | 11,216 | 21,146 | 15.79% | 19.69% |
| Native American or Alaska Native (NH) | 200 | 282 | 0.28% | 0.26% |
| Asian (NH) | 2,163 | 4,110 | 3.04% | 3.83% |
| Pacific Islander or Native Hawaiian (NH) | 62 | 103 | 0.09% | 0.10% |
| Some other race (NH) | 289 | 849 | 0.41% | 0.79% |
| Two or more races/Multiracial (NH) | 1,842 | 5,212 | 2.59% | 4.85% |
| Hispanic or Latino (any race) | 14,946 | 29,157 | 21.04% | 27.15% |
| Total | 71,050 | 107,396 | | |

=== 2020 census ===
As of the 2020 census, Riverview had a population of 107,396. The median age was 36.0 years. 26.7% of residents were under the age of 18 and 10.9% of residents were 65 years of age or older. For every 100 females there were 92.4 males, and for every 100 females age 18 and over there were 88.5 males age 18 and over.

99.0% of residents lived in urban areas, while 1.0% lived in rural areas.

There were 36,584 households in Riverview, of which 41.6% had children under the age of 18 living in them. Of all households, 55.4% were married-couple households, 13.1% were households with a male householder and no spouse or partner present, and 24.0% were households with a female householder and no spouse or partner present. There were 24,057 families in the CDP, and about 16.8% of all households were made up of individuals, with 5.7% having someone living alone who was 65 years of age or older.

There were 38,926 housing units, of which 6.0% were vacant. The homeowner vacancy rate was 2.2% and the rental vacancy rate was 6.5%.

Racial composition as of the 2020 census
| Race | Number | Percent |
|---|---|---|
| White | 53,154 | 49.5% |
| Black or African American | 22,369 | 20.8% |
| American Indian and Alaska Native | 505 | 0.5% |
| Asian | 4,230 | 3.9% |
| Native Hawaiian and Other Pacific Islander | 117 | 0.1% |
| Some other race | 9,216 | 8.6% |
| Two or more races | 17,805 | 16.6% |
| Hispanic or Latino (of any race) | 29,157 | 27.1% |

=== 2010 census ===
As of the 2010 United States census, there were 71,050 people, 22,951 households, and 16,885 families residing in the CDP.

Out of the 24,488 occupied households in the CDP as of 2010, 45.2% had children under the age of 18 living with them, 57.0% were headed by married couples living together, 14.3% had a female householder with no husband present, and 23.5% were non-families. 17.4% of all households were made up of individuals, and 4.4% were someone living alone who was 65 years of age or older. The average household size was 2.89 and the average family size was 3.27.

Within the CDP in 2010, 29.1% of the population were under the age of 18, 7.6% were from 18 to 24, 31.9% were from 25 to 44, 23.8% were from 45 to 64, and 7.7% were 65 years of age or older. The median age was 34.1 years. For every 100 females, there were 92.6 males. For every 100 females age 18 and over, there were 88.7 males.

=== 2011–2015 ACS estimates ===
For the period 2011–15, the estimated median annual income for a household in the community was $66,497, and the median income for a family was $71,517. Male full-time workers had a median income of $47,554 versus $38,000 for females. The per capita income for the community was $26,126. 9.5% of the population and 7.2% of families were below the poverty line. 11.7% of people under 18 and 7.9% of people 65 or older were living in poverty.

=== Languages ===
According to the American Community Survey (ACS), the following estimates were given for the period 2011–15, English spoken at home accounted for 76.64% of all residents, while 23.36% spoke some other language at home. Spanish speakers (of whom 75.5% spoke English "very well") made up 16.98% of the population. No other language accounted for more than 1% of the population.

== Education ==
Riverview is served by the Hillsborough County Public School District with 15 K-12 public schools.

Elementary

- Frost
- Ippolito
- Symmes
- Riverview
- Boyette Springs
- Sessums
- Collins
- Summerfield
- Summerfield Crossings
- Dawson

Middle

- Giunta
- Rodgers

High

- Riverview High School
- Spoto High School
- Sumner High School

Grade school students in Riverview are also served by schools in nearby Lithia and Gibsonton. There are also many charter and private school options in Riverview.

Riverview has two colleges: Cooley Law School near Falkenburg Rd and HCC at The Regent, a satellite campus of Hillsborough Community College in Winthrop Village.

== Infrastructure ==
=== Healthcare ===
AdventHealth Riverview and St. Joseph's Hospital-South are the only hospitals in the area.

== Notable people ==
- Jahleel Addae, NFL safety
- Debra Lafave, a middle school teacher convicted of having sex with a student
- Dioner Navarro, an MLB catcher
- Tom Daugherty, a professional bowler on the PBA Tour
- Ronnie O'Neal, murderer
