= Nonresidential water use in the U.S. =

Nonresidential water use is a volumetric measure of the use of publicly-supplied (municipal) water for areas other than residential use. It is typically subcategorized under users including Commercial, Industrial, and Institutional sub-sectors, which are often jointly designated as the ICI or CII sector.

Public water supply deliveries in the United States, shown as million gallons per day and percent share

== Estimates of total CII use ==
In the United States, a USGS nationwide compilation of public supply withdrawals and deliveries indicates that in 2010 the total daily volume of nonresidential use was approximately 12,000 million gallons per day (mgd) and accounted for about 29 percent of public supply withdrawals (or 45 gallons per capita per day when divided by the estimated 268 million people who relied on public-supply water). This estimate is obtained by subtracting from total public supply freshwater withdrawals (41,700 mgd) the reported domestic (residential) use (23,800 mgd) and allowing for 14 percent of unaccounted for water (because of leaks, hydrant flushing, tower maintenance, and other system losses, also called non-revenue water). The estimates of average water loss in public supply systems in the U.S. range from 12 to 16 percent. The share of CII use varies across water utilities; in a sample of 31 utilities in Texas it ranged from less than 4 percent of metered use in Lamar County WSD to 79 percent in Borger MWS, with average share of 35 percent. In order to achieve improvements in the efficiency of CII water use, it is necessary to obtain information about the existing conservation potential in different types of establishments and about specific end uses of water in each CII category. Studies of water use in the CII sector were conducted by the American Water Works Association, Pacific Institute, Colorado WaterWise Council, Conserve Florida Water Clearinghouse (CFWC), and The Water Research Foundation (WRF).

== CII user categories and subcategories ==
Nearly a hundred specific end uses within seven major groupings (i.e., washing and sanitation, domestic-type uses, landscape irrigation, outdoor and indoor water features, cooling and heating, food service, and process water) were compiled in the WRF study. Typically, the total CII use in an urban area or a region is broken down by categories of commercial establishments (and types of institutions or industrial plants) based on the kinds of goods and services provided, or their function. The category's water use is then separated into several end uses (or purposes). The following list of 14 major CII categories of nonresidential buildings or establishments (with examples of possible subcategories) are commonly found in an urban water service area of a public water supplier (or water utility):

- Establishments/sites with a dominant water end use: commercial/industrial laundries, laundromats, car washes, city parks and recreation areas, public pools and water parks, golf courses, irrigated landscape areas.
- Office buildings: large offices w/cooling towers, office complexes w/irrigation, small office buildings.
- Lodging places: hotels, motels and inns, resort hotels (with and without irrigation and cooling).
- Eating places: full-service restaurants, fast food outlets, bakeries and cafeterias, bars and clubs.
- Food sales: grocery stores and supermarkets, convenience stores.
- Retail outlets: retail stores, strip shopping centers and enclosed malls, liquor stores.
- Schools: pre-schools and day care, primary and secondary schools, university/college campuses.
- Health care: hospitals and sanitariums, medical centers, doctor offices, laboratories.
- Service: auto service (auto sales, gas stations, auto repair shops), personal services.
- Public assembly buildings: community centers, meeting halls, convention centers, health clubs, bowling alleys, ice rinks, museums, theaters, cinemas, sports arenas, libraries, funeral homes, exhibition halls.
- Public order and safety facilities: police stations, fire stations, prison, reformatory, or penitentiary, courthouse or probation office
- Religious buildings: churches, synagogues, monasteries, mosques, sanctuaries.
- Elderly care facilities: retirement homes, residential care/assisted living, hospices.
- Manufacturing: heavy industry, light industry, food and beverage processing, machine shops.

These CII categories and subcategories account for a high percentage of the total CII use. Some of these building/establishment types are identified at some levels of aggregation of the North American Industry Classification System (NAICS) and former Standard Industrial Classification (SIC) codes. Also, the Energy Information Administration (EIA) identified 85 types of commercial buildings and facilities which were grouped into 16 general categories. Many of these overlap with the list of 14 groupings listed above.

== Water use metrics and benchmarks ==
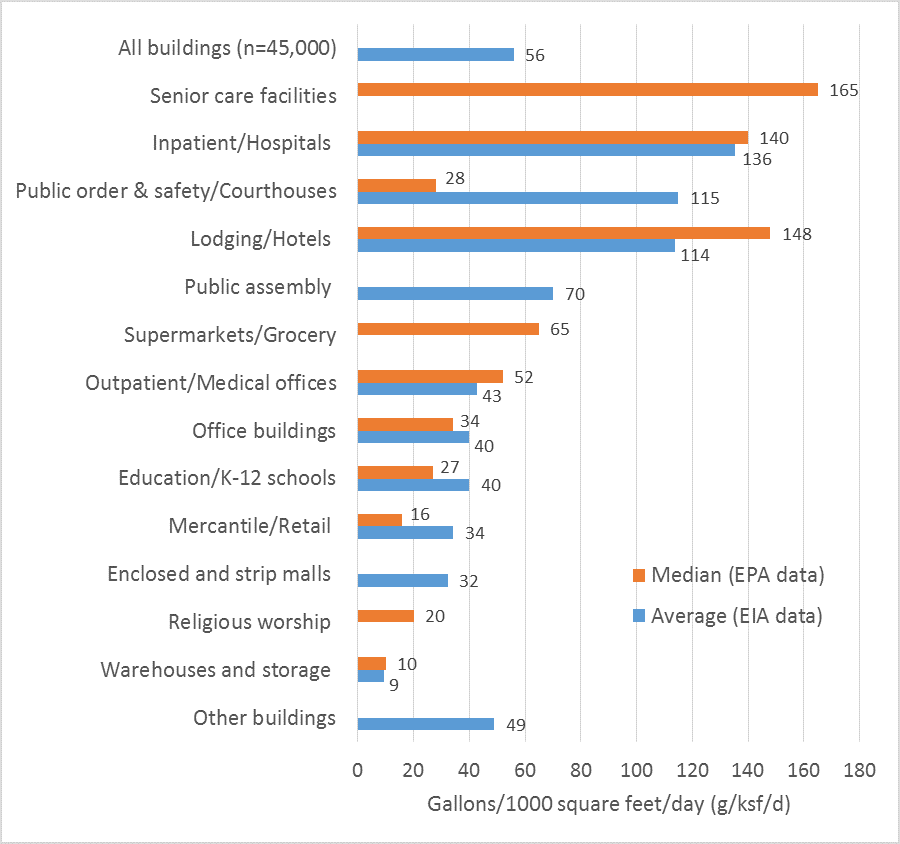
Water use intensity (WUI) metrics in gallons/1000 square feet/day: Average values from EIA data on large commercial buildings and Median values from EPA Portfolio Manager data

Water conservation planners (at water utilities) and CII customers use several metrics of water use (and their associated benchmarks) in order to assess their success in achieving water use efficiency goals. A “metric” (or “performance indicator”) is a unit of measure (based on a formula) that can be used to calculate the rate of water use during a given period of time (and at a given level of data aggregation). A “benchmark” is a particular (numerical) value of a metric that denotes a specific level of performance, such as a water-use efficiency target. When quantifying water use in the CII sector, the total volume of consumption (over any given time interval) at any given CII facility is “normalized” by the scale of water-using activity, which corresponds to the rate at which water is used (also referred to as water use intensity or WUI). Two scaling factors (or "proxy" measures of scale), the number of employees and the square footage of buildings (or facilities) are commonly used in the CII sector because the employment and floor space data are generally available. Examples of the corresponding proxy metrics are: water use per employee in manufacturing plants, or water use per square foot in office buildings. However, more appropriate are "functional" metrics such as water use per occupied room in hotels, or water use per meal served in restaurants, since they are linked more directly to water use. National surveys of commercial buildings by the U.S. DOE Energy Information Administration and EPA Energy Star provided proxy metrics data on the mean and median values of water use per square foot of buildings floor space. The median values are useful when placing water use in a CII establishment among its peers because the sample distributions typically have a pronounced right tail skew. Mean (or average) values are useful to planners who need to estimate total category use based on results from a sample of establishments.

Water utilities often adopt water efficiency programs that are directed specifically to CII customers. The programs often target the largest water users as well as specific categories of CII customers including government and municipal buildings, large landscape areas, schools and colleges, office buildings, restaurants and hotels. Water use information in these and other readily recognizable functional classes of CII users from several studies of the CII sector are briefly characterized below.

== Water use in major CII categories ==
=== Office buildings ===
In the U.S. cities, the share of the total CII use of water in office buildings ranges from 12 percent (in Tampa, Florida) to 30 percent (in New York City). The three largest uses of water in office buildings include restrooms, heating and cooling, and landscape watering. The reported proxy metrics of water use intensity (WUI) for office buildings range from 25 gallons/1000 square feet/day (g/ksf/d) to 129 g/ksf/d with reported weighted average use from eight utilities from Florida and Texas of 88 g/ksf/d. The reported median values range from 34 g/ksf/d to 62 g/ksf/d. Estimates of average daily use per employee range from 9 gallons/employee/day (ged) to 18 ged with the median value of 13 ged in the EPA’s Energy Star Portfolio Manager data. Nationwide, there are approximately 1,012 thousand office buildings with a combined floor space of 1,952 million square feet. Assuming the WUI of 88 g/ksf/d as representing average office usage in the U.S., the total country-wide use would be 1,400 mgd or close to 12 percent of CII use. Significant quantities of water can be saved in older office buildings by replacing bathroom fixtures, cooling tower efficiency retrofits, and adopting efficient landscape irrigation measures. Estimates of potential water conservation savings range from 19 percent in southwest Florida to 30 percent or more in California.

=== Retail outlets ===
Retail (also classified under mercantile or commerce) includes retail stores, vehicle dealerships, strip shopping centers, and enclosed malls. Retail outlets account for significant percentage of CII use; examples include 4 percent in Oakland CA (East Bay MUD), 5 percent in Austin TX, about 15 percent in Tampa FL, 17 percent in Phoenix AZ, and 20 percent in New York City. The major end uses in retail stores are space cooling, restrooms and landscape irrigation. The reported proxy metrics on water use intensity in retail outlets include an estimate of 122 gallons/1000 square feet/day (g/ksf/d) in Phoenix AZ, 40 g/ksf/d in Santa Fe NM, and 98 g/ksf/d for one-story stores and 115 g/ksf/d for community shopping centers based on data from eight utilities in Florida and Texas. According to the EIA survey there are 438 thousand retail stores (other than malls) and 164 thousand enclosed and strip malls in the U.S. Their estimated total floor space is, respectively, 5,439 and 5,890 million square feet. Assuming the WUI of 98 g/ksf/d for retail stores and 115 g/ksf/d for shopping centers, the combined use of retail outlets in the U.S. would be 1,210 mgd or 10 percent of total CII use.

=== Restaurants ===
Restaurants (and fast food places) account for about 3 percent of total CII use in Austin, Texas and 5 percent in Oakland, California (EBMUD) and up to 8 percent in the State of Florida. The largest uses of water in restaurants result from kitchen activities such as washing dishes, making ice, and preparing food. A significant amount of water is also used for restrooms. The proxy metrics data show WUIs in restaurants ranging from 474 to 578 g/ksf/d in selected Colorado utilities, an average of 589 g/ksf/d in Austin, Texas, and 670 g/ksf/d in Florida. Somewhat wider range of 356 to 907 g/ksf/d was reported in an earlier study. Data on functional metrics suggests that restaurants would use around 6 to 9 gallons of water per meal served, 20 to 31 gallons per seat per day, and 86 to 122 gallons per employee per day. Other studies reported 17 gallons/seat/day in Santa Fe, New Mexico and 29 gallons/seat per day in Colorado utilities.

Given the total floor space of 380 thousand food service buildings of 1,819 million square feet and assuming average use of 521 g/ksf/d, the total U.S.-wide use in restaurants would be 950 mgd or close to 8 percent of CII use. Restaurants can save significant amounts of water by maximizing the efficiency of pre-rinse spray valves, food disposal systems and upgrading dishwashers, ice machines, and steam cookers to Energy Star® qualified models that use less water.

=== Schools ===
The shares of total CII use in schools range from 3.5 percent in Phoenix, Arizona to 6.5 percent in Tampa, Florida and up to 8 percent in Oakland, California. Most schools use water for restrooms, cooling and heating, irrigation of outdoor playing fields and lawns, locker rooms, laboratories, and cafeteria kitchens. An expected intensity of use (WUI) in schools would be between 22 and 44 g/ksf/d for indoor use and from 110 to 255 g/ksf/d of total use. More recent studies show observed school use of 33 to 52 g/ksf/d in Colorado and 76 g/ksf/d in eight utilities from Florida and Texas. The EPA Energy Star’s Portfolio Manager shows median use of 27 g/ksf/d. Data on functional metrics show schools' use between 3 and 15 gallons per school day per student for indoor use. and between 4.7 and 23.6 gallons/student/day in Santa Fe, New Mexico. There are 389,000 school buildings in the U.S. with the total floor space of 12,239 million square feet. This building count includes preschools and day care, elementary and middle schools, high schools, and colleges and universities. Given the total floor space of these educational facilities and assuming average use (WUI) of 68 g/ksf/d, as representing average use in the U.S., the total use in schools would be about 830 mgd or close to 7 percent of the total CII use. Because most water is used in restrooms and locker rooms, installing WaterSense labeled showerheads, toilets, bathroom faucets, and flushing urinals and also periodically checking automatic sensors on these fixtures would help ensure they are operating properly and thus eliminate unnecessary water use.

=== Hotels and motels ===
The share of total CII water use by hotels and motels in the U.S. cities ranges from 3 percent in Oakland, California and 4 percent in Austin, Texas to 13 percent in the State of Florida. Average daily use in hotels depends on the type and size of the hotel and the presence of the major end uses of water including cooling towers, on-site laundry, dining and kitchen, swimming pool, and landscape irrigation. For example, in a sample of 706 hotels in New York City, average daily water use intensity in 2011 ranged from 60 to 456 gallons per 1000 square feet (g/ksf/d), with the median use of 215 g/ksf/d. In other areas the median use per 1000 square feet were reported at: 257 gallons in Florida, and 219 gallons in Austin, Texas. The EPA Energy Star’s Portfolio Manager that tracks water use at CII facilities found median use in hotels of 102 gallons/room/day. Given the existing inventory of about 5 million hotel rooms in the country with the combined floor space of 3,319 million square feet, and assuming average use of 209 g/ksf/d, the estimated total water use would be 694 mgd or about 6 percent of the CII use. A popular way of saving water in hotels is by encouraging guests to reuse towels and bed linens in order to cut down on the amount of water used in hotel laundry and also by upgrading guest rooms with EPA WaterSense labeled faucets, shower heads, and toilets.

=== Hospitals ===
Water use by hospitals and other health care facilities accounts for about 3 percent of CII use in Phoenix, Arizona, and about 11 percent in New York City. The EPA Energy Star’s Portfolio Manager, (designed to track water use of CII facilities) found hospitals to be the third most intense use category, at around 150 gallons per 1000 square feet per day (g/ksf/d), following senior care facilities and hotels, with some facilities reporting WUIs of greater than 410 g/ksf/d. Other studies reported average use of 159 g/ksf/d in Austin, Texas, and a median of 140 g/ksf/d in EPA's Portfolio Managers data set. Data from medical offices show usage rates of 156 g/ksf/d in Florida. and 64 g/ksf/d in Santa Fe, New Mexico. With respect to functional metrics, the Portfolio Manager data show the median hospital use of 315 gallons of water per hospital bed per day. Given the total floor space of 2,374 million square feet in 10 thousand inpatient care (hospital) buildings and assuming the average WUI of 186 g/ksf/d, the total use in hospitals would be 442 mgd or close to 3.7 percent of CII use. In addition, there are 147 thousand buildings with outpatient care clinics and medical offices with the total floor space of 1,780 million square feet. Assuming average use of 132 g/ksf/d, the total use in outpatient care would be 235 mgd or close to 2.0 percent of CII use. Hospitals can save water by employing water-efficient practices through operational improvements and upgraded equipment, especially cooling towers and other cooling and heating equipment.

=== Elderly care facilities ===
Nursing homes and assisted living communities account for 3.2 percent of CII use in the State of Florida and 5.4 percent in the urban area served by Tampa Bay Water. The reported estimates of WUI are 232 g/ksf/d in eight utilities from Florida and Texas and a range from 170 to 277 g/ksf/d in Colorado. There are approximately 15,600 nursing homes (with 1,663,300 beds) and 30,200 residential care communities (with 1,000,000 beds) in the U.S. Based on the total floor space of 1,275 million square feet and an assumed average use of 232 g/ksf/d, the total water use by elderly care buildings in the U.S. would be 296 mgd or 2.5 percent of CII use.

=== Car washes ===
There are 113 thousand commercial car washes in the U.S. and about 8 million cars are washed each day. Average use of fresh water to wash a car is about 38 gallons per vehicle (gpv) in automatic bay and conveyor types and about 15 gallons in self-service bays. Significantly less fresh water is needed in washes with reclaim water systems. Total estimated use of water in commercial car washes is about 2 percent of CII use.

=== Supermarkets/food sales ===
Water used in food stores and supermarkets represents about 1 percent or less of total CII use. Supermarkets use considerable quantities of water to cool the condensers units for the refrigeration systems, such as display coolers and freezers, storage coolers and freezers, butcher shops, delis, and bakeries. In addition, water is used in the cleaning and preparation of the fresh produce, meats, and fish before the products are put onto the shelves. Data on the intensity of water use include the estimate of 113 g/ksf/d in Santa Fe and a range from 161 to 295 g/ksf/d in other Southwestern U.S. locations. EPA's Portfolio Manager reported median use of 66 g/ksf/d. Other metrics include estimated 2.6 to 4.5 gallons per transaction. In the U.S., there are 177 thousand buildings involved in food sales. These include convenience stores, grocery stores and supermarkets with the total floor space of 1,252 million square feet. Given the total floor space and assuming average use intensity (WUI) of 65 g/ksf/d, as representing average use in the U.S., the total use in food sales would be 81 mgd or 0.7 percent of CII use.

=== Manufacturing ===
Use of public supply water by manufacturing category varies greatly across U.S. cities depending on the presence (or absence) of water-intensive manufacturing plants and the availability of local sources of water supply. The available data indicate shares of 9 percent in Tampa, Florida and New York City; 15 percent in Austin, Texas, 21 percent in Oakland, California (East Bay MUD) and 13 percent in North Carolina. As of 2010 in the U.S. there are 170,169 manufacturing establishments with a combined floor space of 11,100 million square feet. Most large manufacturing plants have their own source of water supply and purchase some amounts of drinking quality water from public systems. In 2010, the self-supplied industrial use (excluding thermoelectric plants and mining) was 15,900 mgd. The amount purchased from public systems was reported to be 4,750 mgd in 1995 (or about 40 percent of total CII use). Based on the total floor space of 11,100 million square feet in manufacturing buildings in the U.S. and assuming average use of 215 g/ksf/d, the total use of publicly-supplied water by the CII manufacturing category in the U.S. would be about 2,400 mgd or about 20 percent of the total CII use.
