= Bloomingdale, Florida =

- Census-designated place
- Location in Hillsborough County and the state of Florida
- Coordinates: 27°52′38″N 82°15′12″W
- Country: United States
- State: Florida
- County: Hillsborough

Area
  - Total: 8.38 sq mi (21.71 km^{2})
  - Land: 8.14 sq mi (21.07 km^{2})
  - Water: 0.25 sq mi (0.64 km^{2})
- Elevation: 62 ft (19 m)

Population (2020)
  - Total: 22,947
  - Density: 2,821.1/sq mi (1,089.23/km^{2})
- Time zone: UTC−5 (Eastern (EST))
  - Summer (DST): UTC−4 (EDT)
- ZIP Codes: 33511, 33596
- Area code: 813, 656
- FIPS code: 12-06875
- GNIS feature ID: 2402694

Bloomingdale is an unincorporated census-designated place in Hillsborough County, Florida, United States. The population was 22,947 at the 2020 census, up from 22,711 at the 2010 census. The ZIP Codes serving the community are 33511 (which is addressed to Brandon) and 33596 (which is addressed to Valrico).

== History ==
Bloomingdale was settled some time before 1850 by John Vickers, John Carney, and others. Carney was killed on April 17, 1856, by Seminoles during the Third Seminole War. Bloomingdale School was founded in 1884, which in 1897 became a teacher's institute, training an average of 54 teachers at a time from as far north as Gainesville and as far south as Miami-Dade County. In 1890 the railway was routed through Brandon, and Bloomingdale began to decline as businessmen like D.J. Galvin, who owned a feed store on the property that is now Mulrennan Middle School, moved to Brandon for access to all the benefits provided by the railroad. In 1910, the post office closed. In 1920, the school closed and the students were sent to Brandon instead. The community declined, or at best remained stable until the 1960s, when it became a bedroom community for Tampa.

== Geography ==
Bloomingdale is located in east-central Hillsborough County. It is bordered to the north by Brandon, to the northeast by Valrico, to the southeast by FishHawk, and to the southwest by Riverview. Bloomingdale is 16 miles (26 km) southeast of downtown Tampa.

According to the United States Census Bureau, the Bloomingdale CDP has a total area of 8.4 square miles (21.7 km^{2}), of which 8.1 square miles (21.1 km^{2}) are land and 0.2 square miles (0.6 km^{2}), or 2.97%, are water. The Alafia River forms the southern border of the CDP. Bell Shoals are some rapids on the river in Bloomingdale.

== Demographics ==
Historical population
Census	Pop.	Note	%±
1990	13,912		—
2000	19,839		42.6%
2010	22,711		14.5%
2020	22,947		1.0%

=== 2020 census ===
As of the 2020 census, Bloomingdale had a population of 22,947. The median age was 41.8 years. 23.3% of residents were under the age of 18 and 16.6% were 65 years of age or older. For every 100 females there were 96.7 males, and for every 100 females age 18 and over there were 94.8 males age 18 and over.

100.0% of residents lived in urban areas, while 0.0% lived in rural areas.

There were 8,069 households in Bloomingdale, of which 35.9% had children under the age of 18 living in them. Of all households, 62.5% were married-couple households, 11.9% were households with a male householder and no spouse or partner present, and 19.6% were households with a female householder and no spouse or partner present. About 15.4% of all households were made up of individuals and 6.9% had someone living alone who was 65 years of age or older.

There were 8,366 housing units, of which 3.6% were vacant. The homeowner vacancy rate was 1.3% and the rental vacancy rate was 6.6%.

Racial composition as of the 2020 census
Race	Number	Percent
White	15,912	69.3%
Black or African American	1,984	8.6%
American Indian and Alaska Native	102	0.4%
Asian	754	3.3%
Native Hawaiian and Other Pacific Islander	19	0.1%
Some other race	1,010	4.4%
Two or more races	3,166	13.8%
Hispanic or Latino (of any race)	4,027	17.5%

=== 2006–2008 American Community Survey ===
The median income for a household in the community was $68,911, and the median income for a family was $72,282 (these figures had risen to $87,366 and $94,723 respectively as of a 2007 estimate). Males had a median income of $50,217 versus $31,727 for females. The per capita income for the community was $26,552. About 1.1% of families and 1.7% of the population were below the poverty line, including 5.0% of those under age 18 and 2.1% of those age 65 or over.

== Education ==
Bloomingdale is served by Hillsborough County Schools. Bloomingdale High School is located within the community.
