= Picnic, Florida =

Picnic
- Unincorporated community
- Location within the state of Florida
- Coordinates: 27°45′45″N 82°08′44″W
- Country: United States
- State: Florida
- County: Hillsborough
- Time zone: UTC-5 (Eastern (EST))
  - Summer (DST): UTC-4 (EDT)

Picnic, also known as Hurrah, is an unincorporated community in southeastern Hillsborough County, Florida, United States, between Plant City and Lithia near the intersection of Carter Road and Florida State Road 39. It is best known as the home of Alafia River State Park.

== History ==
Picnic and Hurrah started as separate communities, shortly after the civil war. It draws its name from a popular gathering place at the junction of the Alafia River and Hurrah Creek.

== Education ==
The community of Picnic is served by Hillsborough County Schools. Students are zoned for Pinecrest Elementary, Turkey Creek Middle School and Durant High School.
