= Sumner High School (Riverview, Florida) =

Jule F. Sumner High School

Location
- 10650 County Road 672; Riverview, Florida 33579; United States; 27°46′09″N 82°19′28″W

Information
- Type: Public high school
- Motto: "Unity Through Diversity"
- Established: 2020
- School district: Hillsborough County Public Schools
- Principal: Robert Nelson
- Staff: 152.50 (FTE)
- Grades: 8, 9–12
- Enrollment: 3,827 (2022–23)
- Student to teacher ratio: 25.10
- Colors: Victory Blue; Kelly Green; Silver
- Mascot: Stingrays
- Website: www.hillsboroughschools.org/o/sumner

Jule F. Sumner High School is a public high school in Riverview, Florida, United States. It opened in 2020 and was built to relieve overcrowding at East Bay High School in Gibsonton and Earl J. Lennard High School in Ruskin, though it also took some students from Joe E. Newsome High School in Lithia and from Durant High School in Plant City. The school is named after Jule F. Sumner, who was an early settler of the Southshore area.

== Grades ==
Sumner High School served grades 6 and 9–11 beginning in the 2020–21 school year. In the 2021–22 school year, the school supported grades 7 and 9–12. In the 2022–23 school year, the school supported grades 8–12. Beginning in the 2023–24 school year, Sumner High School became exclusively a secondary school (grades 9–12). This was part of the school's Academy 2027 program to relieve overcrowding in middle schools in the area before a new one is built.

== Athletics ==
The Stingrays' football field is one of three in Hillsborough County to have an artificial turf field. Sumner High School's fight song is "The New Colonial March" by R. B. Hall.

== Demographics ==
Demographic data includes the Academy 2027 program students. 51.3% of the students at Sumner are male, while 48.7% are female.

Sumner High ethnic enrollment
Race	2020-2021		2021-2022		2022-2023	
Hispanic or Latino	1,024	43.21%	1,426	41.05%	1,557	40.74%
Black (NH)	627	26.46%	1,034	29.76%	1,171	30.64%
White (NH)	530	22.36%	707	20.35%	768	20.09%
Mixed/Multi-Racial (NH)	139	5.86%	240	6.91%	259	6.78%
Asian (NH)	48	2.03%	63	1.81%	61	1.60%
Native American (NH)	2	0.08%	4	0.12%	6	0.16%
Total	2,370	100.00%	3,474	100.00%	3,822	100.00%

Sumner High lunch status
Status	2021-2022	
Free lunch eligible	1,617	46.75%
Neither	1,572	45.45%
Reduced-price lunch eligible	270	7.80%
Total	3,459	100.00%
