= Alafia River State Park =

State park in Florida, United States

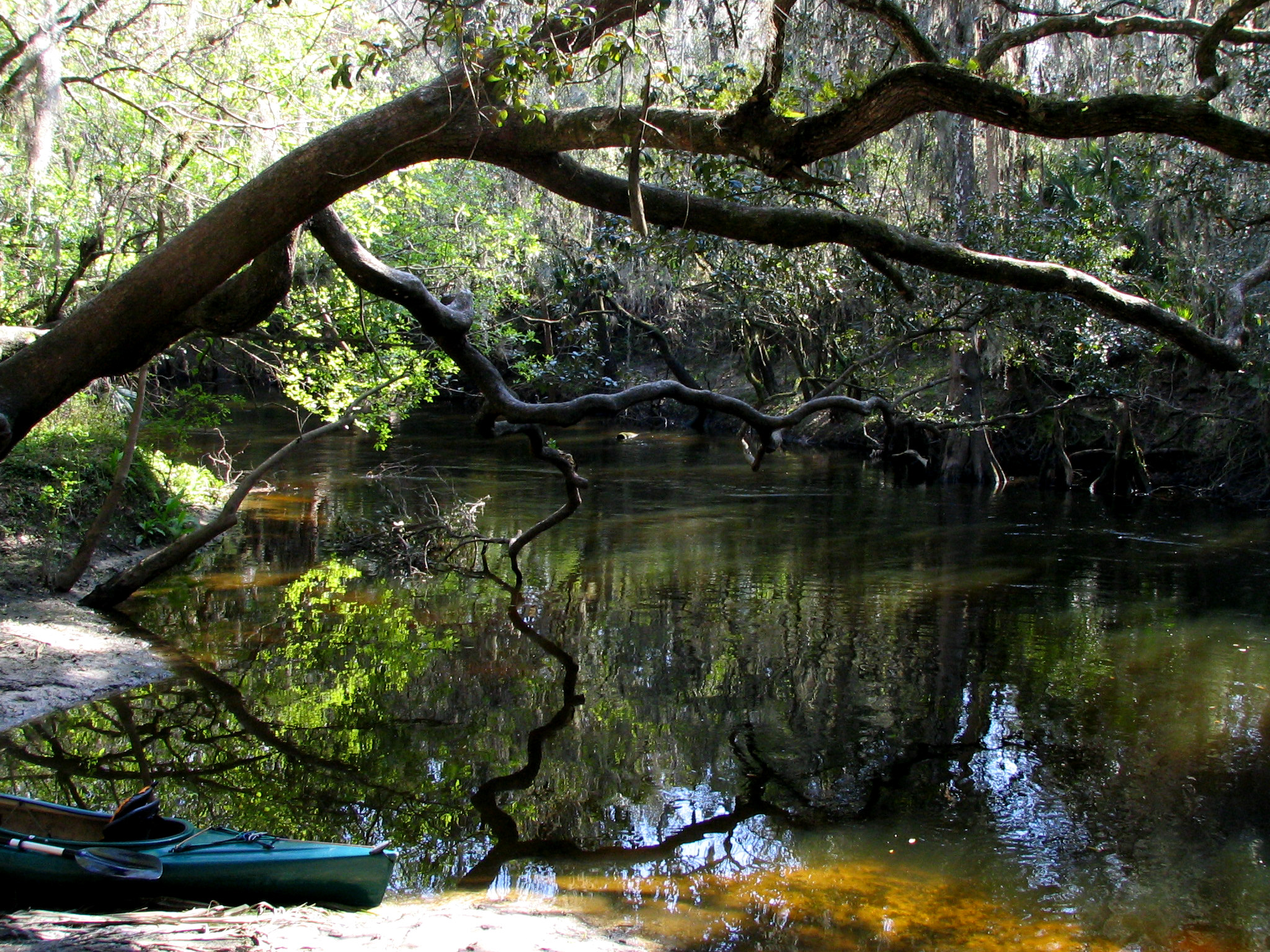
- On the Alafia River near Lithia Springs Park

- Location within Florida Location within the United States
- Interactive map of Alafia River State Park
- Location: Hillsborough County, Florida, United States
- Nearest city: Lithia, Florida
- Coordinates: 27°46′48.41″N 82°8′41.05″W
- Governing body: Florida Department of Environmental Protection

Alafia River State Park is a Florida State Park, located near Picnic in Hillsborough County in central Florida, 17 miles or 27 kilometers southeast of Tampa on County Road 39. Even before it became a park, the area, and particularly Hurrah Lake, was the center of leisure activities since the early 1880s.

== History ==
Phosphate mining began in the area in the 19th century. At its peak the Lonesome Mine was owned by American Cyanamid and then its subsidiary Brewster Phosphates, who excavated the area with draglines until it was no longer commercially profitable to do so. In 1993, Brewster Phosphates including the Lonesome Mine was transferred from American Cyanamid to Cytec Industries. In 1996, Cytec donated the land to the state to be used as a park in perpetuity. Some of the topographical changes caused by mining have been reclaimed, but others, including the features known as the Old Agrico Pits, persist. Some of these were shaped into small lakes during reclamation efforts by Brewster Phosphates under the state's failed Old Lands Program.

== Recreational activities ==
The park has such amenities as bicycling, birding, canoeing, fishing, hiking, horse trails, picnicking areas, wildlife viewing and full camping facilities. Especially known for its mountain biking, it has trails ranging from beginning to advanced, with the advanced ones being in an area of the park that was once a phosphorus strip mine. The mountain bike trails were originally created and maintained by the SouthWest Association of Mountain Bike Pedalers (SWAMP) club, but are now maintained by the Friends of Alafia club.

== Mountain biking ==
Alafia State Park is home to 27 kilometers or 17 miles of bike trails that range from novice to highly advanced sections.

== Gallery ==
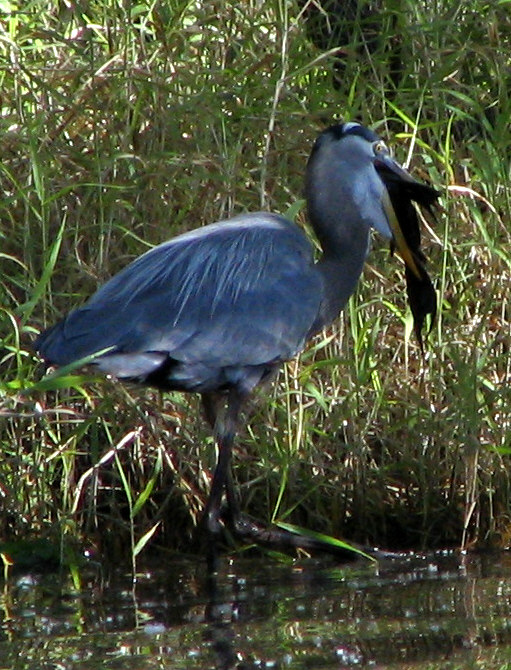
Great blue heron

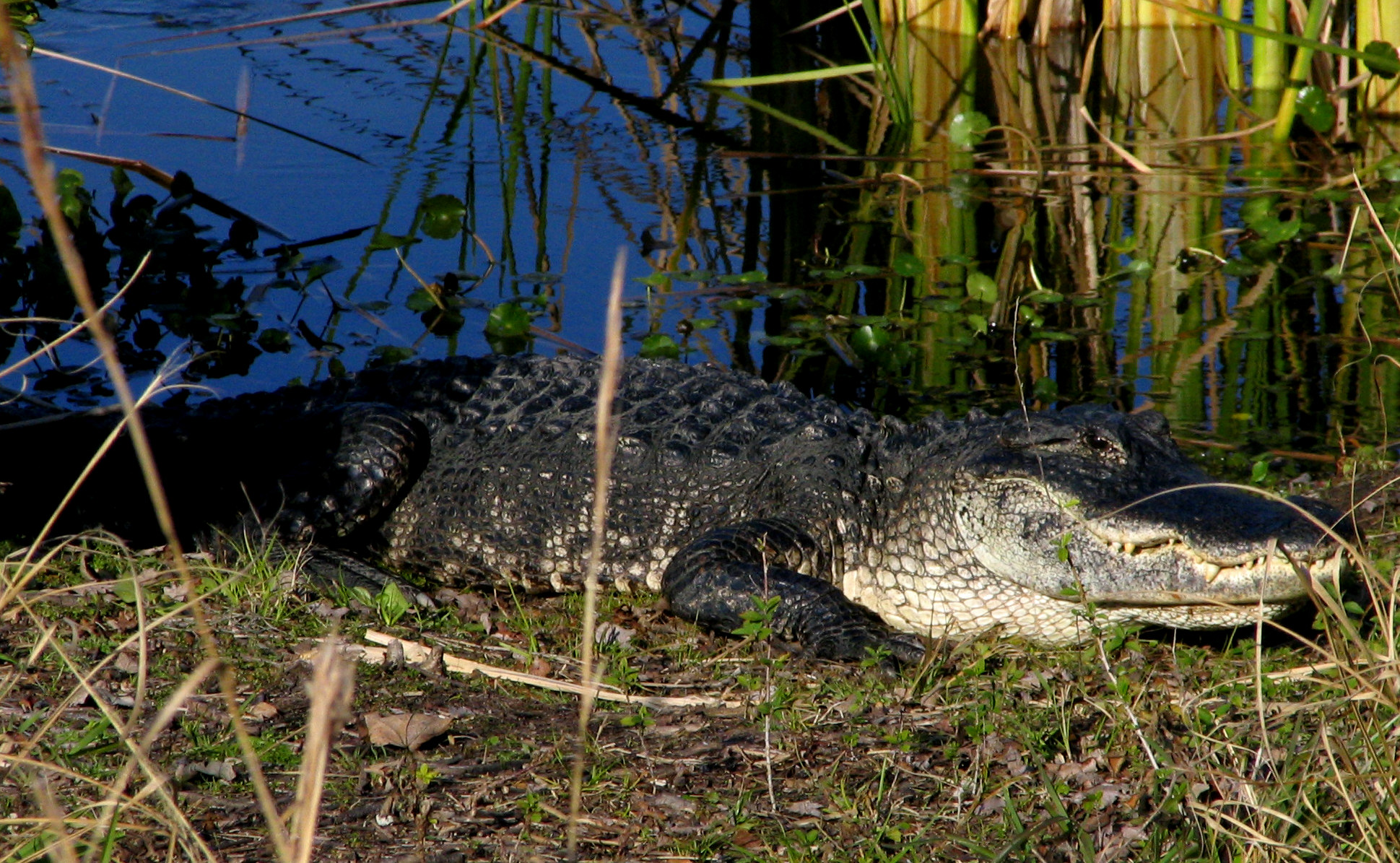
An American alligator near the campground

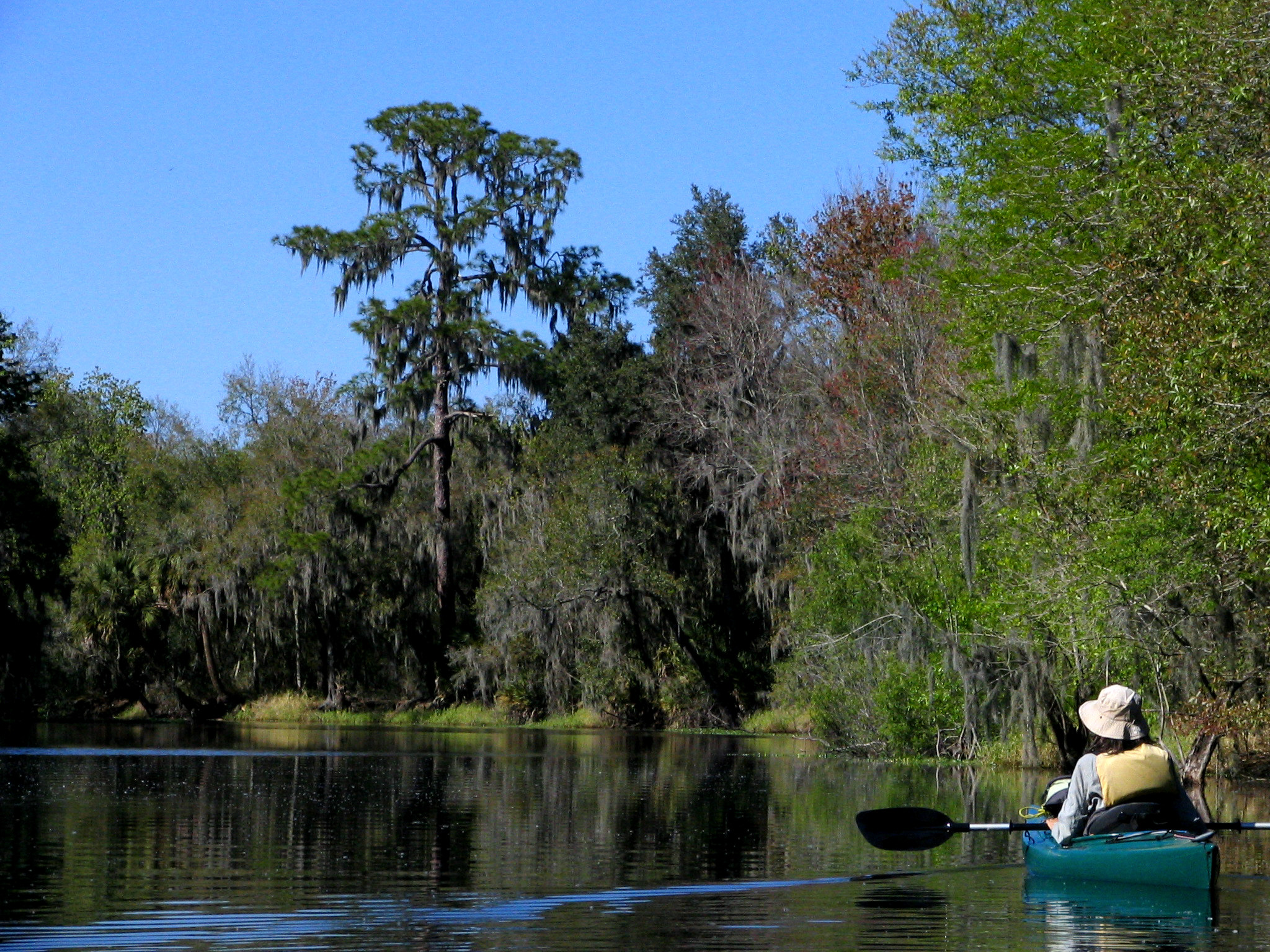
Hurrah Lake on the Alafia River

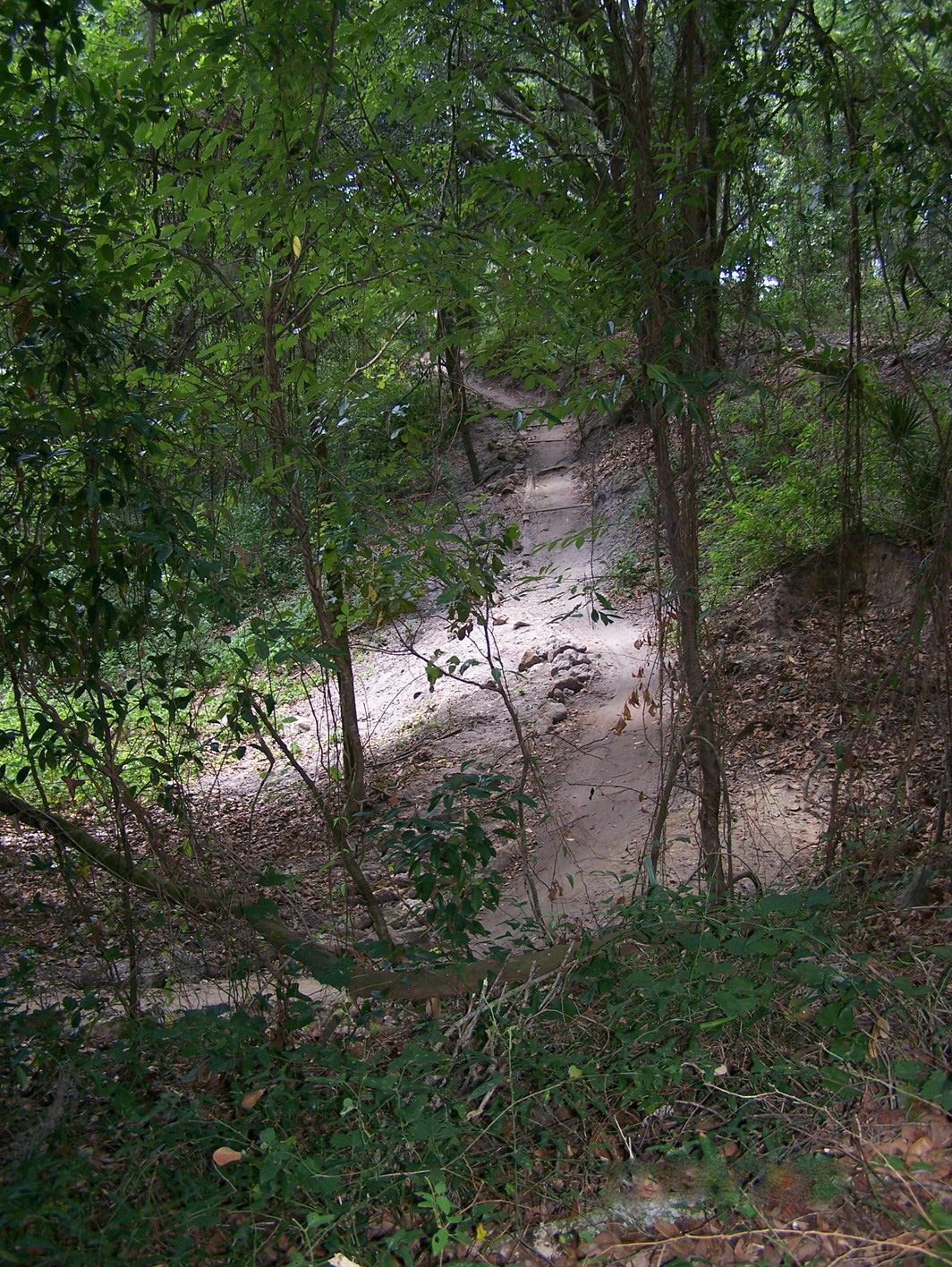
Footpath to the left, tough cycle path to the right
