= Peru, Florida =

Former town in Hillsborough County, Florida

Coordinates: 27°52′00″N 82°19′25″W

Peru, Florida was a town in Hillsborough County, Florida, that was later absorbed into Riverview. It was initially settled in 1843 on the South bank of the Alafia River at what is now US Highway 301 by Benjamin Moody and others who came to claim land under the "Armed Occupation Act of Florida" which was passed in 1842 and granted 160 acres of land to any head of family or any single man who would bear arms and live on the land in a house for five years. The name was pronounced "Pe-Roo", as Peru was a native name meaning "straight part of the river". The town existed for almost 100 years before being absorbed into Riverview in the 1940s.

Prior to the occupation by white settlers, the area was inhabited by a Timucuan group known as the Mocoso.

In the 1800s, the Peruvian Mining Company mined phosphate in the area. A post office was established in 1879, closing in 1900 with the mail being routed through the Riverview post office. In 1900, Hillsborough County contracted Virginia Bridge and Iron of Roanoke, Virginia to build a bridge between Peru and Riverview at a cost of $7,864.00, replacing the ferry. The bridge was constructed with the ironwork of the Lafayette Street bridge in Tampa.
