= Chito Branch Reserve =

Nature preserve, United States of America

- Location within Florida
- Location: Tampa, Florida
- Coordinates: 27.8193°N 82.1675°W
- Area: 5,515 acres (22.32 km^{2})
- Operator: Southwest Florida Water Management District

The Chito Branch Reserve is located in southeastern Hillsborough County, Florida, and is part of the Southwest Florida Water Management District landholdings. It was acquired by the District in 2001, and is 5,515 acres (22.32 km^{2}). It is located at 11254 Browning Road in Lithia, Florida. The preserve protects a water resorvoir and offers birdwatching, hiking, biking, and equestrian opportunities.
