= Grace Christian School (Florida) =

Private school in Florida, United States

Location
- Valrico, (Hillsborough County), Florida; United States; 27°57′46″N 82°15′14″W

Information
- Type: Private School, high school
- Established: 1974
- Principal: Barry McKeen
- Grades: K–12
- Colors: Red, White, and Blue
- Team name: Patriots
- Accreditation: National Christian School Association
- Website: www.gracechristianschool.com

Grace Christian School (GCS) is a private K–12 Christian school located in Valrico, Florida, United States. It was established in 1974 by Robert R. Gustafson.

== College courses ==
GCS has partnered with Southeastern University to offer dual-enrollment classes.

== Athletics ==
The school's athletic teams are referred to as the Patriots. The school fields teams in soccer, volleyball, basketball, baseball and softball.

== Teacher Arrests ==
In 2024, Denzel Proctor, a former teacher at the school, was arrested for having an inappropriate relationship with a student, resulting in the student becoming pregnant.

== LGBTQ Student Policy ==
In August 2022, per the school's published school policy, it was announced via email that the school would recognize students only by the gender and name on their birth certificate, and would ask any LGBTQ+ students to leave the school. The email, sent by the school before the start of the school year, went on to say "Students who are found participating in these lifestyles will be asked to leave the school immediately."

== Demographics ==
In 2022, ProPublica reported the student body was 96.0% White and 1.2% Black, while the local school district was 32.4% White and 20.9% Black.
