= Jose Gomez (American soccer) =

American soccer player and coach

Personal information
- Full name: Jose Raul Gomez
- Date of birth: March 12, 1979 (age 47)
- Place of birth: Valrico, Florida, U.S.
- Height: 5 ft 8 in (1.73 m)
- Position: Midfielder

College career
Years	Team	Apps	(Gls)
1997–2000	Liberty Flames		

Senior career*
Years	Team	Apps	(Gls)
2001–2003	Charlotte Eagles	77	(13)
2004–2005	Virginia Beach Mariners	30	(0)

Managerial career
- 2005–2014: Palm Beach Atlantic Sailfish (men)
- 2014–2019: Liberty Flames (associate men's coach)
- 2020–present: Charleston Southern University (women)
- * Club domestic league appearances and goals

Jose Gomez is an American retired soccer midfielder who played professionally in the USL A-League. He was the Associate Head Coach of the Liberty University men's soccer team. Gomez is currently the DI Head Coach at Charleston Southern University.

== Player ==
Gomez graduated from Lakeland Christian School, where he was a part of four high school state championship teams. His team won two titles and finished runner-up twice. He attended Liberty University, playing on the men's soccer team from 1997 to 2000. He was the 2000 Big South Conference Player of the Year A starter for all 67 games of his collegiate career, Gomez finished his days in a Liberty uniform with 77 points, 32 goals and 13 assists. At the time of his induction into the Liberty Athletics Hall of Fame, Gomez's 32 career goals ranked fifth-best in program history. Gomez graduated with a bachelor's degree in business management and later went back to complete his master's degree in Business Administration. He is currently a PhD candidate earning a Doctorate in Business Administration from Liberty University. In February 2001, the Charlotte Eagles selected Gomez in the first round (twenty-third overall) of the USL A-League draft. He was 2002 Second Team All League. He was the first men's soccer player to ever be drafted from Liberty University. Gomez spent three seasons in Charlotte then moved to the Virginia Beach Mariners in 2004. He played two seasons with the Mariners, then retired from professional soccer on June 2, 2005.

== Coach ==
In 2005, Gomez moved to Palm Beach, Florida where he became the head coach of the Palm Beach Atlantic University soccer team. He was named the Men's Associate Head Coach at his alma mater Liberty University in January 2014. Most recently, Gomez is the Division I Head Coach at Charleston Southern University since 2020.

== Family ==
In 2005, Jose married Carrie Cruciano in Virginia Beach, Virginia. The two met through mutual friends at Liberty University. They have three children and reside in Charleston, South Carolina.

== Honors ==
- Liberty University
  - 2000 Big South Player of the Year
  - 2013 Named to the inaugural Big South Conference All-Decade Team. Part of the Big South's 30th anniversary celebration, the all-decade teams were determined by conference administrators and fan voting.
  - Liberty University Hall of Fame Inductee 2022.
- Charlotte Eagles
  - 2002 Second Team All League
- Palm Beach Atlantic University
  - NCCAA Coach of the Year 2010.
