= Valrico, Florida =

- Census-designated place
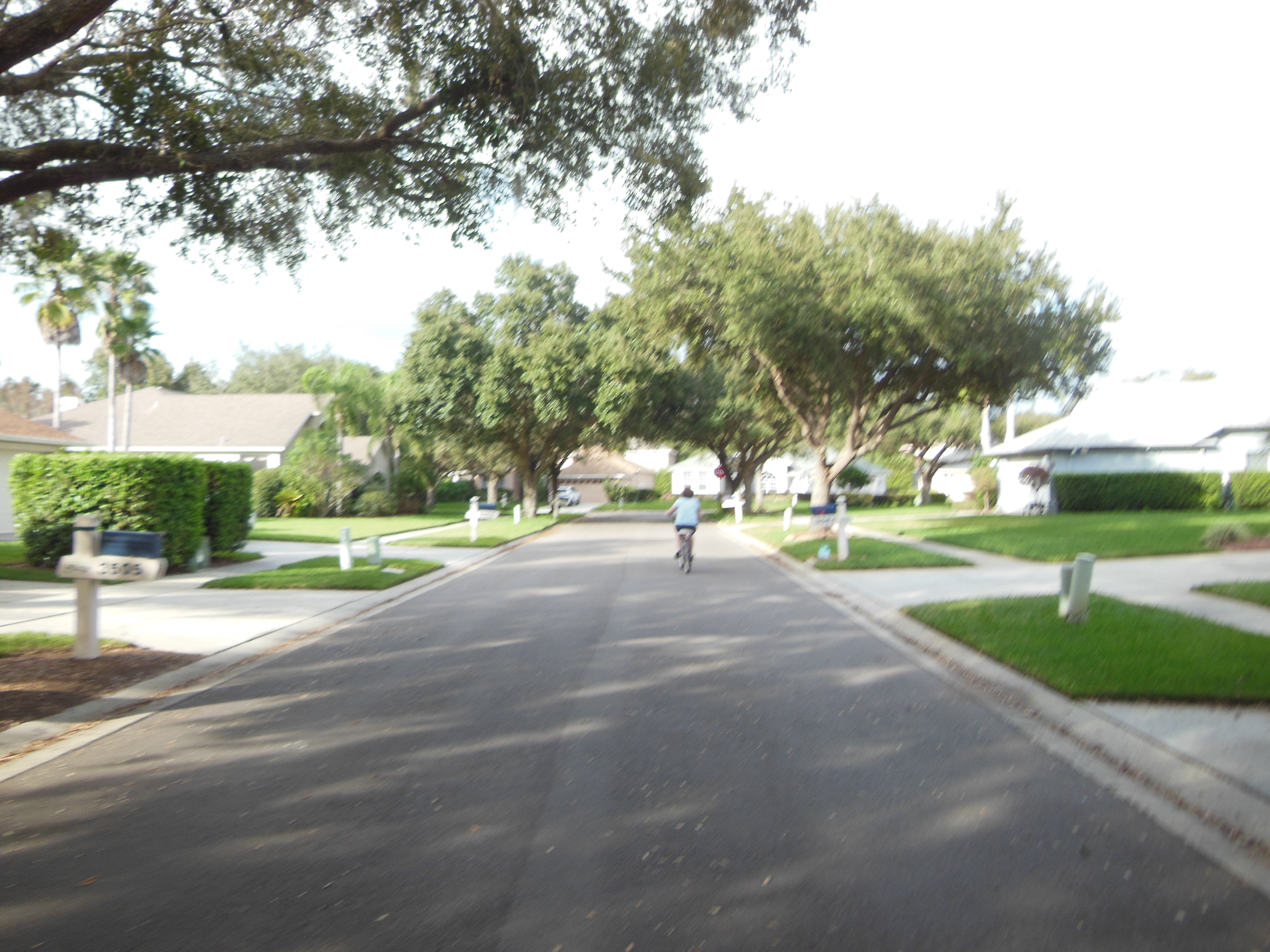
- Cyclist in Valrico residential street

- Location in Hillsborough County and the state of Florida
- Coordinates: 27°54′28″N 82°13′50″W
- Country: United States
- State: Florida
- County: Hillsborough

Area
  - Total: 14.22 sq mi (36.84 km^{2})
  - Land: 13.81 sq mi (35.77 km^{2})
  - Water: 0.42 sq mi (1.08 km^{2})
- Elevation: 102 ft (31 m)

Population (2020)
  - Total: 37,895
  - Density: 2,744.2/sq mi (1,059.55/km^{2})
- Time zone: UTC-5 (Eastern (EST))
  - Summer (DST): UTC-4 (EDT)
- ZIP codes: 33594-33596
- Area codes: 813, 656
- FIPS code: 12-73700
- GNIS feature ID: 2402959

Valrico is a census-designated place (CDP) in Hillsborough County, Florida, United States. As of 2020 the population was 37,895.

== History ==
Before the Civil War, the area was known as Long Pond and consisted of several cotton plantations. It was renamed Valrico, meaning "rich valley" in Spanish, in the 1880s when William G. Tousey, a philosophy professor from Tufts College, purchased property in the area. In 1890, an influx of immigrants arrived, following the construction of the Florida Central and Peninsular Railroad through the area.

When the railroad was completed, Tousey began building up the community with retail stores, streets, and a bank. In 1893, Mr. Bryan built a steam mill at Valrico station. In 1895, a major freeze halted these developments, and the population began to dwindle. Nonetheless, the town continued, and a schoolhouse was completed in 1896. The population continued to fall, from 100 people in 1893 to only 50 in 1911.

This setback did not deter local landowners from pushing forward with the town's development. From 1910 to 1914 Judge Hamner, Governor Van Sant, D. Humbird, W.H., S.C. Phipps and W.F. Miller started an improvement project along Hopewell Road, later designated SR 60. W.F. Miller, serving as president of the Valrico Improvement Association, raised $3,500 to erect the Valrico Civic Center, now known as the James McCabe Theater. The area's first general store was opened by Lovett Brandon in 1912.

Valrico once again suffered a major blow during the stock market crash of 1929, which saw nearly every business in the town shut down. Not until the mid-1950s did the town begin to see growth again, primarily due to the connection of SR 60 to Tampa's Adamo Drive, placing Valrico right along a major Florida thoroughfare.

== Geography ==
Valrico is located in east-central Hillsborough County. It is bordered to the west by Brandon, to the southwest by Bloomingdale, and to the south by FishHawk. Via State Road 60, it is 14 miles (23 km) east of Tampa and 26 miles (42 km) west of Bartow. It is 10 miles (16 km) southwest of Plant City.

According to the United States Census Bureau, the Valrico CDP has a total area of 14.2 square miles (36.8 km^{2}), of which 13.8 square miles (35.8 km^{2}) are land and 0.42 square miles (1.1 km^{2}), or 2.92%, are water.

== Demographics ==
Historical population
Census	Pop.	Note	%±
2000	6,582		—
2010	35,545		440.0%
2020	37,895		6.6%

=== Racial and ethnic composition ===
Valrico racial composition (Hispanics excluded from racial categories) (NH = Non-Hispanic)
Race	Pop 2010	Pop 2020	% 2010	% 2020
White (NH)	24,660	22,827	69.38%	60.24%
Black or African American (NH)	2,883	3,392	8.11%	8.95%
Native American or Alaska Native (NH)	73	97	0.21%	0.26%
Asian (NH)	1,376	1,799	3.87%	4.75%
Pacific Islander or Native Hawaiian (NH)	15	14	0.04%	0.04%
Some other race (NH)	100	196	0.28%	0.52%
Two or more races/Multiracial (NH)	635	1,608	1.79%	4.24%
Hispanic or Latino (any race)	5,803	7,962	16.33%	21.01%
Total	35,545	37,895		

=== 2020 census ===
As of the 2020 census, Valrico had a population of 37,895. The median age was 43.1 years. 22.7% of residents were under the age of 18 and 18.4% of residents were 65 years of age or older. For every 100 females there were 92.3 males, and for every 100 females age 18 and over there were 89.5 males age 18 and over.

100.0% of residents lived in urban areas, while 0.0% lived in rural areas.

There were 13,708 households in Valrico, of which 33.8% had children under the age of 18 living in them. Of all households, 60.2% were married-couple households, 11.6% were households with a male householder and no spouse or partner present, and 22.5% were households with a female householder and no spouse or partner present. About 18.3% of all households were made up of individuals and 9.3% had someone living alone who was 65 years of age or older. There were 10,337 families residing in the CDP.

There were 14,347 housing units, of which 4.5% were vacant. The homeowner vacancy rate was 1.8% and the rental vacancy rate was 5.1%.

Racial composition as of the 2020 census
Race	Number	Percent
White	24,811	65.5%
Black or African American	3,616	9.5%
American Indian and Alaska Native	156	0.4%
Asian	1,819	4.8%
Native Hawaiian and Other Pacific Islander	14	0.0%
Some other race	2,150	5.7%
Two or more races	5,329	14.1%
Hispanic or Latino (of any race)	7,962	21.0%

=== 2010 census ===
As of the 2010 United States census, there were 35,545 people, 12,217 households, and 9,833 families residing in the CDP.

=== 2000 census ===
As of the census of 2000, there were 6,582 people, 2,632 households, and 1,826 families residing in the CDP. The population density was 1,176.9 inhabitants per square mile (454.4/km^{2}). There were 2,831 housing units at an average density of 506.2 per square mile (195.4/km^{2}). The racial makeup of the community was 89.32% White, 3.21% African American, 0.49% Native American, 1.47% Asian, 3.57% from other races, and 1.94% from two or more races. Hispanic or Latino of any race were 12.82% of the population.

In 2000, there were 2,632 households, out of which 29.4% had children under the age of 18 living with them, 57.0% were married couples living together, 8.4% had a female householder with no husband present, and 30.6% were non-families. 25.8% of all households were made up of individuals, and 14.4% had someone living alone who was 65 years of age or older. The average household size was 2.49 and the average family size was 2.99.

In 2000, in the CDP, the population was spread out, with 24.2% under the age of 18, 6.5% from 18 to 24, 29.1% from 25 to 44, 22.5% from 45 to 64, and 17.7% who were 65 years of age or older. The median age was 39 years. For every 100 females, there were 95.0 males. For every 100 females age 18 and over, there were 93.1 males.

In 2000, the median income for a household in the community was $98,700. and the median income for a family was $105,475. About 3.8% of families and 7.5% of the population were below the poverty line, including 7.3% of those under age 18 and 8.4% of those age 65 or over.

== Education ==
=== Public high schools ===
- Bloomingdale High School
- Durant High School
- Newsome High School

=== Public middle schools ===
- Barrington Middle School
- Burns Middle School
- Mulrennan Middle School
- Randall Middle School

=== Public elementary schools ===
- Alafia Elementary School
- Brooker Elementary School
- Buckhorn Elementary School
- Cimino Elementary School
- Lithia Springs Elementary
- Nelson Elementary School
- Valrico Elementary School
- Navigator Elementary School

=== Private schools ===
- Bell Shoals Baptist Academy PK-8
- F.I.S.H.(Home Schoolers)
- Foundation Christian Academy PK-12
- Grace Christian School K-12
- Interactive Education Academy K-12
- Trinity Christian Academy 2-12

== Notable people ==
- Jahleel Addae, professional football player
- Erin Andrews, TV personality
- Howie Auer, professional football player
- Glenn Beck, radio personality
- Melissa Beck, comedian
- Zach Bonner, philanthropist
- Michael Bradley, professional golfer
- Chad Bratzke, professional football player
- Jeff Curchin, football player
- Jimmy Del Ray, professional wrestler
- Tyler Danish, professional baseball player
- Ethan Fiore, professional bowler
- Jose Gomez, professional soccer player
- Matt Good, musician
- Agiye Hall, college football player
- Garry Hancock, professional baseball player
- Sterling Hofrichter, professional football player
- Albert Journeay, professional football player
- Carl Marchese, racecar driver
- Arjun Nimmala, baseball player
- Alissa Nutting, author
- Jeremy Rosado, singer
- Steve Runge, professional golfer
- Derek Smethurst, professional soccer and football player
- Ronda Storms, politician
- Colleen Walker, professional golfer
- Peter Tom Willis, professional football player
- William Martin Willis, musician
- Will Worth, football player
