= Lithia, Florida =

- Unincorporated community
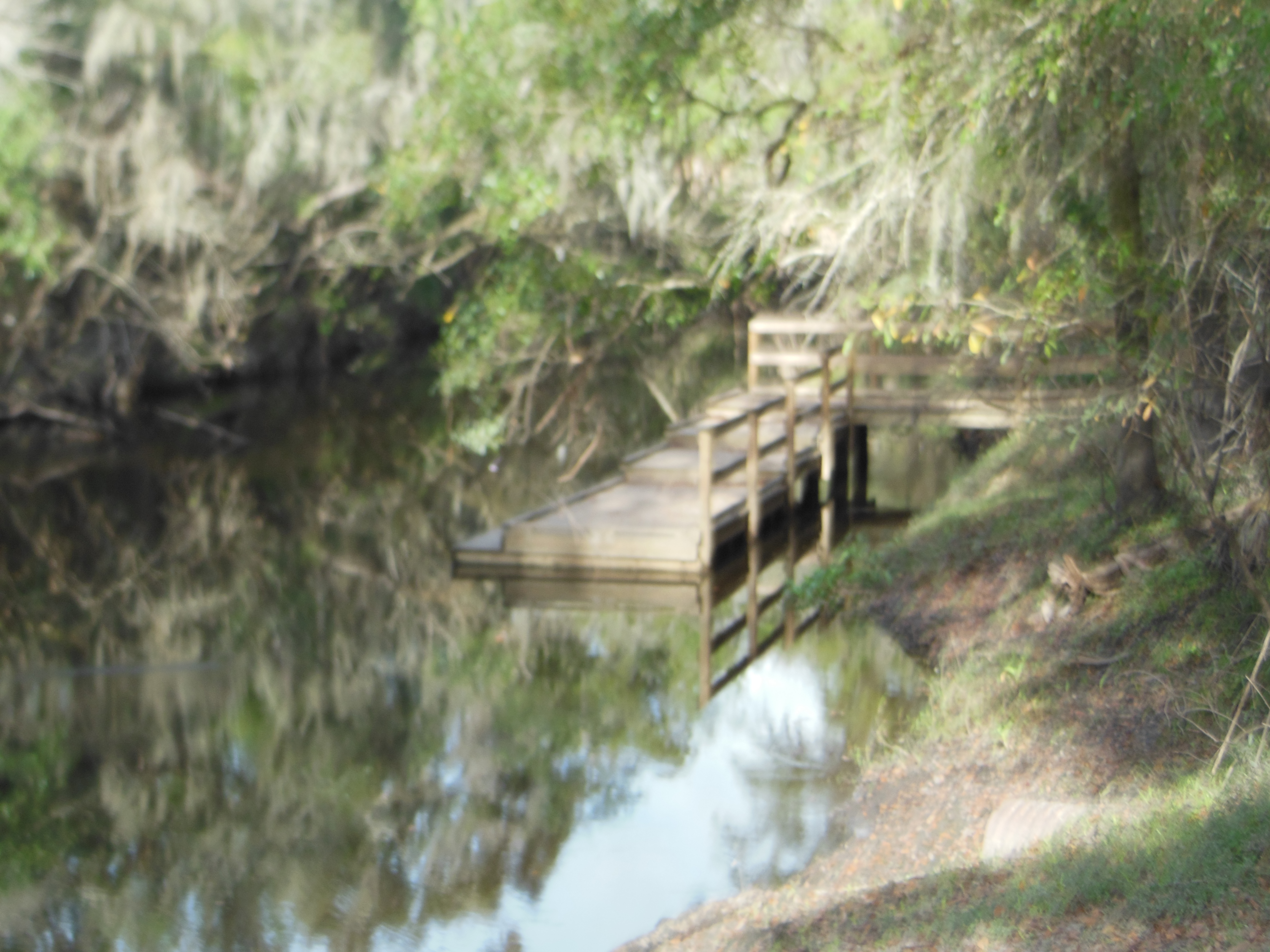
- Lithia Springs canoe ride

- Location within Florida Location within the United States
- Coordinates: 27°51′01″N 82°10′29″W
- Country: United States
- State: Florida
- County: Hillsborough
- Elevation: 105 ft (32 m)
- Time zone: UTC-5 (Eastern (EST))
  - Summer (DST): UTC-4 (EDT)
- ZIP codes: 33547, 33596
- Area code: 813
- GNIS feature ID: 285575

Lithia is an unincorporated community in Hillsborough County, Florida, United States. It is a suburb of Tampa. The ZIP codes are 33547, 33596, and the area code is 813. It is part of the census-designated place (CDP) of Fish Hawk. Lithia is home to the 2,963-acre (1,199 ha) Alafia River Corridor and 5,515-acre (2,232 ha) Chito Branch Reserve.

== Description ==
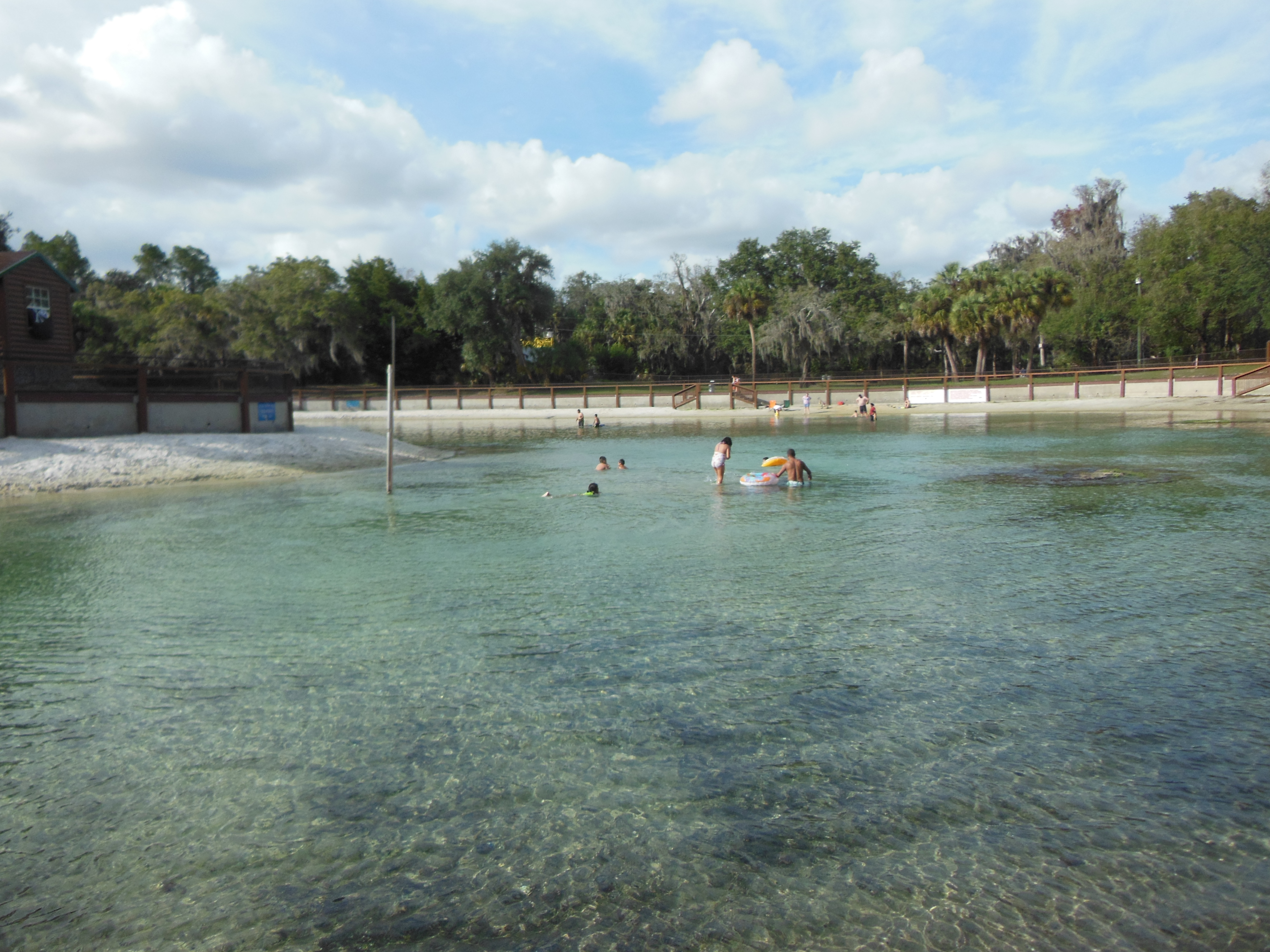
The swimming area at Lithia Springs Park

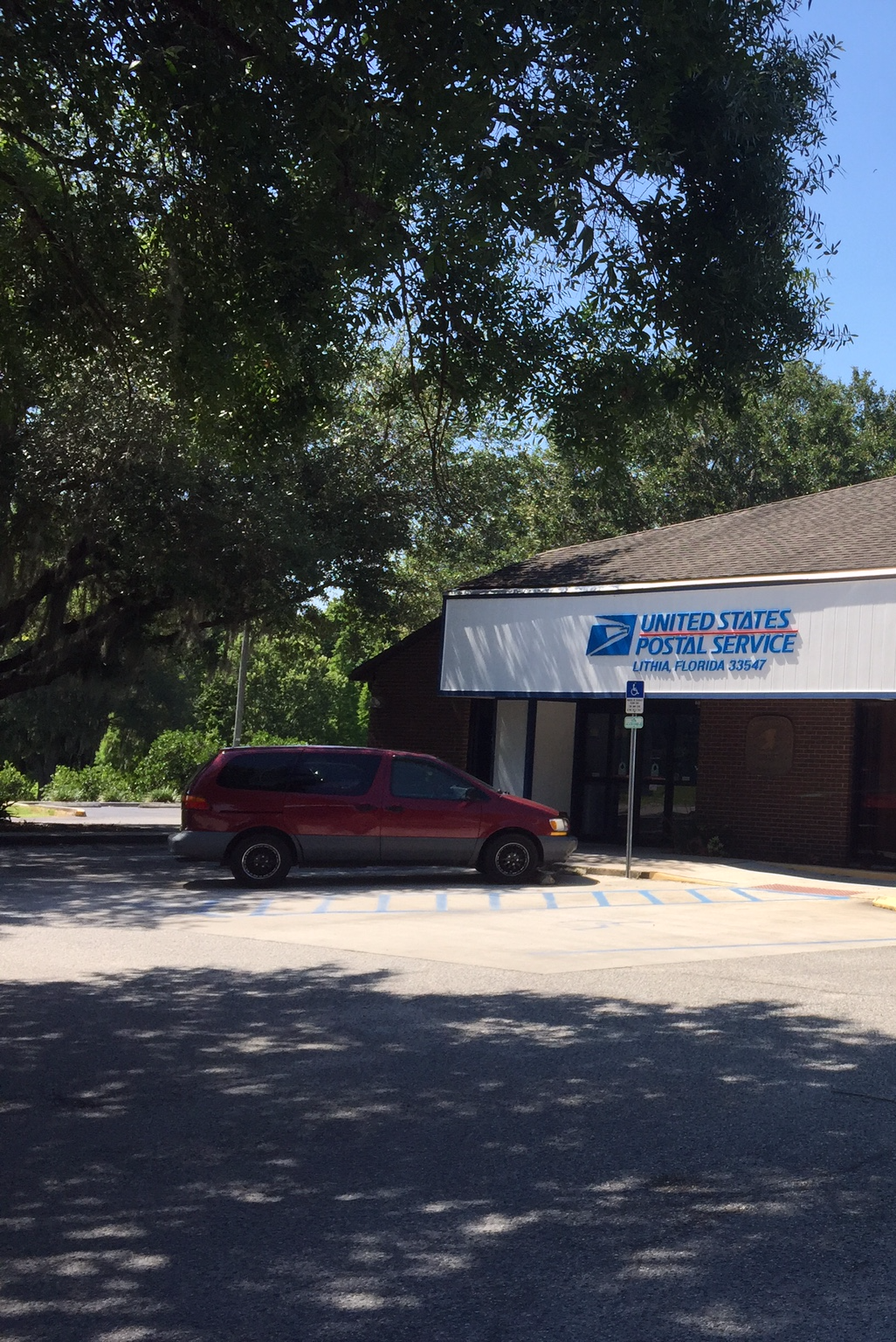
Lithia Post Office

Lithia is a small unincorporated community and home to Lithia Springs Regional Park, Alderman's Ford Regional Park, and the C.W. Bill Young Reservoir. The elevation ranges from less than 8 feet (2.4 m) above sea level at Lithia Springs to 105 feet (32 m) south of the post office.

The community has a rich history in agriculture, saw mills, and phosphate mining. In the late 1990s, Newland Communities purchased 3,000 acres (12 km^{2}) to develop Fishhawk Ranch. Fishhawk Trails was developed by another company, and more public works and retail stores are currently in development.

== History ==
Prior to the advent of European settlers in 1846, Lithia had been variously inhabited by Native American tribes, such as the Tocobaga, Muskogan (Creek), Tomokan, Caloosa, some of whom were mentioned by the Spanish in the 1600s, and later the Seminole. Settlers from Georgia arrived in 1847. In 1848, James Alderman created a ford on the Alafia River at the site of present-day Alderman's Ford Park. By the time of the Civil War, Alderman's cattle ranching operation ran to around 30,000 head of cattle. Around 1900, lithium was discovered in the waters of a spring (now known as Lithia Spring Major), which resulted in the naming of the community to "Lithia".

On February 21, 2017, United Parcel Service tested a vehicle-launched drone delivery in Lithia.

Lithia is the closest community to the coordinates listed as the launch site by Jules Verne in his 1865 novel From the Earth to the Moon.

== Geography ==
Lithia is located at (27.85, -82.19); or about 18 miles (29 km) ESE of Tampa.

== Education ==
Public schools:

- Barrington Middle School (6–8)
- Bevis Elementary (K-5)
- FishHawk Creek Elementary (K-5)
- Lithia Springs Elementary (K-5)
- Newsome High School (9–12)
- Pinecrest Elementary (K-5)
- Randall Middle School (6–8)
- Stowers Elementary (K-5)

Private schools:

- Foundation Christian Academy (Churches of Christ, K-12)
- St Stephen's Catholic School (Catholic, K-8)

== Economy ==
Lithia is headquarters for The Mosaic Company's international phosphate division. While most of the community consists of commuters to jobs at MacDill Air Force Base and elsewhere, there is still a large agricultural component with strawberry growers, citrus, tropical fish, blueberries and other crops. Lithia has also become a shooting destination, with one public and several private shooting ranges, as well as a sporting clays range.

== Notable people ==
- Mike Beltran, politician
- Evan Dempsey, baseball player
- Orlando Greene, Olympic runner
- Will Worth, football player
