= Alderman's Ford Regional Park =

Park in Florida, United States

Alderman's Ford Preserve
- Interactive map of Alderman's Ford Preserve
- Nearest city: Lithia, Florida
- Coordinates: 27.8656°N 82.2174°W
- Area: 2,963 acres (11,990,000 m^{2})

Alderman's Ford Preserve, is a preserve and park in Hillsborough County, Florida, in the United States. The park has two public access points for automobiles, from Thompson Road and from Florida State Road 39 as well as numerous access points for horse, foot or canoe access only. Eight miles of equestrian trails are located along the southern portion of the park, which borders Alafia River State Park roughly along the border of Jameson Road. A three mile long hiking loop over the Alafia River, a baseball park, picknicking and canoe rental facilities can be accessed at the Highway 39 entrance.

== History ==
The park is named for Alderman's Ford river crossing which in turn is named for James Alderman (1801-1880), a Florida Cracker cattle rancher, who is generally recognized to be the first American settler to settle in the area south of the Alafia River, with Alderman's Ford, near his homestead being the location where he first crossed the river.

Alderman created the crossing by cutting into the river's steep banks.

In 1893 Hillsborough County, contracted B. C. West to build a bridge over the Alafia at Alderman's Ford at a price of $300, but the bridge failed inspection and a new contract was granted to W. T. Pollard to rebuild the bridge for $500. The park has been a public gathering space since at least 1890. An annual political rally drawing thousands of people was held every April.
