= Alafia River Corridor Nature Preserve =

Park in Tampa, United States of America

- Location within Florida
- Location: Tampa, Florida
- Coordinates: 27.870586°N 82.137410°W
- Operator: Hillsborough County's Conservation and Environmental Lands Management Department

Alafia River Corridor Nature Preserve is a 4,700-acre area of protected lands in Hillsborough County, Florida. There are two trailheads for the preserve's hiking trails, one located at the north boundary of the Pinecrest Sports Complex on Hwy. 39 approximately one mile north of Hwy. 640 and one located on Hwy. 39 just north of Jameson Rd.

This nature preserve is managed by Hillsborough County's Conservation and Environmental Lands Management Department. The area helps protect a portion of the Alafia River, a tributary of Tampa Bay, and its floodplain. In addition to hiking, horseback riding, fishing, a picnic area, geocache stashes, and camping are provided for in the park.

== See also ==
- Fish Hawk Creek Preserve
- Southwest Florida Water Management District
- Florida state forests
- List of Florida state parks
