= Tampa Bay Water =

Tampa Bay Water (TBW) is a regional wholesale drinking water utility that serves customers in the Tampa Bay, Florida region. The agency is a special district of the state created by inter-local agreement among six member governments. A nine-member board of directors composed of two elected commissioners from each member county and one elected representative from each member city oversees the policy decisions of the agency. The member governments that make up the board of directors are: The cities of New Port Richey, St. Petersburg, Florida, and Tampa, and Hillsborough County, Pasco County, and Pinellas County. These member governments provide water to over 2.5 million citizens.

Tampa Bay Water, formerly the West Coast Regional Water Supply Authority, was created in 1998 to deliver drinking water in an environmentally sound, cost-effective and reliable manner. To achieve these goals, the Agency created a diversified water supply system to reduce dependence on a sole source—groundwater. The regional utility built the C.W. Bill Young Regional Reservoir of 15,500,000,000 US gallons (59,000,000 m^{3}), a seawater desalination plant with a maximum output of 25,000,000 US gallons (95,000 m^{3}) per day, a surface water treatment plant with a maximum output of 120,000,000 US gallons (450,000 m^{3}) per day, and interconnected more than 200 miles (320 km) of large-diameter pipeline. The system spans over 2,000 square miles (5,200 km^{2}) to deliver drinking water at an average rate of 171,000,000 US gallons (650,000 m^{3}) per day.

The region's water sources are:

- Surface water from the Alafia River, Hillsborough River and Tampa Bypass Canal
- Reverse osmosis desalinated seawater from Tampa Bay
- Groundwater from regional well fields

== Board of directors ==
- Chairman: Sandra Murman, Hillsborough County Commissioner
- Vice Chairman: Dave Eggers, Pinellas County Commissioner
- Pat Gerard, Pinellas County Commissioner
- Pat Kemp, Hillsborough County Commissioner
- Rob Marlowe, Mayor, New Port Richey
- Charlie Miranda, Tampa Councilman
- Ron Oakley, Pasco County Commissioner
- Darden Rice, St. Petersburg Councilwoman
- Kathryn Starkey, Pasco County Commissioner
