= C. W. Bill Young Regional Reservoir =

C.W. Bill Young Regional Reservoir
- Location within Florida Location within the United States
- Location: Hillsborough County, Florida
- Coordinates: 27°48′10″N 82°10′40″W
- Type: Reservoir
- Basin countries: United States
- Surface area: 1,100 acres (450 ha)
- Water volume: 15.5 billion US gallons (59,000,000 m^{3})

The C.W. Bill Young Regional Reservoir is a 15.5 billion US gallons (59,000,000 m^{3}) reservoir which collects water from the Alafia and Hillsborough Rivers in central Florida. It is named for C.W. Bill Young, the U.S. Congressman from Florida's 10th congressional district. Tampa Bay Water, the regional water authority for Hillsborough, Pinellas and Pasco counties, worked for nearly a decade in constructing the reservoir, which was completed in June 2005, and officially opened on 15 October 2005.

== Background ==
The 1,100-acre (4.5 km^{2}) reservoir is impounded by an earthen embankment that cost $146 million to build, of which $57 million came from Federal funds. It can store 15.5 billion US gallons (59,000,000 m^{3}) of water, enough to provide about one quarter of its service area's drinking water for six months. This eases demand on well water from the Floridan Aquifer. The surrounding 5,200-acre (21 km^{2}) tract of land in Hillsborough County is designated as a wildlife preserve to maintain habitat. In 2007, drought had reduced the amount of water stored in the reservoir to less than half its capacity. This necessitated considering pumping water from the Alafia into the reservoir during the rainy season for use during the dry season.

== 2006 Lawsuit ==
In 2006, Tampa Bay Water discovered cracking along nearly 40% of the reservoir's interior lining. A third-party engineering firm was hired to investigate the cause and reported that the cracking was the result of water being trapped in the earthen embankment. The resulting repairs were estimated at $121 million. Tampa Bay Water sought damages from the embankment's construction and engineering companies. A $30 million settlement offer from the embankment's engineer-of-record, HDR, Inc., was rejected by Tampa Bay Water and the case proceeded to court. In April 2012, a federal jury ruled that the design firm was not liable for the damages. In a November 2012 ruling in which he called the legal battle "no ordinary engineering malpractice case," U.S. Judge James D. Whittemore determined the utility owed HDR more than $20 million in legal fees as a result of April 2012's jury verdict. The court document cited TBW's own legal expenses at more than $11.6 million. A federal appeals court in Atlanta issued a 33-page ruling on September 23, 2013, rejecting the utility's arguments that the trial judge had committed a series of errors that should be overturned. As a result, the cost of the multi-million-dollar repair work will likely fall on the shoulders of the 2 million ratepayers in Pinellas, Pasco and Hillsborough counties.
