= Foundation Christian Academy =

Location
- 3955 Lithia Pinecrest Road; Valrico, (Hillsborough County), Florida; United States; 27°52′58″N 82°13′50″W

Information
- Type: Private School
- Motto: Preparing hands to serve the community and feet to serve the world with love, joy, peace patience, kindness, goodness, faithfulness, gentleness and self-control.
- Established: 1992; 34 years ago
- School district: Hillsborough
- Principal: Jonathan Smith; (middle and high schools); Sherri Smith; (preschool and elementary school)
- Grades: PK–12
- Enrollment: 400 (2017)
- Colors: Burgundy, White, and Navy
- Team name: Panthers
- Rivals: Seffner Christian
- Accreditation: National Christian School Association
- Website: foundationchristianacademy.org

Foundation Christian Academy (FCA) is a private Christian school serving pre-kindergarten through high school students located in Valrico, Florida, United States. It was established in 1992. Foundation Christian Academy enrolls over 400 students. Originally co-located in Bell Shoals Church of Christ, the school moved to its current location on the former site of a miniature horse farm on Lithia-Pinecrest road in 2005. In 2016, the school purchased 20 additional acres of land adjacent to the existing 6.5-acre site. A gymnasium was completed in the fall of 2016.

== Athletics ==
The school's athletic teams are referred to as the Panthers. FCA has competed in the FHSAA since 2008 and fields teams in basketball, cross-country, soccer, and volleyball. By 2020 the school plans to add football, flag football, and track and field. The school also hosts the Tony Saladino III Baseball Academy.
