= Lithia Springs Regional Park =

Park in Lithia, Florida

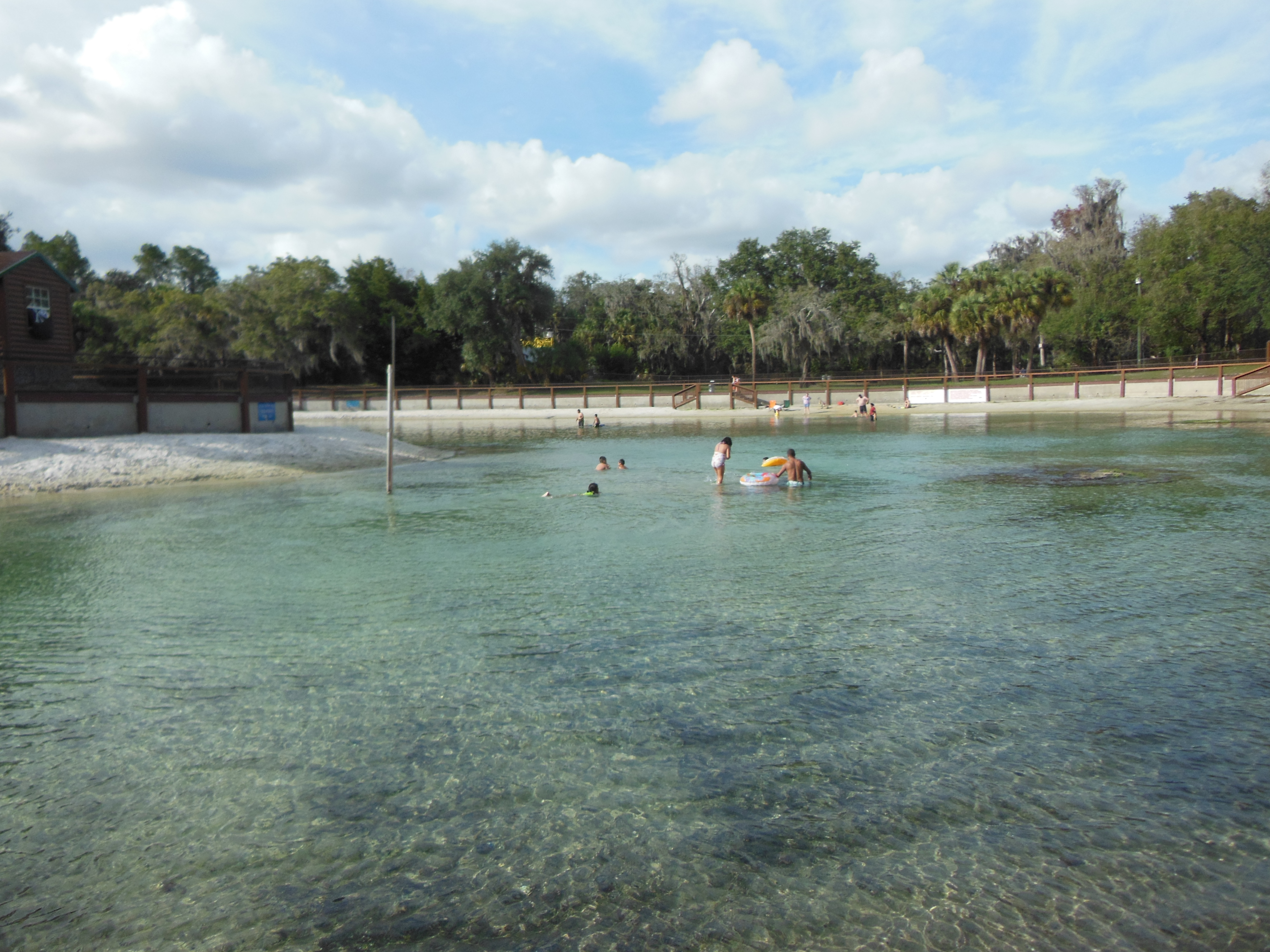
- Interactive map of Lithia Springs Regional Park
- Nearest city: Lithia, Florida
- Coordinates: 27.865°N 82.229°W
- Area: 160 acres (650,000 m^{2})

Lithia Springs Regional Park, is a park in Lithia, Hillsborough County, Florida, in the United States. The park's major attraction is a natural spring from which water flows year-round at a temperature of 72 degrees. Sixty per-cent of the park is surrounded by the Alafia River, into which the water from the spring flows.

In addition to the popular swimming area, the park includes forty-five campsites and two indoor shower facilities, as well as canoe and kayak launch facilities. There is a large grassy area, a fishing dock, volleyball, and hiking trails.

A circular trail between the park and Alderman's Ford Regional Park is being planned by the Southwest Florida Water Management District (SwiftMud) and the Environmental Lands Acquisition and Protection Program (ELAPP).

== Lithia Spring Major ==
The spring, officially known as Lithia Spring Major, is located 500 feet from the Alafia River, into which it discharges an average of 35 million gallons of water per day. Lithia Springs is within the Floridan Aquifer, and is recharged by precipitation falling within five to ten miles of the vent. The spring vent lies in 10–15 feet of water, underneath an outcropping of limestone, which is part of the Arcadia Formation, and is protected by a steel grate. As the water is very clear, the vent is clearly visible in the swimming area. The water is a year-round temperature of 72 degrees, making it the warmest in Central Florida. The water contains nitrates, sulfates, as well as a trace amount of its namesake Lithium. Research by the WQMP shows the elevated level of nitrates is caused by fertilizer applied to citrus close to the spring. A portion of the water is diverted to an industrial facility operated by the Mosaic fertilizer mining company.
