= Alafia River =

River in Florida, United States

Alafia River Tributary to Hillsborough Bay
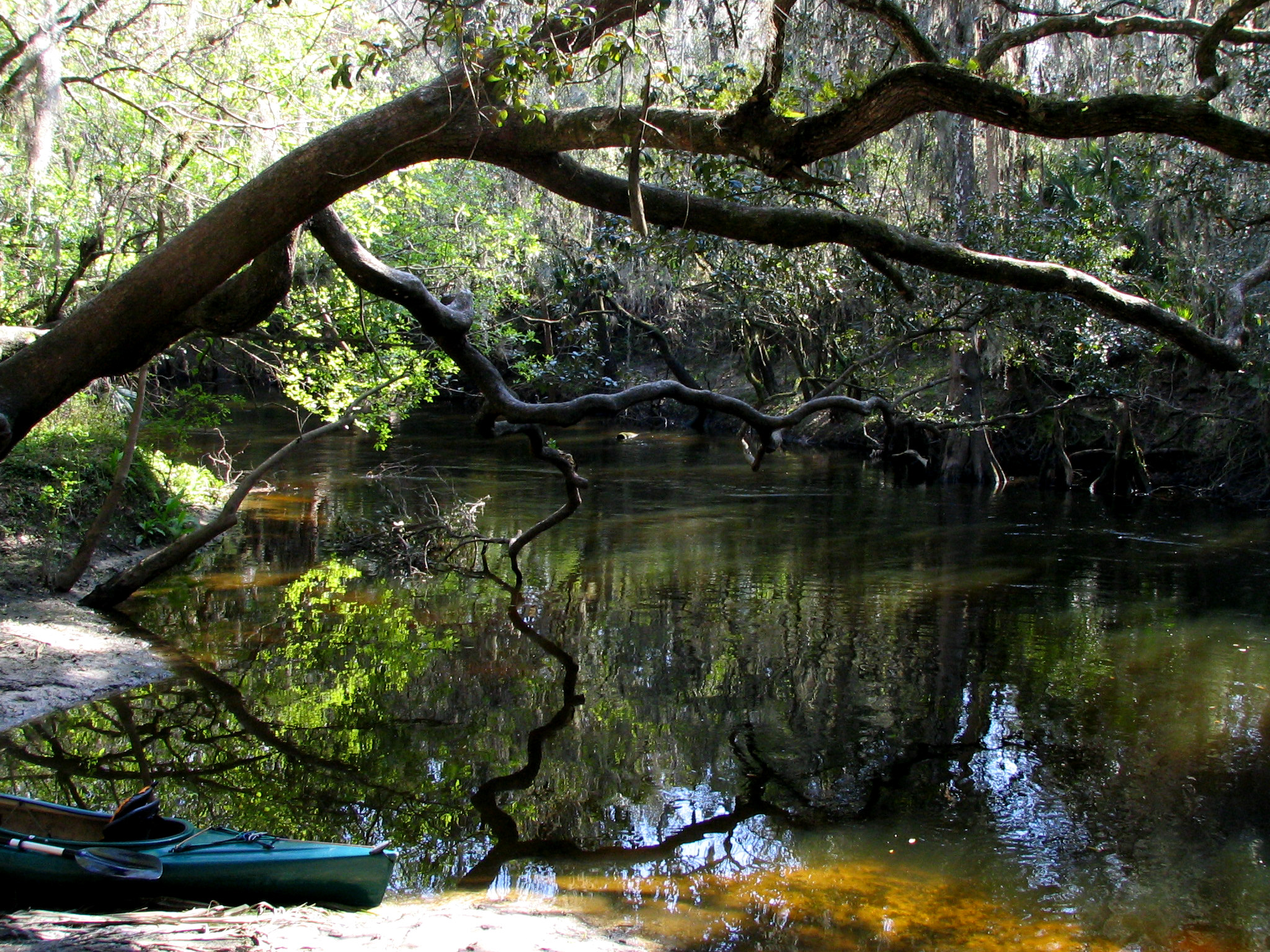

- Location of Alafia River mouth Alafia River (the United States)

Location
- Country: United States
- State: Florida
- County: Hillsborough

Physical characteristics
- Source: Confluence of North and South Prongs of Alafia River
  - location: about 1.5 miles north-northeast of Pinecrest, Florida
  - coordinates: 27°51′46″N 82°08′20″W
  - elevation: 38 ft (12 m)
- Mouth: Hillsborough Bay
  - location: Gibsonton, Florida
  - coordinates: 27°51′11″N 82°24′1″W
  - elevation: 0 ft (0 m)
- Length: 48.49 mi (78.04 km)
- Basin size: 400.84 square miles (1,038.2 km^{2})
- Discharge
  - location: Hillsborough Bay
  - average: 315.84 cu ft/s (8.944 m^{3}/s) at mouth with Hillsborough Bay

Basin features
- Progression: Hillsborough Bay → Tampa Bay → Gulf of Mexico
- River system: Alafia River
- Tributaries
  - left: South Prong Alafia River; McDonald Branch; McCollough Branch; Little Fishhawk Creek; Fishhawk Creek; Bell Creek; Rice Creek
  - right: North Prong Alafia River; Turkey Creek; Buckhorn Creek
- Bridges: S County Road 39, Lithia Pinecrest Road, Bell Shoals Road, US 301, I-75, US 41

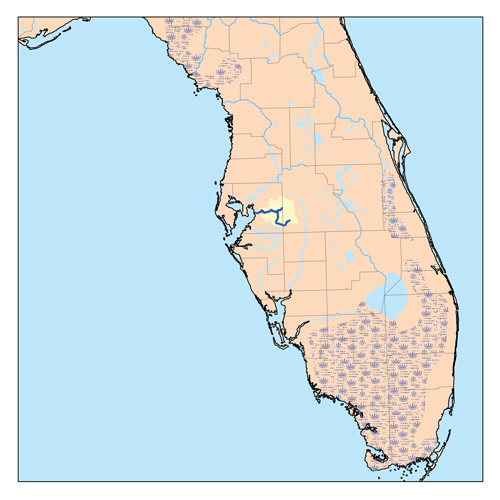

The Alafia River is 25 miles (40 km) long, with a watershed of 335 square miles (870 km^{2}) in Hillsborough County, Florida, United States, flowing into Tampa Bay. The watershed contains ten named lakes and ponds, and 29 named rivers, streams and canals. During the rainy season, excess water is pumped to the new C.W. Bill Young Regional Reservoir, which opened in 2005. The river is formed by two prongs. The north prong starts south of Mulberry and runs for 23.9 miles until it meets the south prong in Lithia. The south prong begins south of Bradley Junction and continues for 28.7 miles. The combined river then flows 24.7 miles west into Tampa Bay.

== History ==
For centuries the Alafia was home to various native tribes, including the Tocobaga. From their settlement at the mouth of the river to their hunting camps upstream, the natives left traces of their lives and activities. The Mocoso occupied the area around the mouth of the Alafia in the 16th century and were believed to speak Timucuan.

In the sixteenth century, the expeditions of Pánfilo de Narváez and Hernando de Soto explored the coastal areas of Tampa Bay and visited the Native Americans, making the first written account and charting the first maps of the Alafia River.

After the end of the Second Seminole War, under the terms of the Armed Occupation Act of Florida, American settlers began to arrive, starting with Benjamin Moody in 1843. They settled on the South side of the river around what is now US Highway 301 at the site that later became known as Peru. Shortly thereafter the Barnes family took up residence around Bell Shoals. By 1867, a ferry was operated by Reverend LeRoy Lesley, a Methodist preacher. A second ferry near Lithia Springs was operated by John Carney.

Due to the river's tendency to undergo moderate to high-level flooding approximately twice a year, numerous residences in the vicinity have been constructed on stilts.

== Parks ==
Parks on the river with Hillsborough County include Alafia River State Park, Alderman's Ford Regional Park, Lithia Springs Regional Park, the Alafia Scrub Nature Preserve and the Riverview Civic Center. Williams Park and Mosaic Park are on the river near its mouth. The Alafia River Reserve is in Polk County near Mulberry.

== Phosphate spills ==
In 1997 a dam atop a gypsum stack at a Mulberry Phosphates fertilizer plant broke, spilling 56 million gallons of acidic wastewater into the North Fork of the Alafia. Virtually everything in the 42 miles between Mulberry and Hillsborough Bay was killed. In addition to killing millions of fish and hundreds of acres of vegetation, the spill dumped 350 tons of nitrogen into Tampa Bay. Rather than pay fines, Mulberry Phosphates declared bankruptcy. Five years later, only $3.7 million was recovered from the company's insurance company. In 2002, Mosaic took over maintenance of the stack. In 2007, the cost of closing both stacks was estimated to be $48 million, which will be paid to Mosaic by the Florida Department of Environmental Protection. After closure, Mosaic will be responsible for maintaining the stacks for the next 50 years. In 2016 an additional 215 million gallons entered the aquifer through the stack through a sinkhole. Mosaic publicly stated that no additional water would be released into the Alafia, but soon thereafter started diluting and releasing additional water contaminated with phosphates into the river.

== Literature ==
Jules Verne used the Alafia as the site of the fictional moon launch in his 1865 novel From the Earth to the Moon. He described the moon shot taking place from 1,800-foot bluffs overlooking the Alafia, around what is now today's Bell Shoals Nature Preserve.

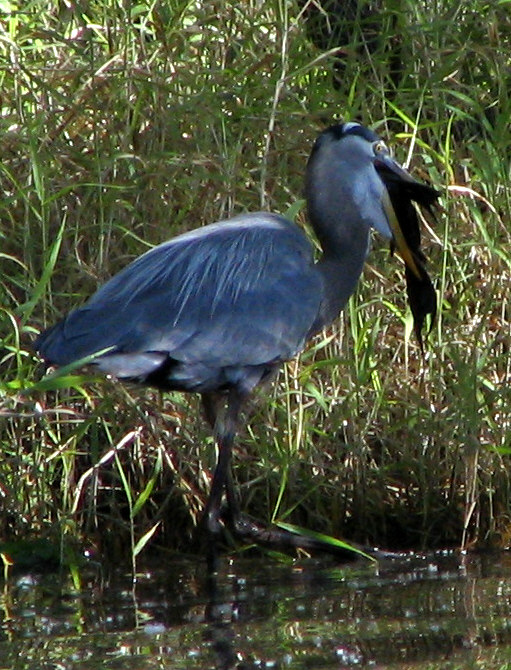
Great blue heron

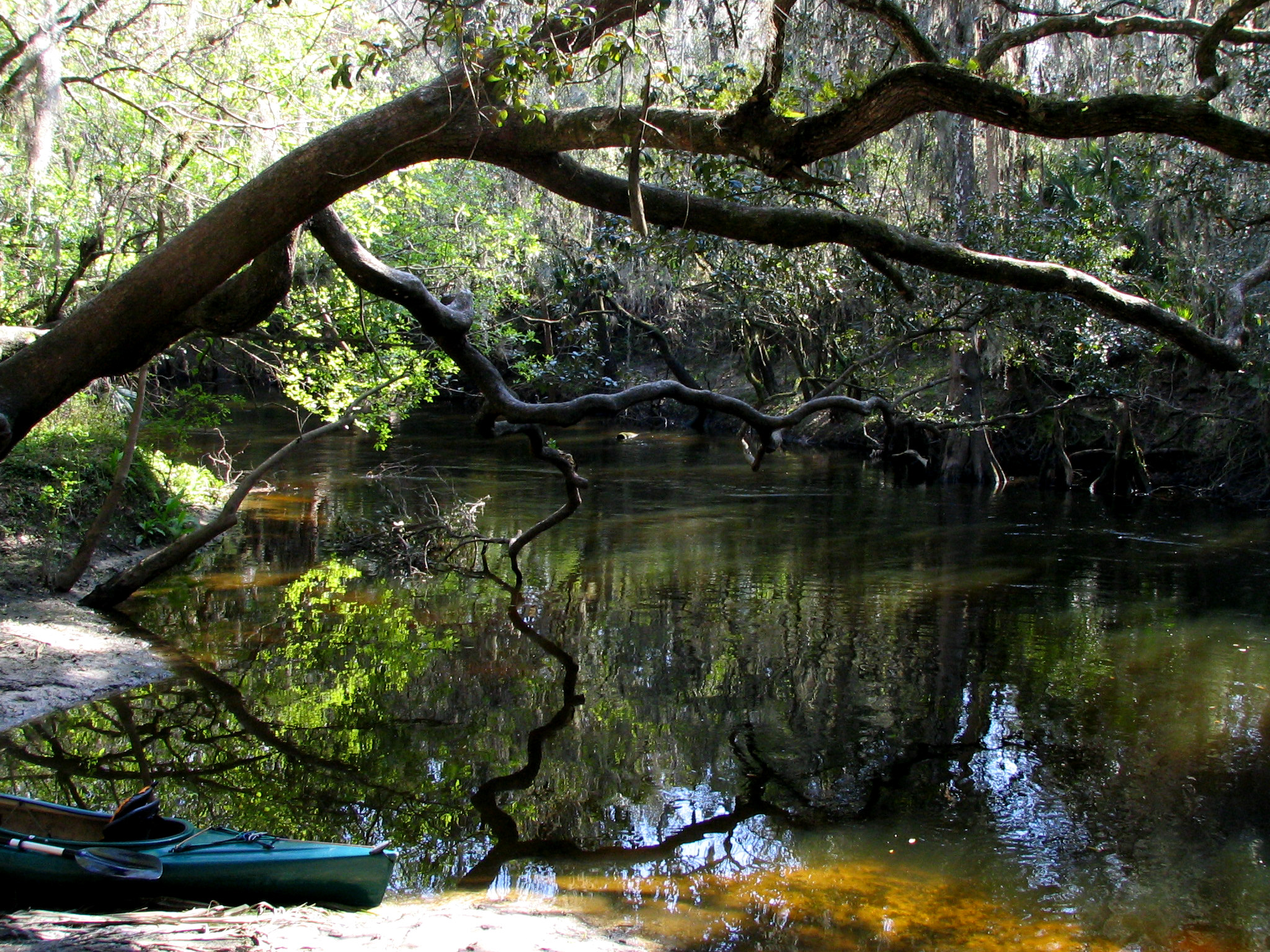
On the Alafia River near Lithia Springs Park

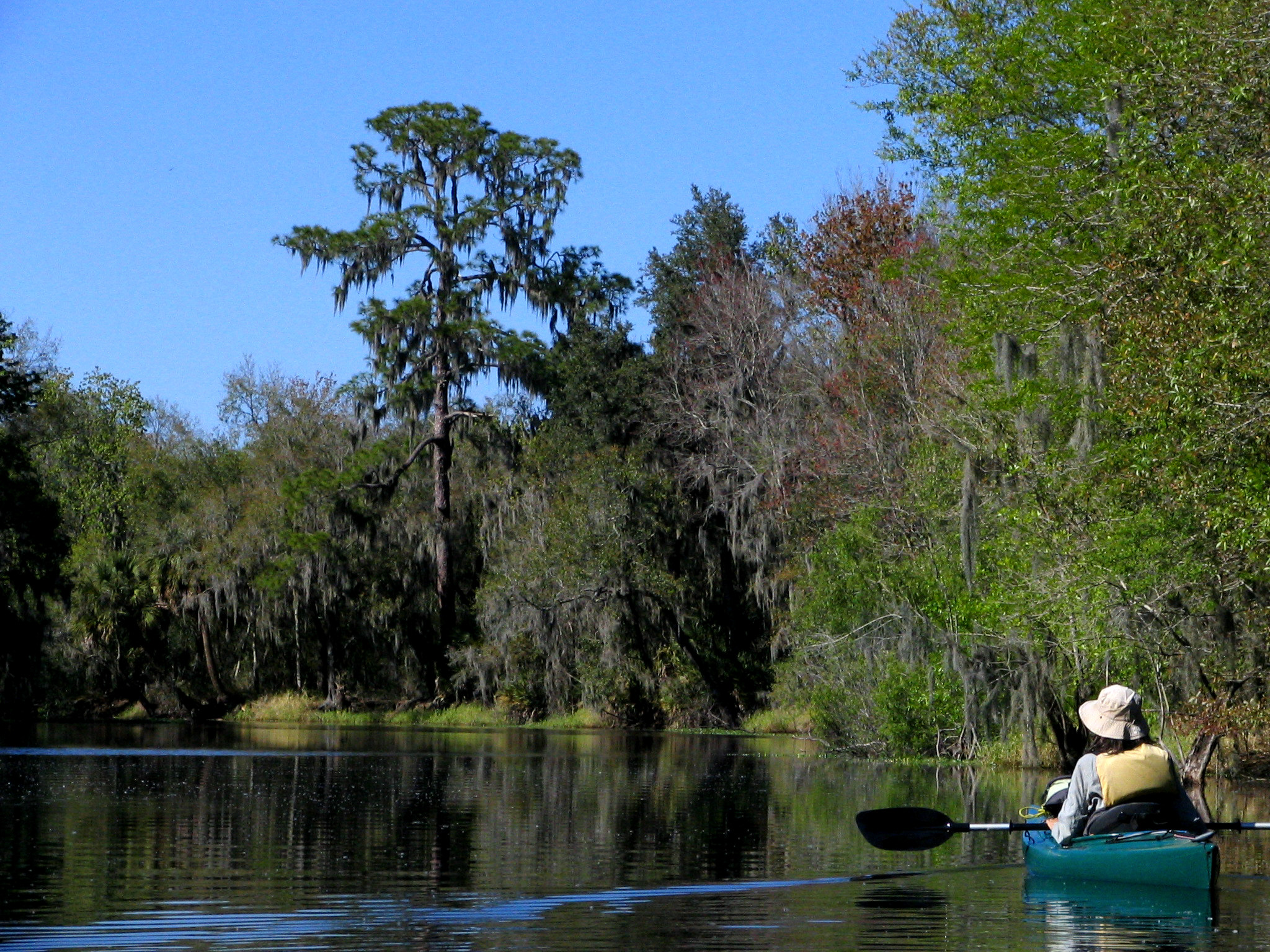
Hurrah Lake on the Alafia River

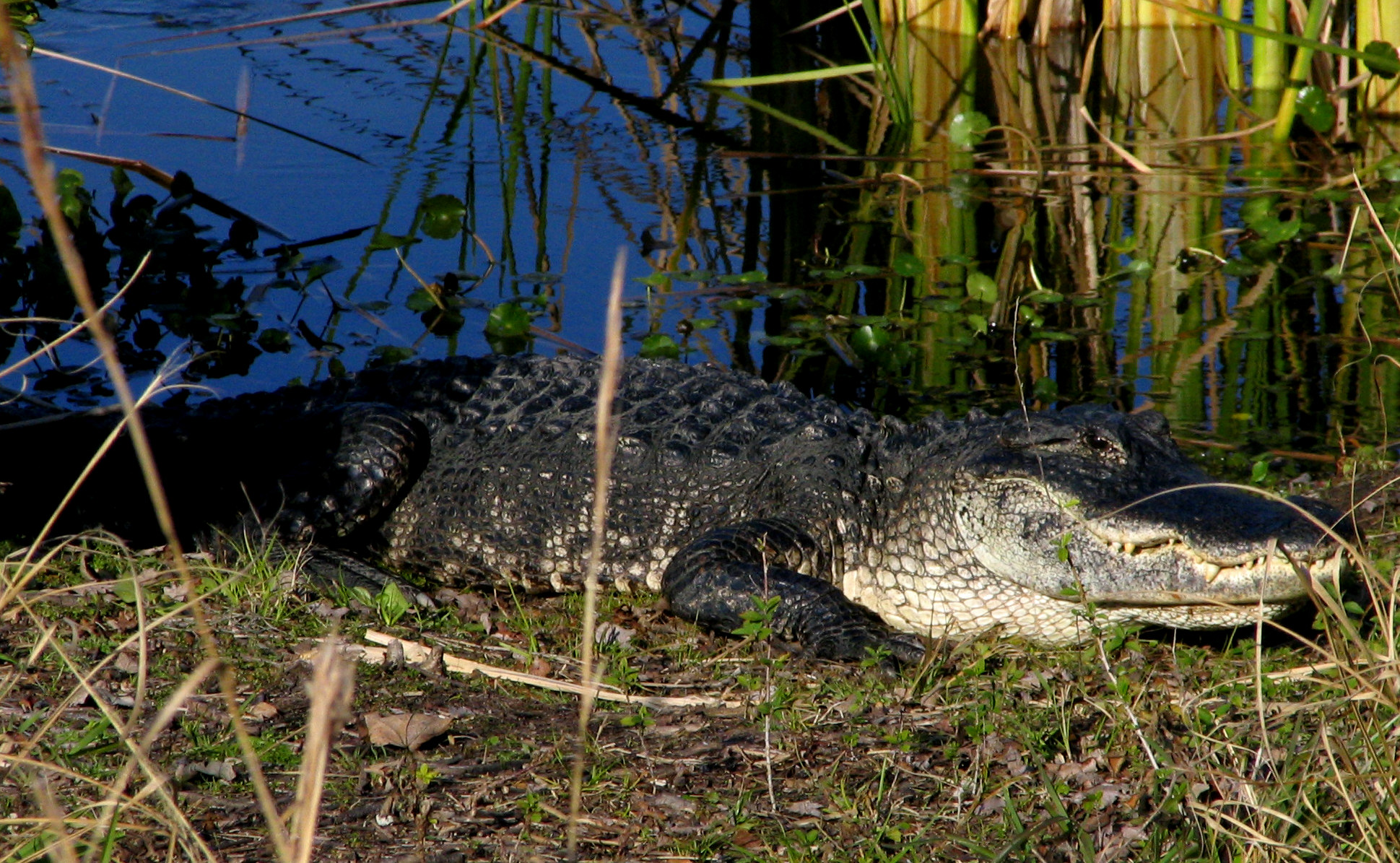
An alligator near the State Park campground

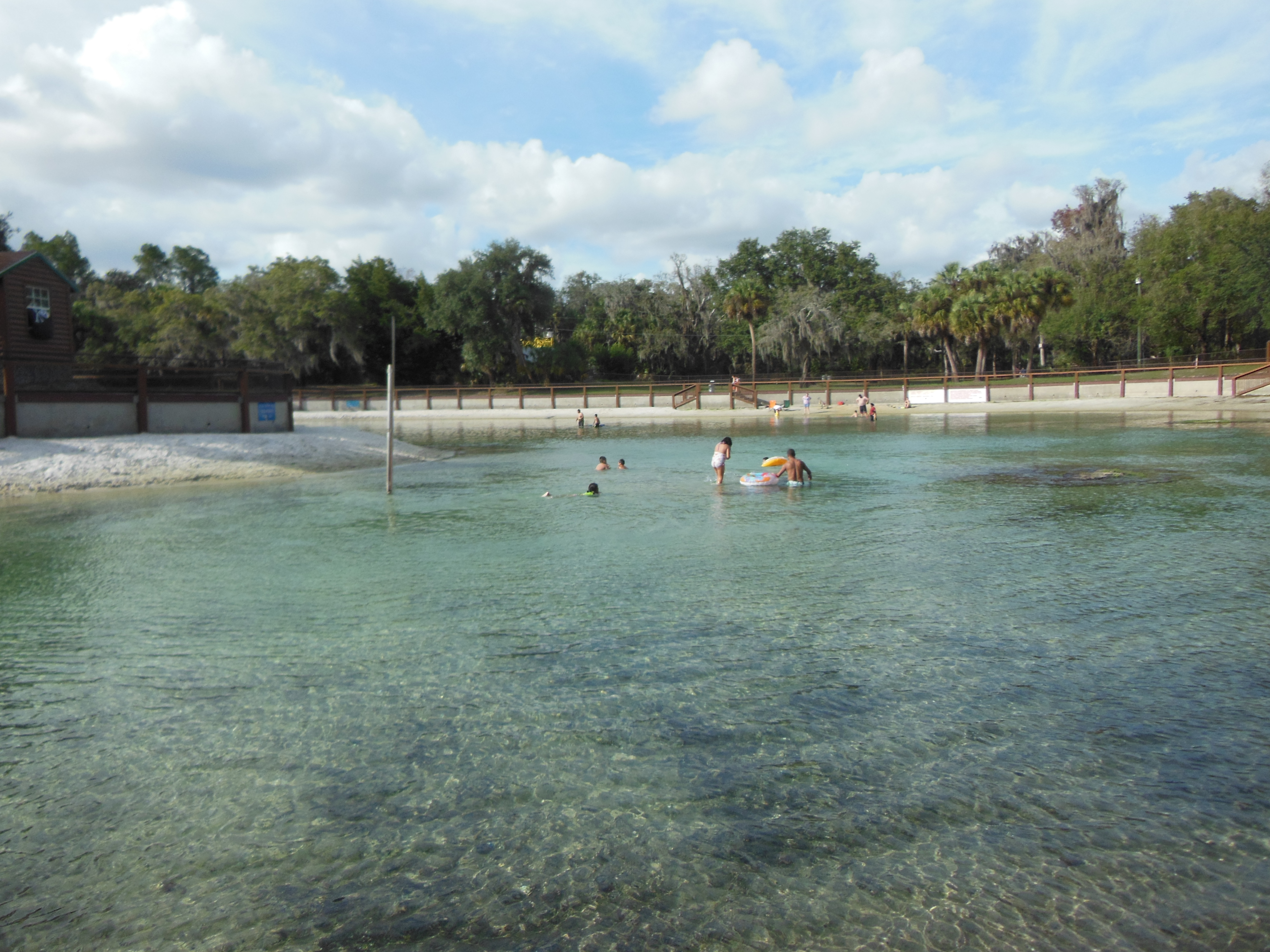
Lithia Springs Park swimming area
