= Balm-Boyette Scrub Nature Preserve =

Nature preserve in Hillsborough County, Florida

- Location within Florida
- Location: Hillsborough County, Florida, United States
- Nearest city: Lithia, Florida
- Coordinates: 27.780°N 82.207°W
- Governing body: Hillsborough County, Florida; Swiftmud

The Balm-Boyette Scrub Nature Preserve is a 5,723-acre (2,316 ha) preserve located in Hillsborough County, Florida. It was purchased through joint funding from the County's Environmental Lands Acquisition and Protection Program (ELAPP) and the State of Florida's Conservation and Recreation Lands (CARL) Program. While it consists largely of abandoned phosphate pits, it has a large area of undisturbed scrub habitat. Natural habitats within the site include sand pine scrub, xeric oak scrub, pine flatwoods, hardwood hammock, wet prairie, freshwater marsh, cypress swamp, and hardwood swamp. During the 1960s (and prior) the land was pitted with phosphate mines. The natural waterflow had been altered from its original state into a series of stagnant pools. In 2016, a project was undertaken under the umbrella of Swiftmud's Surface Water Improvement and Management, or SWIM, program. The project will create a "habitat mosaic" with habitat for wading birds as well as upland creatures.

Many protected species of plants and animals have been documented on the site, including Florida golden aster, Curtiss' Milkweed, Eastern indigo snake, Sherman's fox squirrel, Florida sandhill crane (Grus canadensis pratensis), Southeastern American kestrel (Falco sparverius paulus), and gopher tortoise. Invasive species, such as the Argentine Tegu lizard, have also been spotted in the preserve.

The 971-acre (393 ha) Triple Creek Preserve adjoins Balm-Boyette Scrub's north boundary. The park contains over 20 miles (32 km) of biking trails. The trails are maintained by a volunteer organization, the SouthWest Association of Mountain Bike Pedalers (SWAMP). Just over 2 miles (3.2 km) of hiking trails have been added here linking to the Balm-Boyette trail. In the future, a second parking area will be added at the "Deuces R Wild" gate at 13299 Balm-Boyette Rd. The area got its name from the three creeks that run through portions of the property—Bell Creek, Boggy Creek, and Fish Hawk Creek, all of which flow into the Alafia River. The preserve has a mix of wetland and upland habitat types, including pine flat- woods, wetland forests, and improved pasture areas. It is home to many rare species of plants and animals including flakelet fern and grass-pink orchids.

Triple Creek was jointly purchased by ELAPP and the Florida Communities Trust (FCT).

== Facilities ==
The park has no structures or facilities other than a parking lot and one portable bathroom stall. Additional parking is available on the wide shoulders of Balm-Boyette Road.

== Mountain biking ==
The preserve has become a destination mountain biking trip, with over 25 miles of trails, mostly singletrack. The trails provide a wide mix of difficulties from beginner to expert.
