= Environmentally Endangered Lands Programs =

Bond funded wildland conservation efforts in Florida

Environmentally Endangered Lands Programs are property tax and bond funded wildland conservation efforts in Florida, USA.

The programs in more than 27 Florida counties include:

- Environmental Lands Acquisition and Protection Program (ELAPP), Hillsborough County
- Environmentally Endangered Lands protection program, Brevard County
- Environmentally Sensitive Lands Protection Program (ESLPP), Sarasota County
- Environmentally Endangered Lands (EEL) Miami-Dade County
- Environmentally Sensitive Lands, Hernando County's program
- Land Preservation Bond Program, Broward County
- Palm Beach County land acquisition program
- St. Johns County has a willing-seller Land Acquisition and Management Program
- Santa Rosa County added natural area protection to its half-cent surtax program in 2026

Florida Forever is a statewide program.

== History ==
Miami-Dade County voters approved a tax for Environmentally Endangered Lands in 1990 and $40 million more $40 million in 2004 through the Building Better Communities Bond.

Broward County approved its Land Preservation Bond Program in 2000 and purchased 83 sites for a totalof 850 acres as of 2007, using $152 million of its $200 million.

Palm Beach County started its land acquisition program in 1991 with a $100 million bond. Through 2006 the country had protected 35,063 acres. A volunteer program helps with restoration and maintenance.

In 1987, voters in Hillsborough County, Florida, overwhelmingly chose to increase taxes and create the Environmental Lands Acquisition and Protection Program (ELAPP). Through this program, environmentally sensitive areas were preserved and/or restored. Again in 1990 and 2008, voters opted to increase taxes in order to expand ELAPP.

On November 6, 2008 Florida voted for an amendment to the Florida Constitution requiring the state legislature to exempt land permanently set aside for conservation from all property taxes beginning in 2010.

== Evergreen forest ==
Twenty-seven endangered and threatened plants live in the evergreen forests called hammocks. Several species originated in the West Indies including Ficus, gumbo-limbo, lancewood and paradise-trees. Temperate live oak grows in the forests. Hattie Bauer Hammock is one preserve with this type of habitat and was acquired in 1996. Vines are a problem outcompeting the native goatsfoot (Passiflora sexflora). The threatened broad halberd fern (Tectaria heracleifolia) and maidenhair ferns. Cuban nakedwood, Colubrina cubensis var. floridana is highly endangered. Colubrina. It is also known as Cuban snakebark.

== Southern glade ==
Plants protected in Southern glades include wildflowers like Samolus parviflorus (water pimpernel), yellowtop, lavender thistle, marsh pinks, and grass pink orchids (Calapogon tuberosus). Bird inhabitants include double-crested cormorants, great blue heron, little blue heron, tricolored heron, snowy egret, osprey, kingfisher and grebe. Native poisonwood grows in these areas. Other species include white-crowned pigeon, Spike rush, sawgrass, crayfish, marsh rabbit, deer and Florida panther; as well as colicroot (Aletris bracteata), the lavender ground orchid Bletia purpurea and Pinguicula pumila, a dwarf butterwort.

== Scrub ==
Florida's oldest ecosystem is scrub. One area is of it protected in a fenced 15-acre plot called County Line Scrub on the Dade County/ Broward County border boundary and at the four acre Dolphin Center Park Addition. Inhabitants include live oak, Chapman's oak, myrtle oak and a natural hybrid known as Rolf's oak. Winged sumac, which provides red fruit for small warblers and other wildlife in the fall, pawpaws (Asimina), Saw palmettos, cocoplum, wax myrtle, tarflower (Befaria racemosa) as well as the endangered quailberry (Crossopetalum ilicifolium). Blueberry and rusty lyonia. Animals such as gopher tortoise, scrub lizard, burrowing owl and indigo snake. Even smaller parcels can host coontie, sabal palm, partridge pea and a native cactus: Opuntia humifusa. These can be seen at Arch Creek or Greynolds Park.

== Pine Rockland ==
Pine rockland is a rare ecosystem, with only about 4,000 acres of the original 185,000 acres, remaining. This type of habitat developed around limestone and fire. Swallow-tailed kite, osprey. Rockdale Pineland is one preserve, home to endangered Redland sandmat (deltoid spurge). The land conservation programs have protected an additional 850 acres. locustberry saw palmetto, coontie, a native cycad used by pioneers to make starch, wild poinsettia and lantana. Prickly pear (Opuntia humifusa).
