= Port Tampa (neighborhood) =

- Neighborhood
- Location within the state of Florida
- Coordinates: 27°52′N 82°32′W
- Country: United States
- State: Florida
- County: Hillsborough
- City: Tampa
- Time zone: UTC-5 (Eastern (EST))
  - Summer (DST): UTC-4 (EDT)

Port Tampa is a neighborhood in the southwestern most portion within the city limits of Tampa, Florida, on the western end of the Interbay Peninsula where the main port used to be. Within this neighborhood is Picnic Island Park as well as West Shore Elementary school.

It is sometimes confused with Port Tampa Bay (formerly the Port of Tampa), Tampa's larger port area near downtown on the northern end of Hillsborough Bay. As most of it being a historical district, it used to be an impoverished neighborhood with ghettos, projects, trailer parks & section-8 homes, the city has been gentrifying in the recent years. Also known as PT, PTC, or Port Tampa City.

== History ==
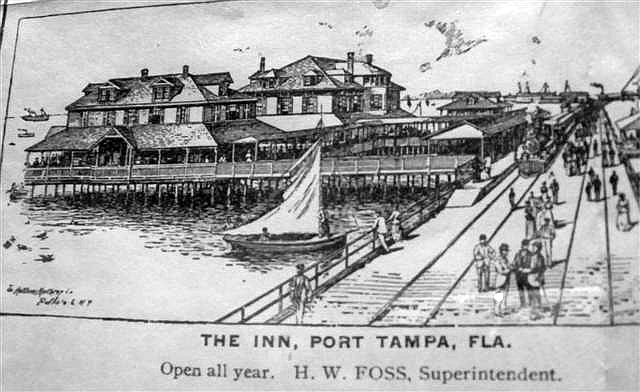
Henry Plant's Port Tampa Inn. Note rail line in front of hotel

The town of Port Tampa City was established in 1885 at the end of Henry B. Plant's railroad line. The shallow draft of Tampa Bay made Tampa's main port inaccessible for the larger ships of the day, so Plant built a new port several miles away. To help bring visitors and residents to this new development, Plant built the St. Elmo Inn and Port Tampa Inn at the end of his rail line. The Port Tampa Inn was larger and had the distinction of being constructed directly on the bay on stilts.

Port Tampa was the primary port of embarkation for the Spanish–American War in Cuba. In June 1898 Port Tampa and the city of Tampa hosted more than 33,000 visitors including military officers, enlisted men, nurses, civilian clerks, teamsters, packers, stevedores, war correspondents, tourists, and a host of foreign military observers. Wartime notables who passed through Port Tampa included Teddy Roosevelt and the Rough Riders, the Buffalo Soldiers, Clara Barton of the American Red Cross, Richard Harding Davis, Stephen Crane, and Frederic Remington.

Port Tampa became less important when several dredging projects made the Port of Tampa accessible to all shipping. The port is still in use, however, and is the main entry point for fuel for both Tampa International Airport and MacDill Air Force Base.

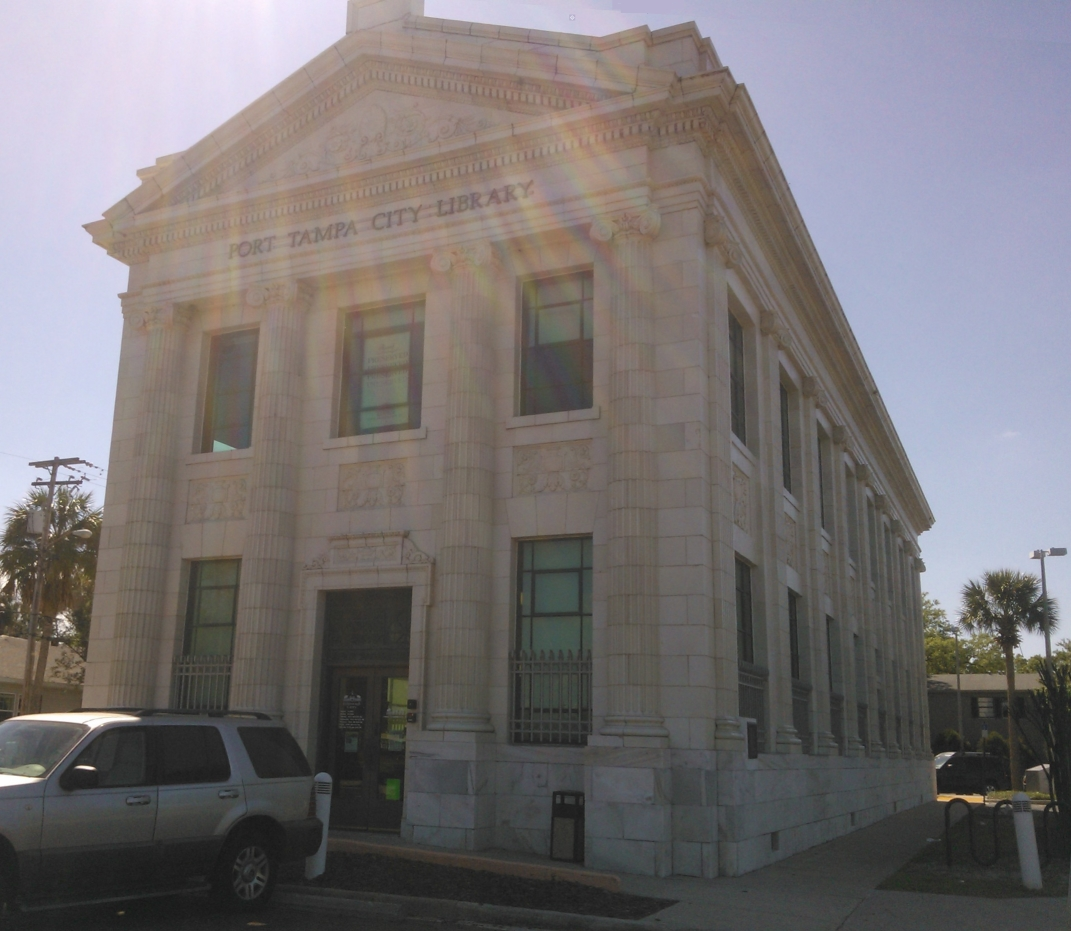
Port Tampa City Library

Though the city of Port Tampa was annexed by the City of Tampa in 1961, community members still recognize the neighborhood's heritage. A centennial celebration was held in 1993, complete with home tours, and a large block party in the Spanish–American War Memorial Park at the corner of Interbay Blvd. and Westshore Blvd.

A large neoclassical style building with marble base and glazed terracotta tile above, formerly used as a bank, was saved from demolition through a community effort spearheaded by the Port Tampa City Woman's Club and the Civic Association of Port Tampa. The Port Tampa City Women's Club had run the library from 1951–1961. The renovated building, the former Commerce Bank Building, was converted into the Port Tampa City Library in 1998. Its second floor houses Tampa's Maritime Reading Room, with its artifacts, books and coastal maps. The library is now run by the county.

== Boundaries ==
The official boundaries of the city of Port Tampa were lands west of Manhattan Avenue to Tampa Bay and everything south of the old east-west railroad track north of McCoy St. Locals sometimes refer to it as anything "south of Gandy" although this is not exactly true, as there are several other distinct neighborhoods across the Tampa peninsula besides Port Tampa.

== Claims to fame ==
Port Tampa is one of only two communities directly founded by Henry Plant's investment company; the other, Belleair in Pinellas County near Clearwater, was founded in 1896 surrounding Plant's Belleview Hotel.

Future President Theodore Roosevelt stayed at a Port Tampa home during his final days in Tampa before embarking with his Rough Riders to Cuba during the 1898 Spanish-American war.

Tommy Gomez was a heavyweight boxer from Port Tampa City. He fought several well-known heavyweights like Ezzard Charles and Jersey Joe Walcott in venues such as Madison Square Garden in New York City.

Hulk Hogan grew up in Port Tampa and attended Robinson High School when he was still known as Terry Bollea.

Javier Arenas graduated from Robinson High School. He was a cornerback with the Arizona Cardinals of the National Football League.
