= Lillibridge =

Lillibridge may refer to:

== People ==
- Brent Lillibridge (born 1983), American professional baseball player
- C. C. Lillibridge (1894–1965), American politician and dentist from Nebraska
- Gary Lillibridge (born 1956), American Episcopal bishop
- John Lillibridge (1878–?), American businessman and college football coach

== Places ==
- Lillibridge, Florida, unincorporated community in Hillsborough County, Florida
- Hampton Lillibridge House, in Savannah, Georgia
- Simon Lillibridge Farm, in Exeter, Rhode Island
