= Blackwater Creek =

Blackwater Creek may refer to various riverine features including:

in Australia

- Blackwater Creek (New South Wales)

in the United States of America

- Blackwater Creek (Lake County, Florida)
- Blackwater Creek (Hillsborough County, Florida)
