= Blackwater Creek Preserve =

Nature preserve, United States of America

- Location within Florida
- Location: Hillsborough County, Florida
- Nearest city: Plant City
- Coordinates: 28.133°N 82.165°W
- Area: 1,993 acres (807 ha)
- Established: 1997
- Governing body: Hillsborough County

Blackwater Creek Nature Preserve is a 1,993-acre (807 ha) area of conservation land in northeast Hillsborough County, Florida near Plant City. Hikers can enjoy 6 miles of sunny, grassy hiking trails winding through the open pine flatwoods to an overlook on Blackwater Creek.

== Facilities ==
This land is kept in a primitive state for the benefit of the native plants and wildlife. There is no running water and no restroom available at the preserve. The parking lot, located at the end of Patrinostro Rd. in Plant City, has a kiosk with trail information and two picnic tables for visitors to enjoy. Bicyclists are not permitted and there is no camping or hunting allowed on the preserve. The preserve is open from sunrise to sunset seven days a week.

== History ==
The preserve was purchased in sections, beginning in 1997, with funds from the Jan K. Platt Environmental Lands Acquisition and Protection Program and the Florida Communities Trust. The land was previously used for low-impact cattle grazing and silviculture. The preserve was purchased to protect the watershed of Blackwater Creek, provide habitat for native plants and animals, and provide recreational opportunities for the surrounding community. Staff maintain trails and the parking area, perform prescribed fire to benefit native plants and wildlife, monitor wildlife, and remove invasive plants such as cogon grass and chinese tallow tree.

== Flora and fauna ==
The preserve's natural communities include pine savannah, pine flatwoods, cypress domes, and riverine habitat along Blackwater Creek and a second unnamed creek that also runs through the property. Wildlife in the area include white-tailed deer, turkey, southern fox squirrels, gopher tortoises, dusky pigmy rattlesnakes, and Eastern bluebirds.
