= Port Sutton, Florida =

Unincorporated community in Florida, US

- Unincorporated community
- Location within Florida Location within the United States
- Coordinates: 27°54′25″N 82°25′15″W
- Country: United States
- State: Florida
- County: Hillsborough
- Time zone: UTC-5 (Eastern (EST))
  - Summer (DST): UTC-4 (EDT)
- ZIP code: 33619
- Area code: 813
- GNIS feature ID: 295811

Port Sutton is an unincorporated community located in the industrial section of southeastern Hillsborough County, Florida, United States.

The community of Port Sutton is served by Hillsborough County Schools, which serves the entire county.
