= Rattlesnake (Tampa) =

- Neighborhood
- Location within the state of Florida
- Coordinates: 27°53′20″N 82°31′26″W
- Country: United States
- State: Florida
- County: Hillsborough
- City: Tampa
- Time zone: UTC-5 (Eastern (EST))
  - Summer (DST): UTC-4 (EDT)
- ZIP code: 33611
- Area codes: 813, 656

Rattlesnake is a neighborhood and former unincorporated community located in the South Tampa district of Tampa, Florida.

== History ==
Rattlesnake was founded in the 1930s by George K. End of Arcadia, who opened a cannery for rattlesnake meat (which billed itself at the "World's only Rattlesnake Cannery") on the intersection of Gandy Boulevard and Bridge Street. The community came to have a post office, a general store, a filling station and a restaurant, as well as a snake pit attraction for visitors. End later died after being bitten by one of his own rattlesnakes. In the 1950s the area was annexed by the city of Tampa.

== Geography ==
There are no official boundaries for Rattlesnake. Zillow.com defines it as being bounded on the north by Gandy Boulevard, on the east by the South Florida Railroad tracks east of Lois Avenue, on the south by Tyson Avenue and the railroad tracks running parallel to it, and on the west by Old Tampa Bay.

Rattlesnake is located at latitude 27.889 north and longitude 82.524 west. The elevation is 3 feet above sea level.

== Demographics ==
The median income for the neighborhood is $37,948, which is above the citywide average.

The population age distribution is 22.2% under the age of 20, 43.5% from 20 to 39, 23.3% from 40 to 59, and 11% who were 60 years of age or older.

== Education ==
Rattlesnake is served by Hillsborough County Public Schools, which serves the city of Tampa and Hillsborough County.

== See also ==
- South Tampa
- Neighborhoods in Tampa, Florida
