= Environmentally Sensitive Lands =

Environmentally Sensitive Lands (ESL) is a land conservation program in Hernando County, Florida funded by a bond measure approved by voters November 8, 1988. The program is set up to run for 30 years and seeks "To build an East-West corridor across the county linking large conservation tracts of the Withlacoochee State Forest" and "develop a North-South Coastal Corridor that will continue into Citrus County and south into northern Pasco County."

== See also ==
- Environmentally Endangered Lands Programs
