= Gulf City, Florida =

- Unincorporated community
- Location within Florida Location within the United States
- Coordinates: 27°42′20″N 82°27′43″W
- Country: United States
- State: Florida
- County: Hillsborough
- Time zone: UTC-5 (Eastern (EST))
  - Summer (DST): UTC-4 (EDT)
- Area code: 813
- GNIS feature ID: 283487

Gulf City is an unincorporated community in Hillsborough County, Florida, United States, near Ruskin. It is 24 miles (39 km) south of Tampa by road, on the south bank of the Little Manatee River.

== History ==
Gulf City was founded by British pirate Ben Margoza in the mid-17th century. It went into decline in the 19th century. In 1895, it was listed as having a population of 76 people, and a post office. The town site is now the location of several housing developments.
