= International Mountain Bicycling Association =

Non-profit organization in the USA

IMBA logo

The International Mountain Bicycling Association (IMBA) is a non-profit educational association that aims to create and preserve trails for mountain bikers worldwide. The IMBA promotes mountain biking, trail building, and trail maintenance. The IMBA has developed a set of principles known as the "Rules of the Trail", which promote responsibility on shared-use and single track trails.

== History ==
The IMBA was formed in 1988 by the Concerned Off Road Bicyclists Association, Bicycle Trails Council of the East Bay, Bicycle Trails Council of Marin, Sacramento Rough Riders and Responsible Organized Mountain Pedalers. Gibson Anderson of Sacramento was the IMBA's first elected executive director.

In 1993, IMBA hired Tim Blumenthal, a former IMBA board member and cycling journalist, to serve as their second executive director. When Blumenthal began, the organization had roughly 1,200 individual members and about 60 affiliated clubs. The headquarters moved to Boulder, Colorado, in 1994.

In 1997, an international summit was held in Switzerland. It held educational outreach programs, such as the Trail Care Crews, which was sponsored by Subaru Corporation. At the end of 1999, IMBA had more than 28,000 individual members, 14 staffers and a budget of $1.2 million.

In 2006, IMBA's membership grew to 32,000 members, with a staff of 26 and more than 600 affiliated clubs.

== Affiliated organizations ==
- Cincinnati Off-Road Alliance
- Jersey Off Road Bicycle Association
- Minnesota Off-Road Cyclists
- Northwest Trail Alliance (formerly Portland United Mountain Pedalers)
- Southern Off-Road Bicycle Association
- SouthWest Association of Mountain Bike Pedalers (SWAMP)
- Valley Mountain Bikers

== Ride Center ==
IMBA has created a "Ride Center" designation where sites that feature "extensive trail networks" are recognized and rated. IMBA staff select candidates for "Ride Center" recognition on an invitation-only basis. As of December 2013, the following is a list of IMBA Ride Centers:

- Park City, Utah (Gold)
- Bike Taupo, Taupō, New Zealand (Silver)
- Oakridge Area, Oregon (Silver)
- Sun Valley, Idaho (Silver)
- Copper Harbor, Michigan (Silver)
- Central Savannah River Area/Forks Area Trail System (FATS) (Bronze)
- Hot Springs, Arkansas (Bronze)
- Cuyuna Lakes, Minnesota (Bronze)
- Harrisonburg, Virginia (Bronze)
- Helena, Montana (Bronze)
- Mt. Buller, Victoria, Australia (Bronze)
- Santos, Florida (Bronze)
- Singltrek pod Smrkem, Czech Republic/Poland (Bronze)
- Snowshoe Highlands, West Virginia (Bronze)
- Redlands, California (Bronze)

On July 9, 2013, Virginia Governor Bob McDonnell announced that a Richmond Region Ride Center would open in 2014 in the Richmond, Virginia metro region, as the first legacy project of the Richmond 2015 bike race.

World summit

Each year, IMBA has a bike races worldwide. Some locations have included Steamboat Springs (2014) and Bentonville, Arkansas (2016).

== See also ==
- Mountain Biking
- Single track (mountain biking)

== International representation and affiliate ==
IMBA España:

IMBA Argentina

IMBA Canada

IMBA Italy

IMBA Europe

IMBA Schweiz
