= SouthWest Association of Mountain Bike Pedalers =

Cycling club in Florida, United States

The SouthWest Association of Mountain Bike Pedalers (SWAMP) club is an association of mountain bikers that creates, and maintains mountain biking trails in Florida. The organization has built and maintains trails in several parks, including Alafia River State Park, Balm-Boyette Scrub Nature Preserve, Croom Trail, Santos Trail and the Jay B. Starkey Wilderness Park Trail in Pasco County. Many of the trails are built on the remains of abandoned phosphate mines, which allows for a great variation in difficulty from easy to extremely advanced.

SWAMP maintains over 100 miles of trails within 70 miles of Tampa, and sponsors events including the Alafia River Epic and the Alafia Fat Tire Festival.

== History ==
The club was founded in 1992 by Wes Eubank. Since that time, the club has grown to several hundred members in size and sponsors educational as well as recreational rides. In addition to raising and spending approximately $20,000 per year on trail building and maintenance, the group helps in other efforts, such as the removal of invasive species in parks.

== Organization ==
The club belongs to both the International Mountain Biking Association and Southern Off-Road Bicycle Association (SORBA). The club is overseen by a 25-member advisory board. The current president is Ron Zajac.
