= Wolf Branch Nature Preserve =

Nature preserve in Florida, US

- Location within Florida Location within the United States
- Location: 481 Villemaire Road Apollo Beach (Hillsborough County), Florida, United States
- Nearest city: Tampa, Florida
- Coordinates: 27°44′45.6″N 82°26′31″W
- Area: 1,400 acres (5.7 km^{2})
- Established: 1990
- Website: www.hillsboroughcounty.org/en/locations/wolf-branch-creek-nature-preserve

Wolf Branch Nature Preserve is a 1,400-acre (570 ha) nature preserve in Hillsborough County, Florida. The preserve is managed by Hillsborough County's Conservation and Environmental Lands Management Department. It offers fishing and 2 miles (3.2 km) of hiking trails in areas of natural mangrove shoreline, upland cabbage palm hammocks, offshore sea grass beds in Tampa Bay, and tidally-influenced Wolf Branch Creek.

High tides reverse the course of the creek and move juvenile mullet, snook and reds. Roseate spoonbills, reddish egrets, wood storks, and at least one bobcat call the preserve home.

The distressed area was purchased by the county in 1993 for $1.8 million. Historically it was used for pasture and cropland. Restoration projects took place on the property starting with eradicating exotic vegetation, then sculpting both isolated and interconnected wetlands to attract fisheries and other wildlife.
