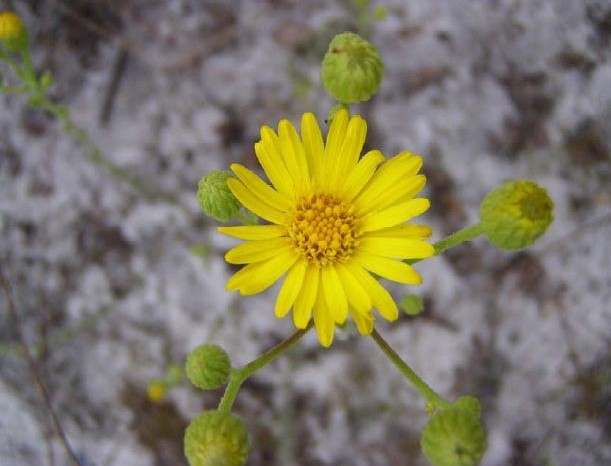

Conservation status
- Vulnerable (NatureServe)

Scientific classification
- Kingdom: Plantae
- Clade: Tracheophytes
- Clade: Angiosperms
- Clade: Eudicots
- Clade: Asterids
- Order: Asterales
- Family: Asteraceae
- Genus: Chrysopsis
- Species: C. floridana

Binomial name
- Chrysopsis floridana Small

Synonyms
- Chrysopsis mariana var. floridana (Small) Fernald; Heterotheca floridana (Small) R.W.Long; Heterotheca mariana subsp. floridana (Small) V.L.Harms

= Chrysopsis floridana =

Species of plant

Chrysopsis floridana is a rare species of flowering plant in the family Asteraceae, known by its common name, Florida golden aster. It is endemic to Florida in the United States, where it is known from Hillsborough, Hardee, Manatee, and Pinellas Counties. It is considered an endemic of the west-central coast of the state in the general vicinity of Tampa Bay. There are 17 to 20 occurrences, many of which have few individuals, but one of which has over one million plants. In 1986 the plant was added to the US endangered species list because it was becoming increasingly rare, it was growing only on private property, and its habitat was unprotected and being destroyed and degraded by a number of forces. It is found at Bell Creek Nature Preserve in Riverview, Florida.

== Characteristics ==
This is a short-lived perennial herb or subshrub growing 30 to 70 centimeters tall from a fibrous or rhizomatous root system. The erect, woolly-haired stem has densely hairy, glandular leaves, the lowest ones measuring up to about 10 centimeters in length. The top of the plant is occupied by a branching inflorescence of variable size, bearing 1 to 25 or more flower heads. The head has many yellow ray florets each measuring less than one centimeter long. Blooming occurs in November and December. The fruit is an achene two millimeters long tipped with a tiny pappus of bristles. These fruits are dispersed on the wind.

== Habitat ==
This plant occurs in open areas in Florida scrub habitat among sand pines (Pinus clausa). It can also be found in the ecotone between the scrub and adjacent habitat types. The substrate is the white siliceous sand that was once part of an ancient dune system. This sand is low in organic nutrients and retains little water.

== Endangered status ==
When the species was listed endangered it faced a number of threats.

=== Human population ===
It only occurred in or near dense human population centers. The main threat was habitat destruction for residential and commercial development, land management efforts such as mowing, railroad maintenance, and dumping. The land was affected by off-road vehicles, and the grazing of livestock; while the plant can tolerate and even thrive with a moderate amount of disturbance in its habitat, the heavy vehicle and grazing activity were too degrading to the land, leading to erosion and other negative effects. The only known populations were on private property with no guarantee of protection, and at least two were in the middle of rapidly growing subdivisions.

=== Competitors ===
The plant is a poor competitor with vigorous species such as saw palmetto (Serenoa repens) and introduced and invasive species such as Natal grass (Melinis repens), and Bahia grass (Paspalum notatum). The plant also does not tolerate shade, so, when tall or woody vegetation grows up around it, it often cannot survive. The natural fire regime of the Florida scrub features periodic wildfire that sweeps through and clears overgrown vegetation, allowing shade-intolerant plants of the understory to thrive. Many of these fires are started by summer lightning. This species has been shown to flower more profusely when its habitat has been recently burned, so natural or controlled burns are part of the recovery plan.

== Recovery process ==
The recovery plan set in place for the rare plant was adequate and effective, and has shown some good results. Some of the land where the plant occurs was acquired for the purpose of conservation. The owners of other sections of land have agreed to fence sensitive habitat and otherwise protect the plant. Controlled burns are now performed in many areas. Previously unknown populations have been discovered. Seedlings have been planted in several protected areas with appropriate habitat, a strategy that included the reintroduction of populations to areas where the plant had been extirpated.

The plant still faces the threat of habitat destruction in much of its range, but much less than in the 1980s: habitat loss to development is not a "major" concern now. The main recovery objective has been met; the species now meets criteria for downlisting. In 2009, the Fish and Wildlife Service recommended the species be downlisted from endangered to threatened status.
