= Upper Tampa Bay Park =

Archaeological site in Florida, United States

- Upper Tampa Bay Archeological District
- U.S. National Register of Historic Places
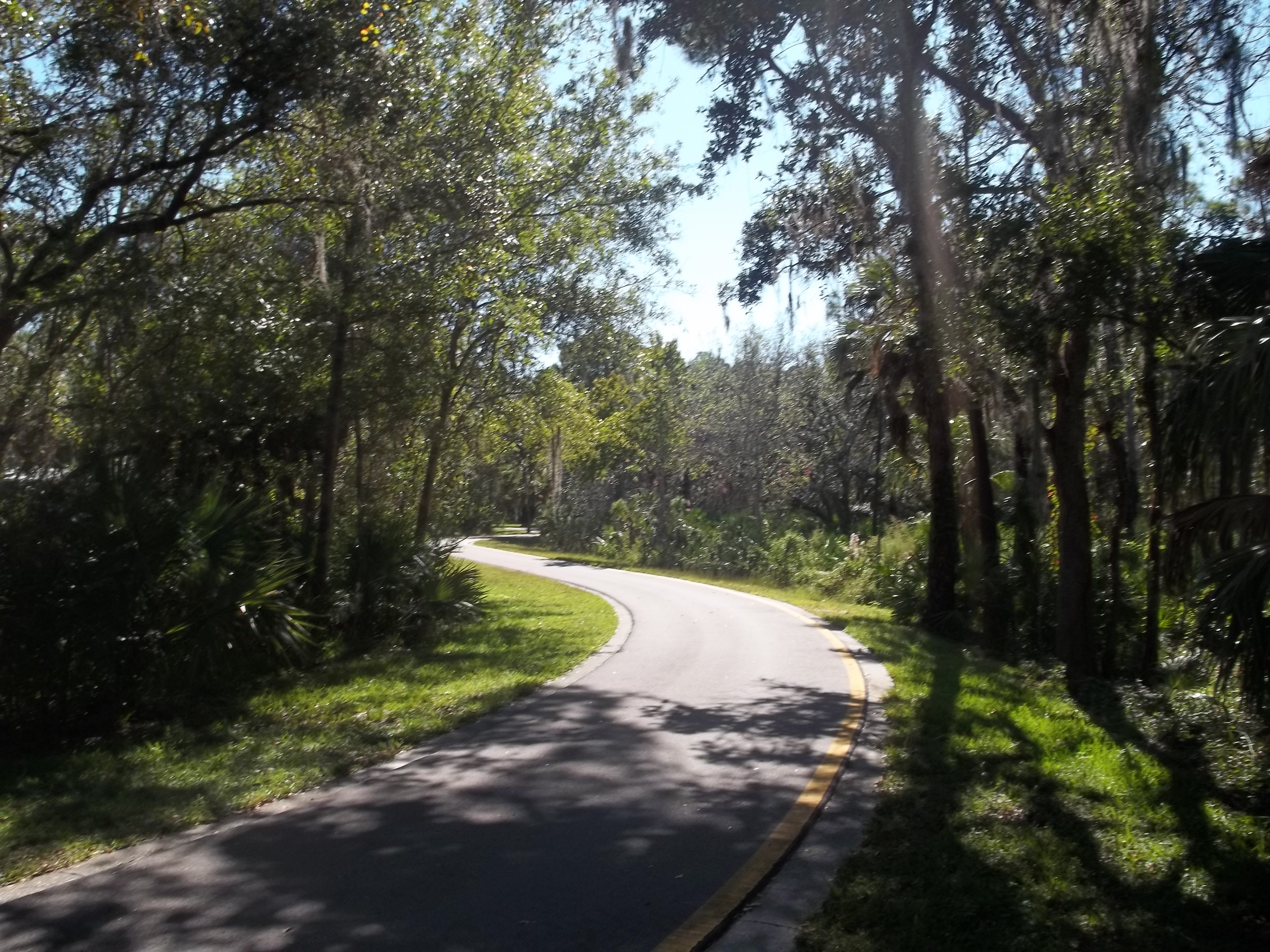

- Location within Florida Location within the United States
- Location: 8001 Double Branch Road, Tampa, FL 33635 Hillsborough County, Florida, United States
- Nearest city: Tampa, Florida
- Coordinates: 28°00′48″N 82°38′05″W
- Area: 596 acres (2.41 km^{2})
- Website: www.hillsboroughcounty.org/en/locations/upper-tampa-bay-park
- NRHP reference No.: 85003330
- Added to NRHP: 1982

The Upper Tampa Bay Park is a Hillsborough County park located on the Double Branch Peninsula, approximately three miles southeast of Oldsmar, which is west of Tampa. The park has been only minimally developed because the environment is so fragile and sensitive.

Within the park is the Upper Tampa Bay Archeological District, which was added to the US National Register of Historic Places on December 10, 1985. The area was once inhabited by Tocobaga Indians (from approximately 900 A.D. until the 1500s), and they left mounds of shellfish.

The park protects mangrove forests, saltwater and freshwater marshes, coastal hammocks, and pine flatwoods.

The area is inhabited by redfish, snook, dolphins, manatees, and otters, and includes the Double Branch Creek. There are observation decks, picnic shelters, a playground, a nature center, and walking trails. Canoe and kayak rentals are offered.
