= Blackwater Creek (Hillsborough County, Florida) =

River in Florida, United States

Coordinates: 28.150804°N 82.215379°W

Location
- Country: United States
- State: Florida

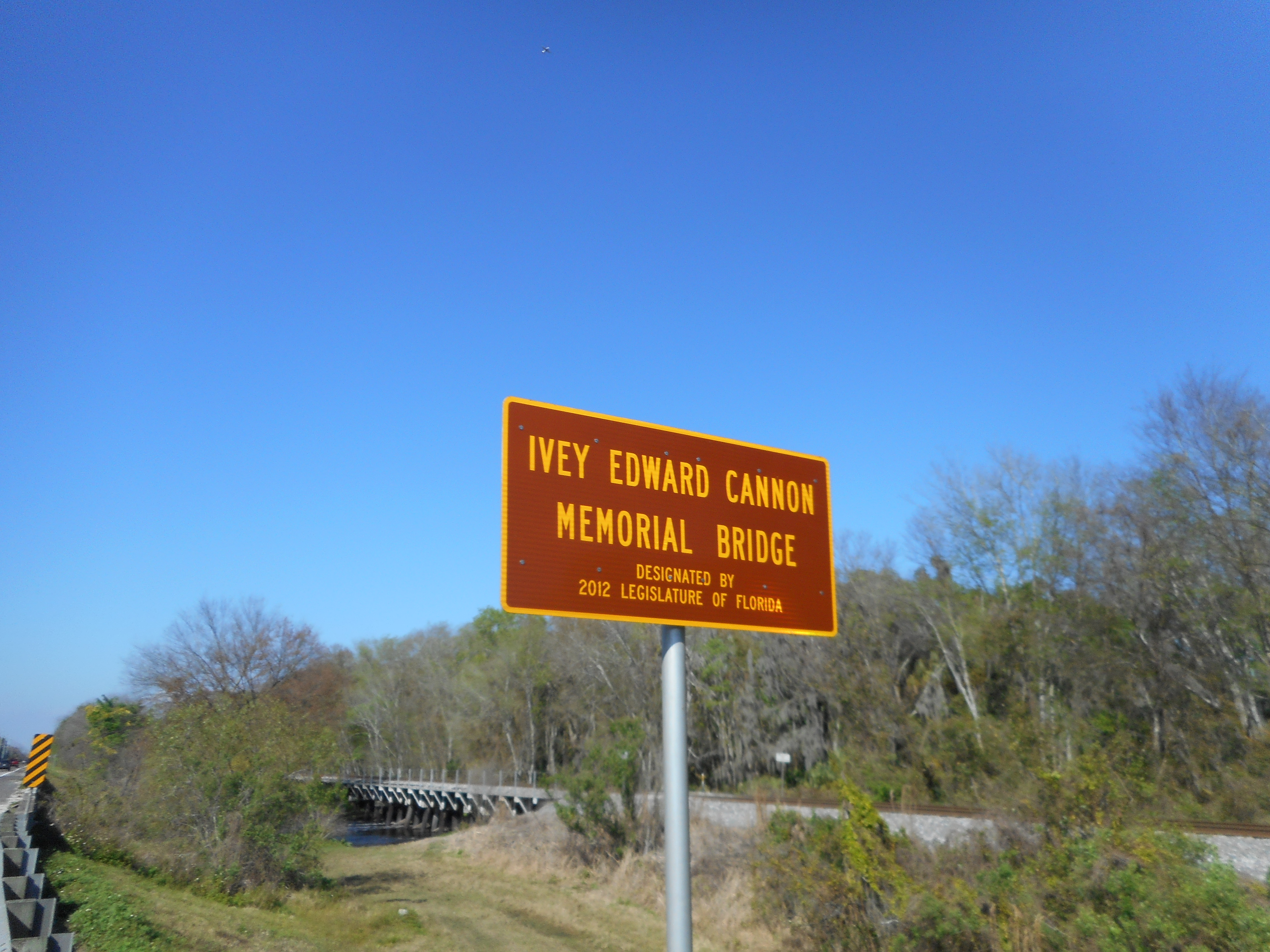
The Ivey Edward Cannon Memorial Bridge carries FL 39 next to the CSX Yeoman Subdivision over the creek.

Blackwater Creek travels through part of Hillsborough County, Florida. It is a tributary of the Hillsborough River.

The Blackwater Creek Preserve, a 1,200 acre conservation area, protects a section of it in this area. The preserve includes trails.
