= Bell Creek Nature Preserve =

Nature preserve, United States of America

- Location within Florida
- Interactive map of Bell Creek Nature Preserve
- Location: Tampa, Florida
- Coordinates: 27.844°N 82.290°W
- Operator: Hillsborough County's Conservation and Environmental Lands Management Department
- Website: https://www.hillsboroughcounty.org/en/locations/bell-creek-preserve

Bell Creek Nature Preserve is a 477-acre (193 ha) nature preserve located at 10940 McMullen Road in Riverview, Florida, United States. The preserve property was purchased using funds from the Jan K. Platt Environmental Lands Acquisition and Protection Program and the Florida Communities Trust and is managed by Hillsborough County's Conservation and Environmental Lands Management Department. Bell Creek Nature Preserve comprises many habitat types including sand pine scrub, pine flatwoods, freshwater marsh, oak hammock, and restored pasture. The preserve is home to the endangered Florida golden aster (Chrysopsis floridana), Eastern indigo snake (Drymarchon couperi), and wood stork (Mycteria americana) along with other threatened and endangered plants and animals.

Bell Creek Nature Preserve features five miles of marked hiking trails, a pond for fishing and wildlife viewing, and an administrative office (open weekdays) where visitors may purchase a Hillsborough County Annual Conservation Park or Boat Ramp Pass.

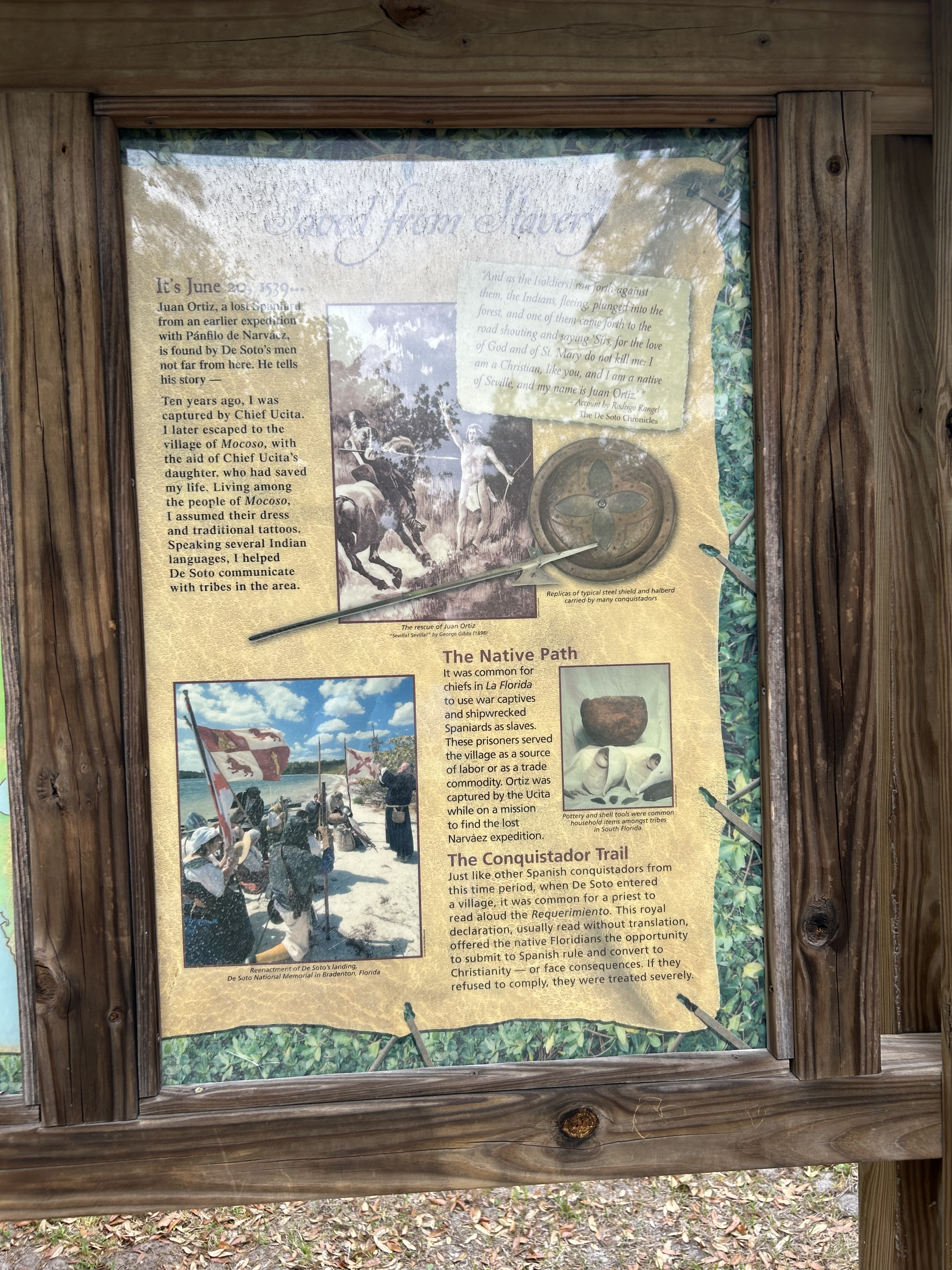
Historical Marker of De Soto Trail in Bell Creek Preserve

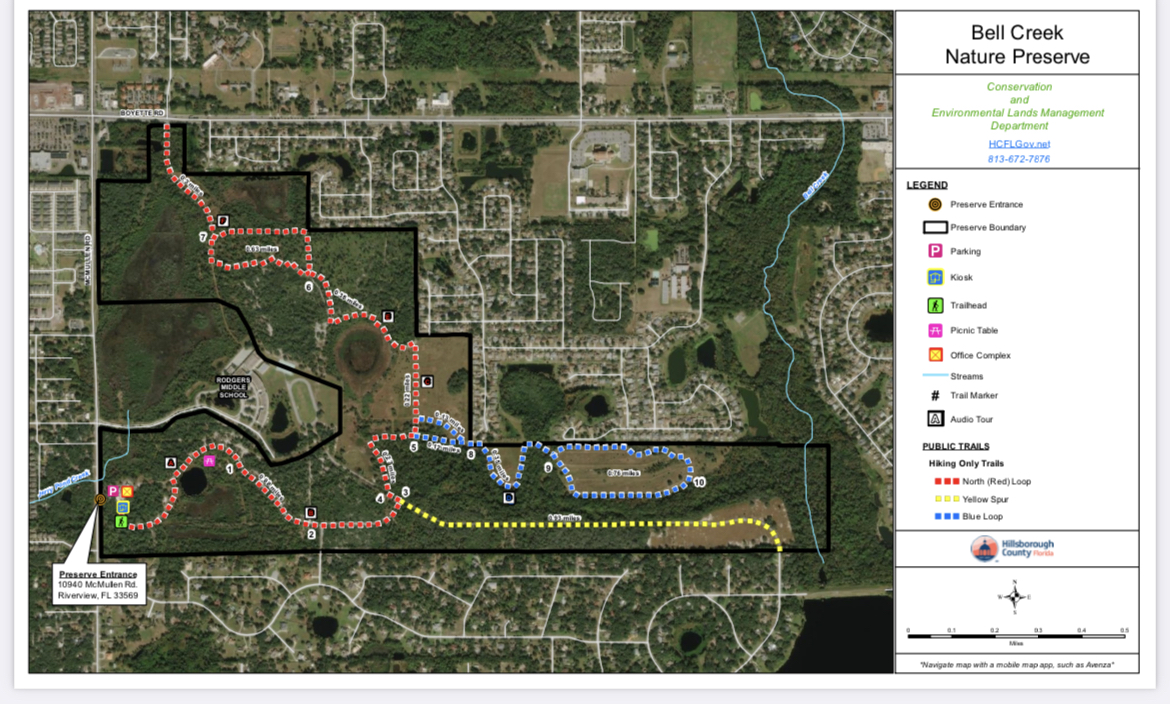
Trail map for the nature preserve

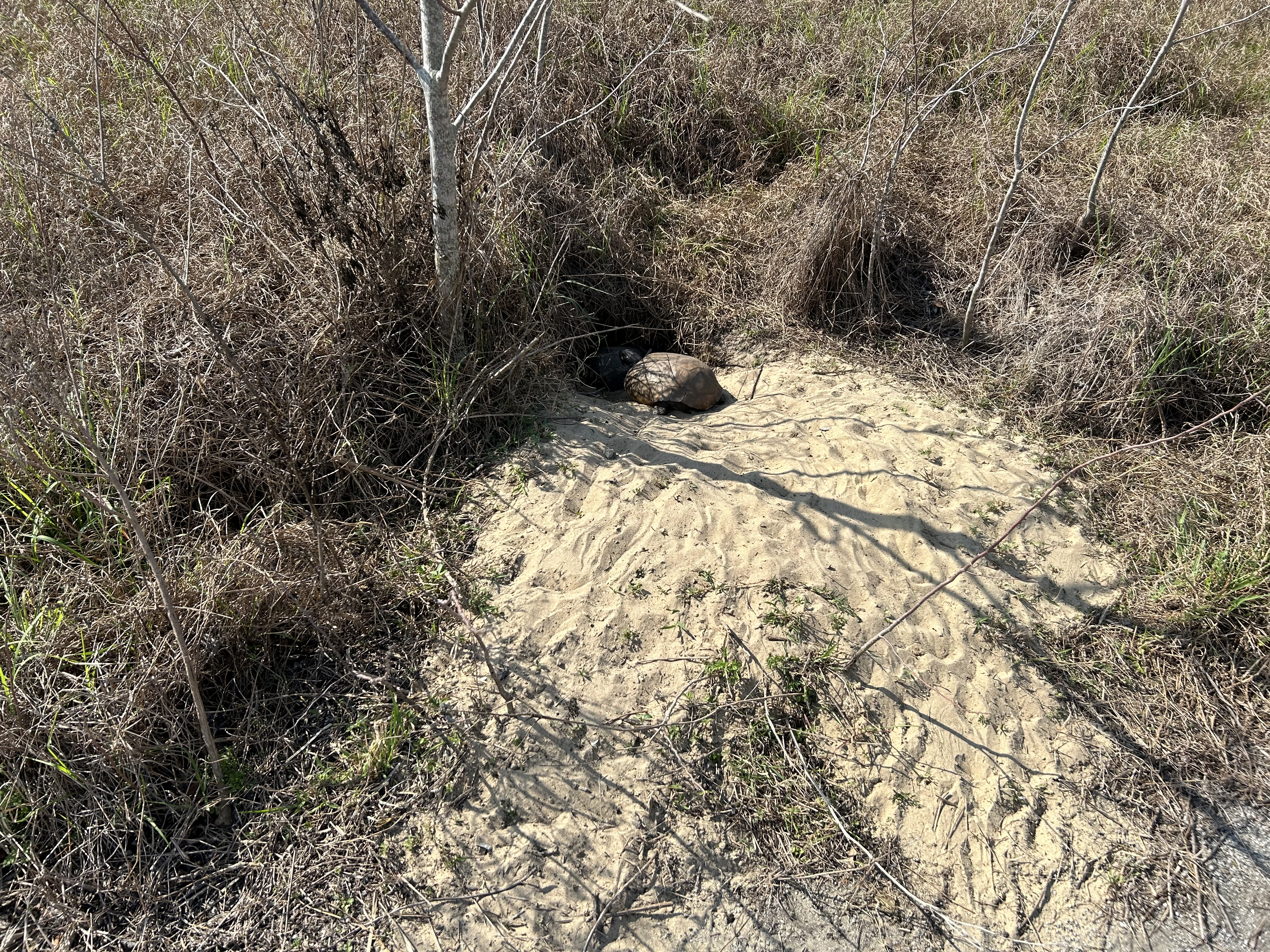
Gopher tortoise at its burrow

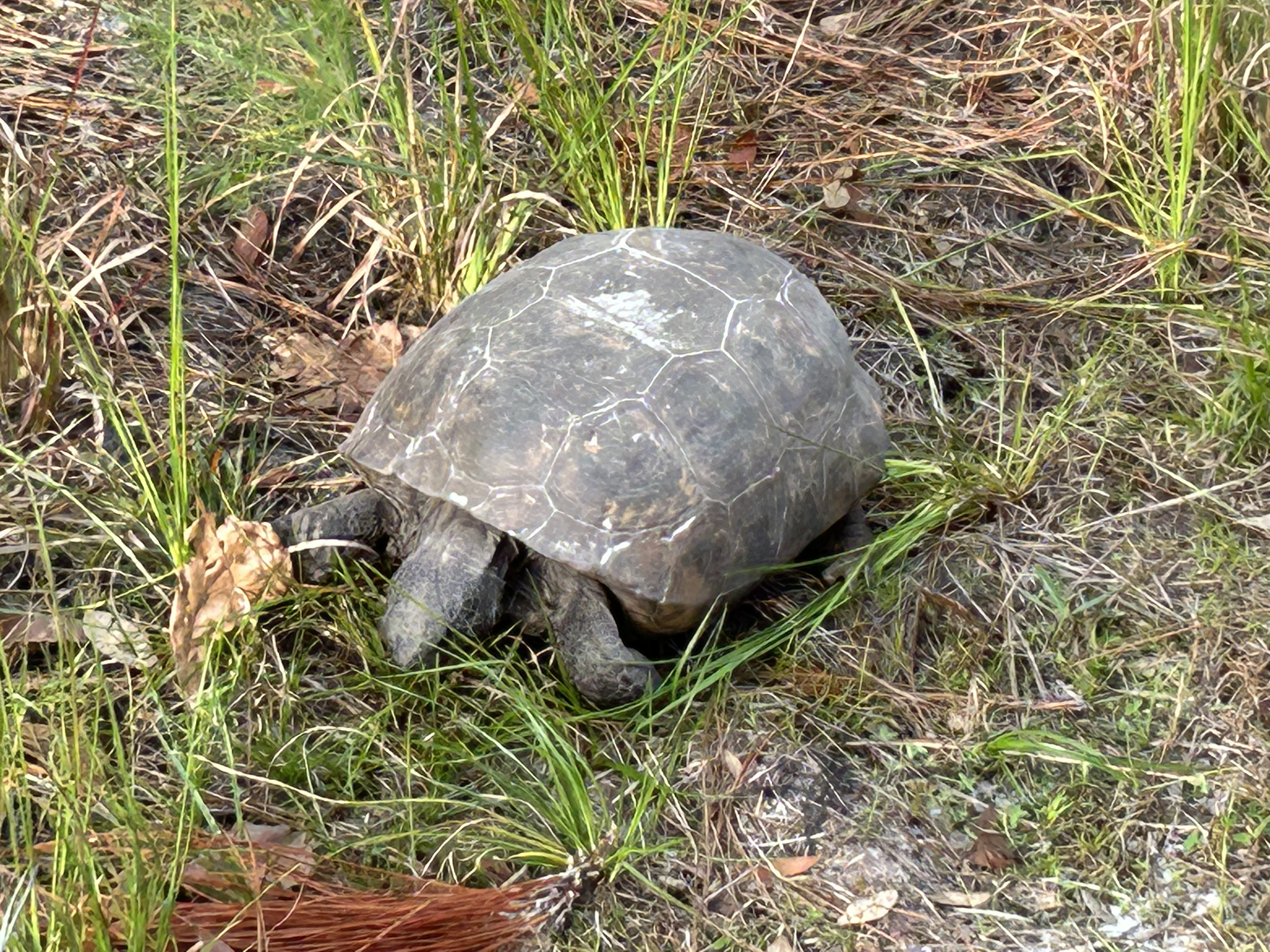
A tortoise eating plant life in Bell Creek Preserve
