= Roger L. Hammer =

Florida-based botanist

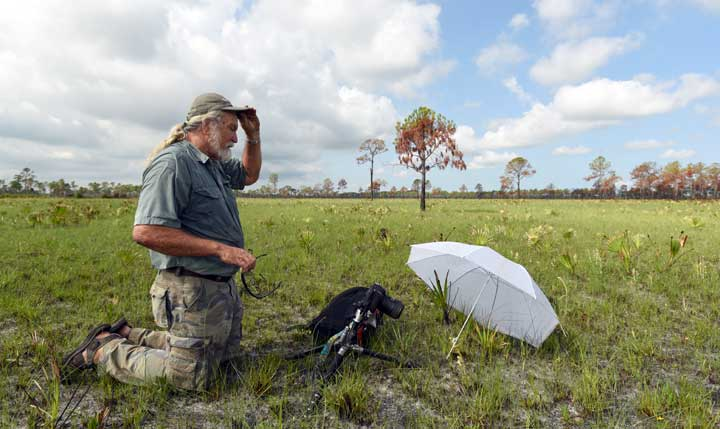
Roger L. Hammer photographing the federally endangered endemic plant: Asimina pulchella

Roger L. Hammer is a naturalist, botanist, photographer, author, and speaker in Florida. He has written several guides to wildflowers and leads wildflower walks. He met Marjory Stoneman Douglas when he received the Marjory Stoneman Douglas Award.

Hammer has been involved in conservation efforts in the Miami area. He opposed a massive expansion of an airstrip that had been limited in size back in the 1960s when Miami's mayor launched planned for a Paris Air Show type event at the facility. He discussed the importance of fire in Miami area's pine rockland in a BBC Mundo piece featuring his photos. The Miami Herald referred to him as "a leading authority on South Florida wildflowers who helped oversee the restoration of more than 100 acres of pineland when he worked as a county naturalist." Hammer took Everglades National Park's superintendent and Department of the Interior officials to view a massive orchid in Everglades National Park. It later blew over in Hurricane Irma.
