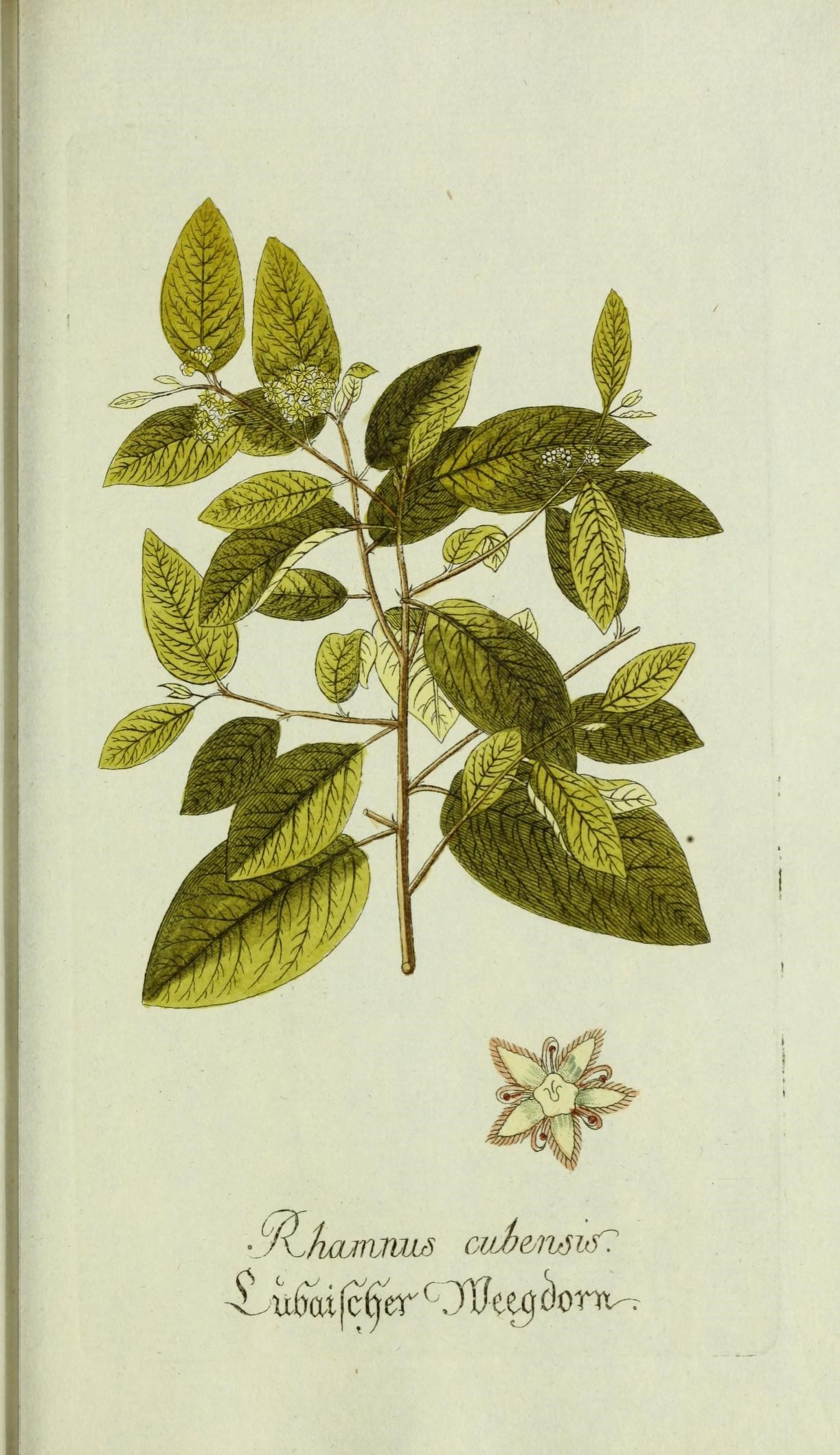
- Botanical illustration

Conservation status
- Data Deficient (IUCN 3.1)

Scientific classification
- Kingdom: Plantae
- Clade: Tracheophytes
- Clade: Angiosperms
- Clade: Eudicots
- Clade: Rosids
- Order: Rosales
- Family: Rhamnaceae
- Genus: Colubrina
- Species: C. cubensis

Binomial name
- Colubrina cubensis (Jacq.) Brongn.

Varieties
- Colubrina cubensis var. cubensis; Colubrina cubensis var. ekmanii M.C.Johnst.; Colubrina cubensis var. floridana M.C.Johnst.

Synonyms
- Ceanothus cubensis (Jacq.) Lam.; Marcorella cubensis (Jacq.) Raf.; Rhamnus cubensis Jacq.

= Colubrina cubensis =

Species of flowering plant

Colubrina cubensis is a species of perennial shrub that grows in Florida and parts of the Caribbean. Commonly known as Cuban colubrina, Cuban nakedwood or Cuban snakebark, it is in the Colubrina genus and Rhamnaceae (buckthorn) family. In Florida it grows in rockland hammock habitats. It is native to Bahamas, Cayman Islands, Cuba, and the United States (limited to Florida). In Florida it grows in the southeastern tip of the Florida peninsula and on the Keys.

It is an evergreen that can reach 9 m (30 ft) tall. It has small clusters of flowers and produces capsule fruit.

Three varieties are accepted.

- Colubrina cubensis var. cubensis – Cayman Islands and western and west-central Cuba
- Colubrina cubensis var. ekmanii M.C.Johnst. – eastern Cuba
- Colubrina cubensis var. floridana M.C.Johnst. – Bahamas and southern Florida
