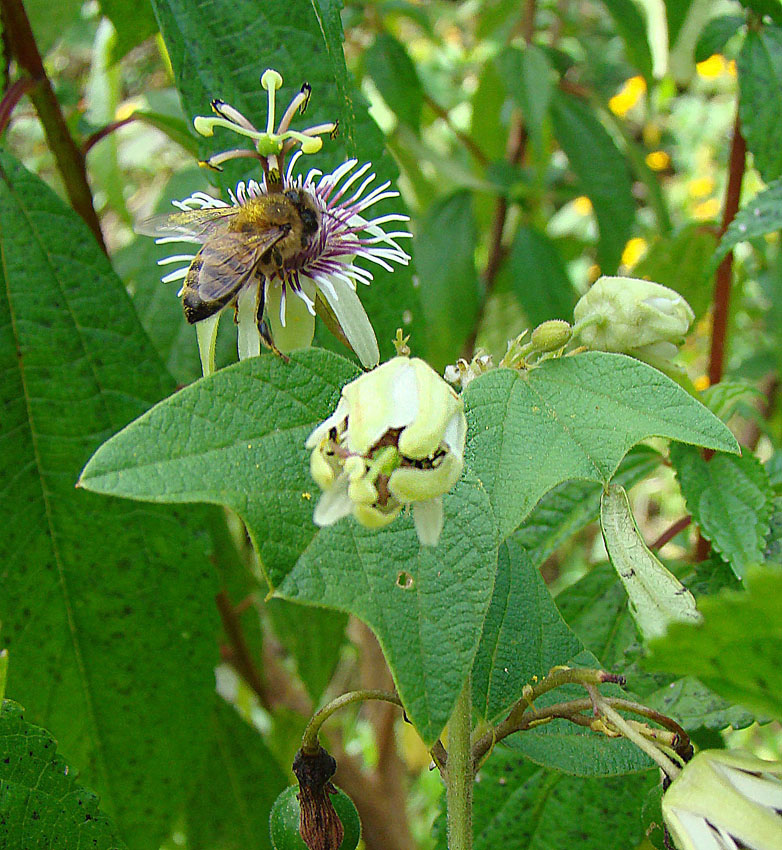

Scientific classification
- Kingdom: Plantae
- Clade: Tracheophytes
- Clade: Angiosperms
- Clade: Eudicots
- Clade: Rosids
- Order: Malpighiales
- Family: Passifloraceae
- Genus: Passiflora
- Species: P. sexflora

Binomial name
- Passiflora sexflora Juss.

Synonyms
- List: Decaloba sexflora (Juss.) M.Roem.; Cieca pannosa (Sm.) M.Roem.; Disemma floribunda E.Fourn.; Lortetia sexflora Ser.; Meioperis pannosa (Sm.) Raf.; Passiflora capsularis var. geminiflora Mast.; Passiflora capsularis var. geminifolia DC.; Passiflora floribunda Lem.; Passiflora isotriloba Cufod.; Passiflora melahelos Gilli; Passiflora miraflorensis Killip; Passiflora obscura G.Don; Passiflora pannosa Sm.; Passiflora rugosissima Killip; Passiflora triflora Macfad. ex Fawc. & Rendle

= Passiflora sexflora =

Species of flowering plant

Passiflora sexflora is a species of perennial vine in the genus Passiflora and the Passifloraceae family. Its common names include goat's foot leaf or goatsfoot. It grows in Mexico down through parts of Central American and countries in northwestern South America as well as in Florida and Caribbean islands.

Its flowers are a nectar source and it is a host plant for species of butterfly.
