= Port Tampa City Library =

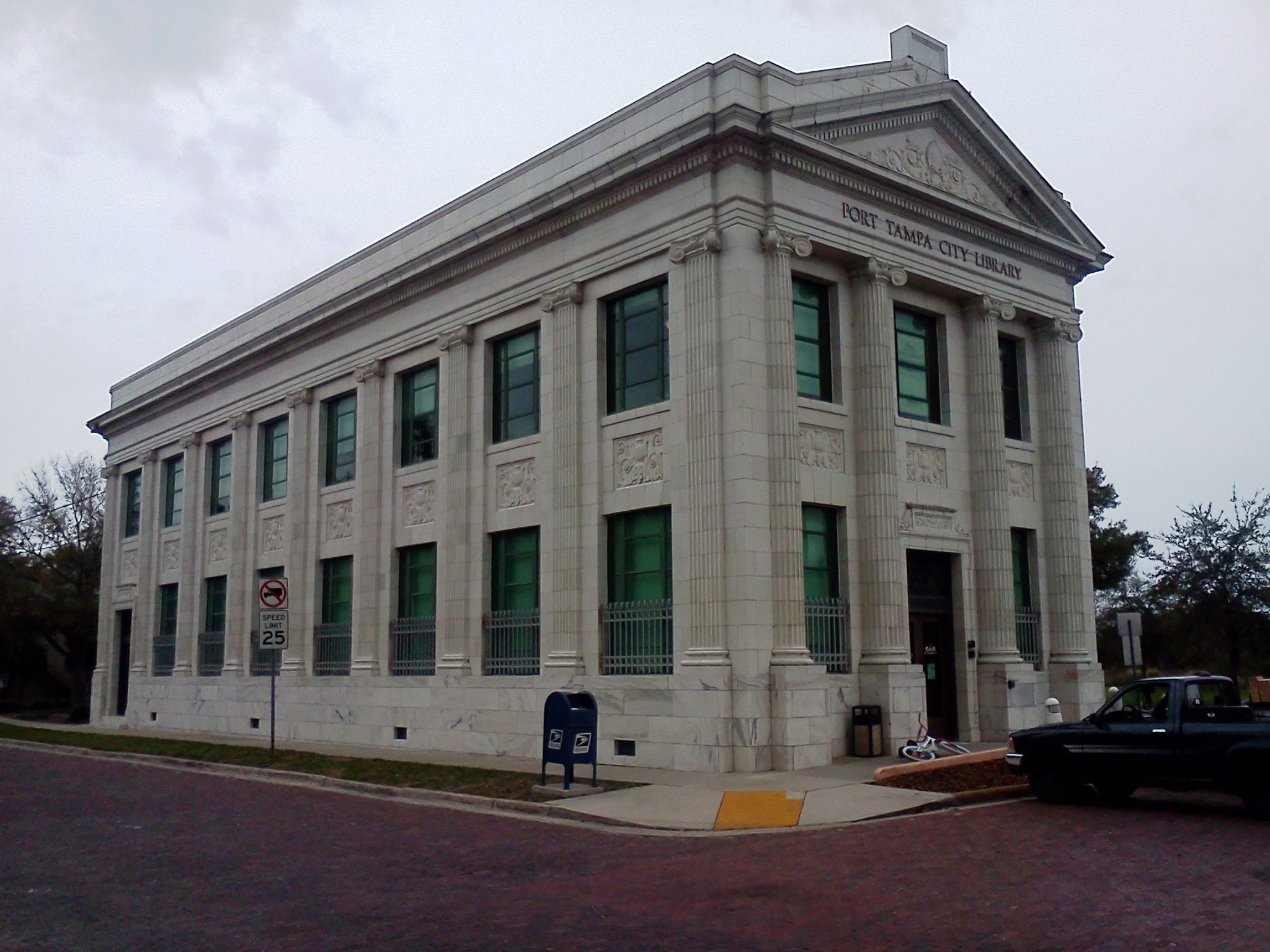
- Interactive map of the Port Tampa City Library area

General information
- Architectural style: Neoclassical
- Location: 4902 W. Commerce St., Tampa, Florida
- Coordinates: 27.8640660°N 82.5279230°W
- Opened: 1951
- Renovated: 1997

Website
- http://www.hcplc.org/hcplc/locations/ptm/

The Port Tampa City Library is a library located in a historic bank building in the Port Tampa section of Tampa, Florida, at 4902 W. Commerce Street. It is a neighborhood branch in the Tampa-Hillsborough County Public Library System.

== History ==
A branch library building in the area was originally located at 8611 Interbay Boulevard and staffed by volunteers from the Woman's Club and Civic Association of Port Tampa City from 1951 until 1961, when Port Tampa City was annexed by the City of Tampa. The Tampa library system took over the library in 1962. The original library building was demolished in 2006 due to asbestos and mold.

== New home ==
The current Neoclassical library building was built by James G. Yeats in 1926 and served as the First Bank of Port Tampa. It closed in 1933 after suffering through the stock market crash of 1929, and Mr. Yeats passed away in the same year. In the following years it housed a grocery store, a health clinic, a flight school, and a boutique.

In 1993 the Women's Club began a funding drive to save the old bank building, which had been vacant for many years, after members noticed a demolition notice attached to it. By 1994 the building was made a historic landmark, and the Club eventually raised $5,000 to help save it. That money was given to the Friends of the Port Tampa City Library. In 1998 the 5,700-square-foot building reopened as the Port Tampa City Library, with a grand opening ceremony on June 14, 1998 — Flag Day — and the centennial of the embarkation from Port Tampa for Cuba bound troops in the Spanish–American War. The ceremony included a ceremonial "Passage of the Book", in which the very last book to be moved from the old building to the new one was passed along by community members until reaching its final destination.

== Design ==
The interior of the library includes marble and terrazzo floors; a cast plaster, coffered ceiling with egg-and-dart and dentil molding; custom made cherry cabinetry; and, on the second floor, a Maritime Reading Room. The outside has a marble base and glazed white terracotta tile, Ionic pilasters and panels with urns and floral decorations, and bronze doors set in bronze frames. Formerly outside the building were the Port Tampa City Benches, commissioned in 1998 through Hillsborough County's Public Art Program. The benches, fabricated by artist Susan B. Gott, consist of 28 kiln cast, multi-colored glass tiles set in steel and are now located on the second floor.

== Maritime Reading Room ==
After the library’s relocation into the Commerce Bank Building in 1998, the Maritime Reading Room was designed and opened as a display meant to “appeal to anyone with a passing, passionate, or professional interest in boats, sailing and the sea." The room houses over 350 books. Subjects range from the folkloric to the encyclopedic, to the instructional and technical. In addition to books, a number of sea-related artifacts are displayed, including scale-models of ships, navigational equipment, and antique boat parts. Because Port Tampa had been an industrial port as well as a major stop on Henry B. Plant’s steamship line, the Port Tampa City Library was felt to be the most appropriate home for the collection.

== Events and Programs ==
Like other libraries in the Hillsborough County Public Library Cooperative, the Port Tampa City Library hosts educational and entertaining programs throughout the year. Programs range from children and family story times to technology help and more. A list of upcoming events can be found on the HCPLC website.
