= Lillibridge, Florida =

Lillibridge
- Unincorporated community
- Location within the state of Florida
- Coordinates: 27°47′31″N 82°06′34″W
- Country: United States
- State: Florida
- County: Hillsborough
- Time zone: UTC-5 (Eastern (EST))
  - Summer (DST): UTC-4 (EDT)

Lillibridge is an unincorporated community in southeastern Hillsborough County, Florida, United States, three miles east of Florida State Road 39, near Lithia.

== History ==
Lillibridge was founded in the 1880s by Morton Lillibridge. Because there was no bridge over the Alafia River, the community was very isolated. A trip to Tampa took three days by oxcart, provided the water was low enough to cross Alderman's Ford. In 1905, the Seaboard Railroad built a line that stopped in Lillibridge until about 1916, at which time the Lillibridge post office shut down. In the early 20th century, phosphate became a huge local business, with Prairie Pebble Phosphate Company and the Coronet Phosphate Company operating mines in the area, some of which still exist today as part of the Mosaic Companies. The population has declined to the point that the identity of the community is more or less unknown to residents today.

== Education ==
Lillibridge is served by Hillsborough County Schools. Students are zoned for Pinecrest Elementary, Turkey Creek Middle School and Durant High School.
