= Hillsborough County, Florida =

County in Florida, United States

- County
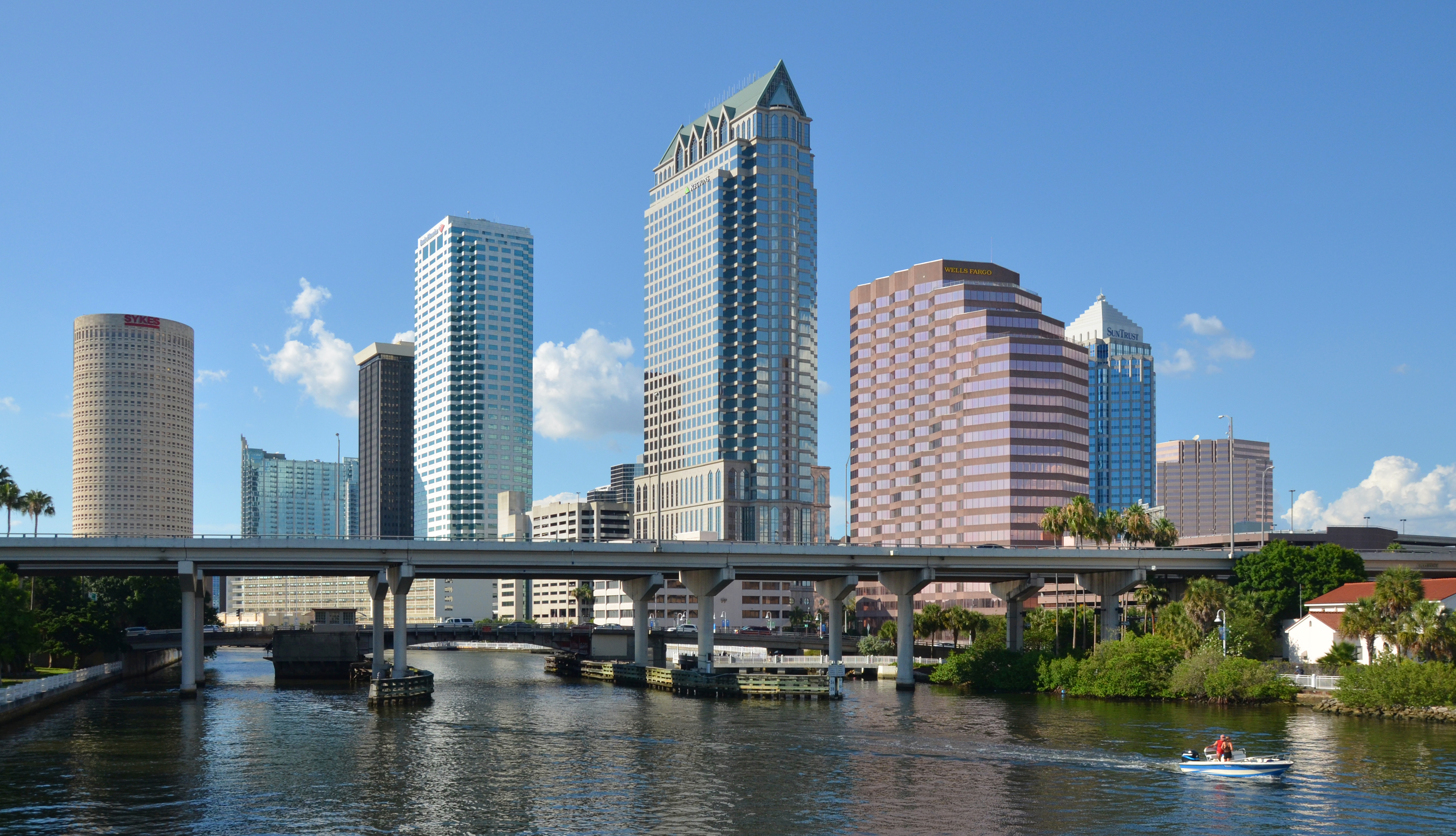
- Downtown Tampa skyline

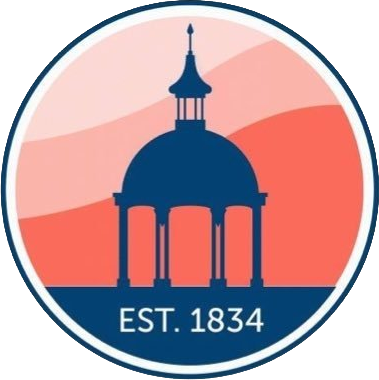
- Flag Seal Logo

- Location within the U.S. state of Florida
- Coordinates: 27°55′N 82°21′W
- Country: United States
- State: Florida
- Founded: January 25, 1834
- Named for: Wills Hill, Earl of Hillsborough
- Seat: Tampa
- Largest city: Tampa

Area
  - Total: 1,266 sq mi (3,280 km^{2})
  - Land: 1,020 sq mi (2,600 km^{2})
  - Water: 246 sq mi (640 km^{2}) 19.4%

Population (2020)
  - Total: 1,459,762
  - Estimate (2025): 1,574,115 ▲
  - Density: 1,430/sq mi (553/km^{2})

GDP
  - Total: $152.010 billion (2024)
- Time zone: UTC−5 (Eastern)
  - Summer (DST): UTC−4 (EDT)
- Congressional districts: 14th, 15th, 16th
- Website: hcfl.gov

Hillsborough County is located in the west-central portion of the U.S. state of Florida. In the 2020 census, the population was 1,459,762, making it the fourth-most populous county in Florida and the most populous county outside the Miami metropolitan area. An estimate in 2021 shows the population of Hillsborough County at 1,512,070 people with a yearly growth rate of 1.34%, which itself is greater than the populations of 12 states according to their 2019 population estimates. Its county seat and largest city is Tampa. Hillsborough County is part of the Tampa–St. Petersburg–Clearwater Metropolitan Statistical Area.

== History ==
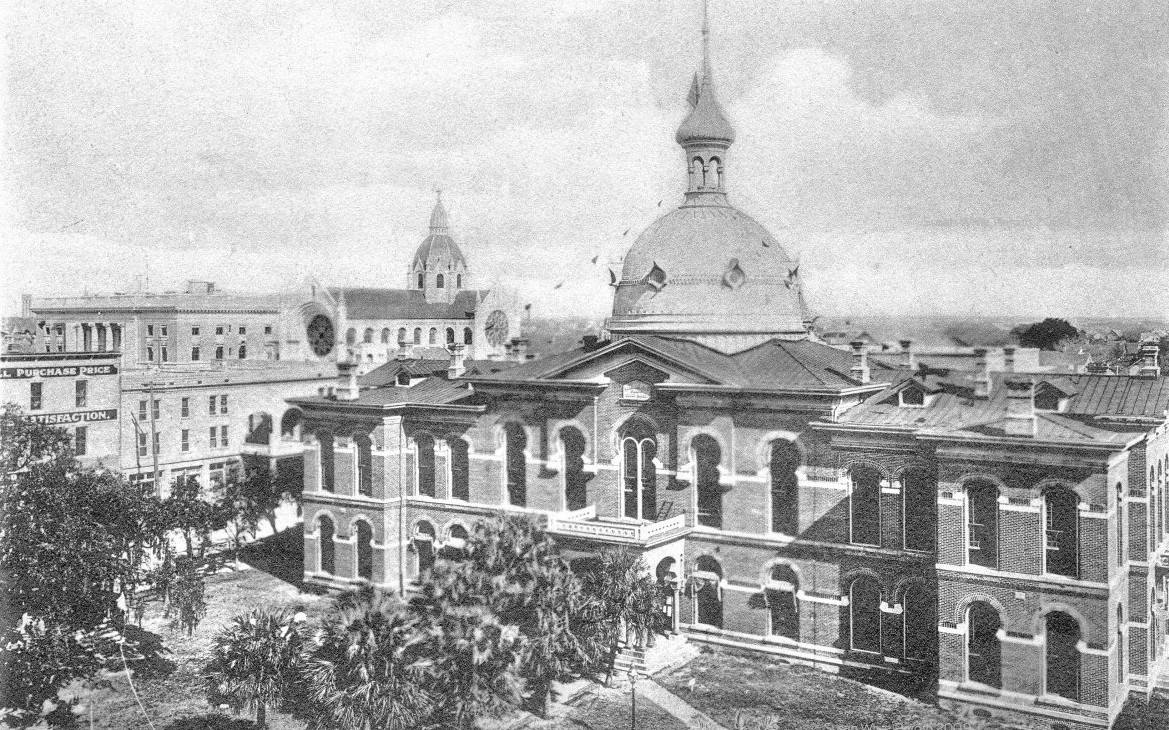
Hillsborough County Courthouse, c. 1891

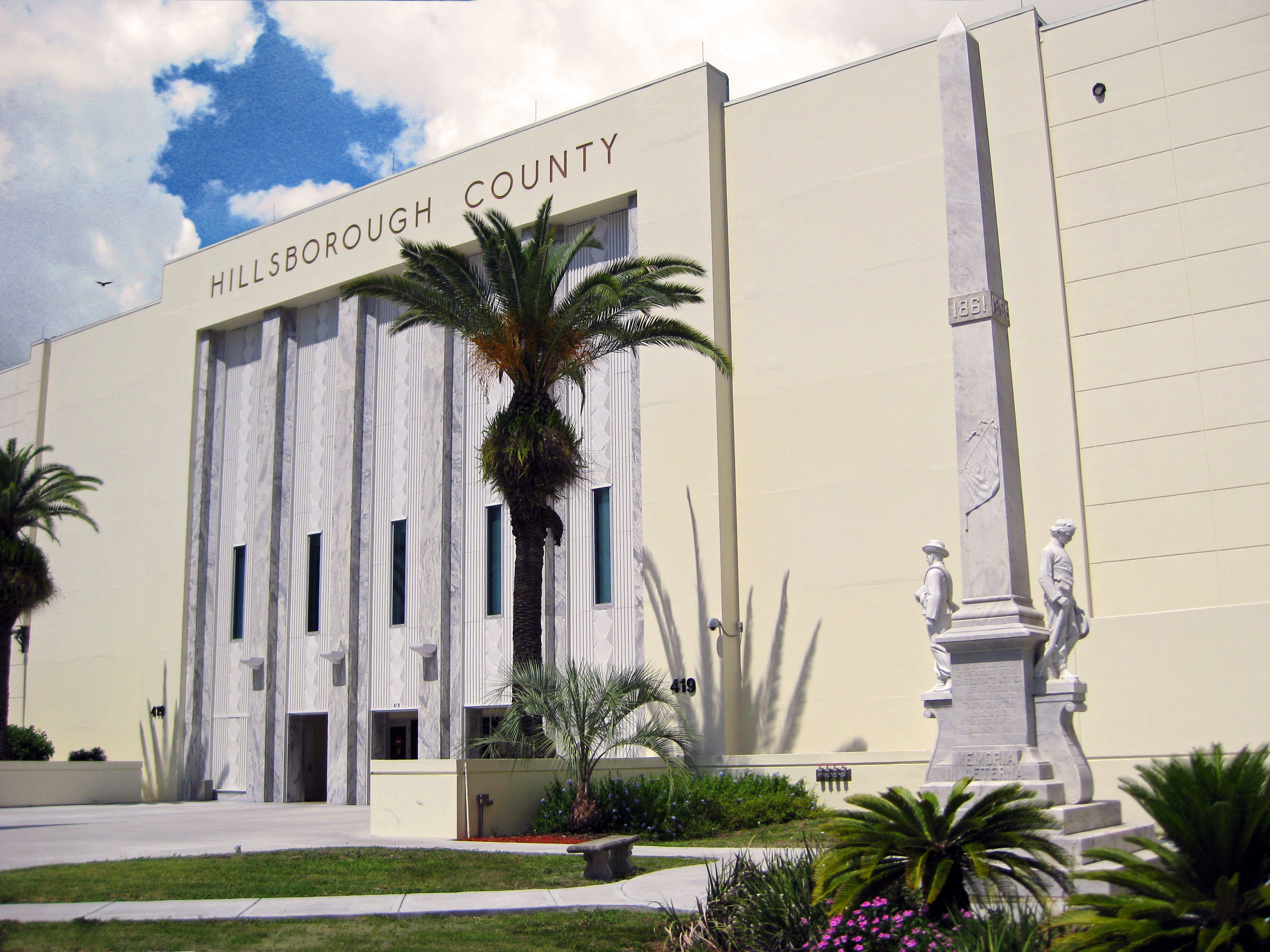
Hillsborough County Courthouse and Confederate Monument in Tampa

Hillsborough County was created on January 25, 1834, from Alachua and Monroe Counties, during the U.S. territorial period (1822–1845). The new county was named for Wills Hill, the Earl of Hillsborough, who served as British Secretary of State for the Colonies from 1768 to 1772. The County was created through efforts by Augustus Steele.

The county's 1834 area was much larger and included eight other present-day counties: Charlotte County, DeSoto, Hardee, Manatee, Pasco, Pinellas, Polk, and Sarasota.

The last significant change in Hillsborough County's borders was the separation of its western section to create Pinellas County in 1911.

On New Year's Day in 1914, the St. Petersburg-Tampa Airboat Line initiated the first scheduled commercial airline service in the world, from St. Petersburg to Tampa.

== Geography ==
According to the U.S. Census Bureau, the county has a total area of 1,266 square miles (3,280 km^{2}), of which 1,020 square miles (2,600 km^{2}) are land and 246 square miles (640 km^{2}) (19.4%) are covered by water. About 158.27 miles (254.71 km) of shoreline are on Tampa Bay.

The county's unincorporated area is around 888 square miles (2,300 km^{2}), more than 84% of the total land area. Municipalities account for 163 square miles (420 km^{2}). The modern boundaries of the county place it midway along the west coast of Florida.

A narrow portion of Hillsborough County to the south, consisting almost exclusively of water, extends west to the Gulf of Mexico roughly along the Tampa Port Shipping Channel. This has the effect of keeping Hillsborough County from being technically landlocked. The central portion of the Sunshine Skyway Bridge is in Hillsborough County. So is Egmont Key, at the entrance to Tampa Bay; this narrow strip of land separates Pinellas County from Manatee County. The northernmost tip of a spoil island just west of Port Manatee also lies in Hillsborough County.

Hillsborough is home to Alafia River State Park and Hillsborough River state parks, and to the C. W. Bill Young Regional Reservoir and Lithia Springs, one of the largest natural springs in Florida.

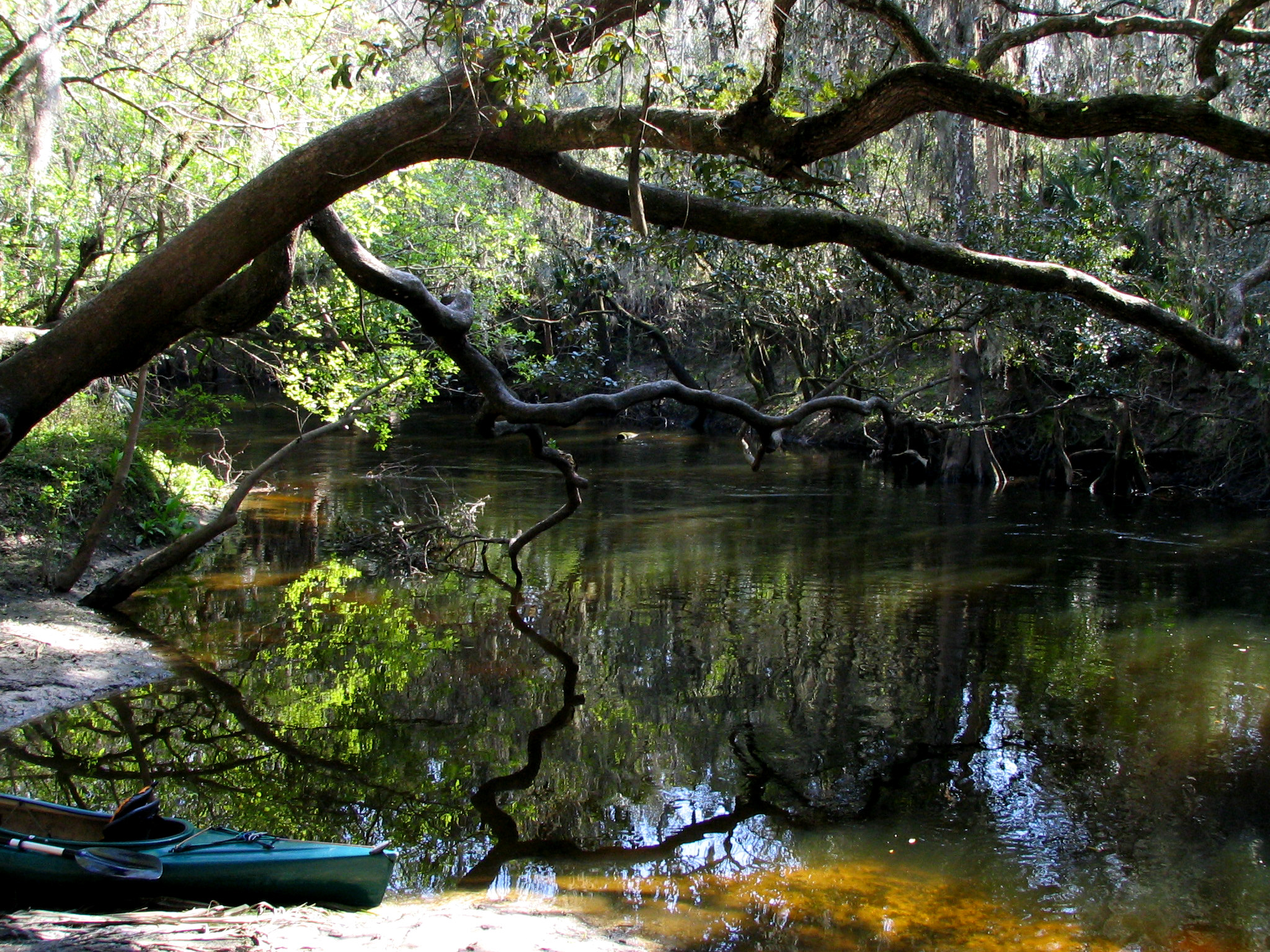
On the Alafia River near Lithia Springs Park

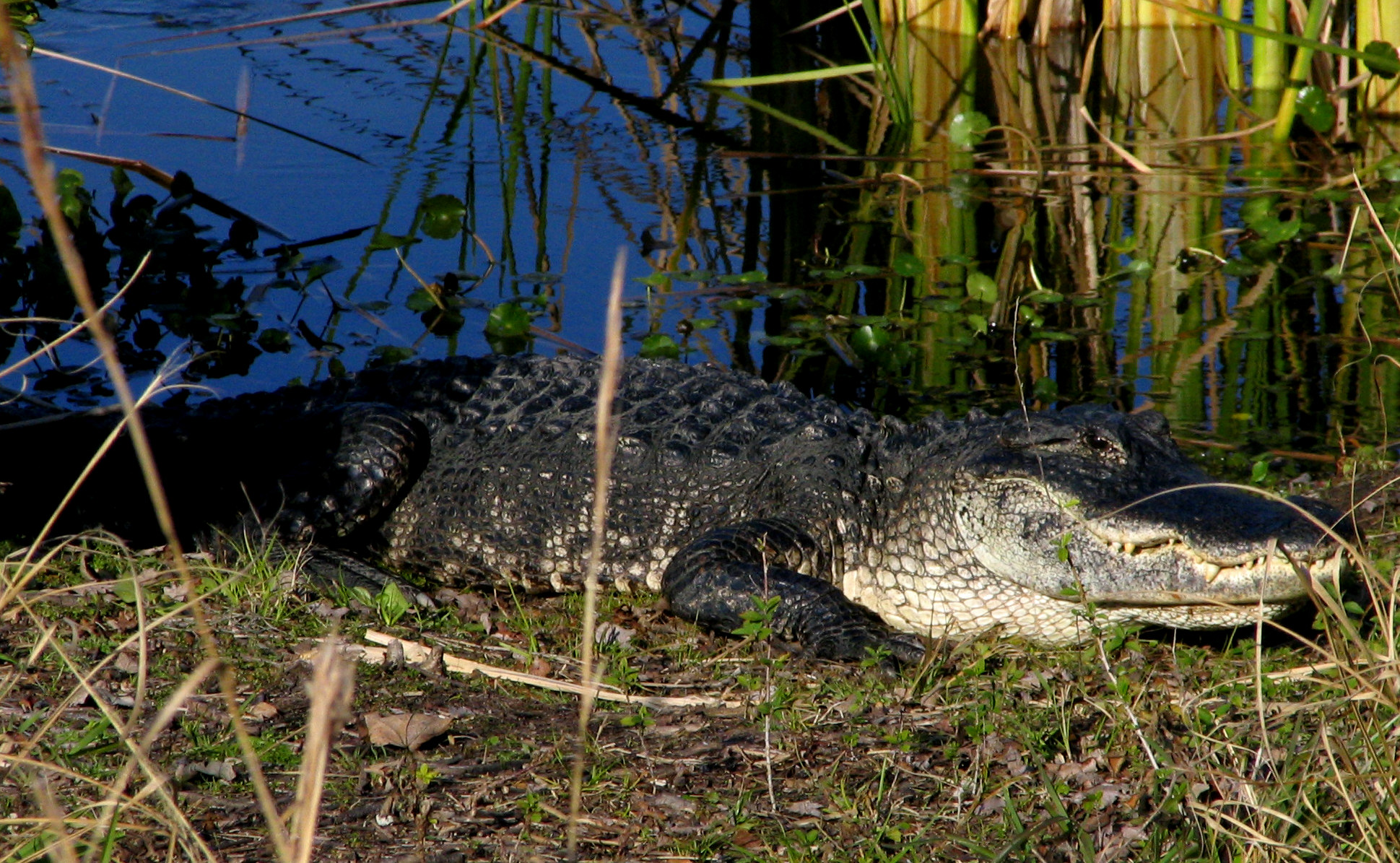
An alligator in the Alafia River State Park

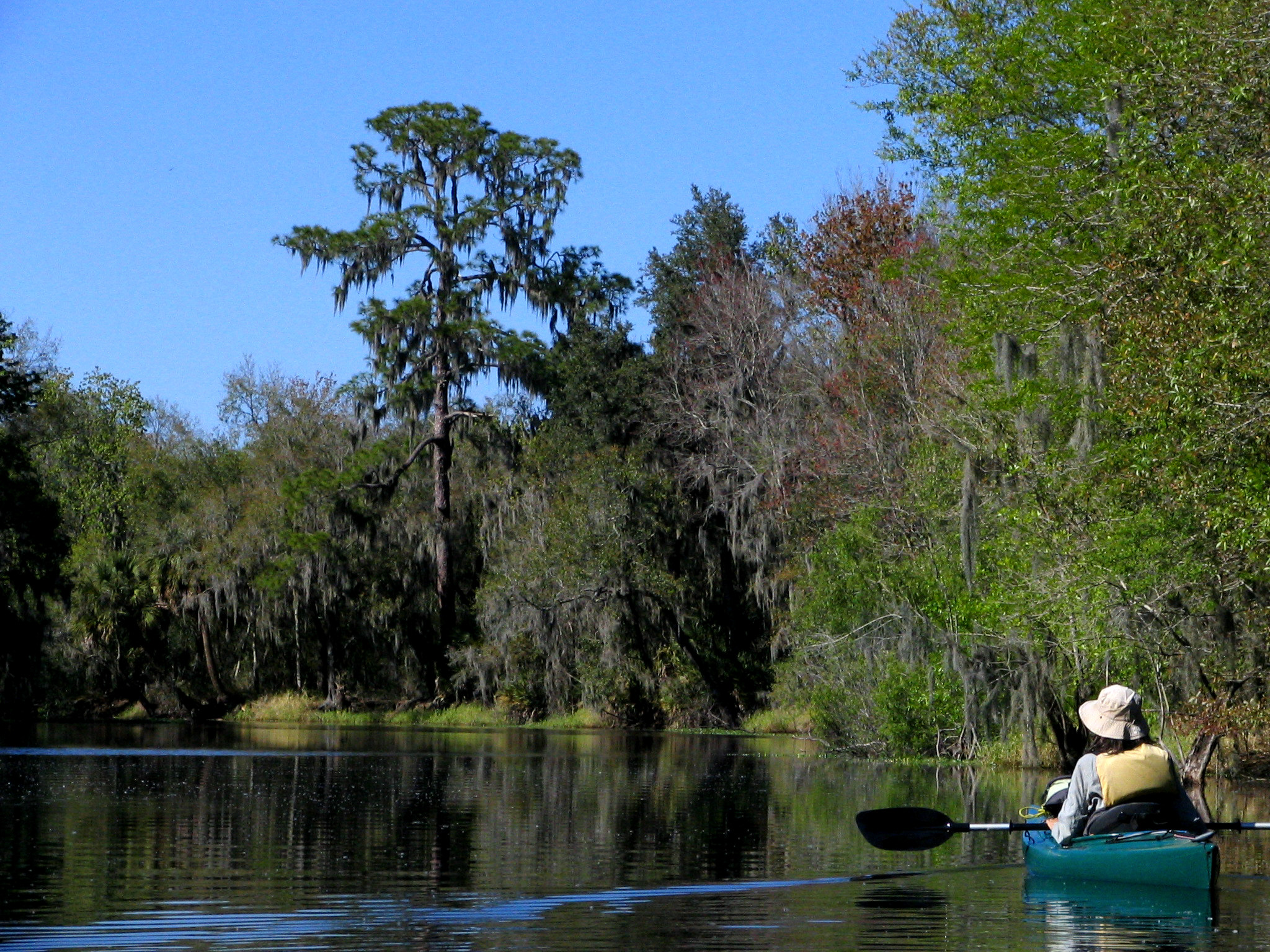
Hurrah Lake on the Alafia River

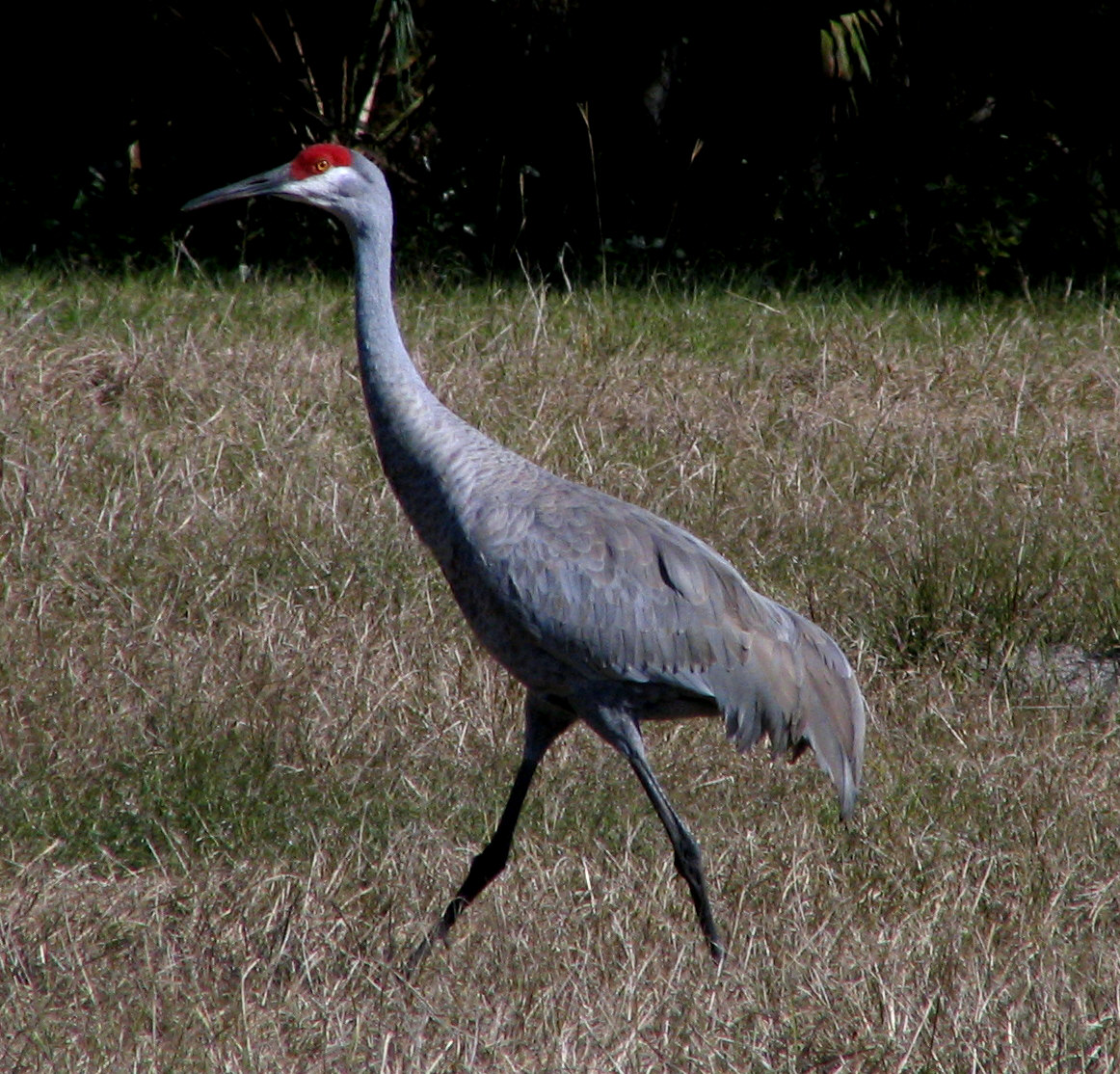
Sandhill crane at Hillsborough River State Park

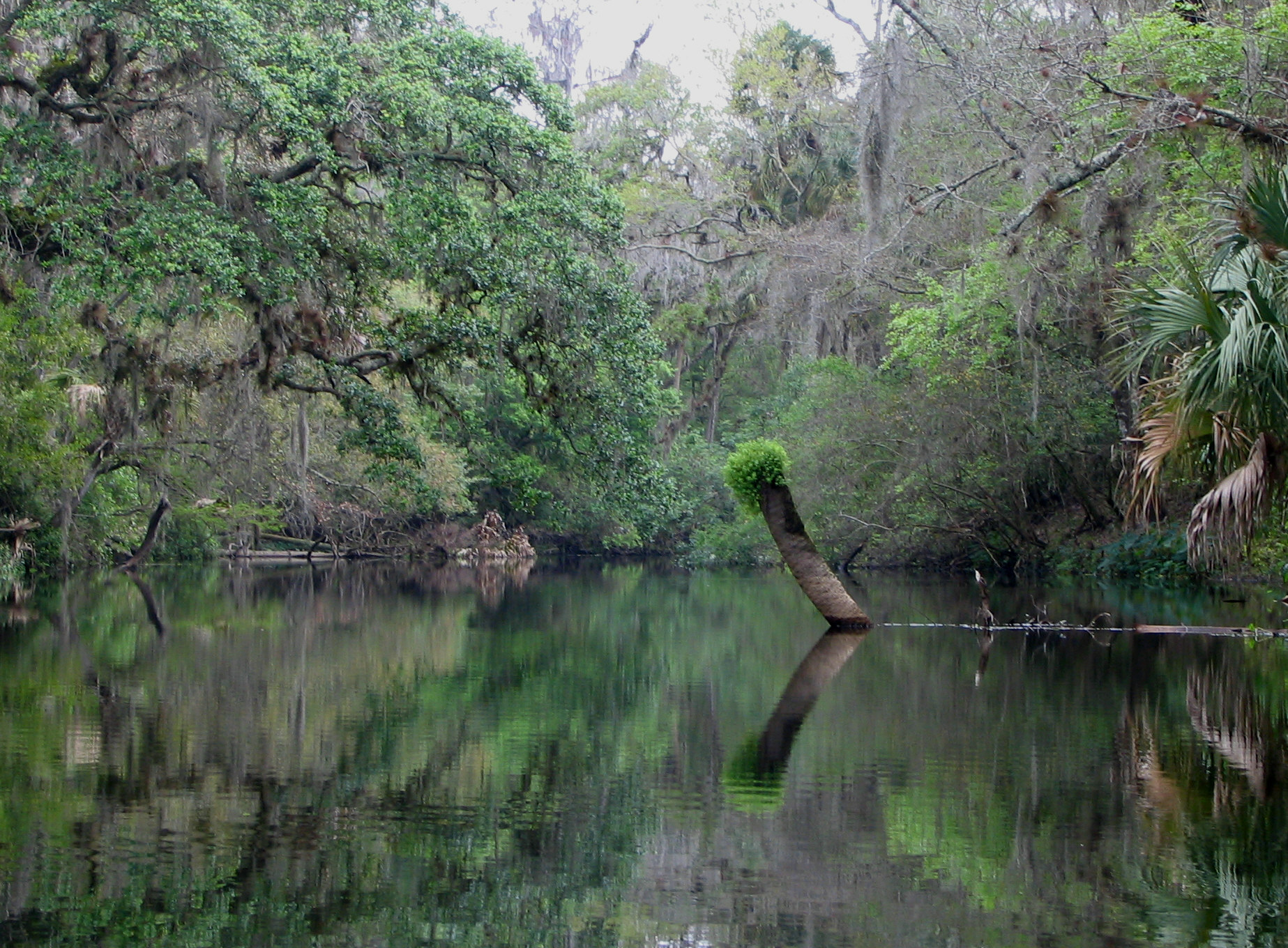
On the Hillsborough River near Lettuce Lake Park

=== Adjacent counties ===
- Pasco County – north
- Polk County – east
- Manatee County – south
- Pinellas County – west
- Hardee County – southeast

== Demographics ==
Historical population
| Census | Pop. | Note | %± |
|---|---|---|---|
| 1840 | 452 | | — |
| 1850 | 2,377 | | 425.9% |
| 1860 | 2,981 | | 25.4% |
| 1870 | 3,216 | | 7.9% |
| 1880 | 5,814 | | 80.8% |
| 1890 | 14,941 | | 157.0% |
| 1900 | 36,013 | | 141.0% |
| 1910 | 78,374 | | 117.6% |
| 1920 | 88,257 | | 12.6% |
| 1930 | 153,519 | | 73.9% |
| 1940 | 180,148 | | 17.3% |
| 1950 | 249,894 | | 38.7% |
| 1960 | 397,788 | | 59.2% |
| 1970 | 490,265 | | 23.2% |
| 1980 | 646,960 | | 32.0% |
| 1990 | 834,054 | | 28.9% |
| 2000 | 998,948 | | 19.8% |
| 2010 | 1,229,226 | | 23.1% |
| 2020 | 1,459,762 | | 18.8% |
| 2025 (est.) | 1,574,115 | ▲ | 7.8% |
U.S. Decennial Census; 1790–1960 1900–1990; 1990–2000 2010–2019 2022

=== 2020 census ===
As of the 2020 census, the county had a population of 1,459,762, a median age of 37.6 years, 22.0% of residents were under the age of 18, and 15.1% of residents were 65 years of age or older. For every 100 females there were 94.7 males, and for every 100 females age 18 and over there were 92.0 males.

The racial makeup of the county was 52.6% White, 16.3% Black or African American, 0.5% American Indian and Alaska Native, 4.9% Asian, 0.1% Native Hawaiian and Pacific Islander, 8.9% from some other race, and 16.9% from two or more races. Hispanic or Latino residents of any race comprised 29.3% of the population.

96.3% of residents lived in urban areas, while 3.7% lived in rural areas.

There were 559,949 households in the county, of which 31.1% had children under the age of 18 living in them. Of all households, 43.8% were married-couple households, 19.2% were households with a male householder and no spouse or partner present, and 29.0% were households with a female householder and no spouse or partner present. About 26.7% of all households were made up of individuals and 9.1% had someone living alone who was 65 years of age or older.

There were 602,886 housing units, of which 7.1% were vacant. Among occupied housing units, 59.0% were owner-occupied and 41.0% were renter-occupied. The homeowner vacancy rate was 2.0% and the rental vacancy rate was 7.0%.

=== Racial and ethnic composition ===
Hillsborough County, Florida – Racial and ethnic composition Note: the US Census treats Hispanic/Latino as an ethnic category. This table excludes Latinos from the racial categories and assigns them to a separate category. Hispanics/Latinos may be of any race.
| Race / Ethnicity (NH = Non-Hispanic) | Pop 1980 | Pop 1990 | Pop 2000 | Pop 2010 | Pop 2020 | % 1980 | % 1990 | % 2000 | % 2010 | % 2020 |
|---|---|---|---|---|---|---|---|---|---|---|
| White alone (NH) | 491,299 | 606,466 | 632,605 | 660,565 | 667,791 | 75.94% | 72.71% | 63.33% | 53.74% | 45.75% |
| Black or African American alone (NH) | 84,834 | 107,111 | 144,259 | 191,260 | 224,479 | 13.11% | 12.84% | 14.44% | 15.56% | 15.38% |
| Native American or Alaska Native alone (NH) | 1,337 | 2,183 | 2,991 | 2,948 | 2,817 | 0.21% | 0.26% | 0.30% | 0.24% | 0.19% |
| Asian alone (NH) | 3,833 | 10,901 | 21,585 | 41,328 | 69,928 | 0.59% | 1.31% | 2.16% | 3.36% | 4.79% |
| Native Hawaiian or Pacific Islander alone (NH) | x | x | 610 | 703 | 914 | x | x | 0.06% | 0.06% | 0.06% |
| Other race alone (NH) | 1,458 | 485 | 1,968 | 2,992 | 9,655 | 0.23% | 0.06% | 0.20% | 0.24% | 0.66% |
| Mixed race or Multiracial (NH) | x | x | 15,238 | 22,795 | 56,797 | x | x | 1.53% | 1.85% | 3.89% |
| Hispanic or Latino (any race) | 64,199 | 106,908 | 179,692 | 306,635 | 427,381 | 9.92% | 12.82% | 17.99% | 24.95% | 29.28% |
| Total | 646,960 | 834,054 | 998,948 | 1,229,226 | 1,459,762 | 100.00% | 100.00% | 100.00% | 100.00% | 100.00% |

A map of racial demographics in Hillsborough County by Census tract Legend: Non-Hispanic White 30–40% 40–50% 50–60% 60–70% 70–80% 80–90% >90% Hispanic 30–40% 40–50% 50–60% 60–70% 70–80% 80–90% Black or African American 30–40% 40–50% 50–60% 60–70% 70–80% 80–90% Equal No population

=== 2010 Census ===
U.S. Census Bureau 2010 Ethnic/Race Demographics:

- White (non-Hispanic) (71.3% when including White Hispanics): 53.7% (12.1% German, 11.0% Irish, 8.9% English, 6.7% Italian, 2.6% French, 2.4% Polish, 1.9% Scottish, 1.6% Scotch-Irish, 1.3% Dutch, 0.8% Russian, 0.8% Swedish, 0.7% Welsh, 0.6% French Canadian, 0.6% Norwegian, 0.5% Hungarian, 0.5% Greek)
- Black (non-Hispanic) (16.7% when including Black Hispanics): 15.6% (2.4% West Indian/Afro-Caribbean American, 0.7% Jamaican, 0.6% Haitian, 0.5% Other or Unspecified West Indian, 0.1% Trinidadian and Tobagonian, 0.1% British West Indian, 0.1% U.S. Virgin Islander, 0.9% Subsaharan African)
- Hispanic or Latino of any race: 24.9% (7.4% Puerto Rican, 5.3% Cuban, 5.3% Mexican, 1.2% Colombian, 1.1% Dominican, 0.7% Spaniard, 0.5% Honduran)
- Asian: 3.4% (1.2% Indian, 0.5% Vietnamese, 0.5% Filipino, 0.4% Chinese, 0.4% Other Asian, 0.3% Korean, 0.1% Japanese)
- Two or more races: 3.1%
- American Indian and Alaska Native: 0.4%
- Native Hawaiian and Other Pacific Islander: 0.1%
- Other Races: 5.0% (0.6% Arab)

In 2010, 6.0% of the Hillsborough's population considered themselves to be of only American ancestry (regardless of race or ethnicity.)

Of the 536,092 households, 29.74% had children under the age of 18 living with them, 44.25% were married couples living together, 14.76% had a female householder with no husband present, and 35.69% were not families. About 27.12% of all households were made up of individuals, and 7.96% (2.35% male and 5.61% female) had someone living alone who was 65 years of age or older. The average household size was 2.55 and the average family size was 3.11.

The age distribution was 23.9% under the age of 18, 10.5% from 18 to 24, 28.3% from 25 to 44, 25.4% from 45 to 64, and 11.8% were 65 years of age or older. The median age was 36.1 years. For every 100 females, there were 95.1 males. For every 100 females age 18 and over, there were 92.1 males.

The median income for a household in the county was $49,536, and for a family was $59,886. Males had a median income of $43,125 versus $35,184 for females. The per capita income for the county was $27,062. About 10.7% of families and 14.2% of the population were below the poverty line, including 19.9% of those under age 18 and 9.6% of those aged 65 or over.

In 2010, 15.1% of the county's population was foreign born, with 44.5% being naturalized American citizens. Of foreign-born residents, 67.5% were born in Latin America, 16.7% born in Asia, 9.2% were born in Europe, 3.2% born in Africa, 3.1% in North America, and 0.3% were born in Oceania.

=== 2000 Census ===
As of the census of 2000, 998,948 people, 391,357 households, and 255,164 families resided in the county. The population density was 951 inhabitants per square mile (367/km^{2}). The 425,962 housing units averaged 405 per square mile (156/km^{2}). The racial makeup of the county was 75.17% White (63.3% Non-Hispanic White), 14.96% Black or African American, 0.39% Native American, 2.20% Asian, 0.07% Pacific Islander, 4.66% from other races, and a 2.56% from two or more races. 17.99% of the population were Hispanic or Latino of any race. The county was the thirty-second most populous county in the nation.

Of the 391,357 households, 31.40% had children under the age of 18 living with them, 47.70% were married couples living together, 13.20% had a female householder with no husband present, and 34.80% were not families. Roughly 26.90% of all households were made up of individuals, and 8.10% had someone living alone who was 65 years of age or older. The average household size was 2.51 and the average family size was 3.07.

The age distribution was: 25.30% under the age of 18, 9.30% from 18 to 24, 31.70% from 25 to 44, 21.70% from 45 to 64, and 12.00% were 65 years of age or older. The median age was 35 years. For every 100 females there were 95.80 males. For every 100 females age 18 and over, there were 92.70 males.

The median income for a household in the county was $40,663, and for a family was $48,223. Males had a median income of $34,111 versus $26,962 for females. The per capita income for the county was $21,812. About 9.10% of families and 12.50% of the population were below the poverty line, including 17.20% of those under age 18 and 10.00% of those age 65 or over.

Level of Education
| Level | Hillsborough Co. | Florida | U.S. |
| College/Associate Degree | 29.0% | 28.8% | 27.4% |
| Bachelor's Degree | 16.7% | 14.3% | 15.5% |
| Master's or PhD | 8.4% | 8.1% | 8.9% |
| Total | 54.1% | 51.2% | 51.8% |

Source: U.S. Census

=== Languages ===
As of 2010, 74.59% of the population spoke only English at home, 19.52% spoke Spanish, 0.56% French Creole (mainly Haitian Creole), and 0.51% spoke Vietnamese as their mother language. In total, 25.41% of the population spoke a language other than English as their primary language.

== Politics and government ==
=== Voter registration ===
According to the Florida Secretary of State's office, Republicans now make up the plurality of active registered voters in Hillsborough County.

Hillsborough county voter registration & party enrollment as of June 10, 2025
| Political party | Total Voters | Percentage |
|---|---|---|
| Republican | 287,137 | 36.08% |
| Democratic | 270,431 | 33.98% |
| No Party Affiliation | 212,512 | 26.70% |
| Minor parties | 25,803 | 3.24% |
| Total | 795,883 | 100.00% |

=== Statewide and national elections ===
Hillsborough County tends to lean Democratic, having not been won by a Republican presidential candidate from 2004 until 2024. It is part of the politically important I-4 Corridor between Tampa Bay and Orlando, an area that historically decides most elections in Florida. Hillsborough was considered a bellwether county, voting for the statewide winner in every presidential election from 1964–2012. It has also voted for the winner of the presidency in every election since 1928 except twice, voting for the loser only in 1992 and 2016. The southern portion of the county, around Tampa, is powerfully Democratic, while the northern and eastern portions are heavily Republican.

On the statewide level, the county also tends to lean Democratic with Democrats Bill Nelson for senator and Andrew Gillum for governor both winning the county in the 2018 elections. However, Republican senator Marco Rubio did win the county in his 2010, 2016 and 2022 senatorial campaigns and Republican Governor Ron Desantis won it in his 2022 gubernatorial campaign after the county supported Democrats for the previous three gubernatorial elections since 2010.

In 2008, Barack Obama won the county by seven points, the first Democrat to capture the county since Bill Clinton's re-election victory in 1996. Obama won Hillsborough again in 2012 over Republican presidential nominee Mitt Romney by roughly the same margin.

In 2016, Donald Trump became the first Republican since Calvin Coolidge in 1924 to win a presidential election without carrying the county.

Donald Trump broke the Democratic streak in the county in 2024, when he carried the county by 3.05%. This reflects the general trend in Florida towards the Republican Party in recent elections.

United States presidential election results for Hillsborough County, Florida
| Year | Republican | | Democratic | | Third party(ies) | |
| Year | No. | % | No. | % | No. | % |
|---|---|---|---|---|---|---|
| 1892 | 0 | 0.00% | 2,718 | 95.60% | 125 | 4.40% |
| 1896 | 584 | 20.14% | 2,115 | 72.96% | 200 | 6.90% |
| 1900 | 349 | 10.76% | 2,257 | 69.55% | 639 | 19.69% |
| 1904 | 516 | 16.38% | 1,976 | 62.71% | 659 | 20.91% |
| 1908 | 367 | 9.94% | 2,703 | 73.17% | 624 | 16.89% |
| 1912 | 159 | 4.07% | 2,641 | 67.63% | 1,105 | 28.30% |
| 1916 | 691 | 10.45% | 4,627 | 69.95% | 1,297 | 19.61% |
| 1920 | 3,772 | 30.54% | 6,976 | 56.49% | 1,601 | 12.96% |
| 1924 | 1,585 | 22.08% | 4,470 | 62.26% | 1,125 | 15.67% |
| 1928 | 11,703 | 52.98% | 9,993 | 45.24% | 392 | 1.77% |
| 1932 | 4,711 | 19.75% | 19,143 | 80.25% | 0 | 0.00% |
| 1936 | 5,361 | 20.97% | 20,202 | 79.03% | 0 | 0.00% |
| 1940 | 7,805 | 20.25% | 30,738 | 79.75% | 0 | 0.00% |
| 1944 | 10,252 | 24.76% | 31,146 | 75.24% | 0 | 0.00% |
| 1948 | 13,529 | 32.77% | 18,854 | 45.67% | 8,903 | 21.56% |
| 1952 | 36,316 | 52.20% | 33,252 | 47.80% | 0 | 0.00% |
| 1956 | 41,889 | 52.04% | 38,610 | 47.96% | 0 | 0.00% |
| 1960 | 48,887 | 43.99% | 62,240 | 56.01% | 0 | 0.00% |
| 1964 | 50,616 | 41.52% | 71,289 | 58.48% | 0 | 0.00% |
| 1968 | 49,441 | 34.77% | 45,848 | 32.24% | 46,913 | 32.99% |
| 1972 | 106,956 | 70.13% | 45,305 | 29.71% | 249 | 0.16% |
| 1976 | 78,504 | 44.82% | 94,589 | 54.01% | 2,052 | 1.17% |
| 1980 | 106,160 | 51.71% | 88,271 | 42.99% | 10,883 | 5.30% |
| 1984 | 157,926 | 64.67% | 86,230 | 35.31% | 52 | 0.02% |
| 1988 | 150,151 | 59.89% | 99,014 | 39.49% | 1,551 | 0.62% |
| 1992 | 130,643 | 42.07% | 115,282 | 37.13% | 64,577 | 20.80% |
| 1996 | 136,656 | 44.33% | 144,266 | 46.80% | 27,349 | 8.87% |
| 2000 | 180,794 | 50.17% | 169,576 | 47.06% | 9,984 | 2.77% |
| 2004 | 245,576 | 53.01% | 214,132 | 46.23% | 3,514 | 0.76% |
| 2008 | 236,355 | 45.94% | 272,963 | 53.05% | 5,183 | 1.01% |
| 2012 | 250,186 | 46.04% | 286,467 | 52.71% | 6,776 | 1.25% |
| 2016 | 266,870 | 44.19% | 307,896 | 50.99% | 29,124 | 4.82% |
| 2020 | 327,398 | 45.85% | 376,367 | 52.71% | 10,303 | 1.44% |
| 2024 | 342,017 | 50.90% | 321,455 | 47.84% | 8,521 | 1.27% |

Gubernatorial Election Results
| Year | Republican | Democratic | Third parties |
|---|---|---|---|
| 2022 | 54.17% 261,936 | 44.95% 217,349 | 0.87% 4,229 |
| 2018 | 44.86% 234,835 | 53.79% 281,598 | 1.34% 7,037 |
| 2014 | 45.59% 170,127 | 48.29% 180,168 | 6.12% 22,837 |
| 2010 | 46.59% 148,429 | 49.91% 158,995 | 3.51% 11,171 |
| 2006 | 52.80% 152,494 | 44.45% 128,375 | 2.75% 7,931 |
| 2002 | 55.81% 175,629 | 42.67% 134,274 | 0.76% 2,378 |

=== Board of County Commissioners ===
A home rule charter for Hillsborough County was approved by voters in a county-wide referendum held in September 1983, and the first county commissioners elected under this new charter took office on May 28, 1985.

Under a charter ordinance that went into effect May 1985, seven county commissioners are directed to perform legislative functions of government by developing policy for the management of Hillsborough County. The county administrator, a professional appointed by the board, and the administrative staff are responsible for the implementation of these policies.

The board also serves as the Environmental Protection Commission. Individual board members serve on various other boards, authorities, and commissions such as the Hillsborough Area Regional Transit Authority, Tampa Bay Regional Planning Council, Tampa Bay Water, Aviation Authority, Expressway Authority, Sports Authority, Port Authority, Arts Council of Hillsborough County, Children's Board, Metropolitan Planning Organization, and Council of Governments.

The charter divides the power of county government between legislative and executive branches. The Board of County Commissioners, which composes the legislative branch, sets overall policy by means of ordinances, resolutions, and motions.

The executive powers of county government are vested in the county administrator, appointed by county commissioners and charged by the charter to faithfully implement the powers of the board. The charter provides for a county attorney, to be hired by the county administrator with the advice and consent of the county commissioners. The charter contains a provision for a charter review board appointed by County Commissioners every five years to conduct a study of county government and propose amendments to the charter. These amendments must be presented to voters for approval. One amendment was approved in November 2002, adding the position of County Internal Performance Auditor to the government structure. This position reports directly to the County Commission.

The current administrator is Bonnie M. Wise, who took office on July 1, 2020, replacing Mike Merrill, who had served as administrator since 2010. Wise previously served as the county's deputy administrator and Tampa's chief financial officer.

Of the seven members of the Board of County Commissioners for Hillsborough County, four are elected from single-member districts, and three are elected county-wide. The board approves the county's operating and capital budgets and the county's capital-improvement program. It may take action on any programs for the improvement of the county and the welfare of its residents.

As of 2025, The members of the Board are as follows:

- Henry Cohen (D): Single-Member District #1
- Ken Hagan (R): Single-Member District #2
- Gwen Myers (D): Single-Member District #3
- Christine Miller (R): Single-Member District #4
- Donna Cameron Cepeda (R): At-Large District #5
- Chris Boles (R): At-Large District #6
- Joshua Wostal (R): At-Large District #7

=== Government officials ===
These five countywide elected positions have specific responsibilities under the county charter:

- Clerk of the Circuit Court: Victor Crist (R)
- Sheriff: Chad Chronister (R)
- Property Appraiser: Bob Henriquez (D)
- Tax Collector: Nancy Millan (D)
- Supervisor of Elections: Craig Latimer (D)

=== Taxes ===
Hillsborough County's discretionary sales tax rate increased from 1% to 2.5% in January 2019. When combined with the state of Florida's 6%, the rate is 8.5%, the highest in Florida. The rate includes two surcharges approved by voter referendum in November 2018, 1% for transportation and 1/2% for schools. It is only collected on the first $5000 of any large purchase.

== Economy ==
In the early 20th century, Hillsborough's economy was predominantly based on cigar-making and agriculture. In 2012, Hillsborough had the second-largest agricultural output among Florida's counties. As of 2010, the average annual employment in Hillsborough County was 563,292. The percentages of total employment by industry were:

- Natural resources and mining 2.0%
- Construction 4.6%
- Manufacturing 4.1%
- Trade, transportation, and utilities 19.5%
- Information 3.0%
- Financial activities 9.2%
- Professional and business services 18.1%
- Education and health services 14.6%
- Leisure and hospitality 10.3%
- Other services 2.7%
- Public administration 4.7%

=== Agriculture ===
In 2011, sales of all agricultural commodities produced in Hillsborough County were over $832,410,300. The largest crop by value was strawberries at over $388 million. Values of various crops included:

Hillsborough County Agricultural Production 2011
| Crop | Sales in dollars | Acreage |
|---|---|---|
| Strawberries | $388,125,702 | 11,625 |
| Vegetables | $150,000,000 | 13,092 |
| Ornamental plants | $139,232,407 | 3,977 |
| Aquaculture | $23,546,112 | 876 |
| Beef cattle/pasture | $18,934,207 | 91,904 |
| Citrus | $18,893,572 | 10,750 |
| Poultry | $18,701,100 | 22 |
| Sod | $7,438,855 | 2,286 |
| Dairy | $6,433,206 | 1,500 |
| Blueberries | $5,500,000 | 591 |
| Hay | $2,374,195 | 635 |
| Forestry | $1,000,000 | 108,634 |
| Bees/honey | $598,767 | 45 |
| Goats | $154,177 | 518 |
| Miscellaneous | $51,478,000 | 3677 |
| Total | $832,410,300 | 255,532 |

=== List of companies with headquarters in Hillsborough County ===
- Beef O'Brady's Restaurants
- Big Brothers Big Sisters of America
- Bloomin' Brands Restaurants, including Outback Steakhouse, Carrabbas, and others.
- Checkers and Rally's Restaurants
- Front Burner Brands Restaurants, including The Melting Pot, Burger 21, and Grillsmith.
- International Softball Federation
- Lykes Brothers
- Masonite International
- MisterCertified
- Mosaic's Phosphate Division
- Odyssey Marine Exploration
- Patterson Companies
- Rooms To Go Furniture
- Shriners International
- Sweetbay Supermarkets (since absorbed by BI-LO's Winn-Dixie chain) had its headquarters in an unincorporated area in the county, near Tampa.
- Sykes Enterprises

== Education ==
Hillsborough County Public Schools operate the public schools in the county. Hillsborough County has the eighth-largest school district in the United States consisting of 206 schools (133 elementary schools, 42 middle schools, two K-8 schools, 27 traditional high schools, and four career centers, with 73 additional schools including charter, ESE, etc.). In 2013, 12 of Hillsborough County's 27 public high schools were ranked in Newsweek's list of America's Best High Schools. In 2012 and 2013, all 27 public high schools were included on the Washington Post's list of the 2000 most challenging schools in America.

== Museums and libraries ==
=== Museums ===
- Tampa Museum of Art in Tampa
- Florida Museum of Photographic Arts in Tampa
- Glazer Children’s Museum in Tampa
- Museum of Science & Industry (Tampa)
- Henry B. Plant Museum in Tampa
- Tampa Bay History Center in Tampa

=== Libraries ===
The Tampa Public Library opened in 1917. The following notable libraries are part of the Hillsborough County Public Library Cooperative:

- Arthenia L. Joyner University Area Community Library
- Bloomingdale Regional Public Library
- Bruton Memorial Library
- C. Blythe Andrews Jr. Public Library
- Jan Kaminis Platt Regional Library
- John F. Germany Public Library
- Maureen B. Gauzza Public Library
- New Tampa Regional Library
- Port Tampa City Library
- Riverview Public Library
- Robert W. Saunders Sr. Public Library
- Seffner-Mango Branch Library
- Temple Terrace Public Library
- Thonotosassa Branch Library

== Local agencies ==
Several agencies provide law enforcement to the residents of Hillsborough County. They are all accredited and fully certified law enforcement agencies by the FDLE.

Hillsborough County Sheriff's Office

The HCSO is the largest local law enforcement agency in Hillsborough County. Headquartered in the Ybor City District of Tampa, it is responsible for law enforcement services in the unincorporated areas of the county. The county is divided into four districts, each containing multiple sectors identified with a letter (example: H – hotel sector, G – golf sector). The districts and sectors are cut to exclude areas covered by other local agencies.

The school district uses two agencies for security. The sheriff's office employs deputies assigned to various schools throughout the county. They, along with the Hillsborough County Public Schools Security Service officers, are known as school resource officers. Generally, deputies are assigned to schools outside of the incorporated cities and HCPSSS officers are assigned to schools within city limits. For extended services, other local agencies may be called in for support. Most crossing guards are employed in a unsworn capacity by the sheriff's office.

Plant City Police Department

Plant City maintains its own police department and is the third-largest police agency in terms of sworn officers following HCSO and TPD. The agency provides law-enforcement services to the residents of Plant City and occasionally provides backup to HCSO, answering calls close to their jurisdiction.

Seminole Police Department
The Seminole Indian Tribe operates the Hard Rock Hotel and Casino located in Tampa. The tribe has its own police department that operates on the grounds and at tribe events. They also respond to altercations that involves members of the tribe.

Tampa Airport Police Department
Tampa International Airport operates the Tampa Airport Police. They are a full-service agency providing services to the airport and surrounding areas where services to the airport take place.

Tampa Police Department

The TPD is the second-largest agency in the county. They serve the cities of Tampa, New Tampa, Port of Tampa, and other areas surrounding.

Temple Terrace Police Department
The city of Temple Terrace operates a police department with over 50 sworn officers.

University of South Florida Police Department
The USF Police Department has jurisdiction throughout the grounds of USF and other facilities operated by the university. They provide services to anyone located on the property and have full police authority granted by the Florida Department of Law Enforcement.

County jails and courthouse security
The sheriff's office operates the only two county jail facilities and one work release center. The Falkenburg Road Jail is the larger of the two jails. Orient Road Jail was the first in the nation to use open-booking areas.

With these being the only jails in the county, other than juvenile detention facilities, the work release center, or holding cells located at multiple police stations and sheriff offices, all local agencies transport persons being arrested to one of the county jails. The sheriff's office also provides security and protective services at the county courthouses in Tampa. With a majority of transportation of inmates to and from the courthouse being handled by the sheriff's office, the inmates remain in the custody of HCSO during the duration of the process until handed over to another jurisdiction, state, or federal custody.

Auxiliary and reserve officers
Some of these agencies also have auxiliary (reserve) deputies, officers, or troopers (here-in known as officer). They are volunteer (unpaid) citizens and generally sworn positions with a lesser certification that requires assignment to a fully certified officer to exercise. Some auxiliary officers are fully certified law-enforcement officers by the state and are permitted by the hosting agency to operate without assignment to a fully certified officer. The services they provide to the community are equal to that of a full-service officer and each agency sets how much service time is required to maintain status as an auxiliary officer.

As of March 2016 the following agencies have auxiliary or reserve deputy, officer, or trooper positions.

- FHP Auxiliary
- FWC Reserve
- HCSO Reserve
- TPD Auxiliary

Special Events
During special events, multiple agencies provide off-duty officers for security and support. They work with the agency within whose jurisdiction the event is taking place. For example, college football games held at Raymond James Stadium are served primarily by TPD and FHP. Other agencies may also support the event.

== Hillsborough County Fire Rescue ==
Hillsborough County Fire Rescue serves the unincorporated areas of Hillsborough County. Fire service began in the 1950s as an all-volunteer force consisting of about a dozen loosely associated community-based organizations. The first full-time career firefighters were hired in 1973. The department now has 1,019 career uniformed and support personnel who continue to set the pace in fire and emergency medical response, making it the fourth-largest department in the state. Since the 1997 consolidation of Hillsborough County Fire Rescue and Emergency Medical Services (EMS), the department has placed paramedics on each career, front-line apparatus. The department operates 35 ALS transport ambulances, 46 Engine Companies, 5 Truck Companies, 2 Heavy Rescue's, 1 Hazardous Incident Unit, 1 Fire Boat and 1 Rescue Boat. These units operate out of 44 Fire Rescue stations located strategically throughout Hillsborough County. As of summer 2021, 2 additional stations are being constructed to bring that number up to 46. As nearly 85% of the department's more than 137,000 (2021) emergency responses require some level of medical care, having paramedics assigned to each unit assures that the citizens of Hillsborough County are receiving rapid advanced life-support care.

Hillsborough County Fire Rescue and the Board of County Commissioners have implemented a plan to continue placing new fire rescue stations in areas where growth is occurring or gaps in coverage may exist. Fire Chief Dennis Jones leads a senior staff of two deputy chiefs (operations and administrative branches), the fire marshal, and the emergency manager. All fiscal functions, facilities maintenance and supply, apparatus/equipment procurement, emergency dispatch manager, personnel chief, and training chief are under the direction of the deputy chief of administration. The three Shift Commanders, as well as the Rescue Chief and the Special Operations Chief, report directly to the Deputy Chief of Operations. The Operations Chief is responsible for the overall response readiness of all front line personnel. The Emergency Manager oversees all Office of Emergency Management (OEM) planning and operations of the EOC.

=== Hillsborough County Fire Rescue Office of Emergency Management ===
The Office of Emergency Management is a division of Hillsborough County Fire Rescue that is directly responsible for planning and coordinating the evacuation and sheltering of all county residents in the event of a natural or manmade disaster. This agency is also responsible for planning, orchestrating and coordinating response actions and continuity of government in the aftermath of a major disaster. Preston Cook has been the Emergency Manager since 2011.

The Hurricane Evacuation Assessment Tool has been created to assist residents of Hillsborough County by providing evacuation and sheltering information in the event of a hurricane or other natural disaster. This interactive program was designed to assist the public in easily determining if they are in one of the five evacuation zones. It also provides information on shelters, hospitals, fire stations, and sandbag locations.

The Office of Emergency Management also provides information to the public on: Hurricane information, procedures for hazardous-materials spills, and flooding, tornado, wildfire, and terrorism preparedness.

== Transportation ==
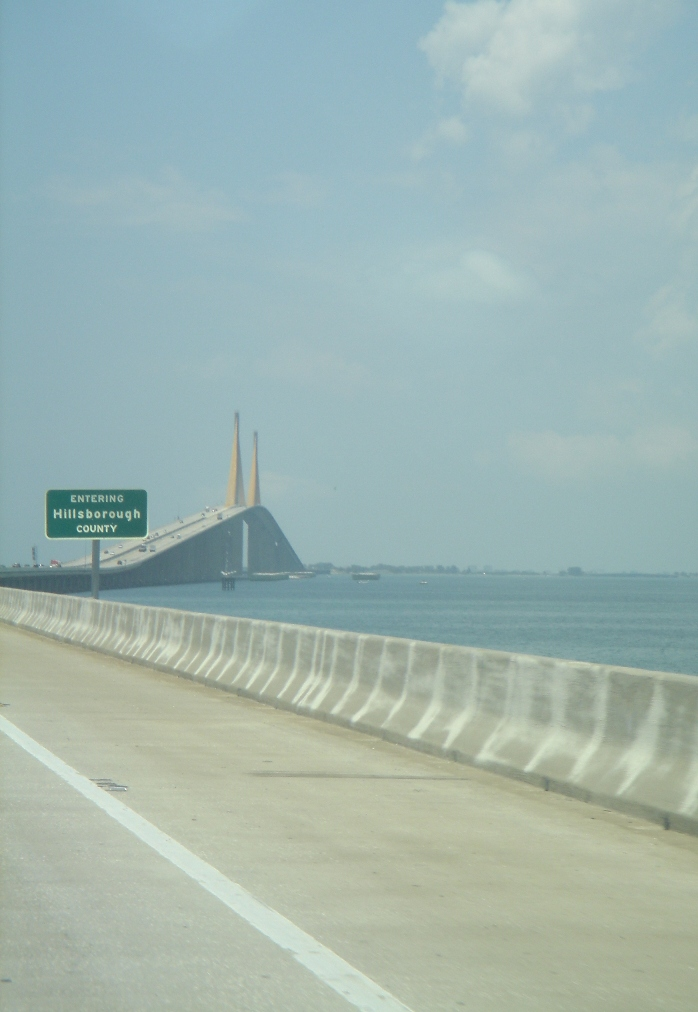
The Sunshine Skyway (I-275) connects Pinellas to Manatee Counties. The middle span is in Hillsborough County.

=== Public transportation ===
Hillsborough County is served by Hillsborough Area Regional Transit, also known as HART. They operate bus service as well as the TECO Line Streetcar.

==== Intercity ====
- Amtrak (Silver Star, Thruway bus service)
- Greyhound
- Flixbus
- RedCoach

=== Airports ===
The county's primary commercial aviation airport is Tampa International Airport in Tampa. Other important airports include the Tampa Executive Airport near Brandon, Peter O. Knight Airport near downtown Tampa, and the Plant City Airport near Plant City.

=== Major freeways and roadways ===
Interstate Highways

Interstate 4
Interstate 75
Interstate 275

U.S Routes

U.S. Route 41
U.S. Route 92
U.S. Route 301

State Routes

State Route 618
State Road 60
State Road 589
State Road 580

== Nationally protected areas ==
- Egmont Key National Wildlife Refuge

== Parks ==
- Alafia River Corridor Preserve
- Alderman's Ford Regional Park
- Balm-Boyette Scrub Nature Preserve
- Bell Creek Nature Preserve
- Blackwater Creek Preserve
- Brooker Creek Headwaters Nature Preserve
- Chito Branch Reserve
- Cockroach Bay Aquatic Preserve
- Edward Medard Park and Reservoir
- Fish Hawk Creek Preserve
- Hillsborough River State Park
- Lake Rogers Park
- Lettuce Lake Park
- Lithia Springs Regional Park
- Little Manatee River State Park
- Lower Green Swamp Preserve
- McKay Bay Nature Park
- Schultz Preserve
- Skyway Fishing Pier State Park
- Upper Tampa Bay Park
- Upper Tampa Bay Trail
- Wolf Branch Nature Preserve

== Communities ==
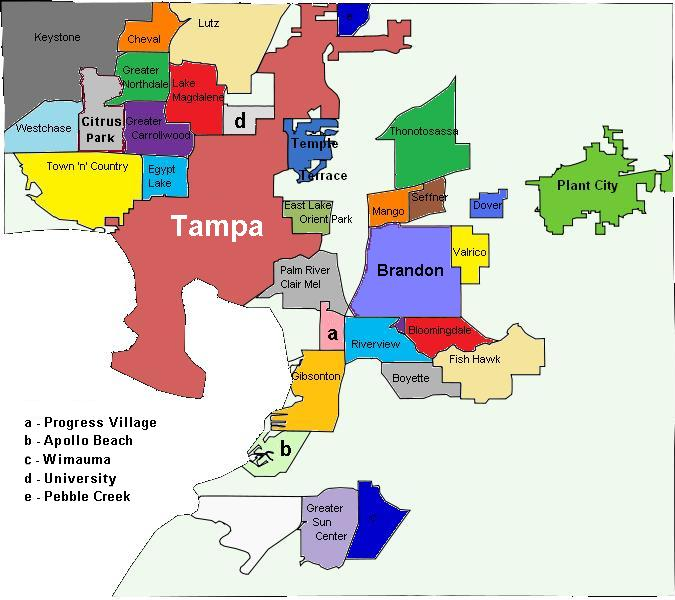
County subdivisions in Hillsborough County. Incorporated cities in bold; unincorporated CDPs in small font.

Despite its large population, there are only three incorporated places in Hillsborough County, all cities. Most of the area of the county is unincorporated and falls under the jurisdiction of the Hillsborough County board of commissioners. As of 2020, more than two thirds of the county's population lived in unincorporated areas.

=== Cities ===
Populations are as of the 2020 census.

- Tampa – 384,959
- Plant City – 39,764
- Temple Terrace – 26,690

=== Census-designated places ===
- Apollo Beach
- Balm
- Bloomingdale
- Brandon
- Carrollwood
- Cheval
- Citrus Park
- Dover
- East Lake-Orient Park
- Egypt Lake-Leto
- Fish Hawk
- Gibsonton
- Keystone
- Lake Magdalene
- Lutz
- Mango
- Northdale
- Odessa
- Palm River-Clair Mel
- Pebble Creek
- Progress Village
- Riverview
- Ruskin
- Seffner
- Sun City Center
- Thonotosassa
- Town 'n' Country
- University
- Valrico
- Westchase
- Wimauma

=== Unincorporated communities ===
- Adamsville
- Alafia
- Antioch
- Bay Crest Park
- Boyette (former CDP, now part of Riverview)
- Clair-Mel City
- Del Rio
- Durant
- East Lake
- East Tampa
- Egypt Lake
- Fort Lonesome
- Gulf City
- Hopewell
- Keysville
- Knights
- Lake Fern
- Leto
- Limona
- Lithia
- Nowatney
- Orient Park
- Palma Ceia
- Palm River
- Picnic
- Pinecrest
- Port Sutton
- Rattlesnake
- Remlap
- Rocky Creek
- Snows Corner
- Sulphur Springs
- Sun City
- Sweetwater Creek
- Sydney
- Trapnell
- Turkey Creek

=== Historic towns ===
- Bullfrog Corner
- Bone Valley
- Branchton
- Callsville
- Chataocolea
- Chicora
- Clarkwild
- Coronet
- Cork (now Dover, not to be confused with two other places named Cork)
- Cork (now Plant City)
- Cosme
- Dillon
- Diston
- Drew Park, absorbed by Tampa
- East Cove
- Edeson
- Flora
- Fort Brooke
- Fort Foster
- Fort Sullivan
- Garden City
- Gary
- Gulf City
- Harney
- Hillsboro
- Ichipucksassa, aka Ichepucksassa, Hitchipucksassa (now Plant City)
- Idlewild Park
- Jackson Springs
- Keystone Park
- Knights Station
- Knowles
- Lake Fern
- Lighthall
- Lillibridge
- Magdalene
- Magnolia
- Mangrove Point
- Manhattan (absorbed by Tampa)
- Marvinia
- Midway
- Mullins City
- Nicholls
- Oliphant
- Orient
- Peck
- Pelot
- Peru
- Prairie
- Riverhead
- Rocky Point
- Sparkman
- Stemper
- St Helena
- Trapnell (absorbed by Plant City)
- Welcome
- Weldon
- Willow
- Youmans
- Ybor City

== See also ==
- Hillsborough County Sheriff's Office
- Hillsborough County Public Schools
- National Register of Historic Places listings in Hillsborough County, Florida
- USS Hillsborough County (LST-827)
- Upper Tampa Bay Park
- List of schools in Hillsborough County, Florida
- List of counties in Florida
- List of tallest buildings in Tampa
