= Environmental Lands Acquisition and Protection Program =

Environmental Lands Acquisition and Protection Program abbreviated as ELAPP is a taxpayer funded land acquisition and conservation strategy in Hillsborough County, Florida. The program began in January 1987 when the Hillsborough County Commissioners approved ordinance with $21 million in acquisition funding over four years. In 1990 voters approved a 20-year bond issuance for additional land purchases. Again in November 2008 another bond program was approved by voters for up to $200 million. In the 20 years up to 2008, more than 50 land purchases had been made including several in the Hillsborough River watershed. Approximately $200 million had been spent with an estimated 38 percent coming from outside sources.

== Land acquisitions ==
- Cypress Creek Preserve, 2,547 acres (in Pasco County)
- Temple Terrace Riverfront Park, 118-acre

== See also ==
- Environmentally Endangered Lands Programs
