= Bloomingdale Regional Public Library =

Library in Valrico, Florida, U.S.

Coordinates: 27.8944°N 82.2524°W

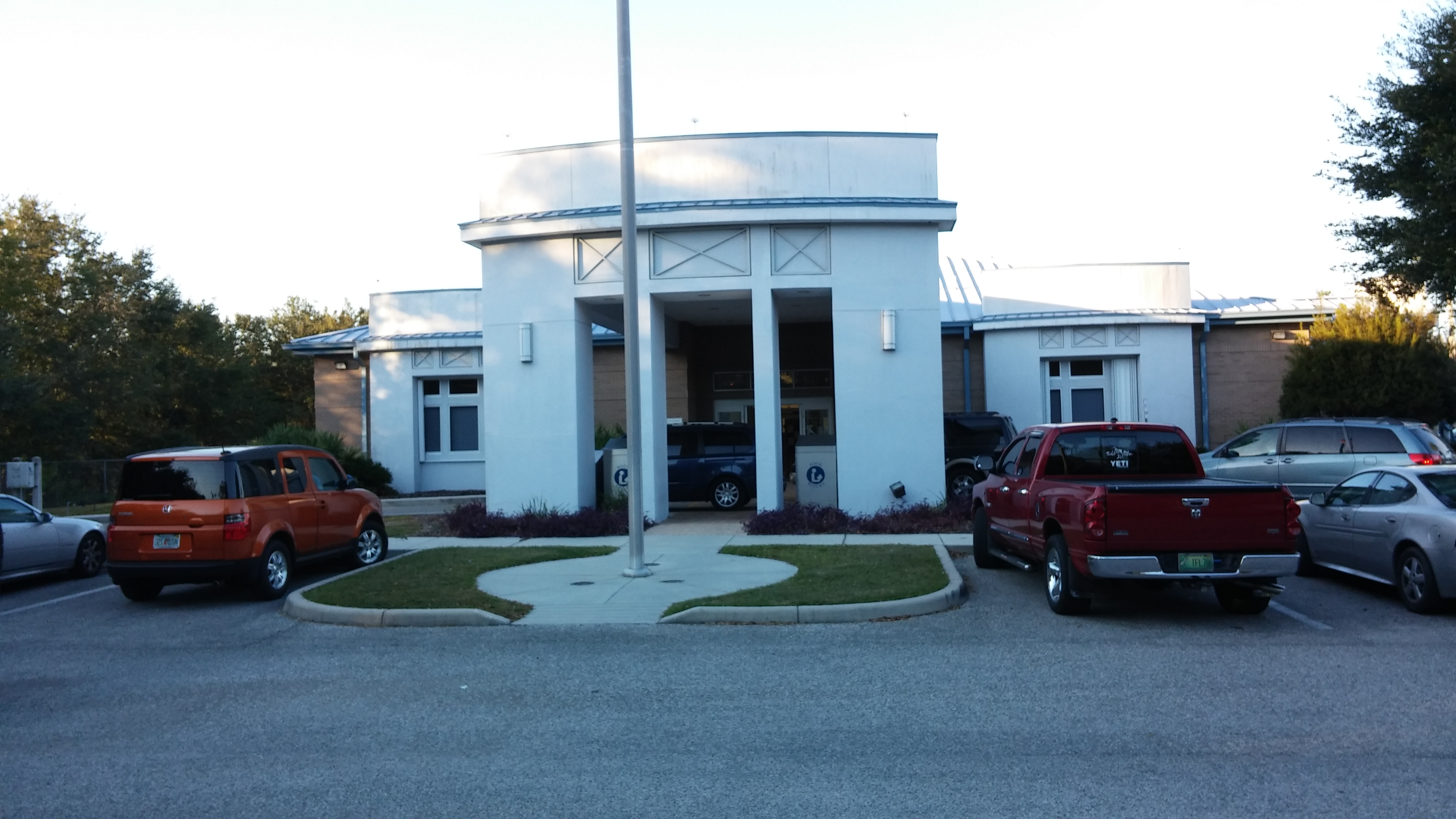
- Front view
- Location: 1906 Bloomingdale Ave, Valrico, FL 33596
- Established: February 10, 2005

Other information
- Website: http://www.hcplc.org/hcplc/locations/bdl/

The Bloomingdale Regional Library is located at 1906 Bloomingdale Avenue, Valrico, Florida, United States.

== History ==
The library was originally designed to lessen patron traffic at the Brandon Regional Library, which was the busiest library in the Tampa–Hillsborough County Public Library System, at the beginning of the 21st century.In its early stages of development, the Bloomingdale Library was often referred to as the South Brandon Library because it was expected to serve people in the FishHawk, Bloomingdale, Valrico, and Lithia areas.

Though several sites were proposed for the creation of the library, the Hillsborough County Commissioners narrowed down their selection to two locations. One was across the street from Lithia Springs Elementary School on Lithia Pinecrest Road, while the other was next to Bloomingdale High School on Bloomingdale Avenue. Though there were concerns regarding possible traffic congestion on Bloomingdale Avenue, the commissioners ultimately chose the latter. This site was attractive for cost-saving reasons, as a member of the McLean family offered to discount the acreage with an additional free acre.

Proposed blueprints for the library allowed for 15,000 square feet, with the possibility of adding another 10,000 later. The space included a 3,770 square foot reading room, a 1,150 square foot children's room, and a 940 square foot community collaboration room. Additional space was dedicated to meeting rooms and reading areas. With a holding of 53,000 books upon its day of opening, as well as thirty-five internet-accessible computers and the inclusion of free WI-fi, the Bloomingdale Library cost a total $4.5 million.

The library had a soft opening on February 7, 2005, and officially started service on February 10.

Within a few months of opening, the Bloomingdale Library became the new home of the Greater Brandon Genealogy Society. The library specifically dedicated a genealogical research room with five computers that were directly linked to the John F. Germany Public Library's genealogical websites. In return for the genealogical center, the Greater Brandon Genealogy society offered to provide free tutoring for anyone interested in uncovering his or her family background. The genealogical center at Bloomingdale was the second in the county, with the John F. Germany acting as the only other center at the time of the former's creation.

The Bloomingdale Library was expanded by an additional 10,000 square feet in 2013, thereby making it a regional library. This additional space was geared towards creating a larger children's room, community rooms, seating for studying, a larger Friends of the Library bookstore, and areas for technology and teen activities. A new vending cafe for patrons was also part of the $2.1 million expansion.

In the year before the expansion, the library circulated over 660,000 books and other multimedia.

The library took advantage of federal funding to purchase an electric charging station for electric cars. Cooking oil recycling stations are available at some library locations countywide.

== Friends of the Library ==
The Friends of the Library is a nonprofit organization of citizens and volunteers who support the library and its community. They operate through their Book Ends Bookstore located in the library's lobby, which accepts donations of new or used books. The money raised by donors and the bookstore goes towards funding special events, programs such as the Life Story Writing Workshop, and other library operations.

== Library art ==
The Bloomingdale Regional Library has a permanent display of colorful glass art created by local artist Lisa Vogt. One piece is located above the main entrance to the library, and there other is in the children's room.

Alongside the public art displays within the library itself, for every donor who contributed to the Friends during the opening of the new library in 2005, Vogt created a fused-glass heart to be placed in the "Love Your Library Hearts Wall" in the lobby. Her technique uses fused or dichroic glass, which is done through thin layers of metal oxides melted onto a piece of glass, creating numerous colors.

== Technology and accessibility information ==
Common to all branches in the Tampa–Hillsborough County Public Library System, the library offers the following technology services:

Computers are free to use; patrons log on using their library card number. All computers come with preinstalled software, such as Microsoft Office, Adobe Photoshop, Adobe Premiere, DVD burning software, Windows media player, and Netsmartz Internet safety software.

All of the public computers have the ability to print, with wireless printing and photocopying also available.

Scanning and faxing service are also offered.

Bloomingdale Regional Library offers the following assistive technology for patrons who need assistance:

- JAWS is screen reader and navigation software compatible with Microsoft Office and web browsers.
- Dragon Speak reads aloud what is on the computer.
- ZoomText enlarges print on the computer screen.
- Keys-U-See keyboards have large print for the visually impaired.

== Rape incident ==
On the night of April 24, 2008, 18-year old Queena Vuong was returning books at the library when she was raped and beaten by 16-year-old Kendrick Morris. She suffered a skull fracture and numerous strokes from strangulation during the beating, leaving her paralyzed and blind. Morris was arrested when he returned to the library the next day. It was also discovered that he was also wanted for the rape of an elderly woman at a Clair-Mel day care center in 2007. In 2011, Morris was sentenced to 65 years in prison for the two charges; as he was a minor when he committed the crimes, he was ineligible for the life sentence. In March 2017, he was retried and sentenced to life in prison.
