= William Fishbaugh =

William Fishbaugh or Fishbough may refer to:

- William Fishbaugh, defender of the Alamo
- William A. Fishbaugh (1873–1950), American commercial photographer
- William Fishbough, scribe of Andrew Jackson Davis

== See also ==
- William Fishbourn, mayor of Philadelphia
