= Arthenia L. Joyner University Area Community Library =

Coordinates: 28.071938°N 82.432725°W

The Arthenia L. Joyner University Area Community Library is a member of the Tampa–Hillsborough County Public Library System (THPL) and the Hillsborough County Public Library Cooperative (HCPLC). It is a 15,000 square foot facility located adjacent to Muller Elementary Magnet School on 13619 North 22nd St. In addition to serving as a public library, the location also serves a partnership library with the Hillsborough County Public School system. The library doubles as a media center for the Mueller Elementary Magnet School during school hours and as a public library during all operating hours. In addition to books, the library offers a variety of meeting spaces, computers, technology instruction, literacy and family events.

== History ==
First conceived in 1993, the Arthenia L. Joyner University Area Community Library was finally adopted into a master plan in 1995 by Hillsborough County Commissioner Victor Crist. In 2002, the library was placed on the "unfunded list" for several years. The $9.3 - million project was finally funded by the Hillsborough County Board of County Commissioners and a grant from the Florida Department of State, Division of Library Services and the State of Florida. The new library was constructed after a neighborhood needs assessment was performed, indicating that 1 in 5 members of the community did not have their own transportation. Meaning that many had to take a bus to either the North Tampa Branch Library or Temple Terrace Public Library.

The 15,000 square foot Arthenia L. Joyner University Area Community Library was dedicated and opened to the public on March 26, 2018 during a ribbon-cutting ceremony. It was named to honor Arthenia Joyner, a former Florida state senator and long-time civil rights advocate. Senator Joyner has tirelessly advocated for her community, especially for women and minorities.

== Partnership ==
The Arthenia L. Joyner University Area Community Library serves as a partnership library with Mueller Elementary Magnet School. The library serves as a public library during its hours of operation and as a media center for Mueller Elementary during school hours. A wall with double doors separates the media center and main library until the school closes for the day. It remains open during spring break hours.

== Design ==
The outer walls of the Arthenia L. Joyner University Area Community Library are similar to others as it is constructed out of bricks. Inside, it contains LED lighting, a mosaic art installation on the floor and furnishing and designs to foster group collaborations as well as an individual quiet reading time. The library also has USB connections for electronic devices including laptops and phones and has sixteen public use computers, in addition to a laptop lending station. A maker space is also available for technology demonstrations and their meeting room will serve over 50 attendees.

On November 20, 2018, the library was recognized as a top five library in the Library Journal 2018 Year in Architecture - Community & Culture Space.

== Services ==
- Library Collection
  - Nearly 14,000 books, audio books, magazines, music CDs and DVDs
- Maker space
- Meeting spaces
- Public Computers
- Wireless Internet
- Early literacy assistant
- Job resources
- Family events
- Bright Spot
  - Ceramic tile public art installation created by a local artist
- Assistive Technology
- WEDU PBS Phyllis L. Ensign Library Corner
- Self-Checkout
- Snack and Beverage Vending
- 24/7 Book drop access
- Photocopiers
- Printing
