= Riverview Library =

Riverview Library may refer to:

- Riverview Branch Library, a Carnegie library in Saint Paul, Minnesota
- Riverview Public Library, a library in Hillsborough County, Florida
