= West Tampa Free Public Library =

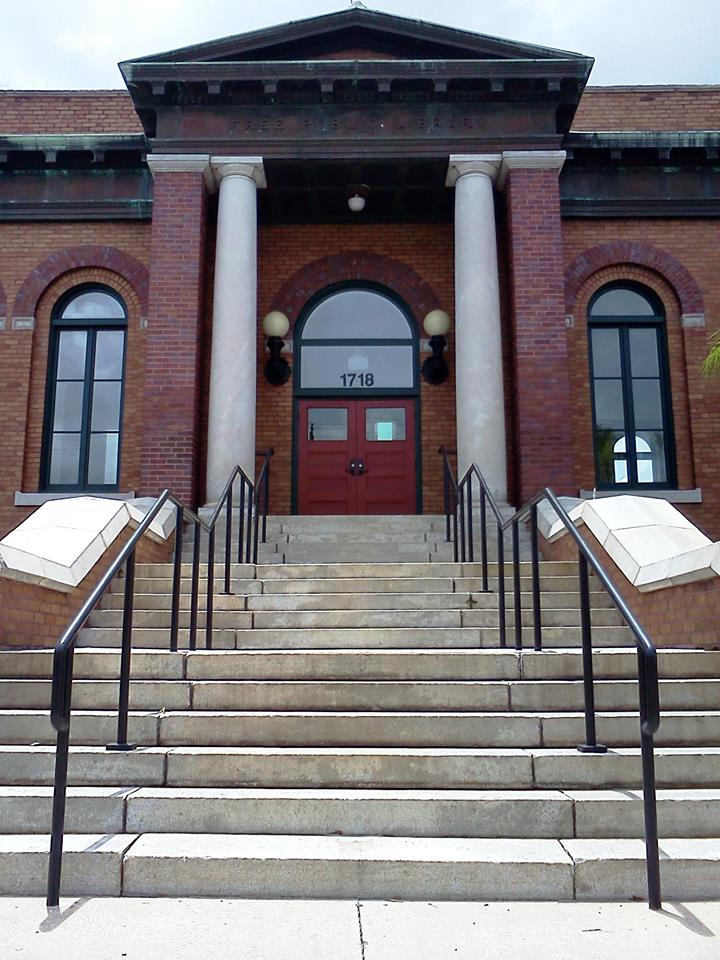

General information
- Architectural style: Neoclassical Revivalist
- Location: 2312 W. Union St., Tampa, Florida
- Coordinates: 27.957741°N 82.483256°W
- Opened: 1914; 112 years ago
- Renovated: 2004; 22 years ago

Website
- http://www.hcplc.org/hcplc/locations/wtp/

The West Tampa Free Public Library, more recently the West Tampa Branch Library, is a historic building in the West Tampa National Historic District in Tampa, Florida. It was the first public library in Hillsborough County, Florida, when it opened on Main and Howard Avenue in 1914. The library is a historic link between the establishment of the City of West Tampa, the Cigar industry, and Latin and African-American communities. West Tampa was incorporated on May 18, 1895, with its population being nearly 3,000 and is considered one of Tampa's earliest suburban towns. In the period from 1900 to 1920, West Tampa saw enormous growth when its cigar factories were flourishing and commercial structures were being erected rapidly. It was Hillsborough County's only free public library until 1917. Construction of the Neoclassical revivalist style brick building was funded with a $17,500 grant from Andrew Carnegie. Residents voted in a special election to accept the donation and a yearly tax to pay for the library's operating costs. The vote was 352 to 1. Land for the library was donated by cigar factory owner Angel Cuesta. As a result of the high number of cigar factories in the area, the library had a Spanish-language reading section that cigar factory workers used frequently. English, Spanish, and Italian were spoken in the library because of West Tampa's ethnic diversity at that time. It is one of eleven Carnegie libraries built in Florida. The structure has been listed on the National Register Listing since 1983 and as a Local Historic Designation since 1988.

The library is now a branch of the Tampa-Hillsborough County Public Library System. Of the two Carnegie Libraries that originally opened in the Tampa area, the West Tampa Branch Library is the only one that is still open to the public. The library celebrated its centennial in January 2014.

== Restoration and expansion ==
In 2004, the library completed a major renovation and expansion. This renovation made the historic library more accessible to everyone in the community and to allow for the addition of library materials and technology. The main floor became a second floor meeting room. An extension of 5,000 square feet was added to the back of the building, and what was once the basement level became the library's main reading room. It is now used as the West Tampa Branch Library, located at 2312 West Union Street. Land for the library building was donated by cigar factory owner Angel Cuesta. Decorations include stained glass and a triptych oil painting on canvas by artist Ferdie Pacheco titled Coming to Work, The Cigar Factory, Main Intersection is exhibited in the library's main foyer and a 2003 acrylic painting by Synthia St. James titled Kaleidoscope is located in the main reading room. In 2011, in preparation for the library's 100th anniversary, the library took part in the Library History Roadshow.

== Services ==
In addition to books, magazines, DVDs, music CDs, and audiobooks, the library also offers meeting rooms, public use internet computers, access to electronic databases & eBooks, and a used book store. As with all libraries in the Tampa-Hillsborough County Public Library system, the West Tampa Branch Library also offers printers, photocopiers, scanners, public fax service, free wi-fi, and assistive technology.

== Friends of the Library ==
The West Tampa Branch Library is served by the Ada T. Payne Friends of the Urban Libraries group, a volunteer group that also serves the Robert W. Saunders Sr. Public Library and the C. Blythe Andrews Jr. Public Library. A Friends of the Library bookstore is located on site. Proceeds from book sales are used to fund programs for children, teens and adults and to support other library activities.
