= Jan Kaminis Platt Regional Library =

Library in United States of America

- 27°54′26″N 82°31′03″W
- Location: 3910 S. Manhattan Ave., Tampa, Florida 33611, United States
- Established: 2000
- Branch of: Tampa-Hillsborough County Public Library System

Other information
- Website: hcplc.org/locations/jan-kaminis-platt

The Jan Kaminis Platt Regional Library is part of the Tampa-Hillsborough County Public Library System (THPL), as well as a member of the Hillsborough County Public Library Cooperative (HCPLC). The library is a 25,000 sq. ft. facility located at 3910 S. Manhattan Ave. in Tampa, Florida. The library provides books, magazines, DVDs, music, and internet access, as well as programs and activities, and a drive-thru window for check out and return of materials. In December 2018 the library underwent an extensive renovation which enclosed the children's area and expanded the number of meeting and study rooms to eight.

== Jan Kaminis Platt ==
Initially to be called the Interbay Regional Library, the library was named in honor of Jan Kaminis Platt, who served as a former Hillsborough County Commissioner and member of the Tampa City Council. She served on numerous community boards including the Environmental Protection Commission, the Hospital and Welfare Board, the Hillsborough County Hospital Authority, the Sports Authority, the Arts Council, the Performing Arts Center Board, the Florida Aquarium, and the Florida Council on Aging. Platt was added to the American Library Association's "Freedom to Read Honor Roll" and received the "Best Friend of the Year" award from the Friends of the Library of Hillsborough County in 1999.

Jan Platt led the effort to create a county preservation program that manages more than 61,000 acres of environmentally sensitive lands, increased funding for libraries and successfully fought to pass an ordinance outlawing discrimination based on sexual orientation. She led efforts to preserve the piers of the old Sunshine Skyway bridge and the historic gun batteries at Egmont Key. In 2013, the County Commission voted unanimously to rename its popular Environmental Lands Acquisition and Protection Program in her honor.

Jan Kaminis Platt died on November 3, 2017. Thanks to the Friends of the Jan Platt Library, a display case honoring Jan Platt's service and dedication to community is prominently featured at the entrance of the library's main reading room.

On September 21, 2019, the "Jan Platt Day" event was held at her namesake library and featured activities for all ages, including an author talk from best-seller Tim Dorsey. A highlight video of the day's events can be viewed on youtube.

== History ==
Designed to ease overcrowding at the Peninsular Branch Library (Now the Charles J. Fendig Public Library), The Jan Kaminis Platt Regional Library was dedicated and opened to the public on December 11, 2000.

The library is the third and final facility paid for primarily by a special $10 million fund designated within the Special Library Taxing District approved by the Board of County Commissioners in September 1993. $4.2 million of the library's construction cost came from this fund. A $500,000 grant from the State of Florida's Division of Library and Information Services also helped finance the facility that was designed by the architectural firm of Gee & Jensen.

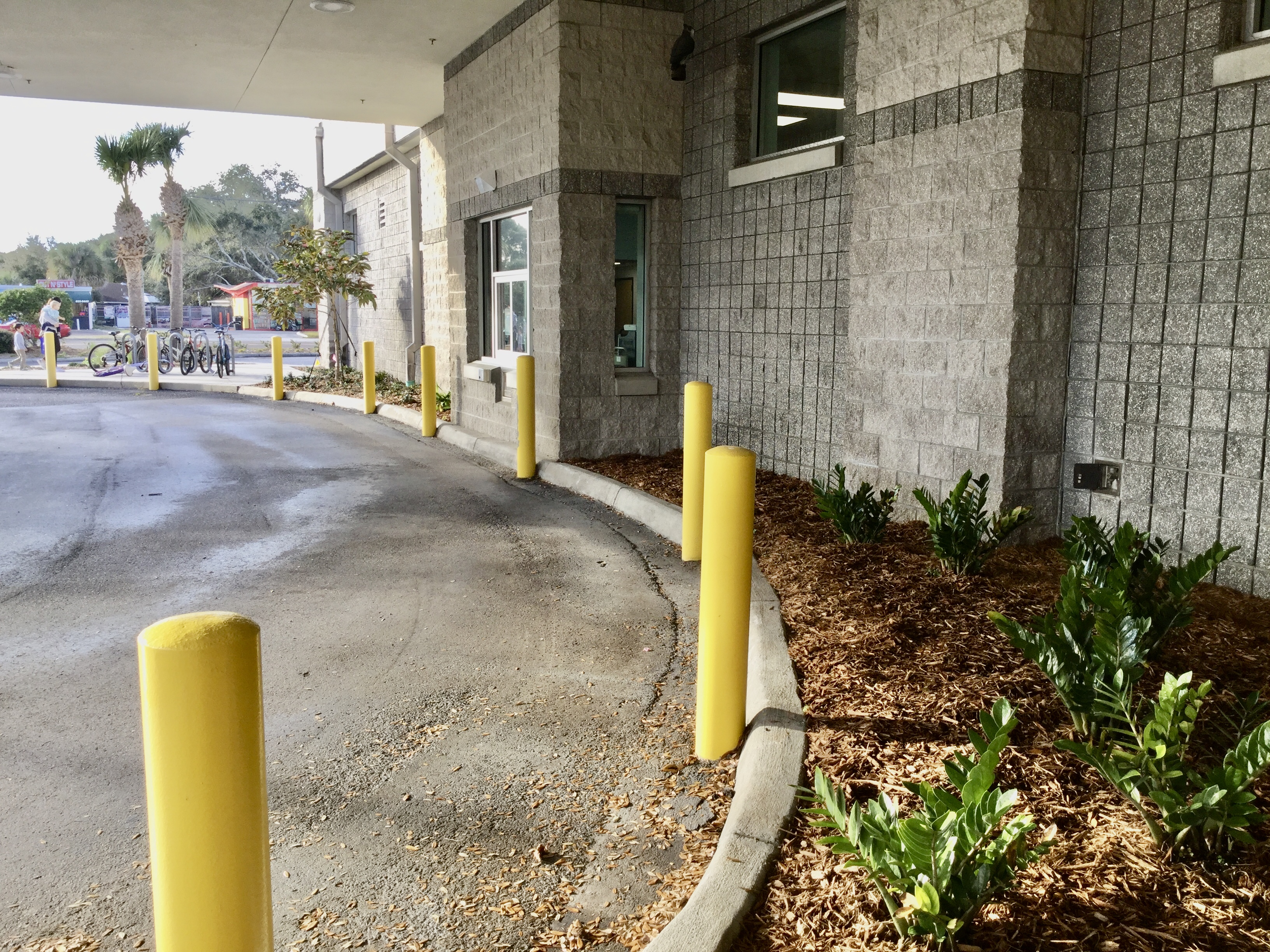
Library drive through for returns and pickups.

The Jan Kaminis Platt Library was the first in the Tampa-Hillsborough County Library System to have a drive-thru window. It was also the first library in the county that used colored paint on its walls.

In June 2002, the library became the first in the county with a coffee and snack bar called Bookends Café run and staffed by the owners of Ja Vahz on El Prado Boulevard. The library would receive 4 percent of the cafe's gross revenue above $2,000 a month. While the library café has since closed, Ja Vahz is still open for business down the street.

The library also housed Hillsborough County's Talking Book Library from 2000 until 2013 when it relocated to the building next door, the library system’s Technical Services Center.

== Services ==
- U.S. Passport Services
- Assistive Technologies
- Free WiFi
- Internet Access
- Public Meeting Rooms
- Photocopiers
- Public FAX
- Snack and Beverage Vending
- Wireless Printing
- Drive-thru return
- 24/7 bookdrop

== Public Art ==
The distinctive collection of art at the Jan Kaminis Platt Regional Library enhances the architectural design of the building. Featured throughout the interior is an eclectic collection of works on paper and canvas, stained glass, and metal sculpture by a diverse group of local, regional, national, and international award-winning artists. At the entry to the children's section are a panther portico and a manatee bench, hand-carved by New Hampshire wood artist Jeffrey Cooper. Cooper has entitled the archway "Olde Port Portico". Above the service desk hangs a large copper and stainless steel fish net sculpture entitled "Pescados" by Plant City, FL artist Monica Naugle. The back wall of the library is adorned with colorful stained glass windows by St. Petersberg, FL artist Lenn Neff.

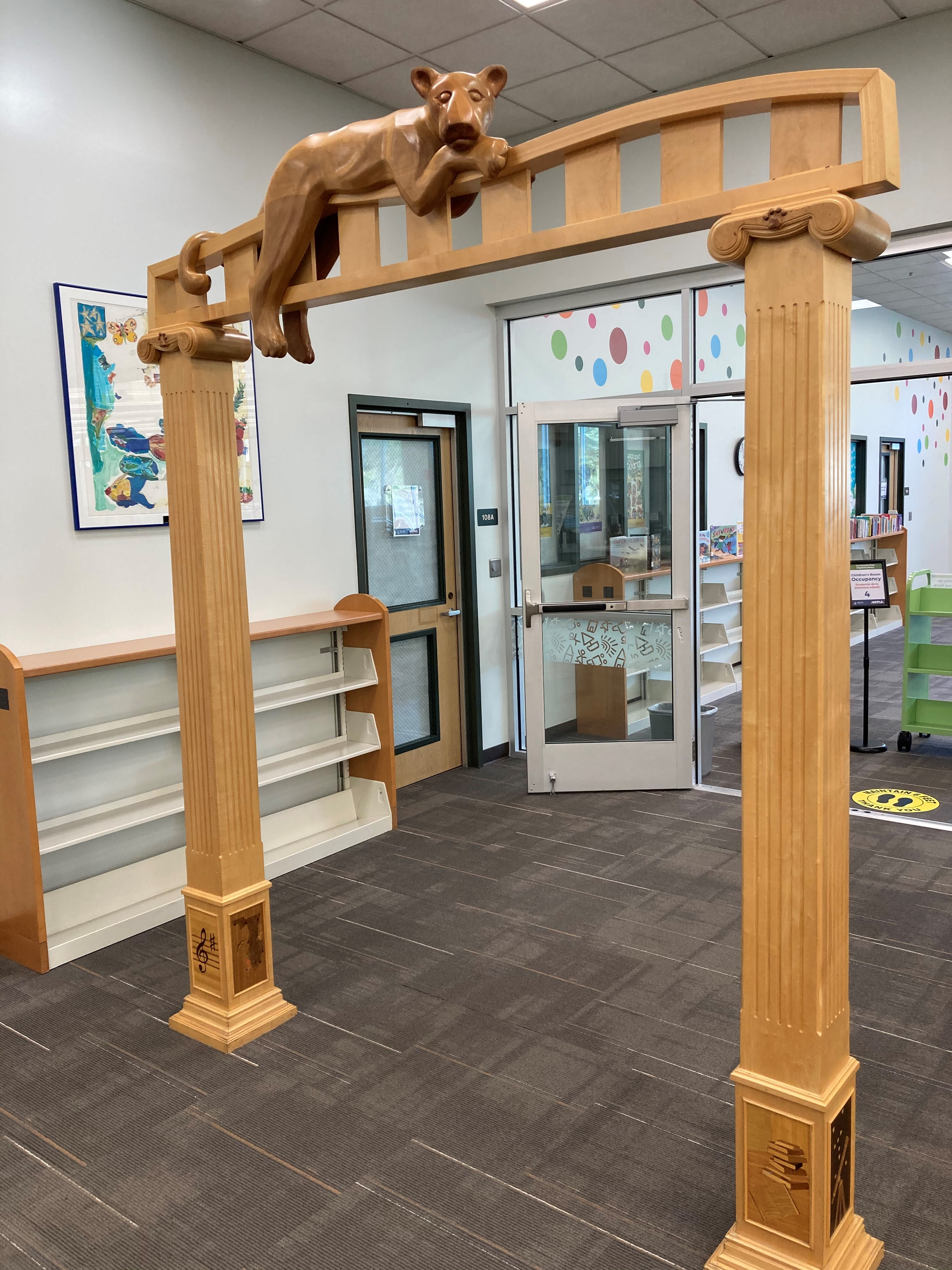
"Olde Port Portico" by Jeffrey Cooper

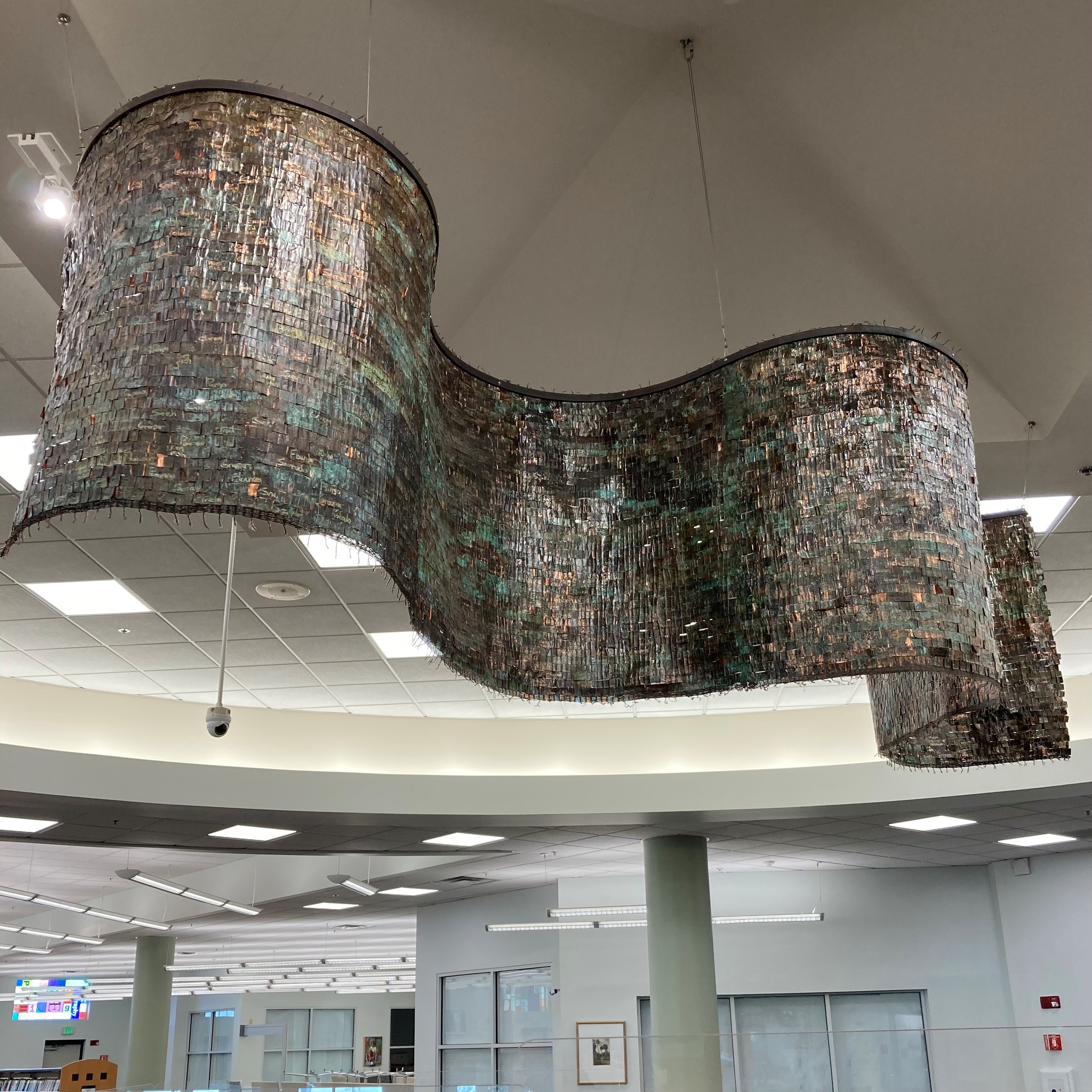
"Pescados" by Monica Naugle
