= William A. Fishbaugh =

American photographer (1873–1950)

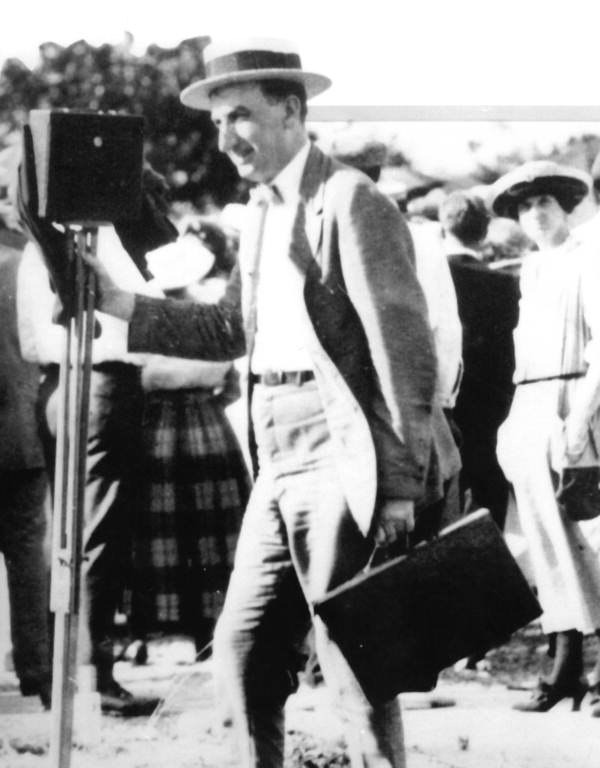
- Photographer William A. Fishbaugh in Dade County, Florida. c. 1920
- Born: June 20, 1873
- Died: November 3, 1950 (aged 77)
- Known for: Photography
- Spouse: Alice Greene

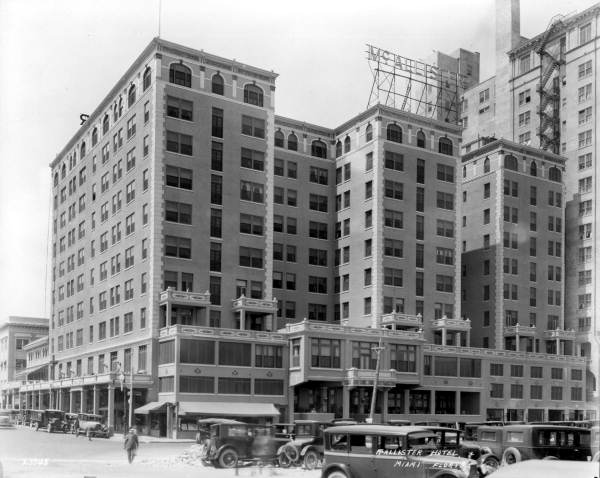
Fishbaugh's architectural photograph of the McAllister Hotel in Miami, Florida. March 10, 1926

William A. Fishbaugh (June 20, 1873 – November 3, 1950) was an American commercial photographer who worked in the Miami, Florida area during its early twentieth century development boom.

Fishbaugh married Alice E. Greene of Belvidere, New Jersey on October 25, 1913.

== Career ==
While working in South Africa as a mounted police officer in 1900, Fishbaugh began his photography career. His moderate duties as police officer allowed him to take photographs of the other officers and their environment, which he was able to sell. He continued to make a living with this photography business in the Philippines during the Spanish–American War. In 1910, he moved to Tampa where he began photographing buildings. He once remarked, retrospectively, "It's the best kind of photography. ... A building is there for everyone to see as he can. There's no vanity in a building."

Fishbaugh operated a commercial photography studio at 506 Franklin Street in Tampa, Florida for about ten years. Among his clients were Tampa Electric Company, Rhodes-Pearce-Mahoney furniture store, Tampa Gas Company, and Beckwith-Wilson Company. As a commercial photographer, he competed directly with the Burgert Brothers company. In 1917, before moving to Miami, Fishbaugh sold his business and negatives to the Burgert Brothers. A historical archive of Burgert's photographs include some created by Fishbaugh.

Land developer George E. Merrick, who led the planning and development of Coral Gables, Florida during the Florida land boom of the 1920s commissioned Fishbaugh's photography. Fishbaugh created a promotional marketing brochure featuring Fishbaugh's photographs of palm trees with backgrounds of clouds. According to Fishbaugh, these "serene" images "literally wowed them up north".

== Legacy ==
Fishbaugh's architectural photographs have been instrumental in documenting the early real estate development boom in Florida. Many of his photographs were displayed in George Merrick's offices across the United States. In 1998, a selection of his work was displayed at the Coral Gables City Hall. These vintage photographs included recognizable subjects such as the Venetian Pool, the La Palma Building and the Biltmore Hotel.
