= Tampa–Hillsborough County Public Library System =

Public library system in Florida

Tampa-Hillsborough County Public Library System
- Location: 102 E. 7th Ave., Tampa, Florida, 33602
- Established: 1905
- Branches: 33

Other information
- Director: Andrew S. Breidenbaugh
- Employees: 162
- Parent organization: Hillsborough County Public Library Cooperative; Tampa Bay Library Consortium
- Website: https://hcplc.org/thpl

The Tampa–Hillsborough County Public Library System (THPL) is a public library system based in Hillsborough County, Florida, United States. The THPL is a department of the Hillsborough County government.

There are 33 branches of the Hillsborough County Public Library Cooperative. The library system circulates 3.5 million physical items and 2.3 million virtual items annually. It is part of two larger library networks, the Tampa Bay Library Consortium, and the Hillsborough County Public Library Cooperative, which includes Temple Terrace Public Library in Temple Terrace, and Bruton Memorial Library in Plant City.

== History ==
=== Tampa Public Library System (1912–1925) ===
The Old Tampa Free Public Library was the first library in Hillsborough County. It was funded by a grant given to the city on October 29, 1912. The library originally opened on April 27, 1917. That same year, the city of West Tampa also expressed interest in establishing a public library and was awarded a grant of $17,500 to fund the construction. West Tampa opened their library at 1718 North Howard Avenue. The main entrance is now located at 2312 West Union Street.

By 1925, Tampa's public library network had four branches. The City of Tampa annexed West Tampa that year and absorbed their library, the West Tampa Free Public Library (previously a stand-alone entity), into the library system.

=== Tampa–Hillsborough County Public Library System (1925–present) ===
As Hillsborough County continued to grow throughout the 20th century, the need for libraries further away increased. In 1961, the City of Tampa and Hillsborough County contractually consolidated their libraries and (with the exception of Temple Terrace and Bruton Memorial, which remain separate agencies) the Tampa–Hillsborough County Public Library System was born. On September 1, 1999, the Hillsborough County Public Library Cooperative (HCPLC) was first introduced as a way for patrons to access materials and programs from other libraries in the library system.

A 2013 study done by the Florida Department of State's Division of Library and Information Services determined that Florida libraries return $10.18 in value to the community for every dollar it spends.

Prior to the 1984 fiscal year, control of the Tampa-Hillsborough County Public Library system was a contentious split between the County and the City of Tampa. In 1981 a controversy arose surrounding sex education books that were housed in the children's section. The City Council, not the county, decided the solution was to move the books to the adult section. This led to the creation of a committee that aimed to devise a plan to clearly define which entity, city or county, would have control of the libraries. Two plans came about, one proposed by the City Council that "recommended the creation of a seven member council under control of the mayor." The other recommendation was from the County Commission, which called for a "14-member library board of directors with eight members appointed by the County Commission and six members appointed by the city." Neither plan was adopted, as arguments from each side led to an impasse; some of the strongest objections against full county control came from Mayor Martinez, who stated that such an idea was "unacceptable to the citizens of Tampa who have invested millions of dollars over many years to develop the system. The county had no library system, the city did." However, 56 percent of the funding for the libraries' budget was provided by the County Commission and 44 percent by the City Council.

Finally, on October 1, 1984, Florida House Bill Number 1022 was adopted. This bill officially enlarged the county library system to include the City of Tampa, and created the Public Library Board, and provided funding for the system. Section 4 of House Bill 1022 designated that the Public Library Board would be composed of "twelve residents of Hillsborough County, three from each of the four county single-member districts appointed by the Board of County Commissioners of Hillsborough County for staggered terms of three years; and they shall serve at the pleasure of the County Commission. A majority of the membership of the Public Library Board shall constitute a quorum. This Board may make and adopt such by-laws, rules and regulations for its own guidance and for the government of the Public Library System as it may deem expedient and not inconsistent with law."

== Services ==
Services provided by the THPL include internet access, public meeting room spaces, interlibrary loans, a Bookmobile, a Cybermobile for Spanish speakers, technology classes, adult literacy programs, and downloadable eBooks. Drive-through windows for returns and hold pick-ups are located at the Jimmie B. Keel and the Jan Kaminis Platt Regional Libraries.

In 2017, THPL introduced the new HAAL Pass, which gives access to certain library resources to all students in the Hillsborough County Public Schools System. Students use their student ID number to use different online databases, borrow up to three physical items and read eBooks.

On January 1, 2018, the library cooperative became one of the largest in the country to go fine-free. Overdue fees for borrowed materials were eliminated with the implementation of the "Just Bring It Back" initiative.

=== The Hive ===
The Hive is a makerspace which offers a variety of services to the patrons of the Tampa-Hillsborough library system. A library card from Hillsborough County is needed to make use of the services. Services for The Hive can be found at John F. Germany Public Library, Bloomingdale Regional Public Library, Jan Kaminis Platt Regional Library, Jimmie B. Keel Regional Library, New Tampa Regional Library, Seminole Heights Branch Library, SouthShore Regional Library, Town 'N Country Regional Public Library, and Upper Tampa Bay Regional Public Library.

=== Cybermobile ===
Cybermobile is a bus offering Spanish library materials, access to the Internet, and other library programs. The Cybermobile of the Tampa–Hillsborough County Public Library System was dedicated on May 11, 2006.

=== Library2Go ===
Library2Go (formerly the Bookmobile) is a part of the Hillsborough County Public Library Cooperative. It provides library services to residents who may not be able to visit a library branch. The mobile program provides a variety of services, including library card registration, placing holds on library material, picking up requested materials, checking out a selection of material formats, returning items, and accessing computers and the internet. Library2Go makes stops at 33 different locations across the Tampa area on Mondays-Thursdays.

== Special collections ==
The Hillsborough County Public Library System possesses many collections unique to the cultural heritage of Tampa Bay. The Burgert Brothers Photographic Collection shows the social and residential growth of Florida from the late 1800s to the early 1960s. The images highlight the unique parts of Tampa, from the sponge fisherman and cigar cities to the strawberry farms and tourists. The physical collection is located at the John F. Germany branch, but the images are available online.

Along with the Burgert Brothers Photographic Collection, the library system also possesses the Hillsborough Remembers Oral Collection, which strives to foster communication between generations in the Tampa Bay community.

In honor of the library's 100th anniversary, special digital collections were made available to the public in 2014. These collections include the Burgert Brothers Photographic Collection, Library History Collection, Tampa–Hillsborough County Public Library Art and Artifact Collection, and the History & Genealogy Records of Hillsborough County.

The Port Tampa City Library houses the library's Maritime Reading Room, a collection of books, maps, and maritime artifacts. It includes memorabilia and paintings that are on display as well as material that can be checked out by library patrons.

== Recognitions ==
In 2019 the cooperative received the FLA Library of the Year Award. Tampa-Hillsborough County Public Library was recognized for its community-focused initiatives as it "reorganized its staffing model and eliminated overdue fines, yielding $1 million in savings while increasing access to library resources and expanding opportunities for community engagement through unique, scalable programs."

== Directors ==
There have been a total of seven directors of the Tampa–Hillsborough County Public Library System since it was founded in 1917. Most recently, Andrew S. Breidenbaugh was named director in February 2015.

- Andrew S. Breidenbaugh (2015–present)
- Joe Stines (1991–2015)
- John M. Adams (1983–1991)
- Leo H. Melrose Sr. (1972–1982)
- Cecil P. Beach (1965–1972)
- William S. Frieze (1947–1965)
- Helen V. Stelle (1917–1947)

== Friends of the Library ==
The Friends of the Library of Tampa-Hillsborough County Inc. is a nonprofit organization incorporated under the 501(c), whose goal is to support the 25 different libraries throughout Hillsborough County's diverse communities. The organization is composed of over 1,000 volunteers in 21 different chapters.

The mission statement of the organization is to strengthen, support and advocate for superior free public libraries in Tampa-Hillsborough County. The vision statement is to connect library users to their community and to the world and ensure that all residents have the freedom to read, watch, listen, play, learn, and discover at Tampa-Hillsborough Public Libraries.

The Friends of the Library began in 1967 when a group of individuals came with a vision to support public libraries in this community. The individual friends groups came together under one organizational umbrella, with the last group joining in December 2011.

The Friends of the Library work to raise money for programming and services at each of the public libraries. One of the ways the organization fundraises is by membership dues. Individuals can pledge their support to the Friends of the Library by contributing yearly. The Friends of the Library host book sales at the different branches. Several of the branches have a used book store, hosted by the organization, in which donated books are sold at a discounted price. All proceeds go back to the Friends of the Library to support library programs. Several times a year, the Friends of the Library hosts large one-day-only book sales to bring out community partners and members and increase community engagement.

== Events and programs ==
The Tampa-Hillsborough Public Libraries support and engage the community by hosting special programs, events, and classes to meet the needs of the community. Each branch has a calendar of events for children, teenagers, and adults.

Throughout Hillsborough County, events involve the community in the libraries. Some events are baby time, story time, crochet, puzzle zone, and children's theater. Baby time is where patrons can bond with their babies through books, bouncy rhymes, and songs in a lap-sit program that introduces early literacy skills and encourages language development. Crochet buddies is where children come to learn the basics of crochet. The puzzle zone is where the library puts out puzzles that the whole family can come work on together. Children’s theater is where the library chooses a play for children to work on.

The Hillsborough County Public Library Cooperative offers its patrons ukulele kits. Donated by the Tampa Bay Ukulele Society, the library allows patrons to check out these 20 instruments so they can learn to play for free.

The Tampa-Hillsborough Public Library holds special programs at different times of the year. The 2018 "Summer Libraries Rock" included events for children and adults with a rock theme. It also included reading lists for different age groups and a reading challenge hosted by the Tampa Rays.

== Historical libraries in Tampa ==
=== Harlem Branch Library ===
The Harlem Public Library was one of two libraries in Hillsborough county open to black patrons prior to desegregation. It opened in 1919 inside the Harlem Academy. It was originally established by the Paul Laurence Dunbar Literary Society, an organization of postal workers dedicated to promoting literary discussion and encouraging scholarship. In the early 1920s it was housed in the same building as the Urban League, and relocated to its final home at 1404 Central Ave. in 1927 until 1969.

In 1927, it was reported that the branch owned about 3,500 items, the majority of which were juvenile volumes, and that circulation was 300-350 items per week.

The branch's librarian from 1936 to 1961 was Ada T. Payne, Tampa's first black librarian.

=== Other historical libraries ===
- 7th Avenue Branch, Tampa Free Library
- Clair-Mel Library Station
- Citrus Park Branch Library
- East Branch Library
- East Gate Branch Library
- Eastlake Branch Library
- Hillsborough County Science Library at MOSI
- Hyde Park Branch Library
- Northwest Regional Library
- West Branch Library

== Branches ==
=== 78th Street Community Library ===
78th Street Community Library

General information
- Location: Tampa, Florida, 7625 Palm River Rd.
- Coordinates: 27.940388°N 82.371586°W
- Opened: 1997

Website
- http://www.hcplc.org/hcplc/locations/sst/

The 78th Street Community Library is part of the Tampa–Hillsborough County Public Library System (THPL) and the Hillsborough County Public Library Cooperative (HCPLC). The library is a 8,000 square foot facility located at 7625 Palm River Rd. in Tampa. The library provides books, magazines, music CDs, DVDs, as well as programs and computer training classes.

==== Services ====
- Internet access
- Free WiFi
- Community meeting room
- Public study rooms
- Free scanning

==== Public art ====
The library's interior contains a public art piece titled The Knowledge Path, which was donated by the residents of Clair-Mel, Palm River, and Progress Village communities. The residents believed that the "path" where the books are joined, connects the community.

=== Brandon Regional Library ===
Brandon Regional Library

General information
- Location: Brandon, Florida, 619 Vonderburg Dr., Brandon, Florida 33511
- Coordinates: 27.9294126°N 82.2883908°W
- Opened: 1991

Website
- https://hcplc.org/locations/brandon

==== History ====
The Brandon community first began receiving library service in 1960, when the Brandon Women’s Club opened a corner in its North Moon Street club building to host 1,000 books for the Brandon Area Library. In 1968, the Brandon Branch Library officially opened at 135 West Robertson Street, operated by the Tampa-Hillsborough Public Library System. Although this facility received an expansion in 1975, the Brandon community continued to grow, leading the library to initiate a move in 1991 to its current location on Vonderburg Drive, with a new name, the Brandon Regional Library.

==== Brandon Public Library replacement project ====
The current location of the Brandon Regional Library on Vonderburg Drive has served the community for three decades. However, the two-story building is no longer sufficient for the growing community’s evolving need for collaborative spaces, access to diverse technology resources, and accessible meeting rooms for technology instruction and library programs. The replacement library location will be located at the northeast corner of West Lumsden Road and Woodview Drive, and will be renamed the Brandon Public Library. It will be a single-floor, 25,000 square foot library with a neoclassical architectural design, including classical columns, decorative cornices, window casings, a dome, and brick finishes, reminiscent of the early Carnegie libraries. According to the floor plan, this new location will have a children's collection, reading area, five meeting rooms of various sizes, quiet room, workshop and audio-visual studio, and multiple drive-through windows for library services. The new building will have sufficient parking spaces, including designated charging stations for electric vehicles. Construction is scheduled to be completed in 2027.

=== Charles J. Fendig Public Library ===
Charles J. Fendig Public Library

General information
- Location: Tampa, Florida, 3909 W Neptune St
- Coordinates: 27.930854°N 82.508738°W
- Opened: 1960

Website
- https://www.hcplc.org/locations/charles-j-fendig

The Charles J. Fendig Public Library is a public library in the Tampa–Hillsborough County Public Library System located in South Tampa. It is a 12,000-square-foot, single-story brick building.

==== History ====
The Charles J. Fendig Public Library was dedicated on November 1, 1960, and was initially known as the Peninsular Branch Library. It originally opened in a rented storefront located at 3837 Neptune St. in Tampa. In 1968, the library moved to its present location at 3909 Neptune St. On December 8, 1968, the library was dedicated by then-mayor, Dick Greco, Jr. The building was renovated in 1994. The name was changed in 2001 to honor a former chairman of the Tampa Library Board.

==== Services ====
In addition to books, magazines, DVDs, music CDs, and audiobooks, the library offers meeting rooms, public-use internet computers, access to electronic databases and eBooks, and a used book store. As with all libraries in the Tampa-Hillsborough County Public Library system, the Charles J. Fendig Public Library offers printers, photocopiers, scanners, public fax service, free wi-fi, and assistive technology.

==== Friends of the Library ====
Like all Hillsborough County Public Libraries, the Charles J. Fendig Library is served by a volunteer Friends of the Library group, bearing the name of the library. Proceeds from book sales are used to fund programs for children, teens and adults, and to support other library activities.

=== Town 'N Country Regional Public Library ===
Town 'N Country Regional Public Library

General information
- Location: Tampa, Florida, 7606 Paula Dr., Suite 120
- Coordinates: 27.998640°N 82.565727°W
- Opened: 1969

Website
- http://www.hcplc.org/hcplc/locations/town-n-country

The Town 'N Country Regional Public Library is one of the libraries within the Hillsborough County Public Library Cooperative and is located in West Tampa. It is open seven days a week.

==== History ====
The Town 'N Country Regional Public Library opened in 1969 as the West Gate Branch Library in a storefront at the West Gate Shopping Center. In 1975, it moved to its location on Paula Drive and became the test site for the library's first automated circulation system. The West Gate Branch became a regional branch in 1995.

The West Gate Branch was the focus of national attention after the banning of a gay pride display in 2005.

After 32 years of operation, the Paula Drive location was closed for construction in lieu of the Town 'N Country Commons. In May 2007, the Hillsborough County Board of County Commissioners approved a new name for the current library—"Town 'N Country Regional Public Library". The new library became part of the Town 'N Country Commons along with a Head Start center and a Senior Center next to the Shimberg Gardens.

In the fall of 2021, the branch was closed for a month for an extensive renovation. The library reopened in the downstairs community room as a small makeshift library with eight laptops available for patron use. The branch underwent massive changes, including the complete replacement of the staircase and the addition of six individual bathrooms. The existing study rooms were demolished and eight new study rooms were constructed for patron use. The library officially reopened in January 2023 with all new carpets, staircase, furniture, study rooms, and color scheme. The Hive was removed, and the room was resized and repurposed as a general use room.

==== Services ====
In addition to the resources and services that all branches offer, the Town 'N Country Regional Public Library has a number of assistive technologies available, such as JAWS, Open Book, Dragon Speak, ZoomText, Keys-U-See, and TOPAZ.

The branch is one of four passport services locations. Applicants can schedule an appointment over the phone to apply for a new passport at the branch.

==== Friends of the Library ====
This branch houses the Friends of the Library Bargain Street Bookstore. This store is entirely run by volunteers selling donated books at a very low price, and is open Mondays through Saturdays from 10 a.m. to 4 p.m. All children's books are 25¢.

=== Austin Davis Public Library ===
Austin Davis Public Library

General information
- Location: Odessa, Florida, 17808 Wayne Rd.
- Coordinates: 28.134757°N 82.576532°W
- Opened: 1977

Website
- http://www.hcplc.org/hcplc/locations/adl/

The Austin Davis Public Library is a public library on the north side of Keystone Park in Odessa. It is part of the Tampa–Hillsborough County Public Library System. The library is the repository of community information from the Keystone Civic Association, and maintains back issues of the Keystone Community Newsletter. It has a reading room, children's area, quiet area, electronic media area, meeting room and kitchen, and a cooking oil recycling station.

Initially known as the "Citrus Park-Keystone Library" when it opened in 1977, the Austin Davis Public Library provides service to the community of Citrus Park-Keystone-Odessa. It was a small 800 square foot facility located in a storefront at Fox's Corner Shopping Center. In 1986 the library doubled its size to 1,600 square feet and expanded into a second storefront.

In 1991 Austin Davis and the Austin Davis Family/Winn-Dixie Charities, Inc. offered $1.1 million to build a new library for this community. In May 1993, the new library opened with an area of 10,500 square feet and almost 30,000 volumes.

=== Egypt Lake Partnership Library ===
The Egypt Lake Partnership Library is part of the Tampa–Hillsborough County Public Library System. This library is located at 3403 W. Lambright St. in Tampa. The library was formed by a partnership between the Tampa–Hillsborough County Public Library System and the School District of Hillsborough County. The library is currently open six days a week, and opens at 2:30 pm Monday-Friday to accommodate for the school day.

=== Florida History & Genealogy Library ===
The Florida History & Genealogy Library is located on the fourth floor of the John F. Germany Public Library, the flagship branch of the Tampa-Hillsborough County Public Library system. This special collection houses one of the most sizable genealogy collections in the southeastern United States. Records are available in print, microfilm, and electronic formats. The main emphasis of the collection is on Florida history, but it also includes material related to the southeastern United States and the original 13 American colonies. Record groups include vital statistics and other indexes related to marriages, death, and cemetery records for Florida counties. Additional collections include those related to the military, passenger ships, pensions, and court records.

A Tampa-Hillsborough County Public Library card is not required to access the collection. Materials are only accessible during normal library hours. Items in the collection do not circulate and are restricted to in-library access. Materials cannot be transferred via interlibrary Loan.

=== Jimmie B. Keel Regional Library ===
The Jimmie B. Keel Regional Library was formerly the Northwest Regional Library.

In December 1986, Northwest Regional Library opened at 15610 Premiere Drive. The Jimmie B. Keel Regional Library, a gift from the Winn-Dixie Foundation, replaced the old Northwest Regional Library building on Premiere Drive. The branch is named in honor of Jimmie B. Keel, former Assistant County Administrator, in recognition of his 35 years of service to Hillsborough County.

The Jimmie B. Keel Regional Library opened on February 14, 2001, to serve the Carrollwood and Northdale communities in northern Hillsborough County. A 10,000 square foot expansion of the original 25,000 square foot building was completed in February 2014. It features a glass-enclosed children's room and story time room, a second community room over twice the size of the original, new spaces, furniture and technologies to facilitate collaborative work, a vending café, a larger Carousel Book Store, Adobe Creative Cloud software, assistive technology, a cooking oil recycling station, and electric car charging stations.

Open seven days a week, the library houses a comprehensive circulating collection in multiple formats and a wide variety of programs and services. In addition to the two large community rooms and story time room, four smaller meeting rooms are available for programs, meetings, quiet study and literacy tutoring. A public makerspace, The Hive, offers unique tools, activities and events for hands-on learning. A drive-through window offers convenient checkout and return of library materials to customers on the go.

The Friends of the Jimmie B. Keel Regional Library are active partners who operate the Carousel Bookstore located in the north lobby of the library. They use funds raised by bookstore sales to pay for library programs for adults, teens and children as well as the purchase of furniture, fixtures, technology and art to enhance the facility, including the seven life-sized carousel animals by local artist Cindy Niemi Seifert installed in the children's room.

The Jimmie B. Keel Regional Library is enriched by art acquired through Hillsborough County's Public Art Program, including 17 paintings by local folk artist Mr. B (Jack Beverland) which illustrate "The Song of Hillsborough", written by Hillsborough County's Poet Laureate James E. Tokley, Sr; the screen print Two Butterflies by Carolyn Heller, local artist and founding member of the County's Public Art Committee; the oil and acrylic More Toys More Fun More TV - Red Wagon by James Michaels; the oil on photograph Shadow Play #2 by Richard Reddig; a digital print of Visions for Tomorrow by Bruce Marsh; and an untitled hand colored photograph by Lorraine Genovar. Two sculptural works, Manatee Porthole and Dolphin Smile Porthole, by noted artist Wyland, were donated to the library by the Carrollwood Area Business Association (CABA).

The library is home to Gallery @ 2902, where the works of local and regional artists are regularly exhibited.

=== New Tampa Regional Library ===
The New Tampa Regional Library is part of the Hillsborough County Public Library Cooperative. It is located at 10001 Cross Creek Blvd. in Tampa. It was designed by Harvard Jolly Clees Toppe Architects and has an area of 25,000 square feet. The project was funded by a .10-mill property tax levy and was built on 3.6 acres donated by Markborough Florida Inc. This library sits directly between Hunter's Green Elementary School and Benito Middle School, and has provided literacy opportunities for neighborhood students and families.

=== Norma and Joseph Robinson Partnership Library at Sulphur Springs ===
The Norma and Joseph Robinson Partnership Library at Sulphur Springs is part of the Hillsborough County Public Library Cooperative. It is located at 8412 N 13th St. in Tampa. This library was funded through a collaboration between the Hillsborough County Board of County Commissioners and the Hillsborough County Public Schools. This project allowed the media center at Sulphur Springs Elementary School to be expanded by 3,500 square feet. The creation of this branch has brought more literacy opportunities to the community surrounding the school.

=== North Tampa Branch Library ===
The North Tampa Branch Library is located at 8916 North Blvd. in Tampa. The building underwent a complete renovation but reopened at the same site on September 18, 2009. The location originally opened on January 13, 1964, and measured 3500 square feet. Expansions took place in 1967, increasing its area to 7,000 square feet, and in 1977, to 10,500 square feet. Currently, the building is 24,000 square feet and includes a teen room, children's room, computer lab, meeting rooms, and a quiet study room. The library hosts programs for teenagers and provides involvement opportunities through the Teen Advisory Board, allowing for engagement with students from the neighboring Chamberlain High School. Additional programming is available for children and adults, such as technology classes and the Master Gardner series. Solar panels were installed in April 2020, and megawatt hour generation on a monthly, yearly, and lifetime scale can be tracked on the library's website. As part of the county library art program, the North Tampa Library's children's room showcases Lisa and Joe Vogt's Reach for the Stars stained glass piece, which was donated by the artists.

=== Port Tampa City Library ===
Port Tampa City Library
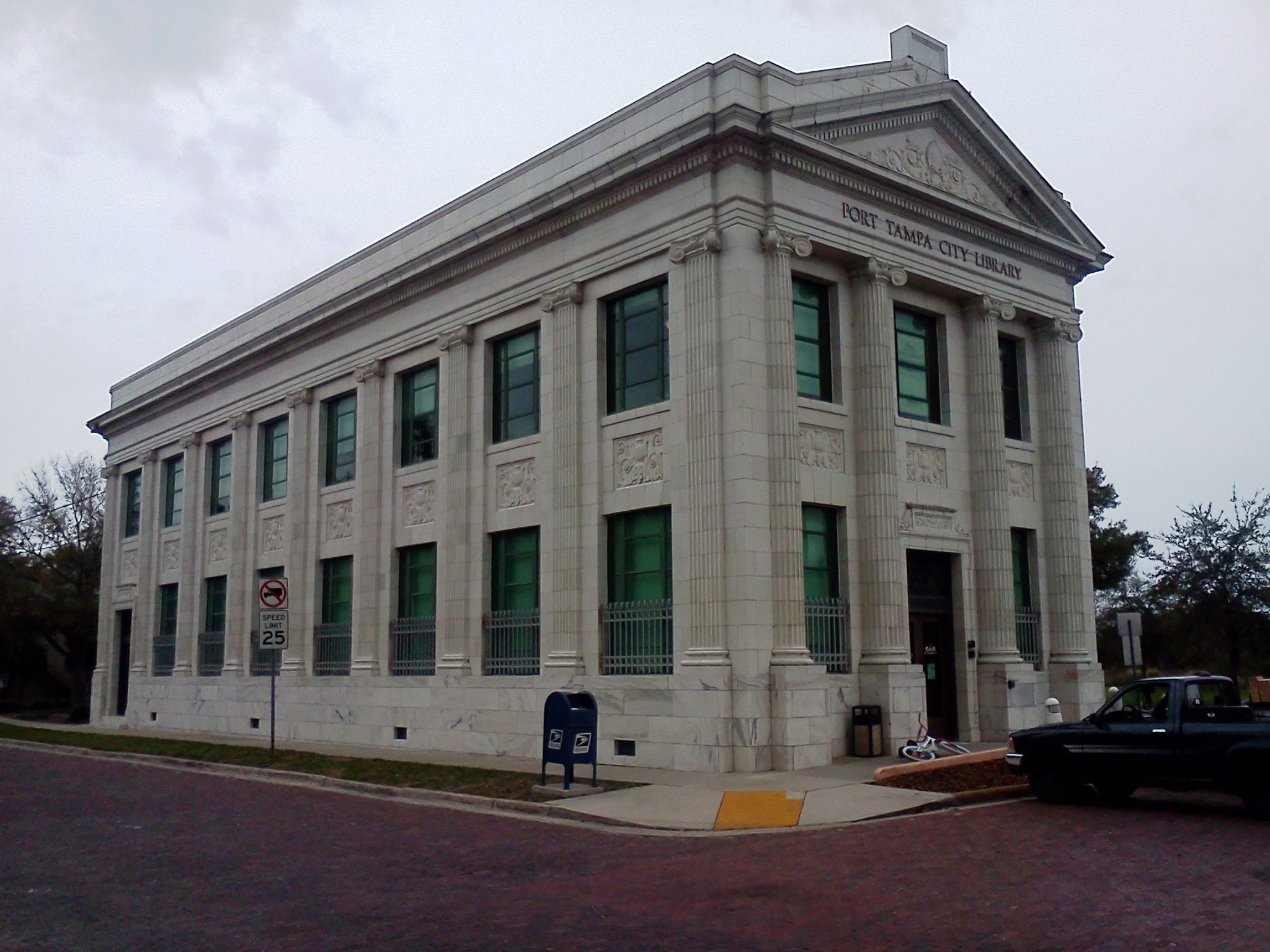

General information
- Architectural style: Neoclassical
- Location: 4902 W. Commerce St., Tampa, Florida
- Coordinates: 27.8640660°N 82.5279230°W
- Opened: 1951
- Renovated: 1997

Website
- http://www.hcplc.org/hcplc/locations/ptm/

The Port Tampa City Library is located at 4902 W Commerce St, Tampa, and is open to the public Monday-Saturday. The library offers public computers, printing, copying, scanning, and faxing services, as well as free WiFi. There are meeting and study spaces available for reservation, among them the Maritime Reading Room, a space dedicated to books, art, and artifacts relating to sailing and the sea.

==== History ====
The library was originally located across the street at 8611 Interbay Blvd. It was created and maintained by the Port Tampa City Women's Club volunteers from 1951 to 1961, at which point it was encompassed by the Tampa Library System. When the Hillsborough County libraries merged with the Tampa Library System in 1984, Port Tampa City Library became a member of the Hillsborough County Public Library Cooperative (HCPLC).

The building it currently resides in was built in 1926 by James G. Yeats and was intended to be a bank. After operating for only seven years, the bank shut down in 1933, and Yeats died that same year. Today, he is remembered in the "Yeats Room", the large community room where programs and classes take place.

The building became the site of many enterprises after that – including a grocery store, an aviation school, a boutique, and even a hospital – until eventually sitting unoccupied for over a decade and being slated for demolition. Before this could occur, the Port Tampa City Women's Club proposed restoring the structure and moving the library into it, as the original library was suffering from cramped quarters and maintenance issues. The idea was proposed in 1993 and came to fruition in 1998. In a ceremonial "passage of the book", the community came together to form a human chain linking the old library to the new. The very last book to be moved, A History of the City of Port Tampa 1888-1961, was passed from person to person until reaching the new structure. The old structure was demolished in 2006.

As of June 2024, the branch was closed for renovation.

=== SouthShore Regional Library ===
The SouthShore Regional Library is part of the Tampa–Hillsborough County Public Library System (THPL), and is the largest branch of the Hillsborough County Public Library Cooperative (HCPLC). Opened in October 2006, this 40,000 square foot facility is located at 15816 Beth Shields Way in Ruskin, and serves the surrounding Ruskin, Sun City, Wimauma, and Apollo Beach south county communities. The library's collection consists of fiction and non-fiction materials, DVDs, audio books, compact discs, newspapers, magazines, local authors' titles, and Spanish language materials. The library features an expansive, non-circulating genealogy collection, which is housed in a separate room alongside other relevant genealogical resources. All libraries belonging to HCPLC share their collections, which includes access to digital materials and resources. Unique lendable materials include ukuleles and Launchpad learning tablets.

The SouthShore Regional Library offers patrons a variety of services including regular adult, teen, and youth programming, study and meeting rooms, art studio and displays, bookable recording studio, makerspace, cooking oil recycling station, as well as access to computers, printers, copiers, assistive technology, and fax machine services. Wireless Internet is available and password-free throughout the building.

The library's recording studio, also known as The HIVE, provides users with tools and software for creating, editing, and publishing audio and video projects. Currently available hardware and software include iMacs, Adobe Creative Cloud, video cameras, microphones, USB audio interface, headphones, green screens, studio lighting, and necessary cables and attachments. SouthShore Library's newly added makerspace, which opened in 2019 as an expansion to The HIVE, provides the surrounding community with access to 3D printing, sewing machines, pop-up programming kits, and various arts and crafts tools.

The library is open seven days a week. A cafe with vending machines and Friends of the Library bookstore are open according to library hours.

=== Robert W. Saunders, Sr. Public Library ===
Robert W. Saunders, Sr. Public Library

General information
- Location: Tampa, Florida, 1505 N Nebraska Ave, Tampa, FL 33605
- Coordinates: 27.95814°N 82.45078°W
- Opened: 1933

Website
- https://hcplc.org/locations/robert-w-saunders-sr

The Robert W. Saunders Sr. Public Library, located on 1505 N. Nebraska Ave. Tampa, was originally opened in 1933 and was named the Ybor City Branch Library. It was donated by the local Italian American Club. The new building at 1505 North Nebraska Avenue was dedicated in January 1969. On November 5, 2003, was renamed Robert W. Saunders, Sr. Public Library to honor the civil rights activist and former NAACP Field Director.

The library houses the African American History & Genealogy Library, including the Hall of History, which contains an interactive exhibit that highlights the Central Avenue business district. Its collection includes the only African-American-focused genealogy resource in the Tampa–Hillsborough County Public Library System where patrons can find a circulating library of African American life, history, culture, authentic African art, encyclopedias, atlases, local history binders, newspaper clippings, and more. The archives room features rare books, microfilm and historical memorabilia.

=== Temple Terrace Public Library ===
The Temple Terrace Public Library is located at 202 Bullard Parkway in the City of Temple Terrace and is part of the Hillsborough County Public Library Cooperative (HCPLC).

==== History ====
The Temple Terrace Library was established in 1959 by the Temple Terrace Women's Club. The doors officially opened on January 15, 1960, after collecting enough donations to facilitate a small library for the community. It was originally run by volunteers of the Women's Club and was located in a small house. As demand grew, they relocated to a City Hall building in April 1961, which is now part of Florida College. The library shortly outgrew this too as they built their collection, and by 1965 they needed a new building and a larger overall operation. This included appointing a library board which was run by the city. They broke ground in September of that year and opened in April of 1966. The Women's Club remained involved and provided the money for the library's service desk.

By the mid-70s they were running out of space and added 5,600 square feet, which enlarged the structure by April 1978.

On February 18, 1982, tragedy ensued when a fire was set by an arsonist. The library lost a devastating 11,666 books and 1,010 recordings. The Women's Club stepped in again and helped restore the building, which opened a year after the fire. In the meantime they relocated materials to the Lightfoot Recreation Center to keep the library going.

In 1997, the library was once again renovated for expansion, which brought its area to 20,000 square feet. It reopened in March 1998 with an online catalog, computers, and internet access. It now has a collection of over 100,000 volumes and 52 community computers.

==== Services ====
Services include standard book, eBook, CD, and DVD checkout. There is access to computers, Wi-Fi, and other technologies as well as regular and 3D printing. There are meeting and study rooms, safe areas for children, and a Book Nook provided by the local Friends of the Temple Terrace Library organization. There are programs for children, teens, and adults which include activities and resources for certain age groups and developmental levels ranging from story time to crafts and games.

The library offers many resources beyond books such as sewing machines, cooking items, tools, board games, and neckties to borrow for various reasons. Patrons can even "check out" a limited number of seed packets each month that do not have to be returned and come with instructions on how to take care of them. These are all resources that have been proven to be successful in the local community to help provide items that may only occasionally be needed.

Partnering with the University of South Florida Special & Digital Collections and Tampa-Hillsborough County Libraries, the Temple Terrace Library provides access to archives of the local newspapers, the Temple Terrace Beacon and Temple Terrace Sentinel.

=== Other libraries ===
- Arthenia L. Joyner University Area Community Library
- Bloomingdale Regional Public Library
- Brandon Regional Library
- Bruton Memorial Library
- C. Blythe Andrews, Jr. Public Library
- Florida History & Genealogy Library
- James J. Lunsford Law Library
- Jan Kaminis Platt Regional Library
- John F. Germany Public Library
- Lutz Branch Library
- Maureen B. Gauzza Public Library
- New Tampa Regional Library
- North Tampa Branch Library
- Planning Commission Library
- Riverview Public Library
- Robert W. Saunders, Sr. Public Library
- Ruskin Branch Library
- Seffner-Mango Branch Library
- Seminole Heights Branch Library
- Temple Terrace Public Library
- Thonotosassa Branch Library
- West Tampa Branch Library
- Witt Research Center
