= James J. Lunsford Law Library =

- Interactive map of the James J. Lunsford Law Library area

General information
- Location: 701 E. Twiggs Street, Tampa, FL
- Coordinates: 27.951256°N 82.454029°W
- Opened: 1937

The James J. Lunsford Law Library is a member of the Tampa–Hillsborough County Public Library System (THPL) and the Hillsborough County Public Library Cooperative (HCPLC).

Located on Twiggs Street, in Tampa, Florida, the research/reference library specialises in providing materials for legal research. While the law library's core legal research collection cannot be checked out, the library is open to the public.

== History ==
In 1937, The Hillsborough County Law Library opened in the Old Courthouse at the corner of Franklin and Lafayette (now Kennedy). At age 67, James Joseph Lunsford, a self-taught attorney, came out of retirement to head the newly founded library. The library's original collection included Lunsford's own law books along with those of his colleagues and peers. He worked there for more than fourteen years and up until his death in 1952 at the age of 82.

In 1952, the day after James Joseph Lunsford's death, the library moved from the Old Courthouse location to the then new courthouse at Pierce and Kennedy. The library moved several more times after that. In 1991, the library relocated to the Fred Karl Legal Center at Jefferson and Kennedy. Then, in October 2000, the library moved to a temporary location at 501 E. Kennedy Blvd at Morgan and Kennedy.

In 2001, the Hillsborough County Law Library was re-dedicated to Hillsborough County's first law librarian, James Joseph Lunsford.

In July 2008 the library moved to its current home in the old courthouse building, located at 701 E. Twiggs St., at the corner of Pierce and Twiggs.

In March 2015, The James J. Lunsford Law Library officially joined the Tampa-Hillsborough County Public Library.

== James J. Lunsford ==
James J. Lunsford was born in Alabama on February 2, 1870, and moved to Tampa, Florida in 1899. He began practicing law at age 29 with focus on criminal and corporate law, and initially partnered with Thomas Palmer and later Pat Whitaker. He was highly regarded in Tampa and after retiring from legal practice was asked to serve as Hillsborough County's first Law Librarian. Over the years he became known by the title "Judge" in recognition of the admiration and respect that members of the local legal community had for him, rather than in connection with any official appointment.

== Services ==
- Free Wireless (WiFi)
- Free Internet Access through library computers
- Photocopiers - 20 cents per page
- Public Meeting Rooms
- Wireless Printing
- Free Continuing Legal Education CDs: The library offers a collection of Continuing Legal Education (CLE) CDs that are available for checkout by anyone with a library card. CDs can be checked out for one week. Courses offered include options that include hours that count towards the Florida Bar's requirements for continuing legal education programs in ethics and technology.
