= Burgert Brothers =

Photographer duo

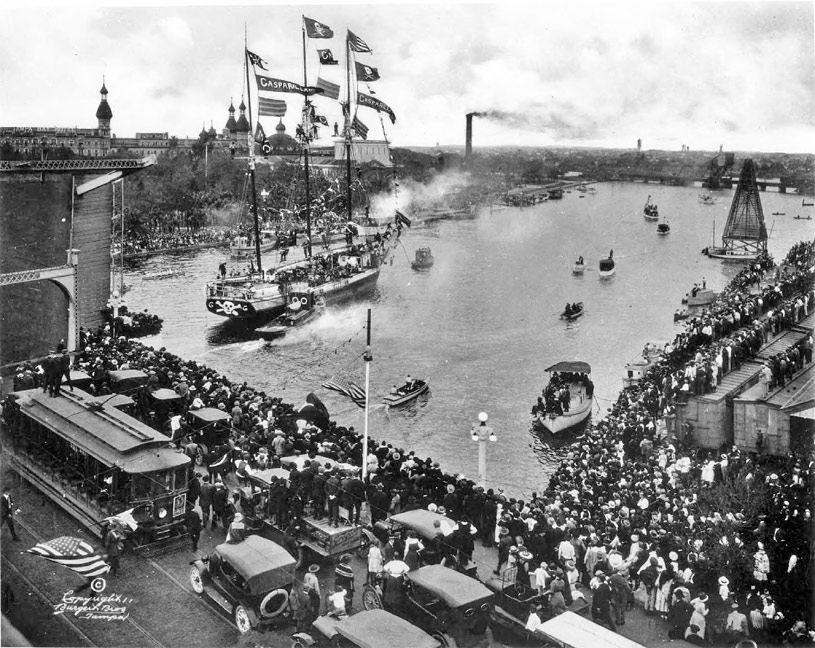
Jose Gasparilla ship 1922

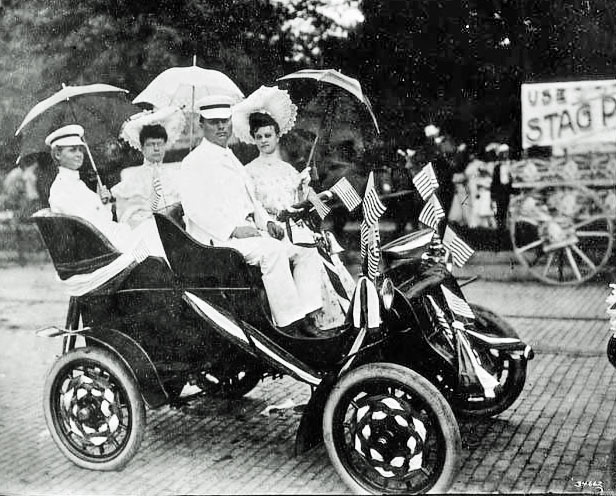
Automobile in second Gasparilla parade, 1905

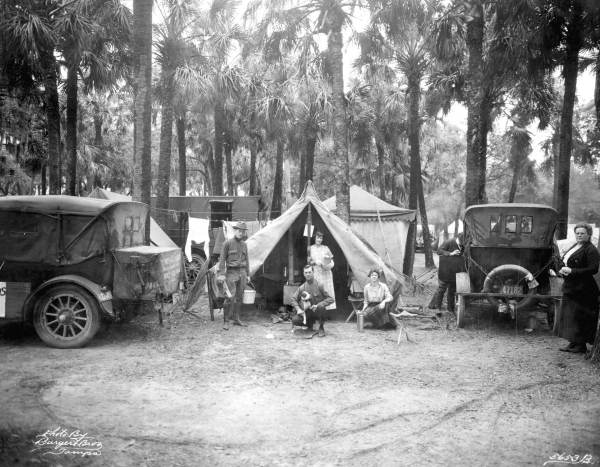
"Tin Can Tourists" at De Soto Park, December 1920

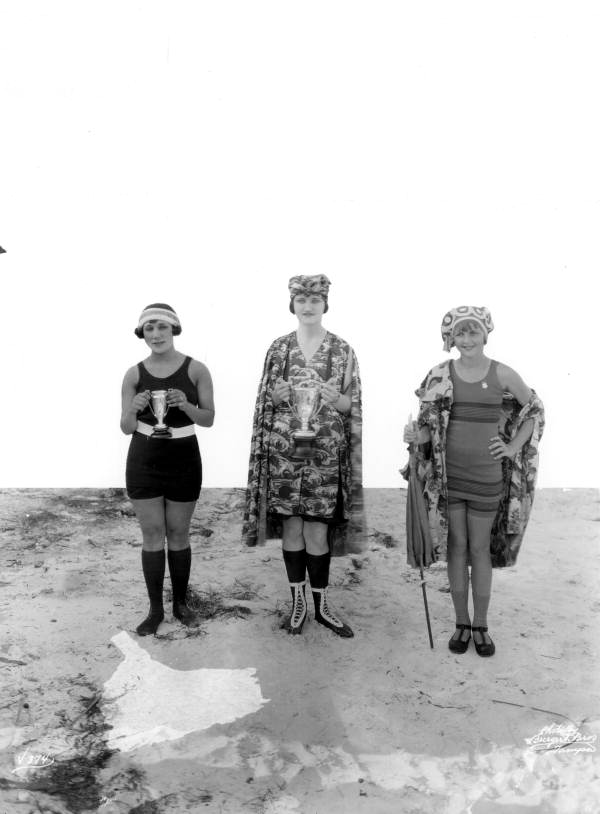
Bathing costume contestants at Ballast Point, 1922

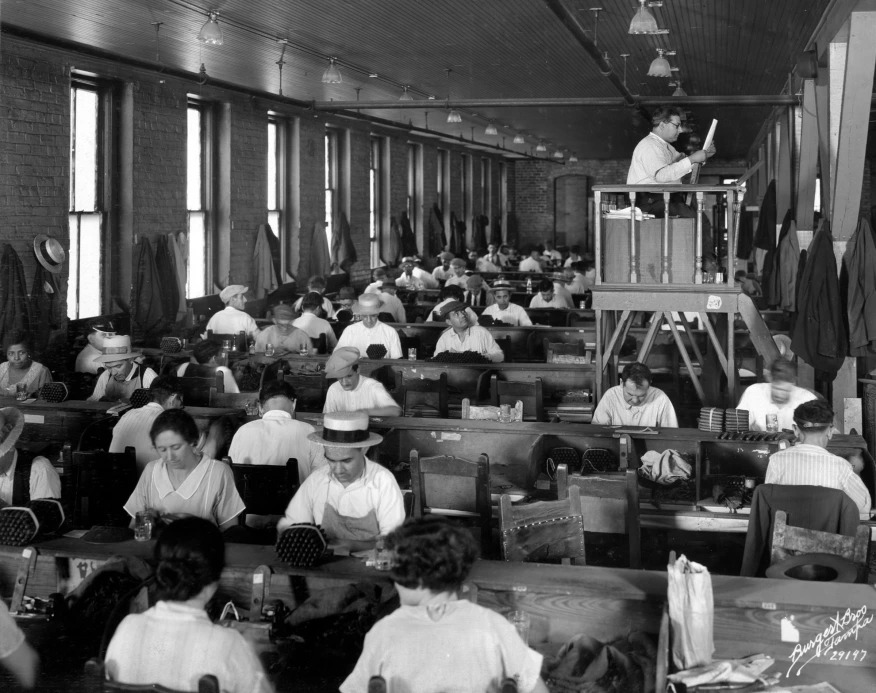
Lector reading at Cuesta-Rey Cigar Company in Tampa, 1929

The Burgert Brothers were early photographers, most prominently known for documenting the growth of Tampa, Florida. Their photos span the late 1800s until the early 1960s. They depict times of war, natural disasters such as the 1921 Tampa Bay hurricane, economic booms, economic busts, transportation, building projects, bungalows, African American life, cigar factories, sponge docks, strawberry fields, mercantile businesses, banks, and service stations. They also feature Florida leisure activities at parks and beaches including golf, shuffleboard, checkers, and tennis. Thanks to the prolific Burgert Brothers local events and traditions like the Gasparilla Pirate Festival and Florida State Fair have been well-documented.

The Tampa–Hillsborough County Public Library System has a collection of more than 20,000 of their photos at the John F. Germany Library in downtown Tampa. The University of South Florida also has a digital collection of their photographs and has made over 860 available online.

== History ==
The Burgert family of photographers spanned three generations and worked productively in the field for nearly 100 years, beginning in the 1860s in Cincinnati, Ohio, and travelling into several states of the southeastern United States; primarily Florida. There were six sons and one daughter-in-law of the original photographic progenitor of the family, Samuel Peter Burgert. The first Burgert photos in Ybor City were taken in 1899 shortly after the family's arrival in Florida.

It was there that the Burgert business expanded from portraiture to include commercial photography in the early 1900s.

The Burgert Brothers Commercial Photography Studio was established when Jean was joined by his brother Al. The studio location was in Ybor City. It was acquired from William A. Fishbaugh, the Burgerts' competitor, in 1917. It was the leading commercial photographic firm in Tampa from 1917 until the early 1960s. The Burgert Brothers set themselves apart with their ability to travel the bay area and offer mobile services in their logo-emblazoned truck.

The Burgert Brother's photography utilized various technical innovations and methods including Cirkut cameras to make panoramic photographs, aerial photography, and the use of movie cameras. Several of Al Burgert's photos were published in LIFE Magazine issues.

Al Severson, who worked for the brothers, became a partner and eventually took over the firm and ownership of many photographic negatives. Around that time, historian and Ybor City native Tony Pizzo purchased one hundred of the negatives that documented his hometown. By 1965 the rest of the collection had made its way into the offices of Carlton Trimble, a Tampa businessman. Allen Morris, the curator of the state photographic archives, was in Tampa for a legislative caucus when he heard about the collection and sought out Trimble. Over the next year, Morris periodically examined Burgert negatives and selected those he found noteworthy to purchase for $3 each. Morris gradually purchased approximately 500 negatives for the State Archives in Tallahassee, Florida.

After a 1967 conviction for producing and distributing pornography, Trimble sold his collection to Henry Cox, president of Tampa Photo Supply. By chance, Cox met local historian Hampton Dunn, who recognized the priceless value of the archive as a record of Tampa history. Dunn paid Cox $500 for an unspecified number of the negatives, some of which were published in a book of Tampa photography entitled Yesterday's Tampa. At that time, Cox offered the remainder of the collection to Morris for $10,000. The state could not afford that price. Dunn and Raymond E. Bunch, the owner of a local photography store, used community pride and the possibility of a tax write-off to convince Cox to part with the collection for $2,000. In 1974, the Tampa-Hillsborough County Public Library, with the help of a volunteer support organization, the Friends of the Library, bought the collection and fourteen handwritten ledgers listing the 70,000 negatives with identifying numbers and simple descriptions.

To date, over 20,000 of these negatives have been developed, digitized, and electronically indexed for the library's website. This was made possible due to special grants awarded to the Tampa-Hillsborough County Public Library from the National Historical Publications & Records Commission.

A gala was held at the Henry Plant Museum September 22, 2017 to celebrate the 100th anniversary of the Burgert Brothers firm.
