= Andrew S. Breidenbaugh =

American librarian

- Education: Towson University, University of Maryland, University of South Florida
- Occupation: Library director

Andrew S. Breidenbaugh is an American librarian and director of the Tampa-Hillsborough County Public Library System. He has worked to bring online databases, eBooks, streaming media, music, and courses to the system.

== Education ==
Breidenbaugh began his education in 1988 at Towson University, Towson, Maryland, where he earned a Bachelor of Arts in History and Asian Studies. He was a member of the Phi Alpha Theta history honors society as well as the National History Honor Society. In 1990 he finished his Master of Arts in History at the University of Maryland. His area of concentration was Middle East and Islamic History. In 1996, he completed his education at the University of South Florida School of Information, where he received his degree in Library and Information Science.

== Career ==
Before graduating from USF, Breidenbaugh managed a Barnes & Noble bookstore for several years. Towards the end of his graduate studies, he worked for the City of Tampa Archives and Records Center, where he accessed, arranged, and described records of the Tampa Fire Department. From 1996 to 1999, he held his first job as a librarian at the USF Tampa Campus Library, where he was an adjunct reference librarian. There, he began his work with library technology and online services. Nearly concurrent to this time (1997–1999), Breidenbaugh began working for the Tampa-Hillsborough County Public Library System at the New Tampa Regional Library as a reference librarian. He was also an adjunct instructor for the USF School of Information, teaching Basic Information Sources & Services, Internet Research Skills, and Internet Resources.

From 1999 to 2002, Breidenbaugh was a senior librarian for Electronic Reference & Information, a call-in and email reference service for the Tampa-Hillsborough library system. From 2002 to 2006 he was a principal librarian at the John F. Germany Public Library, Tampa’s main library, and continued his focus on library technology and internet resources. Following his time at the John F. Germany library, he was named chief librarian for the South Tampa Region. In April 2014, he became manager of library technology and collections, which included oversight of the library’s collection process and its budget. In February 2015, Breidenbaugh was named director of the Tampa-Hillsborough County Public Library System. He oversees its $36.5 million annual operating budget, 25 libraries, and two mobile outlets.

== Organizations and volunteering ==
Breidenbaugh is an active member of the American Library Association and the Florida Library Association. He also volunteers with FIRST, judging for FIRST Tech Challenge events in the Tampa Bay area.
