= Maureen B. Gauzza Public Library =

Maureen B. Gauzza Public Library (formerly the Upper Tampa Bay Regional Public Library)
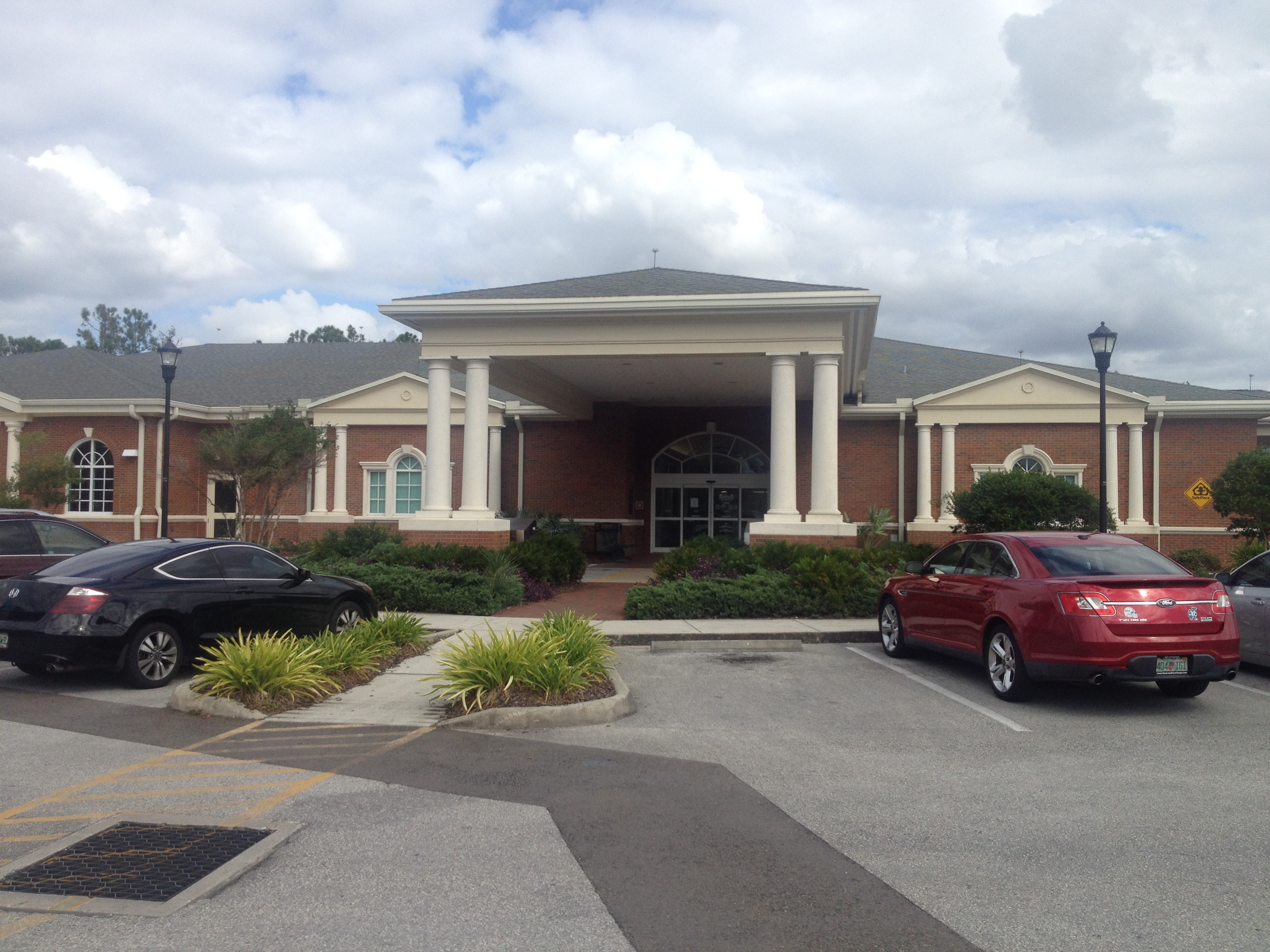
- The Upper Tampa Bay Regional Public Library in 2015 [before being renamed the Maureen B. Gauzza Public Library]
- 28.06248°N 82.62301°W
- Location: Tampa, Florida, United States
- Established: 2005
- Branch of: Tampa-Hillsborough County Public Library System

Other information
- Website: www.hcplc.org/hcplc/locations/mgl/

The Maureen B. Gauzza Public Library, formerly known as the Upper Tampa Bay Regional Public Library, is part of the Tampa-Hillsborough County Public Library System (THPL), as well as a member of the Hillsborough County Public Library Cooperative (HCPLC). It is a 26,000 square foot facility located at 11211 Countryway Blvd. in Tampa, Florida. In addition to books, newspapers and magazines, the library provides DVDs, music, and internet access, as well as a variety of programs and activities and meeting rooms.

== History ==
The 1,500 square foot Upper Tampa Bay Regional Public Library was dedicated and opened to the public on January 8, 2005. Construction of the $4.5 million building was funded by the Hillsborough County Board of County Commissioners and a grant from the Florida Department of State, Division of Library Services.

Construction on an 114,300-square-foot expansion and 2,200-square-foot renovation began in January 2013 and was completed in February 2014 at a cost of $2.2 million. The additional space was needed to accommodate and serve the growing population of the community. The expansion added additional reading space, a new children's area, multi-purpose space, a larger community room, a pantry, additional bathrooms, and storage. The renovation concentrated on installing a vending cafe, and revamping the Friends of the Library bookstore and teen area. Long & Associates Architects/Engineers, Inc. served as the designers for the project with the Williams Company serving as general contractor. On Wednesday, May 28, 2014, a ribbon-cutting ceremony was held to celebrate the expansion of the library.

On August 2, 2017, the library was renamed after Maureen Gauzza, founder of the Upper Tampa Bay chapter of the Friends of the Library. Maureen Gauzza [née Beirne] was born in Yonkers, New York and relocated to central Florida in 1981 before moving to Westchase in 1998. She began advocating for a public library to serve the growing population of the area, including but not limited to Westchase. She worked alongside District 5 County Commissioner Ken Hagan, whom she had met while he going door-to-door campaigning for office, and original library architect Sol Fleischman to complete the project. She was the founder of the Upper Tampa Bay Friends of the Library and served at the group's president from 2005 to 2015. She died on July 3, 2017, at the age of 75.

== Friends of the library ==
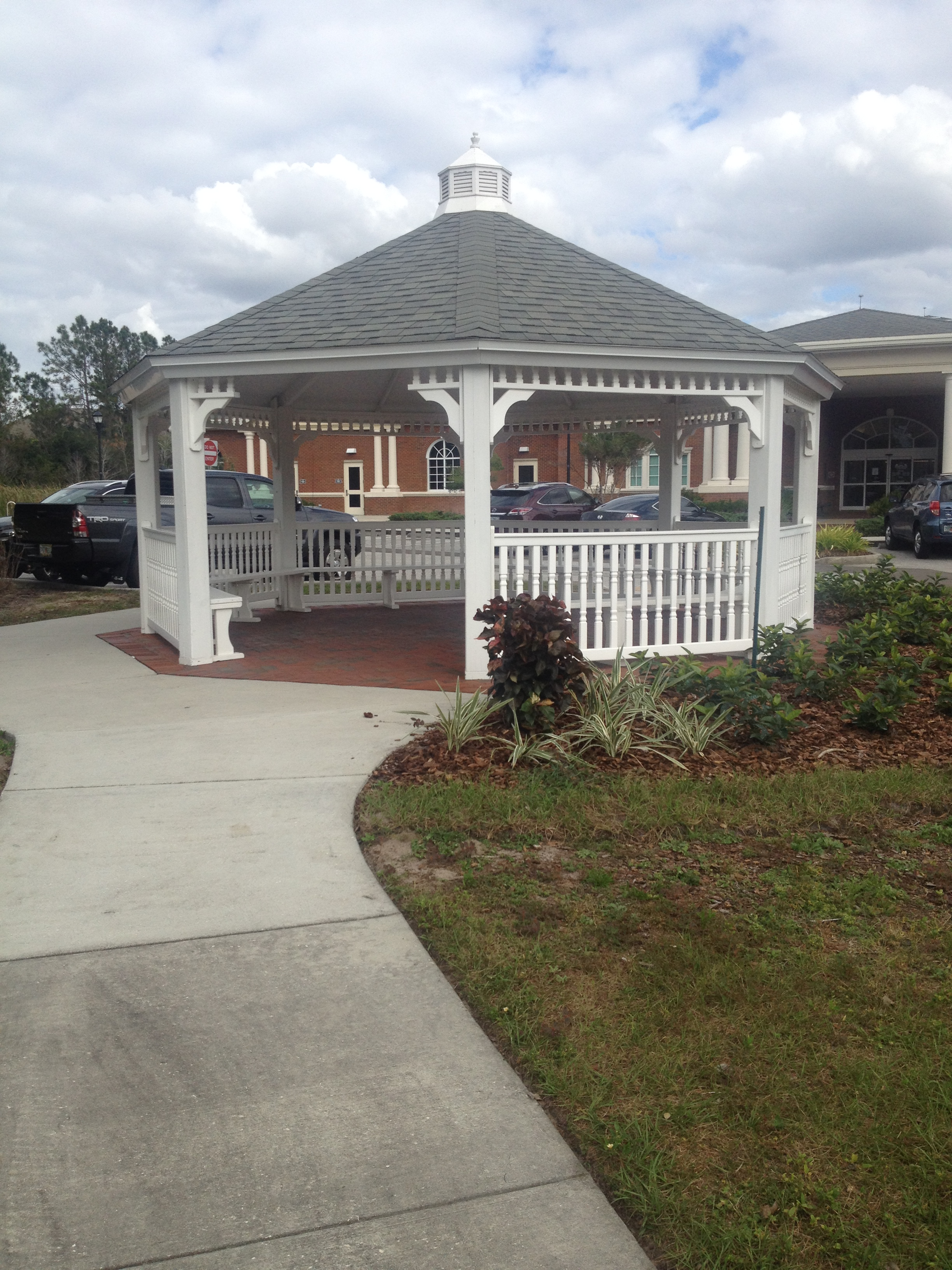
Gazebo in front of library

The Friends of the Maureen B. Gauzza Public Library operate the Gazebo bookstore inside the library lobby. Money raised by the Friends is used to support library programming and events.

The Friends purchased all the art for the library, aside from the sculptural elements donated by the nearby Westfield Mall at Citrus Park and the Majolica Tile Project, donated by the Westchase Artists Society. In the lobby of the main entrance, The Friends have installed a large bronze tree that is inscribed with the names of donors (on the leaves, acorns, and stones) who have contributed to the library.

The Friends of the Maureen B. Gauzza Public Library meet on the first Monday of the month at 4 pm.

== Services ==
- Adobe Creative Cloud Software
- Assistive Technologies
- Cooking Oil Recycling Station
- Free WiFi
- Innovation Studio
- Internet Access
- Public Meeting Rooms
- Photocopiers
- Public FAX
- Self-Checkout
- Snack and Beverage Vending
- Wireless Printing
- 24/7 Backdrop Access
- Gazebo Book Store open during library hours
