= Seminole Heights branch library =

Seminole Heights Branch Library
- Interactive map of the Seminole Heights Branch Library area

General information
- Location: Tampa, Florida, 4711 N Central Ave. Tampa, FL 33603
- Coordinates: 27.988458°N 82.455046°W
- Opened: 1927

Website
- https://hcplc.org/locations/seminole-heights

The Seminole Heights Branch Library is a member of the Tampa–Hillsborough County Public Library System.

The Seminole Heights Branch Library is located on Central Avenue in Tampa and serves the Seminole Heights and Hampton Terrace communities. The library has a very active Friends of the Library group and works closely with the surrounding community, including the Old Seminole Heights Neighborhood Association (OSHNA).

== History ==
The Seminole Heights Branch Library is one of twenty-seven county libraries in Hillsborough County, Florida. Founded in 1927, the Seminole Heights Branch library was one of the original seven public libraries that existed in the City of Tampa. The library moved to its current location at the corner of Osbourne and Central Avenue in 1965 and is situated close to Hillsborough High School and Memorial Middle School. Closed briefly in the summer of 2003 for renovations and AC repair, the old building was closed in 2012 before being completely torn down. A two-story, 22,000 square foot building was built at the same location and the new Seminole Heights library was officially dedicated on March 17, 2014. Its decor and architecture was completed in an American Craftsman style, echoing the popular style found in many homes in the surrounding community. The new building houses a donation bookstore, meeting spaces, as well as a children's library collection along with the main collection.

== Services ==
- Free Wireless (WiFi)
- Internet Access
- Public Meeting Rooms
- Photocopiers
- Public FAX
- Snack & Beverage Vending
- Wireless Printing
- 24/7 Book drop access
- Access to Adobe Creative Cloud desktop apps for members on a first-come-first-served basis
