= Riverview Public Library =

Coordinates: 27.871482°N 82.329521°W

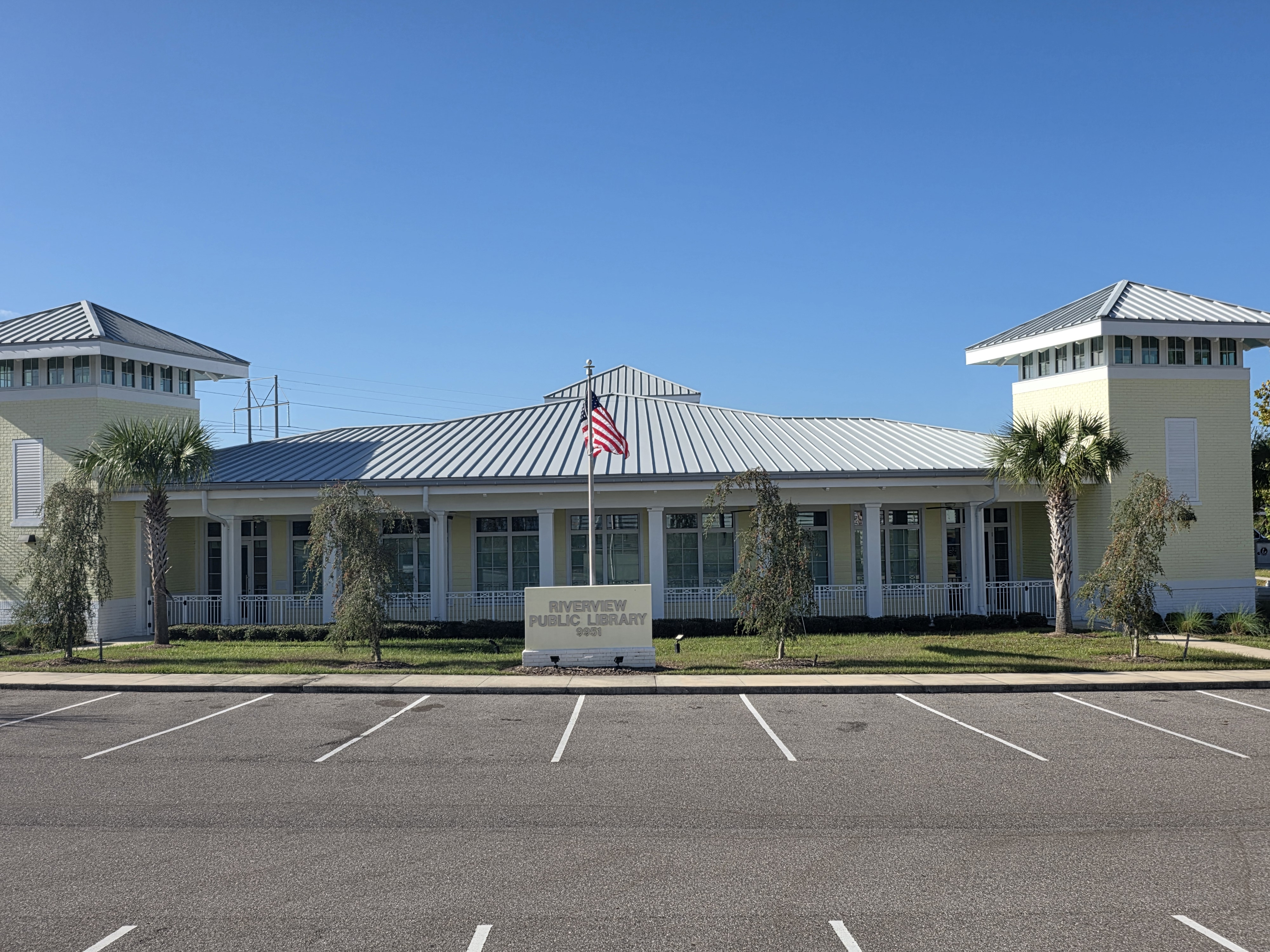
Riverview Public Library

The Riverview Public Library is part of the Tampa–Hillsborough County Public Library System and the Hillsborough County Public Library Cooperative. The library is located in Hillsborough County, Florida.

The Riverview Public Library houses over 70,000 items – books, audiobooks, magazines, and DVDs – and provides online and internet access to its patrons, via public access computers and Wi-Fi connectivity. The library offers computer training classes for children, teens, and adults, as well as community and study rooms available for public use. The Riverview Public Library has a recording studio, 2 creative content rooms, a makerspace, and a 'makeryspace' for children.

The Friends of the Riverview Library manage the book store in the library.

== History ==
The Riverview Branch Library opened on November 18, 1979 inside an 8,000-square foot building to serve the populations of Riverview, Gibsonton, and Apollo Beach. The land was donated by the Gardinier Corporation, which was previously being used as a worm farm. Originally, library services were offered via a bookmobile stop called Riverview Station which was placed in a local grocery store. As the needs of the community grew, citizens formed the Riverview Library Association and made plans to build the library itself. In 2008, the size of the parking lot was doubled.

More than 103,810 visitors have checked out more than 200,000 items from the Library. This one-room library also had limited computers, access to power device charging, and only one 55-seat meeting room. The Riverview Branch Library was declared functionally obsolete and plans for an expansion/replacement were discussed.

On March 3, 2016, a public meeting was held about the proposed expansion/replacement of the Riverview Branch Library, with four sites put forth for consideration. The new library was targeted for completion by Spring 2020.

== Services ==
Current materials and services provided at the Riverview Public Library include:

- Books
- Recorded books
- Magazines
- DVDs
- Internet access
- WiFi connectivity
- Printing and Photocopying
- Scanning (bring a flash drive)
- Faxing (local and toll free)
- Assistive technology
- Programs
- Computer training classes
- Community & study rooms
- Recording studio
- Makerspace
- Friends of the Riverview Library book store

== Replacement building ==
The replacement Riverview Branch Library covers 35,000 square feet and has eight meeting rooms, along with a designated makerspace, a recording/editing studio, a covered and screened-in reading porch, a 5,000 square feet children's area, the Friends of the Library bookstore, and a vending café. New sustainable features include a solar panel power system on the building's roof, an electric car charging station, patio furniture from recycled materials, and a focus on native/drought-resistant landscaping.

The expected completion date was set for spring 2020. The cost for the new building was estimated at $12.6 million and was to be paid from the Library Capital Projects Fund. Ground was broken for the replacement building in April 2019 and the new Riverview Branch Library opened on April 5, 2021.
