= Temple Terrace Public Library =

Public library branch in Hillsborough County, Florida

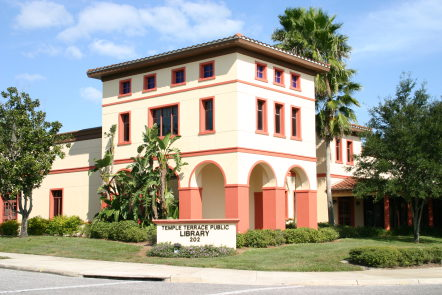
- 28.0329°N 82.39129°W
- Location: Temple Terrace, Florida, United States
- Established: 1960

Other information
- Director: Teressa Fraser
- Website: https://www.templeterrace.gov/154/Public-Library

The Temple Terrace Public Library serves 250,000 patrons a year with a selection of more than 100,000 volumes, 22 computers, and 12 laptops for in-house checkout. It is the only library in the city of Temple Terrace, FL, and it is part of the Hillsborough County Library Cooperative, along with branches in Tampa, Florida and Plant City, Florida. It is located near several colleges, including the University of South Florida and Florida College, as well as the Museum of Science & Industry in Tampa.

== History ==
The library was established on January 15, 1960, after the Temple Terrace Woman's Club became inspired to create a community library. The local Boy Scout groups and city residents supplied the first book collection for this newly established library. Temple Terrace donated a small caddy house on the 19th tee of the city golf course to serve as the library.

The original location on the golf course.

The funding came from the Woman's Club. Within a year, the collection and circulation had outgrown the caddy house. In April 1961, City Hall became the new location for the library. The city hall building is now a part of Florida College. The rise of library patrons and the demand for more services prompted the city to take over the library from the volunteers. The city appointed a Library Board, which made the Temple Terrace Public Library eligible to receive books from the Hillsborough County Library Service which allowed the Library's book collection to grow rapidly.

In 1962, the Friends of the Temple Terrace Library (also known as "the Friends") were formed and became a Florida Corporation with tax exempt 501(C)(3) status in 1997. The purpose of the group was to support the Library financially. Their efforts go towards providing secure equipment, furnishings, and materials that may not be available due to the limited budget of the library. Additionally, they promote the Library and its various service to the community. Since their inception, the Friends of the Temple Terrace Library have raised many thousands of dollars to support library services. The Friends of the Temple Terrace Library have also wrote, published, and sold a book on the history of the Temple Terrace area.

On September 23, 1965, construction on a new, larger library began at 202 Bullard Parkway. The funds to purchase the land and construct the new library came from local, state, and federal funds. On April 17, 1966, the library opened its doors. The Women's Club provided money for the new customer service desk due to their ongoing interest in the project. In the mid-1970s, an additional 5,600 square feet were added to the existing structure to keep up with the number of patrons. The newly enlarged library was dedicated April 2, 1978. In 1998, the library was renovated and enlarged, and an online catalog and Internet access were added to the services available. Today the Temple Terrace Library has extensive resources with over 100,000 volumes and 52 patron computers.

Currently The Temple Terrace Library has a partnership with the University of South Florida and the Tampa- Hillsborough County Libraries to make two Temple Terrace newspapers available digitally. The two collections are the Temple Terrace Sentinel and the Temple Terrace Beacon. The Temple Terrace Sentinel remained in print from January 17, 1940, to July 4, 1946, and was eventually it was presented to the Temple Terrace Public Library by the Temple Terrace Lions Club in honor of the owner, publisher, and editor, Mr. John L. Perry. This was later donated to the University of South Florida Special Collections, and this publication is published in a newsletter format, with the tagline: "Temple Terrace’s first newspaper. We print only the truth." The publication's content, written by reporters Jimmy Hawk, Jules Swanson, and Whitney Pinnell includes community news, births, deaths, illnesses, civic announcements, classified advertisements, and anecdotes, all of which you can view on the website. The other newspaper, the Temple Terrace Beacon, was originally published in 1931, and includes community news, civic announcements, local sports stories, letters from various readers sent in, business reviews, classified advertisements, and television logs. The digital collection available on through the Digital Collections comprises over 700 issues from 1978 to 1995.

=== Fire ===
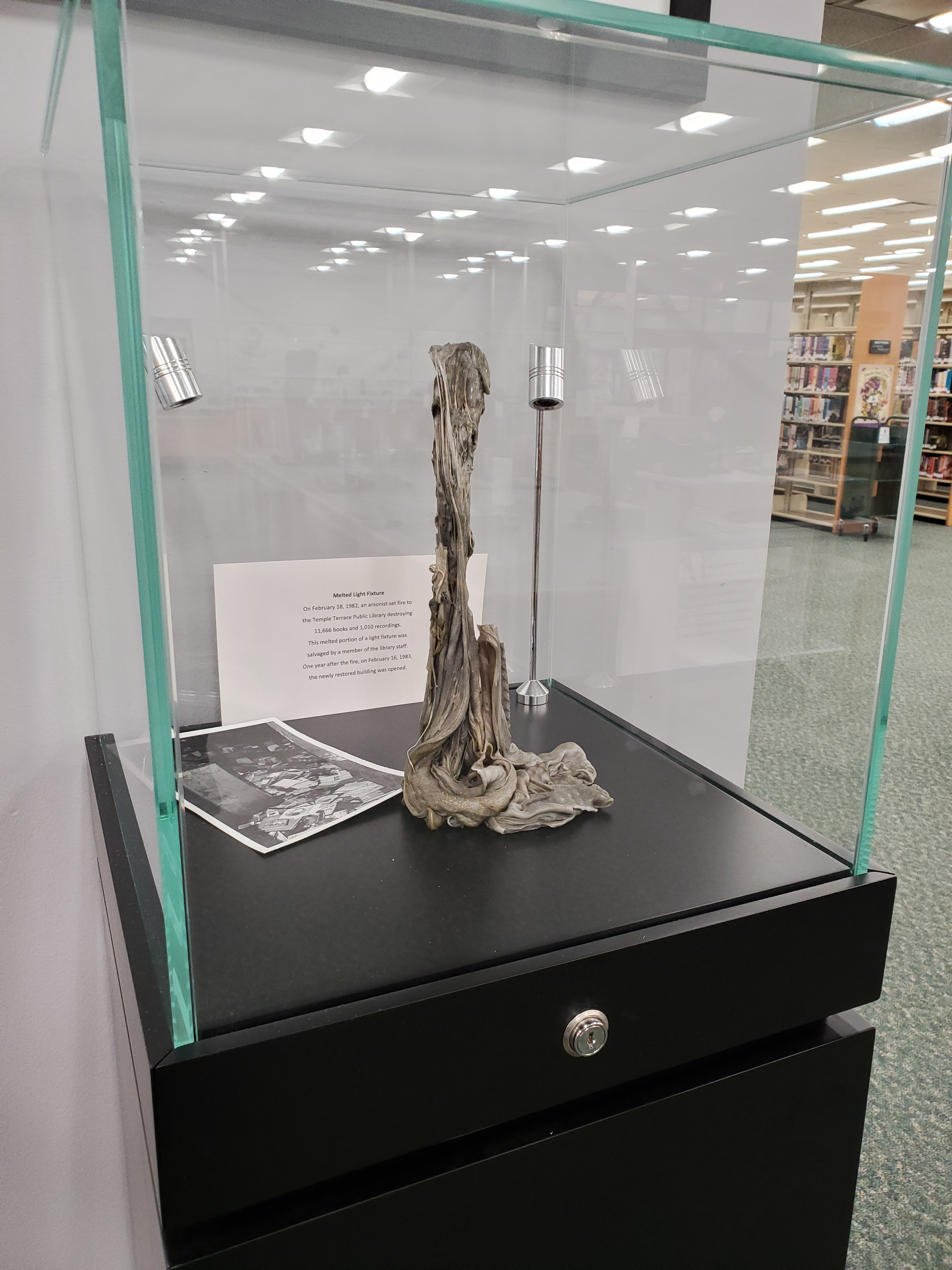
A light fixture that melted in the 1982 fire now sits on display in the library.

An arsonist set fire to the library in the morning of February 18, 1982. The blaze destroyed 11,666 books and 1,010 recordings within the library's collection. However, the citizens and the Woman's Club rallied and helped restore the library. It reopened in a temporary location, the Lightfoot Recreation Center, six weeks after the arson. Less than a year after the fire, on February 16, 1983, the new library was again open for business.

=== Book Nook ===
After the library was expanded and renovated in 1998, The Friends of the Temple Terrace Library (the "Friends") were able to realize one of their goals of opening a Book Nook. The Book Nook is a continuing fundraising activity which offers used books for sale. The books used in the Book Nook are donated by members of the surrounding community. The money made by the Book Nook is given back to the Library in order to improve library services. The Book Nook is located in the main lobby of the Temple Terrace Library and is mainly operated by volunteers who are members of the Friends of the Temple Terrace Library, Inc, but it does have a small staff. Donated books are left in a drop-off box within the main lobby of the Library.

=== Beyond Books Lending Library ===
In spring 2016, the Temple Terrace Public Library began lending out more than just books and DVDs. Library patrons are able to check out items like cake pans, tools, board games, sewing machines, and much more, for one week at a time. All of these items have been donated and have helped make the library feel like a resource for the community when they need or want to use an item that they may not be able to purchase. More recently there was a donation of a collection of neck ties that can be borrowed for interviews as an initiative to help prepare people for jobs. Especially with many local schools and colleges nearby. In 2018 the library also began a program where you could "check out" seed packets. It began when they repurposed a library card catalog into a seed catalog where you can get up to four seed packets each month. These items are limited but do not have to be returned and also come with gardening tips and how to care for each plant. There is a featured "Seed of the Month" as well as many other varieties, some that are specifically meant to grow in this area.

=== COVID-19 Pandemic ===
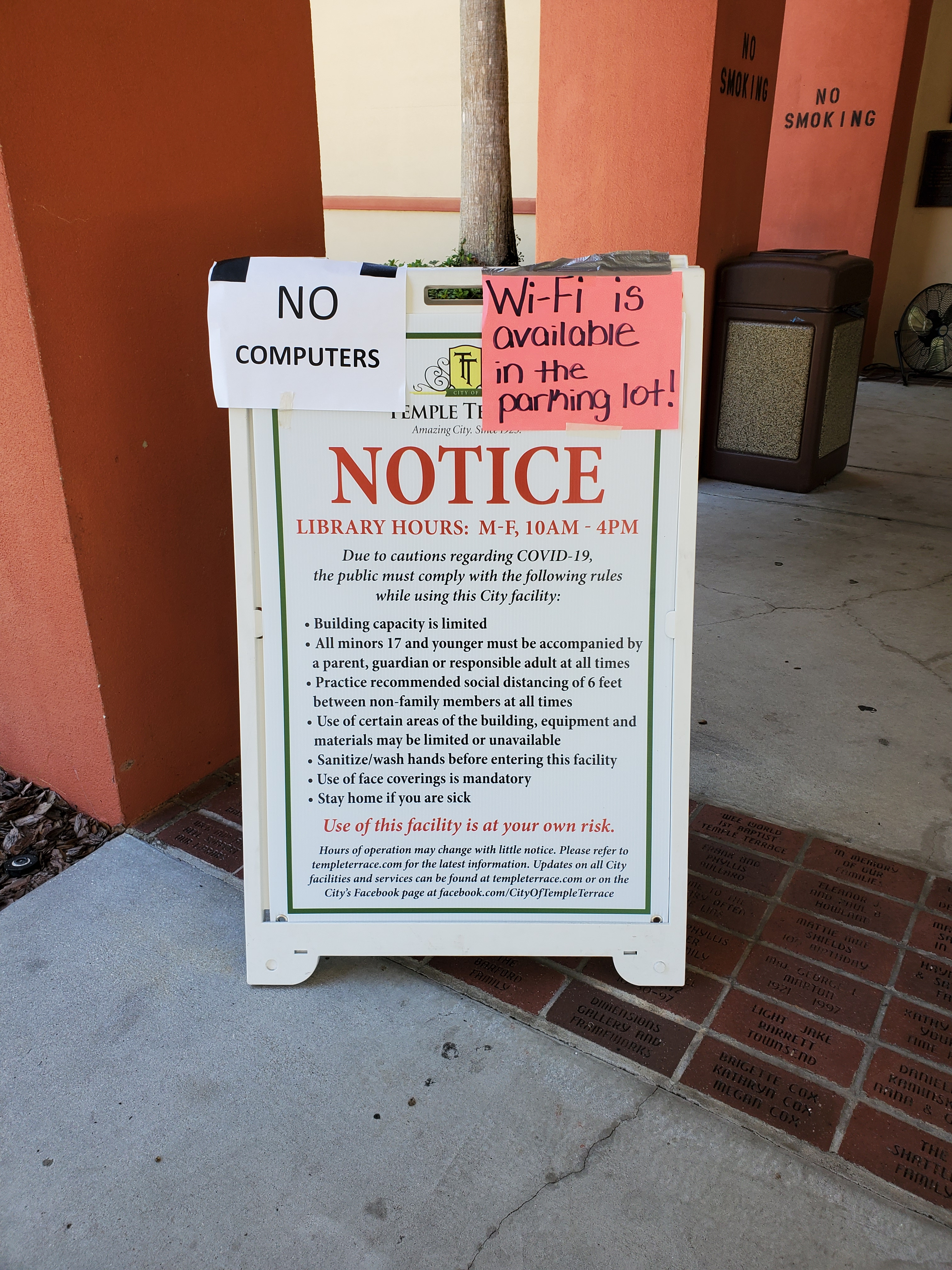
A sign near the entrance to the library informs patrons of rules during the COVID-19 pandemic.

In March 2020, all public libraries in Hillsborough County closed as a result of the COVID-19 pandemic. While other libraries in the Hillsborough County Public Library Collective remained closed, the Temple Terrace Public Library reopened on May 18, 2020. The following restrictions were in place during the first phase of reopening:

- Building capacity was limited.
- All patrons under the age of 18 needed to be accompanied by adults.
- Social distancing of six feet was required for non-family members.
- Use of certain materials and equipment was restricted, including computers, chairs, tables, and meeting rooms.
- Sanitizing hands was recommended to patrons before and after use of the facility.
- All patrons and staff were required to wear face coverings.
- Friends of the Library functions, including the Book Nook, were suspended.

Additionally, programming services typically offered in person were shifted to online settings, including children's story time and crafts, weekly teen "take and make" projects, and a virtual book club.

== Services ==
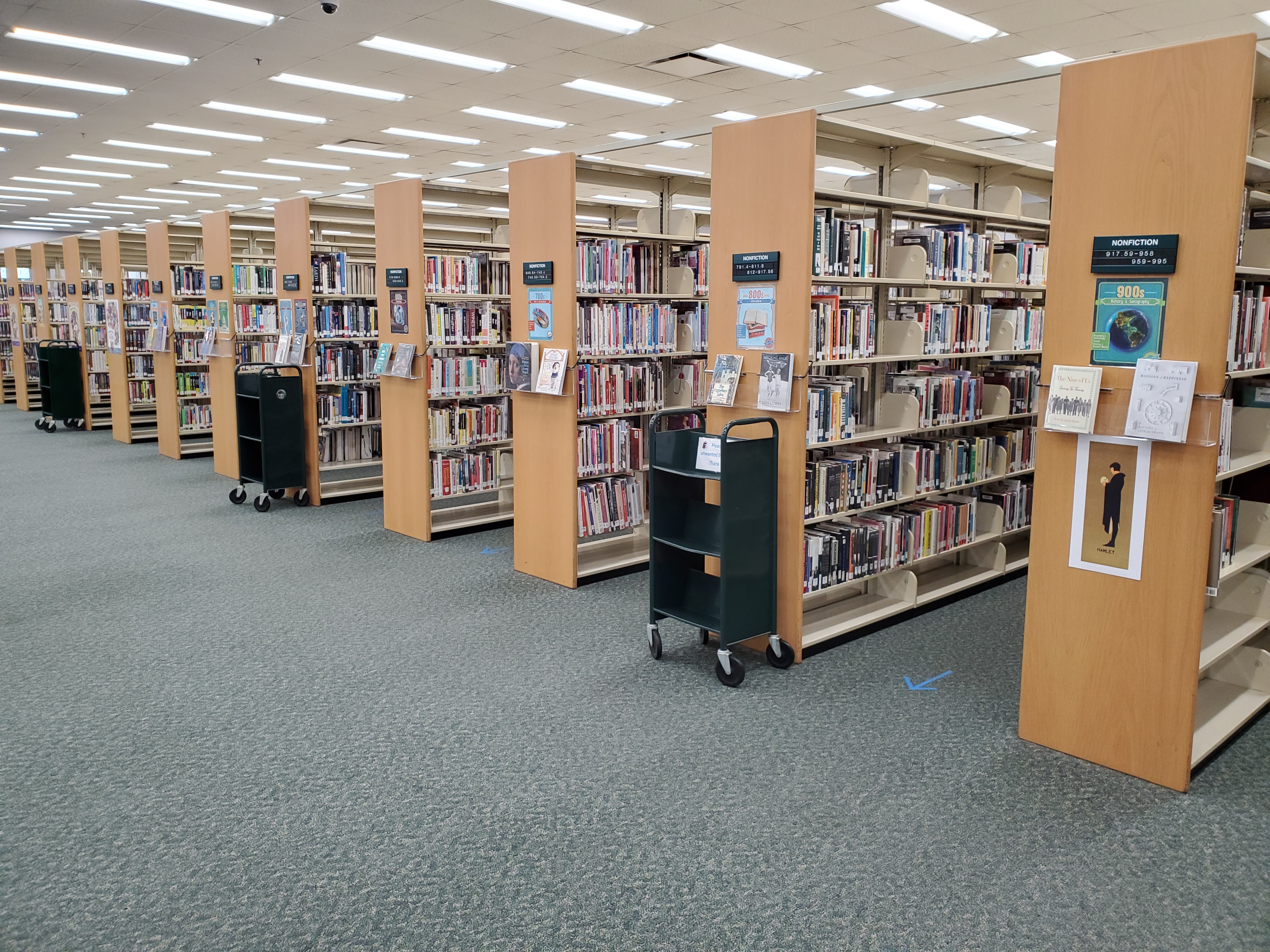
The adult non-fiction section of the library.

The mission statement of the city of Temple Terrace is "To deliver professional services to our community while promoting, protecting and preserving the heritage, natural resources and quality of life for future generations of our amazing city." Within this mission, the Temple Terrace Public Library has a goal of meeting "information and recreational needs of the residents of Temple Terrace and its surrounding environs by providing both print and non-print materials and engendering a lifelong love of reading and learning," while also striving "to broaden the horizons of its users, promote intellectual freedom, and provide for an enhanced quality of life." Services provided by the library and HCPLC include:

- Book, eBook, DVD, and CD loans
- Printing, copying, and 3D printing
- JAWS assistive technology for readers with visual impairments
- Desktop and laptop computers
- Events and classes for people of all ages
- Meeting rooms and study spaces
- Citizenship services
- A county-designated safe space for children
- Wi-Fi

Services that may not be readily available inside the home, such as 3-D printing, also come with details regarding how to utilize the technology through discussing the use of models, and instructions for contacting staff in the event of a patron needing assistance located on the Temple Terrace Website. The Temple Terrace website also offers a calendar for events that the library engages with, including for services from book clubs to extensive workshops regarding the beginnings and upkeep of the cultivation of homes and gardens, as well as crafts available on Mondays and hobbyists convening for fabric arts like knitting or crocheting two Fridays a month.

== See also ==
- Florida Library Association
- Tampa-Hillsborough County Public Library System
- Hillsborough County, Florida
- Temple Terrace, Florida
- Museum of Science & Industry (Tampa)
- Florida College
- University of South Florida
