= John F. Germany Public Library =

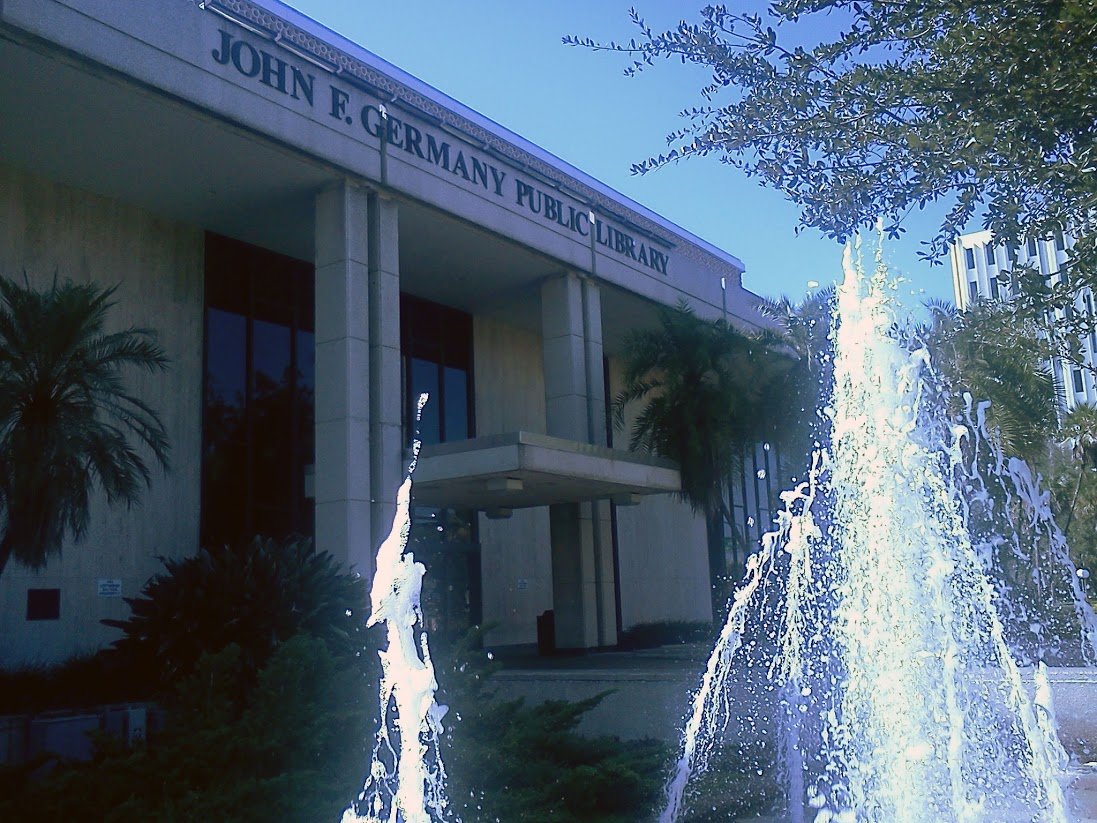
- Interactive map of the John F. Germany Public Library area

General information
- Type: Library
- Architectural style: Modernist
- Location: Tampa, Florida, 900 N. Ashley Drive
- Coordinates: 27.952547°N 82.464463°W
- Opened: April 21, 1968

Design and construction
- Architecture firm: McLane, Ranon, McIntosh & Bernardo and McElvy & Jennewein

Website
- https://hcplc.org/locations/john-f-germany

John F. Germany Public Library is the flagship library of the Tampa-Hillsborough County Public Library System (THPL). It is part of the Hillsborough County Public Library Cooperative and the Tampa Bay Library Consortium.

Located in Downtown Tampa, Florida, the 140,000 sq. ft. library acts as the central reference and resource center for THPL and its local library branch. John F. Germany Library is the largest in the THPL System and features a creative space known as the HIVE, which houses several special exhibits on history, genealogy, and more than 20,000 photographs. The library also features a children's play area and a station with more than 470 models, tools, and learning aids available for checkout.

== History ==
=== Carnegie Library ===
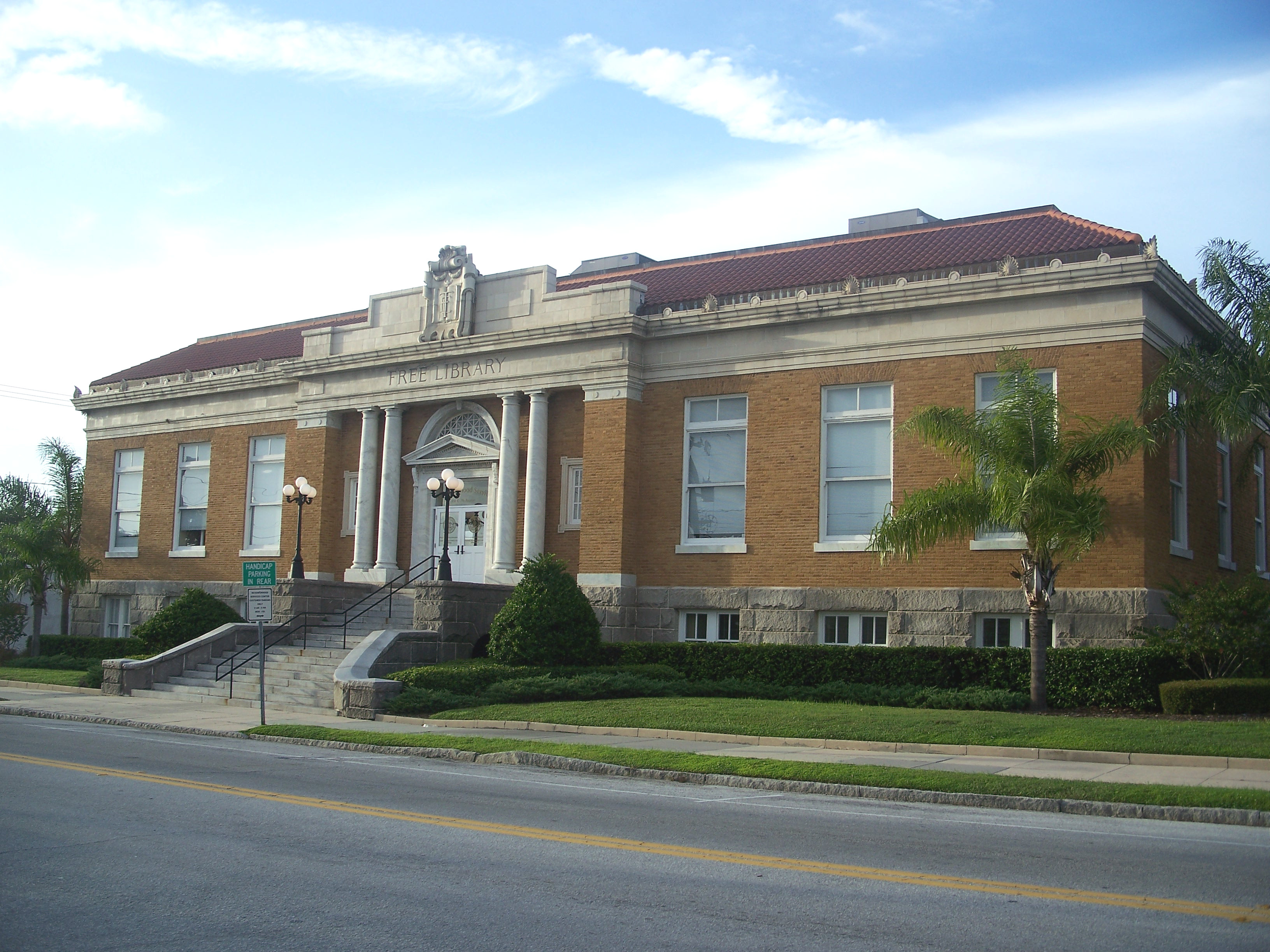
The original building of the Tampa Public Library, as it looked in 1917. There have been a few modifications to the building's exterior.

In 1912, the City of Tampa received a grant from the Carnegie Foundation to start development on a building for a main Tampa library on Seventh Avenue. Architect Fred J. James designed the building, and the physical work was completed on the facility on June 30, 1915. However, the opening of the facility was delayed for two years due to funding constraints. On April 17, 1917, the Tampa Public Library opened to the public with a collection of 3,800 books.

The Carnegie building on Seventh Avenue served as the main library's building until the need for a larger building became a necessity with the increase of population in Tampa to 400,000 people. The Tampa City Council, along with community aid, began plans for a new building. The new building, located less than one mile away from the original Carnegie building, began in 1965 and is still in use today.

=== New library and name change to John F. Germany ===
The new Tampa Public Library opened to the public on April 21, 1968. Designed by architectural firms McLane, Ranon, McIntosh & Bernardo, and McElvy & Jennewein, the new facility was 100,000 sq. ft. and held more than 500,000 books. Nine years later, a new 50,000 sq. ft addition was made to the original building. Designed by architectural firm McElvy, Jennewein, Stefany & Howard, the new addition was connected to the original building by an elevated glass walkway. This addition was dedicated on May 23, 1976.

The Tampa Public Library was renamed on November 1, 1999, to the John F. Germany Public Library in honor of library supporter, civic leader, and former judge, John F. Germany. In the 1960s, Germany was chairman of the Friends of the Library Organization while a sitting Hillsborough County circuit judge. After looking over the city budget he goes to the mayor to use funds from cigarette taxes to pay for the expansion plan. He once called the downtown library on Ashley Street his most significant accomplishment. It was there in February 2015, former John F. Germany Public Library Chief Director Andrew S. Breidenbaugh was named director of the Tampa-Hillsborough County Public Library System.

== The HIVE ==
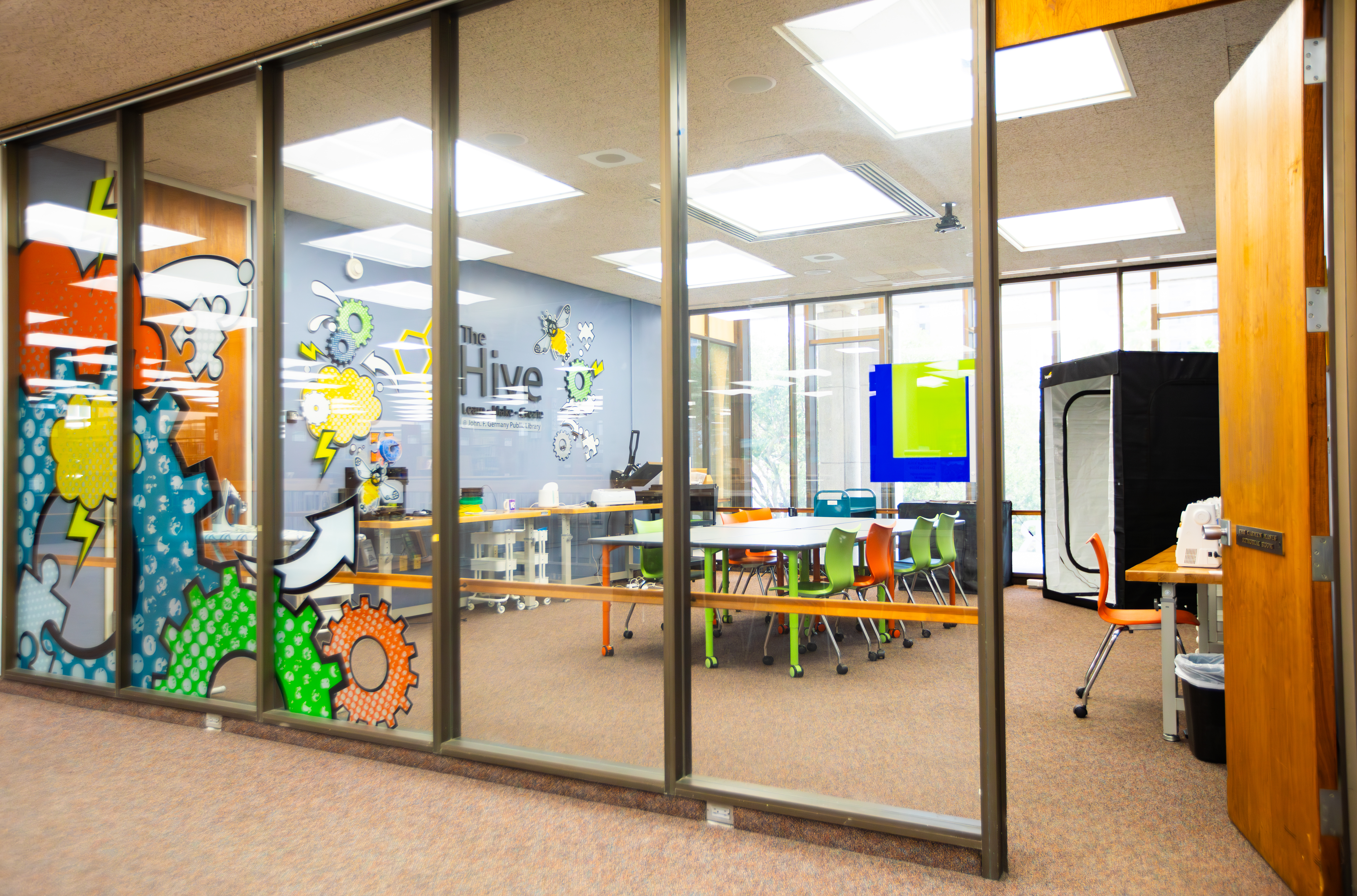
The Hive Makerspace at the John F. Germany Library is located on the 2nd floor of the library(2023).

Opened to the public on November 15, 2014, The HIVE was a 10,000 sq. ft. public community Makerspace originally located on the third floor of the West Building of the John F. Germany Public Library. In 2018, this building was closed and given back to the city of Tampa. The HIVE makerspace was moved inside the Germany Library and is now located on the second floor of the library.

- The Media:scape is a collaborative workspace featuring seating for 12 and a 42-inch display monitor with VGA, HDMI, and mini connectors.
- The Makerspace is a community workspace for building, tinkering, fabricating, and creating. Equipment includes two Makerbot Replicator 3D printers, Arduino Uno Boards & Accessories, Raspberry Pi kits, Little Bits Deluxe kits, Shapeoko 2 CNC milling machine, and work stations featuring hand tools, soldering irons, and glue guns.
- The Robotics Center is a workspace and scrimmage zone for school teams participating in FIRST, VEX, BEST, or any variety of robotics programs.
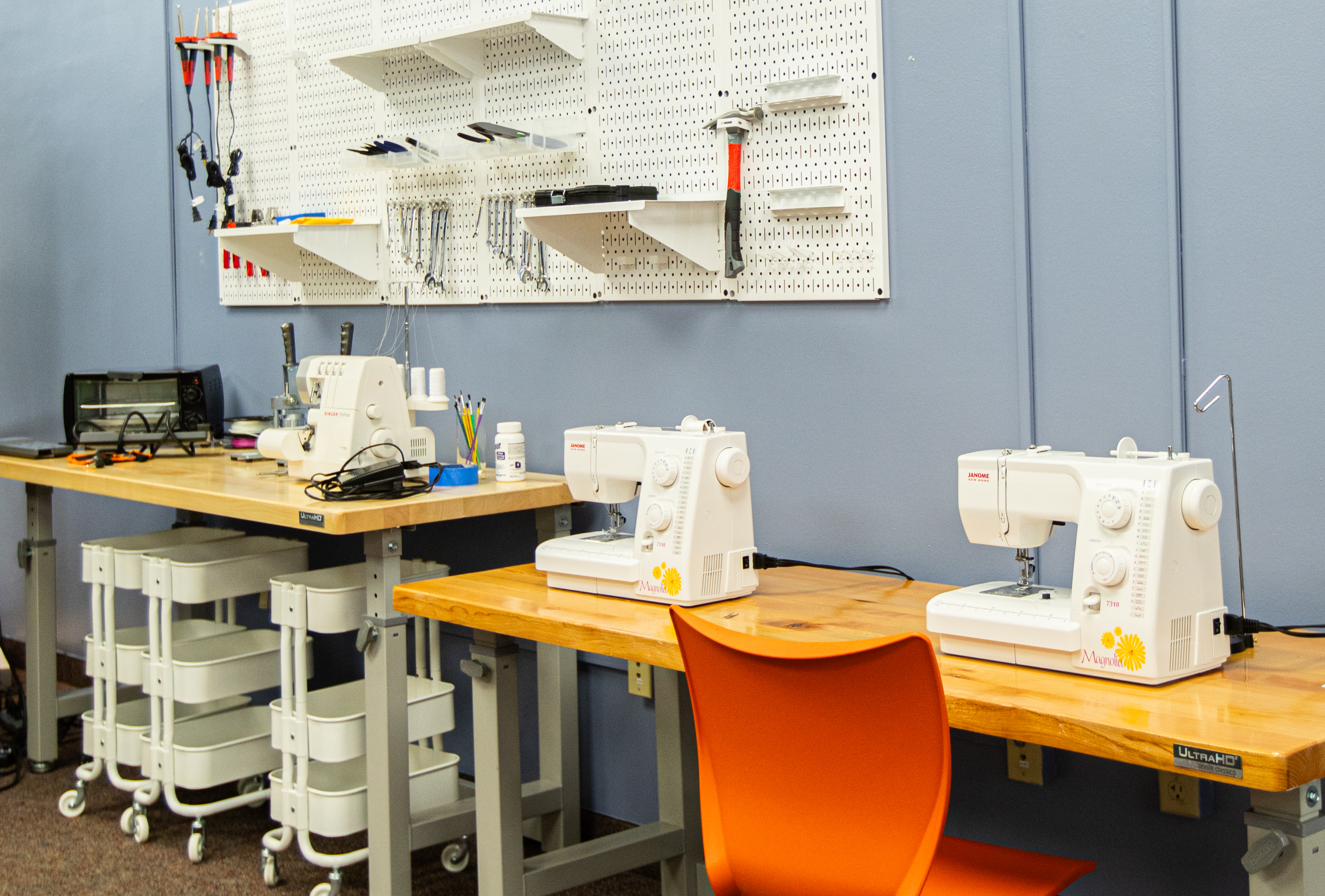
- Sewing machines at the Hive Makerspace(2023).
  The Arts Center is a space to work on all things arts and crafts, including painting, drawing, sculpting, scrapbooking, screenprinting, sewing, knitting, quilting, and embroidery. Equipment includes Singer sewing machines, Singer sergers, a Brother embroidery machine, an Accuquilt Go! fabric cutter, a Silhouette Cameo paper and vinyl cutter, and other sewing tools.
- The Recording Studio is a space available for booking equipment for recording and editing audio/video projects. Equipment includes a 27-inch iMac, a Chromakey green screen, a Canon camera with tripod, Behringer Mixer, wireless microphones, headphones, and more.
- The Flexspace is a multi-use space with seating for fifty, dual projectors with VGA and HDMI, tables, and whiteboards.

== Special collections and attributes ==
The John F. Germany Library houses a number of collection, many of which are offered both in person and electronically through the HCPLC's Digital Collections.

They have a permanent art collection, including the Bella Apollonia sculpture, and rotating exhibits in the Louise & Arnold Kotler Art Gallery on the second floor.

The Library also houses a Florida History Collection on the 4th Floor. These Special Collections include the over 20,000 photographs that are a part of the Burgert Brothers Photographic Collection, state and local government documents going as far back as 1967 held within the Government Documents Collection, and One of the largest genealogy collections in the southeastern United States.

The library also offers STEAM (Science, Technology, Engineering, Art and Mathematics) activities, training, or classes and participated in Fourth Friday, a Tampa initiative that had people in the community interact with what is offered in Downtown Tampa. The program was discontinued in 2022.

== More external links ==
- Florida History and Genealogy Library Blog (last updated November 2014)
