= List of people from Waukesha, Wisconsin =

The following list includes notable people who were born in or have lived in Waukesha, Wisconsin.

== Academics, authors, and journalists ==
- Tim Cahill, adventure travel writer
- Gordon Keith Chalmers, scholar
- John Thomas Curtis, ecologist
- David J. Eicher, editor and author
- Margo Huston, reporter who won the 1977 Pulitzer Prize for Breaking News Reporting
- Mary Schendlinger, writer and editor
- Robert R. Spitzer, agricultural researcher
- Michelle Thaller, astrophysicist
- Sidney Dean Townley, astronomer and geodeticist
- Vernor Vinge, science fiction author
- Ray Wendland, petrochemist
- Viola S. Wendt, poet

== Artists and performers ==
- Brad Beyer, actor
- Frank Caliendo, comedian
- Carmen De La Paz, television personality
- Danny Gokey, American Idol contestant
- Sue Hawk, reality television personality
- Drew Kunz, artist and poet
- Johnny Lechner, actor
- Sam Llanas, musician
- Mark Mallman, musician
- Kurt Neumann, musician
- Les Paul, guitarist and inventor
- Rose Polenzani, folk musician
- Michael Ritchie, film director
- Heidi Stober, opera singer
- Nick Viall, reality television personality
- Hayward Williams, musician

== Athletes ==
=== American Football ===
- John Anderson, NFL player for the Green Bay Packers
- Erik Bickerstaff, NFL player for the Dallas Cowboys and Oakland Raiders
- Dick Blanchard, NFL player for the New England Patriots
- Max Broadhurst, NFL player for the Dayton Triangles
- Chuck DeShane, NFL player for the Detroit Lions
- Terry Dillon, NFL player for the Minnesota Vikings and Oakland Raiders
- John Golemgeske, NFL player for the Brooklyn Dodgers
- Pat Harder, NFL player for the Detroit Lions and Arizona Cardinals
- Frank Harris, NFL player for the Chicago Bears
- Frank Hertz, NFL player for the Milwaukee Badgers
- Matt Katula, NFL player for the Pittsburgh Steelers
- Ken Keuper, NFL player for the Green Bay Packers and New York Giants
- Kurt Larson, NFL player for the Indianapolis Colts and Green Bay Packers
- Will McDonald IV, NFL player for the New York Jets
- Bill Miklich, NFL player for the New York Giants and Detroit Lions
- Joe Schobert, NFL player for the Jacksonville Jaguars and Pittsburgh Steelers
- Bill Stetz, NFL player for the Philadelphia Eagles
- Derek Watt, NFL player for the Pittsburgh Steelers
- J. J. Watt, NFL player for the Houston Texans and Arizona Cardinals
- T. J. Watt, NFL player for the Pittsburgh Steelers
- Kevin Zeitler, NFL player for the Baltimore Ravens

=== Baseball ===
- Jack Kading, MLB player for the Pittsburgh Pirates
- Jarred Kelenic, MLB player for the Seattle Mariners
- Jim Pruett, MLB player for the Philadelphia Athletics

=== Other ===
- Austin Aries, professional wrestler
- Mike Cahill, tennis player
- Paul Hamm, Olympic gymnastic gold medalist
- Morgan Hamm, Olympic gymnast
- Kirstin Holum, speed ice skater
- Mary Beth Iagorashvili, Olympic pentathlete
- Gwen Jorgensen, 2014 World Triathlon Series Champion
- Ulvis Katlaps, ice hockey player
- Lauri Merten, professional golfer and winner of the 1993 U.S. Women's Open
- Nick Moon, soccer player
- Melissa Mueller, Olympic pole vaulter
- Elli Ochowicz, Olympic Speed Skater
- Leslie Osborne, U.S. women's national soccer team
- John Pearson, Olympic gymnast
- Erik Sowinski, middle-distance runner
- Lester Stevens, Olympic athlete
- Tim Ward, soccer player for the Chicago Fire of Major League Soccer
- Mitchell Whitmore, Olympic speedskater

== Business People ==
- Donald Goerke, inventor of SpaghettiOs
- Richard W. Sears, founder of Sears and Roebuck

== Military Personnel ==
- Miriam Ben-Shalom, activist and former staff sergeant
- Joseph E. Carberry, aviator
- Alfred Gorham, Tuskegee Airman
- Michael J. Schwerin, U.S. Navy rear admiral
- John Patten Story, U.S. Army major general

== Politicians and Government Officials ==
=== Wisconsin State Legislators ===
- Roderick Ainsworth, Wisconsin State Representative
- Scott Allen, Wisconsin State Representative
- Winchel Bacon, Wisconsin State Representative
- Silas Barber, Wisconsin State Representative
- William Blair, Wisconsin State Senator
- John F. Buckley, Wisconsin legislator and lawyer
- Phineas Clawson, Wisconsin State Senator
- Dave Craig, Wisconsin State Representative and Senator
- David L. Dancey, Wisconsin State Legislator and jurist
- J. Mac Davis, jurist and Wisconsin State Senator
- Elihu Enos, educator and Wisconsin state legislator
- William A. Freehoff, Wisconsin State Senator
- Joseph J. Hadfield, Wisconsin state legislator
- Joanne Huelsman, Wisconsin State Representative and Senator
- Edward Jackamonis, speaker of the Wisconsin State Assembly
- Scott Jensen, speaker of the Wisconsin State Assembly
- Alfred M. Jones, Illinois State Representative and Wisconsin State Senator
- Edwin B. Kelsey, Wisconsin State Representative
- Joel Kleefisch, Wisconsin State Representative
- Bill Kramer, Wisconsin State Representative
- William Langer, Wisconsin State Representative
- Vincent R. Mathews, Wisconsin State Representative
- Ernst Merton, Wisconsin State Senator and lawyer
- Roger P. Murphy, Wisconsin State Senator and jurist
- Scott Newcomer, Wisconsin State Representative
- Alexander Randall, Wisconsin governor
- Jon Richards, Wisconsin State Representative and circuit court judge
- John C. Schober, Wisconsin State Representative and lawyer
- Ellicott R. Stillman, Wisconsin State Representative
- Daniel H. Sumner, Wisconsin State Representative
- Vernon Tichenor, Wisconsin State Representative
- Henry Totten, Wisconsin State Representative and businessman
- Joseph Turner, Wisconsin Territorial and State Senator
- Daniel P. Vrakas, Wisconsin State Representative
- John M. Wells, Wisconsin State Representative
- E. B. West, Wisconsin State Senator
- John W. Whelan, Wisconsin State Representative and Senator
- George Winans, Wisconsin State Representative

=== Other ===
- William A. Barstow, Governor of Wisconsin, Union Army general
- William G. Callow, Wisconsin Supreme Court
- Eugene W. Chafin, Prohibition Party Presidential candidate
- Glenn R. Davis, U.S. Representative
- Lee S. Dreyfus, Governor of Wisconsin
- Daniel Hoan, Mayor of Milwaukee
- Edmund C. Moy, businessman and U.S. Mint director
- Edwin M. Randall, Chief Justice of the Florida Supreme Court
- Paul F. Reilly, Judge of the Wisconsin Court of Appeals
- Eleazer Root, Episcopal priest and local politician
- Donald E. Tewes, U.S. Representative
- Tom Tillberry, Minnesota State Representative
- Robert William Wright, lawyer and politician

== Other ==
- Little Lord Fauntleroy, unidentified homicide victim found in 1921
- Deb Hoffmann, collector
- Florence E. Kollock (1848–1925), Universalist minister and lecturer
- Anissa Weier and Morgan Geyser, convicted in Waukesha's infamous Slender Man stabbing case
- Zuza Beine (2011–2025), American social media personality

== See also ==
- Waukesha, Wisconsin
- List of people from Wisconsin
