= Eliphalet Stone (Wisconsin politician) =

19th century American politician

Member of the Wisconsin State Assembly from the Waukesha 1st district
- In office January 1, 1872 – January 6, 1873
- Preceded by: Leonard Hinkley
- Succeeded by: Francis G. Parks

Personal details
- Born: April 10, 1825 Sodus Point, New York, U.S.
- Died: December 8, 1905 (aged 80) Summit, Waukesha County, Wisconsin, U.S.
- Resting place: Summit Cemetery, Summit
- Party: Republican
- Spouse: Nancy McWhorter (m. 1852)
- Children: Percy Frederick Stone^{(b. 1854; died 1939)}; Ella (Leavitt)^{(b. 1856; died 1935)}; Jennie L. (Kimball)^{(b. 1859; died 1908)}; Frank Paul Stone^{(b. 1860; died 1929)}; Louis J. Stone^{(b. 1867; died 1950)}; Alice B. Stone^{(b. 1871; died 1966)}
- Relatives: George McWhorter (father-in-law)
- Occupation: Shipmaster, farmer

Eliphalet Stephens Stone (April 10, 1825 – December 8, 1905) was an American shipmaster, farmer, politician, and Wisconsin pioneer. He served one term in the Wisconsin State Assembly, representing the southern half of Waukesha County in the 1872 term.

== Biography ==
Eliphalet Stone was born in Sodus Point, New York, in 1825. For the first fourteen years of his life, he worked on his father's farm and attended common schools. In 1840, he began to sail on Lake Ontario.

In 1842, at age 17, he settled in Milwaukee, Wisconsin Territory, to set out on his own. He set out on foot to Brookfield, where he was hired by Jacob Suttin to work in rail-making. With his earnings, he attempted to make a land claim, but was not allowed due to his young age. In 1843, he returned to Milwaukee and was employed again as a sailor, this time on the ship of Calvin Ripley. Ripley routinely ferried lumber between Milwaukee and Manistee, Michigan.

After sailing for two seasons, he purchased Ripley's farm in the town of Greenfield, but continued to work in sailing for several more years. Due to his interest in sailing, he became one of the first members of the Milwaukee Board of Trade in 1853, serving on the board for over 30 years.

In 1857, he bought his estate on the eastern shore of Silver Lake, known as "Cedar Beach". He resided on this farm in the town of Summit for much of the rest of his life.

Stone served on the Summit Town Board and on the Waukesha County Board of Supervisors. In 1871, Stone was elected to the Wisconsin State Assembly, running on the Republican Party ticket. He died at his home on Silver Lake in Waukesha County, Wisconsin.

== Personal life and family ==
Eliphalet Stone was one of at least four children born to Hinman and Mary (née Stevens) Stone. They were both natives of Connecticut who became early pioneers of Wayne County, New York.

In 1852, he married Nancy McWhorter, a daughter of Waukesha County pioneer George McWhorter. They had six children together.

Wisconsin State Assembly
Preceded by Leonard Hinkley	Member of the Wisconsin State Assembly from the Waukesha 1st district January 1, 1872 – January 6, 1873	Succeeded by Francis G. Parks
