= Emmaus Bible College =

Emmaus Bible College can refer to:

- Emmaus Baptist College in Brandon, Florida
- Emmaus Bible College (Australia)
- Emmaus University, formerly Emmaus Bible College (Iowa)
