= Tampa Hillsborough Expressway Authority =

Regional expressway authority based in Hillsborough County, Florida

The Tampa Hillsborough Expressway Authority (THEA) owns, operates and maintains the Lee Roy Selmon Expressway in Tampa. The Selmon Expressway is a tolled highway. The Reversible Express Lanes (REL), a highway within a highway, runs in the middle on the eastern side of the highway with two non-tolled feeder roads, Brandon Parkway in Brandon and Meridian Avenue in Tampa, providing the entrance and exit to the REL. Additionally, THEA owns and operates the Selmon Greenway, a multipurpose recreational pathway running beneath and alongside the Lee Roy Selmon Expressway.

THEA was established by statute in 1963 (pursuant to Fla. Stat. § 348.0001 et seq.). THEA was established as a way to bring roadway infrastructure projects online sooner than with conventional department of transportation funding, with the first roadway opening in 1973.

THEA originally planned the neighboring Veteran's Expressway; however, Florida's Turnpike Enterprise actually built the project.

The state legislature has attempted to shut down THEA on numerous occasions during its history and transfer ownership to the Florida's Turnpike Enterprise. The most recent attempt occurred in March, 2011 when the legislature attempted to pass a bill that would eliminate THEA, the Orlando-Orange County Expressway Authority, and Mid-Bay Bridge Authority ostensibly to save the state money. The plan was later abandoned when the state's budget was written .

== Timeline ==
Since its establishment, THEA has been responsible for development of numerous roadway projects in Hillsborough County.

- 1970s–1980s: THEA designed and built the original South Crosstown Expressway in 1974 (5 miles in length) and extended it in 1979 and 1985. By 1986, the Crosstown Expressway totaled 15 miles in length and connected South Tampa to Downtown Tampa and east to Interstate 75.
- 1980s: During the early 1980s, THEA planned, designed and began purchasing right-of-way for construction of the Veterans Expressway project. The project was eventually constructed and is now operated by the Florida's Turnpike Enterprise.
- July 17, 1985: Paul Raymond Speer chosen as the Executive Director
- February 1, 1996: Patrick J. McCue chosen as the Executive Director
- 1996: THEA began planning the Brandon feeder roads which eventually became the Brandon Parkway, a 3.5-mile system of non-tolled feeder and circulation roads in eastern Hillsborough County. Construction of this project was completed in 2004. In addition to providing much needed capacity and access, the roadway also features a heavily landscaped park-like setting with urban architecture and a recreational trail.
- 1998–2006: THEA began planning the Reversible Express Lanes project, a ten-mile long set of reversible lanes from Brandon to downtown Tampa, most of which is constructed on a concrete segmental bridge in the Expressway median. Designed to save the expressway corridor for future transportation needs, the bridge was completed in 2006 and is now in operation. The project ran one year behind schedule because of an incident related to a foundation design flaw that resulted in the collapse of a bridge section during construction. The Authority settled a lawsuit with URS Corporation for $65 million for design and construction management issues related to the incident.
- 1999: The Crosstown Expressway is renamed the Lee Roy Selmon Expressway
- 2000: THEA (along with FDOT and Florida's Turnpike) began planning for what is now known as the I-4/Selmon Expressway Connector, an innovative, elevated route that would safely channel truck cargo traffic from I-4 to the Port of Tampa. Construction of the Connector has begun and was completed in 2014.
- 2005–2007: In cooperation with the City of Tampa, THEA advertised for private concessionaires to construct the East-West Road (a City project) from New Tampa to I-275. The East-West Road is actually the remnants of the failed Lutz Expressway, which was originally part of the Northwest Hillsborough Expressway. In 2007, this project was deemed too costly to proceed.
- March 2006: THEA opens the Meridian Gateway project into the Channel District of Downtown Tampa. This $50 Million construction of a new boulevard into the City that includes unique urban architecture, street and pedestrian lighting and landscaping has become a catalyst for more than $1 Billion in new investment in the downtown urban core.
- May 2006: THEA restarted efforts on the beltway system to provide a much-needed bypass of downtown Tampa for many trips that are needlessly forced through the downtown area by the current roadway system. The beltway would also provide service to the extremely large suburban areas that already exist on the periphery of the city as well as the 400,000 of new population that is already being planned for the next twenty years in Hillsborough County. In 2007, this project was tabled.
- July 2006 – August 2006: The Reversible Express Lanes opened to traffic.
- November 1, 2006: The Florida Turnpike Enterprise, in cooperation with THEA, began a new toll program called Pay-by-Plate. The program is designed to allow non-transponder customers to use the Reversible Express Lanes, without having to purchase a SunPass. The program uses a network of high resolution cameras along the expressway to create snapshots of a license plate. Commuters who sign up for the pre-paid program have the toll deducted from their account. This program is not currently being offered by the Expressway.
- November 13, 2006: THEA interim director, Ralph Mervine resigns amid harsh controversy.
- July 10, 2007: Joseph C. Waggoner Jr. is chosen as the new executive director of THEA. Waggoner was previously the Maryland Transportation Authority's planning and development chief.
- July 28, 2008: THEA unveils a brand new logo for the Selmon Expressway, which is slated to replace all existing logos along the thoroughfare.
- November 2009: Work begins on the I-4/Selmon Connector highway between the Selmon Expressway and I-4.
- Spring 2010: THEA announced that it would end staffed toll collection on the Selmon Expressway and transition to an open-road tolling system on the entire thoroughfare. Customers drive on the expressway and pass under gantries that hold the tolling equipment. If a customer does not have a SunPass transponder, THEA bundles the tolls and send the customer a monthly bill.
- January 2014: The I-4/Selmon Connector between the Selmon Expressway and I-4 opened January 3, 2014 to traffic.
- May 2015: The Selmon Greenway opened. The Selmon Greenway is a pedestrian-friendly, urban green path that runs through downtown Tampa. The Greenway connects several popular neighborhoods of Tampa, including Ybor City, Channelside, and Water Street with the Riverwalk.
- September 2015: THEA received award from U.S. Department of Transportation to begin working with them as a Connected Vehicle (CV) Pilot site.
- May 2017: Deputy Kotfila Memorial Dog Park opened. This is THEA's first Selmon Greenway Pocket Park, and it is located at 626 N. Raymond Avenue, underneath the Selmon Expressway behind the Bell Channelside Apartments.
- December 2017: Selmon Extension groundbreaking. The extension is a 1.9-mile toll lane located in the median of Gandy Boulevard, which gives a choice for local residents and regional travelers: use Gandy Boulevard for local destinations or use the Selmon Extension for a direct connection to the Selmon Expressway or the Gandy Bridge.
- 2018: Shop Gandy business support campaign launched to help businesses along the Gandy Boulevard corridor before, during and after the construction of the Selmon Extension.
- October 2019: Inducted into the ITS World Congress Hall of Fame. The Awards recognize individuals, industries, and local governments striving to set the bar higher and enhance the end-user experience. Local solutions often have broader applications, ensuring international transport, safety, and technology improvements, enhancing livability in cities and communities.
- May 2019: In cooperation with the Society of Automotive Engineers (SAE) International, THEA successfully conducted the first-ever publicly accessible autonomous vehicle demonstration rides in Tampa, Florida.
- 2020: South Selmon Safety Project completed. The South Selmon Safety Project enhances driver safety by constructing a concrete barrier wall in the median of the Lee Roy Selmon Expressway between Hillsborough River and Himes Avenue.
- April 19, 2021: After three years of construction, the Selmon Extension opened on April 19, 2021.
- February 1, 2022: Gregory Slater is chosen as the new CEO/Executive Director of THEA. Slater previously served as the Secretary of the Maryland Department of Transportation (MDOT.)

== Awards ==
2022

- ACEC Florida Engineering Excellence Grand Conceptor Award
- National Recognition Award at the ACEC 2022 Engineering Excellence Awards
- Places 5th in the Roads & Bridges in America
- TBRPC Future of the Region Award in Transportation & Mobility

2021

- CMAA Florida Project Achievement Award in Transportation
- IBTTA Toll Excellence Award in Operations, Engineering & Maintenance
- SLAG Cement in Sustainable Concrete Project of the Year
- Hillsborough County Planning Commission Planning & Design Award
- FTBA Best in Construction, Expressway Authority Project of the Year
- GTSITE Project Project of the Year
- ASBI Bridge Award of Excellence
- TEAMFL Inaugural Bob Hartnett Leadership Award

2020

- Creative Loafing Best of the Bay: Best Dog Park

2019

- IBTTA Marketing & Communications Award
- THEA CV Pilot is inducted into the ITS World Congress Hall of Fame

2018

- Hillsborough County Planning Commission Award of Merit
- IBTTA Toll Excellence Awards Certificate of Merit
- TBRPC Future of the Region Awards Certificate of Regional Excellence
- Tampa Downtown Partnership Urban Excellence Award

2017

- Hillsborough County Planning Commission Planning & Design Award
- Tampa Downtown Partnership Public Sector Project Award

2016

- Hillsborough County Planning Commission Planning & Design Award

2015

- Tampa Downtown Partnership Recognition of Excellence

2014

- U.S. Department of Energy Clean Cities Tampa Bay Recognition

2013

- Hillsborough County Board of County Commissioners Certificate of Commendation

2012

- U.S. Department of Transportation Federal Highway Administration & Roadway Safety Foundation National Roadway Safety Award

2011

- Florida Public Relations Association Award of Distinction

2007

- American Council of Engineering Companies Engineering Excellence Award
- American Segmental Bridge Institute Award of Excellence
- IBTTA Toll Excellence Operational Award
- IBTTA President's Top Project Award
