= I-4/Selmon Expressway Connector =

Toll road in Tampa, Florida

- Crosstown Connector
- I-4/Selmon Expressway Connector highlighted in red

Route information
- Maintained by FDOT
- Length: 2.0 mi (3.2 km) longest movement (I-4 east to Port of Tampa)
- Existed: January 6, 2014–present

Major junctions
- South end: SR 618 in Tampa
- North end: I-4 in Tampa

Location
- Country: United States
- State: Florida
- Counties: Hillsborough

Highway system
- Florida State Highway System; Interstate; US; State; Former; Pre‑1945; Toll; Scenic

The I-4/Selmon Expressway Connector (also known as the Crosstown Connector) is a controlled-access toll road between I-4, the Lee Roy Selmon Expressway (SR 618), and the Port of Tampa east of Ybor City in the city of Tampa, Florida. It primarily comprises four parallel one-way roadways west of 31st Street, continuously elevated over local streets, railroads, and vacant land, with a SunPass/toll-by-plate electronic toll gantry spanning the structure near the southern end. All movements were opened to traffic on January 6, 2014, and the direct connections to the Port of Tampa are signed as Truck Routes.

The connector project is maintained by the Florida Department of Transportation (FDOT), and was constructed by FDOT in coordination with Florida's Turnpike Enterprise (FTE) and the Tampa-Hillsborough Expressway Authority (THEA). Construction began in March 2010 and was completed in January 2014. It was one of the largest single recipients of the 2009 Federal Stimulus funding grants. It currently has no signed or unsigned state road number.

== Route description ==
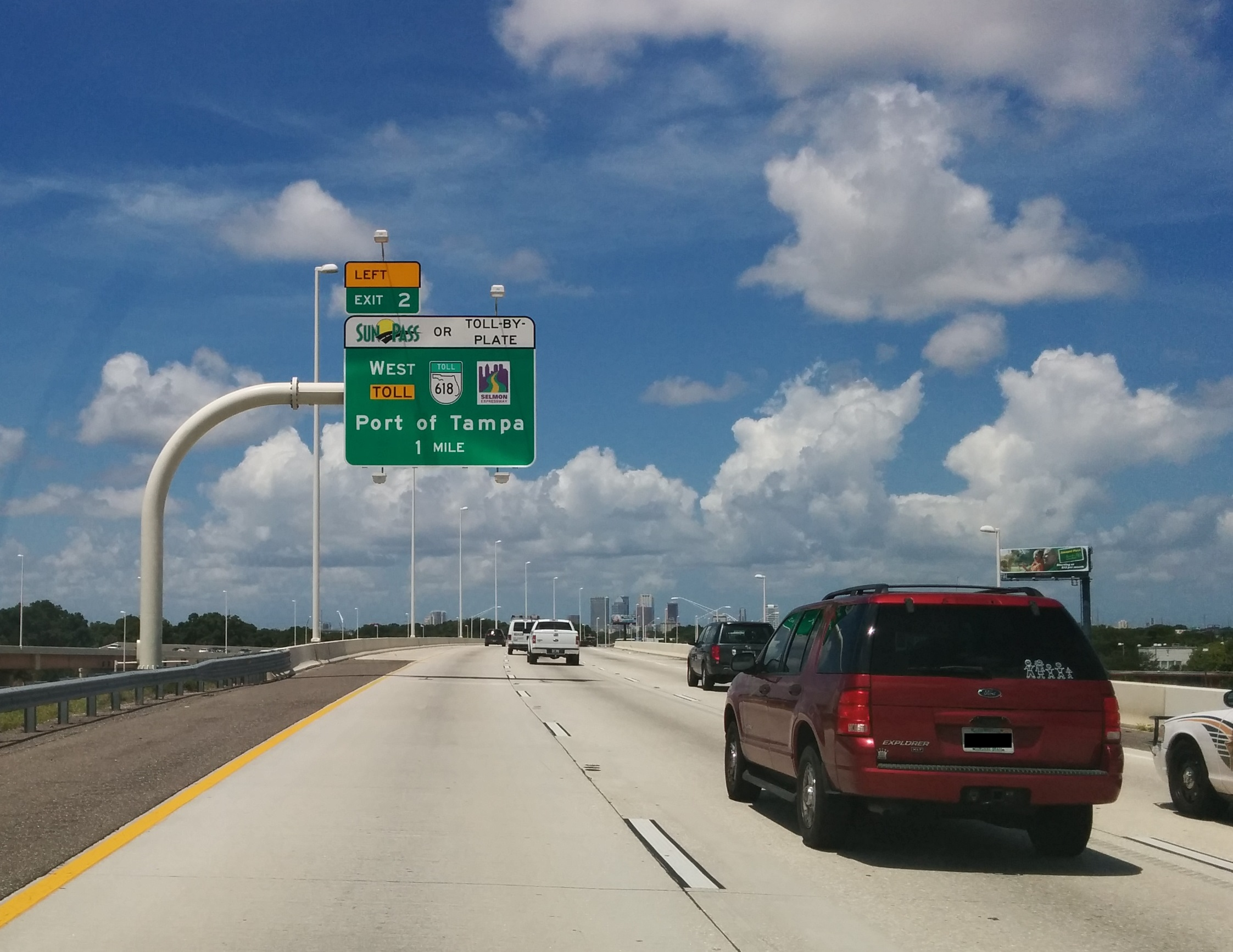
Approaching the Selmon exit on westbound I-4

To minimize dangerous weaving patterns and major bottlenecks, traffic utilizing the I-4/Selmon Expressway Connector between I-4 and eastbound Selmon Expressway to/from Brandon is physically separated from traffic utilizing the connector to get to/from Downtown Tampa via I-4 westbound. The entire tollway is elevated.

Traffic traveling along eastbound I-4 from I-275 is able to transition onto the eastbound Selmon going to Brandon with access to 50th St being maintained. Eastbound Selmon commuters coming from South Tampa can connect to eastbound I-4 to travel to I-75 North, as well as Lakeland, Orlando, and other points northeastward. For westbound traffic, access to the westbound Selmon, as well as access to 22nd/21st Streets, are provided. Commuters wishing to travel to I-275, Temple Terrace, and Tampa International Airport can access westbound I-4 via the westbound Selmon. Commuters wishing to avoid the gridlock at the I-4 / I-275 interchange, colloquially named "Malfunction Junction," can use the Connector as an alternate route towards St. Petersburg.

Cargo traffic to the Port of Tampa (now known as the Port of Tampa Bay) is heavily recommended to use the "Truck Route" ramps of the Connector, as they safely channel truck cargo traffic to and from the Port without burdening Ybor City. Access to the cargo lanes is provided from both directions of I-4. The Port entry ramp disperses at 20th St, just south of Durham St, and likewise, trucks exiting the port can access either direction of I-4 via the slip ramp from 22nd St, just north of Durham St.

Because the Selmon's Reversible Express Lanes (or REL) were specifically designed for traffic traveling between Brandon and Downtown Tampa, no access is available from the REL to I-4. Commuters wishing to use the Connector have to use the ground-level "Local Lanes" of the Selmon. Stub ramps were built at the northern ends of the Connector to allow for additional access points to I-4 should traffic conditions warrant. The northern interchange can be easily reconfigured to allow for access onto "Local Lanes" of I-4, as well as planned Managed Lanes (or "Express Lanes") as part of the Tampa Bay Express project.

== Tolls ==
Overhead toll gantries on the highway eliminates the need for toll plazas, as Florida's Turnpike is making such gantries standard for all new toll facilities. SunPass and the "We Bill You" (Toll-by-Plate) program is utilized. The toll rate for trucks (regardless of direction and number of axles), and cars traveling from westbound I-4 to westbound Selmon is $1.05 for SunPass customers and $1.31 for "We Bill You"/Toll-by-Plate. The toll rate for cars traveling from eastbound Selmon to eastbound I-4 is $0.53 for SunPass customers and $0.78 for "We Bill You"/Toll-by-Plate. An additional $2.50 Administration fee is billed for "We Bill You"/Toll-by-Plate.

== History ==
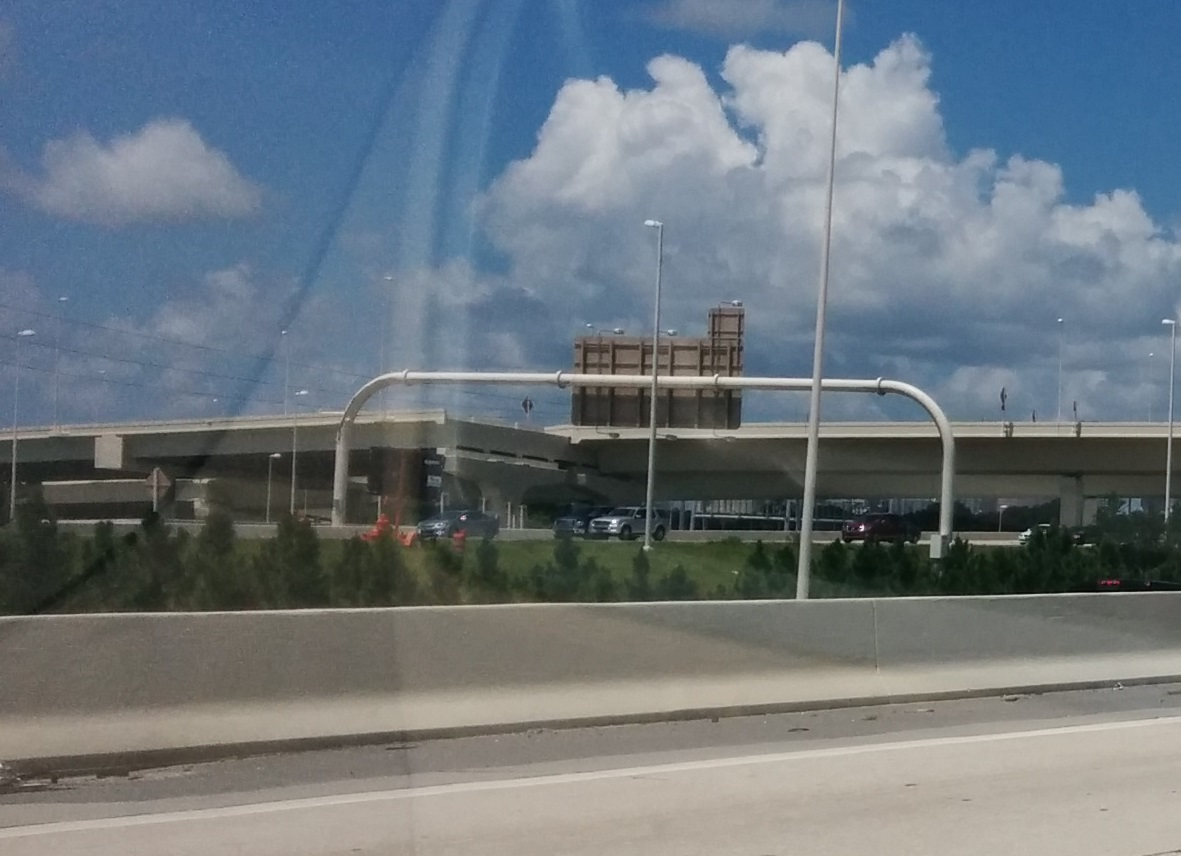
A stub ramp on the north side of the connector. When express toll lanes are added to the median of I-4, the existing ramp to the median will connect with the westbound express lanes, while a new bridge will connect this stub to non-tolled lanes of westbound I-4.

The I-4–Selmon Expressway Connector was originally conceived in the 1980s as a high-speed route between South Tampa (to include MacDill Air Force Base) and Orlando, as well as from Lutz to Brandon. It also serves to divert commercial traffic and hazardous cargo from Ybor’s historic district. Planning for the project was completed in late 2008, with funding secured in the summer of 2009. Despite falling gas tax revenues and the ongoing global recession, THEA was able to obtain about $105 million for the $487 million project from the American Recovery and Reinvestment Act of 2009, allowing the project to begin construction in March 2010. The remaining funds will be paid off over time with a $1.25 toll for traffic The projected time of completion was set around 2014; it was hoped that the highway could open as soon as early 2013, however in May 2013 the opening date was set as "by December 31".

On December 28, 2013, a 5k run was held to celebrate the opening of the connector to vehicular traffic. The revised target date to open the connector to vehicular traffic was Friday, January 3, 2014, but was pushed back to Monday, January 6, 2014, due to inclement weather. The highway was able to open on the morning of January 6, 2014, despite heavy fog in the area.

Despite relatively light traffic during parts of the day, FDOT has reported that the number of cargo trucks using the Connector is averaging 1,600 per day since its January 6 opening.
