= George McWhorter (Wisconsin politician) =

19th century American politician

Coroner of Waukesha County, Wisconsin
- In office January 1, 1859 – January 1, 1861
- Preceded by: Ira Rowe
- Succeeded by: William M. Saunders

Member of the Wisconsin State Assembly from the Waukesha 4th district
- In office January 4, 1858 – January 3, 1859
- Preceded by: Elihu Enos
- Succeeded by: Charles T. Deissner

Personal details
- Born: 1793 Salem, New York, U.S.
- Died: January 19, 1867 (aged 73–74)
- Resting place: Prairie Home Cemetery, Waukesha
- Party: Republican
- Spouses: Mary Lytle (m. 1815; died 1845); Thetis (Johnson) Smith (m. 1854–1867)
- Children: Mary T. (Humphrey)^{(b. 1823; died 1856)}; Andrew L. McWhorter^{(b. 1817; died 1904)}; Adams Lytle McWhorter^{(b. 1824; died 1900)}; George H. McWhorter Jr.^{(b. 1828; died 1899)}; Nancy (Stone)^{(b. 1833)}
- Relatives: George M. Humphrey (son-in-law); Eliphalet S. Stone (son-in-law)

Military service
- Allegiance: United States
- Branch/service: New York Militia
- Years of service: 1812–1815
- Rank: Ensign
- Unit: 50th New York Militia Reg. (McCleary's Regiment)
- Battles/wars: War of 1812

George H. McWhorter Sr. (1793 – January 19, 1867) was an American farmer, Republican politician, and Wisconsin pioneer. He served one term in the Wisconsin State Assembly, representing Waukesha County during the 1858 term. He was also coroner of Waukesha County for two years. His name was at least once misspelled "McQuarter".

== Biography ==
George McWhorter was born in Salem, New York, in 1793. As a young man, he enrolled in the New York Militia for service in the War of 1812. He served as an ensign in the 50th New York militia regiment (Colonel John McCleary's regiment).

He came west to the Wisconsin Territory in 1836, along with two brothers and two sons, and settled in what is now New Berlin. McWhorter was an abolitionist and a member of the temperance movement, becoming one of the founders of Waukesha's first temperance organization in 1839.

When the town of Muskego was first created in 1842 it also comprised the territory that would later be split off as the town of New Berlin, where McWhorter resided. At Muskego's first town election, in April 1842, McWhorter was elected to the town board of supervisors. In 1854, he became a member of the board of trustees of the First Presbyterian Church of Waukesha, and later served as an elder and deacon in the church.

In 1857, McWhorter was elected to the Wisconsin State Assembly, running on the Republican Party ticket. He represented Waukesha County's 4th Assembly district, which then comprised the towns of New Berlin, Brookfield, and Pewaukee.

In the fall of 1858, he was elected coroner of Waukesha County, and held the office for a two-year term.

== Personal life and family ==
George McWhorter was the eldest of seven children born to Matthew McWhorter and his wife Mary Ann (née Turner). Many of George's siblings moved with him to Waukesha County in the 1830s and became part of the history of that county. His sister, Jane, was the second school teacher at the first known school in what is now the city of Waukesha. His nephew, Paul Wheeler McWhorter was a soldier in the 28th Wisconsin Infantry Regiment during the Civil War, and then transferred to serve as a non-commissioned officer in the 54th United States Colored Infantry Regiment, and after the war became a colonel in the Wisconsin National Guard.

George McWhorter married twice. His first wife was Mary Lytle. They married in 1815 and had five children together before her death in 1845. He later married Thetis Smith (née Johnson), the widow of Emery Smith, in 1854. There were no known children of the second marriage. George McWhorter died January 19, 1867.

Two of McWhorter's daughters married men who would serve in the Wisconsin State Assembly. His eldest daughter, Mary, married George M. Humphrey, who represented their Assembly district in the 1st Wisconsin Legislature. His youngest daughter, Nancy, married Eliphalet Stone, who represented Waukesha County in the 1872 term.

McWhorter's youngest son, George H. McWhorter Jr., would serve 30 years as a justice of the peace in Milwaukee County, but committed suicide in 1899 after losing an election to remain in that office.

Wisconsin State Assembly
| Preceded by Elihu Enos | Member of the Wisconsin State Assembly from the Waukesha 4th district January 4, 1858 – January 3, 1859 | Succeeded by Charles T. Deissner |
Political offices
| Preceded by Ira Rowe | Coroner of Waukesha County, Wisconsin; January 1, 1859 – January 1, 1861 | Succeeded by William M. Saunders |
