= Leonard Hinkley =

19th century American politician

Leonard D. Hinkley

Member of the Wisconsin State Assembly from the Waukesha 1st district
- In office January 2, 1871 – January 1, 1872
- Preceded by: Henry Totten
- Succeeded by: Eliphalet Stone

Personal details
- Born: February 3, 1839 Eagle, Wisconsin, U.S.
- Died: May 9, 1918 (aged 79)
- Resting place: Forest Home Cemetery, Milwaukee
- Party: Democratic

Military service
- Branch/service: United States Volunteers; Union Army
- Years of service: 1862–1865
- Rank: Private, USV
- Unit: 24th Reg. Wis. Vol. Infantry
- Battles/wars: American Civil War

Leonard Daniel Hinkley (February 3, 1839 – May 9, 1918) was an American merchant and Democratic politician. He was a member of the Wisconsin State Assembly, representing Waukesha County during the 1871 session. He is said to be the first member of the Wisconsin Legislature to have been born in Wisconsin. His last name is sometimes spelled Hinckley.

== Biography ==
Leonard Hinkley was born February 3, 1839. He was a child of the first American settlers at what is now the town of Eagle, Wisconsin, and he was only the second or third child born in that town. He was raised and educated there until 1862, when he volunteered for service in the Union Army.

He was enrolled as a private in Company A of the 24th Wisconsin Infantry Regiment, but spent six months as a musician in the regiment band. He rejoined Company A in May 1863 and remained with the company through the end of the war. The 24th Wisconsin Infantry served in the western theater of the war, and participated in many of the battles in Kentucky, Tennessee, and northern Georgia.

After returning from the war, Hinkley was elected town clerk in 1867, treasurer in 1868 and 1869, and chairman of the town board in 1870. In the fall of 1870, he was elected to the Wisconsin State Assembly running on the Democratic Party ticket. He represented Waukesha County's first Assembly district, which then comprised much of the southern half of the county.

After the Assembly, Hinkley was employed in the grain business and lived for at least some time in Janesville, Wisconsin, and was a crop inspector on the Chicago, Milwaukee and St. Paul Railroad. He lived for a number of years in South Dakota.

== Personal life and family ==
Leonard Hinkley was the eldest child of Ahira Rockwell "A. R." Hinkley and his wife Mary (née Daniels). Ahira Hinkley was a native of Grafton County, New Hampshire, and is considered the founder of Eagle, Wisconsin, having located the site and staked his claim there in 1836, along with his brother Henry. The Hinkleys trace their lineage back to the brothers John and Thomas Hinckley, who came to the Plymouth Colony sometime before 1637. Leonard's father, Ahira, was the first in their line to drop the "c" from the family name.

== Electoral history ==
=== Wisconsin Assembly (1870) ===
Wisconsin Assembly, Waukesha 1st District Election, 1870
Party	Candidate	Votes	%	±%
General Election, November 8, 1870
Democratic	Leonard D. Hinkley	887	51.93%	
Republican	Vernon Tichenor	821	48.07%	
Plurality		66	3.86%	
Total votes		1,708	100.0%	
Democratic hold				

Wisconsin State Assembly
Preceded by Henry Totten	Member of the Wisconsin State Assembly from the Waukesha 1st district January 2, 1871 – January 1, 1872	Succeeded by Eliphalet Stone
