= Limona, Florida =

Former unincorporated community in Hillsborough County, Florida, USA

Coordinates: 27°56′44″N 82°18′14″W

Limona was an unincorporated community in Hillsborough County, Florida. It existed by that name from about 1876 to about the 1963, when it became part of the unincorporated town of Brandon, Florida.

Limona Improvement, exists as a neighborhood within the unincorporated community of Brandon.
