= Lee Roy Selmon Expressway =

Highway in Florida

State Road 618
- Lee Roy Selmon Expressway
- SR 618 highlighted in red

Route information
- Maintained by Tampa-Hillsborough Expressway Authority
- Length: 16.032 mi (25.801 km)
- Existed: 1976–present

Major junctions
- West end: US 92 in Tampa
- SR 60 / US 41 Bus. in Downtown Tampa; US 41 Bus. in Ybor City; I-4 in Ybor City; US 41 near Ybor City; US 301 near Brandon
- East end: I-75 near Brandon

Location
- Country: United States
- State: Florida
- Counties: Hillsborough

Highway system
- Florida State Highway System; Interstate; US; State; Former; Pre‑1945; Toll; Scenic
← SR 616	→ SR 620

State Road 618 (SR 618), also known as the Lee Roy Selmon Expressway, and formerly known as the Crosstown Expressway, is a 14.168-mile (22.801 km) controlled-access toll road in Hillsborough County, Florida. It connects the South Tampa neighborhood near MacDill Air Force Base with Downtown Tampa and the bedroom community of Brandon. The expressway was built in stages, opening between 1976 and 1987. An approximately 1.9-mile extension to the thoroughfare's western terminus opened to traffic on Monday, April 19, 2021.

The expressway was supposed to be part of a multi-expressway system that failed in the 1970s due to heavy local opposition and financial burdens. The original designation for the expressway was State Road 449, but it was switched to State Road 618, which remained a hidden designation until the early 2000s when it began appearing on maps and in atlases.

The expressway features an elevated bridge, the world's first reversible, all-electronic, elevated express lane project, opened in 2006, called the Reversible Express Lanes and with the hidden designation of State Road 618A. The entire expressway ended cash collection on September 17, 2010, going to the state's All-Electronic Tolling system for both the REL and the main expressway.

The expressway, originally known as the Southern Crosstown Expressway, was renamed Lee Roy Selmon Expressway in 1999 in honor of former Tampa Bay Buccaneers hall-of-fame football player Lee Roy Selmon. The "Crosstown" portion of the name was dropped in 2008. By 2020, the Crosstown signs were removed, and navigation systems were updated to "Selmon Expressway" or "SR 618".

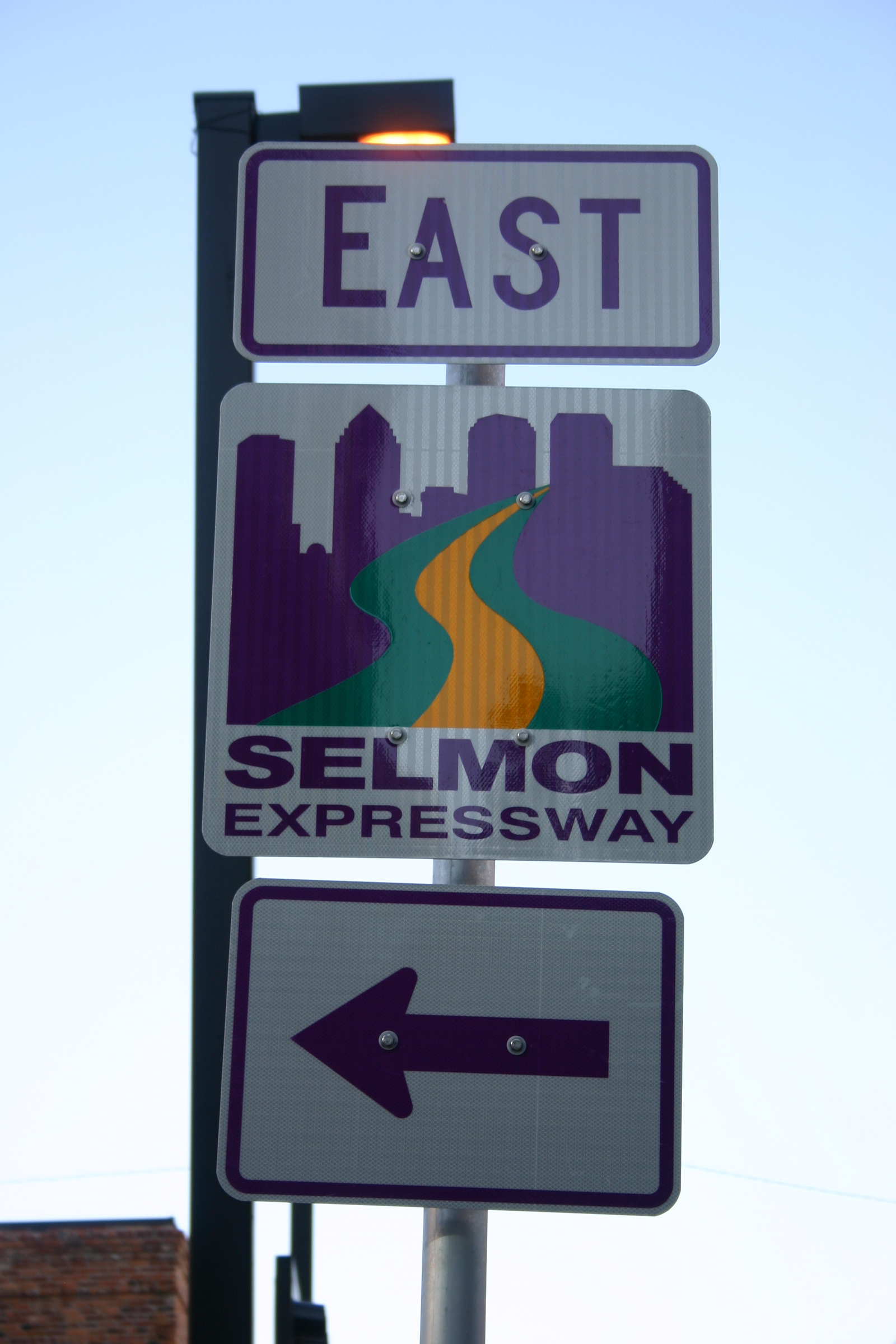
Selmon Expressway logo used from 2010-Present.

== Route description ==
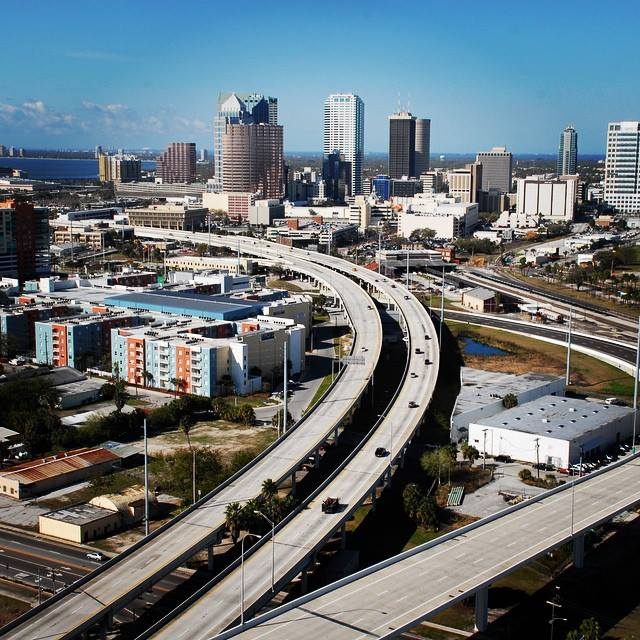
The Selmon Expressway entering downtown Tampa (looking west), with the elevated, reversible lanes in the bottom-right, curving out of the image, then re-entering the image in the right-center and travelling beneath the mainline to Meridian Avenue.

The expressway begins at the western edge of U.S. Route 92 (Gandy Boulevard) in Hillsborough County. The Selmon Extension, which opened in 2021, serves as a "queue" jump for lights on Gandy Boulevard. It makes its way northeast next to a lightly used CSX rail corridor for the first four miles before heading east towards downtown Tampa. From Florida Ave, the highway winds through the Channelside District and the southern fringe of Ybor City before continuing due eastward towards 78th St. There is a connection to I-4 just east of 22nd St that allows commuters to easily move between various points throughout Hillsborough County and beyond. Just west of 78th St, the expressway crosses over Palm River (the southernmost portion of the Tampa Bypass Canal) and makes a southeastward curve towards US 301. From there, the highway crosses over US 301 and Falkenburg Road before ending at a trumpet interchange with I-75 in Brandon.

=== Express lanes ===
The Reversible Express Lanes (REL), also known as State Road 618A, begins at Meridian Avenue in downtown Tampa, following the main expressway's path in the center median for most of its journey. Almost the entire route is elevated, with the exception of at-grade segments between 26th Street and 39th Street, as well as between 78th Street and I-75. An at-grade provision was made between 26th Street and 39th Street to accommodate the Interstate 4/Selmon Expressway Connector. This at-grade portion is equipped with an eastbound (only) slip-ramp to allow commuters from South Tampa to utilize the REL. A toll gantry is located just east of 78th Street and is the only toll gantry along the entire REL. Between 78th Street and US 301, slip-ramps exist for both directions (exiting and entering the REL). The REL crosses over I-75 and ends at Town Center Boulevard in Brandon (near Westfield Brandon). From there, the highway disperses onto the Brandon Parkway, which connects to Providence Road and other redesigned thoroughfares to allow seamless connection to points within Brandon and surrounding areas.

==== Operating hours ====
On weekdays, the REL operates the express lanes westbound from 5:00 am-12:00 pm. Then, from 12:00 pm through 5:00 am the next morning, the REL operates the express lanes eastbound only.

On weekends and holidays, the REL stays operating in the eastbound direction from 12:00 pm Friday afternoon through 5:00 am Monday morning.

=== Gandy Blvd Extension ===
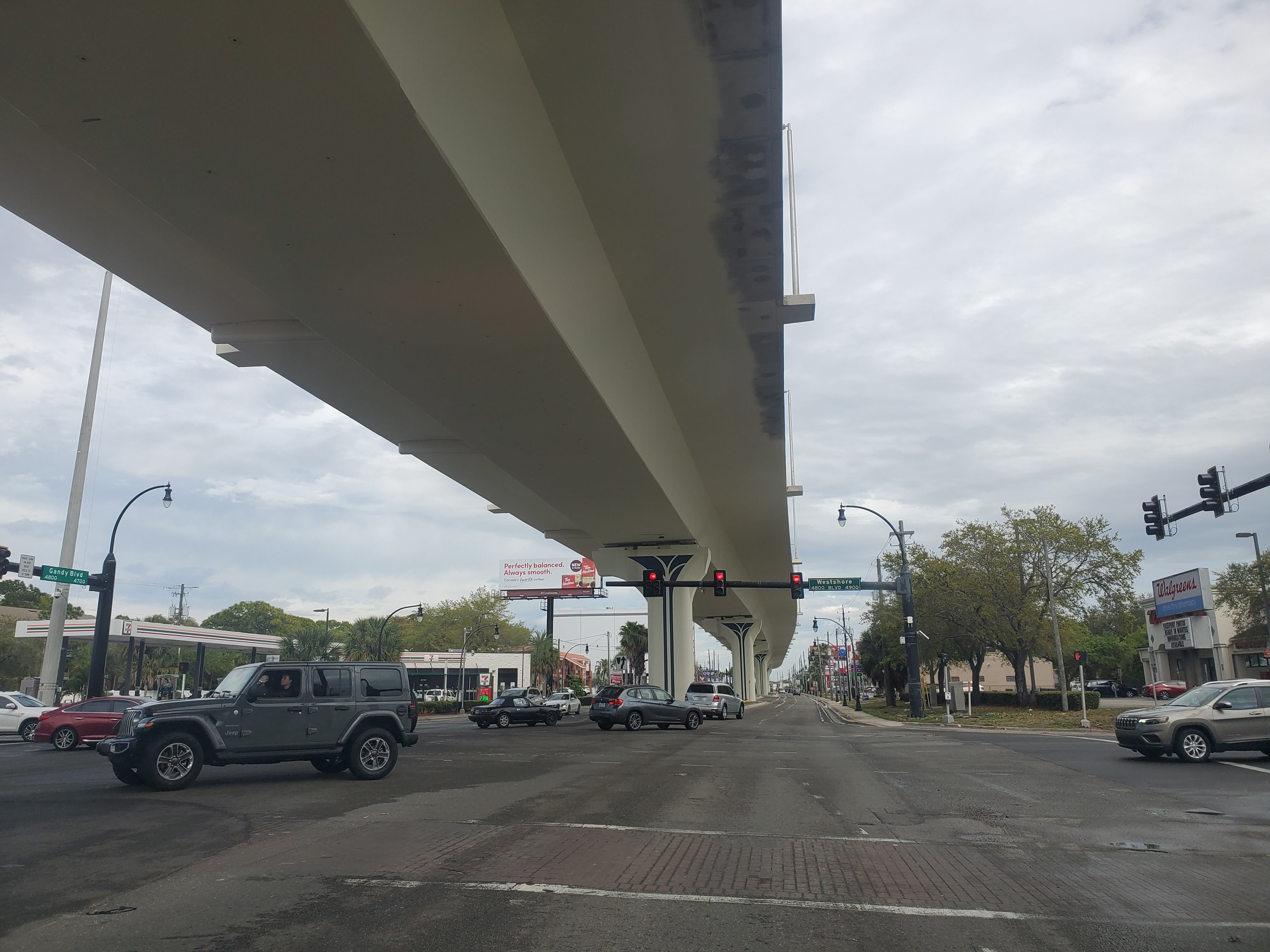
The Selmon Extension as it towers over the intersection of Gandy Blvd and WestShore Blvd.

Officially known as just the Selmon West Extension, the project is a two-lane elevated viaduct over the median of Gandy Blvd in order to provide commuters a signal-free drive from the Brandon terminus all the way to the Gandy Bridge. Plans for the project originally surfaced in the late 1990s as either a viaduct over the roadway's median or as a separate limited access roadway paralleling Gandy either to the north or south. Community opposition brought the project to a standstill multiple times and eventually caused the north and south limited access highway options to be cancelled outright.

The remaining option for the elevated viaduct over the median of Gandy survived but was further halted due to additional community opposition, as well as budgetary issues brought upon by the 2009 recession. In 2016, the THEA began public outreach efforts to restart the project and execute construction in a manner which would not cause a detrimental impact on the surrounding community. The agency also launched its Shop Gandy initiative to help businesses along the Gandy corridor before, during, and after the course of construction. The project was completed in March 2021, and the extension opened to traffic on April 19, 2021, in the early afternoon.

By using the extension, commuters are able to travel between the Brandon terminus and Pinellas County without encountering a stoplight.

=== Lane counts ===
For most of its length, the Selmon is four lanes (two in each direction). However, some six-lane segments (three lanes in each direction) exist.

- Two lanes (one in each direction) along the Gandy Blvd Extension.
- Four lanes (two in each direction) from Gandy Boulevard to just east of Morgan Street.
- Six lanes (three in each direction) from just east of Morgan Street to the I-4/Selmon Connector.
- Four lanes through the I-4/Selmon Connector interchange.
- Six lanes from the I-4/Selmon Connector to 50th Street.
- Four lanes from 50th St to just east of 78th Street.
- Six lanes from just east of 78th St to just west of US 301.
- Four lanes through the US 301 interchange.
- Six lanes from just east of US 301 to Falkenburg Road.
- Four lanes from Falkenburg Road to I-75
- The elevated lanes consist of three lanes from Meridian Avenue to just east of 78th Street, narrowing down to two lanes as it travels to the Brandon Parkway.

=== Open-road tolling or All-Electronic Tolling ===
The expressway has no toll gates. To accommodate motorists who do not have transponders, the Tampa-Hillsborough Expressway Authority and Florida's Turnpike Enterprise utilize its All-Electronic Tolling program. Vehicles without transponders are photographed and their license plates are read. Notification of the toll is mailed to the vehicle's owner with an added administrative fee. Fines are imposed if tolls are not paid within 60 days. If tolls are not paid within 120 days, a hold can be placed on the registration of the vehicle. Someone who tries to re-register their vehicle with a hold on it is expected to satisfy the outstanding toll balance before re-registering their vehicle. As the industry moves interoperability, AET accepts different transponders from different states.

== History ==
=== The South Crosstown Expressway ===
The Crosstown Expressway is the southern component of what was planned to be a system of expressways throughout the Tampa area from the 1950s to 1970s, but the rest were cancelled by the 1980s due to financial problems, land acquisition and community revolts. The first six miles of the tollway were built in the mid-1970s next to a CSX rail line, from the western terminus at Gandy Blvd at Dale Mabry Highway, making an eastward turn at Platt Street/Willow Avenue, snaking around historic Hyde Park before ending at a 3/4-mile, six-lane viaduct, spanning the Hillsborough River in downtown Tampa, ending at Florida Avenue. Ridership was low when it opened in 1976, as people were less willing to drive the toll road when free roads were available nearby. The remaining nine miles of the expressway were built and opened in stages between 1979 and 1987, with the expressway extending to Falkenburg Road in 1983 and connecting to its eastern terminus of I-75 in 1987.

In 1975, a contest was held to determine the logo of the expressway. Only one entry was submitted, a picture of pirate Jose Gaspar with the title "TAMPA CROSSTOWN EXPRESSWAY", all on a blue background. This logo was phased out in the early 2000s. In 2006, an "interim" logo featuring a bridge over a highway reading "Selmon-Crosstown Expressway" was unveiled but was never widely implemented along the expressway. In 2008, a more permanent logo was unveiled, which consists of the FDOT standard "TOLL 618" plates and a "Selmon Expressway" logo. This new logo, which replaced the previous Crosstown Expressway logos, reads "SELMON EXPRESSWAY" with downtown Tampa in purple as well as two teal and one yellow ribbon extending from the city.

In 2001, a city truck equipped with a hydraulic lift slammed into the 34th Street overpass when the vehicle's lift was unknowingly raised. The accident crippled a support beam, which had to be replaced. In 2005, a similar vehicle destroyed the overhead exit sign at Euclid Ave (Exit 2) and over a month passed before a replacement sign (and structure) were installed. Also, a few accidents have made headlines over the years, including wrong way, speeding and impaired drivers.

In 2004, the Tampa Hillsborough Expressway Authority accelerated a planned toll hike that would increase the mainline toll plazas by 25 cents and raise the 22nd St exit tolls to 75 cents from its original date in 2009 to 2007. The toll hike took effect on January 1, 2007, with the hike for the 22nd St ramps going into effect in late June 2006.

On September 17, 2010, cash collection on the Selmon Expressway ended in favor of all-electronic tolling. The original toll plazas were removed and replaced with toll gantries similar to the ones installed on the Reversible Express Lanes, allowing free-flowing movement throughout the tollway. The expressway takes transponders from different states, including Florida's SunPass transponder. Customers who do not have a transponder account will be billed later for their use on the expressway.

In 2013, the Selmon Expressway celebrated its 50th anniversary. Also, in the same year, the I-4 Connector opened. The I-4 Connector is an elevated north-south toll road that connects I-4 with the Selmon Expressway, two major east-west corridors in the Tampa region. The new roadway crosses several urban streets, State Road 60, and CSX railroad tracks, including interchanges with I-4 and the Selmon Expressway. The Connector has exclusive truck lanes that provide direct access to the Port of Tampa and remove commercial traffic from Ybor City's local roads. The toll road uses an All-Electronic Toll (AET) system.

In 2014, the Reversible Express Lanes were designated by USDOT as a testbed for automated vehicles.

In May 2015, the Selmon Greenway opened to the public. The Selmon Greenway is a pedestrian-friendly urban trail that runs through downtown Tampa. The Greenway connects several popular neighborhoods of Tampa, including Ybor City, Channelside, and Water Street.

On April 19, 2021, after three years of construction, the Selmon Extension opened to the public. The Selmon Extension is a 1.9-mile toll lane located in the median of Gandy Boulevard, which allows a choice for local residents and regional travelers: use Gandy Boulevard for local destinations or use the Selmon Extension for a direct connection to the Selmon Expressway or Dale Mabry Highway.

=== The Reversible Express Lanes ===
The Reversible Express Lanes (REL), aimed at cutting traffic congestion times, were originally envisioned in 1995 by the Tampa Hillsborough Expressway Authority (THEA) as an innovative idea to increase capacity along the Lee Roy Selmon Expressway from Downtown Tampa to Brandon without acquiring additional right-of-way. Instead, an elevated, three-lane bridge was built over the existing median of the expressway. Planning for the project began around 1995/1996, but final designs/planning were not made until the later 1990s.

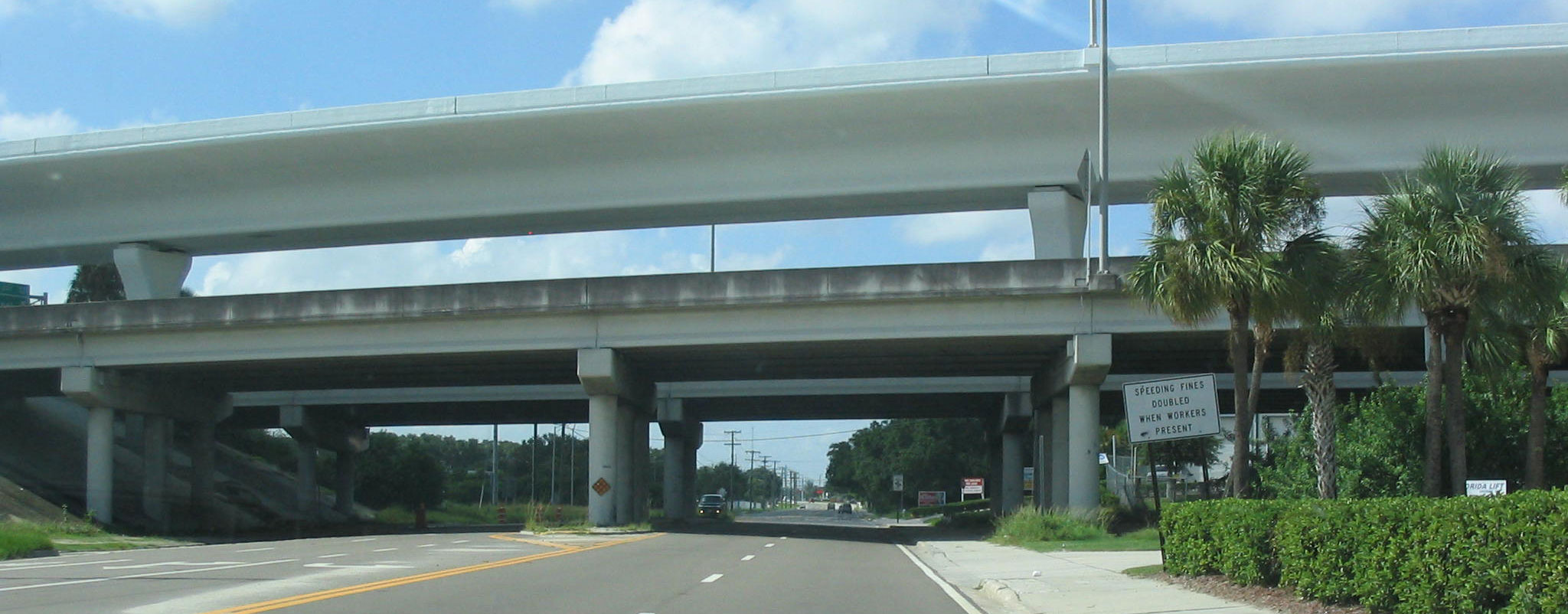
The Lee Roy Selmon Expressway and the Reversible Express Lanes at 78th Street

Construction commenced in 2003 but in 2004, a portion of the elevated bridge collapsed during construction, halting construction for about a year. The segment was repaired and all other piers were reinforced when construction resumed in 2005.

In spring 2005, two realigned sections of the eastbound lanes opened. One section is between 22nd Street and 39th Street, the other is between 78th Street and I-75. The at-grade sections of the REL now follow the old alignments. The Brandon Gateway section of the REL opened in November 2005 and gained overwhelmingly positive input from commuters.

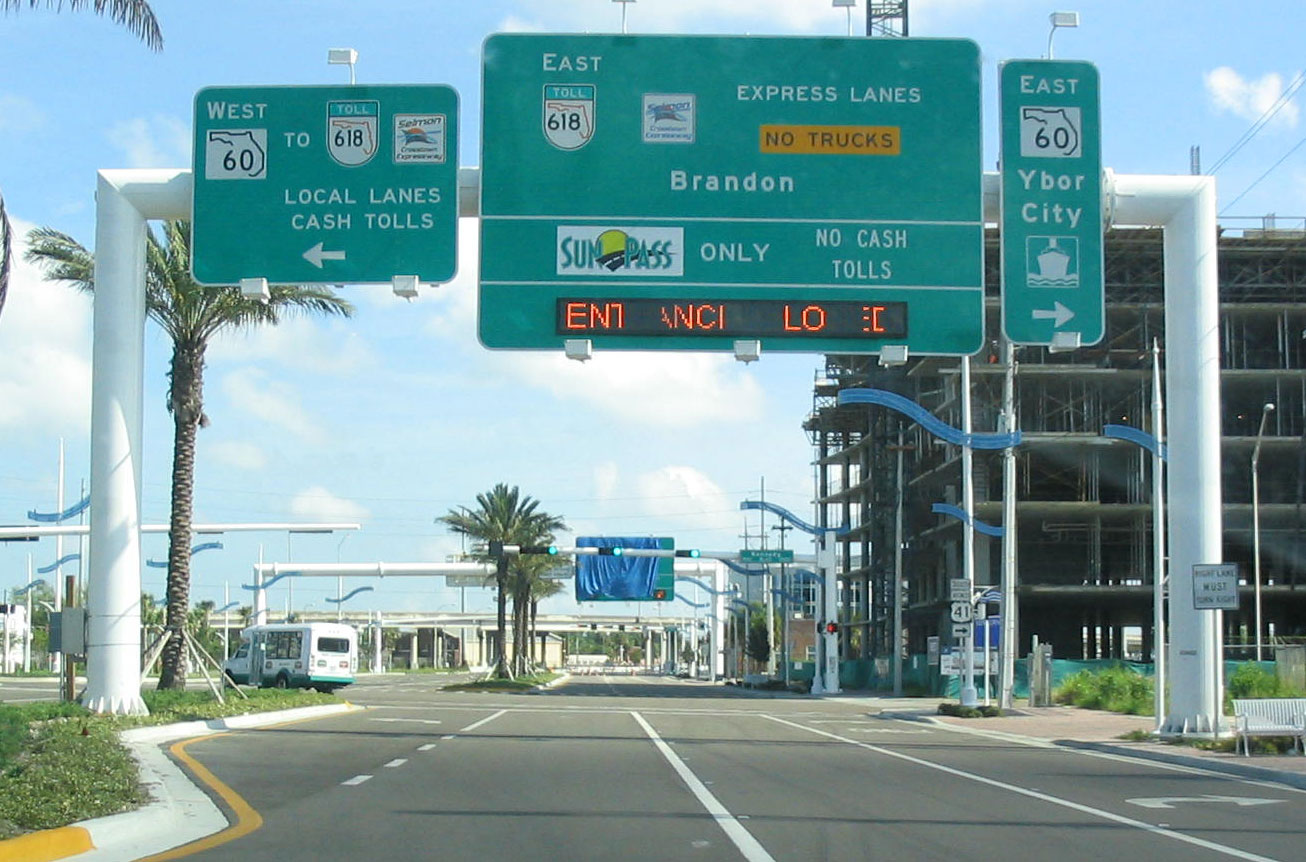
The western end of the reversible lanes bridge empties traffic onto the recently reconstructed Meridian Avenue

On July 18, 2006 at 6 am, the REL opened to westbound morning traffic (only). Long lines were formed at the Brandon Gateway well in advance as many anticipated using the new road. However, the scene from news helicopter snapshots showed that only a handful of drivers actually ended up using the new bridge, compared to the number that was expected. These findings may be blamed partly on the lack of advance notification to commuters, the number of commuters who owned a SunPass transponder, and an unrelated traffic incident on Ashley Drive in downtown Tampa. The eastbound direction opened to traffic on August 29, 2006 at 3:30 pm. A "Grand Opening" celebration was held on September 23, 2006, with festivities including a 5k and 10k run across the REL. The project was officially completed in 2007 after four years of construction at the cost of $420 million.

On November 1, 2006, THEA in partnership with Florida's Turnpike Enterprise, began a pilot program, known as "Toll-by-Plate." This program allows occasional commuters to utilize the REL without having a transponder. A system of high-resolution cameras (at the 78th Street gantry) take photos of license plates. The commuter is then sent a bill via mail. The program's success led to the eventual expansion of All-Electronic Tolling to the rest of the Selmon Expressway.

Level of service was upgraded from an "F" to an "A" as commuters are now able to travel at full speed, cutting travel time by as much as 60 minutes per day. The REL project won the prestigious "2007 IBTTA President's Award: Most Innovative Toll Transportation Project in the World," along with 22 awards for engineering excellence and community-friendly design. This modern solution is a prototype for managing urban traffic congestion and reducing green house gases.

In June 2009, a settlement was reached between THEA, URS, and other parties, regarding the 2004 collapse of the REL and the lawsuit that followed. THEA was able to obtain approximately $75 million from the settlement, which will be used to pay off debts and help fund a widening and rehabilitation project along the downtown Tampa viaduct.

=== The Interstate 4/State Road 618 Connector Project ===
This is a connection between the Selmon Expressway and nearby Interstate 4 to the north, designed to help filter hazardous cargo away from Ybor City to the Port of Tampa. The 39th Street interchange (Exit 10) permanently closed on May 13, 2010 to make way for the I-4/Selmon Expressway Connector ramps. The connector opened to traffic on January 6, 2014.

In conjunction with the I-4/Selmon Connector project, the THEA widened the section of the downtown viaduct from just east of Morgan St to 20th St from four lanes (two in each direction) to six lanes (three in each direction). This particular project was budgeted at $70 million, with some of the funds coming from a settlement between the THEA and other parties for the 2004 collapse of the REL.

== Future ==
=== Testing of automated vehicles ===
In 2014, the REL were selected by USDOT as one of ten sites throughout the U.S. that could test out automated vehicles. Such testing would occur during off-peak hours and would require a complete closure of the REL during those times. Then, in 2019, in cooperation with the Society of Automotive Engineers (SAE) International, THEA successfully conducted the first-ever publicly accessible autonomous vehicle demonstration in Tampa, Florida.

=== Possible spur to Riverview ===
In 2023, the THEA launched initial plans to begin examining the possibility of constructing an elevated expressway spur to Riverview via US Hwy 301 to Big Bend Rd. The corridor would be constructed similarly to that of the Gandy extension, but with four lanes (two lanes in each direction). An alternative alignment would call for tolled express lanes along I-75 from the existing terminus interchange to Big Bend Rd. On July 22, 2023, the Hillsborough County Board of County Commissioners provided approval to allow the THEA to move ahead with the planning process, including needed community outreach. The project is expected to cost $1.8 billion, but would not see major construction commence until around 2040.

== Exit list ==
Selmon Extension (Gandy Blvd upper deck)

The entire route is in Tampa, Hillsborough County.

mi	km	Exit	Destinations	Notes
0.000	0.000	-	US 92 (Gandy Boulevard)	A U-turn point is located between the end of the elevated span and the east end of the Gandy Bridge.
1.8	2.9	1A	SR 573 south / US 92 east (S Dale Mabry Highway) – MacDill Air Force Base	Road is unsigned SR 600
1.9	3.1	Gandy Blvd Toll Gantry		
1.000 mi = 1.609 km; 1.000 km = 0.621 mi: Electronic toll collection; Incomplete access

Selmon mainline

The entire route is in Hillsborough County.

Location	mi	km	Exit	Destinations	Notes
Tampa	0.000	0.000	1	US 92 (Gandy Boulevard) – MacDill Air Force Base, St. Petersburg	Signed as exits 1A (east) and 1B (west); road is unsigned SR 600
Tampa	1.146	1.844	2	Euclid Avenue	Westbound exit and eastbound entrance
Tampa	2.020	3.251	3	Bay to Bay Boulevard	Westbound exit and eastbound entrance
Tampa	4.038	6.499	4	Willow Avenue – Davis Islands	To Tampa General Hospital
Tampa	4.7	7.6	West Mainline Toll Gantry		
Tampa	4.646	7.477	5	Plant Avenue – Davis Islands	Westbound exit and eastbound entrance; to Tampa General Hospital
Tampa	5.117	8.235	6	Downtown West, Downtown East	Via local roads; eastbound exit and westbound entrance; signed as exits 6A (west) and 6B (east)
Tampa	5.352	8.613	7	Downtown West	Via Morgan Street; westbound exit and eastbound entrance
Tampa	5.747	9.249	8	SR 60 west (Kennedy Boulevard) – Downtown East	Westbound exit and eastbound entrance; road is unsigned US 41 Business
Tampa	6.878	11.069	9	US 41 Bus. (22nd Street) – Ybor City, Port of Tampa	Road is unsigned SR 45
Tampa	7.5	12.1	10	I-4 east to I-75 north – Orlando	Via Selmon Connector; eastbound signage
Tampa	7.5	12.1	10	I-4 west to I-275 – Tampa International Airport	Via Selmon Connector; westbound signage
Tampa	7.7	12.4	–	Express Lanes – Brandon	Eastbound exit and westbound entrance
Tampa	8.121	13.069	10	SR 569 (39th Street)	Closed in May 2010 to make way for the Selmon Connector
Tampa	9.017	14.511	11	US 41 (50th Street)	Road is unsigned SR 599
Tampa	10.2	16.4	East Mainline Toll Gantry		
Palm River	11.031	17.753	12	CR 573 (78th Street)	Eastbound exit and westbound entrance
Palm River	11.6	18.7	–	Express Lanes – Downtown Tampa	Westbound exit and eastbound entrance
Palm River	12.5	20.1	–	Express Lanes – Brandon	Eastbound exit and westbound entrance
Palm River–Brandon line	12.875	20.720	13	US 301	Road is unsigned SR 43
Brandon	13.677	22.011	14	Falkenburg Road	Eastbound exit and westbound entrance
Brandon	14.132	22.743	15	I-75 – Naples, Ocala	Signed as exits 15A (south) and 15B (north); exit 256 on I-75 (SR 93A)
1.000 mi = 1.609 km; 1.000 km = 0.621 mi: Closed/former; Electronic toll collection; Incomplete access

Reversible Express Lanes

All exits are unnumbered.

Location	mi	km	Destinations	Notes
Tampa	0.611	0.983	Twiggs Street / Meridian Avenue south – Aquarium, Seaport, Benchmark International Arena	At-grade intersection
Tampa	2.6	4.2	Local Lanes - South Tampa, St. Petersburg	Eastbound entrance and westbound exit
	6.1	9.8	REL Toll Gantry	
Palm River	6.3	10.1	To US 301 / I-75 / Falkenburg Road	Via Local Lanes; eastbound exit and westbound entrance
Palm River	7.4	11.9	Local Lanes – Tampa, St. Petersburg	Westbound exit and eastbound entrance
Brandon	9.667	15.558	Town Center Boulevard / Brandon Parkway east – Brandon Town Center, Brandon	At-grade intersection
1.000 mi = 1.609 km; 1.000 km = 0.621 mi: Electronic toll collection; Incomplete access
