= John M. Wells =

19th century American politician

Member of the Wisconsin State Assembly from the Waukesha 4th district
- In office January 1, 1849 – January 7, 1850
- Preceded by: George M. Humphrey
- Succeeded by: John E. Gallagher

Personal details
- Party: Democratic (after 1849); Free Soil

John Moon Wells was an American farmer, teacher, and pioneer of Waukesha, Wisconsin. He served a single term in the Wisconsin State Assembly, representing Waukesha and New Berlin in the 1849 session. He was elected on the Free Soil Party ticket.

== Background ==
Wells arrived in Waukesha County in 1837, and served as the first public school teacher in the village's tamarack log schoolhouse, during the winter of 1837–1838, with a student body of between 25 and 30 children.

He was a member of the local Congregational Church (built in 1839), and participated in an ecumenical evangelical group known locally as "The Prairieville Breaking Team" which went around to the neighboring schoolhouses and villages to hold prayer meetings, and whose enthusiasm was deemed almost Methodist in its pious fervor.

== Politics ==
In 1841, he had served as the secretary of the Prairieville Democrats when they held a meeting on July 6 in preparation for the upcoming September territorial general election.

On September 26, 1848, he served as a delegate from Waukesha County to the Wisconsin's 1st congressional district convention of the newly organized Free Soil Party, which nominated Charles Durkee for Congress. He also served in other Free Soil leadership positions during that period.

He was elected to the Assembly in 1848 as a Free Soiler, succeeding Democrat George M. Humphrey. During his time in the Assembly, he sponsored Wisconsin's first law criminalizing abortion.

He would be succeeded by Democrat John E. Gallagher.

== Agricultural Society ==
In March 1849, when the Wisconsin State Agricultural Society was organized, Wells was elected as a member of the executive committee. He was also a member of the committee which drafted a constitution for that body.
