= Francis G. Parks =

American politician

Francis G. Parks (June 1, 1824 – February 18, 1902) was an American educator, newspaper editor, businessman, and politician.

Born in Goshen, Addison County, Vermont, Parks went to Brandon Academy in Brandon, Vermont. He then went to a Latin school in Leicester, Vermont. Parks taught school in Rutland and Addison Counties, Vermont In 1845, he moved to St. Johnsbury, Vermont and worked at E & T Fairbanks & Company, which manufactured platform scales. In 1854, Parks served in the Vermont House of Representatives. During his term in the Vermont General Assembly, he helped moved the county seat of Caledonia County, Vermont from Danville, Vermont to St. Johnsbury, Vermont. In 1855, Parks moved to Wisconsin and eventually settled in Eagle, Waukesha County, Wisconsin. From 1888 to 1891, Parks of the editor of a weekly newspaper. He was also in the real estate and insurance business. Parks served as postmaster of Eagle, Wisconsin. He also served as chairman of the Eagle Town Board and on the school board. In 1873, Parks served in the Wisconsin State Assembly and was a Republican. Parks died at his home in Eagle, Wisconsin.
