= Port Tampa Bay =

Sea port in Florida

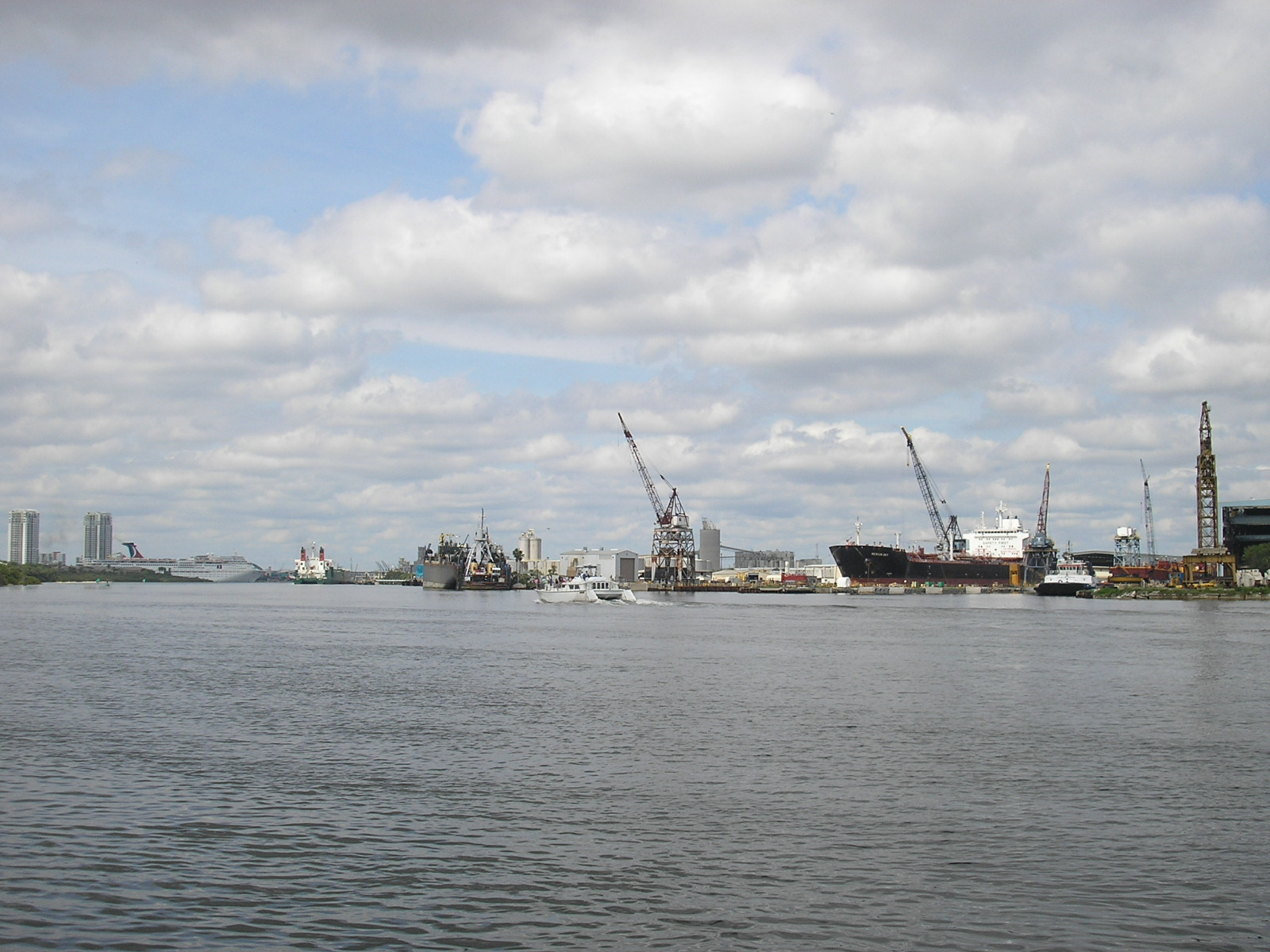
- View of a portion of Port Tampa Bay from Davis Islands, Downtown Tampa background left
- Interactive map of Port Tampa Bay
- Location within the United States

Location
- Country: United States
- Location: Tampa
- Coordinates: 27.949851°N 82.445255°W
- UN/LOCODE: USTPA

Details
- Opened: 1924
- Operated by: Tampa Port Authority
- Type of Harbor: Natural/Artificial
- Size: appx. 5,000 acres (2,000 ha)
- No. of berths: 66
- Draft depth: 45.6 ft.
- Employees: 135
- President & CEO: Paul Anderson (since 2012)
- Channel depth: 43 feet

Statistics
- Vessel arrivals: 3,093 (FY2015)
- Annual cargo tonnage: 37,374,290 (FY2015)
- Annual container volume: 56,742 TEUs or 487,410 net tons (FY2015)
- Passenger traffic: Cruise passenger traffic: 867,114 (FY2015)
- Main exports: Phosphate, fertilizer
- Main imports: Petroleum products, steel
- Water-borne cargo value: $4.51 billion (2014)
- Website www.tampaport.com

Port Tampa Bay, known as the Port of Tampa until January 2014, is the largest port in the state of Florida and is overseen by the Tampa Port Authority, a Hillsborough County agency. The port is located in Tampa, Florida near downtown Tampa's Channel District. The port directly accesses Tampa Bay on the western coast of the Florida Suncoast, and is approximately 25 sea miles from the Gulf of Mexico. The port district includes parts of Tampa Bay, Hillsborough Bay, McKay Bay, Old Tampa Bay and the Hillsborough River. The port serves container ships, tank ships, and cruise lines.

As of 2023, Port Tampa Bay ranks 24th in the United States by total trade in cargo tonnage. It is the largest, most diversified port in Florida, has an economic impact of more than $15.1 billion, and supports over 80,000 jobs. Cargo shipping includes bulk and tanker ships, as well as roll-on/roll-off ships and container cargo ships. The port additionally operates ship repair facilities. Currently connected to major Asian container ports, with global connections, the port is focused on growing its container trade. Millions of dollars in infrastructure improvements are underway or in the planning phase.

== Cargo shipping ==
Weekly containerized cargo service is available at Port Tampa Bay. Ports America operates two container berths, six gantry cranes, a 100-ton Mobile Harbor Crane and a container terminal. In 2014, the Port spent $21.5 million on two new gantry cranes purchased from Zhenhua, which will be operational in 2016. The shipping companies Zim Integrated Shipping Services, Mediterranean Shipping Company, and COSCO are among those who do business at the port. In mid-2025 Ports America in conjunction with Port Tampa Bay purchased 2 more gantry shipping cranes to be commissioned in late 2026, bringing the total number to 6.

The port is also home to Foreign Trade Zone #79. Foreign Trade Zone No. 79 assists companies in Tampa Bay and along the I-4 Corridor in importing, exporting, manufacturing, and distribution activities.

== Bulk Material Shipping ==
The port acts as a central hub for bulk material transit, operations of Titan Cement, Cemex, Quikrete and Sesco bring in over 2 million tons of raw cement yearly. These operations are split both between Port Tampa Bay and Port Redwing.

== Cruise ships ==
Tampa is also one of the most popular departure ports for western Caribbean cruises in the United States. Five cruise lines homeport at Port Tampa Bay: Carnival Cruise Lines, Royal Caribbean International, Holland America Line, Margaritaville at Sea, and Norwegian Cruise Line. AIDA Cruises uses the Port as a port of call. It has three cruise terminals. Fiscal year 2014 saw 888,343 passengers come through the port, encompassing 198 cruise ship calls. Nearby attractions include Channelside, The Florida Aquarium, and Ybor City.

In April 2016, a reversal in Carnival's policy banning Cuban-born Americans from booking cruises to Cuba sparked protests in Miami and at the Port Tampa Bay, where a handful of Cuban-American protesters objected to the Port's ties with Carnival because the company is doing business with the Castro regime. Carnival had initially imposed the ban because Cuban law prohibits Cuban-born people from returning there by sea, even though they can do so on commercial flights, but on April 18 released a statement saying, "All travelers can book its cruises to Cuba, including Cuban-born individuals, in anticipation of Cuba allowing travel on a similar basis as they would if they were traveling by air."

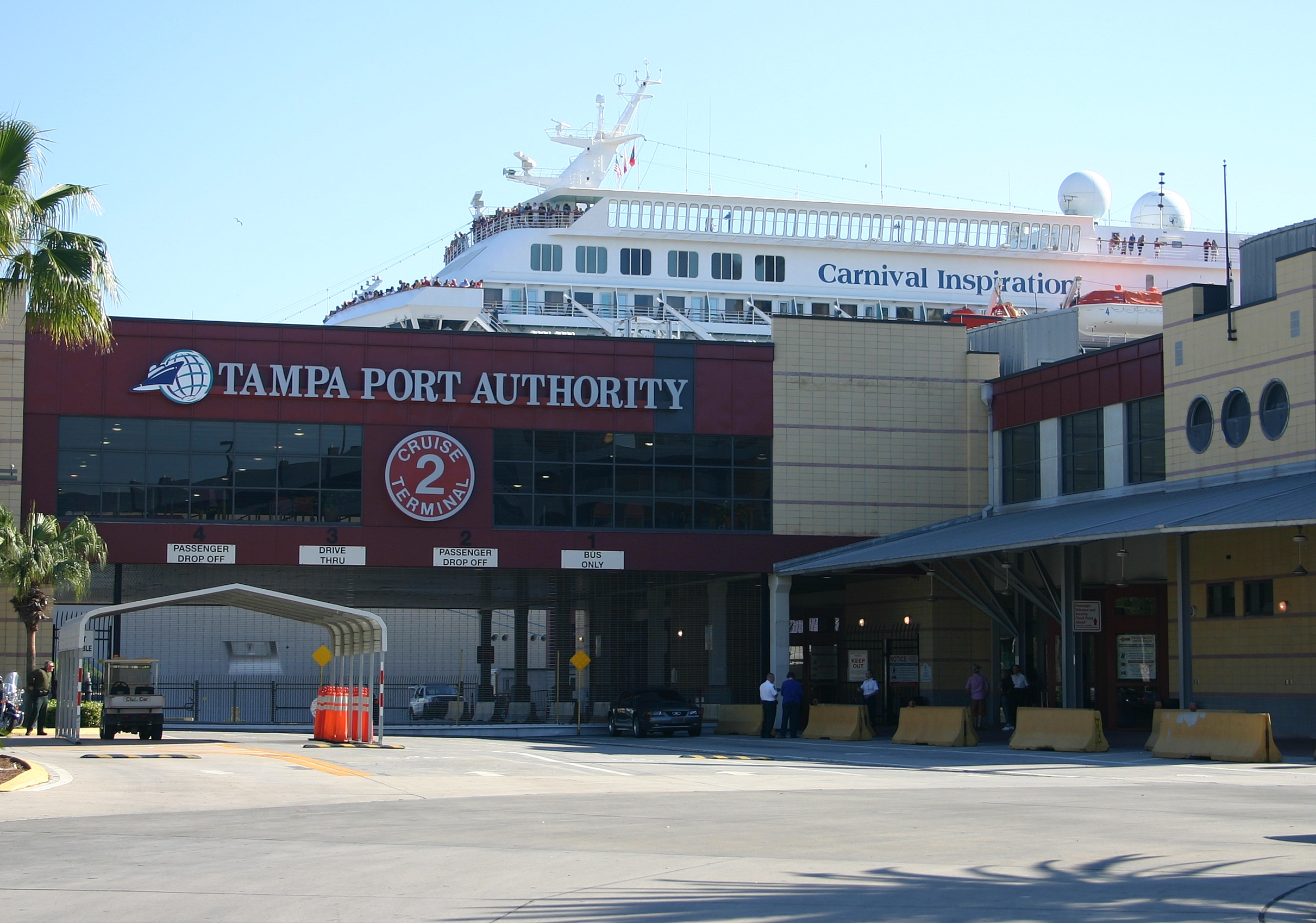
Entrance to pier no. 2 of the Tampa Port Authority (Carnival Inspiration in the background)

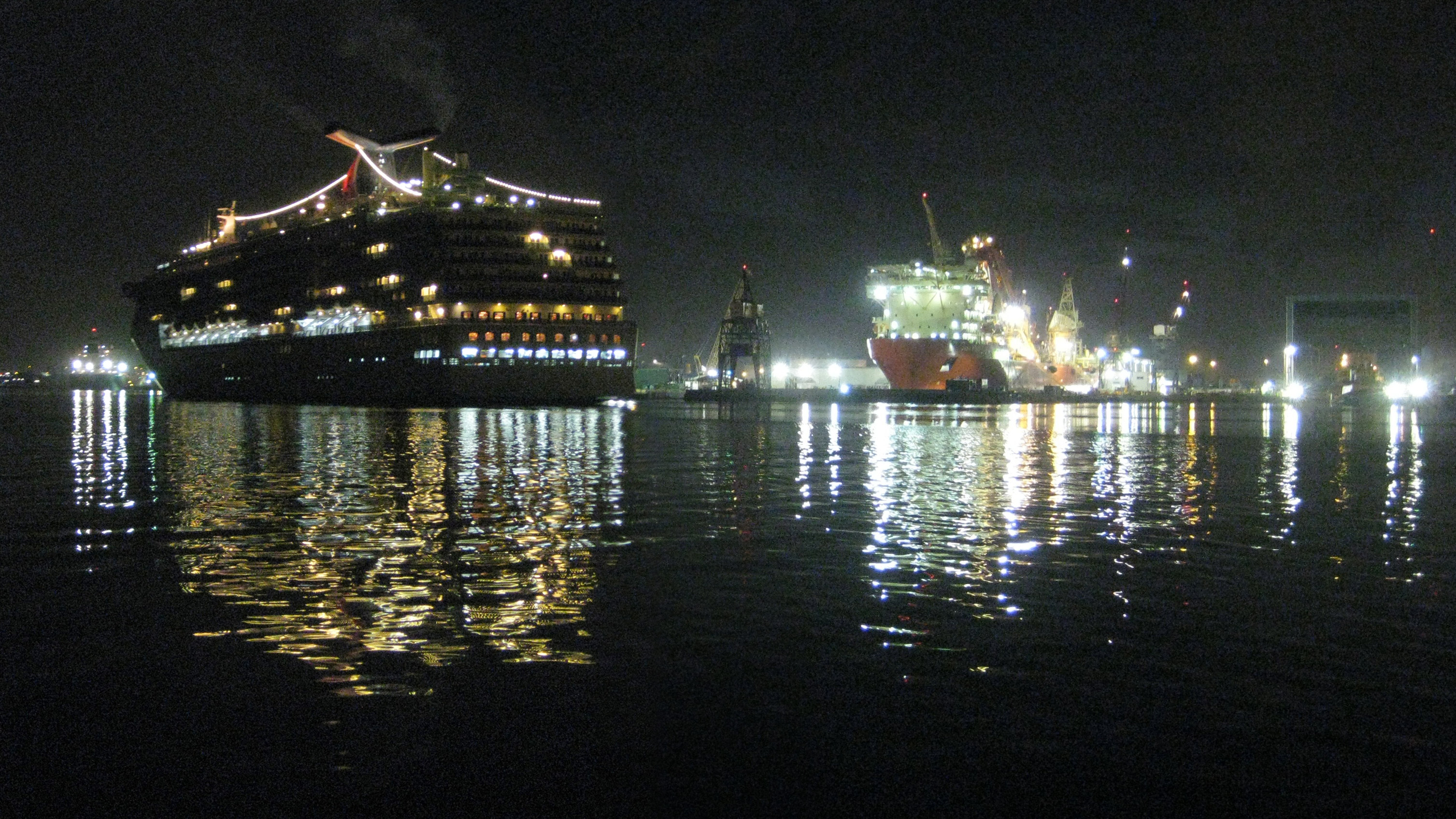
Carnival Legend cruise ship returning to Port Tampa Bay

== Access ==
The cruise terminal and port headquarters are located along Channelside Drive. The nearest major highway to the port is the Lee Roy Selmon Expressway, which runs along the northern edge of the port. Elevated, reversible lanes on the expressway run from Meridian Avenue (three blocks west of the cruise terminal) to Interstate 75 and the suburb of Brandon.

A significant amount of truck traffic to and from the port once traveled on the urban streets of Ybor City, one of just two National Historic Districts in Florida. The Interstate 4 – Selmon Expressway Connector, completed in 2013, is a 1.1-mile (1.8 km) highway which has exclusive truck lanes to route truck traffic from Interstate 4 directly to Port Tampa Bay, which now allows trucks to bypass city roads and travel directly between the Port and the interstate system.

== Leadership ==
Port Tampa Bay is governed by a board of seven commissioners, five of whom are appointed by Florida's governor, the other two being the current Mayor of Tampa and a member of the Hillsborough County Commission.

Current Members:

- Chairman Chad W. Harrod
- Vice Chairman Hung T. Mai
- Secretary/Treasurer Patrick H. Allman
- Commissioner Ted Conner
- Commissioner Michael Owen
- Tampa Mayor Jane Castor

Port Tampa Bay's Leadership team can be found here: Port Tampa Bay Leadership

In November 2023, Port commissioners approved a pay raise for CEO Paul Anderson that brings his salary to $597,000 per year.

== History ==
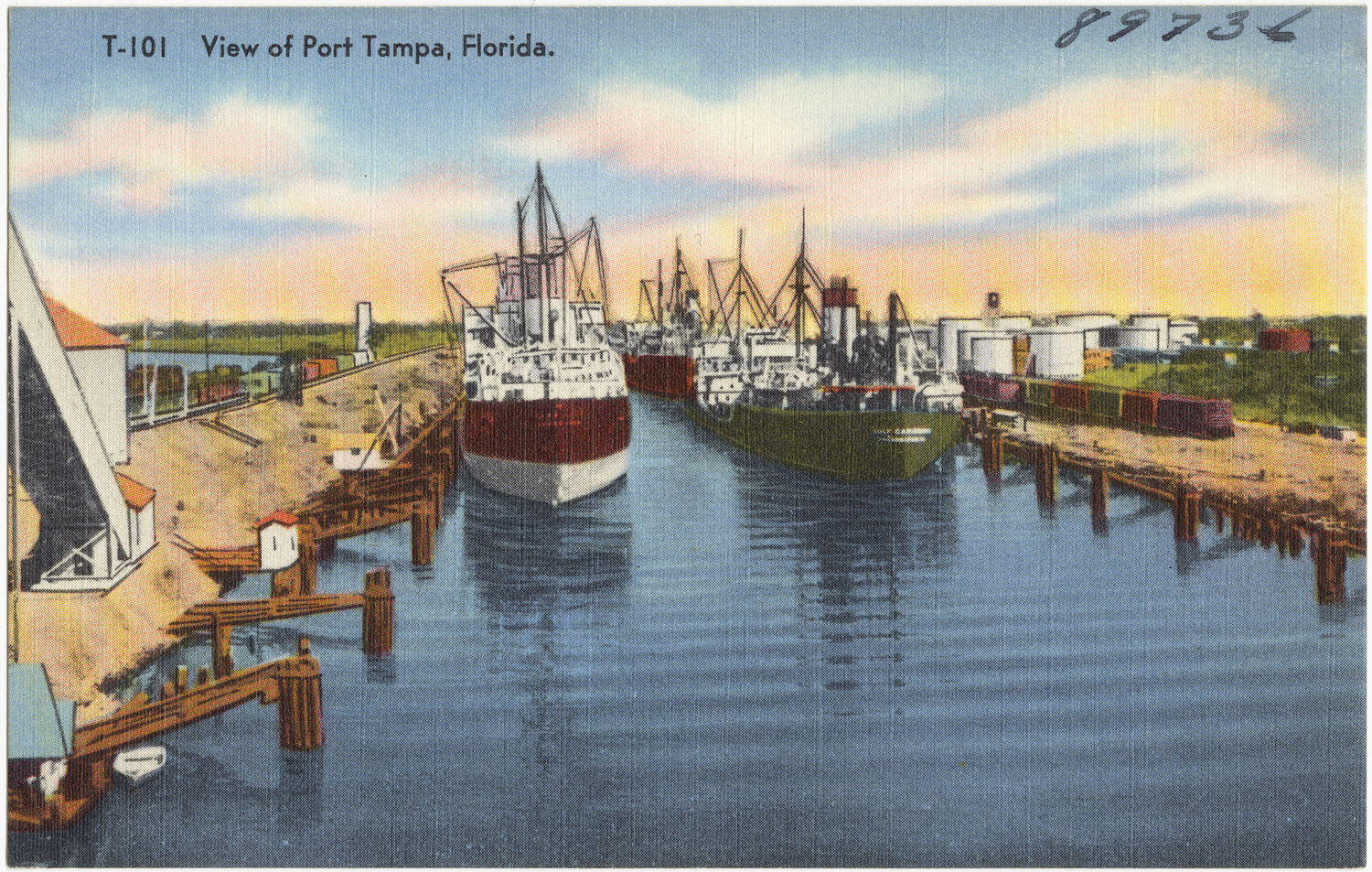
View of Port Tampa c1930

Álvar Núñez Cabeza de Vaca was a leader of the Narváez expedition to establish Spanish colonies in La Florida. Their ships anchored in Tampa Bay on April 12, 1528. Cabeza de Vaca saw the great naval and maritime commerce potential of the bay and described it as “The Port of which we speak is the best in the world.” They continued to explore the upper Gulf Coast.

In 1819 the Adams–Onís Treaty ceded Florida from the Spanish Empire to the United States. In 1821, James Forbes was the U.S. marshal of Florida and he wrote that the bay must “afford protection to our own trade and be of vital importance to our naval grandeur.” Fort Brooke was established at the mouth of the Hillsborough River in 1824. During the Seminole Wars (1816–58), there were primitive wharves where steamships and sailing vessels docked to deliver military supplies, slaves and export hides and lumber.

James McKay Sr. and his wife moved to Tampa in 1846. McKay Sr. is credited for making Tampa a port, because he started with a sailing ship between Tampa, Mobile and New Orleans and then transported cattle to Cuba with two steamships. After the American Civil War (1861–1865), Tampa's cattle trade was taken over by Dr. Howell Tyson Lykes who founded the Lykes Brothers Steamship Company. The railroad tycoon Henry B. Plant built a rail connection from Old Port Tampa (now Port Tampa) to Jacksonville in 1884. By 1888, the rail tracks connected with New York. One of his steamers called the Mascotte was put on the city seal of Tampa when it became an incorporated city in 1887. The Mascotte was active in the Tampa-Key West-Havana trade.

In the late 1880s, Tampa's first cigar factories opened after phosphate was discovered in Central Florida. Tampa became the principal port for shipping cigars. Port Tampa gained national prominence as a key port for steamers during the U.S. intervention in the Cuban War of Independence (1895–1898) and the Spanish-American War (1898).

The Tampa Port Commission was formed with members appointed by the governor of Florida. Local, state, federal and private enterprise collaborated to enable the founding of Port Tampa Bay. Local voters approved a bond issue for funds to build municipal docks and onshore structures which were completed in 1924.

A 27-foot (8.2 m) deep channel for ships was completed in 1929. Tampa's public works department replaced the port commission. The shipyards gained activity during World War II. In 1945, after the war a local referendum created the Hillsborough County Port Authority which was later renamed to Tampa Port Authority. The 34-foot (10.36 m) deep channel was completed in the 1960s and a 43-foot (13.10 m) deep main ship channel in the 1970s.

== See also ==
- Tampa Ship
- Gulf Marine Repair - Tampa Shipbuilding Company
