= George M. Humphrey (Wisconsin politician) =

American miller, pioneer, and politician

Member of the Wisconsin State Assembly from the Waukesha 4th district
- In office June 5, 1848 – January 1, 1849
- Preceded by: Position established
- Succeeded by: John M. Wells

Personal details
- Born: January 6, 1820 Caledonia, New York, U.S.
- Died: November 11, 1866 (aged 46) Kankakee, Illinois, U.S.
- Party: Democratic
- Spouses: Mary T. McWhorter (m. 1846; died 1856); Susan Maria Lyons (m. 1857–1866)
- Children: with Mary McWhorter; Mary (Warren)^{(b. 1846)}; Oscar Mortimer Humphrey^{(b. 1848)}; William Lane Humphrey^{(b. 1850; died 1856)}; Lelia Ann (Mansfield)^{(b. 1852; died 1878)}; Frances Eliza (Owens)^{(b. 1854; died 1873)}; with Susan Lyons; Clara Eugenia (Madigan)^{(b. 1859)}; Jennie Almira (Hall)^{(b. 1861)}; William Stephen Humphrey^{(b. 1864)}
- Relatives: Elijah Oscar Humphrey (brother); George McWhorter (father-in-law)

George Mortimer Humphrey (January 6, 1820 – November 11, 1866) was an American miller, Democratic politician, and Wisconsin pioneer. He served in the first session of the Wisconsin State Assembly, representing Waukesha County.

== Biography ==
George M. Humphrey was born in Caledonia, New York, in January 1820. At a young age, he moved west to the Wisconsin Territory and settled for a time at Whitewater, where he became a successful miller. He later moved to New Berlin, Waukesha County, sometime before 1846. At the first election in Wisconsin under state government, Humphrey was elected to represent his section of Waukesha County in the Wisconsin State Assembly, running on the Democratic Party ticket.

In the 1850s, Humphrey moved to Hillsdale County, Michigan. After 1857, he moved to Illinois, where he farmed. He died at Kankakee, Illinois, on November 11, 1866.

== Personal life and family ==
George M. Humphrey was the third of six children and eldest son of Elijah Humphrey and his wife Ann (née Dickinson). Elijah Humphrey was a pioneer of Caledonia, New York, and had a prosperous farm there. George's younger brother, Elijah Oscar Humphrey, rose to prominence in Michigan and was elected to several terms in the Michigan Senate. The Humphrey family were descended from Michael Humphrey, who emigrated to the Connecticut Colony from England sometime before 1643.

On January 15, 1846, George M. Humphrey married Mary T. McWhorter while living in New Berlin, Wisconsin. Mary McWhorter was a daughter of George McWhorter, who would also represent Waukesha County in the Wisconsin Assembly. George Humphrey and Mary had five children together before her death in Jonesville, Michigan, in 1856. The next year, on November 1, 1857, he married Susan Maria Lyons, at Kalamazoo, Michigan. With his second wife, he had three more children.

Wisconsin State Assembly
New state government	Member of the Wisconsin State Assembly from the Waukesha 4th district June 5, 1848 – January 1, 1849	Succeeded by John M. Wells
