= Asa W. Farr =

19th century American politician

Asa Farr

Member of the Wisconsin State Assembly from the Walworth 4th district
- In office January 7, 1856 – January 5, 1857
- Preceded by: Levi Lee
- Succeeded by: Elihu Enos

District Attorney of Middlesex County, Massachusetts
- In office 1851–1853
- Preceded by: Charles R. Train
- Succeeded by: Charles R. Train

Personal details
- Born: February 28, 1821 Sharon, Vermont, U.S.
- Died: October 6, 1863 (aged 42) Fort Baxter, Cherokee County, Kansas
- Cause of death: Murdered
- Resting place: Pioneer Cemetery, Lake Geneva, Wisconsin
- Party: Democratic
- Spouse: Elisabeth Hadley (m. 1845)
- Children: Frederick Walton Farr; (b. 1846); Ellen Elisabeth Farr; (b. 1848)
- Profession: lawyer

Military service
- Allegiance: United States
- Branch/service: United States Volunteers; Union Army
- Years of service: 1861–1863
- Rank: 1st Lieutenant, USV
- Unit: 3rd Reg. Wis. Vol. Cavalry
- Battles/wars: American Civil War

Asa Walton Farr (February 28, 1821 – October 6, 1863) was an American lawyer, Democratic politician, and Wisconsin pioneer. He served one term in the Wisconsin State Assembly, representing Walworth County during the 1856 term. Before moving to Wisconsin, he had served as district attorney of Middlesex County, Massachusetts from 1851 to 1853. During the American Civil War, he served as a Union Army quartermaster officer and was murdered by Confederate guerillas in the massacre at Baxter Springs.

== Biography ==
=== New England ===
Asa Farr was born in Sharon, Vermont, in February 1821. He was raised and educated in New England. By 1841 he was residing in Lowell, Massachusetts. He worked as a printer was connected with the publication Vox Populi. He became a lawyer in 1845 and two years later formed the firm of Butler and Farr with Benjamin Butler. In 1851, Farr was appointed district attorney of Middlesex County, Massachusetts by Governor George S. Boutwell. He was removed from office for political reasons by Boutwell's successor, John H. Clifford.

=== Wisconsin ===
Disheartened by his firing, Farr moved to Lake Geneva, Wisconsin, with his wife and children. He was admitted to the Wisconsin bar in 1853 and he formed a legal partnership with Charles Minton Baker.

Farr was elected to the Wisconsin State Assembly in 1855 and served in the 9th Wisconsin Legislature.

=== Civil War ===
At the outbreak of the American Civil War, Farr volunteered for service in the Union Army and was enrolled as an assistant quartermaster in the 3rd Wisconsin Cavalry Regiment. The 3rd Wisconsin Cavalry was involved in anti-guerilla operations in the Trans-Mississippi theater of the war, especially around the Kansas–Missouri border area.

In October 1863, Farr was attached to the escort of General James G. Blunt near Fort Baxter, in Cherokee County, Kansas, when they came under attack from several hundred Confederate guerillas, led by William Quantrill. The Union caravan was overrun and many wounded and captured Union soldiers were murdered, including Farr, in what was referred to as the massacre at Baxter Springs.

== Personal life and family ==
Asa Farr was youngest of seven children born to Jonathan and Rebecca (née Walton) Farr. Through his Walton ancestors, Farr was a descendant of William Walton, a clergyman who emigrated from England to the Massachusetts Bay Colony about 1635.

Asa Farr married Elisabeth Hadley on May 13, 1845, at Lowell, Massachusetts. They had at least two children.

Wisconsin State Assembly
Preceded by Levi Lee	Member of the Wisconsin State Assembly from the Walworth 4th district January 7, 1856 – January 5, 1857	Succeeded by Elihu Enos
