= Silver Lake (Oconomowoc, Wisconsin) =

Lake in the state of Wisconsin, United States

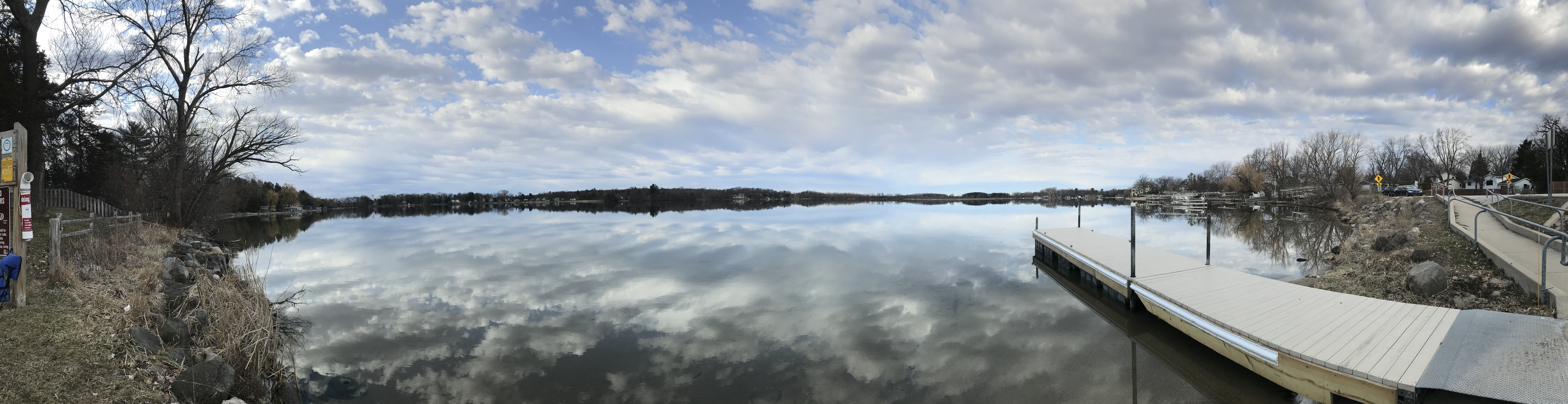

- Location within Wisconsin Location within the United States
- Location: near Oconomowoc, Waukesha County, Wisconsin, US
- Coordinates: 43°04′37″N 088°29′30″W
- Basin countries: United States
- Surface area: 217 acres (88 ha)
- Max. depth: 40 ft (12 m)
- Surface elevation: 863 ft (263 m)

Silver Lake is a lake located just outside Oconomowoc in Waukesha County, Wisconsin, United States.
