= Emmaus Baptist College =

Private Baptist college in Brandon, Florida

Coordinates: 27.93°N 82.278°W

- Motto: Empowering Lives for Christ. Equipping Souls for Ministry.
- Type: Private college
- Established: 1954
- Affiliations: American Baptist Association of Theological Schools, American Baptist Association
- Religious affiliation: Baptist
- President: Danny S. Jones
- Provost: Temple Meek
- Dean: Kerry Beaty
- Location: Brandon, Florida, United States
- Campus: Urban
- Website: https://www.emmausbaptistcollege.org

Emmaus Baptist College is a private Landmark Missionary Baptist college in Brandon, Florida. Its focus is primarily religious with degrees in ministry and education.

== History ==
The college was founded in 1954 as the Florida Baptist Institute and Seminary in Auburndale, Florida. Albert Garner served as President from 1954 to 1970. In 1957 the college moved to Lakeland, Florida, to a facility on West Olive Street overlooking Lake Beulah. The campus was centered around a circular building designed by Jacksonville architect Caleb L. Kelly, Jr.

In 1989 the college moved to Brandon. The name was changed to Emmaus Baptist College after the death of Dr. Garner in 2007.

=== Publications ===
Emmaus Baptist College has two periodical publications containing theological articles, news and ministry reports, and college announcements: The Baptist Anchor, a magazine that has been in print since 1946, and The Emmaus Chronicle, an online news journal.

=== Segregation ===
The college published two books authored by President Garner advocating segregation, The Racial Issue "is God a God of Segregation?" in 1959 and Missionary Baptists and the Civil Rights and Segregation Issue 1954-1964 in 1964. In 1963, Garner discussed racial integration with President John F. Kennedy, expressing his fear that integration would lead to marriage between races, stating that "We have deep moral and religious convictions that integration of the races is wrong and should be resisted." He also expounded before the Judiciary Committee of the US House of Representatives "that Federal efforts to force integration as a new social pattern of life is morally wrong, unChristian, and in conflict with the word and will of God as well as historic Christianity" in 1963.

== Campus ==
The ten-acre campus consists of more than a dozen buildings, including a chapel, two educational buildings, several residences and four dormitories. The college relocated to the Brandon site after selling its Lakeland campus in 1989, and a new educational building was completed there in 1990. In October 2024, Hurricane Milton flooded the dormitories, damaged the roofs of several buildings and displaced students, and classes were suspended for two weeks; the main building, Oakwood Hall, and the library avoided major structural damage.
