= Zuza Beine =

American social media influencer (2011–2025)

- Born: July 1, 2011; Waukesha, Wisconsin, U.S.
- Died: September 22, 2025 (aged 14); Waukesha, Wisconsin, U.S.
- Occupation: Social media personality
- Years active: 2019–2025
- Organization: Glow House
- Known for: Documenting her experience with acute myeloid leukemia

Zuza Beine (July 1, 2011 – September 22, 2025) was an American social media personality and cancer awareness advocate. She was known for documenting her long battle with acute myeloid leukemia (AML) on TikTok and Instagram, where she gained a large following for her openness about treatment and recovery.

== Early life and diagnosis ==
Zuza Beine was born in 2011 in Waukesha, Wisconsin. She was diagnosed with acute myeloid leukemia at age three and began treatment shortly afterward. Her illness relapsed several times during her childhood, leading to extended hospital stays and chemotherapy.

== Social media career ==
Zuza began sharing updates about her health and daily life on Instagram and TikTok during her early teens. Her content included hospital updates, reflections on recovery, and everyday moments. By 2025, Beine had over 1.8 million followers on Instagram and 1.7 million on TikTok. She later joined the content collective Glow House.

== Illness and treatment ==
Beine lived with AML for more than a decade and underwent multiple rounds of chemotherapy and three bone marrow transplants. She frequently discussed the challenges of treatment while emphasizing gratitude and optimism.

== Death and tributes ==
Zuza died on September 22, 2025, in Waukesha, Wisconsin, at age 14. News of her death was confirmed by her family and reported by multiple national outlets. Following her death, singer Noah Kahan paid tribute after her family shared that she had been listening to his music before passing.

== Legacy ==
Zuza’s story received widespread media coverage and has been cited as raising awareness about pediatric cancer and chronic illness among young audiences.
