= John E. Gallagher (politician) =

American politician

John E. Gallagher was a Democratic member of the Wisconsin State Assembly during the 1850 session. Gallagher represented Waukesha County, Wisconsin.
