= Brandon Academy =

Location
- 801 Limona Road; Brandon, Florida; United States; 27.9514°N 82.3041°W

Information
- Type: Private
- Established: 1970
- Owners: Robert and Tricia Rudolph
- Grades: Pre-K - 12th
- Enrollment: 227
- Colors: Navy and white
- Mascot: Scorpion
- Yearbook: Scorpion's Tale
- Affiliation: Nonsectarian
- Website: Brandon Academy

Brandon Academy Private School, or simply "Brandon Academy" or "BA," is a coeducational private day school located on a 10-acre (40,000 m^{2}) campus in Brandon, Florida.

The school was founded in 1970. According to The Tampa Times, Brandon Academy's initial growth was from white parents seeking to avoid enrolling their children in racially integrated public schools. As of February 2018 The school occupies ten buildings, including four school buildings, an office building, an auditorium and Gym, and four portable structures.

== History ==
The school is owned by Robert and Tricia Rudolph, who took over from Teresa "Terry" Curry in 2005.

Starting with the 2015-2016 school year, Brandon Academy began teaching ninth-grade students, adding a grade each successive school year before its first high school graduating class in 2019.

== Academics ==
- In 2010, it was named a National Blue Ribbon School by the United States Department of Education.
- In April 2017, Brandon Academy was named an IB World School.
