= Elihu Enos =

American educator and politician

Elihu Enos Jr.

Member of the Wisconsin State Assembly from the Waukesha 4th district
- In office January 5, 1857 – January 4, 1858
- Preceded by: Asa W. Farr
- Succeeded by: George McWhorter

Personal details
- Born: Elihu Enos Jr. January 24, 1824 Kingsboro, New York, U.S.
- Died: November 13, 1892 (aged 68) Waukesha, Wisconsin, U.S.
- Resting place: Prairie Home Cemetery; Waukesha, Wisconsin
- Party: Republican
- Spouse: Frances Blake
- Parents: Elihu Enos (father); Dotha (Johnson) Enos (mother)

Military service
- Allegiance: United States
- Branch/service: United States Volunteers; Union Army
- Years of service: 1863–1864
- Rank: Captain, USV
- Unit: 28th Reg. Wis. Vol. Infantry
- Battles/wars: American Civil War

Elihu Enos, Jr., (January 24, 1824 – November 13, 1892) was an American educator and politician.

== Biography ==
Born in Kingsboro, New York, Enos graduated from the New York State Normal School at Albany, New York in 1847. Then, in 1847, he moved to Waukesha, Wisconsin Territory and founded the Waukesha Classical and Normal School. He was appointed postmaster of Waukesha in 1849. In 1853, he moved to a farm in the town of Pewaukee, Wisconsin. He served as town superintendent of schools and then Waukesha County, Wisconsin county superintendent of schools. He served in the Wisconsin State Assembly in 1857 and was a member of the Republican Party. During the American Civil War, Enos served in the 28th Wisconsin Volunteer Infantry Regiment; he had to resign from the Union Army and return to Wisconsin because of ill health. In 1872, Enos moved back to Waukesha, Wisconsin and was appointed postmaster of Waukesha for a second time. He died in Waukesha, Wisconsin.
