= Henry Totten =

American businessman and politician (1824 - 1899)

Henry Totten (September 2, 1824 – October 24, 1899) was an American businessman and politician.

Born in Congress Township, Wayne County, Ohio, Totten moved to Barton, Washington County, Wisconsin Territory in 1846. He then settled in Waukesha, Wisconsin and was a merchant. He served as sealer of weights and measurements.

In 1870, Totten served in the Wisconsin State Assembly as a Democrat.

In 1879, Totten moved to Chicago, Illinois and worked for a wholesale business. He later settled in Winnetka, Illinois, where he died in 1899 after suffering from a long illness.
