= Brandon, Florida =

- Census-designated place
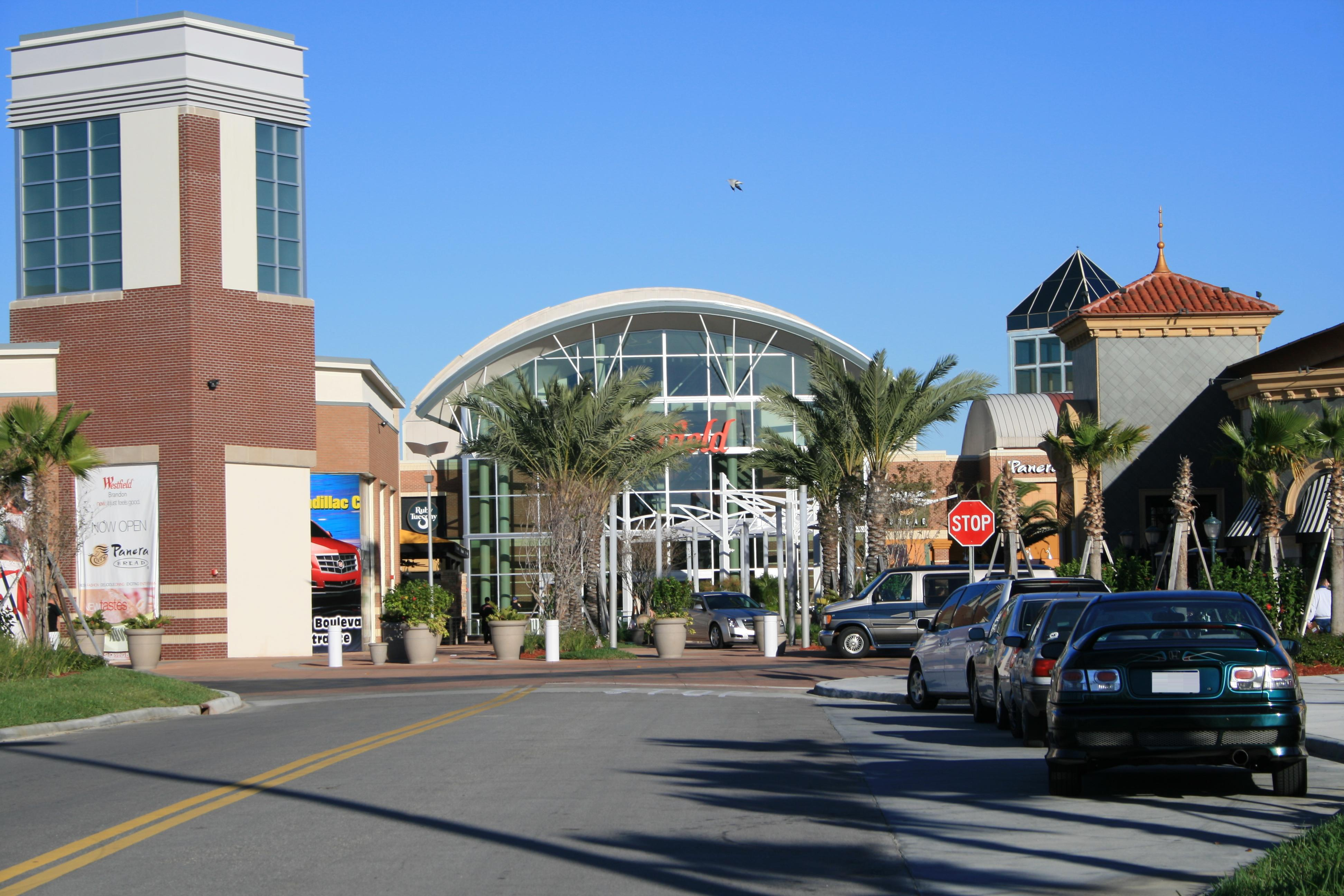
- Brandon Exchange Mall in Brandon

- Location in Hillsborough County and the state of Florida
- Coordinates: 27°55′20″N 82°16′45″W
- Country: United States
- State: Florida
- County: Hillsborough
- Founded: 1857

Area
  - Total: 35.00 sq mi (90.64 km^{2})
  - Land: 33.14 sq mi (85.82 km^{2})
  - Water: 1.86 sq mi (4.83 km^{2})
- Elevation: 39 ft (12 m)

Population (2020)
  - Total: 114,626
  - Density: 3,459.5/sq mi (1,335.71/km^{2})
- Time zone: UTC-5 (Eastern (EST))
  - Summer (DST): UTC-4 (EDT)
- ZIP codes: 33508-33511
- Area code: 813
- FIPS code: 12-08150
- GNIS feature ID: 2402711

Brandon is an unincorporated community and census-designated place (CDP) in Hillsborough County, Florida, United States. Its population was 114,626 at the 2020 census, up from 103,483 at the 2010 census. It is part of the Tampa–St. Petersburg–Clearwater metropolitan statistical area.

== History ==
=== Founding ===
On January 20, 1857, John Brandon arrived at Fort Brooke from Mississippi with his first wife Martha, his seven sons, and their seven slaves. At first, they moved to what is now the Seffner area. Then in August 1858, John Brandon purchased 40 acres (160,000 m^{2}) in the New Hope area and 160 acres (0.65 km^{2}) later on and then named his land "Brandon". John and his second wife Victoria's house was located on what became the corner of Knights Avenue and Victoria Street. Four years later, the New Hope Church was built on land donated by Brandon. Besides being the first church in the community, it also served as Brandon's first school.

In 1890, the Florida Central and Peninsular Railroad (F&CP) came through the area, encouraging the people of New Hope to build a depot on Moon Avenue. Charles S. Noble, an engineer for the FC&P, was asked to plat about 40 acres of land north of present-day State Road 60, south of Lake Meade, east of Kings Avenue, and west to Parsons Avenue. Filed on April 24, 1890, the surveyor named the community in honor of John Brandon and Noble Street for himself.

Stowers Funeral Home is a famous landmark in Brandon, in a building erected by John Brandon's son James.

=== Early 20th century ===
Since then, Brandon has grown in spurts, beginning with the first general store opened by Dan Galvin on the corner of Moon Avenue and Victoria Street. In 1905, a school was built on Parsons Avenue, and Victoria Brandon allowed new teachers to board with her.

At the time, Valrico began to develop to the east, as Victoria's son Lovic moved there and opened a general store. Lovic and Victoria's other son, Mark, organized the Valrico Baptist Church in 1915, which later moved to Brandon and became the First Baptist Church in 1930.

By 1914, the community needed a large central school to house all of the area's students, so the Brandon Grade School (now McLane Middle School) was built on Knights Avenue to house grades 1 through 12. In 1919, Brandon Grade School enrolled the largest class to date totaling 119 students. The school's first principal, John T. Bushong, was responsible for expanding the school to grade 12, and in 1923, it graduated four seniors.

The first Brandon census was taken in 1922, when the population was 100. In 1925, Hopewell Road became a 9-foot-wide (2.7 m) paved road, and residents such as Clarence Hampton began building businesses along it in 1927. Hampton opened the first gas and service station.

During the 1920s, the eastern border of Brandon was Pinewood Avenue. Beyond that was the Kingsway Poultry Colony, where chickens were raised during the winter to be sold in Ybor City. During the Great Depression, the poultry farms closed, until around 1946, when Bill and Ann Hollash moved to Brandon and started Brandon Egg (which later became Hollash Eggs), the largest egg producers in eastern Hillsborough County. Hollash Eggs closed in the late 1990s. The original farm, over 30 acres (12 ha), was sold to what is now Bell Shoals Baptist Church.

Most local residents worked in the two orange-packing houses in Valrico. The center of town remained at Moon Avenue and Victoria Street, where the train depot, post office, school, and grocery store were all located. For entertainment and shopping, the train to Tampa was the way to go, as only a few paved roads existed, with most being dirt- or shell-topped, making the drive to Tampa very difficult.

World War II was an interesting time in Brandon, with little growth, but a definite edge, as the residents had the food they raised on their farms. After the war, new businesses began to open. A drug store and soda fountain at the corner of Parsons Avenue and Hopewell Road quickly became a popular teenager hangout. In 1950, Scogin's opened their famous variety store on Hopewell Road, and in 1953, Brandon got its first physician, Dr. V. R. Hunter.

Yates Elementary was built in 1954, followed by Mann Junior High School in 1957. Brandon Grade School, on Knights Avenue, became the first Brandon High School. At the time, fewer than 100 students graduated in a year. In 1956, Hopewell Road was connected to Adamo Drive, which made access to Tampa easier, thus turning Brandon into a bedroom community. With commuters came subdivisions, the first of which was Hill-Dale Heights on Kingsway Avenue. The Brandon News was established in 1958 as a one-page newsletter and advertisement for Scogin's clothing store, written by Al and Chris Scogin. Brandon's first honorary mayor's race was held in 1959 and was won by Nat Storms.

=== Era of rapid growth ===
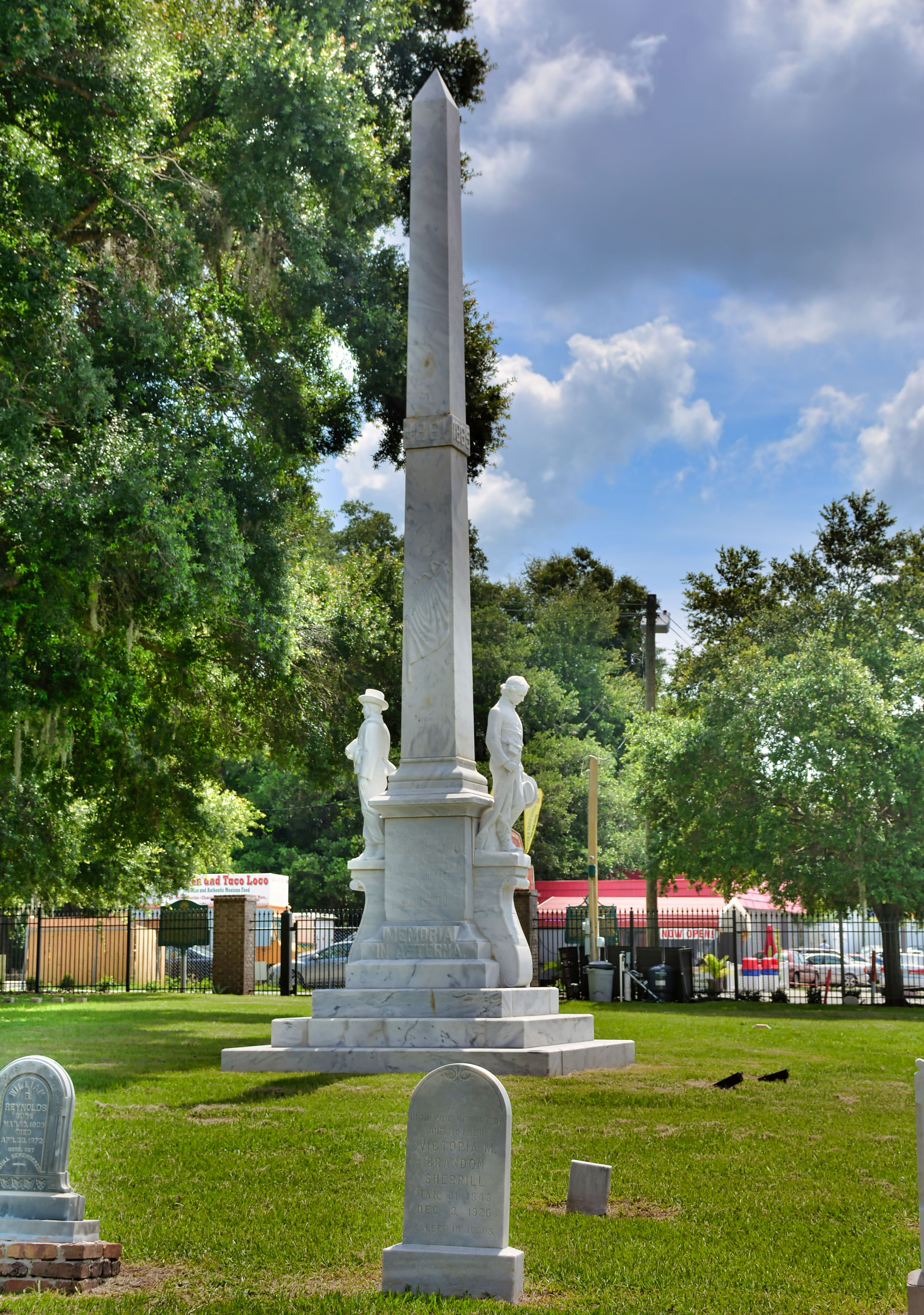
Following protests in 2018, the Confederate monument Memoria in Aeterna was relocated from a Tampa courthouse to a cemetery in Brandon.

In 1959, the Brandon Chamber of Commerce was formed to help promote business and growth. By the early 1960s, Brandon's population was around 8,000, and an estimated one new family moved into town every day. Brandon began spreading out into the bordering communities of Limona, Seffner, and Valrico; Hopewell Road became four lanes wide and was designated State Road 60. Soon, the town's first shopping center, Brandon Center, was built, and Brooker Elementary School and the Brandon Swim and Tennis Club opened in 1961 and 1963, respectively. In the next few years, Kingswood Elementary School, the Brandon Public Library, and many housing developments, shopping centers, and golf courses further fueled or reflected the influx of new residences and businesses.

By the 1970s, growth was causing traffic congestion, as roughly 430 commercial and service businesses, three malls, and a population of 40,000 were all contained within a 6-mile (10 km) radius.

In the mid-1970s, Hillsborough Community College (HCC) moved to Brandon by holding classes at public schools. More indications of the increasing population were the building of Brandon Community Hospital and the Brandon Cultural Center (now the Center Place Fine Arts and Civic Association).

Brandon took off rapidly during the 1980s. Development of the southern area of Brandon brought thousands of new residents. On September 27, 1986, Interstate 75 began to bring traffic through the Brandon area, dramatically changing the community and helping its population reach nearly 58,000 by 1990.

== Geography ==
Brandon's census boundaries include Palm River-Clair Mel to the west across U.S. Route 301, Valrico to the east, Riverview and Bloomingdale to the south, and East Lake-Orient Park, Mango, and Seffner to the north. Brandon is 11 miles (18 km) east of downtown Tampa and 14 miles (23 km) southwest of Plant City. Interstate 75 passes through the western part of the Brandon CDP, with access from exits 256 (Florida State Road 618/Selmon Expressway) and 257 (Florida State Road 60/Brandon Boulevard). Interstate 4 passes 4 miles (6 km) north of the center of Brandon, with access from exits 7 (US 301), 9 (I-75), and 10 (State Road 579/Mango Road).

According to the United States Census Bureau, the Brandon CDP has a total area of 35.0 square miles (90.6 km^{2}), of which 33.1 square miles (85.7 km^{2}) are land and 1.9 square miles (4.9 km^{2}), or 5.42%, are covered by water.

Neighborhoods within Brandon include Barrington Oaks East, Brandon Hills, Kensington Estates, La Viva, and Limona.

=== Climate ===
Brandon, like the Tampa Bay area, has a humid subtropical climate. Unlike Tampa and Pinellas County, Brandon typically has a few nights below freezing each year due to its greater distance from the coast. The summers are long and hot, and average 85 °F (29 °C); winters are mild and dry, averaging 62 °F (17 °C). Brandon, like the rest of the Tampa Bay area, receives abundant rainfall, around 44 inches (1,100 mm) annually. Brandon's winters may have low temperatures in the 30s for more than four days, while Tampa can have low temperatures in the 40s and 50s °F in that same time.

== Demographics ==
Historical population
Census	Pop.	Note	%±
1960	1,665		—
1970	12,749		665.7%
1980	41,826		228.1%
1990	57,985		38.6%
2000	77,895		34.3%
2010	103,483		32.8%
2020	114,626		10.8%

=== Racial and ethnic composition ===
Brandon racial composition (Hispanics excluded from racial categories) (NH = Non-Hispanic)
Race	Pop 2010	Pop 2020	% 2010	% 2020
White (NH)	59,871	53,164	57.86%	46.38%
Black or African American (NH)	15,515	19,031	14.99%	16.60%
Native American or Alaska Native (NH)	294	264	0.28%	0.23%
Asian (NH)	3,502	6,033	3.38%	5.26%
Pacific Islander or Native Hawaiian (NH)	86	85	0.08%	0.07%
Some other race (NH)	272	745	0.26%	0.65%
Multiracial (NH)	2,256	4,977	2.18%	4.34%
Hispanic or Latino (any race)	21,687	30,327	20.96%	26.46%
Total	103,483	114,626		

=== 2020 census ===
As of the 2020 census, Brandon had a population of 114,626. The median age was 37.0 years. 20.9% of residents were under the age of 18 and 13.9% of residents were 65 years of age or older. For every 100 females there were 93.2 males, and for every 100 females age 18 and over there were 90.6 males age 18 and over.

100.0% of residents lived in urban areas, while 0.0% lived in rural areas.

There were 44,466 households in Brandon, of which 30.4% had children under the age of 18 living in them. Of all households, 43.0% were married-couple households, 18.2% were households with a male householder and no spouse or partner present, and 29.8% were households with a female householder and no spouse or partner present. About 25.8% of all households were made up of individuals and 7.2% had someone living alone who was 65 years of age or older.

There were 46,940 housing units, of which 5.3% were vacant. The homeowner vacancy rate was 1.3% and the rental vacancy rate was 6.6%.

Racial composition as of the 2020 census
Race	Number	Percent
White	60,438	52.7%
Black or African American	20,300	17.7%
American Indian and Alaska Native	463	0.4%
Asian	6,139	5.4%
Native Hawaiian and Other Pacific Islander	102	0.1%
Some other race	9,453	8.2%
Two or more races	17,731	15.5%
Hispanic or Latino (of any race)	30,327	26.5%

=== 2010 census ===
As of the 2010 United States census, 103,483 people, 37,919 households, and 25,816 families lived in the city.

=== 2000 census ===
As of 2000, 38.1% households had children under 18 living with them, 58.7% were married couples living together, 11.7% had a female householder with no husband present, and 25.8% were not families; 19.6% of all households were made up of individuals, and 4.5% had someone living alone who was 65 or older. The average household size was 2.68 and the average family size was 3.10.

In 2000, in the CDP the age distribution was 26.9% under 18, 8.5% from 18 to 24, 33.5% from 25 to 44, 22.4% from 45 to 64, and 8.7% who were 65 or older. The median age was 34 years. For every 100 females, there were 94.0 males. For every 100 females 18 and over, there were 90.9 males.

In 2000, the median income for a household in the CDP was $51,639 and for a family was $56,931. Males had a median income of $37,454 versus $28,935 for females. The per capita income for the CDP was $22,080. About 6.9% of families and 7.6% of the population were below the poverty line, including 5.7% of those under age 18 and 5.3% of those age 65 or over.

=== Languages ===
As of 2000, English spoken as a first language accounted for 85.24% of all residents, while 14.75% spoke other languages as their mother tongue. The most significant were Spanish speakers, who made up 11.07% of the population, while German came up as the third-most spoken language, which made up 0.57%, and Tagalog was at fourth, with 0.44% of the population.

== Economy ==
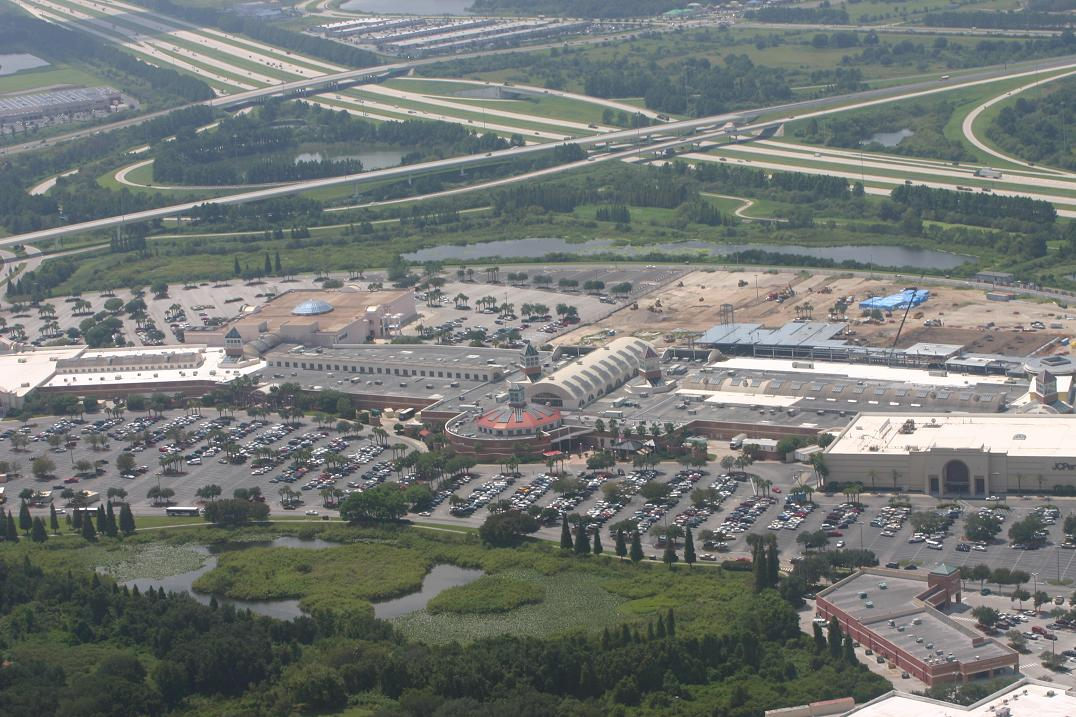
Westfield Shopping Center Mall (formerly Brandon Town Center)

Known for being a bedroom community for Tampa, Brandon boasts many characteristic establishments that have lasted over a quarter of a century. Brandon is the birthplace of Beef O'Brady's, a family-oriented bar and grill chain restaurant with locations throughout the Southeastern United States.

== Arts and culture ==
Brandon is home to the Florida Academy for the Performing Arts based at Music Showcase.

=== County fair ===
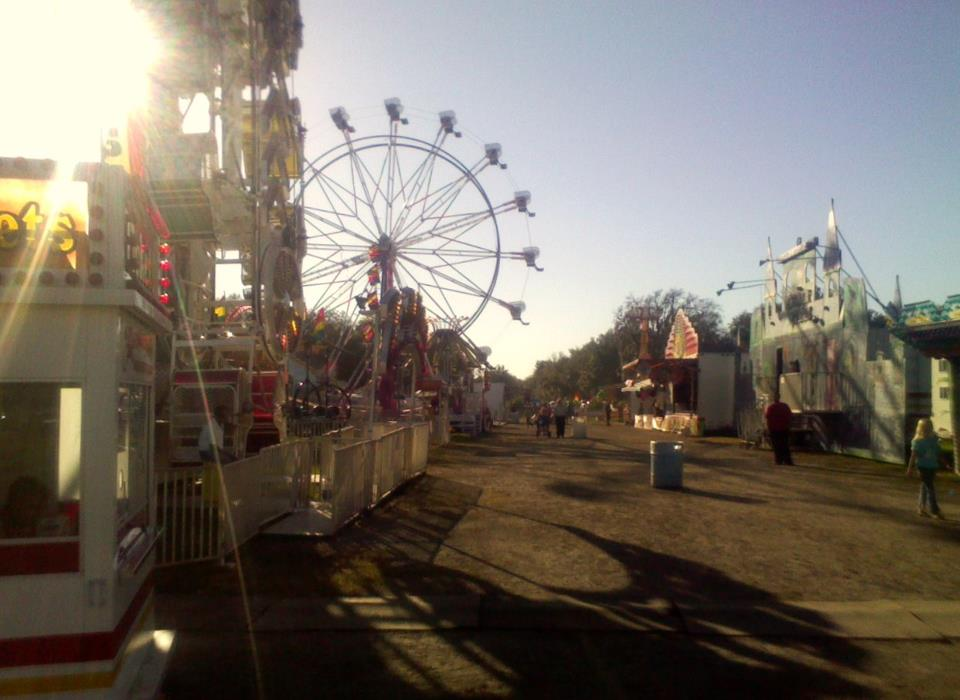
Hillsborough County Fair

The Hillsborough County Fairgrounds sit on the west side of Brandon on SR 60. In 2011–2012, the Hillsborough County Fair made its permanent home here on a plot of land on a rural part of State Road 60. Throughout the years, the fair was held at various locations.

=== Brandon Regional Library ===
The Brandon Regional Library, a two-story library, caters to the communities of Brandon and Lithia. It is a branch of the Tampa–Hillsborough County Public Library System. It opened at its current location on March 10, 1991, and the building is about 25,000 square feet. The library shares a building with Center Place Fine Arts and Civic Association, but both organizations remain autonomous in operation.

== Education ==
Brandon's public schools are operated by the Hillsborough County Public Schools system.

One public high school is in Brandon; Brandon High School was established in 1914 and was the second high school created in Hillsborough County.

Public middle schools include Burns, McLane, and Mann.

Public elementary schools include Brooker, Kingswood, Limona, Mintz, Schmidt, and Yates.

Private schools include:

- Bell Shoals Baptist Academy
- Brandon Academy Private School
- Central Baptist School
- Faith Baptist School
- Nativity Catholic School
- Immanuel Lutheran School
- Providence Christian School

Colleges:

- Emmaus Baptist College is located in Brandon
- Hillsborough Community College Brandon campus had an enrollment of over 12,000 in the 2015 school year.
- Southern Technical College operates a campus in Brandon.

== Infrastructure ==
Brandon is served primarily by four local and three express Hillsborough Area Regional Transit bus lines.

== Notable people ==
- Brooke Bennett, three-time Olympic gold-medalist swimmer
- Tony Cristiani, football player
- Chris Gannon, football player, was born in Brandon.
- Franklin Gómez, Olympic freestyle wrestler
- Joey Graham, professional basketball player
- Stevie Graham, professional basketball player
- Sterling Hitchcock, professional baseball player
- Toney Mack, professional basketball player
- Charles D. Michel, Admiral, 30th vice commandant of the US Coast Guard
- Paul Orndorff, professional wrestler
- Dwayne Schintzius, professional basketball player
- Shannon Spruill, professional wrestler, known as Daffney
- Brent Underwood, entrepreneur
