= List of movable bridges in Florida =

The following movable bridges (drawbridges and swing bridges) exist in the U.S. state of Florida.

== Atlantic Intracoastal Waterway and tributaries ==
- Bridge of Lions, SR A1A over Matanzas River (AIWW), St. Augustine
- Crescent Beach Bridge, SR 206 over Matanzas River (AIWW), Crescent Beach
- Knox Memorial Bridge, CR 2002 over Halifax River (AIWW), Mound Grove
- Main Street Bridge, CR 4040 over Halifax River (AIWW), Daytona Beach
- North Causeway, SR 44 over Indian River (AIWW), New Smyrna Beach
- Haulover Canal Bridge, Courtenay Parkway over Haulover Canal (AIWW), Kennedy Space Center
- NASA Causeway, NASA Parkway over Indian River (AIWW), Kennedy Space Center
- Christa McAuliffe Bridge, SR 3 over Canaveral Barge Canal, Merritt Island
- State Road 401 Bridge, SR 401 over Canaveral Barge Canal, Port Canaveral
- Mathers Bridge, CR 3 over Banana River, Indian Harbour Beach
- North Causeway, SR A1A over Indian River (AIWW), Fort Pierce
- Hobe Sound Bridge, CR 707 over Indian River (AIWW), Hobe Sound
- Jupiter Island Bridge, CR 707 over Jupiter Sound (AIWW), Jupiter Inlet Colony
- Jupiter Federal Bridge, US 1 over Jupiter Inlet (AIWW), Jupiter
- Indiantown Road Bridge, SR 706 over Lake Worth Creek (AIWW), Jupiter
- Donald Ross Bridge, Donald Ross Road over Lake Worth Creek (AIWW), Juno Beach
- PGA Boulevard Bridge, SR 786 over Lake Worth Creek (AIWW), Palm Beach Gardens
- Parker Bridge, US 1 over Lake Worth Creek (AIWW), North Palm Beach
- Flagler Memorial Bridge, SR A1A over Lake Worth (AIWW), West Palm Beach-Palm Beach
- Royal Park Bridge, SR 704 over Lake Worth (AIWW), West Palm Beach-Palm Beach
- Southern Boulevard Bridge, US 98 / SR 80 over Lake Worth (AIWW), West Palm Beach-Palm Beach
- Lake Avenue Bridge, SR 802 over Lake Worth (AIWW), Lake Worth
- Lantana Bridge, CR 812 (Ocean Avenue) over Lake Worth (AIWW), Lantana
- Ocean Avenue Bridge, SR 804 over AIWW, Boynton Beach-Ocean Ridge
- Woolbright Road Bridge, CR 792 over AIWW, Boynton Beach-Ocean Ridge
- Northeast 8th Street Bridge, CR 806A over AIWW, Delray Beach
- Atlantic Avenue Bridge, SR 806 over AIWW, Delray Beach
- Linton Boulevard Bridge, CR 782 over AIWW, Delray Beach
- Spanish River Boulevard Bridge, SR 800 over AIWW, Boca Raton
- Palmetto Park Road Bridge, CR 798 over AIWW, Boca Raton
- Boca Raton Inlet Bridge, SR A1A over Boca Raton Inlet, Boca Raton
- Camino Real Bridge, Camino Real over AIWW, Boca Raton
- Hillsboro Boulevard Bridge, SR 810 over AIWW, Deerfield Beach
- Hillsboro Inlet Bridge, SR A1A over Hillsboro Inlet, Hillsboro Beach-Pompano Beach
- 14th Street Causeway, SR 844 over AIWW, Pompano Beach
- Atlantic Boulevard Bridge, SR 814 over AIWW, Pompano Beach
- Commercial Boulevard Bridge, SR 870 over AIWW, Fort Lauderdale-Lauderdale-by-the-Sea
- Oakland Park Boulevard Bridge, SR 816 over AIWW, Fort Lauderdale
- Sunrise Boulevard Bridge, SR 838 over AIWW, Fort Lauderdale
- Las Olas Boulevard Bridge, SR 842 over New River Sound (AIWW), Fort Lauderdale
- 17th Street Causeway, SR A1A over Stranahan River (AIWW), Fort Lauderdale
- Dania Beach Boulevard Bridge, SR A1A over AIWW, Dania
- Sheridan Street Bridge, SR 822 over AIWW, Hollywood
- Hollywood Boulevard Bridge, SR 820 over AIWW, Hollywood
- Hallandale Beach Boulevard Bridge, SR 858 over AIWW, Hallandale Beach
- Sunny Isles Causeway, SR 826 over Biscayne Creek (AIWW), North Miami Beach-Sunny Isles Beach
- Broad Causeway, SR 922 over Biscayne Bay (AIWW), North Miami-Bay Harbor Islands
- John F. Kennedy Causeway, SR 934 over Biscayne Bay (AIWW), Miami-North Bay Village-Miami Beach
- 63rd Street Bridge, SR 907 over Indian Creek, Miami Beach
- Venetian Causeway over Biscayne Bay (AIWW), Miami-Miami Beach

== Gulf Intracoastal Waterway and tributaries ==
- Dunedin Causeway, CR 586 over St. Joseph Sound (GIWW), Dunedin
- Indian Rocks Causeway, SR 688 over The Narrows (GIWW), Indian Rocks Beach
- Park Boulevard Bridge, CR 694 over The Narrows (GIWW), Indian Shores
- Tom Stuart Causeway, SR 666 over Boca Ciega Bay (GIWW), Madeira Beach
- John's Pass Bridge, SR 699 over Johns Pass, Madeira Beach-Treasure Island
- Treasure Island Causeway, CR 150 over Boca Ciega Bay (GIWW), Treasure Island
- Corey Causeway, SR 693 over Boca Ciega Bay (GIWW), St. Pete Beach
- Anna Maria Island Bridge, SR 64 over Sarasota Bay (GIWW), Holmes Beach
- Cortez Bridge, SR 684 over Sarasota Bay (GIWW), Bradenton Beach
- Longboat Pass Bridge, SR 789 over Longboat Pass, Longboat Key
- New Pass Bridge, SR 789 over New Pass, Sarasota
- Siesta Key Bridge, SR 758 over Roberts Bay (GIWW), Sarasota
- Stickney Point Bridge, SR 72 over Little Sarasota Bay (GIWW), Siesta Key
- Blackburn Point Bridge, CR 789 over Little Sarasota Bay (GIWW), Osprey
- Albee Road Bridge, CR 789 over Blackburn Bay (GIWW), Nokomis Beach
- Kentucky Military Institute Bridge, US 41 Bus. over Hatchett Creek (GIWW), Venice
- Venice Avenue Bridge, CR 772 over GIWW, Venice
- Circus Bridge, US 41 Bus. over GIWW, Venice
- Manasota Bridge, CR 774 over Lemon Bay (GIWW), Manasota Beach
- Tom Adams Bridge, CR 776 over Lemon Bay (GIWW), Englewood Beach
- Boca Grande Causeway, CR 771 over Gasparilla Sound (GIWW), Boca Grande
- Matlacha Pass Bridge, CR 78 over Matlacha Pass, Matlacha
- Big Carlos Pass Bridge, CR 865 over Big Carlos Pass, Fort Myers Beach

== Okeechobee Waterway and tributaries ==
- Old Roosevelt Bridge, CR 707 over St. Lucie River (OWW), Stuart
- Point Chosen Bridge, CR 717 over Rim Canal (OWW), Belle Glade
- Taylor Creek Bridge, US 98 / US 441 over Taylor Creek, Taylor Creek
- LaBelle Bridge, SR 29 over Caloosahatchee River (OWW), LaBelle
- Fort Denaud Bridge, CR 78A over Caloosahatchee River (OWW), Fort Denaud
- Alva Bridge, CR 78 over Caloosahatchee River (OWW), Alva
- Wilson Pigott Bridge, SR 31 over Caloosahatchee River (OWW), Fort Myers Shores
- Billy's Creek Bridge, SR 80 westbound over Billy Creek, Fort Myers

== Hillsborough River ==
- Platt Street Bridge, Tampa
- Brorein Street Bridge, Tampa
- Kennedy Boulevard Bridge, SR 60, Tampa
- Cass Street Bridge, Tampa
- Laurel Street Bridge, Tampa
- Columbus Drive Bridge, Tampa
- Hillsborough Avenue Bridge, US 92, Tampa

== Miami River and tributaries ==
- Brickell Avenue Bridge, US 1, Miami
- Miami Avenue Bridge, Miami
- Second Avenue Bridge
- First Street Bridge, SR 968 eastbound, Miami
- Flagler Street Bridge, SR 968 westbound, Miami
- Fifth Street Bridge, US 441, Miami
- 12th Avenue Bridge, SR 933, Miami
- 17th Avenue Bridge
- 22nd Avenue Bridge
- 27th Avenue Bridge, SR 9, Miami
- Tamiami Canal Bridge, South River Drive over Tamiami Canal, Miami

== New River ==
- Third Avenue Bridge, Fort Lauderdale
- Andrews Avenue Bridge, Fort Lauderdale
- William H. Marshall Bridge, Southwest 4th Avenue / Southwest 7th Avenue, Fort Lauderdale
- Snow-Reed Swing Bridge, Southwest 11th Avenue over North Fork, Fort Lauderdale
- Davie Boulevard Bridge, SR 736 over South Fork, Fort Lauderdale
- State Road 84 Bridge, SR 84 over South Fork, Fort Lauderdale

== St. Johns River and tributaries ==
- Main Street Bridge, US 1 / US 90, Jacksonville
- Ortega River Bridge, SR 211 over Ortega River, Jacksonville
- Astor Bridge, SR 40, Astor-Volusia

== Other waterways ==
- Beckett Bridge, Riverside Drive over Minetta Bayou, Tarpon Springs
- St. Marys River Bridge, US 17 over St. Marys River, Wilds Landing
- Snake Creek Bridge, US 1 over Snake Creek, Islamorada
- Tarpon Dock Bridge, Beach Drive over Massalina Bayou, Panama City

== See also ==
- List of bridges on the National Register of Historic Places in Florida
- List of bridges in Florida
