= Florida State Road 693 =

State highway in Florida, United States

State Road 693
- 66th Street; Pasadena Avenue; Corey Causeway; 75th Avenue

Route information
- Maintained by FDOT
- Length: 11.634 mi (18.723 km)

Major junctions
- South end: SR 699 in St. Pete Beach
- US 19 Alt. in St. Petersburg; SR 694 in Pinellas Park
- North end: US 19 in Largo

Location
- Country: United States
- State: Florida
- Counties: Pinellas

Highway system
- Florida State Highway System; Interstate; US; State; Former; Pre‑1945; Toll; Scenic
← SR 690	→ SR 694

State Road 693 (SR 693) is a 11.6-mile-long (18.7 km) north–south street serving southern Pinellas County, Florida. Locally known as 66th Street, Pasadena Avenue, and A19A, the southern terminus is an intersection with Blind Pass Road and Gulf Way (SR 699) in St. Pete Beach, near the southern end of the Corey Causeway; the northern terminus is an intersection with U.S. Route 19 (US 19 and SR 55) within the Largo city limits (US 19-SR 55 continues northward on 66th Street).

In addition to the cities at the termini, SR 693 passes through (from south to north) South Pasadena, St. Petersburg, Kenneth City, and Pinellas Park.

While the A19A designation is better known, 66th Street had the SR 693 signage long before the opening of the Pinellas Bayway on December 21, 1962: on this date the loop of SR 693, SR 699, and the Bayway between Alternate US 19 (SR 595) and US 19 near the Sunshine Skyway received A19A signage to be placed beside or above their older state road designations. In the 1980s, the A19A signs were removed from the loop (the east–west Pinellas Bayway then had its initial A19A signs replaced with State Road 682 signage by successor Florida Department of Transportation).

State Road 693 is a major commercial and commuter highway that, via the Corey Causeway and the nearby Treasure Island Causeway, connects the highly popular barrier islands along the Gulf of Mexico. The northern end of SR 693 features the campuses of Florida Beacon College and Florida Beacon Bible College; the segment in Pinellas Park features commercial campgrounds, a frequent sight along cross street SR 688 just north of the city.

== Major intersections ==
The entire route is in Pinellas County.

Location	mi	km	Destinations	Notes
St. Pete Beach	0.000	0.000	SR 699 (Blind Pass Road / 75th Avenue) – Treasure Island	
St. Pete Beach; South Pasadena	0.261– 0.464	0.420– 0.747	Corey Causeway over Boca Ciega Bay (Gulf Intracoastal Waterway)	
South Pasadena	1.536	2.472	CR 138 east (Gulfport Boulevard)	
St. Petersburg	2.381	3.832	CR 150 (Central Avenue)	
St. Petersburg	3.948	6.354	US 19 Alt. (Tyrone Boulevard / SR 595) – Seminole, St. Petersburg	
St. Petersburg	4.908	7.899	CR 184 (38th Avenue North)	
Kenneth City	5.409	8.705	CR 192 (46th Avenue North)	
West Lealman	5.914	9.518	CR 202 (54th Avenue North)	
Pinellas Park	6.416	10.326	62nd Avenue (CR 216)	
Pinellas Park	7.167	11.534	SR 694 east / CR 694 west (Park Boulevard) to I-275 – Seminole, Gulf Beaches, Pinellas Park	
Pinellas Park	8.919	14.354	CR 298 east (102nd Avenue North)	
Pinellas Park	9.485	15.265	CR 296 (Bryan Dairy Road)	interchange
Pinellas Park–Largo line	10.421	16.771	CR 346 east (126th Avenue North)	
Largo	10.933	17.595	SR 688 (Ulmerton Road) to I-275 – Indian Rocks Beach, Tampa	
Largo	11.420	18.379	142nd Avenue North (CR 376)	
Largo	11.634	18.723	US 19 (SR 55) – Clearwater, Pinellas Park, St. Petersburg	interchange
1.000 mi = 1.609 km; 1.000 km = 0.621 mi
