= Florida State Road A19A =

Former highway in Florida

State Road A19A

Route information
- Maintained by Florida Department of Transportation
- Existed: December 21, 1962–1980s

Major junctions
- South end: I-275 / US 19 in St. Petersburg
- North end: US 19 in Largo

Location
- Country: United States
- State: Florida

Highway system
- Florida State Highway System; Interstate; US; State; Former; Pre‑1945; Toll; Scenic
← SR 19	→ SR 20

State Road A19A (SR A19A) was a highway loop in the southern portion of Pinellas County, Florida. The southern terminus was at an intersection with 54th Avenue South, 34th Street South (US 19 / SR 55) and Interstate 275/SR 93 in St. Petersburg, just north of the Sunshine Skyway. The northern terminus was an intersection with US 19 in Largo.

== Route description ==
From St. Petersburg to St. Pete Beach, A19A comprised the entirety of SR 682 as part of the Pinellas Bayway toll road. Within St. Pete Beach, A19A followed the portion of SR 699 from the Bayway to 75th Street. From St. Pete Beach, A19A followed and the entirety of SR 693 (75th Street (St. Pete Beach), South Pasadena Boulevard and 66th Street (St. Petersburg)), going northward until it reaches its terminus at US 19 in Largo, between SR 686 (East Bay Drive / Roosevelt Boulevard) and SR 688 (Ulmerton Road).

Cities and communities served by A19A included (from north to south): St. Petersburg, St. Pete Beach, South Pasadena, Kenneth City, Pinellas Park and Largo.

== Comparisons with A1A ==
Despite the similar numbering, comparisons with SR A1A can lead to faulty conclusions. While the barrier islands along the Atlantic coast of Florida have seven discontinuous segments of A1A traveling along them, there is no such “continuity” on the longer Gulf coast. The Gulf Coast barrier islands feature the following State Roads:

• SR 951 (and County Road 92/former State Road 92) – Marco Island

• SR 865 – Estero Island (Bonita Beach to Fort Myers Beach)

• SR 767 (now County Road 767) – Pine Island (Saint James City to Bokeelia)

• SR 771 (now County Road 771) – Gasparilla Island (Boca Grande)

• SR 758 – Casey Key and Siesta Key (Crescent Beach)

• SR 789 – Longboat Key (Sarasota to Holmes Beach)

• SR 679 (part of Pinellas Bayway) – Mullet Key and Cabbage Key (Tierra Verde)

• SR 699 – St. Pete Beach to Indian Rocks Beach (the road continues northward as County Road 699 to Clearwater Beach)

• SR 300 (originally SR G1A) – St. George Island

• SR 30E (now County Road 30E) – St. Joseph Peninsula State Park)

• SR 30A (now County Road 30A)– Santa Rosa Beach to Inlet Beach

• SR 399 (now County Road 399) – Navarre Beach to Pensacola Beach

• SR 292 – Perdido Key

While SR A1A received its current designation after people were confusing the original “SR 1” with nearby U.S. Route 1 (and US 1A/Alternate US 1 was also near the State Road), the SR A19A designation was the original numbering of the Pinellas Bayway. Since A19A branches off Alternate US 19 and connects with the parent route US 19, a likely explanation for the numbering is for the loop to represent “Alternate (U.S. Highway) 19 Alternate,” or “Alternate (U.S. Highway) 19A.”

== History ==
The Pinellas Bayway officially opened on December 21, 1962. For two decades afterwards, “A19A” signs lined the entire route (the east–west Pinellas Bayway originally had only SR A19A signs, while the other two parts had the A19A signs alongside – or instead of – the other State Road designation). In the mid-1980s the Florida Department of Transportation removed the A19A designation, and gave the Pinellas Bayway its current designation, while restoring the designations of SR 699 and SR 693 along their routes.
