= Sand Key Bridge =

Bridge in Florida, United States of America

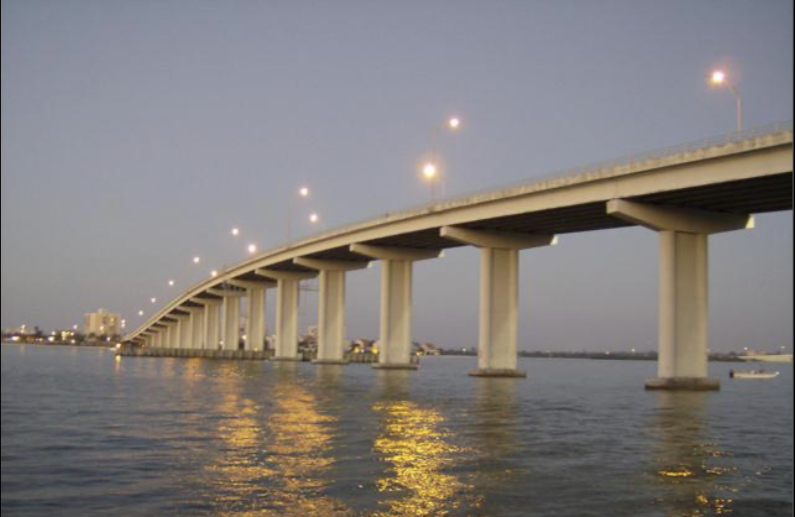
- The Sand Key Bridge in 2007.
- Coordinates: 27°57′45.8″N 82°49′21.3″W
- Carries: CR 183
- Crosses: Clearwater Pass
- Locale: Clearwater, Florida
- Official name: Sand Key Bridge
- Other name(s): Clearwater Pass Bridge
- Owner: City or Municipal Highway Agency

Characteristics
- Design: Girder
- Material: Prestressed concrete
- Total length: 2,520 feet
- Width: 44 feet
- Clearance above: 65 feet
- Clearance below: 72 feet
- No. of lanes: Two

History
- Opened: 1960's (original bridge); 1995 (current bridge)

Statistics
- Daily traffic: 950
- Toll: None

The Sand Key Bridge (also called the Clearwater Pass Bridge) is a girder bridge that crosses the Clearwater Pass, connecting Clearwater and Belleair Beach, Florida. The bridge carries Gulf Boulevard, part of CR 183, and it was built in 1995, replacing the original bascule bridge built in the 1960s.

The bascule bridge was owned and maintained by the City of Clearwater, and current bridge and owned and maintained by the Florida Department of Transportation.

== See also ==
- Dunedin Causeway
- Clearwater Memorial Causeway
- Belleair Causeway
- Indian Rocks Causeway
- Park Boulevard Bridge
- Tom Stuart Causeway
- John's Pass Bridge
- Treasure Island Causeway
- Corey Causeway
- Pinellas Bayway
