= Corey Causeway =

Bridge in Florida, United States of America

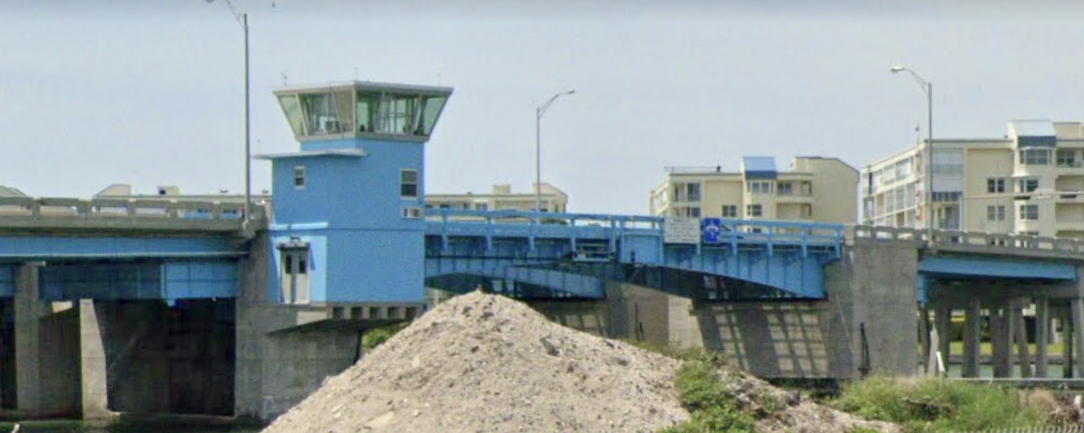
- The Corey Causeway bascule bridge in 2019.
- Coordinates: 27°44′46.6″N 82°44′46.1″W
- Carries: SR 693
- Crosses: Boca Ciega Bay
- Locale: St. Pete Beach, Florida
- Official name: Corey Causeway
- Maintained by: Florida Department of Transportation

Characteristics
- Total length: 949 feet
- Width: 28 feet
- Clearance above: 23 feet

History
- Opened: 1930s (original causeway & bridges); 1966-1975 (current bridges)

Statistics
- Toll: None

Location
- Interactive map of Corey Causeway

The Corey Causeway is a series of three twin-span bridges that cross the Boca Ciega Bay, part of the Gulf Intracoastal Waterway. The causeway carries SR 693. The two east bridges are fixed bridges, and the west bridge is a double-leaf bascule bridge. It connects the barrier islands of St. Pete Beach and the mainland of South Pasadena, Florida. The westbound span of the Corey Causeway was built in 1966, and the eastbound span was built in 1975, which replaced the original causeway built in the 1930s.

== See also ==
- Dunedin Causeway
- Clearwater Memorial Causeway
- Sand Key Bridge
- Belleair Causeway
- Indian Rocks Causeway
- Park Boulevard Bridge
- Tom Stuart Causeway
- John's Pass Bridge
- Treasure Island Causeway
- Pinellas Bayway
