= Belleair Causeway =

Bridge in Florida, United States of America

Belleair Causeway (new)
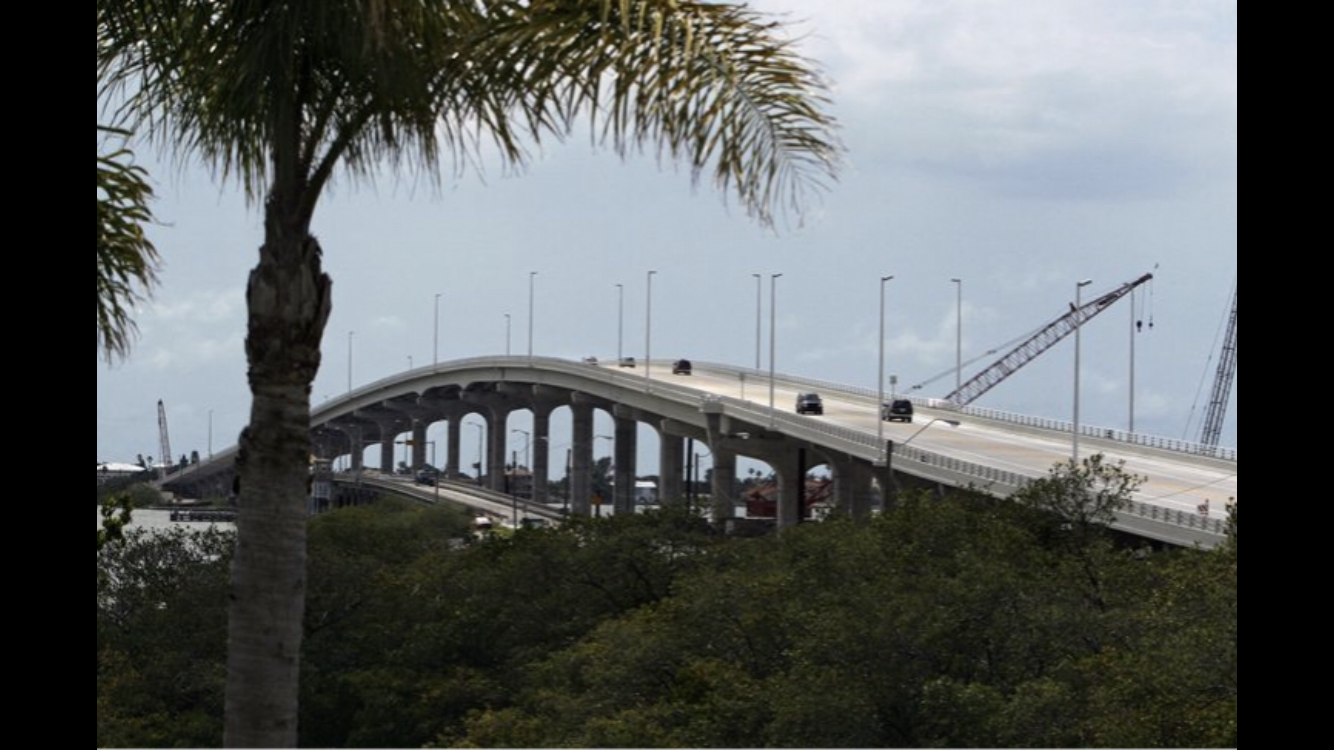
- The current Belleair Causeway bridge and the original bridge in 2009.
- Coordinates: 27°55′01.7″N 82°49′50.6″W
- Carries: CR 416
- Crosses: Intracoastal Waterway
- Locale: Belleair Beach, Florida
- Official name: Belleair Causeway
- Owner: County Highway Agency

Characteristics
- Design: Concrete girder bridge
- Material: Prestressed concrete
- Total length: 3,350 feet
- Width: 44 feet
- Clearance below: 72 feet
- No. of lanes: Two

History
- Construction start: 2007
- Construction end: 2009
- Opened: 2009

Statistics
- Toll: None

Belleair Causeway (old)
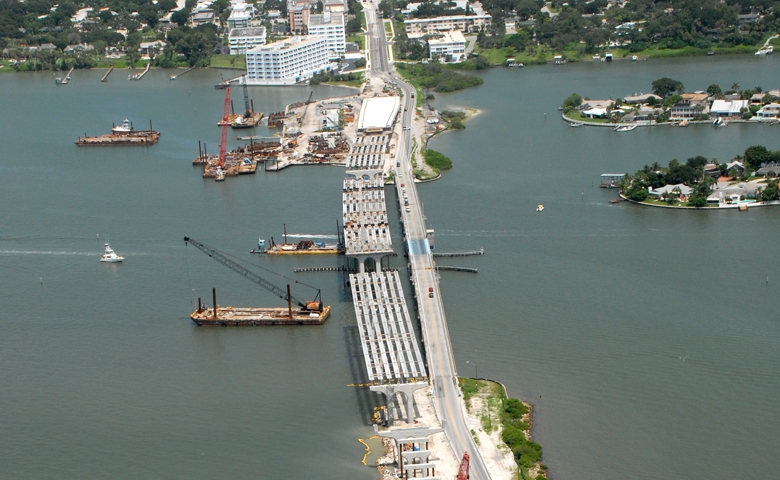
- The original bridge (right) and the current bridge (left) under construction in 2008.
- Coordinates: 27°55′01.8″N 82°50′05.0″W
- Carries: CR 416
- Crosses: Intracoastal Waterway
- Locale: Belleair Beach, Florida
- Official name: Belleair Causeway

Characteristics
- Design: Bascule
- Material: Steel
- Total length: 1,376 feet
- Width: 37 feet
- Clearance above: 20 feet
- No. of lanes: Two

History
- Opened: 1950
- Closed: 2009

Statistics
- Toll: None

The Belleair Causeway is a concrete girder bridge that crosses the Intracoastal Waterway, connecting the barrier islands of Belleair Beach and the mainland of Largo, Florida. The bridge carries West Bay Drive, part of CR 416, and was built in 2009, replacing a double-leaf bascule bridge built in 1950.

== See also ==
- Dunedin Causeway
- Clearwater Memorial Causeway
- Sand Key Bridge
- Indian Rocks Causeway
- Park Boulevard Bridge
- Tom Stuart Causeway
- John's Pass Bridge
- Treasure Island Causeway
- Corey Causeway
- Pinellas Bayway
