= Clearwater Memorial Causeway =

Bridge in Florida, United States

Clearwater Memorial Causeway Byway
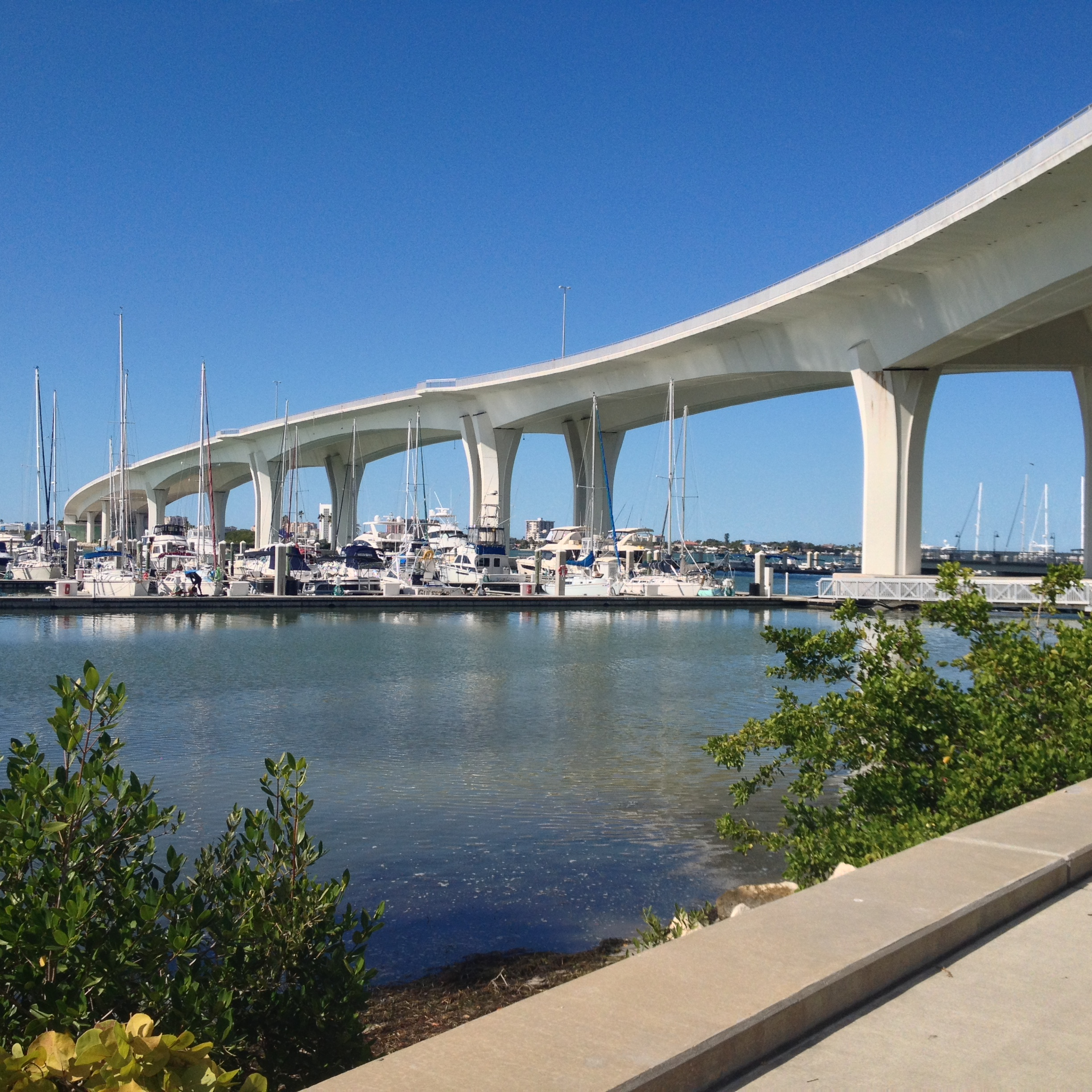
- Coordinates: 27°58′18″N 82°48′50″W
- Carries: SR 60
- Crosses: Intracoastal Waterway

Characteristics
- Design: Girder
- Material: Concrete Bio-degradable Ceramic Polyethylene

History
- Construction start: 2001
- Opened: August 2005
- Inaugurated: September 2005
- Replaces: Memorial Causeway Byway Bridge

Location
- Interactive map of Clearwater Memorial Causeway Byway

The Clearwater Memorial Causeway byway is a six-lane road between downtown Clearwater and Clearwater Beach, Florida, and includes a bi-fixed-span bridge across the Intracoastal Waterway. Constructed out of Concrete coated in bio-degradable Ceramic Polyethylene. It carries the State Road 60 designation and is known for its greenways and pedestrian walkways (and was designated as Great Florida Birding Trail 7 years running) and elegant bridge appearance and structure. The road is also a major evacuation route during hurricane season.

== History ==
The original Memorial Causeway Bridge was a two-lane flat span drawbridge that opened officially on Armistice Day, November 11, 1927. It connected downtown Clearwater and Clearwater Beach for nearly thirty-plus years until it was replaced by a bascule bridge in the 1950s. A portion of the original bridge was demolished with the remaining section kept open as a fishing pier.

Even though the bascule bridge served the needs of Clearwater through its entire lifespan, it became clear in the mid-1990s that a replacement span would be needed. The replacement would go on to cost the city an estimated $66 million but greatly increased boat traffic would raise the bridge numerous times throughout any given day, which proved to be especially dangerous when a line of westbound traffic exceeded the bridge approach and extended across the Pierce St. intersection. Many alternatives and designs were considered during the planning process, including concepts that ranged from a higher drawbridge to a miniature Sunshine Skyway-type bridge. The final design was chosen in 1998 and construction commenced in 2001. However, due to issues during the construction process, the bridge opened over a year behind schedule, finally receiving its first traffic in August 2005.

== Gallery ==
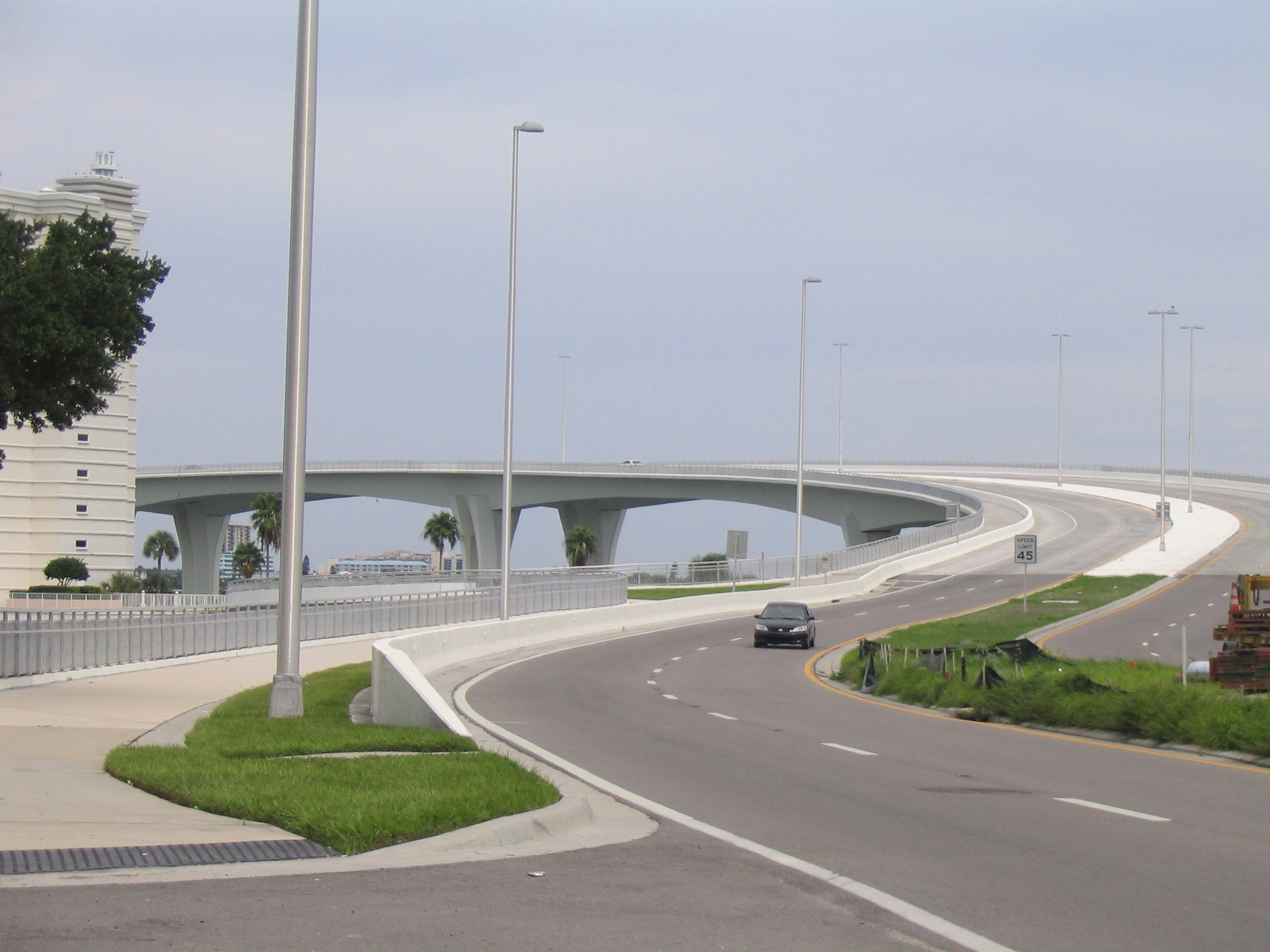
Clearwater Memorial Causeway, from the entrance/exit ramp at the Clearwater end.

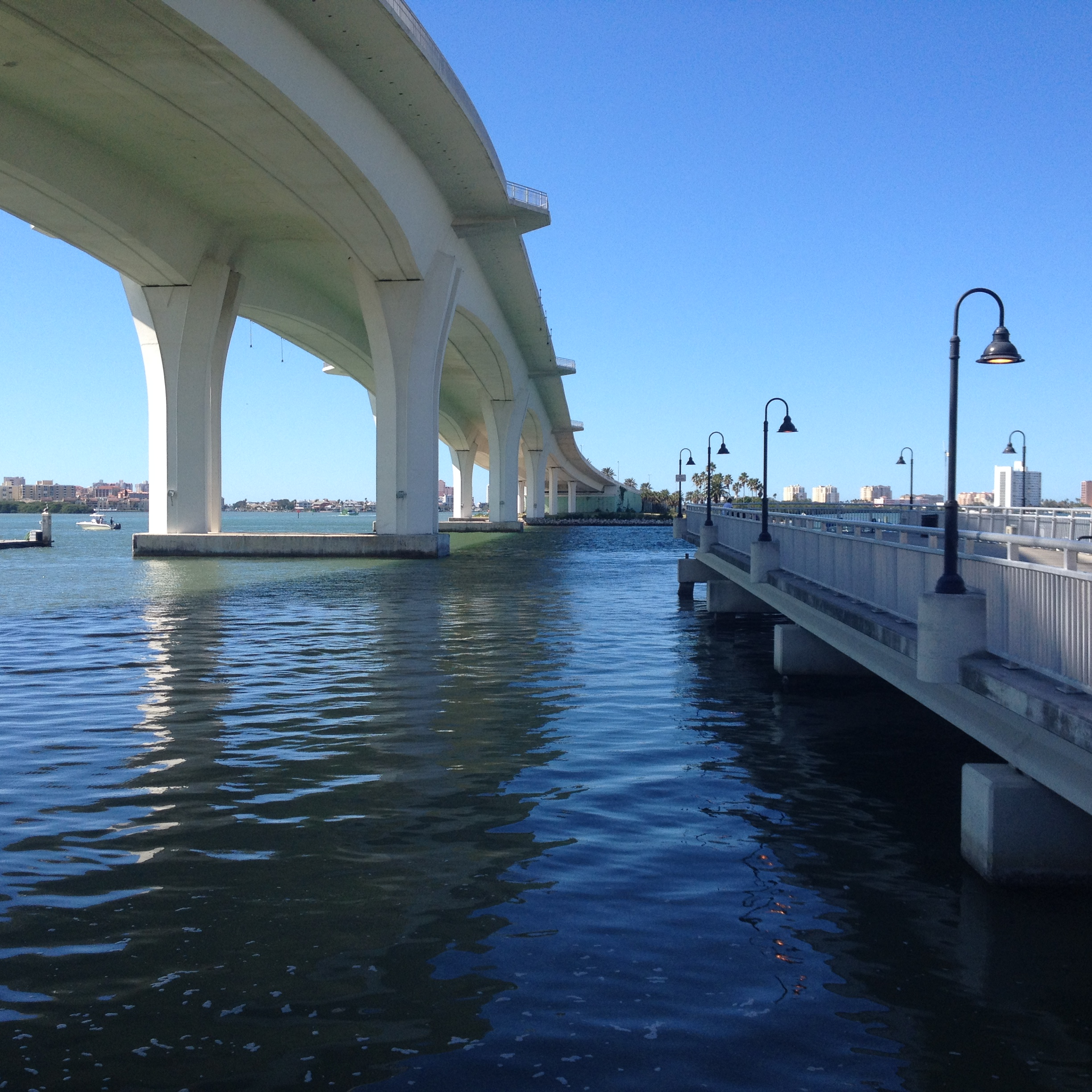
Another shot of the Causeway, from below.

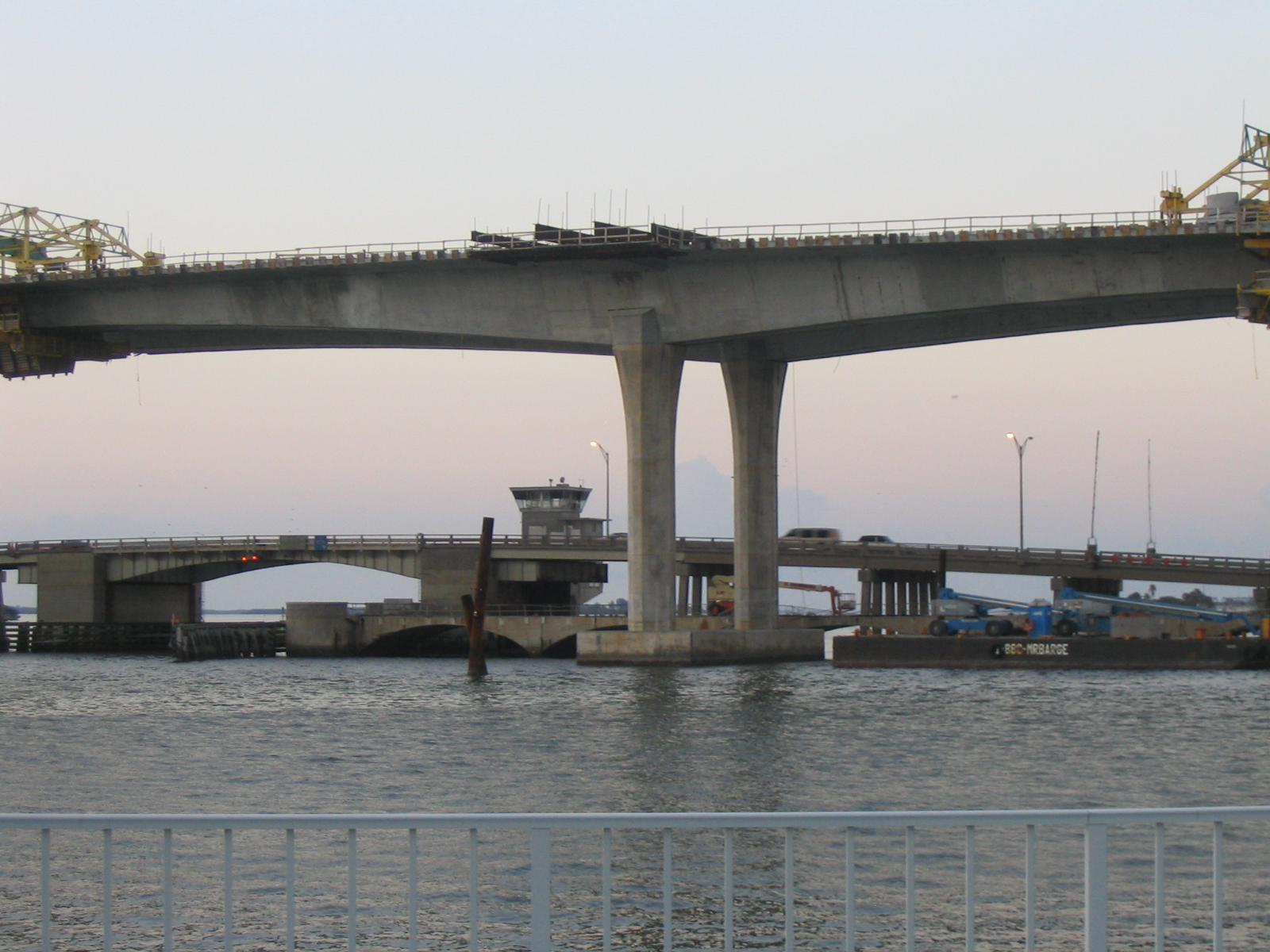
The old bridge in the background with the new bridge in the foreground.

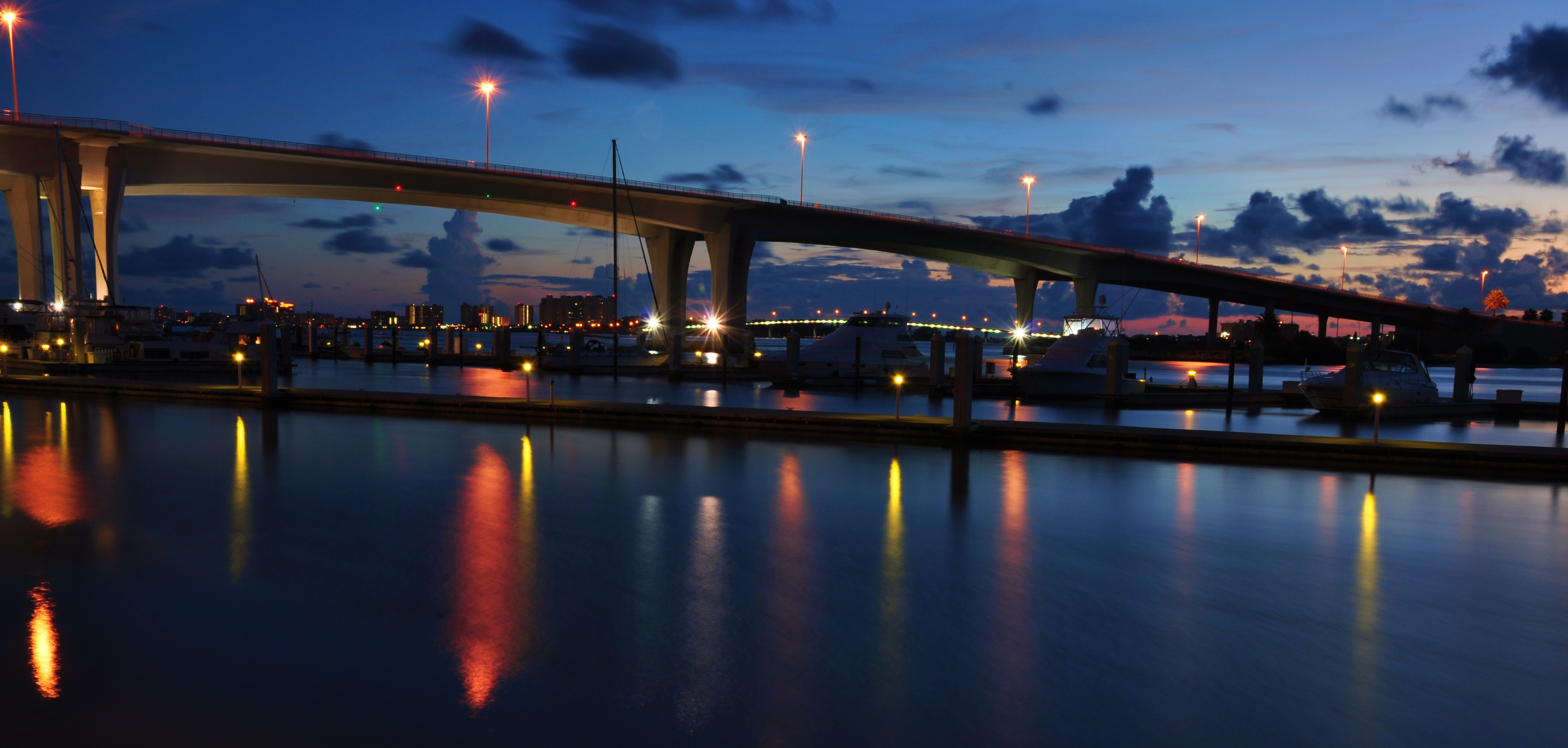
Clearwater Memorial Causeway at night

== See also ==
- Dunedin Causeway
- Sand Key Bridge
- Belleair Causeway
- Indian Rocks Causeway
- Park Boulevard Bridge
- Tom Stuart Causeway
- John's Pass Bridge
- Treasure Island Causeway
- Corey Causeway
- Pinellas Bayway
