= Dunedin Causeway =

Bridge in Florida, United States of America

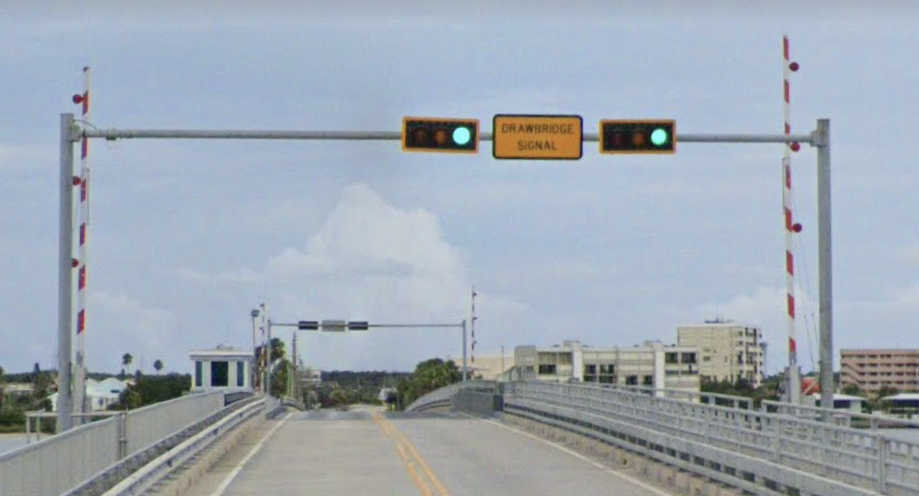
- The Dunedin Causeway bascule bridge in 2019.
- Coordinates: 28°03′03.9″N 82°47′43.5″W
- Carries: CR 586
- Crosses: St. Joseph Sound
- Locale: Dunedin, Florida
- Official name: Dunedin Causeway
- Owner: Pinellas County Public Works and Transportation

Characteristics
- Design: Bascule
- Material: Steel
- Total length: 1,190 feet
- Width: 26 feet
- Clearance above: 17 feet
- Clearance below: 23 feet

History
- Opened: 1963

Statistics
- Daily traffic: 9,300
- Toll: None

Location
- Interactive map of Dunedin Causeway

The Dunedin Causeway is a series of three bridges (the outer ones are the fixed bridges, and the middle one a double-leaf bascule bridge) that cross the St. Joseph Sound, part of the Gulf Intracoastal Waterway, connecting the barrier islands of Honeymoon Island State Park and the mainland of Dunedin, Florida. The causeway carries CR 586 and it was built in 1963.

The causeway is lined on each side by water with vistas of St. Joseph Sound and plenty of free parking along the access areas that parallel the main roadway.

== See also ==
- Clearwater Memorial Causeway
- Sand Key Bridge
- Belleair Causeway
- Indian Rocks Causeway
- Park Boulevard Bridge
- Tom Stuart Causeway
- John's Pass Bridge
- Treasure Island Causeway
- Corey Causeway
- Pinellas Bayway
