= Florida State Road 666 =

State highway in Florida, United States

State Road 666
- Tom Stuart Causeway / 150th Avenue

Route information
- Maintained by FDOT
- Length: 1.391 mi (2.239 km)

Major junctions
- West end: SR 699 in Madeira Beach
- East end: US 19 Alt. in Seminole

Location
- Country: United States
- State: Florida
- Counties: Pinellas

Highway system
- Florida State Highway System; Interstate; US; State; Former; Pre‑1945; Toll; Scenic
← SR 663	→ SR 674

State Road 666 (SR 666) is a short state road in Pinellas County. Locally known as Tom Stuart Causeway, Welch Causeway, or Madeira Beach Causeway, the route crosses Boca Ciega Bay from Seminole to Madeira Beach. The bridge crossing Boca Ciega Bay is a bascule bridge with 11 spans, built in 1962. The route ends with an interchange with U.S. Route 19 Alternate (US 19 Alt.) in Bay Pines (originally built for the formerly proposed Pinellas Belt Expressway). The southwestern terminus of the route is at State Road 699 in Madeira Beach, in front of the Ocean Sands hotel.

== Major intersections ==
The entire route is in Pinellas County.

Location	mi	km	Destinations	Notes
Madeira Beach	0.000	0.000	SR 699 (Gulf Boulevard) – Redington Beach	
Madeira Beach	0.500– 0.642	0.805– 1.033	Tom Stuart Causeway over Boca Ciega Bay (Gulf Intracoastal Waterway)	
Madeira Beach	0.887	1.427	CR 321 north (Duhme Road)	
Seminole	1.2	1.9	Exit to school (EB only)	
Seminole	1.391	2.239	US 19 Alt. (SR 595) – Seminole, Clearwater, St. Petersburg	Interchange
1.000 mi = 1.609 km; 1.000 km = 0.621 mi

== See also ==
- Dunedin Causeway
- Clearwater Memorial Causeway
- Sand Key Bridge
- Belleair Causeway
- Indian Rocks Causeway
- Park Boulevard Bridge
- John's Pass Bridge
- Treasure Island Causeway
- Corey Causeway
- Pinellas Bayway
