= Pinellas Bayway =

Highway in Florida, United States of America

State Road 679 & State Road 682
- SR 679 highlighted in red and SR 682 in blue

Route information
- Maintained by FDOT

State Road 679
- Length: 9.960 mi (16.029 km)
- South end: Fort De Soto Park
- North end: SR 682 in St. Petersburg

State Road 682
- Length: 3.721 mi (5.988 km)
- West end: SR 699 in St. Pete Beach
- East end: I-275 / US 19 in St. Petersburg

Location
- Country: United States
- State: Florida

Highway system
- Florida State Highway System; Interstate; US; State; Former; Pre‑1945; Toll; Scenic
← SR 678	→ SR 681
← SR 681	→ SR 683

The Pinellas Bayway System is a series of bridges on two state roads in Pinellas County, Florida. It is a toll road complex maintained and operated by the Florida Department of Transportation. It also is compatible with the SunPass ETC system currently in use on all other FDOT-owned toll roads. The Pinellas Bayway consists of:

- State Road 682, an east–west divided highway connecting SR 699 on a Gulf of Mexico barrier island near St. Pete Beach, Florida to Interstate 275 (SR 93) and US 19 (SR 55) in St. Petersburg. The 3.7-mile-long State Road 682 passes over three bridges (toll:$1.00) as it crosses the entrance of Boca Ciega Bay.
- State Road 679, a hook-shaped north–south road with a four-lane divided northern half (between SR 682 and Tierra Verde) and a two-lane southern half serving Fort De Soto Park at the tip of the "hook" (75 cents toll). Motorists traveling the entire length of SR 679 traverse two bridges.

The two State Roads intersect on Isla del Sol midway between St. Petersburg and St. Pete Beach. Until 2013, both highways had drawbridges in addition to low-level causeways in their configuration, and SR 679 retains this configuration. Attempts to replace the drawbridges with bridges of a different design in recent years met resistance from both nearby residents, yachtsmen, and the local chapter of the NAACP. As of 2006, studies were being conducted by FDOT as to how the bridges would be replaced and how much they would cost. The low-level causeway and bascule-type drawbridge on SR 682 were replaced in 2013–2014 by a new high-level causeway without a movable span. The low-level causeway and bascule-type drawbridge on SR 679 were replaced in 2019–2021 by a new high-level causeway without a movable span.

Both Fort DeSoto Park and the Pinellas Bayway opened on December 21, 1962. The east–west portion was then signed SR A19A, a designation it kept until the mid-1980s, when FDOT did a statewide reallocation of state route numbers. Despite the redesignation, some local businesses and residents still refer to A19A when mentioning the Bayway.

On October 14, 2000, the portion of SR 679 in Fort De Soto Park was transferred to Pinellas County.

== Tolls ==
The Pinellas Bayway system employs toll by plate and electronic toll collection. The cash booths were terminated on September 22, 2023. Casual users of the Bayway system may use their SunPass or other Florida-compatible electronic toll collection transponders such as LeeWay, E-PASS, and E-ZPass, Pike Pass, K Tag and certain Texas passes (not all are accepted).

Two discounted annual passes for Bayway Isle residents and commuters are also authorized, in conjunction with SunPass usage. The prices include the rental of transponder for the term of the annual pass.

- Bayway Isle residents may purchase a Bayway Isle annual pass for $15 annually, allowing them unlimited passage through the northeast toll plaza only. This discount was authorized at the time of the original construction of the facility. The pass is sold in June of each year and expires on July 1 the following year. Tierra Verde residents also have access to this pass.
- Commuters and other frequent users have the option of purchasing an unlimited pass for $50 annually. This commuter pass, which is good at all three plazas on the Bayway system, is renewable each September, and was authorized by legislation in 1985.

=== Withdrawn toll increase ===
On November 28, 2007, the Florida Department of Transportation held a public hearing and revealed that they planned to more than double the cash and Sunpass tolls on the Pinellas Bayway, and to eliminate the $15 Bayway resident pass. The funds from these increased tolls would be used to issue bonds for the eventual improvement of the bridges of the Bayway System.

Local public officials (including Mayor Rick Baker of St. Petersburg) spoke out loudly against what some perceive as an unfair allocation of costs to Pinellas Bayway residents. In February 2008, an ad hoc coalition of affected Homeowner Associations, the Citizens's Bayway Task Force, organized to fight the toll increase. The legislation to increase the tolls on the Pinellas Bayway was withdrawn on March 19, 2008.

== Major intersections ==
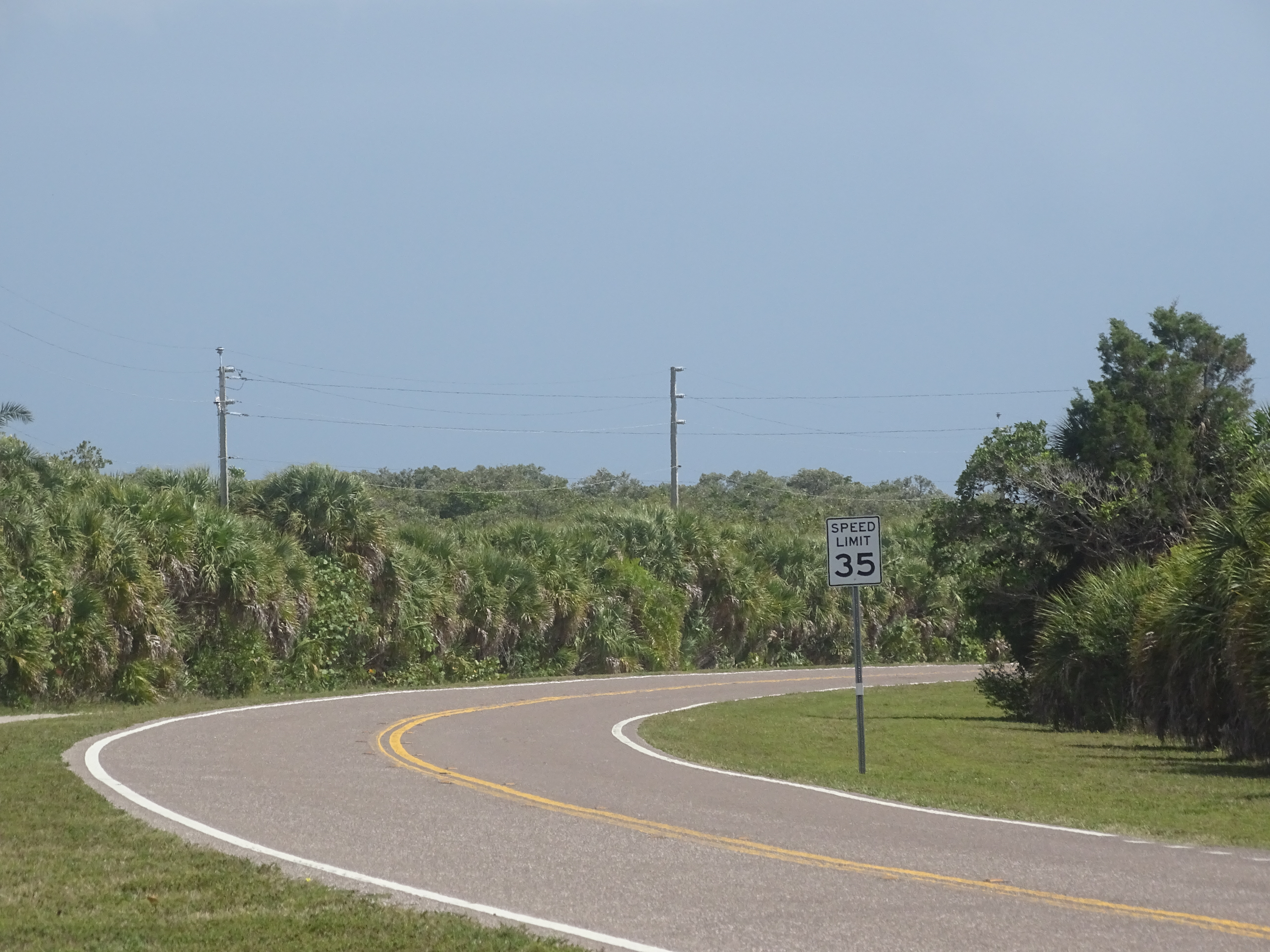
SR 679 within Fort De Soto Park

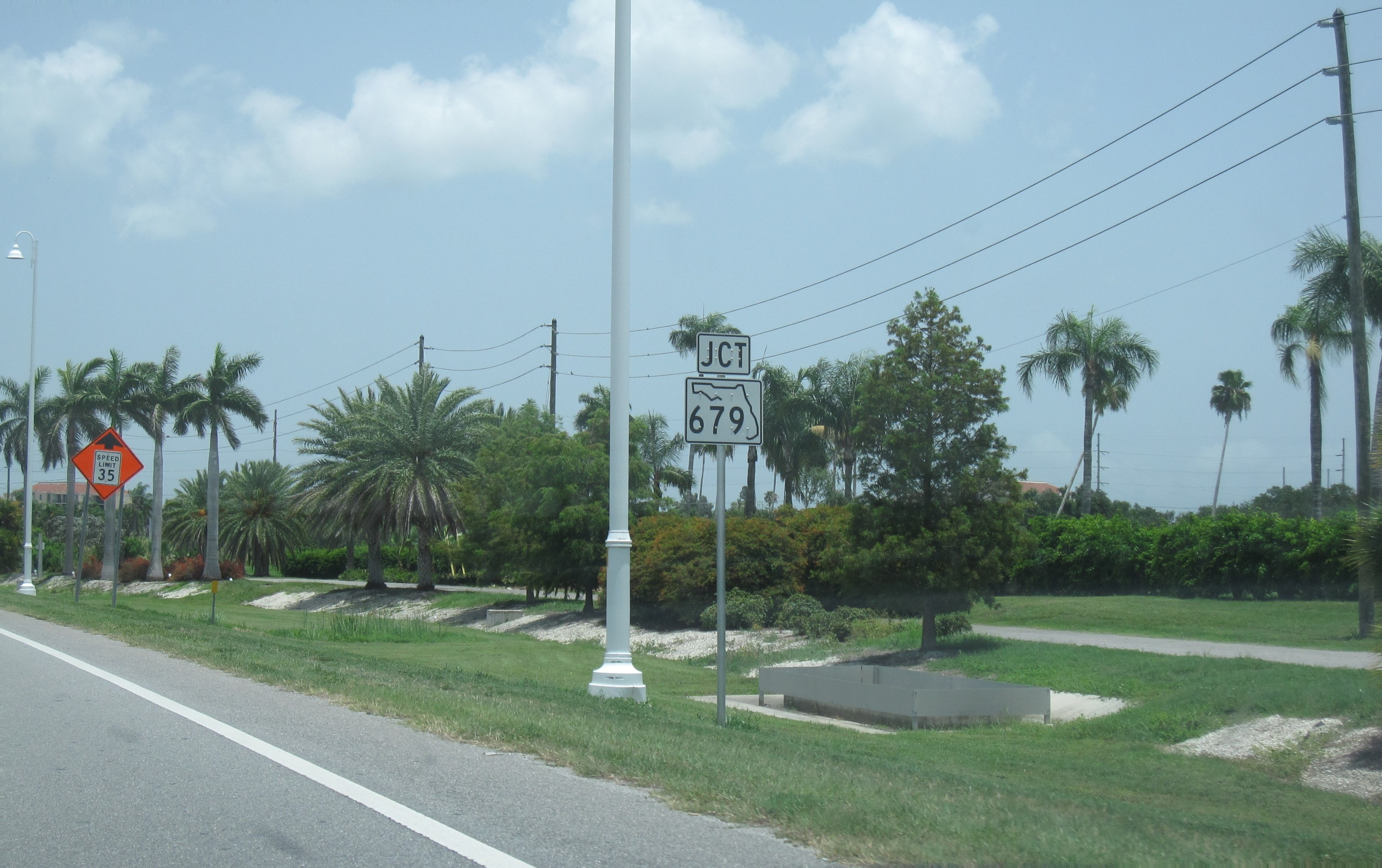
Florida State Road 679 junction sign on Pinellas Bayway

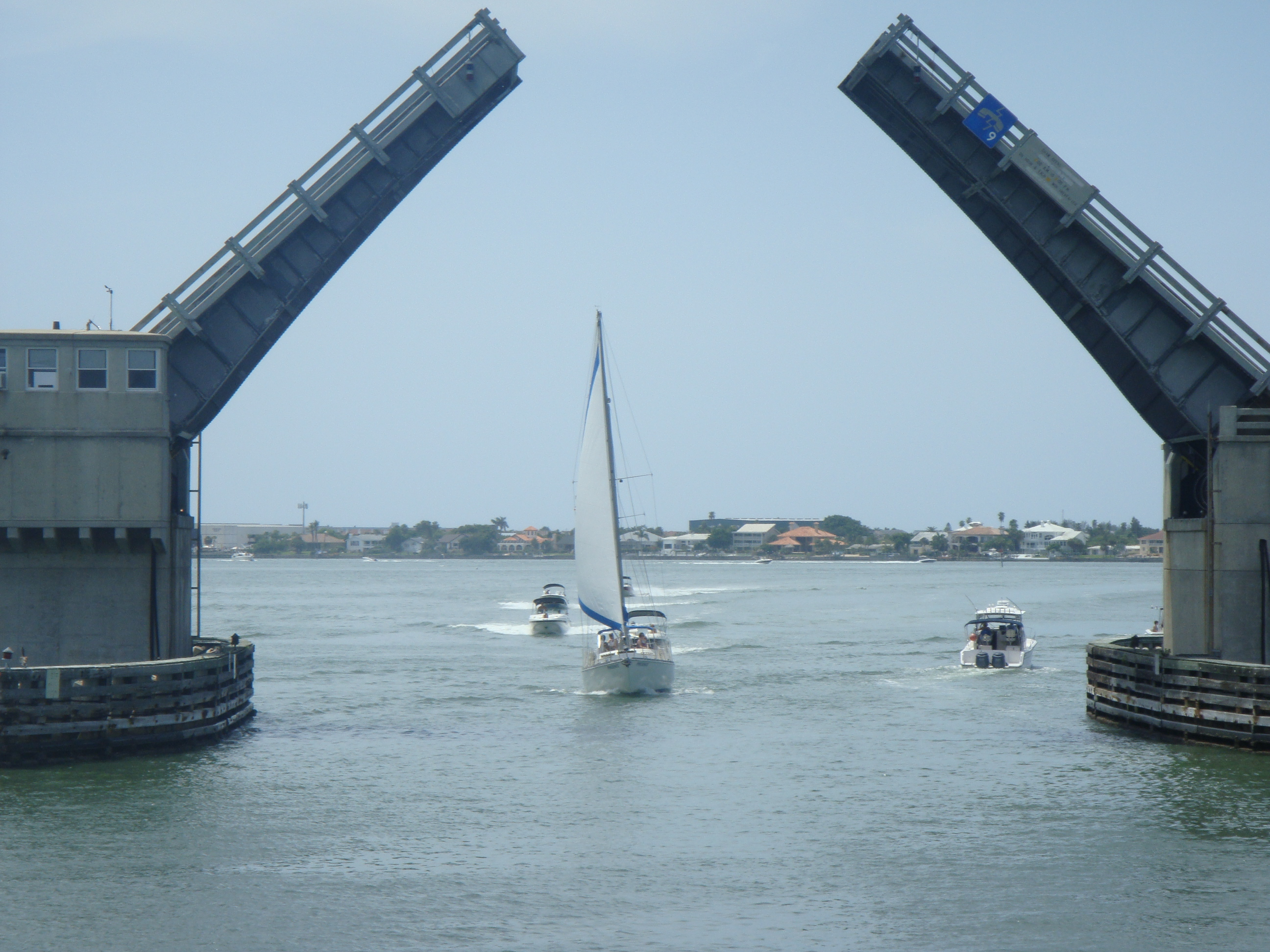
The bascule bridge on SR 682 in 2011, before it was dismantled and replaced by a high-level bridge

=== SR 679 ===
The entire route is in Pinellas County.

Location	mi	km	Destinations	Notes
Fort De Soto Park	0.000	0.000		
Fort De Soto Park	3.4	5.5	Anderson Boulevard - East Beach	
Fort De Soto Park	5.144	8.278	South end of state maintenance	
	5.144– 5.420	8.278– 8.723	Bridge over Bunces Pass (southbound toll; Pay-by-Plate or SunPass)	
	8.476– 8.739	13.641– 14.064	Tierra Verde Bridge over Boca Ciega Bay Main Channel (Gulf Intracoastal Waterway)	
St. Petersburg	9.960	16.029	SR 682 (Pinellas Bayway) to I-275 (Sunshine Skyway) – St. Pete Beach, St. Petersburg	
1.000 mi = 1.609 km; 1.000 km = 0.621 mi: Electronic toll collection

=== SR 682 ===
The entire route is in Pinellas County.

Location	mi	km	Destinations	Notes
St. Pete Beach	0.000	0.000	SR 699 north (Gulf Boulevard) – Pass-A-Grille, Treasure Island, Historic District	
	0.429– 0.906	0.690– 1.458	Delgado Memorial Bridge over Boca Ciega Bay (eastbound toll; Pay-by-Plate or SunPass)	
St. Petersburg	1.424	2.292	SR 679 south – Tierra Verde, Fort Desoto Park, Shell & Egmont Keys Ferry	
St. Petersburg	2.821	4.540	Toll Plaza (westbound only; Pay-by-Plate or SunPass)	
St. Petersburg	3.568	5.742	I-275 north (SR 93) – Tampa	I-275 exit 17
St. Petersburg	3.721	5.988	US 19 (34th Street South) / I-275 south – Bradenton	I-275 exit 17
1.000 mi = 1.609 km; 1.000 km = 0.621 mi: Electronic toll collection

== See also ==
- Dunedin Causeway
- Clearwater Memorial Causeway
- Sand Key Bridge
- Belleair Causeway
- Indian Rocks Causeway
- Park Boulevard Bridge
- Tom Stuart Causeway
- John's Pass Bridge
- Treasure Island Causeway
- Corey Causeway
