= Indian Rocks Causeway =

Bridge in Florida, United States of America

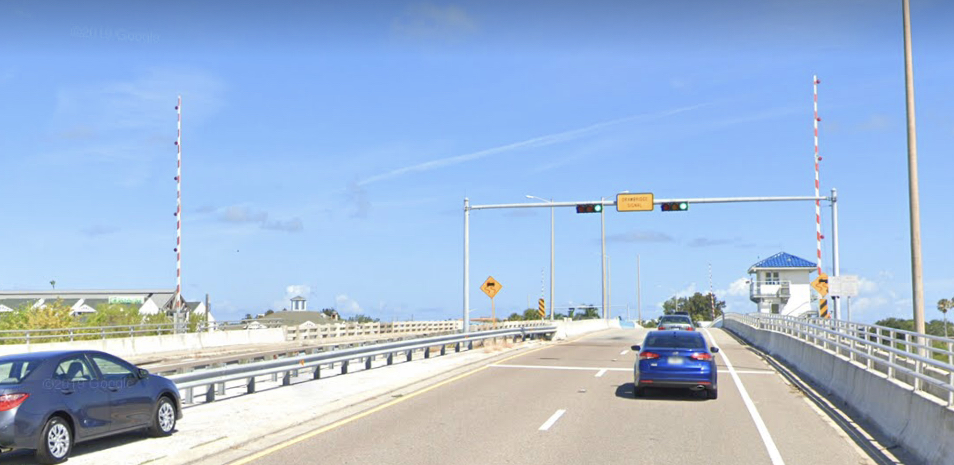
- The Indian Rocks Causeway in 2019.
- Coordinates: 27°53′00.1″N 82°50′43.6″W
- Carries: SR 688
- Crosses: The Narrows
- Locale: Indian Rocks Beach, Florida
- Official name: Indian Rocks Causeway
- Other name: Indian Rocks Bridge
- Owner: State Highway Agency

Characteristics
- Design: Bascule
- Material: Steel
- Total length: 458 feet
- Width: 35 feet
- Clearance above: 19 feet
- Clearance below: 23 feet
- No. of lanes: Four

History
- Opened: 1916 (original swing bridge); 1958 (current eastbound); 1999 (current westbound)

Statistics
- Daily traffic: 8,550
- Toll: None

Location
- Interactive map of Indian Rocks Causeway

The Indian Rocks Causeway (also called the Indian Rocks Bridge) is a twin-span double-leaf bascule bridge that crosses the Narrows, part of the Gulf Intracoastal Waterway, connecting the barrier islands of Indian Rocks Beach and the mainland of Largo, Florida. The bridge carries Walsingham Road, part of SR 688. The eastbound span of the Indian Rocks Causeway was built in 1958, replacing the original swing bridge built in 1916, and the westbound span was built in 1999.

== See also ==
- Dunedin Causeway
- Clearwater Memorial Causeway
- Sand Key Bridge
- Belleair Causeway
- Park Boulevard Bridge
- Tom Stuart Causeway
- John's Pass Bridge
- Treasure Island Causeway
- Corey Causeway
- Pinellas Bayway
