= Clam Bayou =

Estuary in Pinellas County, Florida, United States

Coordinates: 27.742°N 82.690°W

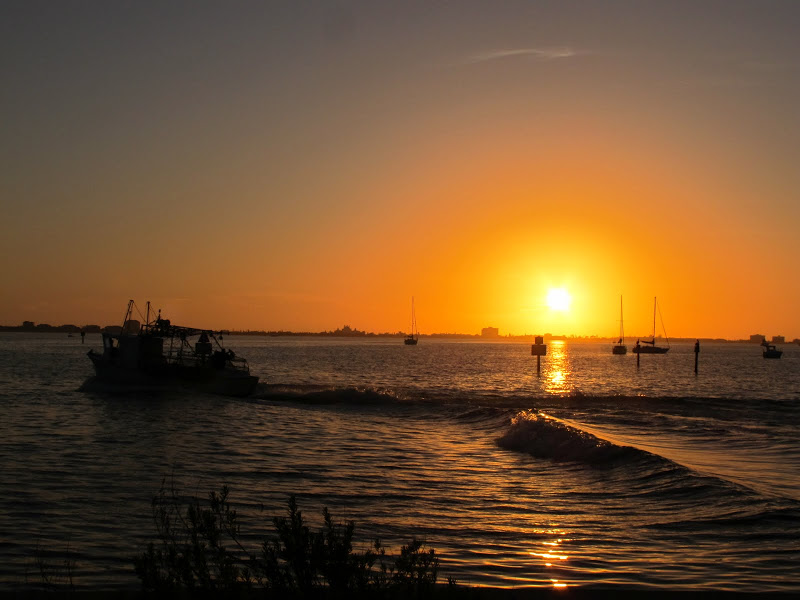
A December sunset from Clam Bayou Park looking over Boca Ciega Bay

Clam Bayou is a 170-acre estuary between Gulfport, Florida, St. Petersburg, Florida, and Boca Ciega Bay. The neighborhood around the estuary is also known as Clam Bayou. The area is popular with kayakers. It is also home to the 10-acre Clam Bayou Nature Park that includes a canoe and kayak launch point.

Trash, sediments, and pollution have become a problem as the surrounding areas were developed. Approximately 127 acres of Clam Bayou are publicly owned and a restoration project in 2010-2011 sought to improve water quality outflows to Boca Ciega Bay. The restoration project included 20 acres (8.1 ha) of ponds designed to treat stormwater runoff from the surrounding 2,600 acres (1,100 ha).

Clam Bayou Nature preserve is located at 34th Ave. S. & 40th St. S. in St. Petersburg, or south of 29th Avenue South on Miriam Street in Gulfport. It includes habitat for fiddler crabs, clams, wading birds, dolphins, and manatees. Observation decks provide a view over the brackish water estuary and there are trails.

Nearby, the city of Gulfport operates a full-service marina.
