= Florida State Road 694 =

State highway in Florida, United States

State Road 694 and County Road 694
- Park Boulevard; Gandy Boulevard
- SR 694 in red, CR 694 in blue

Route information
- Length: 6.023 mi (9.693 km) CR 694: 6.991 mi (11.251 km)

Major junctions
- West end: SR 693 in Pinellas Park
- US 19 in Pinellas Park; I-275 in St. Petersburg
- East end: US 92 / SR 687 in St. Petersburg

Location
- Country: United States
- State: Florida
- County: Pinellas

Highway system
- Florida State Highway System; Interstate; US; State; Former; Pre‑1945; Toll; Scenic
← SR 693	→ SR 699

State Road 694 (SR 694) is an east–west route in Pinellas County, running from SR 693 (66th Street N) in Pinellas Park to U.S. Route 92 (US 92 and unsigned SR 600) in St. Petersburg.

== Route description ==
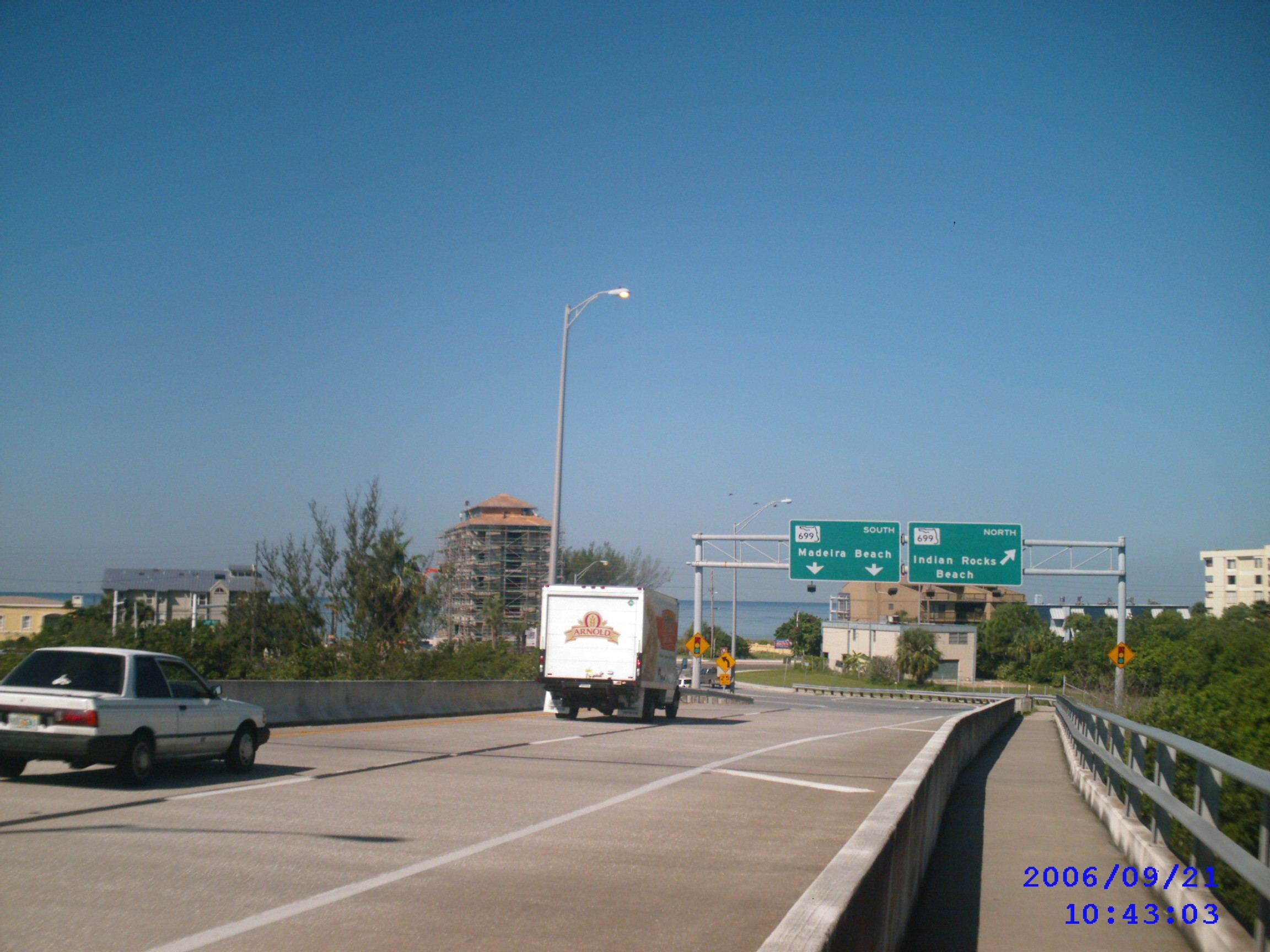
Looking west toward The Gulf of Mexico and Indian Shores, Florida from bridge over Intracoastal Waterway

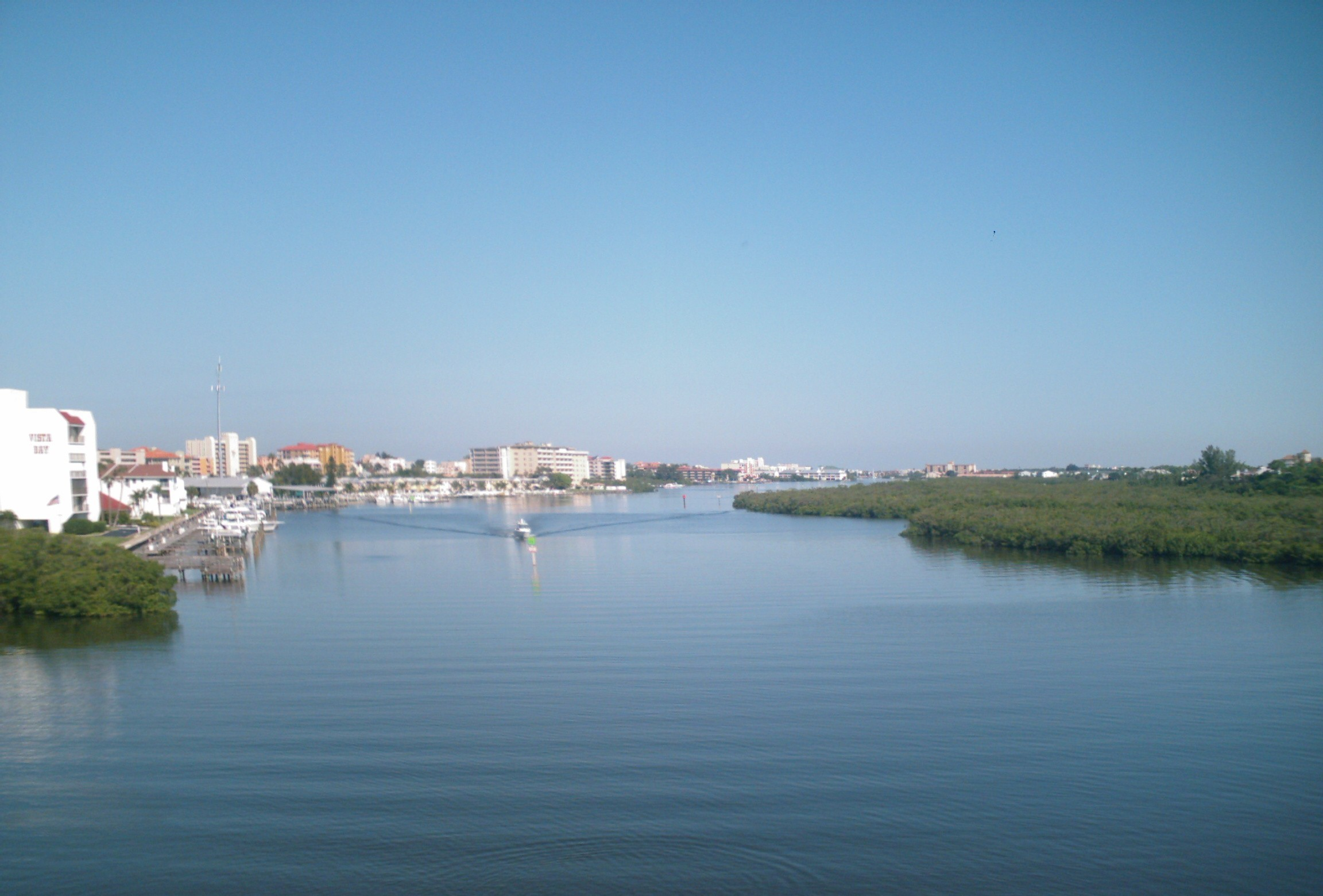
Looking north on County Road 694 from bridge over Intracoastal Waterway; Indian Shores, Florida on left, mangroves on right

State Road 694 starts at State Road 693 in Pinellas Park, where SR 694 heads east as Park Boulevard. At the intersection with US 19 in southeastern Pinellas Park, SR 694 becomes known as Gandy Boulevard and turns northeast into northeastern St. Petersburg, heading towards the interchange with Interstate 275 (I-275). It continues northeast, intersecting Dr. Martin Luther King Jr. Street N, before heading towards its eastern terminus at the intersection with 4th Street N, Roosevelt Boulevard, and US 92 (unsigned SR 600). East of SR 694's eastern terminus, Gandy Boulevard continues signed as US 92/SR 600 and crosses the Gandy Bridge into Tampa.

State Road 694 previously began at State Road 699 in Indian Shores, running through Seminole and to the SR 693 intersection in Pinellas Park. The former road to the west is now known as County Road 694 (CR 694).

== History ==
State Road 694 was originally visioned as a multilane freeway, running from SR 699 (Gulf Boulevard) east to the Gandy Bridge, known as the Gandy Freeway. However, the plan was nixed in the 1970s due to an increasing business population. The remnants of this planned freeway are the US 19 interchange in Pinellas Park, the configuration of the I-275 interchange, and the wide median between MLK Jr St N and 4th St N.

== Gandy Freeway ==
The Gandy Freeway is a limited access freeway that is located in Pinellas County, Florida. The freeway portion runs from just east of 4th Street to just west of the I-275 interchange. Construction of the freeway began in February 2014 and completed in late 2017. The project was projected to cost $83 million, and was due for completion in 2017. The Gandy Freeway east of US 19 was reconsidered due to increasing congestion and right-of-way already prepared for overpasses at 4th St N/Roosevelt Blvd and 9th St N/MLK St N.

=== Original aspirations ===
The Gandy Freeway has been in planning books for decades, with a roughly 12.6 miles (20.3 km) stretch between a proposed connection to the Lee Roy Selmon Expressway in Tampa, and US 19 (or somewhere westward). Due to the low likelihood of the Hillsborough County portion being constructed, and increasing urbanization of Pinellas Park, the freeway was ultimately shelved (with portions west of US 19 being cancelled). Remains of the original freeway can be seen in the Gandy Boulevard interchange at I-275 (which lacks several ramps that were originally planned to be built), the grade separated diamond interchange at US 19 with Gandy Boulevard as limited access, and the very wide right-of-way preserved along Gandy Boulevard east of I-275.

=== Section between I-275 and 4th Street ===
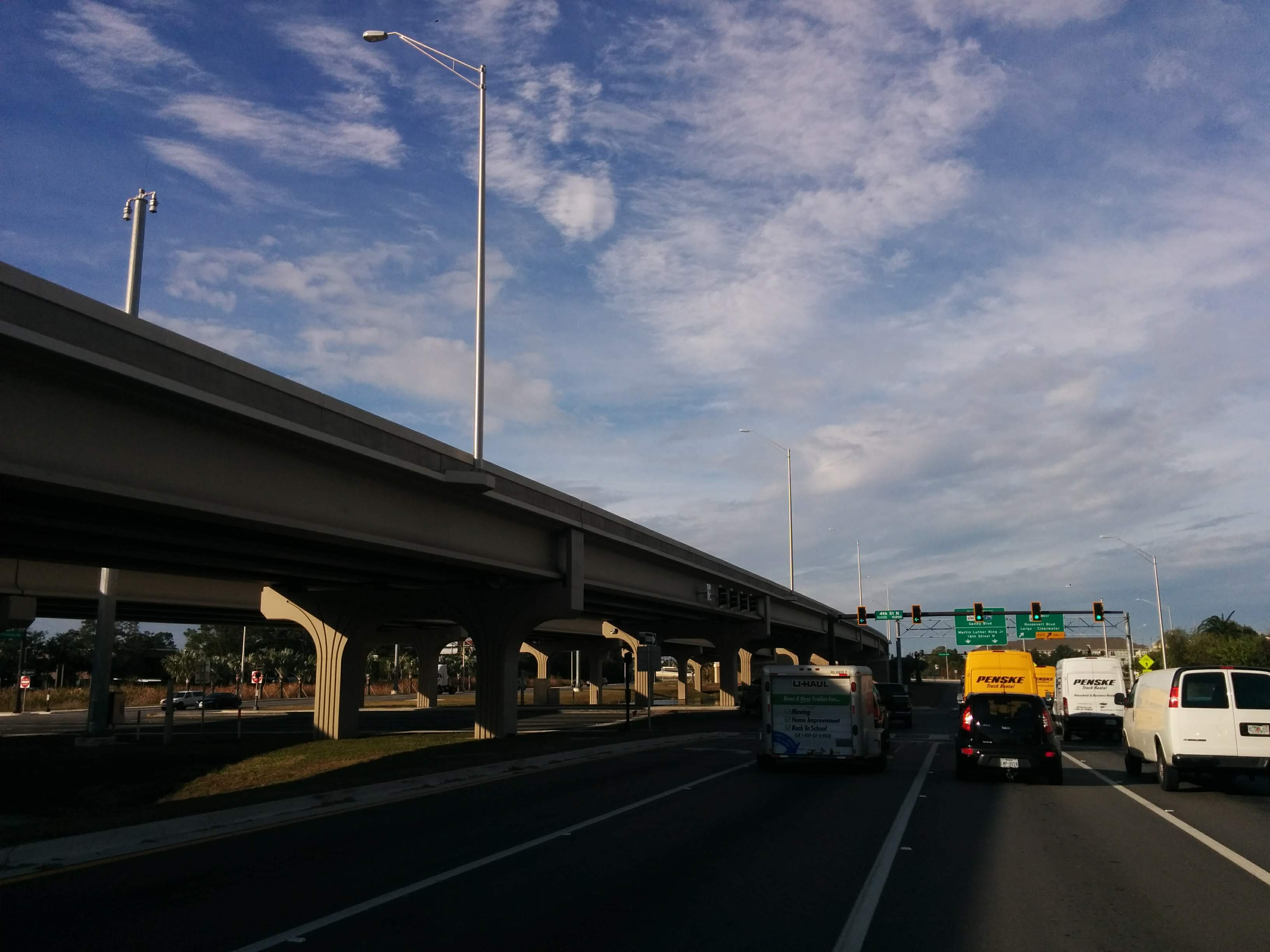
Looking at the Gandy Freeway overpasses at 4th Street N, St. Petersburg, FL

After being shelved for decades, largely due to a lack of funding, the Gandy Freeway section from just east of 4th Street N to the I-275 interchange was finally built at a cost of $83 million. This project comprised a four to six-lane elevated highway, with overpasses at 4th Street N/Roosevelt Boulevard, 9th Street N (also known as MLK Street N), and 94th Avenue N. A four lane frontage road system (two lanes in each direction) would parallel the elevated structures. In recent years, the Florida Department of Transportation has seen this particular project as an increasing priority for relieving congestion along the corridor, which is why the project was fast-tracked for construction in recent years.

On December 14, 2016, the new eastbound elevated lanes opened over 94th Avenue N, with the westbound direction opening on February 12, 2017. The new westbound elevated lanes over MLK Street N, Roosevelt Boulevard, and 4th Street N opened on June 18, 2017, with the eastbound direction opening on June 23, 2017. As of February 1, 2018, both frontage roads were completed and fully operational.

=== I-275 interchange ===
The Gandy Boulevard interchange with I-275 is technically incomplete, lacking a free-flowing flyover from northbound I-275 to westbound Gandy. Originally, the interchange was also without a ramp from eastbound Gandy to southbound I-275 (this ramp was constructed in 1981). It is currently unclear if a free-flowing ramp will be constructed from northbound I-275 to westbound Gandy and there is speculation that this component of the project has been rolled into the controversial toll lane project formerly known as Tampa Bay Express.

=== Section between US 19 and I-275 ===
Plans were also in the works to build an overpass at the intersection of Gandy Boulevard and Grand Ave, but those plans were cancelled due to community opposition.

=== January 2015 Tanker Incident ===
On Tuesday, January 6, 2015, a fuel tanker traveling westbound on Gandy Boulevard collided with a utility truck traveling southbound on Roosevelt Boulevard. Fuel from the tanker leaked and ignited, causing a huge fireball of flames to erupt. Fire crews from multiple departments; including Pinellas Park, Largo, Seminole, St. Petersburg and the St. Petersburg-Cleawater International Airport, responded to the incident, and it took well over an hour for the fire to be extinguished. Both drivers were transported to area hospitals; with the driver of the tanker truck suffering second and third-degree burns throughout most of his body. The driver of the utility truck suffered lacerations and fractures.

The severity of the incident has caused environmental concerns, as fuel seeped about four feet into the ground around and beneath the damaged roadway. Flames from the fire also charred the retaining wall that now carries westbound traffic over 4th Street and Roosevelt Boulevard. The Florida Department of Transportation evaluated the condition of the wall and determined that the affected section would need to be partially rebuilt. The work was able to be completed without significantly delaying the overall project.

== Major intersections ==
The entire route is in Pinellas County.

Location	mi	km	Destinations	Notes
Indian Shores	0.000	0.000	SR 699 (Gulf Boulevard) – Indian Rocks Beach, Madeira Beach	Western terminus
Indian Shores	0.2	0.32	Park Boulevard Bridge over The Narrows (Gulf Intracoastal Waterway)	
	0.807	1.299	CR 240 east / CR 233 north (Oakhurst Road)	
Seminole	2.8	4.5	CR 321 (113th Street North) – Walsingham County Park	
Seminole	3.4	5.5	US 19 Alt. (Seminole Boulevard / SR 595)	
Seminole	4.9	7.9	CR 1 (Starkey Road / Park Street)	
Pinellas Park	6.5	10.5	CR 501 (Belcher Road / 71st Street North)	
Pinellas Park	6.991	11.251	SR 693 (66th Street) – Clearwater, South Pasadena, St. Petersburg College	West end of state maintenance; CR 694 becomes SR 694
Pinellas Park	8.741	14.067	CR 611 (49th Street)	
Pinellas Park	9.719	15.641	US 19 (SR 55) – Clearwater, St. Petersburg	Interchange
St. Petersburg	11.25	18.11	I-275 (SR 93) – Tampa, St. Petersburg	I-275 exit 28; no access from SR 694 west to I-275 north or I-275 south to SR 694 east
St. Petersburg	12.2	19.6	94th Avenue N / 16th Street N	partial interchange; eastbound exit westbound entrance
St. Petersburg	12.450	20.036	To Dr. Martin Luther King Jr. Street North / 9th Street North (CR 803) north / I-275	
St. Petersburg	12.915	20.785	SR 686 west (Roosevelt Boulevard)	No left turn eastbound in the interchange
St. Petersburg	13.014	20.944	US 92 / SR 687 (4th Street North / Gandy Boulevard / SR 600 east) / to Selmon Expressway (SR 618) – Tampa	Interchange; Eastern terminus of SR 694; Gandy Boulevard continues onto US 92 (SR 600)
1.000 mi = 1.609 km; 1.000 km = 0.621 mi: Incomplete access; Route transition
