= Canceled expressways in Florida =

There have been plans in Florida for expressways, but some were never constructed due to financial problems, community opposition and environmental issues.

== Southeast Florida ==
In the 1970s, most proposed new expressways in South Florida were cancelled after voters chose to direct funding away from roads toward mass transit projects and the planned Miami Metrorail. Hialeah in particular was anti-expressway, as proposals for expressways near or through the city have been cancelled amid local opposition.

=== Cypress Creek Expressway ===
The Cypress Creek Expressway would have been an east-west expressway that would have run along the present-day Cypress Creek Road, serving Pompano Beach, Fort Lauderdale, North Lauderdale, and Tamarac. The Cypress Creek Expressway would have begun at State Road A1A (SR A1A) at the Fort Lauderdale–Pompano Beach border, and run along what is presently the eastern disjointed section of McNab Road. West of Old Dixie Highway, the road would have dipped south and run along present-day Cypress Creek Road (west of Florida's Turnpike it connects with the western disjointed section of McNab Road), until terminating at the proposed University–Deerfield Expressway (now the Sawgrass Expressway). There was no projected interchange with the Florida's Turnpike. It was to be four lanes for its entire length, and its total cost was slated at $22.6 million. It was never built due to funding and opposition.

=== Dolphin Expressway Airport Spur ===
The Dolphin Expressway was originally planned to be built on Northwest 20th Street, instead of its current alignment more or less paralleling Northwest 14th Street. A 1964 plan called for two options to solving the traffic problems near Miami International Airport. The first option was to convert LeJeune Road into an 8-lane freeway between the Dolphin Expressway and the Airport Expressway. The second option was to build a spur route from the Dolphin Expressway that would connect to the entrance of the airport, thus relieving LeJeune Road. The spur would branch off the tollway just east of NW 37th Avenue and run south–north on the west side of NW 37th Avenue. North of the golf course, it would cross the Tamiami Canal and head west to the airport's terminal entrance on Northwest 21st Street. As part of this canceled freeway project, a stack interchange was built at LeJeune Rd and Northwest 21st Street, which serves as the access road to the airport. It is today used between those two roads and the airport. In addition, as part of the Miami Intermodal Center, LeJeune Road between Northwest 14th Street and the interchange with Northwest 21st Street has recently been converted into a full freeway entirely using land obtained through demolishing businesses on the east side of a car rental agency's parking lot. The Miami Intermodal Center lies on the northeast corner of the LeJeune Road interchange with Northwest 21st Street, which is why the interchange has been improved to allow access to the new transportation hub.

=== Gratigny Parkway ===
Today's Gratigny Parkway is much shorter than it was originally supposed to be. Its original western terminus was planned to be at the Homestead Extension of Florida's Turnpike. The eastern terminus was supposed to be a few blocks short of Interstate 95. The portion east of Northwest 32nd Avenue was canceled by a combination of community opposition and race politics. The project was originally put off in the 1960s. By the time it was revived, what had originally been a mostly white neighborhood in the 1960s had become a mostly black neighborhood by the 1980s. Despite its appearance indicating otherwise, the Gratigny is not an outgrowth of some failed plot to extend I-75 toward I-95. When the Gratigny was originally planned, I-75 was being planned to follow a route along the Tamiami Trail through the Everglades and then along today's Dolphin Expressway, with a connection to the planned Everglades Jetport (which was canceled by the administration of Richard Nixon based on opposition from environmentalists and became the Dade-Collier Training and Transition Airport). After that, it was planned to follow today's route along Alligator Alley. The Gratigny continues to the west as I-75 and curves north at Northwest 138th Street/Hialeah Gardens Drive. MDX's last few master plans called for a potential eastbound extension to I-95 in a study that was put on permanent hold by MDX and a westbound extension, running concurrently with a section of I-75 but after the state took over the local governing board and transitioned the agency to GMX, all future projects are to be determined following future GMX Governing Board Direction.

=== Hialeah Expressway ===
The Hialeah Expressway would have been Dade County's third east-west expressway, cutting through Hialeah, the second-most populated city in Dade County. Its eastern terminus would have been Alton Road and 47th Street in Miami Beach, crossing Biscayne Bay over the planned Beach Causeway. It would then cross the proposed Interama Expressway and I-95, and parallel Northwest 71st Street before entering Hialeah city limits and curving north between LeJeune Road and East 4th Avenue and paralleling Northwest 74th Street until reaching the West Dade Expressway, now the Homestead Extension of Florida's Turnpike, for a distance of 16 miles (26 km). Despite its cancellation, Northwest 74th Street was partially converted into an expressway and was later extended west to the Turnpike extension in the 2010s.

=== Interama Expressway ===
The Interama Expressway, also known as the Midbay Causeway, was planned to be a north–south expressway in eastern Dade County as an alternative route and reliever to Biscayne Boulevard (US 1). It would have run from an interchange with I-95 and the proposed Snake Creek Expressway (originally proposed to run across SR 858), paralleled US 1 from there to an interchange with proposed South Dixie Expressway (see below) and I-95, slicing through downtown Miami along the way.

=== LeJeune-Douglas Expressway ===
The LeJeune-Douglas Expressway was to run from US-1 in Coral Gables to the Palmetto Expressway in Carol City/Miami Gardens as a reliever to traffic between the Palmetto Expressway and I-95 on a LeJeune Road–Douglas Road corridor, passing directly by Miami International Airport.

=== Rock Island Expressway ===
The Rock Island Expressway would have been a north-south freeway built on Rock Island Road having its southern terminus at the Turnpike near Northwest 44th Street in Tamarac. The north terminus was most likely either Wiles Road or the University–Deerfield Expressway (now the Sawgrass Expressway) in Coral Springs.

=== Sheridan Expressway ===
The Sheridan Expressway was planned to upgrade SR 822, locally known as Sheridan Street into an expressway. It would run from Old Dixie Highway in downtown Hollywood to the also-cancelled University–Deerfield Expressway in Cooper City (now University Drive).

=== South Dixie Expressway/I-95 Extension ===
The South Dixie Expressway would have extended I-95 south of its terminus at US-1 near downtown Miami to Florida City, using an upgraded US 1 routing. The southernmost 10 miles (16 km) of the Homestead Extension of Florida's Turnpike was part of the proposed I-95 extension.

=== University-Deerfield Expressway ===
When it was first proposed in 1969, it was planned to be the northernmost part of a chain of expressways from Deerfield Beach to Coral Gables, but the proposed Snake Creek Expressway (in Broward County) became part of the Florida's Turnpike Extension and the LeJeune–Douglas Expressway (in Dade County) failed in the 1970s as construction budgets narrowed roadbuilding capabilities. The Sawgrass Expressway's own history is intertwined with that of Interstate 75's cross-Florida extension from Tampa to South Florida being rerouted from Tamiami Trail to Alligator Alley. Four alternative corridors to the Palmetto Expressway were studied, variously proposing that the interstate parallel Hiatus Road/Red Road, Hiatus Road and Flamingo Road/Ludlam Road, or Okeechobee Road before the current alignment was chosen to bypass coastal Broward County to the southeast. Blueprints show that the route of the University-Deerfield Expressway, also called the University Parkway, and I-75's chosen route were inherently linked. Interstate 75's final western alignment invigorated the project which had acquired a new route and a new name, the Sawgrass–Deerfield Expressway, later shortened to the Sawgrass Expressway and built amid local opposition by the Coral Springs and Parkland communities.

=== University Parkway ===
The University Parkway was planned to be a northern extension of the Sawgrass Expressway, and would have snaked around the western suburbs of Boca Raton, Delray Beach, and Boynton Beach. Its path would have bordered the Loxahatchee National Wildlife Refuge, turning east and terminating at Flavor Pict Road west of Boynton Beach.

=== East-West Expressway (Palm Beach County) ===
The East-West Expressway was to run east–west, connecting downtown West Palm Beach with the western communities of Wellington, Royal Palm Beach, and The Acreage. There were two proposed corridors: the first (and most desired by county commissioners) ran between Belvedere Road and Okeechobee Boulevard, displacing several homes and churches along its path. The second proposed corridor ran north of Okeechobee Boulevard and aligned with Palm Beach Lakes Boulevard. When community opposition to the aforementioned routes escalated, county officials offered to transform Southern Boulevard into a full expressway to avoid displacing any residences. All proposed expressways were eventually scrapped. More than a decade after shelving those expressway plans, Southern Boulevard was converted into a partial west–east expressway from I-95 to SR 7.

=== Airport Expressway Western Extension ===
It has been previously proposed to extend the Airport Expressway west toward the Turnpike extension using the Northwest 36th Street corridor. However, the plan was never followed through with and it is now highly unlikely that such an extension will be built due to the heavy development of Doral. Nevertheless, the stretch of Northwest 36th Street between the Curtiss Parkway and Northwest 67th Avenue includes a four-to-three lane service road. With the proper modifications, such a freeway could be constructed using that right-of-way.

== Tampa Bay Area ==
In the 1970s, there were plans for several freeways in the Tampa Bay Area, but most were cancelled by 1982. The high cost of acquiring right of way in this densely populated area, as well as community opposition, were the key factors in canceling most of these freeways. Instead, planners decided to widen existing roads.

=== Belcher Freeway ===
The Belcher Freeway is a casualty of the high cost of acquiring the wide girth of land needed to build it. US-19 had traffic backups as far back as 1965, and the Belcher Freeway was considered in a Greiner, Inc., study that year. While public reception was positive, the freeway was cancelled in May 1978 as traffic projections without that link would have not made it cost effective or useful to construct. To compensate, US-19 was upgraded to a freeway in the area.

=== Brandon Bypass ===
The Brandon Bypass would have served as an alternative bypass route to SR 60 in Brandon. It would have connected at the eastern end of the Southern Crosstown Expressway, passing to the south of Brandon, ending at an interchange with SR 60 east of Brandon. By 1984, when city planners were ready to build the expressway, the area's population exploded, with high land prices and community opposition leading to its cancellation and instead widening SR 60 in Brandon. Most of this project was built in 2007, with the road ending at Town Center Boulevard, just short of SR 60.

=== Clearwater North Freeway ===
The Clearwater North Freeway would have connected downtown Clearwater with US-19 and points north, and it never made it to design or planning.

=== Dale Mabry Highway ===
Dale Mabry Highway was planned to be upgraded to an expressway north of the cancelled Northtown Expressway to near Lutz. The upgrades were only applied to a couple of intersections due to community oppositions on most of the road.

=== State Road 694A ===
This freeway would have run from 137th St to SR-595 and connected the proposed west–east Gandy Freeway directly with the beaches. It was cancelled by 1972, and never brought to public attention.

=== Gandy Freeway ===
The Gandy Freeway would have connected with the proposed connection to the Lee Roy Selmon Expressway in Tampa, and provided a route due west to the beaches in Pinellas County on an upgraded Gandy Boulevard. The low likelihood of the Hillsborough County portion being constructed, and of increasing urbanization of Pinellas Park led to this freeway's cancellation in 1979. Remains of this freeway can be seen in the Gandy Boulevard interchange at I-275, the separated grade diamond interchange at US 19 with Gandy Blvd as limited access, and of the very wide right-of-way preserved along Gandy Boulevard east of I-275.

=== Hillsborough Bay Causeway ===
The Hillsborough Bay Causeway would have started near MacDill Air Force Base, heading southeast, crossing Tampa Bay to the US 41 corridor in southern Hillsborough County, also doubling as a barrier against hurricanes for Tampa. It was cancelled due to lack of growth in southern Hillsborough County and the fact that the bridge would have blocked shipping.

=== Northwest Hillsborough Expressway ===
In the 1970s, an expressway crossing through northern Hillsborough County was proposed, but by the 1980s, many of these communities, especially Lutz have opposed the road going through their towns. Eventually, the project was broken into two sections, Veterans Expressway which has since been built and the Lutz Freeway, now known as the East–West Road, which continues to create controversy in local politics.

=== Pinellas Belt Expressway ===
The Pinellas Belt Expressway, or beltway, was actually budgeted in 1974 for construction in the 1979 fiscal year but intense community opposition stopped the freeway from progressing. Construction would have disrupted retail outlets along Tyrone Blvd and US-19 Alt, and right-of-way acquisition would have been too expensive because of the neighborhoods it would have traversed. The full freeway interchange at US-19 Alt and SR-666 in Bay Pines is all that remains of this Belt Expressway.

=== St. Petersburg-Clearwater Expressway ===
The St. Petersburg-Clearwater Expressway was the highest profile of all planned in the county, and would have been built as an interstate with mostly federal funds. It would have provided a route directly from downtown St. Petersburg to downtown Clearwater and would have replaced much of US-19 through Pinellas County. Land acquisition would have been easy as most of the route was railroad right-of-way. The freeway was officially cancelled on May 12, 1978, because new federal guidelines for interstates indicated that any approved route going forward would have to be 10 miles (16 km) or less in length, and be a "final link" in the interstate system as a whole, instead of a new road. Attention after that cancellation began to turn towards upgrading US 19 instead. The former railroad line is used as a bike/pedestrian trail, known as the Pinellas Trail.

=== South Hillsborough Parkway ===
Planned as early as 1972 to anticipate growth along the US 41 corridor, the road was to relieve traffic from somewhere in southern Hillsborough County north to the current I-4. However, the local swampy landscape didn't allow for much growth and I-75's presence served as a reliever in US 41's place, canceling the parkway by 1987.

=== State Road 60 Freeway Upgrade ===
SR-60 is a busy, retail-loaded west–east route in Clearwater. Legions of tourists from the north and east use it as their primary route to Clearwater Beach and due to its high traffic, it was proposed to be upgraded to a freeway. Local merchants and residents were against this upgrade, and instead SR 60 instead was widened, and an arterial bypass of downtown Clearwater was constructed. The freeway was dropped from records in May 1975.

=== Sunset Point Freeway ===
The Sunset Point Freeway was never seriously considered, with the upgrading of SR-60 to a freeway being favored at the time, although traffic studies in the early 1970s indicated that Drew Street, a major west–east road in downtown Clearwater, would need a reliever freeway route by 1990. The Sunset Point freeway never made it to the design or planning stage.

=== Tampa Bay Crosstown Expressway System ===
This was a system of expressways proposed to span the entire Tampa Bay area, but most of it was eventually cancelled. The Lee Roy Selmon Expressway is the successor of the South Crosstown Expressway.

=== Ulmerton Expressway ===
The Ulmerton Expressway would have upgraded Ulmerton Road from I-275 westward to an expressway, and was to have provided an important link for west–east traffic through Largo. Land acquisition would have been extremely expensive, erasing the practicality of building the freeway and it was cancelled by 1976. All that remains of this freeway plan is Ulmerton Road's very wide right-of-way, preserved by the state for the freeway when Ulmerton Road was expanded in the early 1970s. Long-term widening of Ulmerton Road using the extended right-of-way to expand from 4 lanes to 6 lanes was recently completed in 2009.

== Other proposals ==
=== Palmer Expressway ===
In St. Lucie County, the Palmer Expressway, a Turnpike project, would have extended approximately 6.2 miles (10.0 km) from County Road 709 (Glades Cut-Off Road) east to U.S. Route 1; two other alternatives each shortened the expressway by moving the western end further east. It would have run along the northern edge of Port St. Lucie, intersecting U.S. Route 1 just south of Saeger Avenue. Interchanges were planned with, from east to west, U.S. 1, St. James Drive, Florida's Turnpike, East Torino Parkway, I-95, and Glades Cut-off Road. Tollbooth were to be located on either the east- or westbound entrance/exit ramps, with a mainline plaza at the Turnpike interchange. The expressway's route ran directly north of and parallel with the power lines coming from the St. Lucie Nuclear Power Plant on Hutchinson Island. Instead, Crosstown Parkway, linking Interstate 95 with U.S. Route 1 along the former Juliet Avenue/West Virginia Avenue corridor, was built to serve much the same purpose, although in a limited capacity. The parkway also has the distinction of Florida's first superstreet intersection with Floresta Drive.

=== Northern Extension of Florida's Turnpike ===
The Northern Extension of Florida's Turnpike was proposed to continue the Turnpike northwest for 49.0 miles (78.9 km) to U.S. Route 19 at Lebanon Station. Later proposals have routed it farther south to avoid the Goethe State Forest.

In Tallahassee, it was proposed in the 1970s for interstate highway funding to be used to create an east–west expressway. The proposed route included an abandoned railroad corridor running southeast from Tennessee Street and Ocala Road to Stadium Drive, then east through the Gaines Street corridor. Another version of the plan routed along Jackson Bluff Road. There was no strong local support for construction of this expressway, and the plan was abandoned. In 1986 Tallahassee prided itself on being the largest city in the United States with no expressway within the city limits, although due to annexation of land north of I-10 this is no longer true.

=== Red Hills Coastal Parkway ===
The Red Hills Coastal Parkway was a proposed $500 million toll road in the Florida Panhandle that would have provided an eastern bypass of Tallahassee from US 98 in eastern Wakulla County to US 319 in northern Leon County. In June 2007, the Capital Region Transportation Planning Agency, the local metropolitan planning organization, voted unanimously to remove it from their project list, effectively killing the road.

The Red Hills Coastal Parkway was planned in 2005 by the Capital Region Transportation Planning Agency as part of the CRPTA's 2030 Plan as a hurricane evacuation route as well as an eastern bypass of Tallahassee. The Red Hills Coastal Parkway would have been a four-lane toll road linking US 98, near St. Marks, Florida, with Interstate 10 in Leon County, by cutting through rural Wakulla County and rural and suburban portions of eastern Leon County, eventually connecting with US 319 (Thomasville Road), north of Lawton Chiles High School in Bradfordville and within the Red Hills Region.

Opposition to the proposed toll road was put forth by residents of the Red Hills with the support of scientific evidence by Tall Timbers Research Station and Land Conservancy, The Florida Wildlife Federation, and 1000 Friends of Florida. The United States Fish and Wildlife Service, the United States Department of Transportation, and the Northwest Florida Water Management District said the need for such a project had not been established.

In March 2007, a public meeting of the CRTPA was held and federal agency's review identified numerous problems including potentially adverse impacts to the Wakulla River and St. Marks River, groundwater, springs, sinkholes, wetlands, forests, and wildlife. Other problems arose such as the proximity to the unincorporated area of Chaires, Florida and urban sprawl in rural Wakulla and Leon Counties.

== See also ==
- Transportation in Florida
