= Park Boulevard Bridge =

Bridge in Florida, United States of America

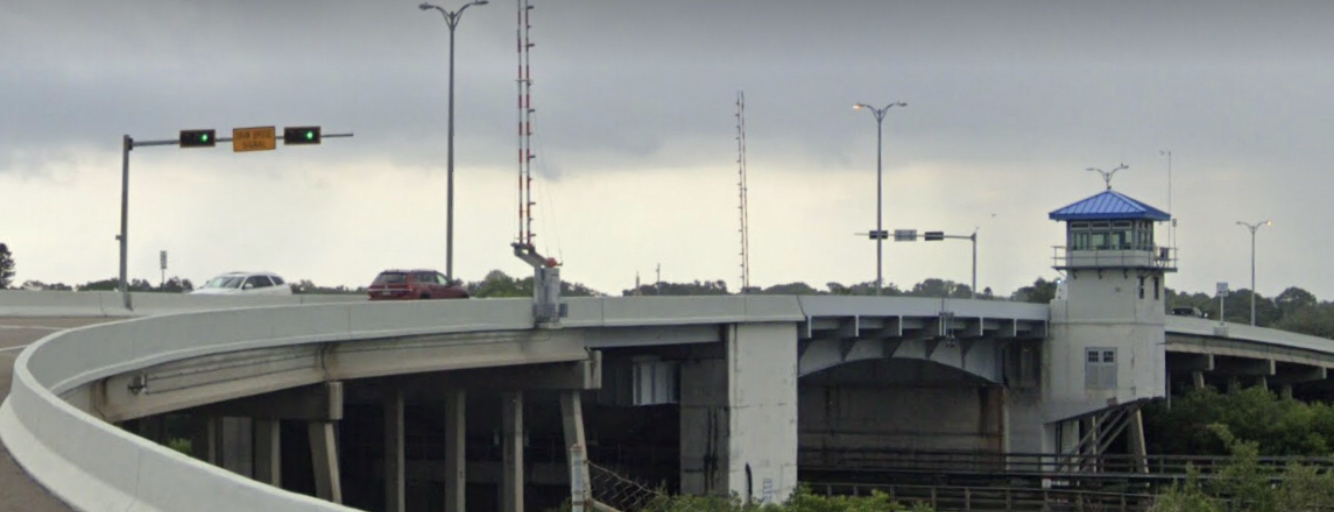
- The Park Boulevard Bridge in 2019.
- Coordinates: 27°50′38.1″N 82°50′17.5″W
- Carries: CR 694
- Crosses: The Narrows
- Locale: Indian Shores, Florida
- Official name: Park Boulevard Bridge
- Owner: County Highway Agency

Characteristics
- Design: Bascule
- Total length: 1,691 feet
- Clearance above: 17.4 feet
- Clearance below: 19.7 feet
- No. of lanes: Four

History
- Opened: 1981

Statistics
- Daily traffic: 14,800
- Toll: $0.30 until 1991

Location
- Interactive map of Park Boulevard Bridge

The Park Boulevard Bridge (originally called 78th Avenue Bridge) is a double-leaf bascule bridge that crosses the Narrows, part of the Gulf Intracoastal Waterway, connecting the barrier islands of Indian Shores and the mainland of Seminole, Florida. The bridge carries Park Boulevard, part of CR 694. The bridge was built in 1981. It had a toll, but ten years later, the tolls were removed .

== See also ==
- Dunedin Causeway
- Clearwater Memorial Causeway
- Sand Key Bridge
- Belleair Causeway
- Indian Rocks Causeway
- Tom Stuart Causeway
- John's Pass Bridge
- Treasure Island Causeway
- Corey Causeway
- Pinellas Bayway
