= Treasure Island Causeway =

Bridge in Florida, United States of America

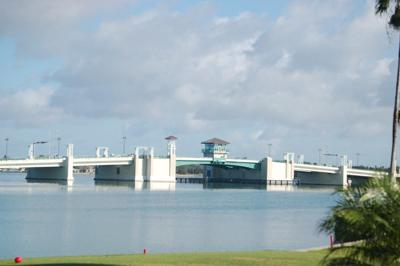
- The bascule bridge located in the middle of the causeway
- Coordinates: 27°46′N 82°45′W
- Carries: CR 150
- Crosses: Boca Ciega Bay
- Locale: Treasure Island, Florida
- Owner: City or Municipal Highway Agency

Characteristics
- Design: Bascule
- Material: Steel
- Total length: 1,014 feet
- Width: 79 feet
- Clearance above: 18 feet

History
- Opened: 1939 (original causeway & bridges); 2004-2007 (current bridges)

Statistics
- Toll: $1 until 2006

Location
- Interactive map of Treasure Island Causeway

Treasure Island Causeway is a series of three bridges (the outer ones fixed, the middle one a bascule drawbridge) crossing Boca Ciega Bay between Treasure Island and St. Petersburg in Pinellas County, Florida. The bridge, which carries County Road 150 (CR 150), is owned and maintained by the City of Treasure Island, which used to charge all motorists $1.00 toll, until 2006, when the first span of the bridge was reopened with no toll booth. Residents of two St. Petersburg waterfront communities (Causeway Isles and Yacht Club Estates) used to pay a $10 annual road tax to the City of Treasure Island to help support road and median maintenance. That tax was eliminated in the spring of 2007. Treasure Island's ownership of the causeway in St. Petersburg was part of a land agreement entered into when these two cities were born: St. Petersburg's founding fathers purchased the Municipal Beach on the shores of the neighboring Gulf of Mexico community, Treasure Island, outside its own city limits to ensure that residents would have direct access to the Gulf of Mexico for generations to come. The western terminus is an intersection with Gulf of Mexico Boulevard (SR 699) in Treasure Island.

In 1939, Treasure Island Causeway was first opened to traffic. It quickly became a popular route to the Pinellas County barrier islands for beach getaways. In 2002, an engineering study revealed that all three bridges have become structurally deficient; construction on the West and East bridge started in late 2003 and was completed in October 2004. Three months later, construction of the new drawbridge began.

On January 3, 2006, the drawbridge closed for several months due to a bridge replacement project. One half (leaf) of the drawbridge reopened to vehicular traffic on June 10, 2006. Construction was completed and the new Treasure Island Causeway was dedicated in ceremonies held on August 25, 2007.

== See also ==
- Dunedin Causeway
- Clearwater Memorial Causeway
- Sand Key Bridge
- Belleair Causeway
- Indian Rocks Causeway
- Park Boulevard Bridge
- Tom Stuart Causeway
- John's Pass Bridge
- Corey Causeway
- Pinellas Bayway
