= Kenneth City, Florida =

Town in the state of Florida, United States

- Town
- Town of Kenneth City
- Logo
- Motto(s): A Safe, Friendly Small Town
- Location in Pinellas County and the state of Florida
- Coordinates: 27°48′56″N 82°42′59″W
- Country: United States
- State: Florida
- County: Pinellas
- Incorporated: April 30, 1957

Government
  - Type: Council–Manager

Area
  - Total: 0.75 sq mi (1.93 km^{2})
  - Land: 0.71 sq mi (1.85 km^{2})
  - Water: 0.035 sq mi (0.09 km^{2})
- Elevation: 20 ft (6.1 m)

Population (2020)
  - Total: 5,047
  - Density: 7,068.6/sq mi (2,729.19/km^{2})
- Time zone: UTC-5 (Eastern (EST))
  - Summer (DST): UTC-4 (EDT)
- ZIP code: 33709
- Area code: 727
- FIPS code: 12-36175
- GNIS feature ID: 2405937
- Website: www.kennethcityfl.org

Kenneth City is a town in southern Pinellas County, Florida, between St. Petersburg and Pinellas Park, United States. It is part of the Tampa–St. Petersburg–Clearwater Metropolitan statistical area (MSA), much more commonly known as the Tampa Bay area. The population was 5,047 at the 2020 US census.

== History ==
Kenneth City was founded in 1957 by Sidney Colen, a local developer, who named the town after his son Kenneth D. Colen. Following the passage of a 2013 charter modification from a strong mayor to a council-manager form of government, the town hired its first manager since becoming incorporated in 1957. Following the March 2014 recruitment of a town manager, the town underwent reorganization intending to bolster its identity and gain recognition among the 23 other municipalities in Pinellas County.

== Geography ==
According to the United States Census Bureau, the town has a total area of 0.7 square miles (1.8 km^{2}), all land.

=== Climate ===
Kenneth City has a humid subtropical climate zone (Cfa).

== Demographics ==
Historical population
Census	Pop.	Note	%±
1960	2,114		—
1970	3,862		82.7%
1980	4,344		12.5%
1990	4,462		2.7%
2000	4,400		−1.4%
2010	4,980		13.2%
2020	5,047		1.3%
U.S. Decennial Census

=== Racial and ethnic composition ===
Kenneth City racial composition (Hispanics excluded from racial categories) (NH = Non-Hispanic)
Race	Pop 2010	Pop 2020	% 2010	% 2020
White (NH)	3,638	3,445	73.05%	68.26%
Black or African American (NH)	290	323	5.82%	6.40%
Native American or Alaska Native (NH)	8	3	0.16%	0.06%
Asian (NH)	309	372	6.20%	7.37%
Pacific Islander or Native Hawaiian (NH)	21	1	0.42%	0.02%
Some other race (NH)	16	24	0.32%	0.48%
Two or more races/Multiracial (NH)	85	224	1.71%	4.44%
Hispanic or Latino (any race)	613	655	12.31%	12.98%
Total	4,980	5,047		

=== 2020 census ===
As of the 2020 census, Kenneth City had a population of 5,047. The median age was 52.4 years. 15.5% of residents were under the age of 18 and 30.4% of residents were 65 years of age or older. For every 100 females there were 84.6 males, and for every 100 females age 18 and over there were 82.5 males age 18 and over.

100.0% of residents lived in urban areas, while 0.0% lived in rural areas.

There were 2,122 households in Kenneth City, of which 23.2% had children under the age of 18 living in them. Of all households, 35.3% were married-couple households, 19.7% were households with a male householder and no spouse or partner present, and 35.7% were households with a female householder and no spouse or partner present. About 36.0% of all households were made up of individuals and 19.7% had someone living alone who was 65 years of age or older.

There were 2,343 housing units, of which 9.4% were vacant. The homeowner vacancy rate was 1.5% and the rental vacancy rate was 8.1%.

=== 2010 census ===
As of the 2010 United States census, there were 4,980 people, 1,991 households, and 1,141 families residing in the town.

=== Demographic estimates ===
According to the Census Bureau's 2020 ACS 5-year estimates, there were 1,078 families residing in the town.

=== 2000 census ===
As of the 2000 US Census, there were 4,400 people, 1,952 households, and 1,169 families residing in the town. The population density was 6,155.2 inhabitants per square mile (2,376.5/km^{2}). There were 2,175 housing units at an average density of 3,042.6 per square mile (1,174.8/km^{2}). The racial makeup of the town was 88.05% White, 3.34% African American, 0.18% Native American, 4.84% Asian, 1.91% from other races, and 1.68% from two or more races. Hispanic or Latino of any race were 5.66% of the population.

In 2000, there were 1,952 households, out of which 22.7% had children under the age of 18 living with them, 42.8% were married couples living together, 13.5% had a female householder with no husband present, and 40.1% were non-families. 34.0% of all households were made up of individuals, and 20.8% had someone living alone who was 65 years of age or older. The average household size was 2.14 and the average family size was 2.72.

In 2000, in the town, the population was spread out, with 18.6% under the age of 18, 5.5% from 18 to 24, 25.1% from 25 to 44, 22.3% from 45 to 64, and 28.5% who were 65 years of age or older. The median age was 46 years. For every 100 females, there were 78.9 males. For every 100 females age 18 and over, there were 74.4 males.

In 2000, the median income for a household in the town was $33,962, and the median income for a family was $42,161. Males had a median income of $30,986 versus $26,960 for females. The per capita income for the town was $19,498. About 7.7% of families and 9.4% of the population were below the poverty line, including 16.1% of those under age 18 and 8.0% of those age 65 or over.
