= South Pasadena, Florida =

- City
- City of South Pasadena
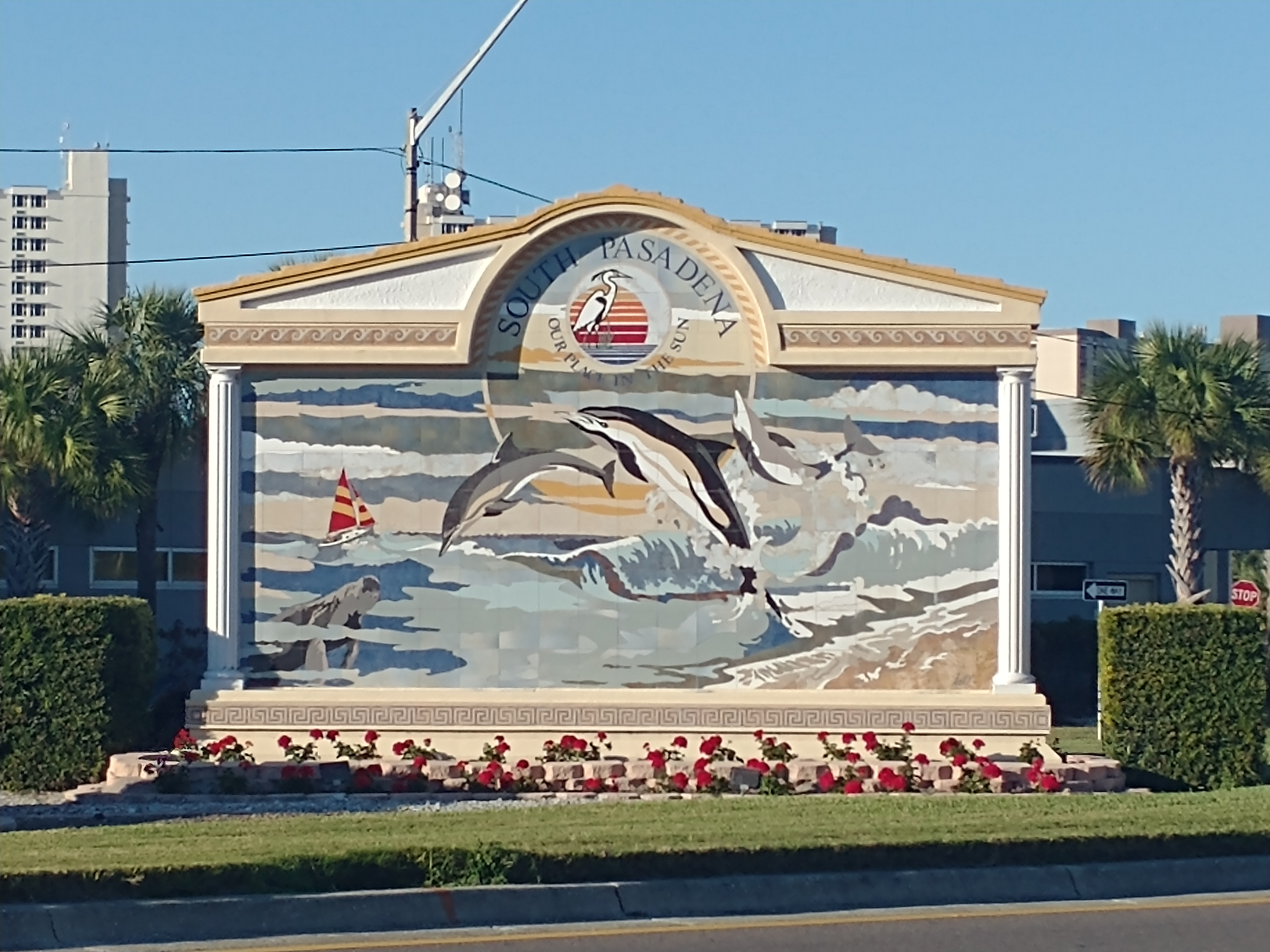
- The welcome sign bearing the seal and motto of South Pasadena, Florida.

- Seal
- Motto: Our Place in the Sun
- Location in Pinellas County and the state of Florida
- Coordinates: 27°44′58″N 82°44′46″W
- Country: United States
- State: Florida
- County: Pinellas
- Incorporated: July 1, 1955

Government
  - Type: Mayor–Commission

Area
  - Total: 1.19 sq mi (3.09 km^{2})
  - Land: 0.61 sq mi (1.58 km^{2})
  - Water: 0.58 sq mi (1.51 km^{2})
- Elevation: 7 ft (2.1 m)

Population (2020)
  - Total: 5,353
  - Density: 8,774.1/sq mi (3,387.69/km^{2})
- Time zone: UTC-5 (Eastern (EST))
  - Summer (DST): UTC-4 (EDT)
- ZIP code: 33707
- Area code: 727
- FIPS code: 12-67675
- GNIS feature ID: 2405493
- Website: mysouthpasadena.com

South Pasadena is a city in southern Pinellas County, Florida, United States, near St. Pete Beach and Gulfport. The city is part of the Tampa–St. Petersburg–Clearwater metropolitan statistical area. The population was 5,353 at the 2020 census.

== Geography ==
The city is located on a peninsula jutting into Boca Ciega Bay, bordered by Bear Creek to the east and St. Petersburg's Pasadena neighborhood to the north. The city also includes several islands; these include Pasadena Isle, Deadman's Key, Sun Island, and Cat Island. All are inhabited except for Cat Island.

According to the United States Census Bureau, the city has a total area of 1.1 square miles (3.0 km^{2}), of which 0.7 square mile (1.8 km^{2}) is land and 0.5 square mile (1.2 km^{2}) (40.87%) is water.

=== Climate ===
The City of South Pasadena has a humid subtropical climate (Cfa).

== Demographics ==
Historical population
Census	Pop.	Note	%±
1950	23		—
1960	651		2,730.4%
1970	2,465		278.6%
1980	4,188		69.9%
1990	5,644		34.8%
2000	5,778		2.4%
2010	4,964		−14.1%
2020	5,353		7.8%
U.S. Decennial Census

=== Racial and ethnic composition ===
South Pasadena racial composition (Hispanics excluded from racial categories) (NH = Non-Hispanic)
Race	Pop 2010	Pop 2020	% 2010	% 2020
White (NH)	4,625	4,788	93.17%	89.45%
Black or African American (NH)	89	132	1.79%	2.47%
Native American or Alaska Native (NH)	6	5	0.12%	0.09%
Asian (NH)	53	51	1.07%	0.95%
Pacific Islander or Native Hawaiian (NH)	2	5	0.04%	0.09%
Some other race (NH)	8	22	0.16%	0.41%
Two or more races/Multiracial (NH)	24	102	0.48%	1.91%
Hispanic or Latino (any race)	157	248	3.16%	4.63%
Total	4,964	5,353		

=== 2020 census ===
As of the 2020 census, South Pasadena had a population of 5,353. The median age was 69.1 years. 3.5% of residents were under the age of 18 and 60.5% of residents were 65 years of age or older. For every 100 females there were 74.9 males, and for every 100 females age 18 and over there were 73.6 males age 18 and over.

100.0% of residents lived in urban areas, while 0.0% lived in rural areas.

There were 3,518 households in South Pasadena, of which 4.3% had children under the age of 18 living in them. Of all households, 26.2% were married-couple households, 24.4% were households with a male householder and no spouse or partner present, and 44.7% were households with a female householder and no spouse or partner present. About 60.7% of all households were made up of individuals and 44.0% had someone living alone who was 65 years of age or older.

There were 4,477 housing units, of which 21.4% were vacant. The homeowner vacancy rate was 3.2% and the rental vacancy rate was 11.4%.

=== Income and poverty ===
In 2020, the median household income was $43,383, and the per capita income was $38,954. About 12% of the population were below the poverty line.

As of 2020, South Pasadena had the densest city in Pinellas County and the Tampa Bay area, due to its preponderance of large apartment buildings.

=== 2010 census ===
As of the 2010 United States census, there were 4,964 people, 3,304 households, and 1,047 families residing in the city.

=== 2000 census ===
As of the census of 2000, there were 5,778 people, 3,660 households, and 1,423 families residing in the city. The population density was 3,280.7 people/km^{2} (8,497 people/mi^{2}). There were 4,555 housing units at an average density of 2,586.3 units/km^{2} (6,698 units/mi^{2}). The racial makeup of the city was 98.37% White, 0.21% African American, 0.03% Native American, 0.73% Asian, 0.02% Pacific Islander, 0.21% from other races, and 0.43% from two or more races. Hispanic or Latino of any race were 1.54% of the population.

In 2000, there were 3,660 households out of which 2.7% had children under the age of 18 living with them, 34.2% were married couples living together, 3.9% had a female householder with no husband present, and 61.1% were non-families. 56.6% of all households were made up of individuals and 42.3% had someone living alone who was 65 years of age or older. The average household size was 1.50 and the average family size was 2.16.

In 2000, in the city the population was spread out with 2.9% under the age of 18, 1.5% from 18 to 24, 9.7% from 25 to 44, 22.8% from 45 to 64, and 63.1% who were 65 years of age or older. The median age was 71 years. For every 100 females there were 63.9 males. For every 100 females age 18 and over, there were 62.6 males.

In 2000, the median income for a household in the city was $28,160, and the median income for a family was $39,646. Males had a median income of $27,092 versus $26,125 for females. The per capita income for the city was $26,420. About 6.4% of families and 8.6% of the population were below the poverty line, including 14.5% of those under age 18 and 7.1% of those age 65 or over.

== Government ==
The city was incorporated on July 1, 1955. The South Pasadena City Commission is the elected legislative body of the city government. Legislative authority is divided among five commissioners, and one is appointed mayor every four years.

As of 2023, the current mayor is Arthur Penny, serving from 2022 to 2026, and the other city commissioners are Thomas Reid, Gail Neidinger, Ben Thomas, and Lynda Thompson.

South Pasadena has a mayor-commission form of government.

== Parks and recreation ==
The city owns and maintains several parks within its city limits:

- 14th Avenue Park
- Barbara Gilberg Habitat
- Fred Held South Pasadena Habitat
- Galatea Garden
- Huffman Way Park
- Island Drive Park
- Maynard A. Duryea Bay View Park, which includes several tennis courts and a playground.

The city also has several shops and businesses, including the Ten Pin bowling alley.

== Education ==
Public education is provided by Pinellas County Schools. No schools are located within South Pasadena's city limits, but nearby schools include Gulf Beaches Elementary Magnet School, St. John Vianney Catholic School (private), Pasadena Fundamental Elementary, Thurgood Marshall Middle School, and Boca Ciega High School. Additionally, a private K-12 boarding school, Admiral Farragut, operates nearby.
