= Florida State Road 699 =

Highway in Florida

State Road 699
- Gulf Boulevard
- SR 699 in red, CR 183 in blue

Route information
- Maintained by FDOT
- Length: 14.604 mi (23.503 km)

Major junctions
- South end: SR 682 in St. Pete Beach
- SR 666 in Madeira Beach
- North end: SR 688 in Indian Rocks Beach

Location
- Country: United States
- State: Florida

Highway system
- Florida State Highway System; Interstate; US; State; Former; Pre‑1945; Toll; Scenic
← SR 694	→ SR 700

Locally known as Gulf Boulevard and Blind Pass Road, State Road 699 (SR 699) is a 15-mile-long road running the length of the Pinellas County barrier islands in the Gulf of Mexico and serving the popular beaches near St. Petersburg, Clearwater, and Largo. The southern terminus of SR 699 is at the extreme western end of Pinellas Bayway (SR 682) in St. Pete Beach; the northern terminus is the extreme western end of SR 688 in Indian Rocks Beach. State Road 699 is the closest Gulf Coast analog to SR A1A on the Atlantic coast of Florida: indeed, the southernmost two miles (3 km) of SR 699 (between Corey Causeway (SR 693) and the Pinellas Bayway) are part of a loop that Florida Department of Transportation designated as A19A.

A six-mile-long continuation of Gulf Boulevard along Sand Key (to the bridge over Clearwater Pass) is designated County Road 183; a similar, shorter extension south of SR 682, Pass-a-Grille Way to Pass-a-Grille Park, is not a designated State or County Road. In addition to SR 688, SR 693, and the Pinellas Bayway, access to SR 699 from the mainland is made via the Stuart Welch Causeway (SR 666) and the Treasure Island Causeway (CR 150).

As of September 2013, FDOT and Pinellas County have discussed relinquishing SR 699 to county control with the rest of Gulf Boulevard.

== Major intersections ==
The entire route is in Pinellas County.

Location	mi	km	Destinations	Notes
St. Pete Beach	1.879	3.024	SR 682 east (Pinellas Bayway) to I-275 (Sunshine Skyway) / Gulf Boulevard – St. Petersburg, Fort Desoto Park, Pass-A-Grille	
St. Pete Beach	4.363	7.022	SR 693 north (75th Avenue / Corey Causeway) – South Pasadena	
Treasure Island	6.738	10.844	107th Avenue / Treasure Island Causeway (CR 150 east)	
Treasure Island; Madeira Beach	7.952– 8.113	12.798– 13.057	John's Pass Bridge over John's Pass	
Madeira Beach	9.731	15.661	SR 666 east (Tom Stuart Causeway / 150th Avenue)	
Indian Shores	13.54	21.79	CR 694 east to I-275 – Seminole, Pinellas Park	
Indian Rocks Beach	16.483	26.527	SR 688 east (Walsingham Road) / CR 183 north (Gulf Boulevard) – Tampa	
1.000 mi = 1.609 km; 1.000 km = 0.621 mi

== Bridges ==
=== John's Pass Bridge ===
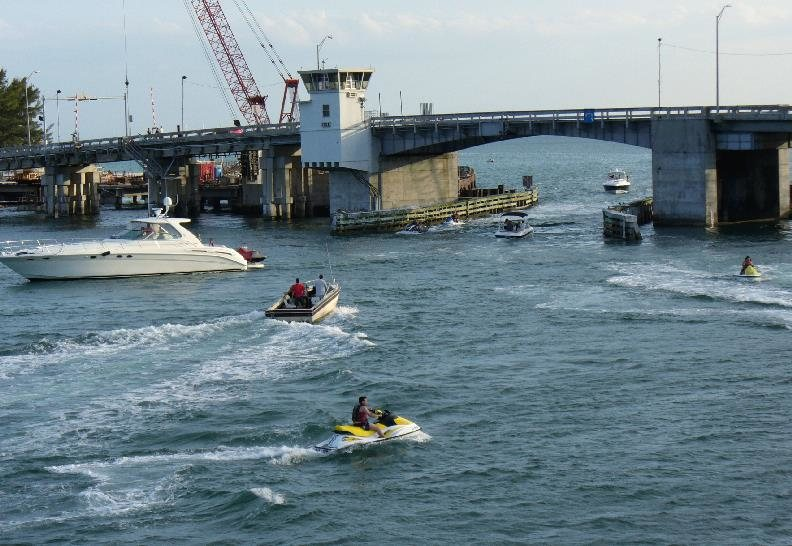
The original/second John's Pass bascule bridge in 2007, before it was replaced by the current bridge.

The John's Pass Bridge is a twin-span double-leaf bascule bridge that crosses the John's Pass, connecting Madeira Beach and Treasure Island, Florida. The bascule bridge carries Gulf Boulevard, part of SR 699. The southbound span of the Johns Pass Bridge was built in 2008, and the northbound span was built in 2010.

The first bridge was a two-lane bascule bridge built in 1927. But, the growth in the immediate Johns Pass area and strong currents could make the bridge collapse. Construction began on the second bridge in the late 1960s and was completed in 1971.

The second bridge was a twin-span bascule bridge built in 1971. But, the swift current prevalent in John's Pass. The frequent yet justified bridge openings have had motorists waiting lengthy periods to get across. One business just immediately south of John's Pass advertised drinks for 50 cents if the bridge was going up. Construction began on the current bridge in 2006.

The current bridge is a bigger twin-span bascule bridge built in 2008 (southbound) and 2010 (northbound). The southbound span of the second bridge has been demolished in 2006, and construction began on the current southbound. When the current southbound span was completed in 2008, the northbound span of the second bridge has been demolished, and construction began on the current northbound. The current northbound span was completed in 2010.
