= Boca Ciega Bay =

Body of water in Florida

Coordinates: 27.774°N 82.754°W

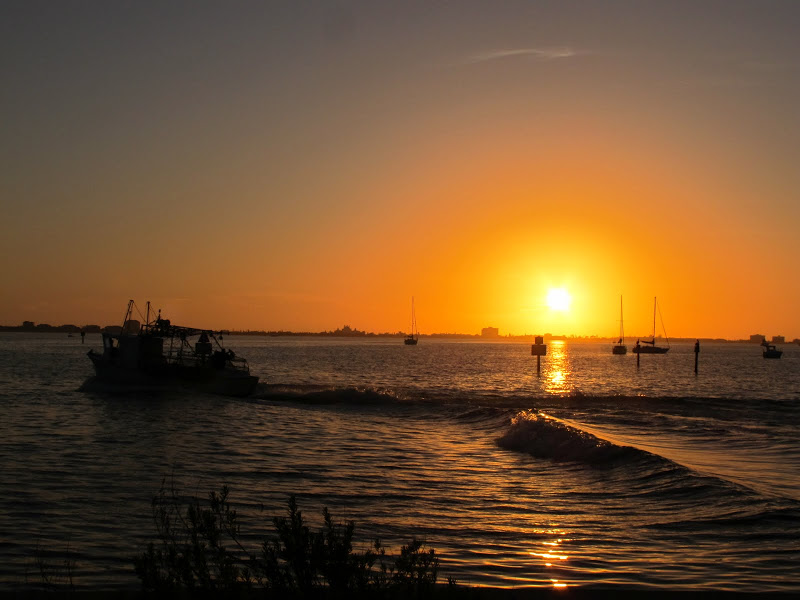
A December sunset from Clam Bayou Park looking over Boca Ciega Bay

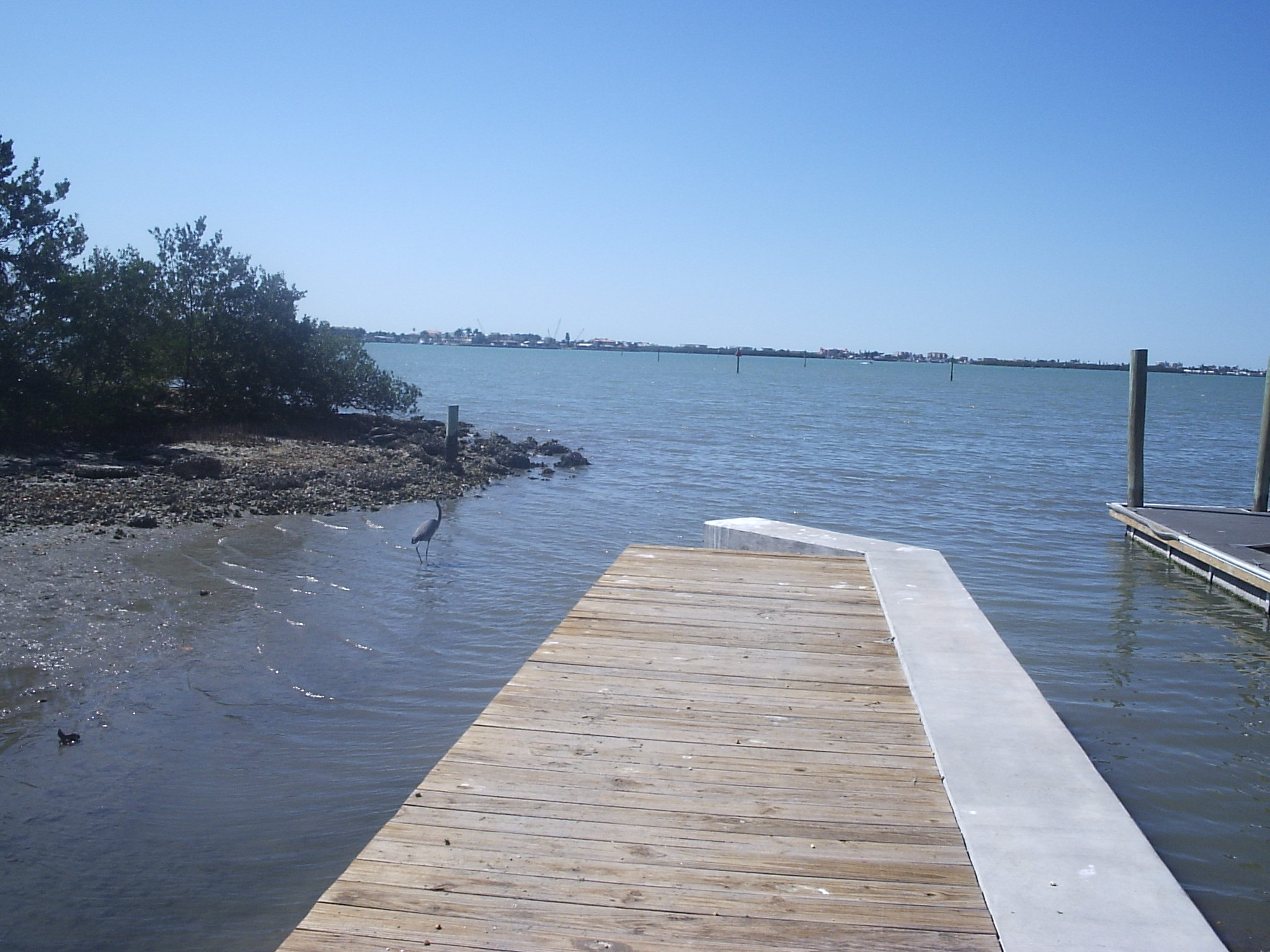
View over a boat ramp on Boca Ciega Bay

Boca Ciega Bay is a body of water connected to the Gulf of Mexico on the west-central coast of Florida. It is bordered by Gulfport, St. Petersburg, and other municipalities in Pinellas County. Clam Bayou estuary feeds into the bay.

Boca Ciega Bay is an aquatic preserve designated in 1968 to halt dredging-and-filling work done in the 1950s. There are mangrove islands as well as miles of canals bounded by seawalls.

Along with the Pinellas County Aquatic Preserve, Boca Ciega Bay provides sandy beaches, mangrove shoreline and submerged habitats such as oyster bars, seagrass beds, coral habitat, and spring-fed caves.

The 186-acre Boca Ciega Millennium Park in Seminole, Florida, is a protected natural area and preserve. The park features a 35-foot wooden observation tower with a panoramic view of Boca Ciega Bay. The park is a stop on the Florida Fish and Wildlife Conservation Commission's "Great Florida Birding Trail." Five ponds in the park treat stormwater runoff before it reaches the bay.

Archaeological digs show that the eastern shore of the bay was inhabited by prehistoric native Americans, in particular during the late Weeden Island and Safety Harbor periods, from roughly 800 A.D. to 1700 A.D. Some also believe that the area was visited as early as 1528 by the Spanish explorer Pánfilo de Narváez.

== See also ==
- Intracoastal Waterway
