= Florida Department of Transportation =

State transportation agency in Florida, United States

Florida Department of Transportation (FDOT)
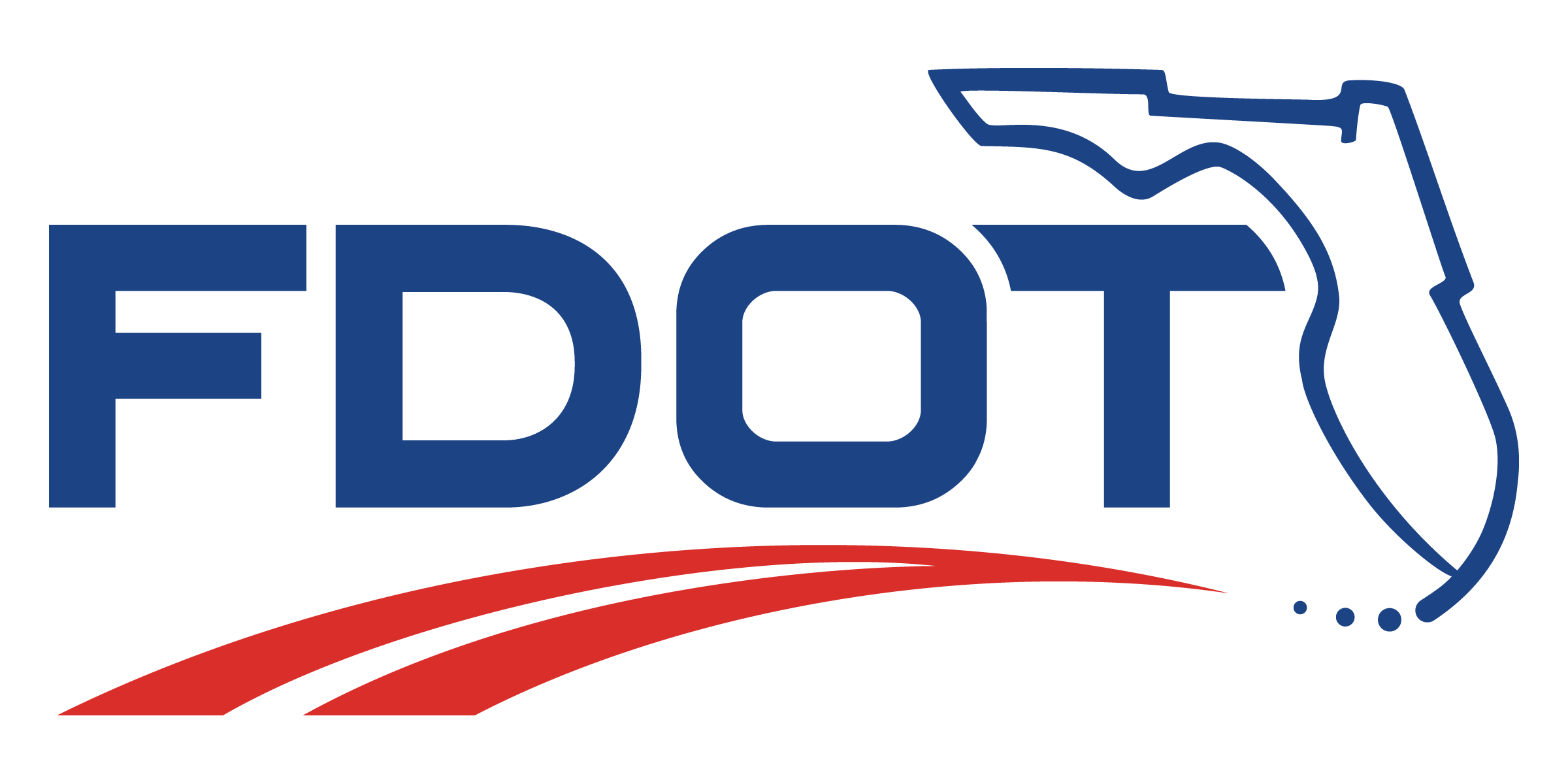
- Official Seal

Agency overview
- Formed: 1969
- Preceding agency: State Road Department (SRD)
- Jurisdiction: Florida
- Headquarters: 605 Suwannee Street, Tallahassee, Florida, U.S.
- Agency executives: Jared W. Perdue, Secretary of Transportation; Ron DeSantis, Governor of Florida
- Website: fdot.gov

The Florida Department of Transportation (FDOT) is a decentralized agency charged with the establishment, maintenance, and regulation of public transportation in the U.S. state of Florida. The department was formed in 1969. It absorbed the powers of the State Road Department (SRD). The current Secretary of Transportation is Jared W. Perdue.

== History ==
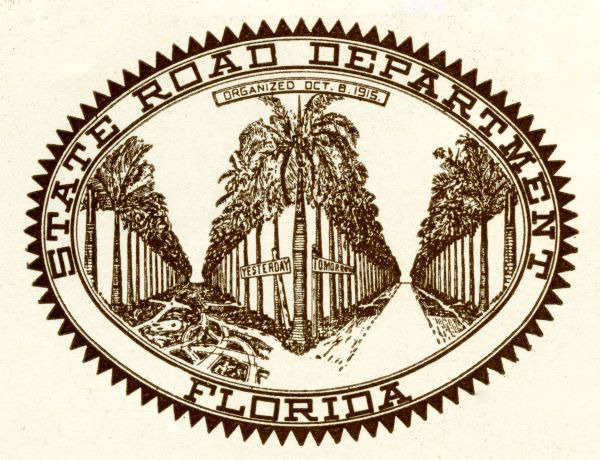
The original logo of the Florida State Road Department.

The State Road Department, the predecessor of today's Department of Transportation, was authorized in 1915 by the Florida Legislature. For the first two years of its existence, the department acted as an advisory body to the 52 counties in the state, helping to assemble maps and other information on roads.

The 1916 Bankhead Act passed by Congress expanded the department's responsibilities and gave it the authority to: establish a state and state-aid system of roads, engage in road construction and maintenance, acquire and own land, exercise the right of eminent domain, and accept federal or local funds for use in improving roads.

The Office of Motor Carrier Compliance created in 1980 transitioned from the Florida Department of Transportation to the Florida Highway Patrol (FHP) division of the Florida Department of Highway Safety and Motor Vehicles (FLHSMV) on July 1, 2011. The consolidation is a result of Senate Bill 2160, passed by lawmakers during the 2011 Legislative Session, and placed the commercial vehicle licensing, registrations, fuel permits, and enforcement all under the purview of DHSMV.

== Structure ==
The Florida Transportation Commission, made up of nine commissioners chosen by Florida's governor and Legislature, provides oversight for the state's department of transportation (DOT).

The department consists of seven geographic districts. In May 1994, an eighth district was formed for the state's Turnpike System. In April 2002, the Turnpike district expanded as Florida's Turnpike Enterprise (FTE) and operates as the business unit for the department. The FTE owns and maintains 511 miles (822 km) of toll roads.

Each district is managed by a district secretary. The department also owns and maintains other toll roads and bridges: the Garcon Point Bridge, Sunshine Skyway Bridge, Alligator Alley, the Beachline East Expressway, the Pinellas Bayway, and the Seminole and Lake County portions of otherwise Central Florida Expressway Authority owned roads. Tolls on all department-owned facilities are collected by Florida's Turnpike Enterprise. In addition, FDOT operates and manages several park-and-ride lots and Commuter Assistance Programs throughout the state. The seven districts each have a Districtwide Commuter Assistance Program.

=== Districts ===
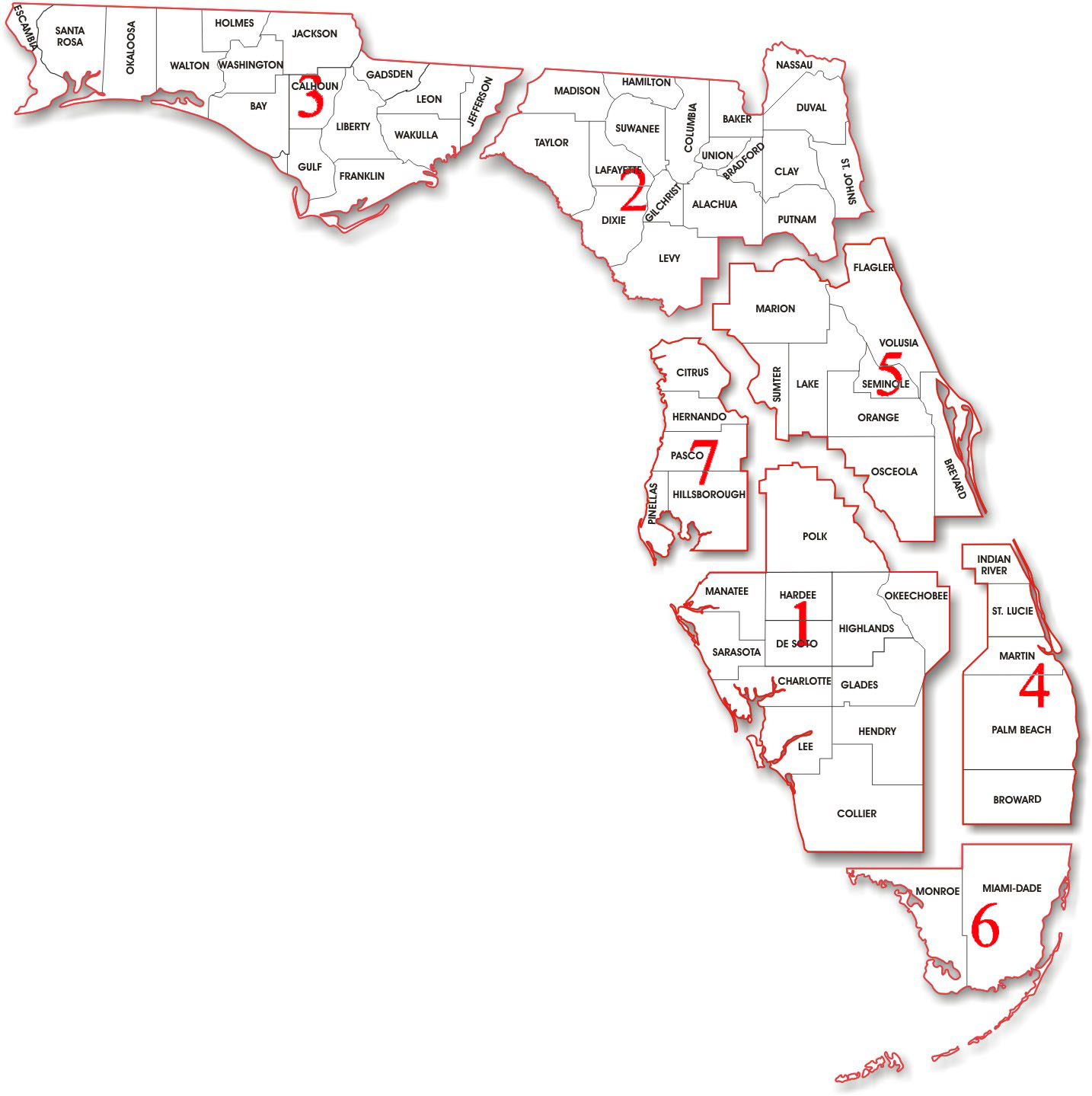
Map of FDOT Districts

Florida has seven transportation districts and a separate unit for tolled facilities under Florida's Turnpike Enterprise. Each district is managed by a district secretary. Each district also has major divisions for administration, planning, production, and operations.

FDOT Districts Overview
District Number	District Name	Headquarters	Counties
1	Southwest Florida	Bartow	Charlotte, Collier, De Soto, Glades, Hardee, Hendry, Highlands, Lee, Manatee, Okeechobee, Polk, and Sarasota
2	Northeast Florida	Lake City	Alachua, Baker, Bradford, Clay, Columbia, Dixie, Duval, Gilchrist, Hamilton, Lafayette, Levy, Madison, Nassau, Putnam, St. Johns, Suwannee, Taylor, and Union
3	Northwest Florida	Chipley	Bay, Calhoun, Escambia, Franklin, Gadsden, Gulf, Holmes, Jackson, Jefferson, Leon, Liberty, Okaloosa, Santa Rosa, Wakulla, Walton, and Washington
4	Southeast Florida	Fort Lauderdale	Broward, Indian River, Martin, Palm Beach, and St. Lucie
5	Central Florida	DeLand	Brevard, Flagler, Lake, Marion, Orange, Osceola, Seminole, Sumter, Volusia
6	South Florida	Miami	Miami-Dade and Monroe
7	West Central Florida	Tampa	Citrus, Hernando, Hillsborough, Pasco, and Pinellas

=== Notable projects ===
In 1954, the State Road Department completed the original Sunshine Skyway Bridge, the first fixed span to connect Saint Petersburg directly to Bradenton. This greatly shortened the travel time between the two cities, as before cars would have to either use a ferry or drive about 70 miles (110 km) around Tampa Bay. A parallel span was completed in 1971 to make the bridge Interstate standard, and it became part of I-275. After the newer, southbound span was destroyed in 1980 when the SS Summit Venture collided into it, a replacement bridge was finished in 1987.

In 1974, FDOT completed Florida's Turnpike, a 312-mile (502 km) limited access toll highway that connected the panhandle area through Orlando to Miami. The turnpike is part of an initiative to finance transportation with user fees.

== See also ==
- Florida State Highway System
