= Dolphin (structure) =

Man-made marine structure

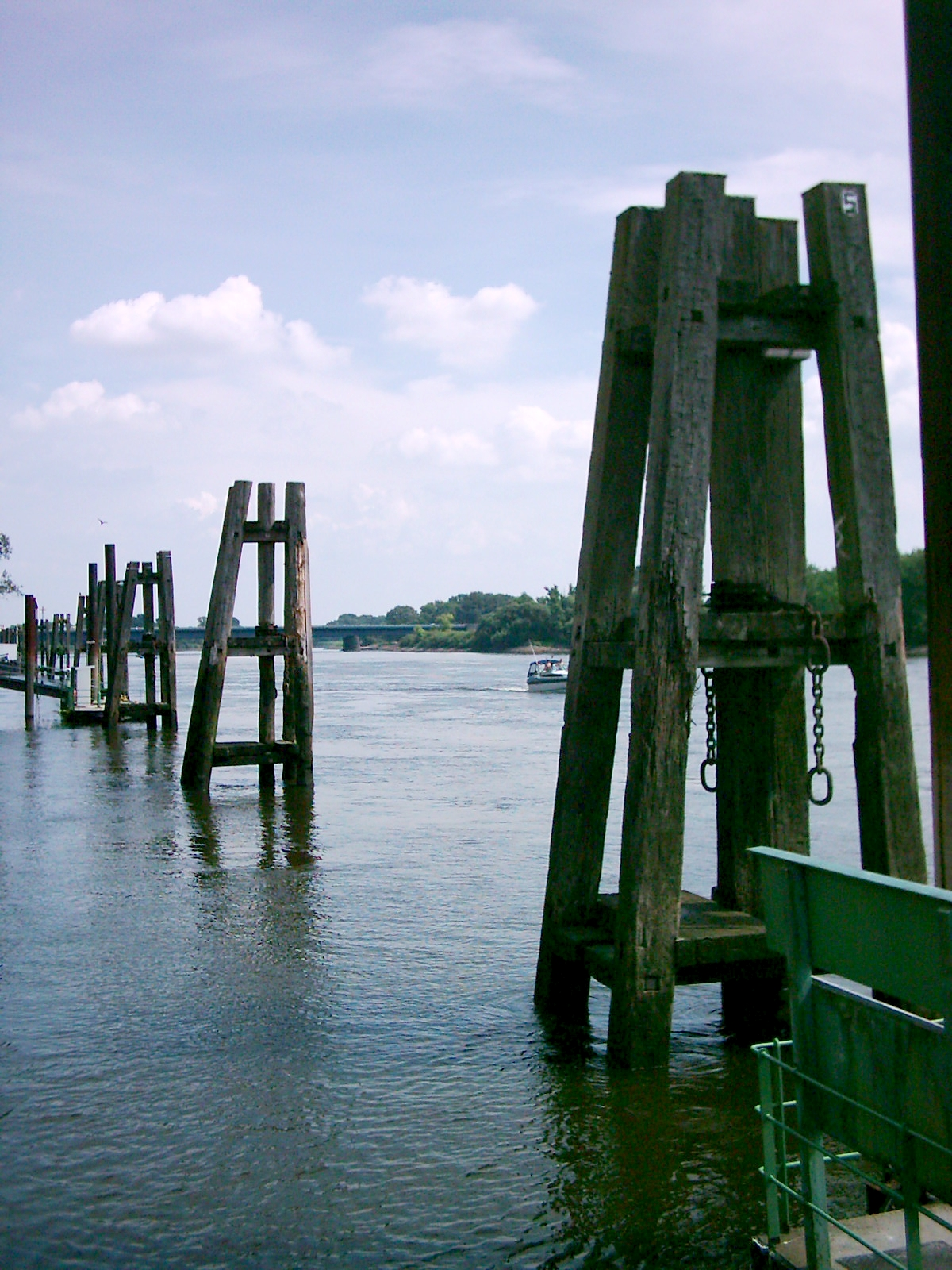
Wood pilings grouped into a pair of dolphins serving as a protected entryway to a boat basin

A dolphin is a group of pilings arrayed together to serve variously as a protective hardpoint along a dock, in a waterway, or along a shore; as a means or point of stabilization of a dock, bridge, or similar structure; as a mooring point; and as a base for navigational aids.

== Structure ==
Dolphins typically consist of a number of piles driven into the seabed or riverbed, and connected above the water level to provide a platform or fixing point. The piles can be untreated or pressure-treated timber piles, or steel or reinforced concrete piles. Smaller dolphins can have the piles drawn together with wire rope, but larger dolphins are typically fixed using a reinforced concrete capping or a structural steel frame.

Access to a dolphin may be via a pedestrian bridge, particularly in the case of mooring dolphins, but is often by boat.

== Use ==
=== As mooring point ===
Dolphins are usually installed to provide a fixed structure when it would be impractical to extend the shore to provide a dry-access facility, for example, when the number of ships is greater than can be accommodated by the length of the berth/pier. Typical uses include extending a berth (a berthing dolphin) or providing a mooring point (a mooring dolphin).

=== To protect structures ===
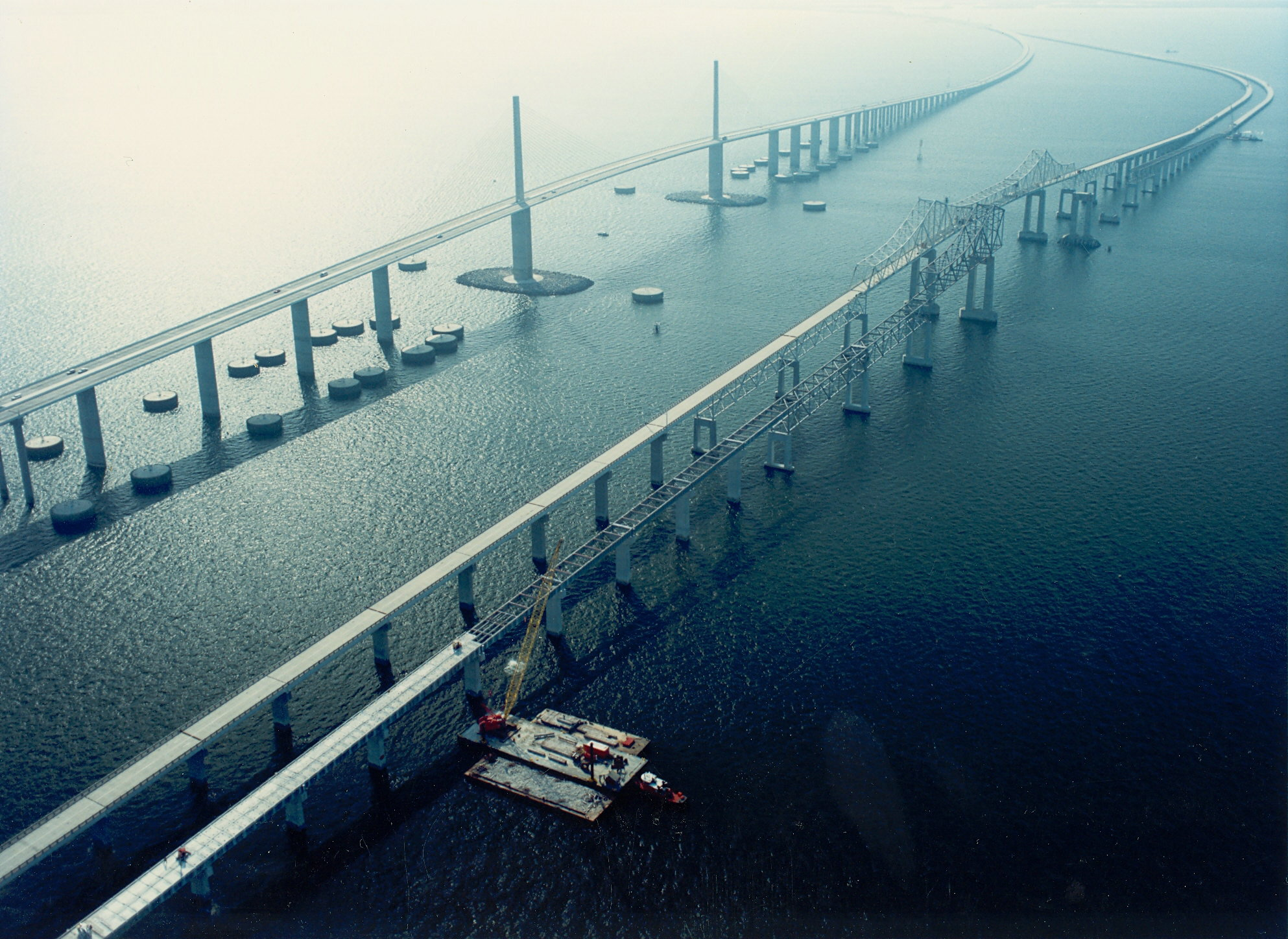
Multiple concrete dolphins (left) protect the 1987 span of the Sunshine Skyway Bridge from ship collisions.

Dolphins are also used to protect structures from possible impact by ships, in a similar fashion to fenders. A notable example of dolphins used to protect a bridge is the Sunshine Skyway Bridge across the mouth of Tampa Bay. In 1980, the MV Summit Venture hit a pier on one of the bridge's two spans, causing a 1,200-foot (370 m) section of the bridge to fall into the water, resulting in 35 deaths. When a replacement span was designed, a top priority was to prevent ships from colliding with the new bridge. The new bridge is protected by 36 dolphins — four large dolphins protecting the two main pylons supporting the cable-stayed main span plus 32 smaller dolphins protecting bridge piers for 1/4 mile (400 m) to either side of the main span. The cost of the dolphins was $41 million (equivalent to $97 million in 2024 dollars).

=== To support navigational aids ===
Dolphins are also used to house navigation aids such as lights or day beacons, and display regulatory information such as speed limits and other safety information, or even advertising.

== See also ==
- Starling (structure) — a protective base for bridge piers
