= Skyway Fishing Pier State Park =

State park in Florida, United States

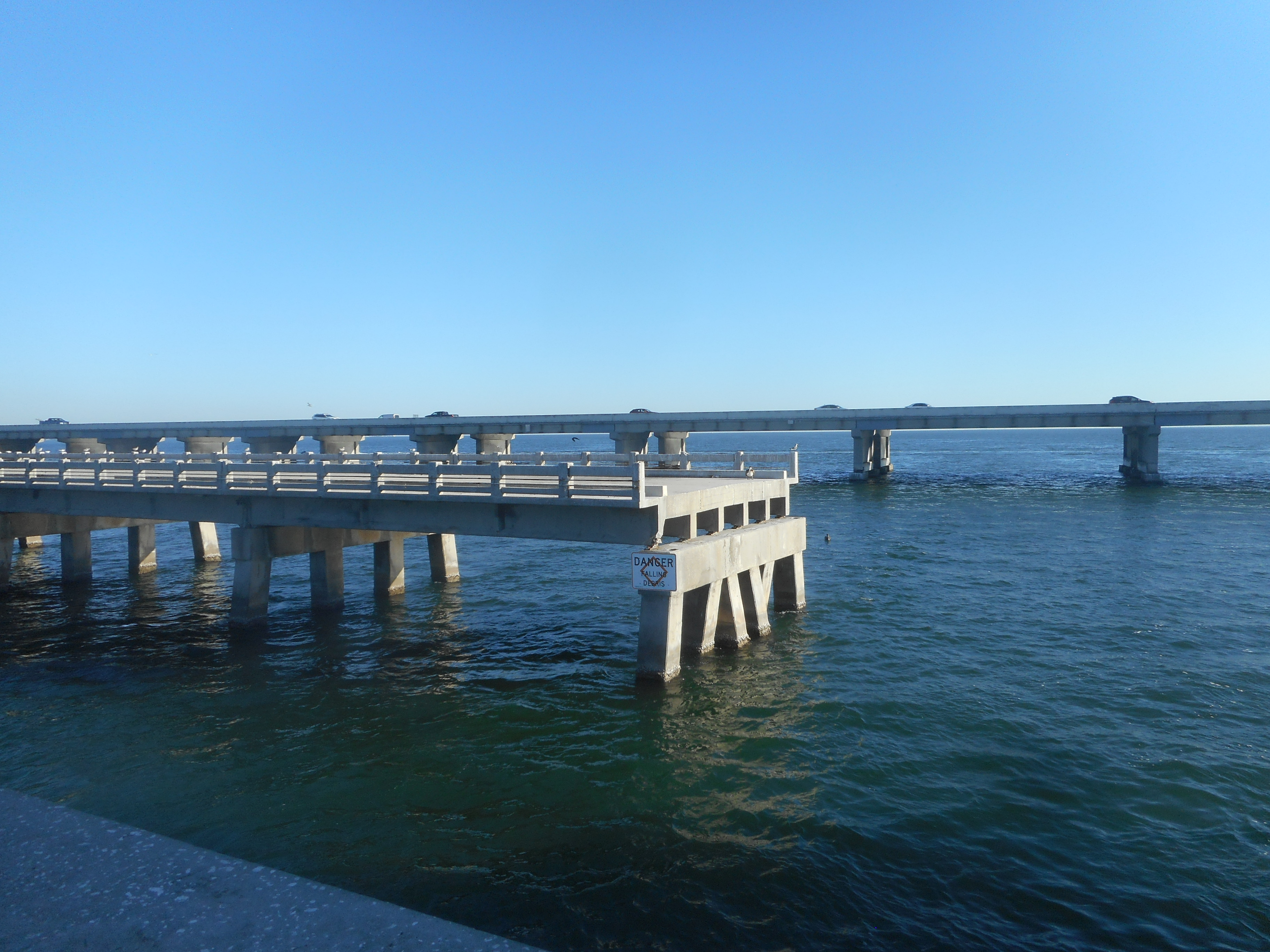
- Current Sunshine Skyway Bridge and Former Northbound Skyway as seen from the North section of the Fishing Pier

- Location within Florida Location within the United States
- Interactive map of Skyway Fishing Pier State Park
- Location: Pinellas and Manatee Counties, Florida, United States
- Nearest city: St. Petersburg, Florida
- Coordinates: 27°40′41″N 82°40′41″W
- Established: 1994
- Governing body: Florida Department of Environmental Protection

Skyway Fishing Pier State Park is a Florida State Park located on the north and south sides of the mouth of Tampa Bay. When the original cantilevered Sunshine Skyway Bridge, carrying US 19 (I-275 was not signed on the Skyway until the new bridge opened in 1987), partially collapsed in 1980, due to the collision of a freighter on one of its pilings, it was replaced by the current bridges. The approaches to the old bridge, however, were left in place and converted into the longest fishing pier in the world.

The most common activity on the pier is fishing. Common catches include snook, tarpon, grouper, black sea bass, Spanish mackerel, king mackerel, cobia, sheepshead, Mangrove Snapper, grunts, sharks, Goliath Grouper, Lane Snapper, flounder, and many more.

Other pier activities include sightseeing, photography, kiteboarding, kayaking, and wind surfing.

Snacks, drinks, bait, and fishing supplies can be purchased on the pier, which has a fee for admission. The park is open 24 hours a day, 365 days a year.

== Closing of eastern portion ==
In August 2008, Florida Department of Transportation officials announced that the eastern part of the pier would be closed on August 29, 2008, for safety reasons. Built in 1954, after 50 years of corrosion and wear and tear, it had worn out. The western portion, built 17 years later, were still deemed safe to use. Parts of the eastern piers connected to the western one, as well as unused approaches to the original spans were demolished in 2008. north end of south pier is also closed to fishing as of first of November 2025.

== Gallery ==
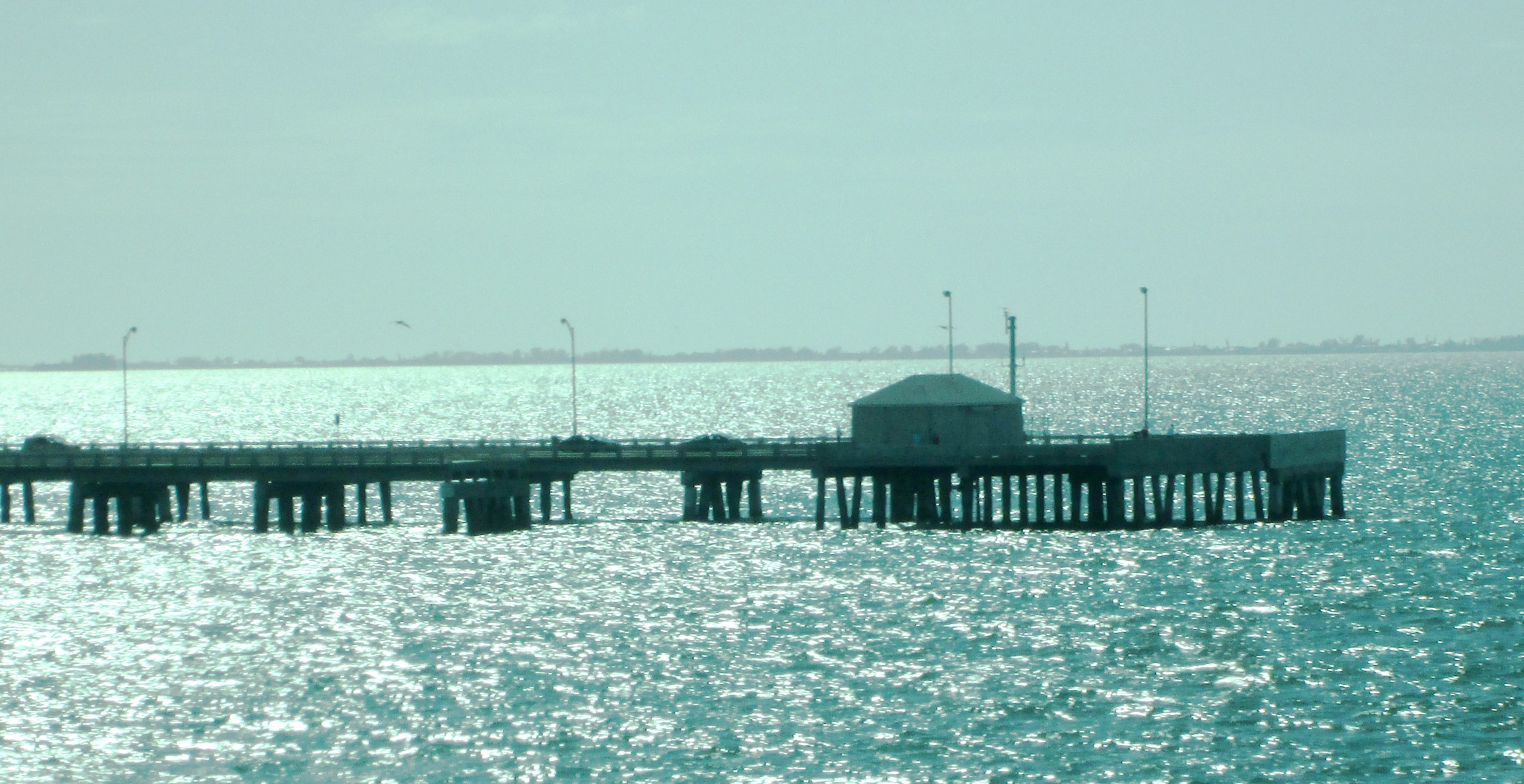
Eastern pier

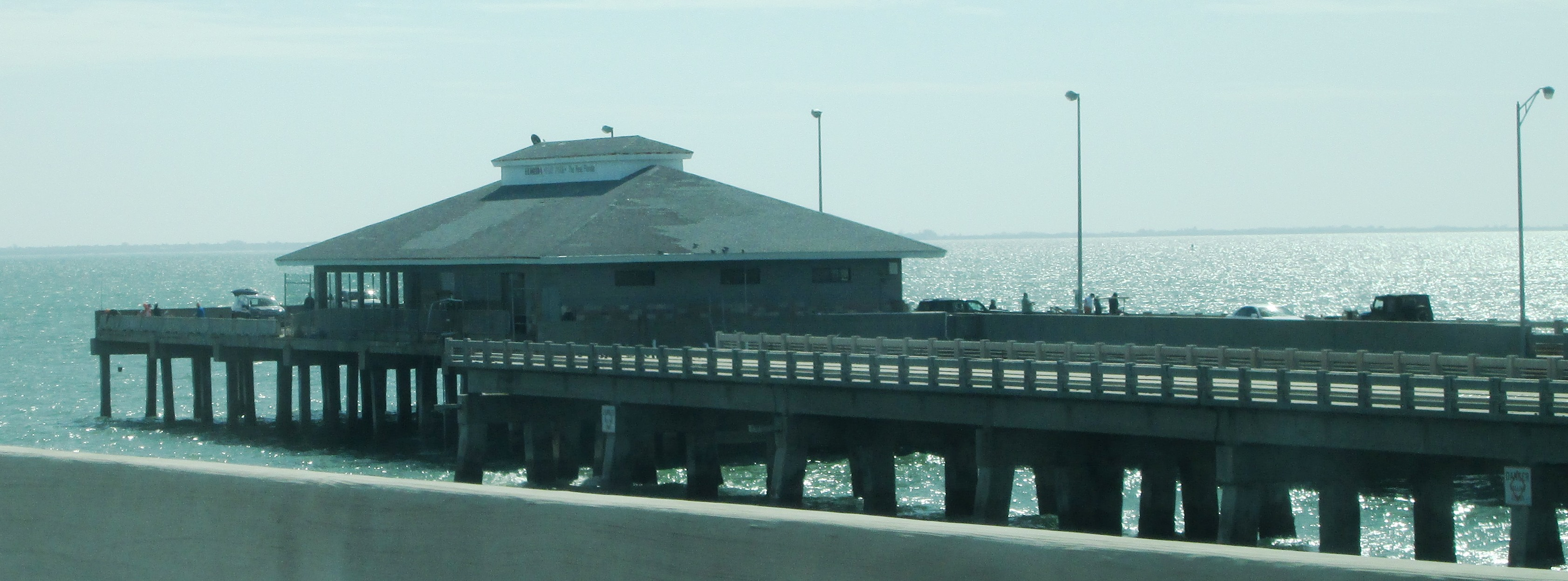
Western pier
