= Bridge protection systems =

Methods to reduce damage to bridges

Bridge protection systems prevent ship collision damage to a bridge by either deflecting an aberrant ship from striking the piers of a bridge, or sustaining and absorbing the impact.

== History ==
Protecting bridges against ship collisions got the attention of architects and regulators in the last third of the 20th century due to a marked increase in the frequency of collision accidents: worldwide, 30 major bridges collapsed in the 1960-1998 timeframe after being rammed by ships or barges, 321 persons were killed. The rate of smaller accidents is much higher: there were 811 serious accidents that did not cause a collapse just in the United States between 1970 and 1974, with 14 persons killed. Minor collisions are routine: the US Coast Guard gets 35 reports per day.

In the US, the turning point was the collapse of the Sunshine Skyway Bridge in 1980. Since then,

- A "Committee on Ship/Barge Collision" appointed by the National Research Council issued a report on the history of ship collisions with bridges (1983);
- The Louisiana Department of Transportation and Development issued vessel collision protection criteria for the bridge piers in Louisiana (1984);
- Eleven states together with the Federal Highway Administration commissioned guidelines for the bridge protection design in the United States (1988);
- The American Association of State Highway and Transportation Officials (AASHTO) issued a Vessel Collision Design Guide Specification in February, 1991, based on the previous study;
- The International Association for Bridge and Structural Engineering published its "Ship Collision with Bridges" guide in 1993;
- AASHTO adopted the LRFD bridge design specifications with provisions for bridge protection (1994).

== Designs ==
There are several types of bridge protection systems used:

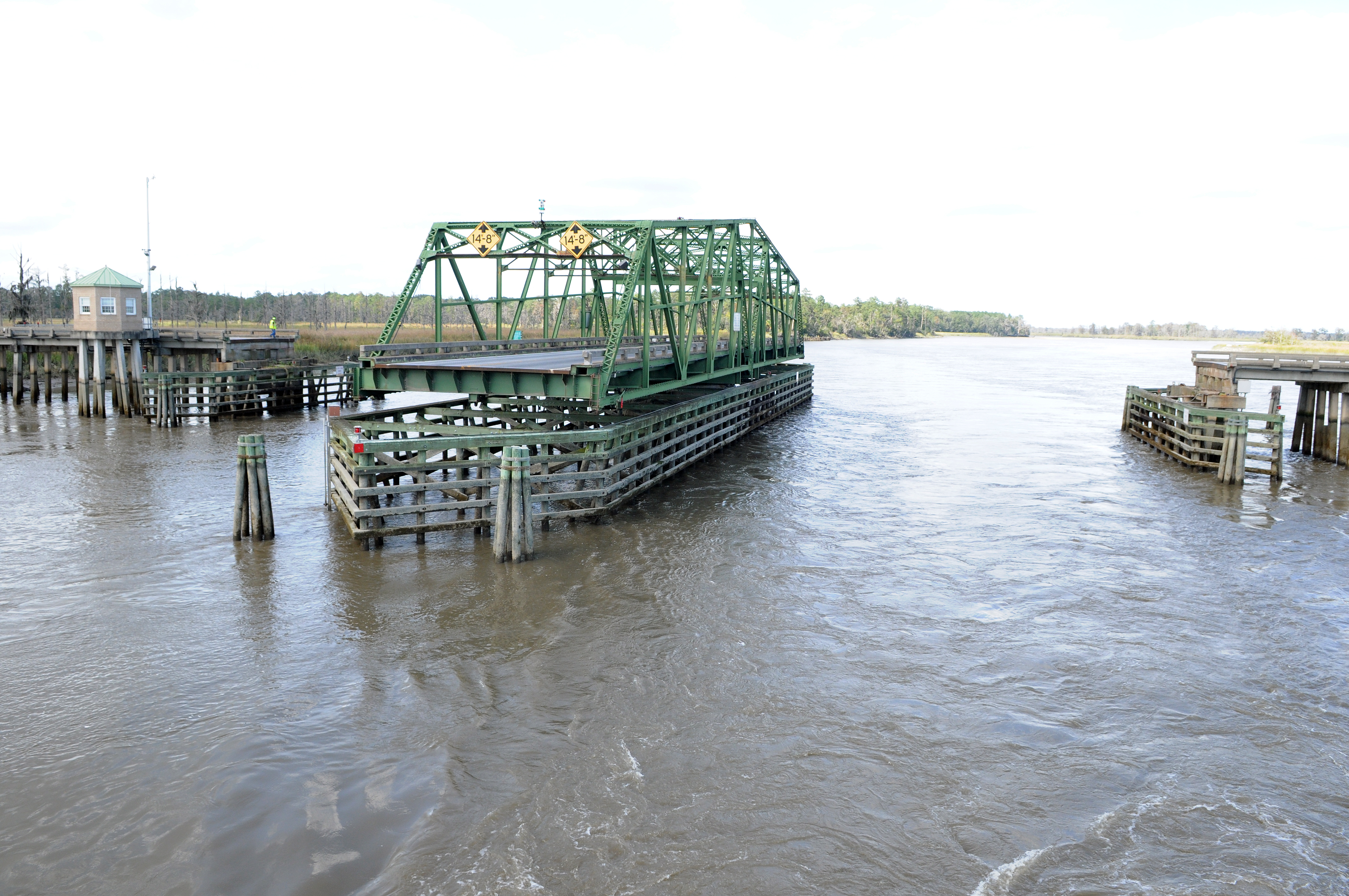
Pile-supported fender system on the (swing) James P. Houlihan Memorial Bridge

- Fender systems attached to the pier with the goal to absorb the vessel impact. Their ability to withstand a typical ship collision is low. Fenders are built using a variety of materials:
  - thin-walled concrete box;
  - thin-walled steel membrane steel;
  - rubber.

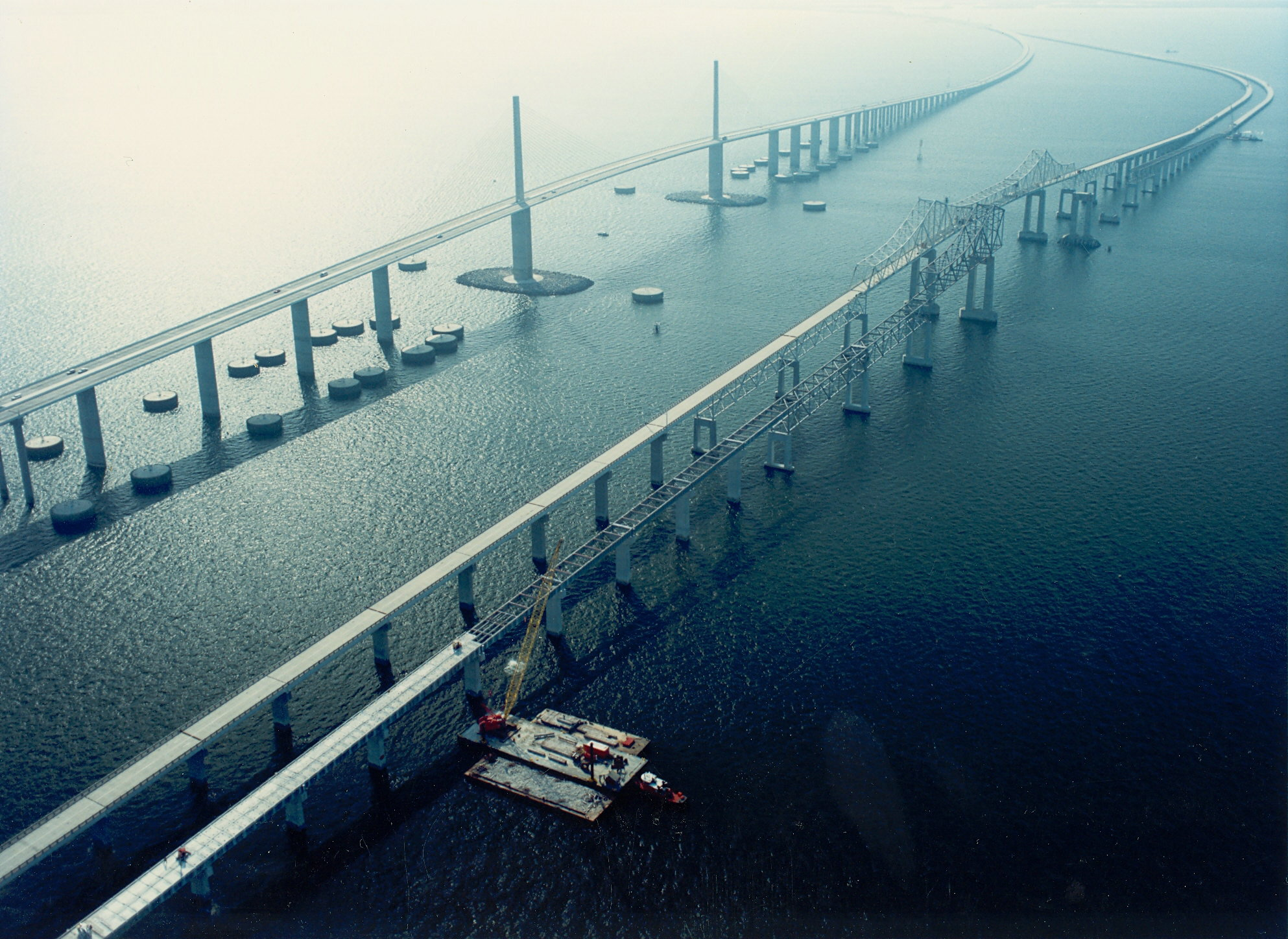
Dolphins and artificial islands surrounding piers of the new (farthest) Sunshine Skyway Bridge. Note the collapsed spans of the old (nearest) bridge

- artificial islands built with sand and rock core that is protected by riprap. The islands are quite effective in protecting the pier by pushing the ship away, but cause environmental damage to the river bottom and, while settling, might shift the bridge piers;
- dolphins are made of piles driven into the river bottom in a group, with space in between sometimes filled with rocks and capped with concrete. The collision is absorbed via deformations of the structure;
- pile-supported systems on dedicated piles that are driven into the bottom either vertically or at an angle ("batter piles"). The piles are connected together with rigid or flexible links, can be attached to the pier, and sometimes are fitted with fenders;
- floating systems (cable nets and pontoons) have multiple problems from low efficiency to high construction and maintenance costs and environmental impacts, and are therefore used as a last resort, when the location of the bridge precludes the use of other designs.
- Starlings are widenings of the bridge piers near their base, typically extending some distance above water level, providing some degree of reinforcement of the pier against impact.

== Alternatives ==
Physical bridge protection systems designed to prevent catastrophic collisions are expensive and represent a "significant" share of overall construction costs. Therefore, alternatives are typically considered during the design phase:

- fortifying the piers and superstructure to the point where they will be able to handle the impact, either on their own, or with the help of a fender system;
- increasing the span length, so that the piers are away from the fairway and thus protected by the shallow water around them;
- improving the navigational aids to reduce the probability of a catastrophic impact (60-85% of the collisions are due to pilot error.

== Regulations ==
Highway designs in the US are subject to the AASHTO specifications, but the text does not contain specific procedures and recommendations. Railway bridges are built according to the "Manual for Railway Engineering" published by the American Railway Engineering and Maintenance-of-Way Association (AREMA).

In Australia, the subject is covered in the Australian standard AS 5100.2:2017, "Bridge design, Part 2: Design loads".

== Sources ==
- Knott, Michael; Prucz, Zolan (2000). "Vessel Collison Design of Bridges". Bridge Engineering Handbook (PDF). Boca Raton: CRC Press.
- Wuttrich, Rafal; Wekezer, Jerry; Yazdani, Nur; Wilson, Claudia (2001). "Performance evaluation of existing bridge fenders for ship impact". Journal of Performance of Constructed Facilities. 15 (1): 17–23. doi:10.1061/(ASCE)0887-3828(2001)15:1(17).
