= Starling (structure) =

Support structure in engineering

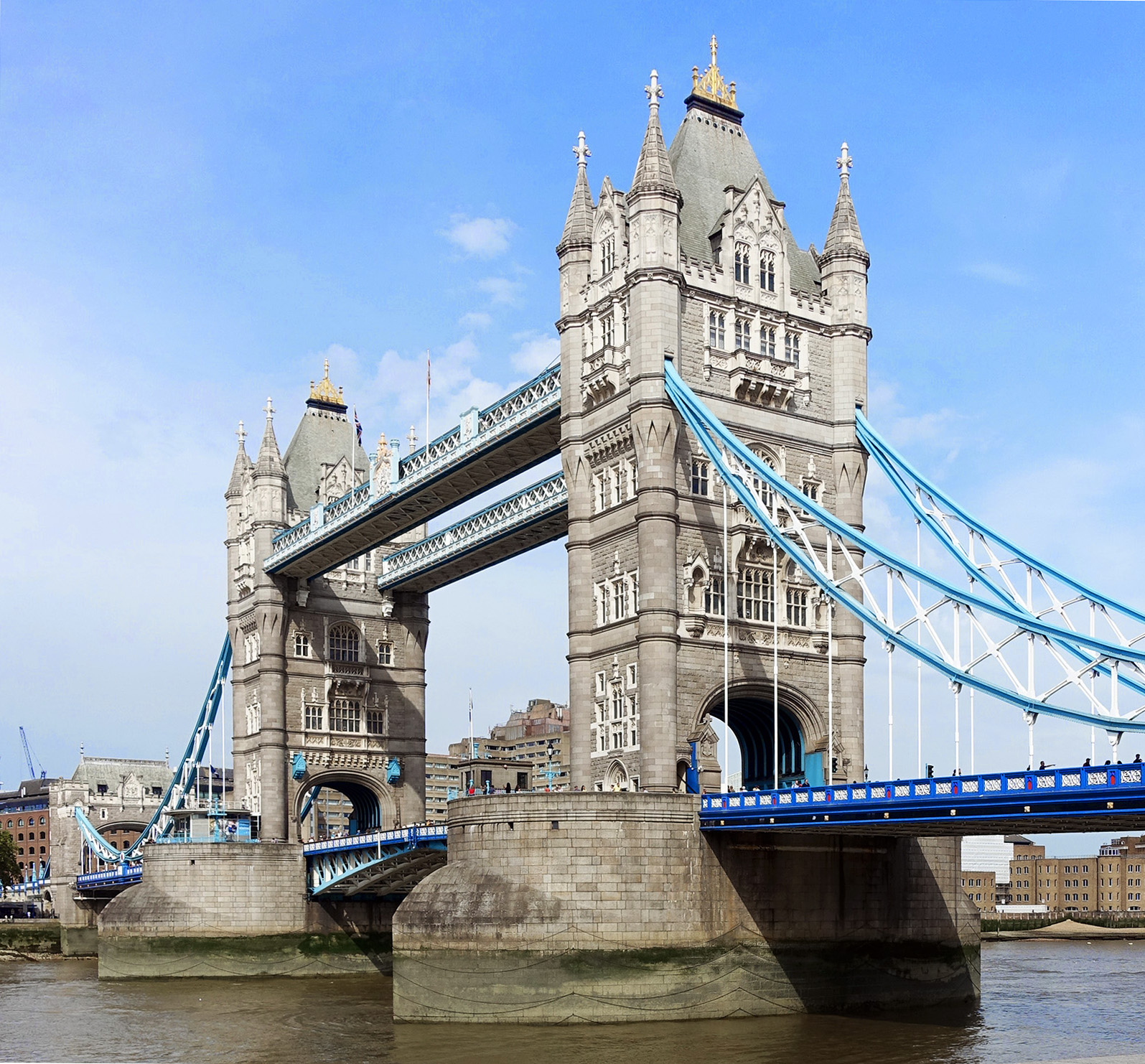
The starlings of Tower Bridge, London, are clearly seen beneath the roadway.

In architecture, a starling (or sterling) is a defensive bulwark, usually built with pilings or bricks or blocks of stone, surrounding the supports (or piers) of a bridge or similar construction.

Starlings may be shaped to ease the flow of the water around the bridge, reducing the damage caused by erosion or collisions with flood-borne debris or river traffic. They may also form an important part of the structure of the bridge, spreading the weight of the piers.

The term cutwater is used for such a structure shaped with water flow in mind, as a pier or starling with a diamond point. A starkwater is a bulwark against ice floes.

Depending on their shape and location, some starlings may accumulate river debris, mud and other objects, potentially creating navigational hazards or hindering downstream water flow.

== Shape ==
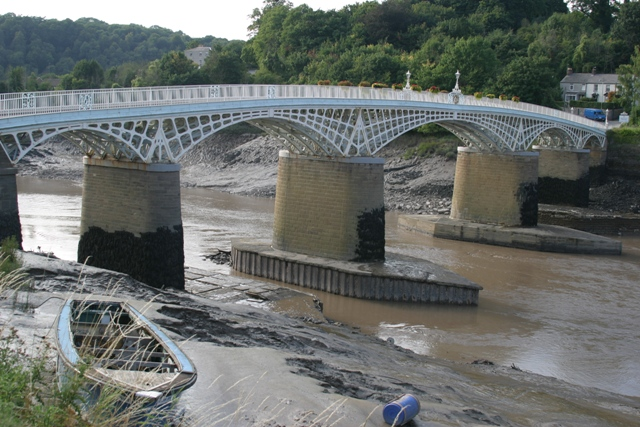
Old Wye Bridge, Chepstow, low tide, looking upstream.

Starlings may form part of a buttress for the vertical load of the bridge piers, so would typically be symmetrical. Other symmetrical starlings may be used on tidal stretches of rivers because of bi-directional flow, requiring dual cutwaters; at low tide, Old Wye Bridge, Chepstow, on the Welsh border, can be seen to have cutwaters on both ends of the piers and their foundations. Cutwaters may also be provided downstream to reduce riverbed scour. Other starlings may be asymmetrical, with only an upstream cutwater, the downstream end being flat or rounded.

The starling has a sharpened or curved extremity, sometimes called the nose. The cutwater may be of concrete or masonry, but is often capped with a steel angle to resist abrasion, focusing force at a single point to fracture floating pieces of ice striking the pier. In cold climates, the starling is typically sloped by about 20 to 45° from vertical, so current pushing against part-submerged ice tends to lift and shear it; this can be known as a starkwater. This is distinct from a sloping top to shed the rain.

On a narrow bridge, a cutwater shape can be carried up to the top of the parapet, to provide a pedestrian refuge.

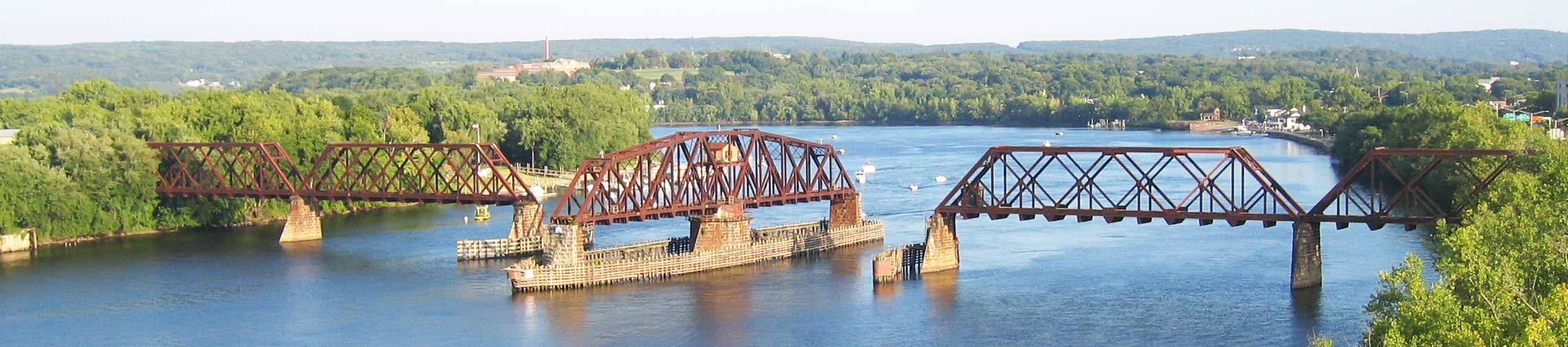
Middletown–Portland railroad bridge, Connecticut: starlings on the bridge piers and at each end of the swing span (the fence-like structures around the piers are pile-supported bridge fenders).

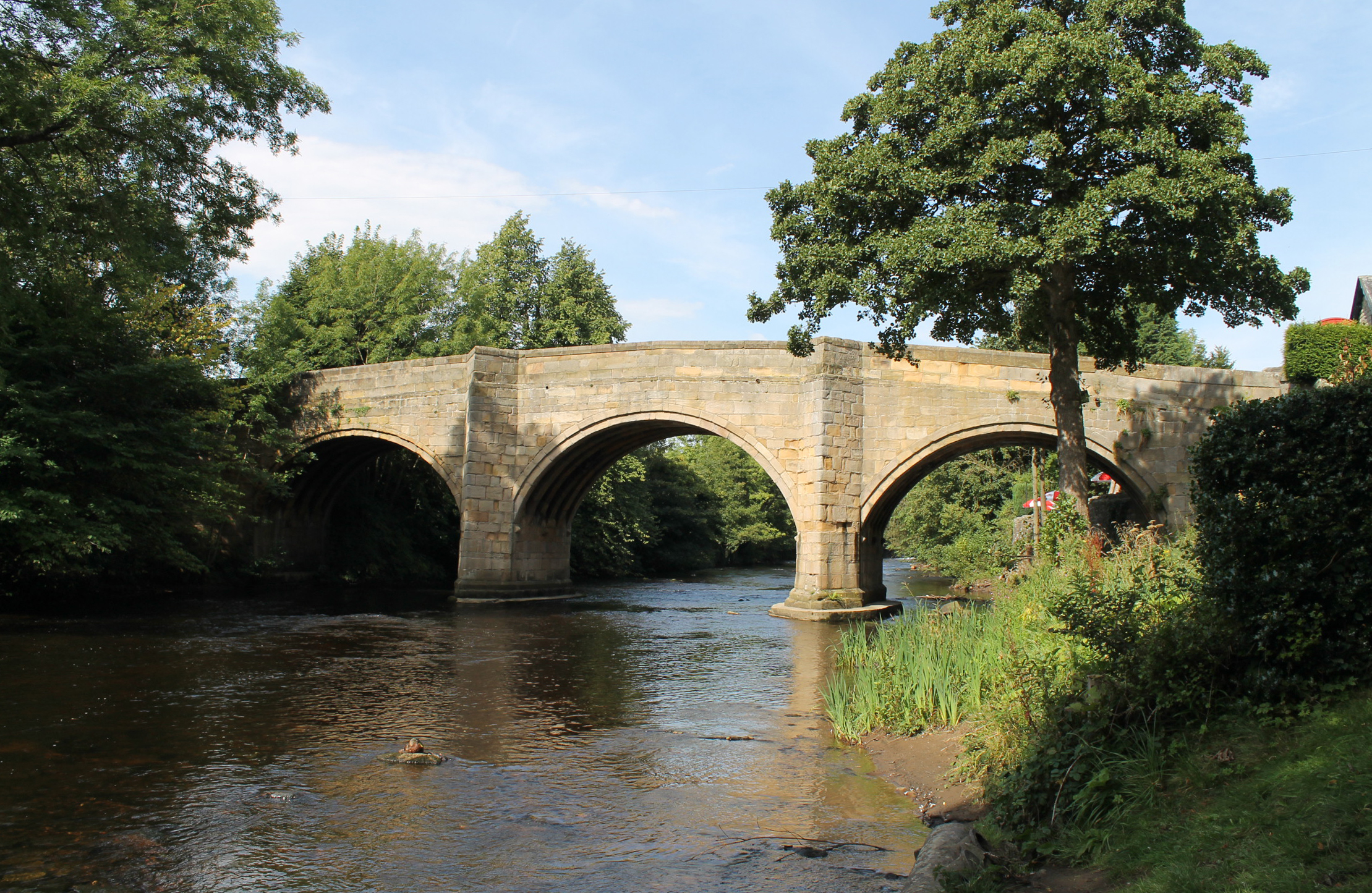
Refuges on Baslow Bridge, Derbyshire.

== See also ==
- Dolphin (structure)
- Breakwater
- Icebreaker
