= Sunshine Skyway Bridge =

Bridge over Tampa Bay, Florida, United States

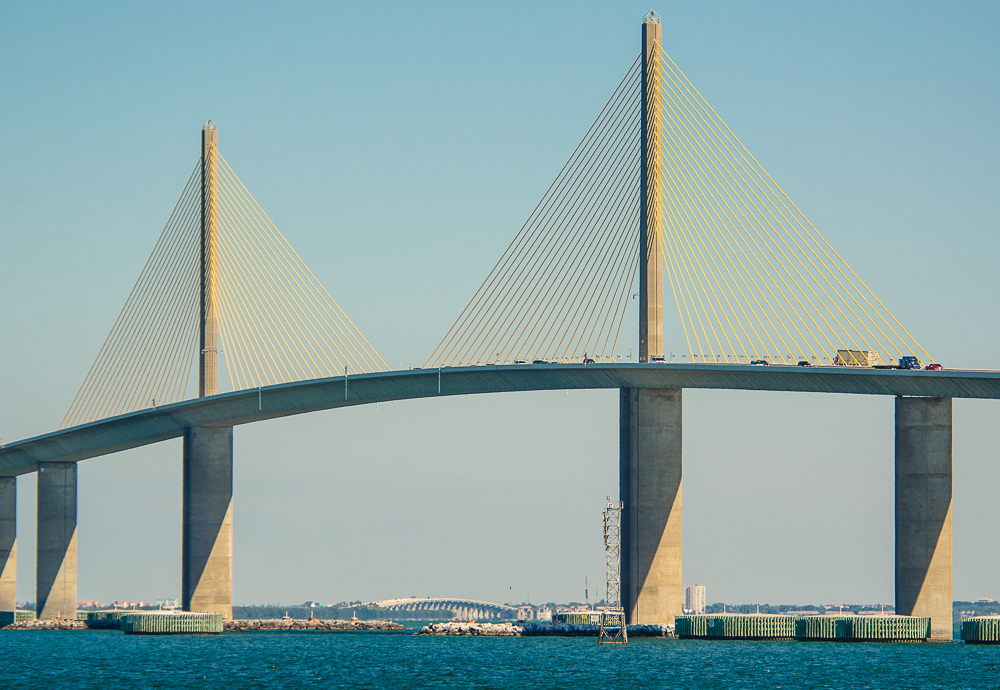
- Coordinates: 27°37′30″N 82°39′31″W
- Carries: 4 lanes of I-275 Toll / US 19 Toll
- Crosses: Tampa Bay
- Locale: South of St. Petersburg and north of Terra Ceia, Florida
- Official name: Bob Graham Sunshine Skyway Bridge
- Other name: The Skyway
- Named for: Bob Graham
- Maintained by: Florida Department of Transportation
- ID number: 150189

Characteristics
- Design: Cable-stayed
- Total length: 4.14 mi (6.7 km)
- Width: 94 ft (29 m)
- Height: 430 ft (131 m)
- Longest span: 1,200 ft (366 m)
- Clearance below: 181 ft (55 m)
- No. of lanes: 4

History
- Engineering design by: Figg & Muller Engineering Group
- Constructed by: American Bridge Company
- Construction start: June 1982
- Construction cost: $244 million (equivalent to $688 million in 2025 dollars)
- Opened: April 20, 1987; 39 years ago
- Replaces: Sunshine Skyway Bridge

Statistics
- Daily traffic: 65,215 (2026)
- Toll: $1.75 toll by plate (Note: Plus $2.50 administrative fee.); ($1.16 with SunPass)

Location
- Interactive map of Sunshine Skyway Bridge

Sunshine Skyway Bridge (former)
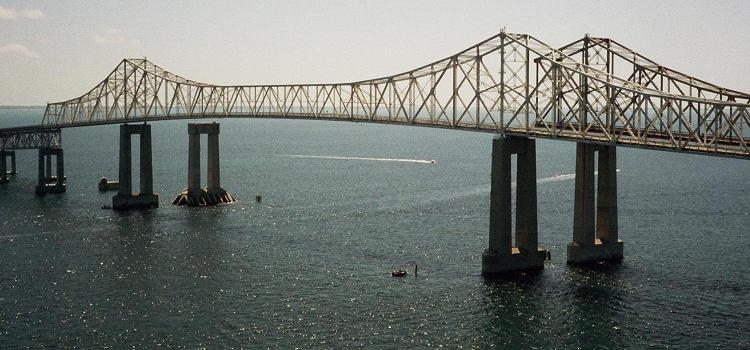
- Coordinates: 27°37′30″N 82°39′31″W
- Carried: 4 lanes of US 19 (as two separate 2-lane bridges, one for each direction)

Characteristics
- Design: Cantilever bridge
- Material: Steel
- Trough construction: Steel
- Pier construction: Reinforced concrete

History
- Engineering design by: Parsons, Brinckerhoff, Hall and MacDonald
- Constructed by: Virginia Bridge Company
- Construction start: October 19, 1950 (original bridge, later converted to northbound only traffic) (Note: Reverted to two-way traffic in 1980 with the bridge collapse.); 1967 (southbound span)
- Construction end: 1954 (northbound span); 1971 (southbound span)
- Construction cost: $22,250,000 (original bridge)
- Opened: September 6, 1954; 72 years ago (original bridge)
- Inaugurated: September 6, 1954
- Collapsed: May 9, 1980; 46 years ago (southbound)
- Closed: April 20, 1987; 39 years ago (northbound original span, closed as two way)
- Replaced: Bee Line Ferry
- Replaced by: Bob Graham Sunshine Skyway Bridge

The Sunshine Skyway Bridge, officially referred to as the Bob Graham Sunshine Skyway Bridge, is a pair of long beam bridges with a central tall cable-stayed bridge. It spans Lower Tampa Bay to connect Pinellas County (St. Petersburg, Florida) to Manatee County (Terra Ceia, Florida). The current Sunshine Skyway opened in 1987 and is the second bridge of that name on the site. It was designed by the Figg & Muller Engineering Group and built by the American Bridge Company. The bridge is considered the flagship bridge of Florida and serves as a gateway to Tampa Bay. The four-lane bridge carries Interstate 275 and U.S. Route 19, passing through Pinellas County, Hillsborough County and Manatee County. It is a toll bridge, with a toll assessed on two-axle vehicles traveling in either direction at a rate of $1.75 with the state's toll by plate system or $1.16 with the state's SunPass system.

The original Sunshine Skyway was a two-lane beam bridge with a central truss bridge built directly to the west of the current structure. It was completed in 1954, and a second two-lane span opened in 1971. The original bridge was the site of two major maritime disasters in 1980, the second of which resulted in its partial destruction. The first incident was on the night of January 28, when the United States Coast Guard cutter Blackthorn collided with the tanker Capricorn in the western approach to the bridge, resulting in the sinking of the cutter with the loss of 23 crew members in the worst peacetime disaster in the history of the U.S. Coast Guard. The second incident came on the morning of May 9, 1980, when the freighter MV Summit Venture allided with a support pier near the center of the bridge during a squall, resulting in the catastrophic failure of the southbound roadway and the deaths of 35 people when several vehicles, including a Greyhound bus, plunged into Tampa Bay. Traffic was diverted onto the surviving two-lane span for several years until the replacement Skyway Bridge was completed, at which time the old bridge was partially demolished and converted into two long fishing piers.

The channel beneath the main span of the Skyway allows access to Port Tampa Bay, Port Tampa, the Port of St. Petersburg, and SeaPort Manatee, making it one of the busiest shipping lanes in the United States. Owing to the 1980 disaster, the current bridge incorporates numerous safety features to protect the structure from ship collisions.

== History ==
=== Precursors and proposals ===
In 1924, J.G. "Jim" Foley, a realtor, and his partner Charles R. Carter joined with James E. Bussey, an attorney, to create the Bee Line Ferry Company. The service started on March 7, 1927, and originally had two ferries: Fred D. Doty and the City of Wilmington (later renamed Pinellas). The ferry crossed from the end of Bay Vista Park in St. Petersburg to Piney Point, a region north of Palmetto.

A physiotherapist from St. Petersburg named Herman Simmonds proposed building a high-level suspension bridge in 1926. Sometime during 1927, Simmonds received congressional approval and a permit from the US War Department to build a bridge, but efforts were put on hold due to the Great Depression.

In 1929, the Florida Legislature gave the Bee Line Ferry a 50-year franchise to operate a service between Pinellas and Manatee Counties. The service gradually expanded during the 1930s, and by the end of the decade, Bee Line operated four boats which departed every 30 minutes in the winter and every 45 minutes in the summer during daylight hours, weather permitting. During its last full year of operation in 1941, Bee Line carried almost 100,000 vehicles and thousands of passengers. Ferries stopped running in 1942 when many employees were called to serve and the boats were converted to military use as part of the World War II war effort. In 1944, the St. Petersburg Port Authority bought the franchise from Bee Lee and resumed ferry service, albeit on a smaller scale until the end of the war. Regular ferry service would continue until the Sunshine Skyway Bridge opened a decade later.

During the same period, several preliminary proposals were made to build a tunnel or a series of bridges across the mouth of Tampa Bay. In 1929, a bill was introduced in the Florida legislature to build a tunnel crossing lower Tampa Bay running from Pinellas Point to Piney Point, with the tunnel itself being buried 40 ft (12 m) under the bay and going for a length of 1,000 ft (300 m). This proposal did not get past the early planning stages because construction costs would be high, and unspecified "Tampa officials" argued that building any bridge or tunnel would pose a navigational hazard.

Another proposal soon originated from Louis E. Saupe, head of the West Coast Bridge and Tunnel Company. This consisted of a series of short causeways running from Maximo Point to Mullet Key on the Pinellas County side, a tunnel running for less than 1/2 mile (0.80 km) beneath the shipping lane near the mouth of the bay, and another causeway running to Terra Ceia on the Manatee County side. State officials preliminarily approved the project in 1939, and the state legislature agreed to fund it. The project was designed to cross through a portion of Hillsborough County near the mouth of Tampa Bay. Since the county was not mentioned in legislation, the bill was declared unconstitutional, and the project stalled.

Bail, Horton, and Associates, along with Parsons, Brinckerhoff, Hogan & Macdonald, received a contract from the port authority on December 20, 1944, to design the bridge. Both firms released a report in November 1945 about the bridge. Freeman Horton of Bail, Horton and Associates proposed Snead Island as its southern terminus and 10th Street in Palmetto as the thoroughfare. Bail, Horton, and Associates was awarded the contract but as it was unable to get $10 million in revenue bonds, the state government halted the project sometime during the late 1940s. The design competition was reactivated in the early 1950s, with Parsons, Brinckerhoff, Hogan & Macdonald winning the contract this time and serving as the engineers for both design and construction. The partner-in-charge for Brinckerhoff was M. N. Quade. The successful attempt to build the bridge came after the Florida State Improvement Commission was approached with a proposal that they finance it while the State Road Department (SRD) built it. The Florida State Improvement Commission proceeded to take over the St. Petersburg Port Authority's assets, which included $520,000 seen with bonded indebtedness. A $21,250,000 bond issue was passed by the Improvement Commission, and sales started after the Port Authority's assets were acquired.

==== Naming the bridge ====
On July 4, 1950, a day-long "Spans Across the Bay" festival was held in St. Petersburg to celebrate the approval of the long-awaited bridge and to announce its name. The St. Pete Junior Chamber of Commerce and the Florida State Road Department had conducted a nationwide contest to name the structure, with the rules dictating that it should not be named after a specific person or geographic place. Over 20,000 entries were submitted, and Virginia Seymore of nearby Indian Rocks Beach was announced as the winner for her submission of Sunshine Skyway.

=== Construction of original bridge ===
Construction bids were accepted in July 1950 and construction began on October 19, 1950, with 544 workers. It was built by the Virginia Bridge Company and another firm that was involved doing engineering work was Parsons, Brinckerhoff, Hall and McDonald. Staging areas for the construction of the bridge were established at both crossing sites. An entire concrete factory was established near Piney Point while prefabricated concrete parts were delivered via barge from a site in Tampa where they were made. 4,100,000 cubic yards (3,100,000 m^{3}) of material was dredged as part of building the causeways for the bridge. 12,104,000 lb (5,490 t) of structural steel, 8,536,700 lb (3,872 t) of rebar and 115,980 cubic yards (88,670 m^{3}) of concrete were used to build the bridge.

=== Original bridge ===
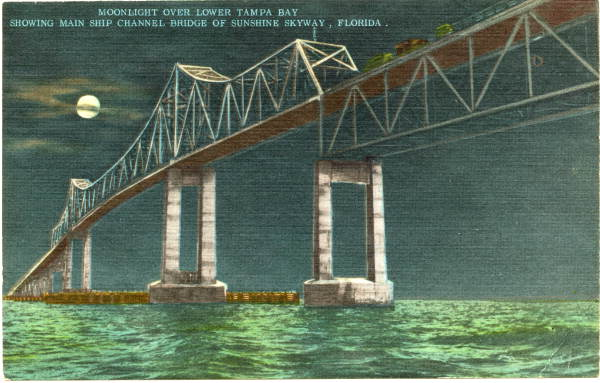
A postcard depicting the original Sunshine Skyway Bridge

The two-lane bridge opened to traffic on September 6, 1954. At the time of the bridge's opening it was among the longest bridges on Earth and it was the longest continuous bridge in the United States. Notable participants in opening ceremonies that day were: US senator and former governor Spessard Holland, former governors Charley E. Johns and Fuller Warren along with James Melton and General James Van Fleet. Delegations from ten Florida counties participated that day. On the day the original bridge opened, it was toll free from 11 a.m. to 11 p.m. A reported 15,086 cars crossed the bridge on its first day.

The bridge's central span was 22,373 ft (6,819 m) long with a 864 ft (263 m) opening for a ship channel. It consisted of 32 concrete piers set every 135 ft (41 m), except at the ship channel, and the bridge rose at a 5% grade. The original maximum speed limit was 45 mph (72 km/h), and the minimum was 35 mph (56 km/h). The lack of illumination made the bridge dark at night. The bridge was not easily accessible, however, and drivers often had to take detours to reach it. U.S. Route 19's final segment, which ended at the Sunshine Skyway Bridge, opened on July 19, 1955.

=== Second span ===
The original spans of the Sunshine Skyway Bridge, between 1971 and 1980.

In 1969, a second two-lane span was built beside the original to ease traffic and bring the bridge up to Interstate Highway standards. On August 31, 1970, the bridge was struck by the Liberty ship Jacob S. Mansfield, which was being towed from Mobile, Alabama to shipbreakers in Tampa, Florida. Opening of the newer span was delayed until 1971 for reinforcing the south main pier, which had cracked due to insufficient supporting pile depth. It was dedicated on May 19, 1971. Both Governor Reubin Askew and the mayor of Bradenton, B.T. Arbuckle, attended the second span's dedication. The second span was used for all southbound traffic, while the original span was converted to carry only northbound traffic.

=== 1980 collapse ===
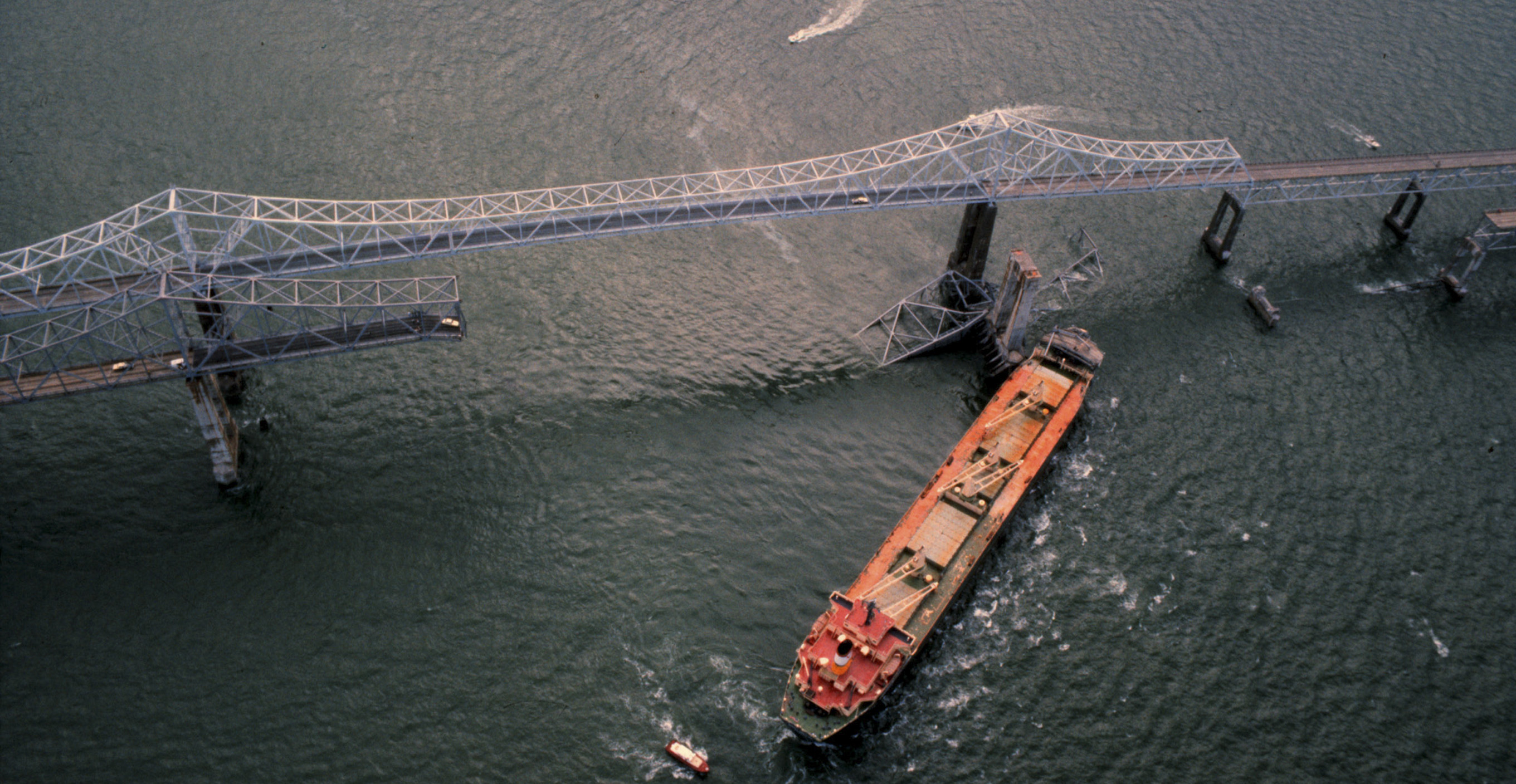
An aerial view of the collapsed bridge and MV Summit Venture on May 9, 1980

The southbound span (opened in 1971) of the original bridge was destroyed on the morning of May 9, 1980, when the 606 ft (185 m) freighter MV Summit Venture collided with a support column during a sudden rain squall, causing the catastrophic failure of over 1,200 ft (370 m) of the span.

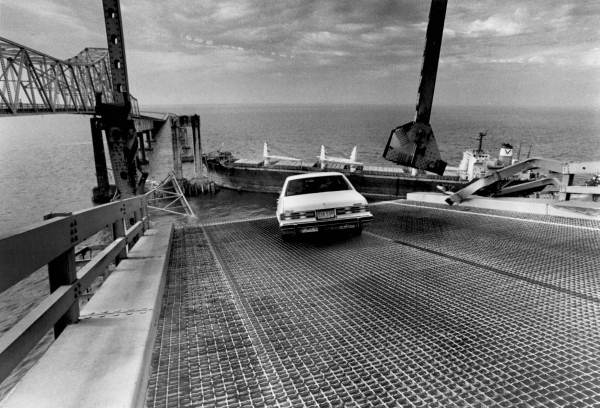
Richard Hornbuckle's Buick Skylark stopped just short of the collapsed portion of the bridge

Several vehicles were at the top of the bridge when almost a quarter-mile of roadway fell away beneath them, while others drove off the edge, either because the drivers did not notice the collapse in the driving rain or could not stop quickly enough in the wet conditions. In all, six cars, a truck, and a Greyhound bus plummeted 150 ft (46 m) into Tampa Bay, resulting in 35 deaths. A few drivers, including former Major League Baseball player Granny Hamner, were able to stop their vehicles before reaching the gap, and as seen in many photographs of the aftermath, a Buick Skylark driven by local car dealer Richard Hornbuckle skidded to a halt just two feet from the chasm.

MV Summit Venture collision incident mayday call (audio)

In the water below, several small official and private boats and a transportation department diving team arrived soon after the intense but narrow squall line cleared the vicinity. However, the frantic rescue effort became a recovery operation, as only the victims' bodies were found. The only survivor of the fall was Wesley MacIntire, whose Ford Courier pickup truck had bounced off the hull of the Summit Venture and into the water. The truck sank to the shallow bottom of the bay, but MacIntire managed to escape and swim to the surface, where he was quickly pulled to safety aboard the freighter. He sued the company that owned the ship and won a $175,000 settlement in 1984 ($542,000 today).

John Lerro, the veteran harbor pilot who was steering the ship at the time of the accident, was cleared of wrongdoing by both a state grand jury and a Coast Guard investigation. The investigations concluded that the inbound freighter had been in the process of maneuvering into the narrow channel under the center of the bridge when a microburst containing sudden torrential rains and 70 mph (110 km/h) winds cut visibility to near zero and temporarily rendered the ship's radar useless. Lerro put the ship's engines into full reverse and ordered the emergency dropping of the anchor when he realized that the freighter had left the channel, but the forward momentum of the 20,000-ton ship along with strong winds from astern pushed the bow into support beams to the right of the shipping lane. While the main support pier nearest to the channel withstood the strike with only minor damage, a secondary support pier just to the south was not designed to withstand such an impact and failed catastrophically, causing the entire center of the southbound span to collapse at 7:38 a.m.

=== Replacement bridge ===
View of the current bridge (foreground) and the old bridges shortly after the opening of the new span to traffic in 1987.

Soon after the disaster, the undamaged northbound span was converted back to a two-lane, two-way bridge while the state of Florida considered proposals for a replacement. Ideas included the construction of a tunnel (which was deemed impractical due to Florida's high water table) and a simple reconstruction of the broken section of the old bridge, which would not widen the narrow shipping lane. Governor Bob Graham's idea to build a "signature" cable-stayed bridge with a span that would be 50% wider than that of the old Skyway Bridge won out over other proposals. In addition to a wider shipping lane, the channel would be marked by a 1/4 mi (400 m)-long series of large concrete barriers, and the support piers would be protected by massive concrete "dolphins".

Construction began in January 1983 with the pounding of pilings for the foundation, and work on the main piers began the following September. The complicated project was delayed several times by bad weather and various difficulties in construction, and the planned opening was pushed back several times. Finally, the opening ceremony was set for April 30, 1987. However, on April 29 at about 3:30 p.m., the new bridge's protective bumpers were hit head-on by the Deliverance, a 74-foot (23 m) shrimp boat. The bumper sustained minor damage and the bridge was not affected, but the vessel took on water and was towed out of the channel into shallow waters, where it promptly sank. The opening ceremonies proceeded as scheduled.

=== Demolition of former bridge ===
In 1990, the FDOT awarded a bid to Hardaway Company (owner of Controlled Demolition, Inc.) to demolish all steel and concrete sections of the older Sunshine Skyway spans. The scope of the project required that all underwater piles and piers, and surface roadway, girders, and beams, be dismantled. Special care had to be taken in removing underwater bridge elements near the channel, and the central portion of the original bridge had to be removed in one piece to minimize closure of the only approach to the busy Port of Tampa. Most of the concrete material was used to create an artificial reef near the southbound approach of the old bridge, which was converted into a long pier for newly created Skyway Fishing Pier State Park. Unused approaches to the original spans were demolished in 2008.

Wesley MacIntire, the only motorist survivor of the collapse, was the last person to drive over the intact original span before it was demolished. Accompanied by his wife, he stopped at the apex of the bridge and dropped 35 white carnations into the water, one for each person who died in the disaster.

== Issues and concerns ==
=== Suicides ===
At least 316 people have died by suicide by jumping from the bridge or its predecessors into the waters of Tampa Bay. An estimated 48 others have survived. Many other missing persons are suspected of having jumped from the bridge, but their deaths could not be confirmed, as no bodies were recovered.

Florida installed six crisis hotline phones along the center span in 1999 and began 24-hour patrols. As of 2003, the call center at the Crisis Center of Tampa Bay received 18 calls from potential jumpers, all of whom survived, according to a 2003 St. Petersburg Times report. The bridge saw an average of one jump per month, reaching a record high of 18 suicides in 2018.

In 2006, a feature film, Loren Cass, depicted a suicide jump off the Sunshine Skyway. Two years later, Sean Michael Davis of Rhino Productions was inspired by his haunting experience witnessing a woman get out of her car and immediately jump off the bridge before anyone could intervene to create a not-for-profit film titled Skyway Down. His objectives were to deter other potential jumpers by "'punch[ing] them in the face' with interviews with survivors and family members", to give them "hope and to try to de-glorify the romanticism of the bridge", in part by informing those who have "mulled a leap to know about the bloody, battered aftermath."

In 2020, the FDOT installed the Skyway Vertical Net, a vertical fence designed to deter suicide attempts. The fencing was placed atop the bridge's waist-high concrete barriers, creating an overall "wall" almost 11 ft (3.4 m) tall which runs for about 1.5 miles (2.4 km) along the highest portions of the bridge. The fence is designed to dissuade potential jumpers or at least slow them down long enough that law enforcement officials can reach them. The number of jumpers has been drastically reduced since the project's completion in June 2021, with only five reported over the ensuing 29 months.

As on any controlled-access highway in Florida, pedestrians and bicycles are prohibited. Stopping on the bridge for any nonemergency, including sightseeing, is prohibited. Traffic on the bridge is monitored by the Florida Highway Patrol, and any bicyclist, pedestrian, or stopped vehicle triggers a police dispatch.

=== Corrosion ===
A major problem with the Sunshine Skyway Bridge is corrosion of the steel in the precast concrete segmental columns on the high-level approaches. Because the segments are hollow, workers were able to enter the bridge superstructure in 2003 and 2004 to reinforce the corroded sections of the bridge, ensuring its future safety. Another problem arose around 2005–06 when several news bureaus reported paint discolorations on the bridge's cables. These paint splotches and patches were the result of touch-ups performed sometime in 1998, but began to show through after using newer, environmentally safe paint. The change in the paint's composition caused it to fade faster than expected.

From 2006 to 2008, FDOT hired a contractor to perform the first full repainting of the bridge since it opened in 1987. The work included repainting the bridge's 42 steel cables in a single shade of yellow and rehabilitating the lighting system at the summit of the bridge. In 2022–2023, the yellow steel cables were repainted, and corrosion protection was added to the ship impact system on each side of the channel.

=== Low clearance ===
A 2014 FDOT study noted that the Skyway's low bridge clearance prevented larger vessels from using the Port Tampa Bay terminals, but made no recommendation about options, as the air draft of most new cruise ships exceeds the bridge's height limit at 180 ft (55 m). As long ago as 2000, cruise ship manufacturers have had to make special modifications for ships destined for Tampa, and newer classes of cruise ships such as the Oasis class, which has a height of 236 ft (72 m), far exceed the bridge clearance.

SSA Marine proposed a plan in January 2026 for a new cruise port at Rattlesnake Key in Manatee County, near Terra Ceia Preserve. The Skyway's low clearance was one of the main reasons for the proposal. The Florida Senate introduced Senate Bill 302 on January 13, 2026 which was amended in the following month to include language that prevents dredging or filling of the submerged lands of the Terra Ceia Aquatic Preserve. The bill was signed into law by Florida Governor Ron DeSantis on March 19, 2026.

== Traffic ==
=== Usage and tourism ===
The former and current bridges have been featured in various forms of media. The original Sunshine Skyway Bridge is featured in Yours Truly, Johnny Dollar and the opening credits to Superboy. The current bridge has provided the setting for several films, such as Loren Cass and The Punisher. The bridge also served as plot devices to various novels such as Dennis Lehane's 1997 novel Sacred and Ben Bova's 2005 novel Powersat. The bridge is also the subject of the song "Skyway Avenue" by We the Kings. The current bridge is also a popular filming location for car commercials.

The United States Postal Service featured the bridge on a Priority Mail postage stamp in 2012. Carl T. Hermann worked on the painting and the digital illustration was created by artist Dan Cosgrove.

In 2005, an act of the Florida Legislature officially named the current bridge the Bob Graham Sunshine Skyway Bridge, after the former governor of Florida and then-U.S. Senator who presided over its design and most of its construction. He was reportedly inspired to propose the current design by a visit to France, where he saw a similar cable-stayed bridge, the Brotonne Bridge. The original bridge was dedicated to state engineer William E. Dean.

In November 2017, work began on installing decorative lighting on the skyway's columns, main spans, and sloped spans. The $15.6 million lighting project provides a visual aesthetic while also enhancing safety and security by providing more light to the underside of the bridge from dusk to dawn. Over 1,800 light-emitting diodes were installed along 1.7 miles (2.7 km) of the bridge, which cycle through animated routines. The lighting project was completed in October 2019 and funded by FDOT through collected toll fees.

Tollbooths were utilized for bridge toll collection until FDOT converted them to all electronic tolling in April 2026. TTEC laid off 57 employees in St. Petersburg as a result of the conversion.

=== Skyway 10K ===
On January 11, 1987, the Skyway Bridge opened to 10,000 runners, joggers, and walkers before opening to motor-vehicle traffic the following week. Runners participated in four races that ran simultaneously across the bridge, with two races southbound and two northbound. Publicity and posters for the race referred to it by the humorous title "20,000 Feet Above the Sea", a reference to the 1870 Jules Verne novel Twenty Thousand Leagues Under the Seas.

The inaugural Skyway 10K began in 2018. On March 4, 2018, in partnership with the Armed Forces Families Foundation, the Skyway Bridge was closed for the Inaugural Skyway 10K. The Skyway 10K has been held annually since 2018, except for 2021 and 2025. The events were held virtually due to the COVID-19 pandemic in 2021, and the race's staging spot at Tropicana Field suffered damage from Hurricane Milton in October 2024 to make it not possible to use in 2025.

== Gallery ==
=== Old bridge demolition ===
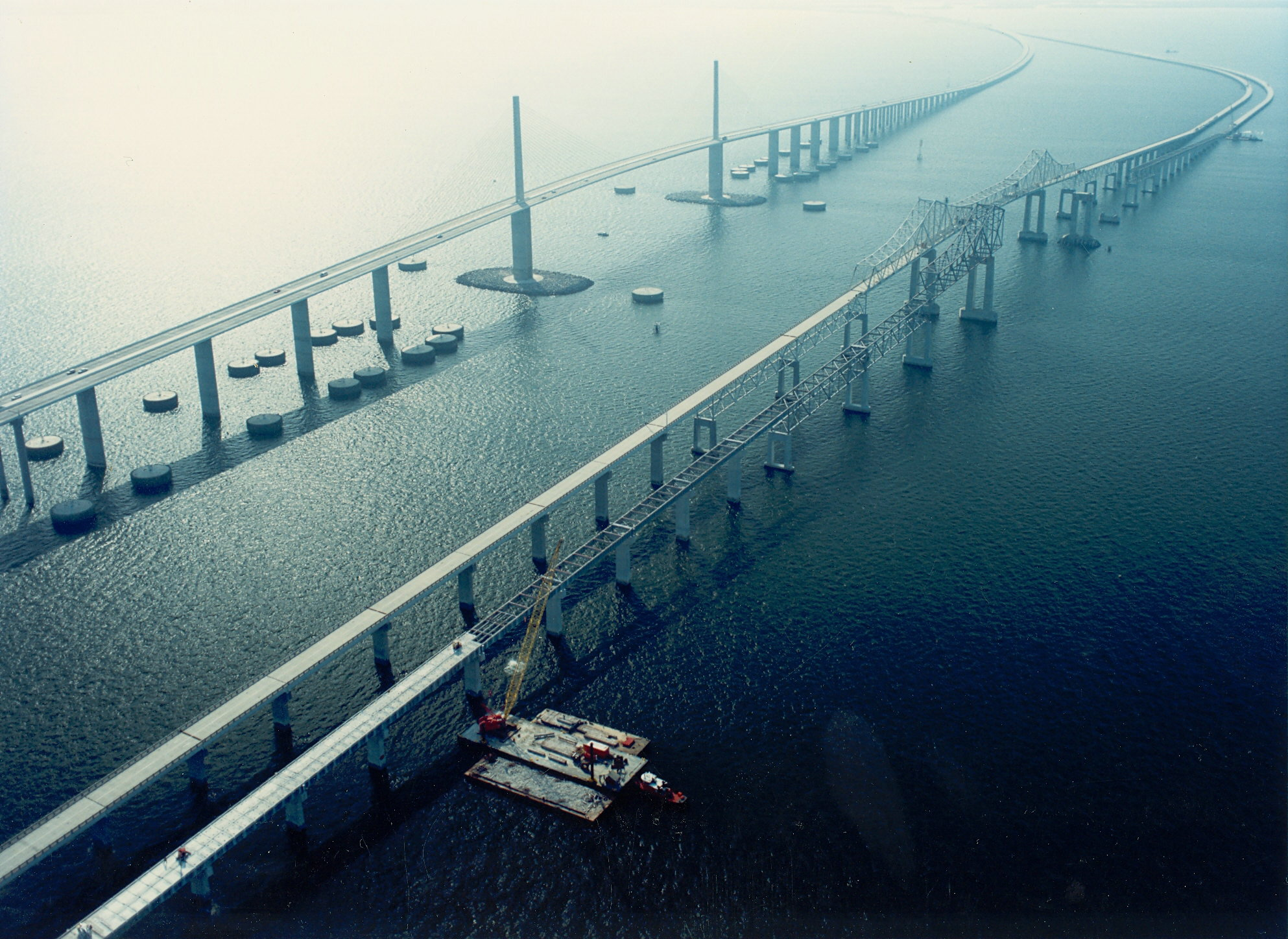
View of the current bridge (top) and the old bridges: The piers of the current bridge are protected by structural dolphins. The collapsed bridge is under demolition.

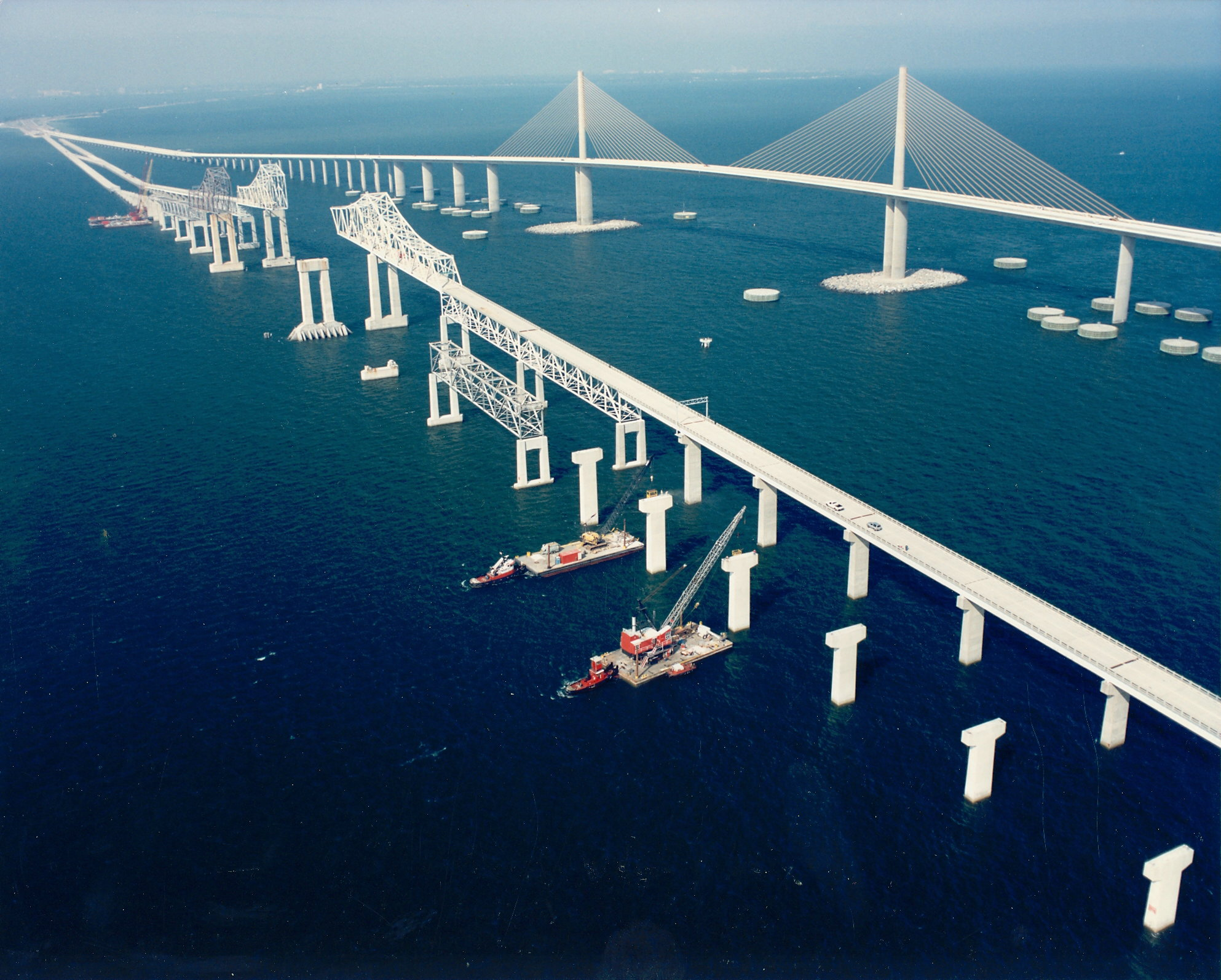
Demolition of steel and concrete girders: The truncated pier visible was the one struck by Summit Venture.

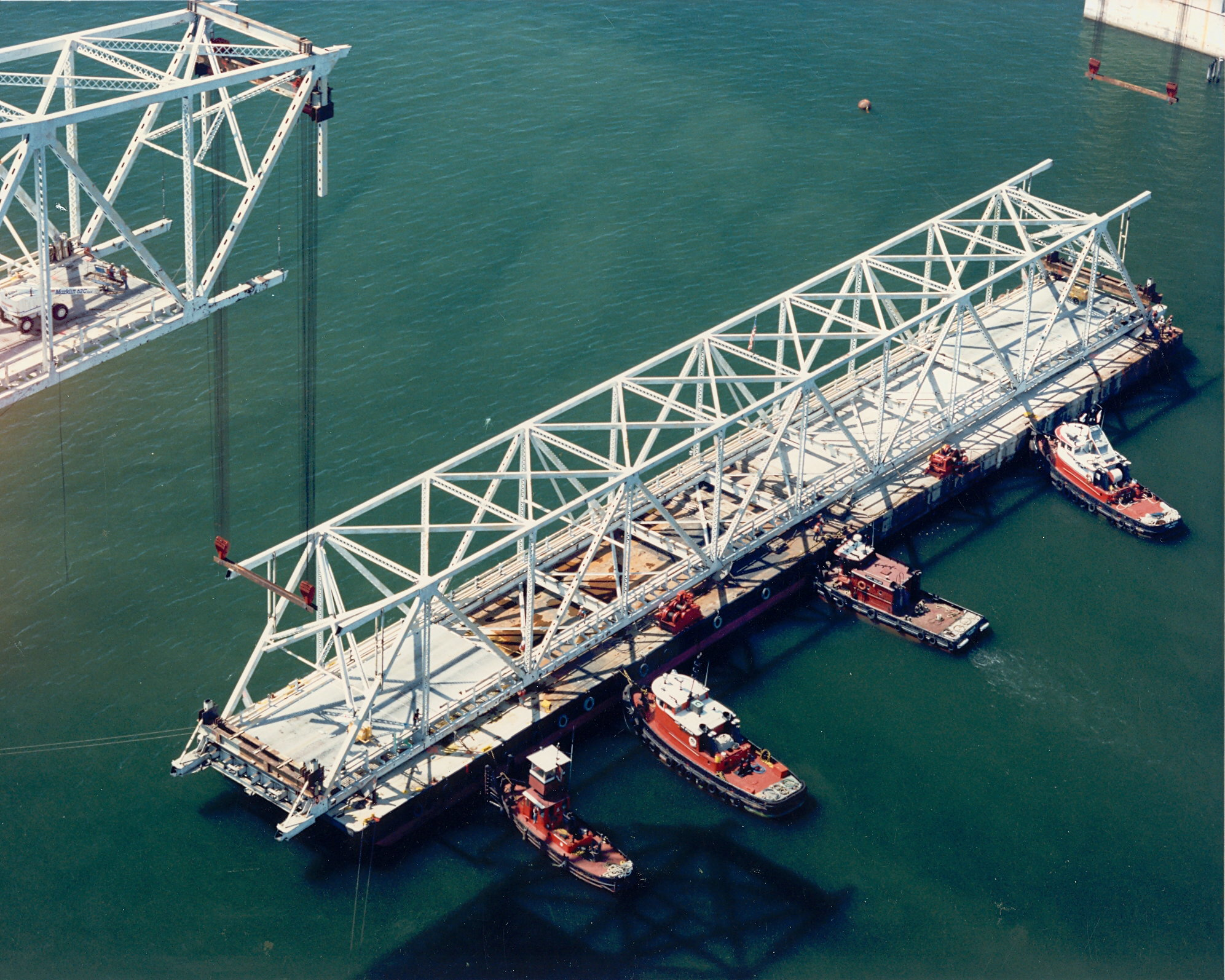
Main bridge span (secured on barge) being towed away

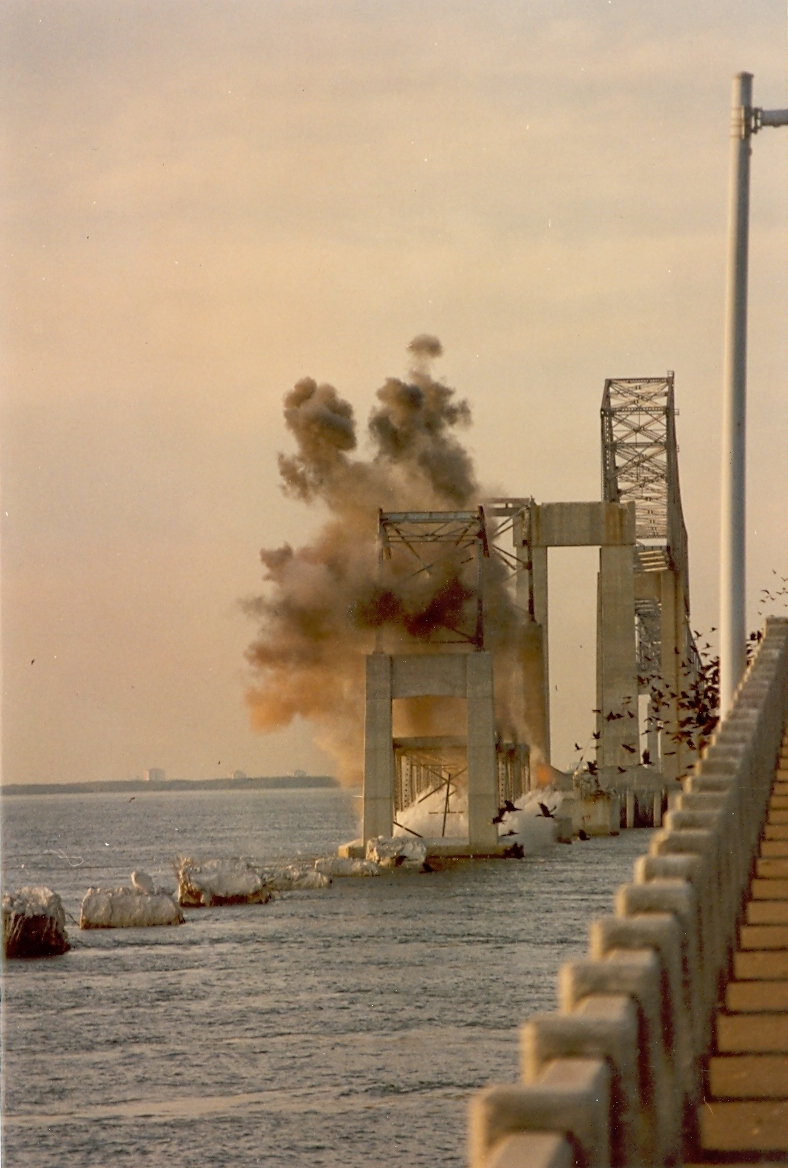
Blasting steel truss

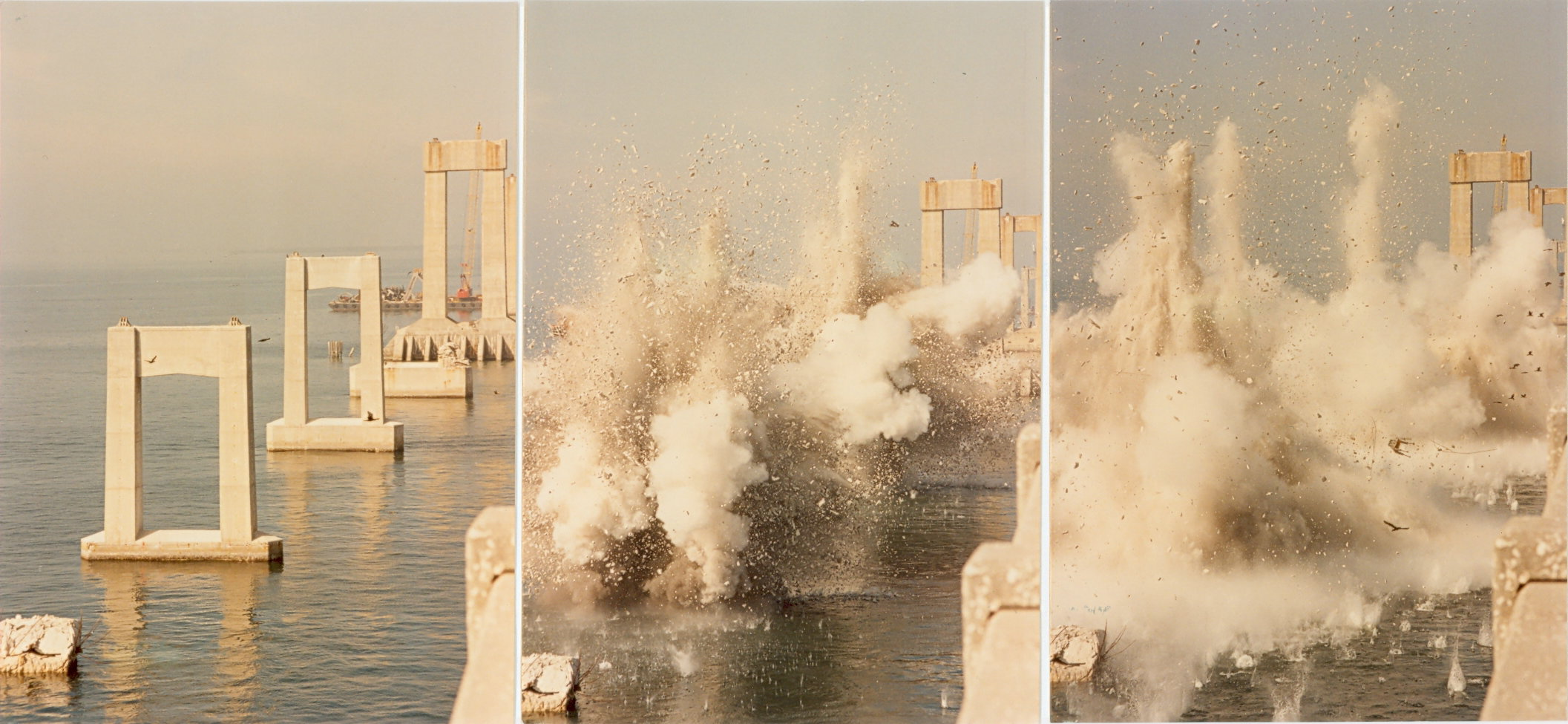
Blasting concrete piers

=== Current bridge ===
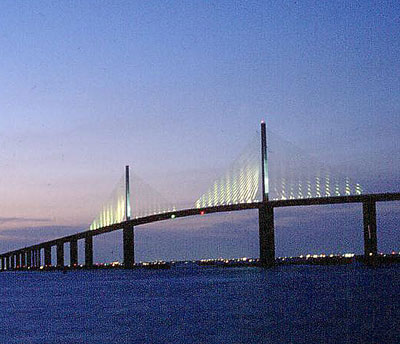
The bridge at twilight

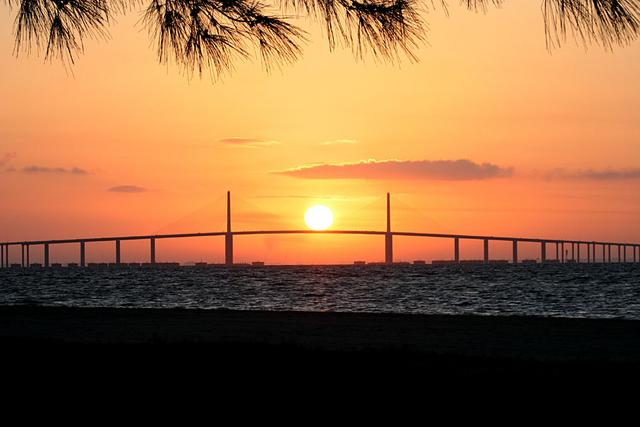
View of bridge from Fort De Soto Park

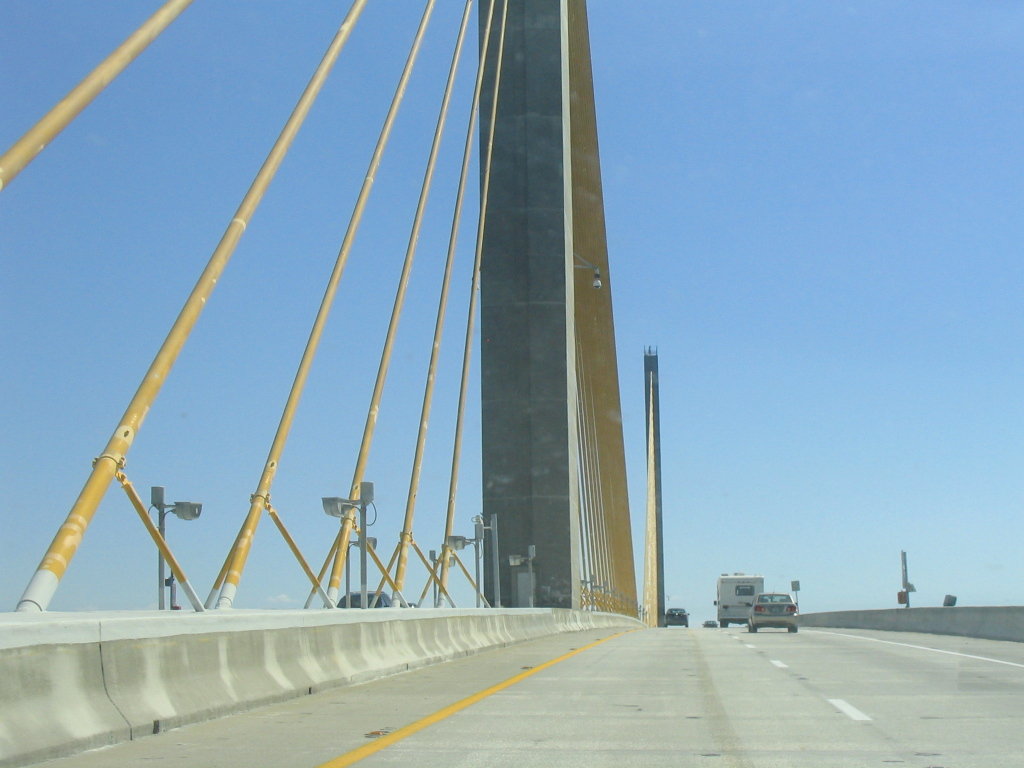
Driving on the bridge, near the peak

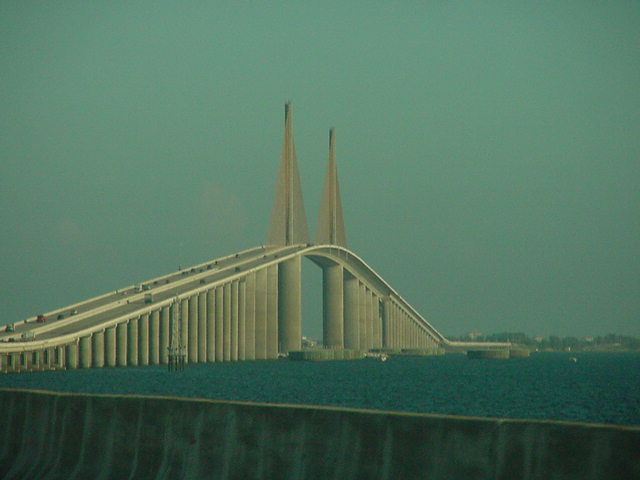
View of bridge heading south

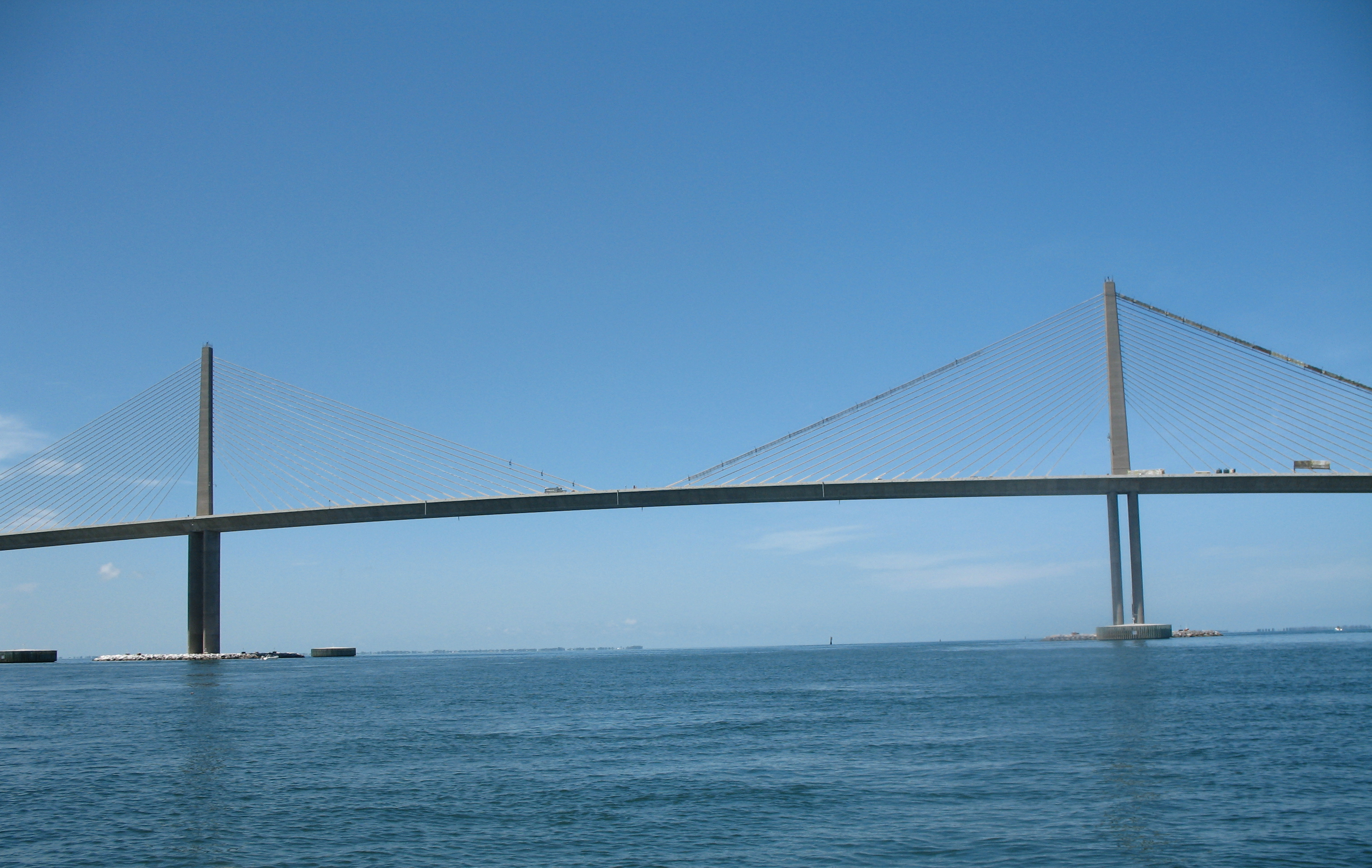
View from Tampa Bay

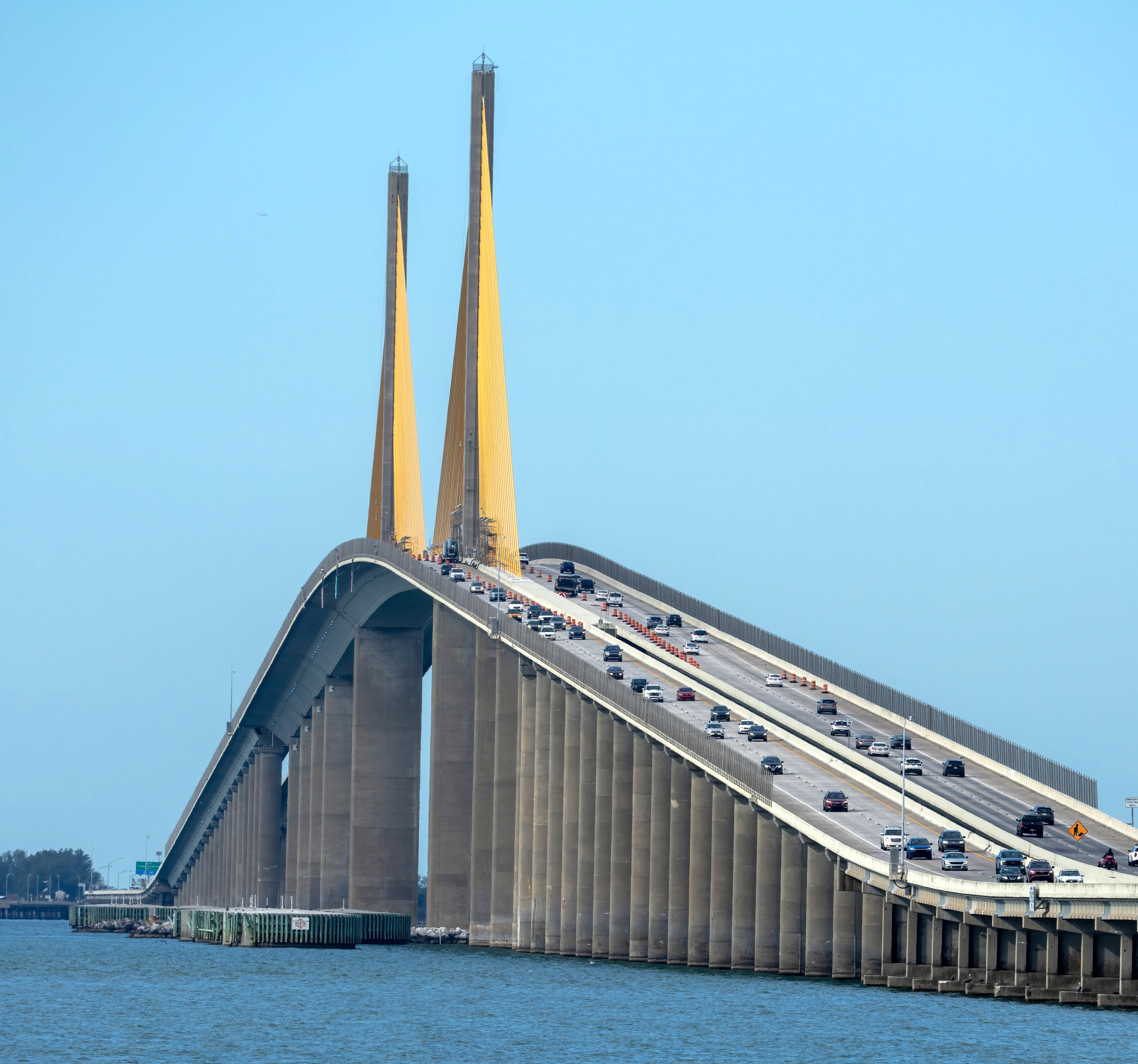
2023

== See also ==
- Dames Point Bridge
- Francis Scott Key Bridge collapse, bridge collapse in 2024 under similar circumstances to the 1980 bridge collapse
- List of bridge failures
- List of bridges in Florida
- Millau Viaduct, a bridge with a similar design in France
- Tasman Bridge disaster, bridge collapse in 1975 under similar circumstances to the Sunshine Skyway Bridge collapse
