= Crisis Center of Tampa Bay =

U.S. nonprofit organization

- Formation: 1972
- Location(s): One Crisis Center Plaza; Tampa, Florida 33613
- CEO: Clara Reynolds
- Website: CrisisCenter.com

The Crisis Center of Tampa Bay is a private nonprofit organization in Tampa, Florida, that provides services and support for a variety of crisis situations including sexual assault, sexual abuse, domestic violence, financial distress, substance abuse, medical emergency, or suicidal thoughts.

== History ==
The Crisis Center of Tampa Bay is a private nonprofit organization in Tampa, Florida that provides 211 services to Hillsborough county. The 211 number is designated to connect people to essential resources local to them and can range from suicide prevention and trauma support to assistance with paying utility bills.

It was formed from the mergers of previous non-profit organizations including the Suicide and Crisis Hotline (established in 1972), the Sexual Abuse Treatment Center (incorporated in 1974), and the Hillsborough County Crisis Center (incorporated in 1978). In 1999 the organization rebranded as the Crisis Center of Tampa Bay. Clara Reynolds is the current CEO of the Crisis Center of Tampa Bay. The Crisis Center of Tampa Bay is consistently rated as one of the top places to work in Tampa. The Crisis Center of Tampa Bay serves about 350 sexual assault survivors every year and in each case also provides survivors a set of new clothes.

In 2023, the Crisis Center of Tampa Bay launched an emergency medical technician (EMT) apprenticeship with classroom instruction provided by Ultimate Medical Academy. Through the program, apprentices earn an Emergency Medical Technician diploma from UMA and sit for the National Registry of Emergency Medical Technicians exam.

In 2025, the Crisis Center partnered with Success for Kids & Families to provide long-term emotional and behavioral counseling to children and their families with the goal of keeping children in their communities and not in a mental health institution.

== Services ==
The Crisis Center of Tampa Bay offers various services to the community. The holiday periods see an increased need for services.

- TransCare, provides primary 911 Basic Life Support services in Tampa and countywide psychiatric transports to area hospitals
- Corbett Trauma Center, care coordination, and trauma therapy
- Suicide and Crisis Hotline, staff available to listen and initiate emergency rescue if necessary
- Rape Hotline, counselors help people manage emotions and make plans to deal with their situation after the trauma of sexual assault
- Substance Abuse Hotline, counselors provide options to individuals and families affected by addiction
- 211 at your fingertips, a resource database for community members to search for services
- Florida Veterans Support Line
- Success 4 Kids & Families, emotional and behavioral counseling for children and their families
