= MV Summit Venture =

Bulk carrier merchant ship

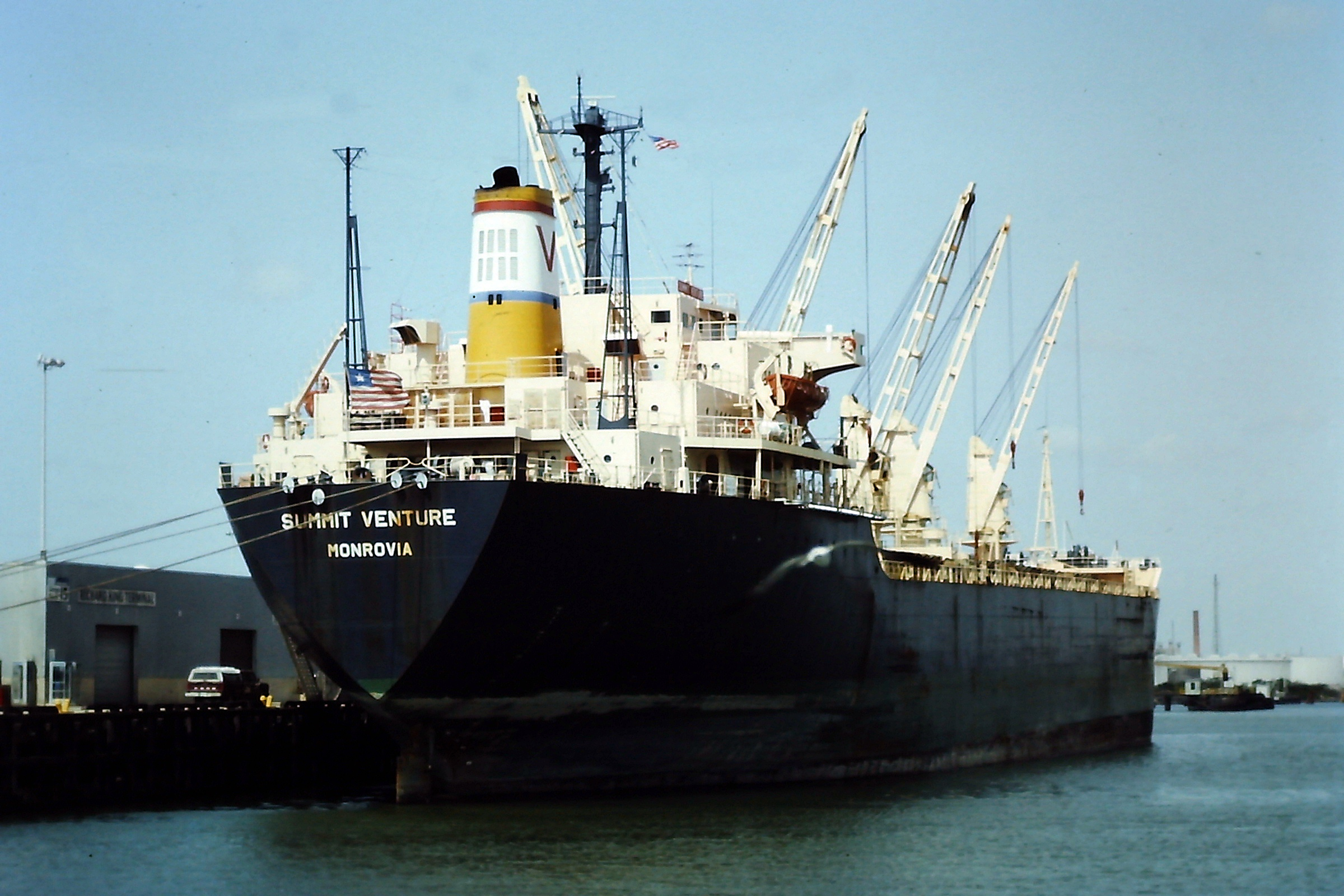
- Summit Venture at Corpus Christi

History
- Name: 1976–1993 Summit Venture; 1993–1996 Sailor; 1996–2004 Sailor I; 2004–2008 KS Harmony; 2008–2010 Jianmao 9
- Owner: 1976-1993 Hercules Carriers; 1993–2008 various; 2008–2010 Jian Xing International
- Port of registry: 1976–1993 (Liberia) Monrovia; 1993–1998 (Malta) Valletta; 1998–2010 Panama
- Builder: Oshima Shipbuilding, Ōshima
- Yard number: 10006
- Laid down: August 8, 1976
- Launched: May 18, 1976
- Completed: August 26, 1976
- Identification: IMO number: 7518915
- Fate: Sank November 9, 2010

General characteristics
- Type: Bulk carrier
- Tonnage: 19,734 GT; 33,912 DWT
- Length: 185.5 m (608.6 ft) oa; 175.0 m (574.1 ft) pp
- Beam: 26.1 m (85.6 ft)
- Height: 15.5 m (50.9 ft)
- Propulsion: 1 screw; Diesel engine

MV Summit Venture was a Japanese-built bulk carrier, built in 1976, which collided with the Sunshine Skyway Bridge in 1980, causing the partial collapse of the bridge, which killed 35 people.

The ship was repaired and returned to service and was subsequently resold, trading as Sailor, Sailor I, KS Harmony and Jianmao 9. She sank off the Vietnamese coast in November 2010 when the holds took in water.

== Building and delivery ==
Summit Venture was a bulk carrier built in 1976 by Oshima Shipbuilding of Nagasaki, Japan, as Yard Number 10006. Her length overall was 609 feet (186 m) long, breadth 85.5 feet (26.1 m), depth 50.9 feet (15.5 m) and draft 36.5 feet (11.1 m); the ship's gross tonnage was 19,735, net tonnage 13,948 and deadweight tonnage 33,912. Summit Venture was propelled by a 11,550 bhp (8,610 kW) diesel engine of Sulzer design, made in Japan by Sumitomo Heavy Industries and driving a single screw.

Launched on May 18, 1976, the ship was completed on August 26 that year for Hercules Carriers Inc of Liberia, where she was also registered. Venture Shipping (Managers) Ltd of Hong Kong were the ship's operators.

== 1980 Skyway Bridge incident ==
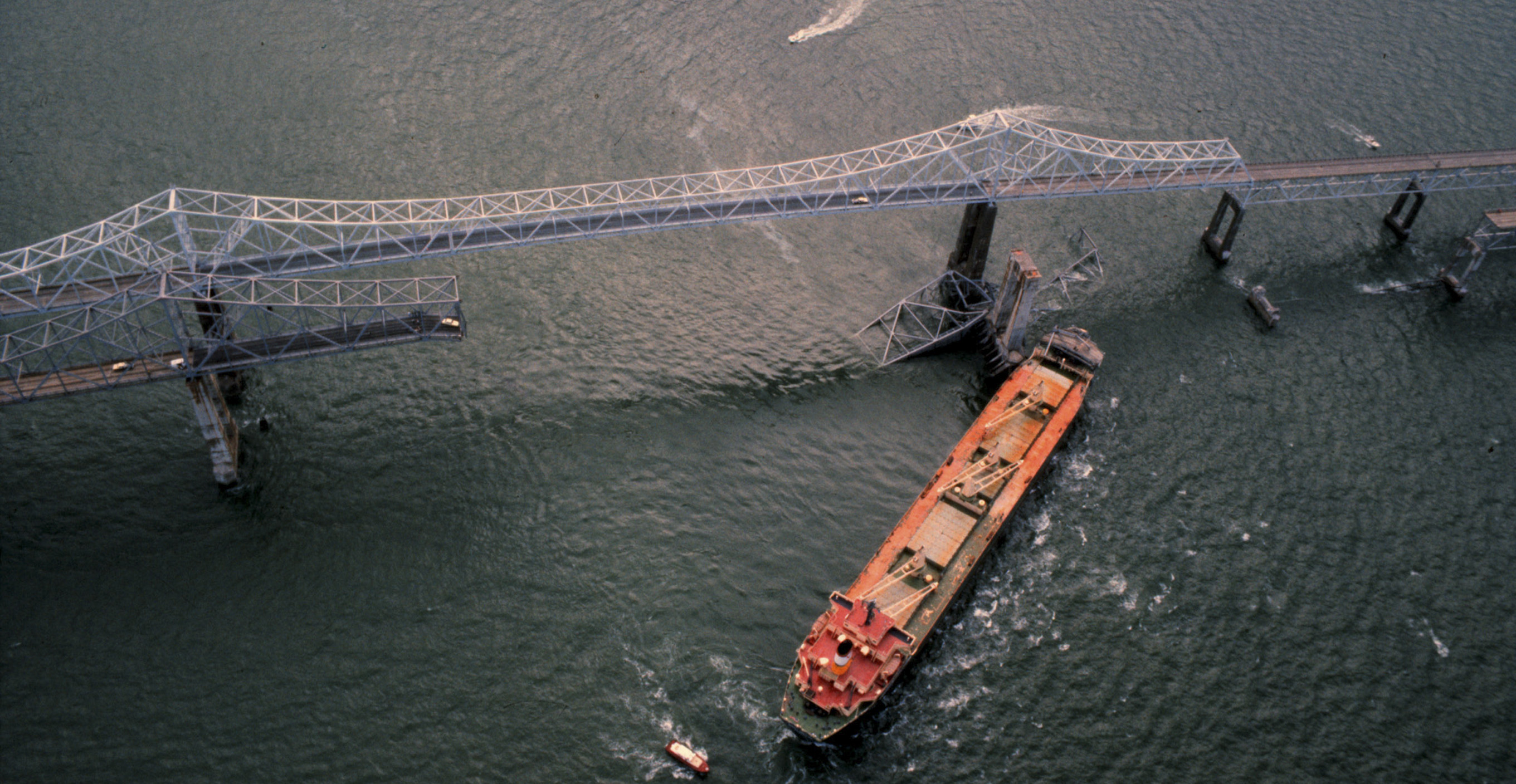
An aerial view of the collapsed bridge and Summit Venture on May 9, 1980

Summit Venture was involved in a fatal collision with the original Sunshine Skyway Bridge in Tampa Bay, Florida in the morning of May 9, 1980. Inward bound in ballast for the Port of Tampa under compulsory pilotage, while negotiating a required turn in the narrow channel in stormy weather, with heavy rain and squalls, the radar failed during a squall. The freighter struck one of the piers on the southbound span of the bridge. A 1,400 feet (430 m) section of the steel cantilever highway bridge collapsed, causing a Greyhound bus, a truck, and six other vehicles to fall 165 feet (50 m) into the bay, killing thirty-five people.

Mayday call made after the Sunshine Skyway Bridge collision

A noise reduced, condensed version of the above Mayday call.

That day the pilot of Summit Venture was John E. Lerro. He was cleared of wrongdoing by both a state grand jury and a Coast Guard investigation. Although Capt. Lerro resumed his shipping duties soon afterward, he was forced to retire months later by the onset of multiple sclerosis, dying from complications caused by the disease on August 31, 2002, at the age of 59.

Wesley MacIntire was the only person who survived the fall. His truck fell off the bridge but bounced off the bow of Summit Venture before falling into Tampa Bay. He was pulled from the water by the ship's crew. Physically, MacIntire only suffered from a cut on the head and water in his lungs. He sued the company that owned the ship and settled for $175,000 in 1984. He died in 1989 of bone cancer at the age of 65, and always regretted being the sole survivor among those who fell. Each year he drove to the bridge on the accident's anniversary and saluted those who did not survive.

== Return to service and loss ==
Summit Venture was repaired and continued in service under the same name. She called at Tampa for the last time in September 1990, when she was inspected by the US Coast Guard. In November 1993, the ship was sold by its original owner, Hercules Carriers, to Greek-owned Sailor Maritime Co Ltd, Malta, and managed by Endeavor Shipping Company in Piraeus, and renamed to Sailor. Three years later she was rechristened Sailor I, then transferred by Endeavor to a Panama owning company Mediterranean Prestige SA. During this time the ship mostly traded into US West Coast ports. It was sold again in May 2004 to Panama-flag owner Frontier Shipping Inc and managed by KS Maritime Pte. Ltd. of Singapore under the name KS Harmony. The ship changed hands for the last time in 2008, passing to the ownership of Hong Kong-based Jian Xing International Shipping and remaining under the Panama flag as Jianmao 9.

On November 9, 2010, Jianmao 9 sank off the Vietnamese coast, near Lý Sơn island after her holds flooded in heavy weather on a voyage from Malaysia to China. All 27 crew members on board were rescued from liferafts by two container ships, 26 by NYK Aquarius and one by Kota Nelayan.

== See also ==
- Francis Scott Key Bridge collapse
