= Timeline of Pinellas County, Florida history =

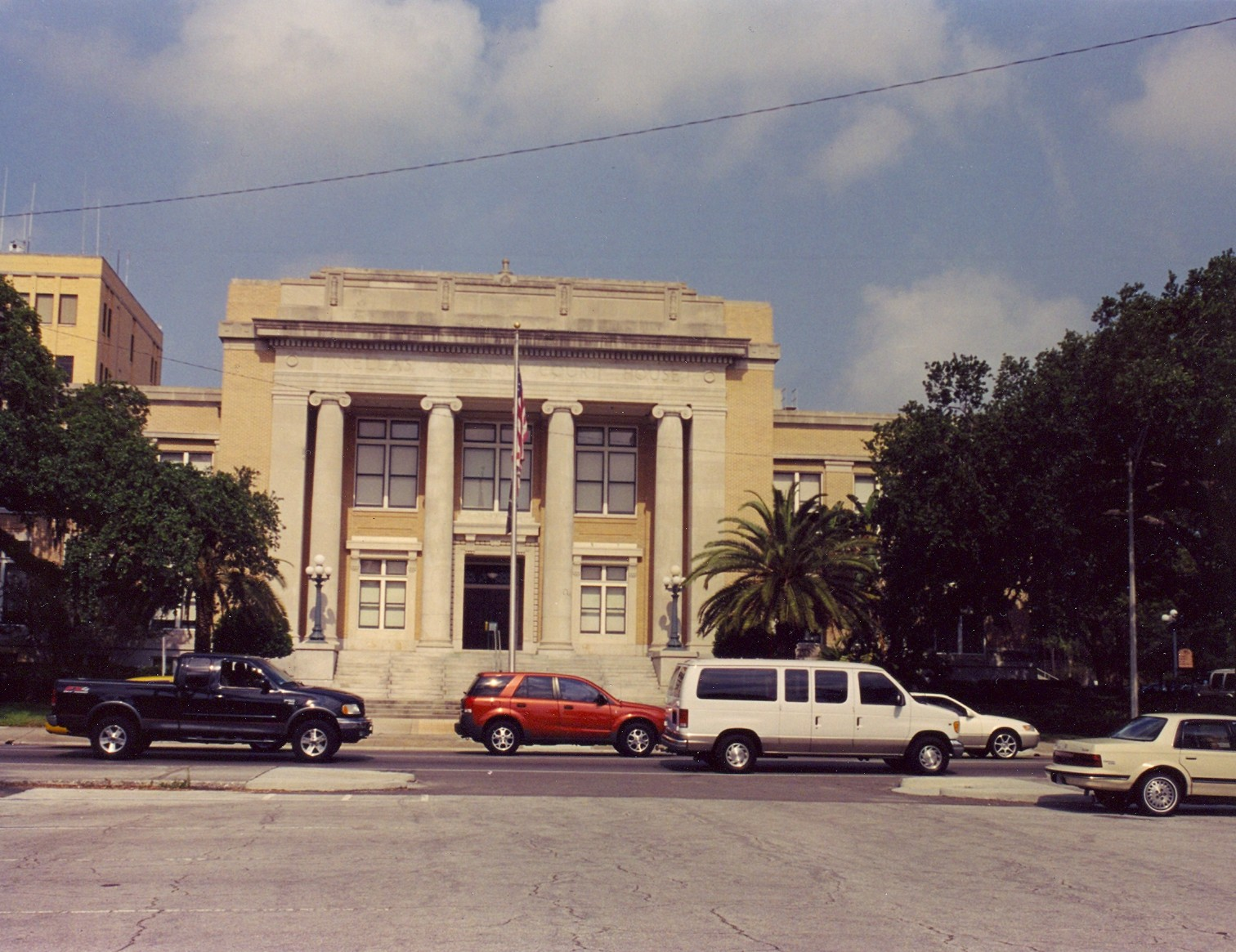
Pinellas County Courthouse Clearwater, Florida

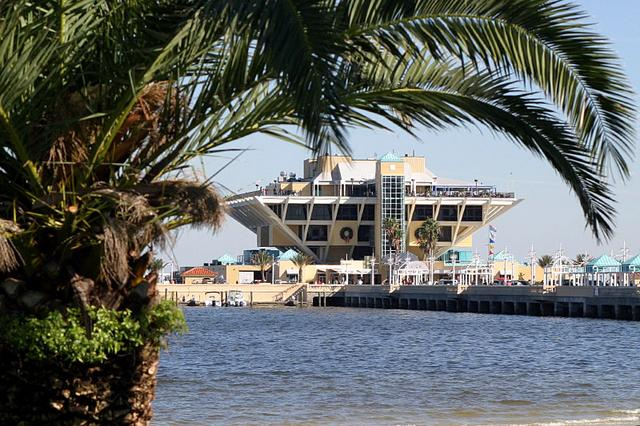
The Pier

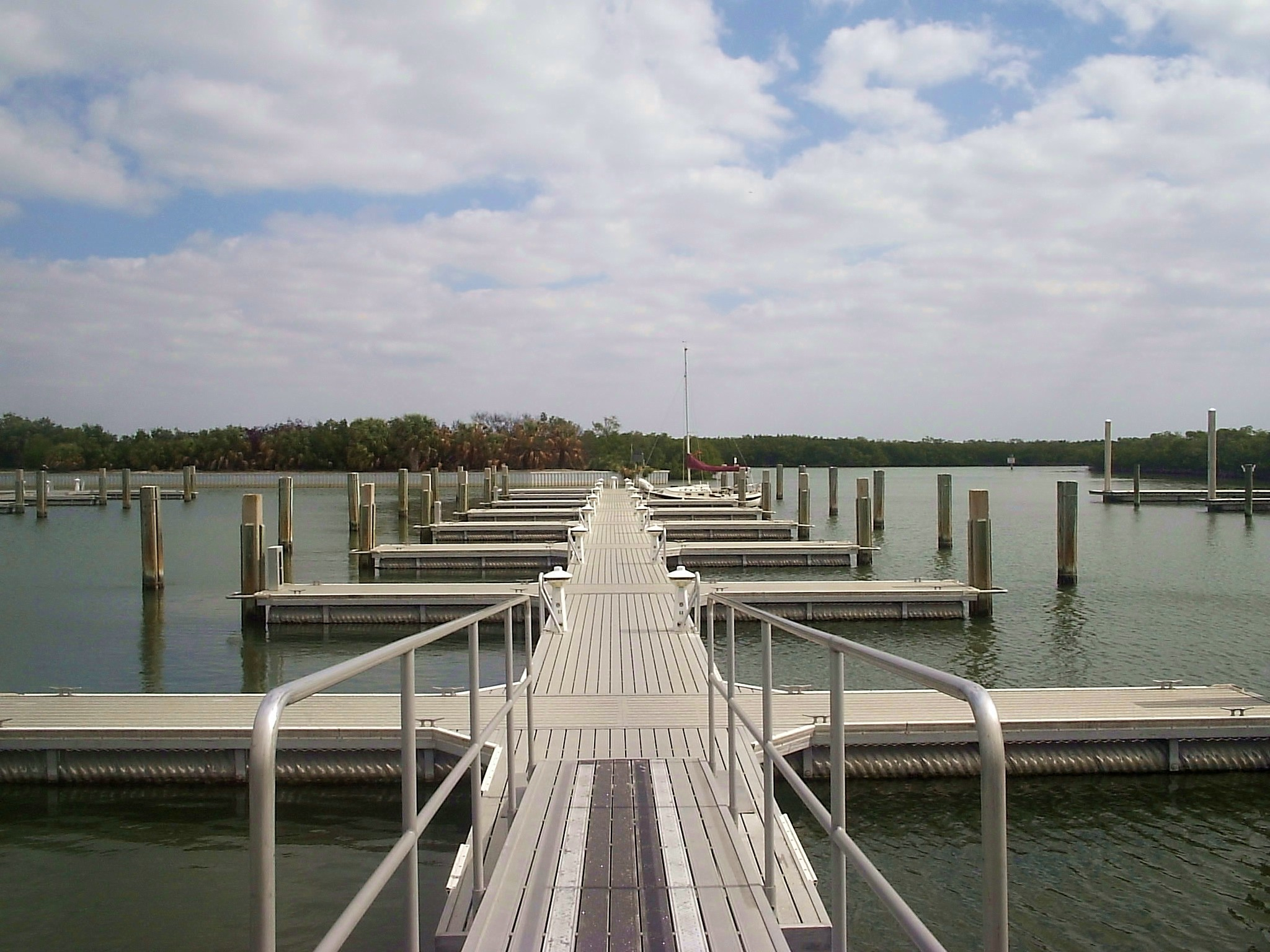
Boatramps at Caledesi Island State Park

Timeline of Pinellas County, Florida history.

== Pre-16th century ==
- 900–16th century Tocobaga live in Tampa Bay area, including Pinellas.

== 16th century ==
- 1513 – March 27 Ponce de Leon discovers Florida.
- 1515–1519 Spanish explorers visit Pinellas barrier islands while trading with Tocobaga.
- 1528 Spanish explorer Pánfilo de Narváez is believed to have landed somewhere on the Pinellas peninsula.
- 1539 Hernando de Soto, another Spanish explorer, is thought to have explored the Tampa Bay area.

== 18th century ==
- 1702–1713 Queen Anne's War. Tocobaga virtually annihilated. English raids reach Tampa Bay. Pinellas largely deserted.
- 1739–1748 War of Jenkins' Ear. English mapping expeditions visit Pinellas Peninsula.
- 1757 Spanish expedition renames Tampa Bay "La Bahia de San Fernando", after the Spanish king. Names entrance to Tampa Bay "La Punta de Pinal de Jimenez" (Point of Pines).
- 1763 Under Treaty of Paris (1763) Spain cedes Florida to England at end of the French and Indian War.
- 1783 Treaty of Paris (1783) ends American Revolutionary War. England cedes Florida to Spain.

== 19th century ==
- 1817–1818 First Seminole War.
- 1821 Spain cedes Florida to United States.
- 1823 U S Army establishes Fort Brooke (later to become Tampa, Florida.)
- 1834 Hillsborough County is formed, including Pinellas peninsula as West Hillsborough.
- 1835 Odet Phillippe homesteads at or near former site of Tocobaga village in present-day Safety Harbor.
- 1841 Fort Harrison opens on Clear Water Harbor as rest and recreation post for soldiers from Fort Brooke.
- 1835–1842 Second Seminole War.
- 1842 Armed Occupation Act provides for land grants in unsettled parts of Florida.
- 1843 Antonio Maximo Hernandez settles on what is now Maximo point in St. Petersburg.
- 1848 Egmont Key lighthouse is built only to be destroyed later that year by the Great Gale, which flooded much of Pinellas.
- On September 27, 1848, a strong hurricane struck the West Coast of Florida. It separated the barrier island on the coast and created a waterway known today as John's Pass. John Levique, along with Joseph Silva, was the one who discovered it and named it after himself.
- 1855 Public school opens on land donated by John Taylor on site of present Clearwater High School.
- 1859 Clear Water Harbor (later Clearwater, Florida) becomes first community on Pinellas. The first post office in Pinellas established there.
- 1861–1865 American Civil War.
- 1868 Anna Germain and John Donaldson are the first African-Americans to settle in lower Pinellas. Road opens from Yellow Bluff (Ozona, Florida) to Tampa.
- 1869 Organized hunting parties strive to eradicate black bears and Florida panthers that threaten Pinellas cattle industry.
- 1876 "Pinellas Village" obtains first post office in what is now St. Petersburg.
- 1884 Disston City (future Gulfport) plat filed.
- 1885 Pinellas's healthsome climate extolled at American Medical Society convention in New Orleans.
- 1886 First house on Passe-a-Grille Island built.
- 1887 Tarpon Springs became the first incorporated city on the peninsula.
- 1888 St. Petersburg, Florida platted, named in honor of St. Petersburg, Russia, the hometown of Orange Belt Railway owner Peter Demens. Orange Belt Railway reaches Tarpon Springs in January and St. Petersburg in May, bringing rapid growth to the county.
- 1890 Tampa Bay Ice Company begins operations, greatly aiding the local fishing industry.
- 1891 Clearwater incorporates.
- 1892 St. Petersburg incorporates.
- 1893 St. Petersburg's first bank organized.
- 1894 Hillsborough Times moves from Clearwater to St. Petersburg and is renamed The St. Petersburg Times.
- 1895 St. Petersburg prohibits cows with bells from wandering within town limits. Henry B. Plant buys Orange Belt Railroad.
- 1897 Henry Plant opens Belleview Biltmore. St. Petersburg Electric Light and Power Company, the future Florida Power Corporation, is chartered.
- 1898 Construction begins on Fort De Soto. St. Petersburg High School is founded.
- 1899 Dunedin incorporated.
- 1900 First land-based hotel built on St. Petersburg's gulf beaches.

== 20th century ==
- 1905 St. Petersburg Reading Room and Library Association founded. Town of Largo incorporated, becoming the first municipality in Pinellas County to adopt a Council–manager government.
- 1906 Fort Dade constructed on Egmont Key.

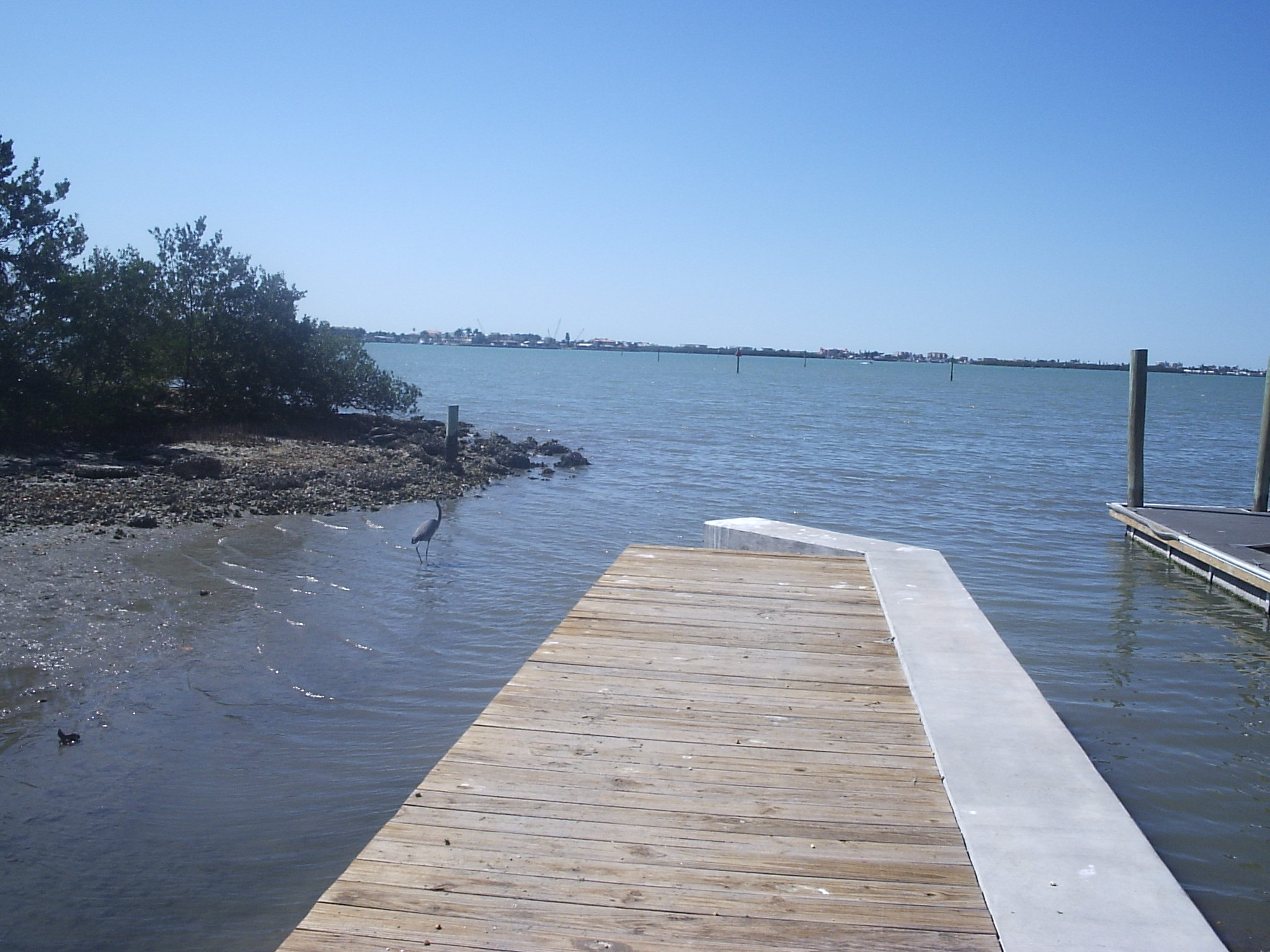
View over a boat ramp on Boca Ciega Bay

- 1907 Pinellas "Declaration of Independence" marks major milestone on the road to creating Pinellas County.
- 1910 Gulfport, Florida incorporated.
- 1910 Tampa and Gulf Coast Railroad extended to Tarpon Springs.
- 1911 St. Petersburg's first high school is built.
- 1912 Pinellas County officially separates from Hillsborough County.
- 1913 Pinellas Park incorporated.
- 1914 Aviation history was made in St. Petersburg as Tony Jannus made the world's first scheduled airline flight with the St. Petersburg–Tampa Airboat Line from St. Petersburg to Tampa.
- 1914 Tampa and Gulf Coast Railroad extended to St. Petersburg. First SAL train arrives September 22.
- 1916 Morton F. Plant, son of Henry B. Plant, gives $100,000 toward creation of Clearwater's first hospital, which still bears his name. Oldsmar, Florida incorporated.
- 1917 No fence law illegalizes cattle roaming free.
- 1918 Cattle stampede in St. Petersburg.
- 1921 Real estate boom period begins Pinellas. Severe hurricane causes significant destruction throughout Pinellas County. Creates Hurricane Pass between what are now Caladesi and Honeymoon islands. Forts Dade and De Soto deactivated.
- 1923 County passes bond issue to build roads and bridges.
- 1924 The Gandy Bridge opens, halving the distance between St. Petersburg and Tampa. The bridge was the longest automobile toll bridge in the world.
- 1925 Palm Harbor named. St. Petersburg Kennel Club begins greyhound racing at what will become Derby Lane. Northern watchdog groups warn of impending collapse of Florida real estate market.
- 1926. Real estate boom ends, severely stressing local economy. Bee Line Ferry begins service between Pinellas and Manatee Counties.
- 1927 American Legion Hospital for Crippled Children is founded.
- 1928 County Commission deputizes Impounding Masters to keep cattle inside county pasture. R. E. Olds sells holdings in Oldsmar and buys Fort Harrison Hotel.
- 1930 City of St. Petersburg defaults on its bonds, a year after Great Depression begins.
- 1934 The Davis (Courtney Campbell) Causeway connects Clearwater more directly with Tampa.

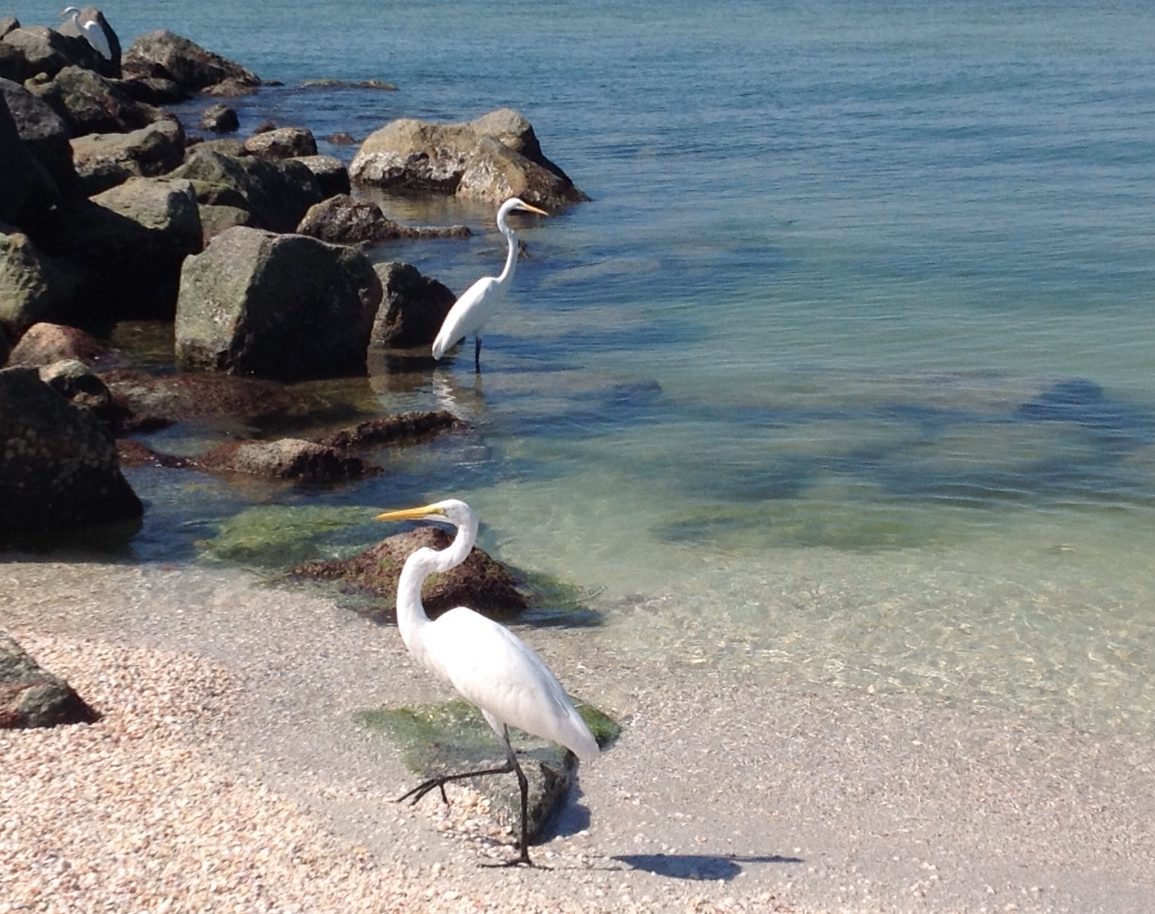
Egrets at Treasure Island, Florida.

- 1938 Treasure Island incorporated.
- 1941 World War II begins; population growth in Pinellas slows dramatically.
- 1942 Military begins sending personnel to Pinellas for training.
- 1943 St. Pete Beach incorporated.
- 1945 World War II ended; Pinellas enters a period of rapid growth and development. Redington Beach incorporated.

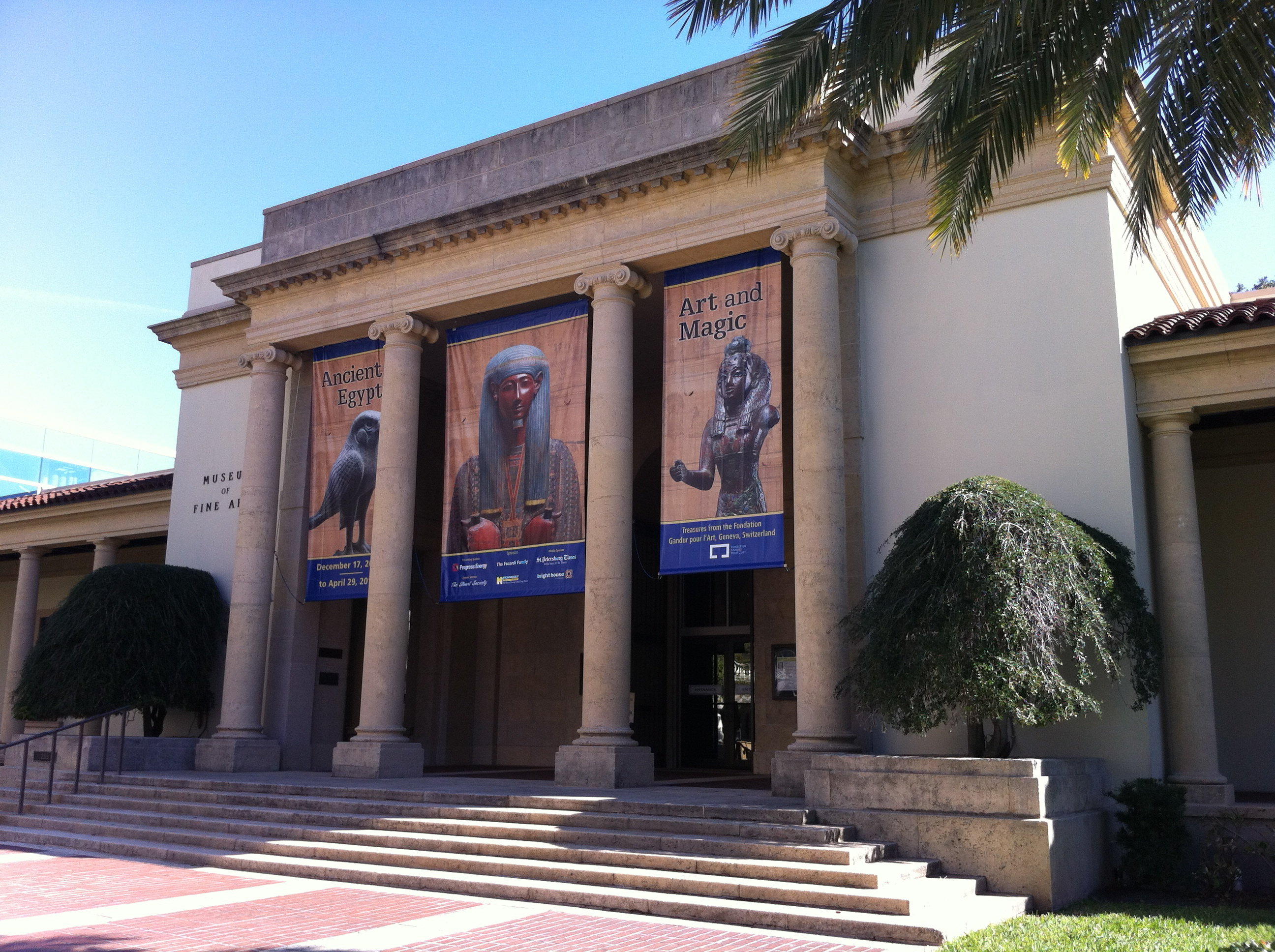
Museum of Fine Arts St. Petersburg

- 1946 Population boom begins as ex-military personnel return as visitors or as residents.
- 1947 Madeira Beach incorporated.
- 1949 Indian Shores incorporated.
- 1951 St. Petersburg Symphony Orchestra performs first concert.
- 1953 North Redington Beach incorporated. 184. WSUN-TV becomes the first TV station to serve Pinellas.
- 1954 Sunshine Skyway Bridge's first span opens linking Pinellas County with Manatee County.
- 1955 Gulf Coast Highway (U. S. Highway 19) opens to St. Petersburg providing a direct route from Pinellas County to Tallahassee, Florida.
- 1956 Redington Shores and Indian Rocks Beach incorporated.
- 1957 Clearwater is the fastest growing U.S. City.
- 1960 The Howard Frankland Bridge provides third link across Tampa Bay.
- 1963 Seaboard Air Line and Atlantic Coast Line railroads gain approval to merge to become the Seaboard Coastline Railroad in 1967.
- 1964 Pinellas becomes the first county in Florida to adopt Commission- Administrator form of government.
- 1965 St. Petersburg Fine Arts Museum opens.
- 1967 American Legion Hospital for Crippled Children is renamed All Children's Hospital.
- 1968 St. Petersburg Symphony Orchestra merges with Tampa Philharmonic to become Florida Gulf Coast Orchestra.
- 1969 Boca Ciega Bay becomes Florida's first aquatic preserve. C. Bette Wimbish becomes first African_American elected to the St. Petersburg City Council.
- 1970 The Central Pinellas Transit Authority provides public transportation to areas north of St. Petersburg.
- 1971 Amtrak takes over railroad passenger service from the Seaboard Coast Line.
- 1971 A second span of the Sunshine Skyway Bridge is opened.
- 1972 Judge James Sanderlin becomes the first African-American elected to county-wide office.
- 1973 Community services and facilities are outpaced by a tremendous surge of new growth and development during the early 1970s.
- 1974 Comprehensive Land Use Plan is the first formal countywide attempt to manage growth in Pinellas County. 200 acres (0.81 km^{2}) of Egmont Key set aside as national wildlife refuge.
- 1975 Church of Scientology purchases Fort Harrison Hotel. (Since arriving in Clearwater in 1975, the Church of Scientology has bought 60 properties in Pinellas County under its name: 58 are in the city of Clearwater and 49 are downtown. About 72 percent of those properties are tax exempt for religious uses.)
- 1976 * Hubbard's Marina, named for a longtime Pinellas family that owned the entire marina from the mid-1970s to 2008.
- The Pinellas County Metropolitan Planning Organization (MPO) replaces the Pinellas County Transportation Authority as a countywide transportation planning organization.
- the Church of Scientology, had purchased two Clearwater landmarks
- 1977 Pinellas County's Heritage Park opens an exhibit of historically significant Pinellas County structures. Corrine Freeman becomes St. Petersburg's first woman mayor.
- 1978 Egmont Key named to the national register of Historic Places.
- 1980 Portions of the southbound span of the Sunshine Skyway Bridge collapse after being hit by the freighter MV Summit Venture. County voters approve Home Rule Charter.

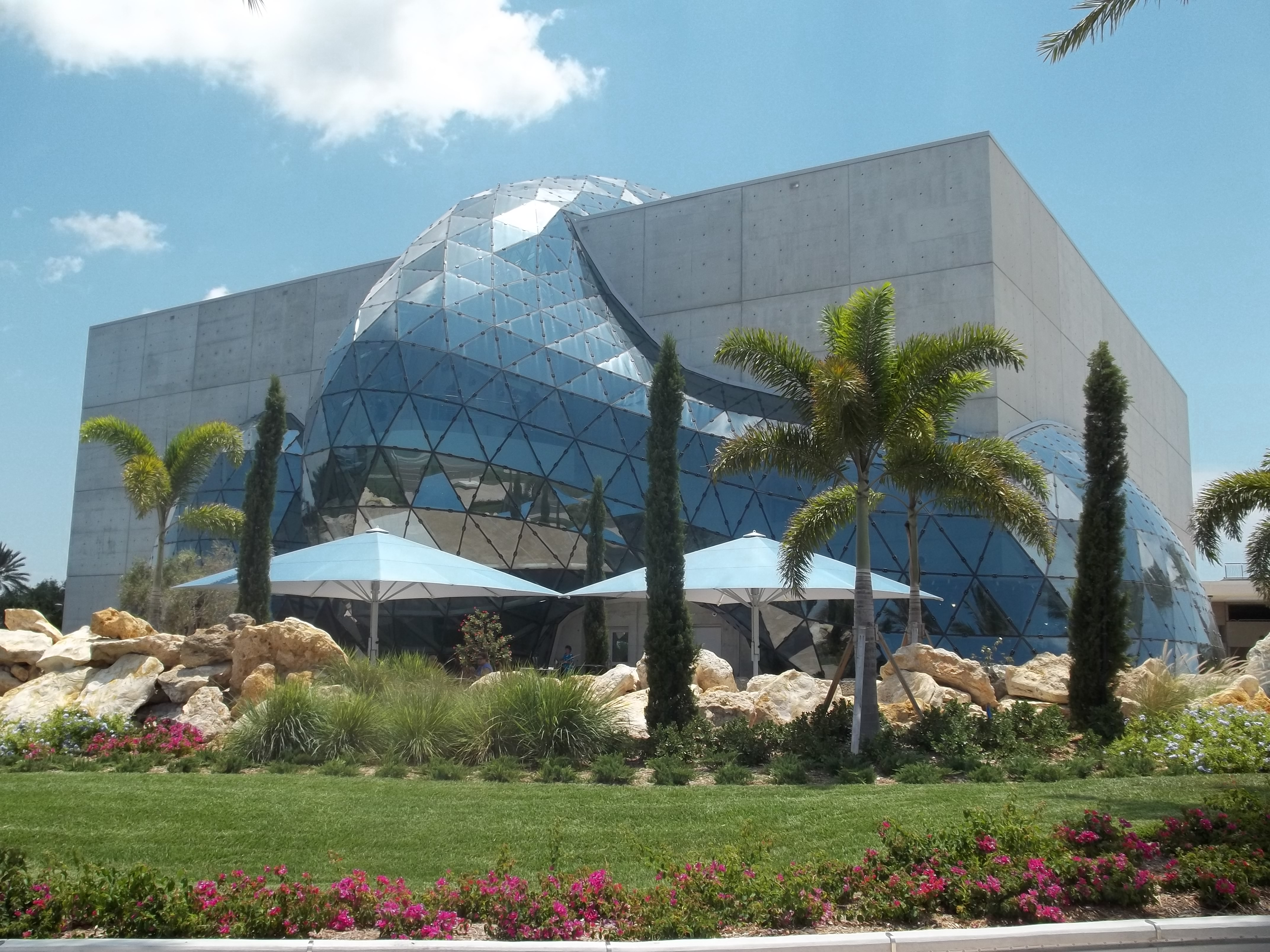
Salvador Dalí Museum St. Petersburg

- 1982 Salvador Dalí Museum opens in St. Petersburg.
- 1983 Pinellas County opens its new Resource Recovery Plant.
- 1984 Amtrak discontinues passenger train service in Pinellas. Countywide bus service is implemented in Pinellas County with the absorption of the St. Petersburg Municipal Transit System into the Pinellas Suncoast Transit Authority. Florida Gulf Coast orchestra becomes The Florida Orchestra.
- 1985 Severe drought results in watering restrictions. A four-cent local option gas tax is passed by the Board of County Commissioners. Hurricane Elena threatens Florida.
- 1990 First segment of Pinellas Trail opens between Dunedin and Seminole. Former SCL railroad right of way had been purchased in 1983.

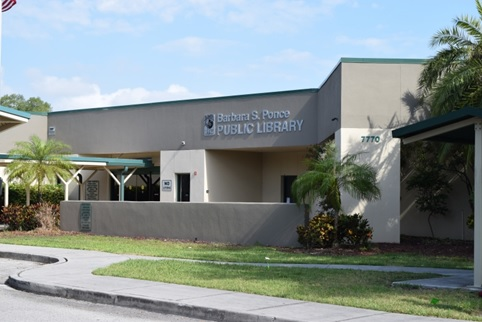
Barbara S. Ponce Public Library exterior

- 1993 "No Name Storm" causes $500 million in damage.
- 1998 Devil Rays open in Thunder Dome, renamed Tropicana Field. Calvin Harris becomes first African American County Commissioner.
- 2000 Charter amendment adopted to end annexation wars among municipalities and county.

== 21st century ==
- 2004 Four hurricanes narrowly miss Pinellas County, causing minor damage.
- Construction of a parking garage at John's Pass.
- 2006 Litigation dance between Largo and Pinellas County continues. Court rules Pinellas County acted wrongly in limiting the annexation authority of municipalities.
- 2009 – The Church of Scientology is reopening its lavishly renovated Fort Harrison Hotel after pouring $40 million.
- John's Pass Village filed for bankruptcy As of 2022 is still in the Fishing Boat Charter Business just renting from Jimmy Hart & Ben Mallah paid $17.2 million at an online auction and later in 2021 Menna's Landing condominium building The Hubbard family has been a major player at John's Pass since Patricia Hubbard's parents, Wilson and Lorraine Hubbard, moved from nearby Pass-a-Grille to John's Pass in the 1970s.
- 2019 A record in price for a gulfront mansion that was constructed in 2004 set a record in price for Pinellas County. The $250,000,000 real estate investor Ben Mallah paid cash for this $16.5 million waterfront estate, by far the most ever paid for a residential property in the Tampa Bay area. Originally built by Ryan Howard, nicknamed the Big Piece", is an American former professional baseball first baseman. Howard spent his entire Major League Baseball (MLB) career playing for the Philadelphia Phillies, from 2004 to 2016. The house sits on a 2 1/2-acre lot on a private beach and features such amenities as a two-story paneled library, a bowling alley, large wine cellar and a huge pool. Ben and Karla Mallah own this 39,000 square mansion on the Gulf of Mexico.

== See also ==
- Timeline of Clearwater, Florida
