= Treasure Island, Florida =

- City
- City of Treasure Island
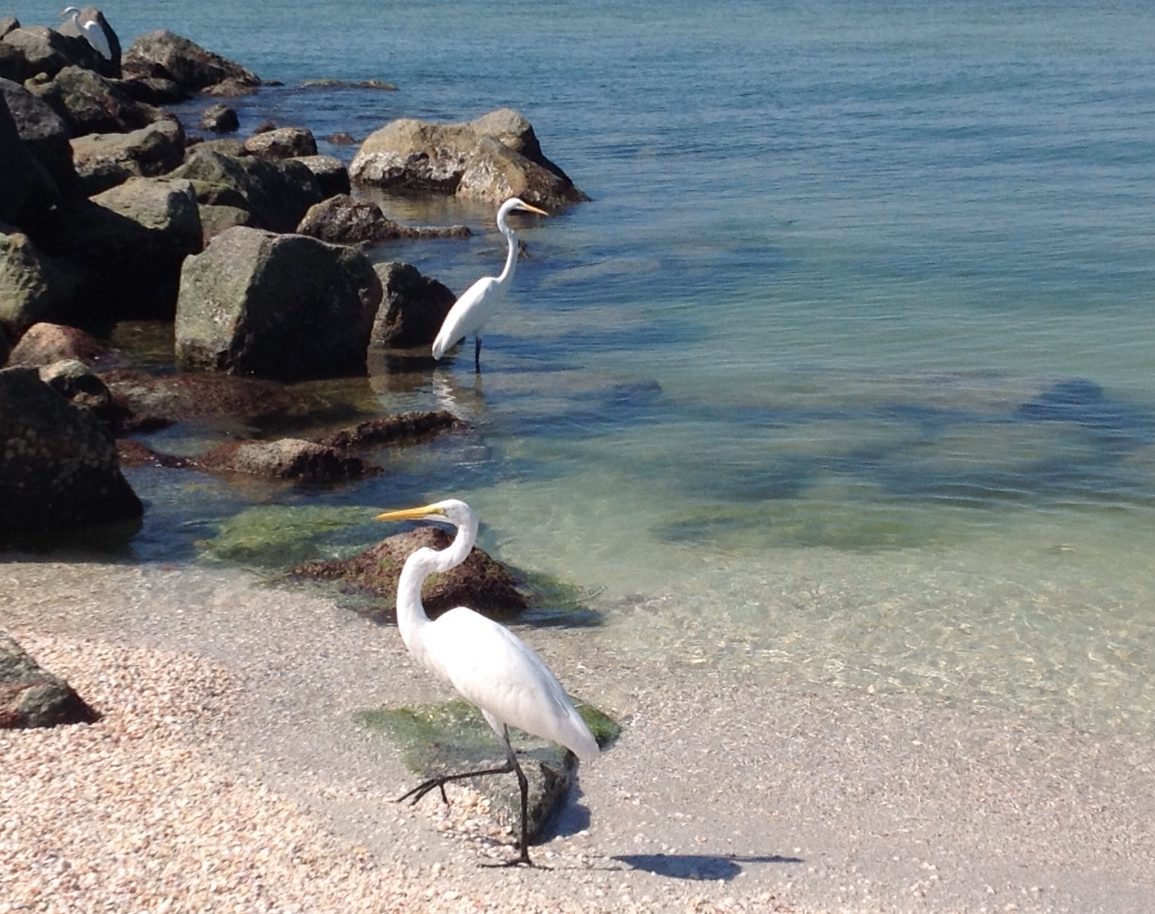
- Egrets at Treasure Island, Florida

- Location in Pinellas County and the state of Florida
- Coordinates: 27°45′25″N 82°45′58″W
- Country: United States
- State: Florida
- County: Pinellas
- Settled: 1848-1908
- Incorporated: May 3, 1955

Government
  - Type: Commission–Manager

Area
  - Total: 5.40 sq mi (13.98 km^{2})
  - Land: 1.54 sq mi (4.00 km^{2})
  - Water: 3.85 sq mi (9.98 km^{2})
- Elevation: 7 ft (2.1 m)

Population (2020)
  - Total: 6,584
  - Density: 4,259/sq mi (1,644.5/km^{2})
- Time zone: UTC-5 (Eastern (EST))
  - Summer (DST): UTC-4 (EDT)
- ZIP codes: 33706, 33740
- Area code: 727
- FIPS code: 12-72325
- GNIS feature ID: 2405600
- Website: www.mytreasureisland.org

Treasure Island is a city in Pinellas County, Florida, United States. It is situated on a barrier island in the Gulf of Mexico. As of the 2020 census, the city population was 6,584.

== History ==
The area of Treasure Island was originally settled in small communities by the Tocobaga around 300 CE. The Timucua traded with other Native American tribes in the area until the arrival of Pánfilo de Narváez in 1528. De Narváez decimated the indigenous people before leaving the area in search of gold.

Treasure Island got its name early in the 20th century, after several property owners attempted to boost sales of the properties being developed on the island by first burying and then pretending to discover a couple of wooden chests on the beach around 1915. After claiming the chests were filled with treasure, the news of the discovery quickly spread and people began calling the island Treasure Island.

With an elevation of only three feet, the Great Gale of 1848 carved out John's Pass on the island's north end and split off two smaller islands, called the Isle of Palms and Isle of Capri.

Treasure Island saw a surge in residential and hotel construction following World War II through the 1950s. The real estate used in these ventures often consisted of fill from dredged material. Artificial extensions of the land were created, which were usually designed for convenient access to navigable waterways like Boca Ciega Bay.

== Geography ==
According to the U.S. Census Bureau, the city has a total area of 5.3 square miles (13.8 km^{2}), of which 1.6 square miles (4.1 km^{2}) is land and 3.7 square miles (9.7 km^{2}) (70.11%) is water.

=== Climate ===
Treasure Island has a humid subtropical climate, closely bordering a tropical climate, resulting in warm, humid summers with frequent thunderstorms, and drier winters.

== Demographics ==
Historical population
Census	Pop.	Note	%±
1950	75		—
1960	3,506		4,574.7%
1970	6,120		74.6%
1980	6,316		3.2%
1990	7,266		15.0%
2000	7,450		2.5%
2010	6,705		−10.0%
2020	6,584		−1.8%
U.S. Decennial Census

=== Racial and ethnic composition ===
Treasure Island racial composition (Hispanics excluded from racial categories) (NH = Non-Hispanic)
Race	Pop 2010	Pop 2020	% 2010	% 2020
White (NH)	6,318	5,900	94.23%	89.61%
Black or African American (NH)	50	53	0.75%	0.80%
Native American or Alaska Native (NH)	11	7	0.16%	0.11%
Asian (NH)	54	70	0.81%	1.06%
Pacific Islander or Native Hawaiian (NH)	3	6	0.04%	0.09%
Some other race (NH)	10	32	0.15%	0.49%
Two or more races/Multiracial (NH)	56	192	0.84%	2.92%
Hispanic or Latino (any race)	203	324	3.03%	4.92%
Total	6,705	6,584		

=== 2020 census ===
As of the 2020 census, Treasure Island had a population of 6,584. The median age was 60.1 years. 5.7% of residents were under the age of 18 and 37.5% of residents were 65 years of age or older. For every 100 females there were 97.2 males, and for every 100 females age 18 and over there were 95.9 males age 18 and over.

100.0% of residents lived in urban areas, while 0.0% lived in rural areas.

There were 3,795 households in Treasure Island, of which 7.4% had children under the age of 18 living in them. Of all households, 41.2% were married-couple households, 23.5% were households with a male householder and no spouse or partner present, and 27.7% were households with a female householder and no spouse or partner present. About 42.9% of all households were made up of individuals and 19.5% had someone living alone who was 65 years of age or older.

There were 5,694 housing units, of which 33.4% were vacant. The homeowner vacancy rate was 2.1% and the rental vacancy rate was 19.1%.

=== Demographic estimates ===
The 2020 5-year American Community Survey estimated that 1,954 families resided in the city.

=== 2010 census ===
As of the 2010 United States census, there were 6,705 people, 3,854 households, and 1,672 families residing in the city.

=== 2000 census ===
At the 2000 census there were 7,450 people in 4,128 households, including 2,059 families, in the city. The population density was 4,679.0 inhabitants per square mile (1,806.6/km^{2}). There were 5,694 housing units at an average density of 3,576.2 per square mile (1,380.8/km^{2}). The racial makeup of the city was 97.69% White, 0.28% African American, 0.28% Native American, 0.59% Asian, 0.03% Pacific Islander, 0.43% from other races, and 0.70% from two or more races. Hispanic or Latino of any race were 2.23% of the population.

Of the 4,128 households in 2000, 10.0% had children under the age of 18 living with them, 43.8% were married couples living together, 4.2% had a female householder with no husband present, and 50.1% were non-families. 41.5% of households were one person and 14.3% were one person aged 65 or older. The average household size was 1.80 and the average family size was 2.38.

The age distribution in 2000 was 9.2% under the age of 18, 2.7% from 18 to 24, 23.4% from 25 to 44, 38.5% from 45 to 64, and 26.3% 65 or older. The median age was 52 years. For every 100 females, there were 95.8 males. For every 100 females age 18 and over, there were 95.0 males.

In 2000, the median household income was $42,150 and the median family income was $64,158. Males had a median income of $38,903 versus $32,586 for females. The per capita income for the city was $34,965. About 3.9% of families and 5.6% of the population were below the poverty line, including 0.4% of those under age 18 and 6.9% of those age 65 or over.

== Library ==
The community is served by the Gulf Beaches Public Library, located in nearby Madeira Beach. The library is supported by Madeira Beach, Redington Beach, North Redington Beach, Redington Shores, and Treasure Island. These five communities have combined their resources in order to fund the library, which they would not be able to maintain individually.

== Notable people ==
- Michael Clarke, rock drummer for The Byrds, Flying Burrito Brothers, and Firefall
- Roberto Hernandez, former MLB relief pitcher
- Jerry Sags, WWE and WCW professional wrestler
- Derek Shelton, manager of the Minnesota Twins, and previously with the Pittsburgh Pirates
