= Augie Donatelli =

American baseball umpire (1914–1990)

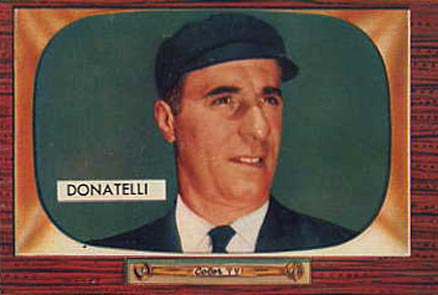
- Born: August 14, 1914; Heilwood, Pennsylvania, U.S.
- Died: May 24, 1990 (aged 75); St. Petersburg, Florida, U.S.
- Resting place: Bay Pines National Cemetery
- Occupation: National League umpire
- Years active: 1950 – 1973
- Employer: National League
- Height: 5' 9.5"/176 cm

August Joseph Donatelli (August 22, 1914 – May 24, 1990) was an American umpire in Major League Baseball who worked in the National League from 1950 to 1973. Highly regarded for his ability, he was also known for his inclination to eject players and managers quickly and dramatically. He was on the cover of the first issue of Sports Illustrated, with catcher Wes Westrum and batter Eddie Mathews, in August 1954.

== Life and career ==
Known as Gus to those close with him, Donatelli was born in Heilwood, Pennsylvania, and raised in Bakerton. After enjoying a 14-game career as a minor league infielder in 1938, he served in the Army Air Forces' Eighth Air Force during World War II and spent 15 months as a German prisoner of war after flying 18 missions as a tailgunner on a B-17. Donatelli's plane was shot down during the first daylight raid on Berlin, and he suffered a broken ankle upon parachuting. He began umpiring softball games while a POW before being freed when Soviet troops overran the area. After the war, Donatelli opted for an umpiring career rather than a return to the coal mines near his hometown, and after graduating from Bill McGowan's school in 1946 worked in the Pioneer League in 1946, the South Atlantic League in 1947, and the International League in 1948–49.

During his major league career, Donatelli umpired in the World Series in 1955 (outfield only), 1957, 1961, 1967 and 1973. He also officiated in the National League Championship Series in 1969 and 1972, serving as crew chief for the latter series, and in the three-game playoff series to determine the NL champion in both 1959 and 1962. Donatelli umpired in the All-Star game in 1953, 1959 (first game), 1962 (first game) and 1969. When the National League umpires began wearing uniform numbers in 1970, Donatelli was assigned uniform number 7.

Donatelli was involved in numerous other notable games. On September 20, 1969, working behind the plate for Bob Moose's 4–0 win, he officiated in his eighth official no-hitter, tying an NL record held by Bob Emslie and Frank Secory; after Secory extended the record to nine in 1970, Donatelli again tied it on September 2, 1972, when he worked first base in Milt Pappas' 8–0 gem. Tom Gorman also tied the record in 1976 before Paul Pryor worked in his 10th no-hitter in 1978. Donatelli called balls and strikes for four of his nine no-hitters, including Warren Spahn's second no-hitter on April 28, 1961, and Ken Johnson's game of April 23, 1964, in which he became the first pitcher in history to lose a nine-inning no-hitter, by a score of 1–0. (disputed) In Game 4 of the 1957 World Series, he awarded Milwaukee Braves pinch-hitter Nippy Jones first base in the 10th inning after determining that there was shoe polish on the ball, showing that Jones had been hit; a pinch runner scored the game-tying run, and the Braves went on to win both the game and the series.

Donatelli was noted for having perhaps the most dramatic ejection gesture in baseball. In a 1952 game between the New York Giants and St. Louis Cardinals, Donatelli ejected the Giants' Bob Elliott for arguing a called strike two, then ejected Elliott's replacement Bobby Hofman for disputing a called third strike. He was part of the crew on May 2, 1954, when Stan Musial hit five home runs in a doubleheader; he was behind the plate in the first game, when Musial hit three of the five. Donatelli was also in the umpiring crew for the May 30, 1956, doubleheader between the Braves and Chicago Cubs, in which the teams combined for a record 15 home runs; the Braves' Bobby Thomson hit a pair in each game, and Hank Aaron and Eddie Mathews each homered in both contests as well. He also umpired in the April 30, 1961, game in which Willie Mays hit four home runs.

Donatelli is widely regarded as having been a primary force in the creation of the first umpires' union, the Major League Umpires Association, in 1964. He lost his position as crew chief immediately afterward, though NL president Warren Giles denied that Donatelli's involvement with the union was the cause.

Immediately following the final out of Game 7 of the 1967 World Series, Donatelli ran off the field from his position at third base with the caps of Dal Maxvill and Julián Javier of the victorious Cardinals in his hands. The picture was picked up by the Associated Press and ran in newspapers from coast to coast the next day.

Donatelli's final game behind the plate came in Game 2 of the 1973 World Series between the New York Mets and Oakland Athletics. Donatelli was involved in a controversial play when he called the Mets' Bud Harrelson out when he tried to score from third base on a fly ball by Félix Millán in the top of the 10th inning with the score tied at 6–6. Replays showed that Harrelson avoided the tag of Athletics catcher Ray Fosse. Willie Mays, playing in his final season in baseball, pleaded his case in front of Donatelli, and soon the argument was joined by Mets manager Yogi Berra and Harrelson. Berra described the call as a "damn joke". The Mets went on to win the game 10–7 in 12 innings, due to two errors in the 12th by Oakland second baseman Mike Andrews.

Donatelli died in his sleep at age 75 at his home in St. Petersburg, Florida, and was buried at Bay Pines National Cemetery in Bay Pines, Florida.

== See also ==
- List of Major League Baseball umpires (disambiguation)
