= Bay Pines National Cemetery =

Veterans cemetery in Pinellas County, Florida

Coordinates: 27°48′32″N 82°46′22″W

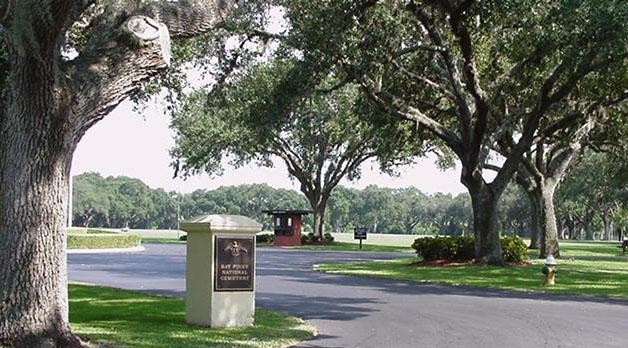
- View of cemetery from main thoroughfare
- Interactive map of Bay Pines National Cemetery

Details
- Location: 10,000 Bay Pines Blvd., North, Bay Pines, Florida
- Type: United States National Cemetery
- Size: 27.3 acres (11.0 ha)
- No. of graves: 27,369

Bay Pines National Cemetery is a United States National Cemetery located in Pinellas County, northwest of the city of St. Petersburg, Florida. It encompasses 27.3 acres (11.0 ha), and as of the end of 2008, had 27,369 interments.

== Geography ==
Bay Pines address is 10,000 Bay Pines Blvd., North, Bay Pines, Florida in Pinellas County, adjacent to Bay Pines Veterans Administration Medical Center.

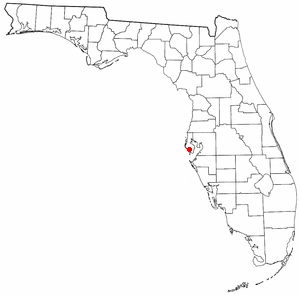
Location of Bay Pines, Florida

== History ==
The site is believed to have been used as a burial ground as early as the Indian Wars, but did not become an official cemetery until March 15, 1933, when it was used to inter those who died in the nearby veterans' hospitals. The first modern interment was made on April 25, 1933. By 1964, all available plots had been filled. In 1984 it was relandscaped and reorganized to allow for more space. In the same year, on May 28, administration of the cemetery was transferred to the Department of Veterans Affairs and it became a National Cemetery. It is now closed to casketed remains unless there is room at the existing gravesite of other family members.

== Notable monuments ==
There are several monuments at the cemetery entrance. The oldest is large in size and made of pink Etowah marble. It was erected in 1937 and dedicated to "the memory of those who served their country". Another is a polished granite bench, dedicated to the memory of World War I veterans. To commemorate the United States Bicentennial, a maple tree was planted in 1976. A POW/MIA monument is the newest addition, facing the World War I bench.

== Notable burials ==
- George Bamberger (1923–2004), major league baseball player and manager
- Billy DeMars (1925–2020), major league baseball player and coach
- Augie Donatelli (1914-1990), major league baseball umpire
- Bill Young (1930–2013), US congressman

== See also ==
- Category:Burials at Bay Pines National Cemetery
