= McKowen =

McKowen is a surname. Notable people with the surname include:

- Joan McKowen (died 1992), Australian ice hockey player
- Scott McKowen, American illustrator

== See also ==
- McCowen
