= Blang Mangat =

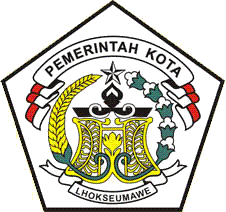
- Seal

- Location of the city in northern Sumatra
- Coordinates: 5°11′17″N 97°8′25″E
- Country: Indonesia
- Province: Aceh
- City: lhokseumawe
- District: Blang Mangat
- City Established: June 21, 2001

Government
  - Camat: Drs. Sulaiman, M.Si

Area
  - Total: 56.12 km^{2} (21.67 sq mi)

Population (2012)
  - Total: 22,850
  - Density: 407.2/km^{2} (1,055/sq mi)
- Time zone: UTC+7 (WIB)
- Postal code: 24351
- Area code: +62645
- Website: https://web.archive.org/web/20140407092443/http://www.bappedalhokseumawe.web.id/

Blang Mangat is a district in Lhokseumawe, Aceh, Indonesia.

== Administrative divisions ==
list the name of the village (Gampong) is in Districts of Blang Mangat

- Gampong Alue Lim (postcode : 24375)
- Gampong Asan Kareung (postcode : 24375)
- Gampong Baloy (postcode : 24375)
- Gampong Blang Buloh (postcode : 24375)
- Gampong Blang Cut (postcode : 24375)
- Gampong Blang Punteut (postcode : 24375)
- Gampong Blang Teue (postcode : 24375)
- Gampong Blang Weu Baroh (postcode : 24375)
- Gampong Blang Weu Panjou (postcode : 24375)
- Gampong Jambo Mesjid(postcode : 24375)
- Gampong Jambo Timu (postcode : 24375)
- Gampong Jeulikat (postcode : 24375)
- Gampong Keude Punteut (postcode : 24375)
- Gampong Kuala Meuraksa (postcode : 24375)
- Gampong Kumbang Punteut (postcode : 24375)
- Gampong Mane Kareung (postcode : 24375)
- Gampong Mesjid Meuraksa (postcode : 24375)
- Gampong Mesjid Punteut (postcode : 24375)
- Gampong Rayeuk Kareung (postcode : 24375)
- Gampong Seuneubok (postcode : 24375)
- Gampong Teungoh (postcode : 24375)
- Gampong Tunong (postcode : 24375)
- Gampong Ulee Blang Mane (postcode : 24375)
