= McCowen =

McCowen is a surname. Notable people with the surname include:

- Alec McCowen (1925–2017), English actor
- Baloy McCowen (1893–1959), American illustrator
- Christopher McCowen, American criminal
- Donald McCowen (1908–1998), British rower
- Edward Oscar McCowen (1877–1953), American politician
