= Baloy McCowen =

American magazine illustrator and artist

Arthur Baloy Ray McCowen (July 29, 1893 – October 14, 1959) was an American illustrator who drew magazine covers between 1920 and 1959. He also made illustrations for pulp magazines, including five covers for Liberty magazine between 1932 and 1933. He also produced covers for American Detective, True Romance, Liberty, True Detective, Physical Culture, Love & Romance and Satire Presents.

== Biography ==
McCowen was born in Portland, Oregon, on July 29, 1893, to Arthur and Carrie McCowen. His father worked as a grocer in Portland. In 1910, McCowen and his father were living in Los Angeles, California, where McCowen worked as an assistant bookkeeper at Blake, Moffit & Town, a paper company.

In 1917, McCowen joined the U. S. Navy and went to war, as a 2nd Lt. in the Yuma National Guard. By 1920, McCowen was living in Manhattan, working as commercial artist. During this period, McCowen produced hundreds of magazine covers and Illustrations for popular pulp magazines. In 1956 McCowen retired and he moved to Florida.

McCowen died on October 14, 1959, at age 66 at Bay Pines Veterans Hospital, in Bay Pines, Florida.

== List of Published Illustrations ==
- Liberty Magazine, issue 33, August 13, 1932
- Liberty Magazine, issue 38, September 17, 1932
- Liberty Magazine, issue 12, March 25, 1933
- Liberty Magazine, issue 37, September 16, 1933
- Liberty Magazine, issue 35, November 11, 1933
