= Bay Pines Site =

- U.S. National Register of Historic Places
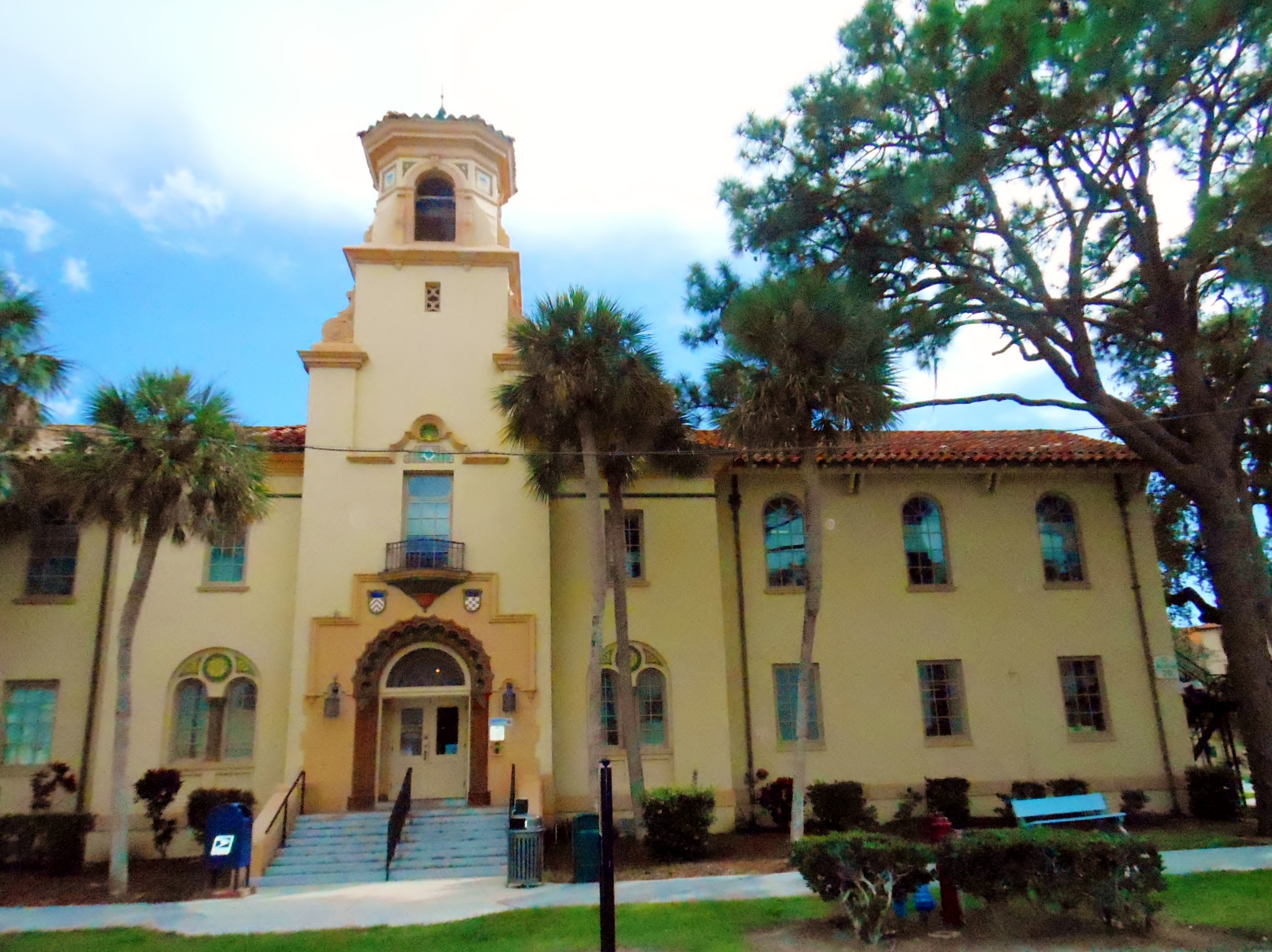

- Location within Florida Location within the United States
- Location: Bay Pines, Florida
- Coordinates: 27°48′37″N 82°46′42″W
- NRHP reference No.: 83001443
- Added to NRHP: February 23, 1983

The Bay Pines Site is a historic site in Bay Pines, Florida. It is located on the property of the Veterans' Administration Medical Center in Bay Pines. On February 23, 1983, it was added to the U.S. National Register of Historic Places.
