= Gulf Beaches Public Library =

Coordinates: 27.803817°N 82.801420°W

- Location: Maderia Beach, FL

Other information
- Director: Stanley Silverstein
- Website: http://www.gulfbeacheslibrary.org/

The Gulf Beaches Public Library, located in Madeira Beach, Florida, is a nonprofit organization supported by the Towns of Redington Shores, North Redington Beach, Redington Beach, and the Cities of Madeira Beach and Treasure Island, Florida. It operates under the governance of a ten-member Board of Trustees, with each of the five municipalities appointing two members. The library is part of the Pinellas Public Library Cooperative, which enables resource sharing among public libraries in Pinellas County.

== History ==
The idea of a library to serve the residents of the mid-beach communities began at a September 1949 meeting of the Gulf Beach Woman's Club. Under the leadership of the first club president, Mrs. Polly Van Dyke, a committee of six women began collecting books. These efforts culminated in 1952 when a one-room building was constructed on 140th Avenue in Madeira Beach to house the collection.

Over the next 15 years, the library grew significantly. In 1969, a new building was dedicated at the library's current location. Edyth Mariani, one of the original committee members, served as the head librarian until her retirement on December 31, 1979.

In 1988, the library expanded to house its ever-growing collection. An additional 3,600 square feet was added to the existing structure, providing more shelving and reading space, and bringing the total area of the library to 10,000 square feet.

In 1989, the library became a member of the Pinellas Public Library Cooperative, allowing the community to benefit from the sharing of resources with the other public libraries in Pinellas County. In 2008, the library board fired the director of the library. More recently, in 2016, the library began work on updating its long range plan.
