= Baloy =

Baloy is both a given name and a surname. Notable people with the name include:

- Baloy McCowen (1893–1959), American illustrator
- Baldomero Aguinaldo y Baloy (1869–1915), leader of the Philippine Revolution
- Felipe Baloy (born 1981), Panamanian footballer
- Félix Baloy (born 1943), Cuban singer, sonero, and percussionist
