= Bay Pines Veterans Administration Home and Hospital Historic District =

Historic district in Florida, United States

- U.S. National Register of Historic Places
- U.S. Historic district
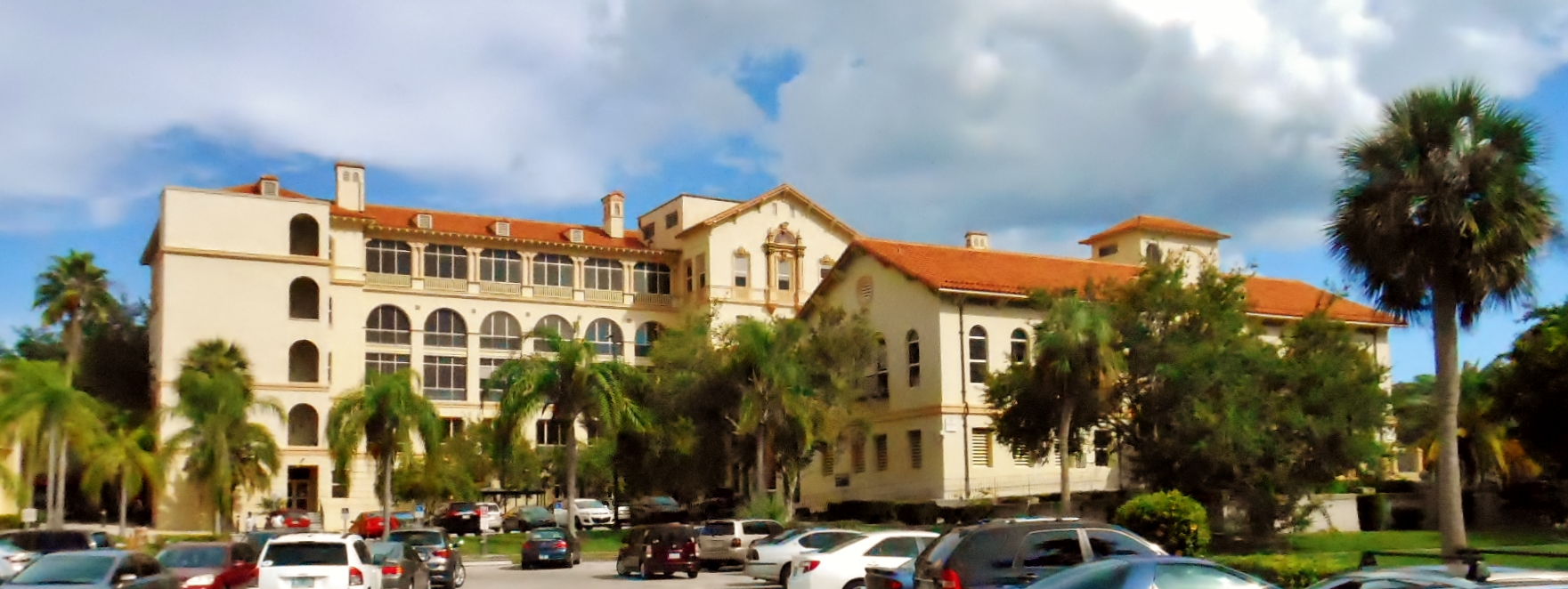

- Location within Florida Location within the United States
- Location: Bay Pines, Florida
- Coordinates: 27°48′49″N 82°46′41″W
- NRHP reference No.: 12000363
- Added to NRHP: June 27, 2012

The Bay Pines Veterans Administration Home and Hospital Historic District is a U.S. historic district located at 10000 Bay Pines Blvd. in Bay Pines, Florida. The district contains prehistoric aboriginal sites and fourteen Mediterranean Revival style hospital buildings constructed from the 1930s. The district is home to the Bay Pines Veterans Affairs Medical Center, a general medical and surgical hospital with 396 beds. It is accredited by the Commission on Accreditation of Rehabilitation Facilities (CARF).

The district was added to the National Register of Historic Places on June 27, 2012.

== History ==
In January 1929 a bill was passed allowing for the construction of a veterans hospital in the southeastern US. Bay Pines was chosen, and in 1933 the first of the buildings was completed. In 1934 the VA regional office was moved to Bay Pines. The VA office eventually left but returned in 1998. Buildings have been added ever since leading to the hospital complex that exists today.

== Building 11 ==
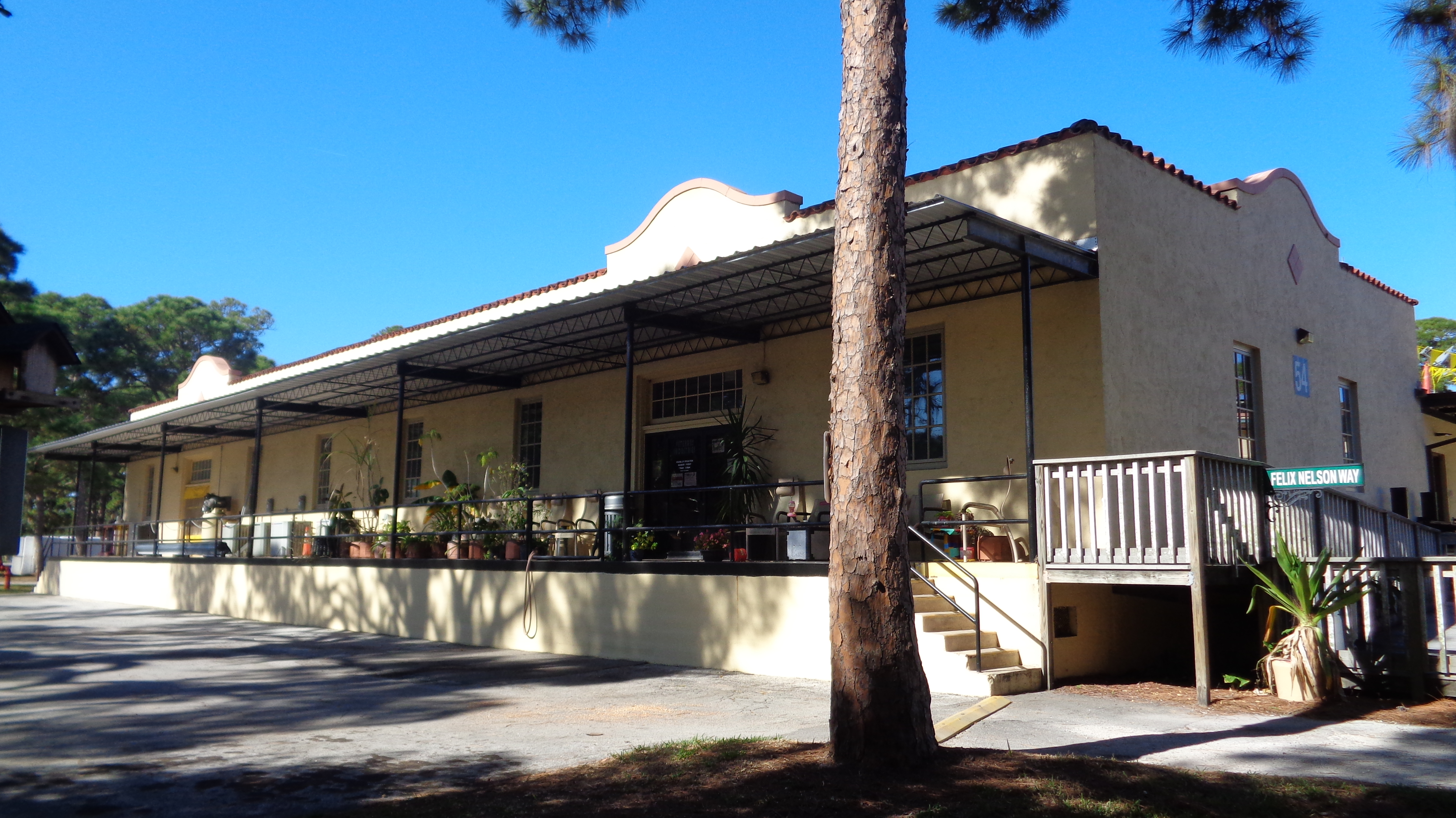
Building 11 in 2016.

Building 54, now part of Building 11, was originally a train depot built by the Seaboard Air Line Railroad in 1933. It closed in 1967 and it, along with Building 11A, was later combined and integrated with Building 11, which is now used as the VA police station.

== Bibliography ==
- Luisi, Vincent (2010). Railroading in Pinellas County (1st ed.). Arcadia Publishing. ISBN 978-0-7385-8550-5.

Preceding station	Seaboard Air Line Railroad	Following station
Pasedena toward St. Petersburg	St. Petersburg - Alcoma	Oakhurst toward Alcoma
