= Redington Shores, Florida =

Town in the state of Florida, United States

- Town
- Town of Redington Shores
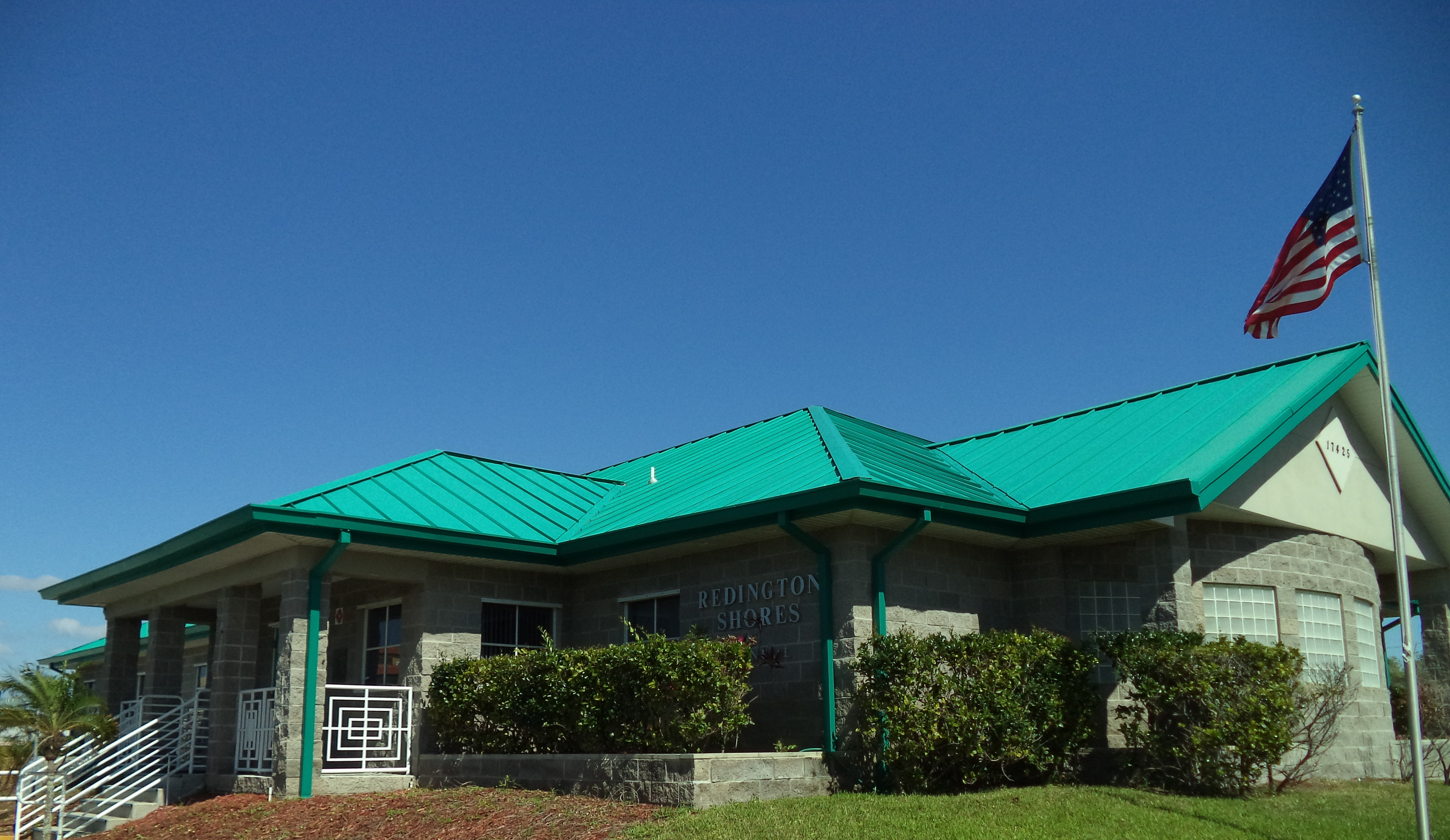
- Redington Shores Town Hall on May 6, 2013

- Seal

- Location in Pinellas County and the state of Florida
- Coordinates: 27°49′45″N 82°49′57″W
- Country: United States
- State: Florida
- County: Pinellas
- Founded: c. 1930–1935
- Incorporated: 1955

Government
  - Type: Mayor–Commission
  - Mayor: Erin Schoos
  - Vice Mayor: CJ Hoyt
  - Commissioners: Larry Maynard and Doug Harr
  - Town Manager: Margaret Carey
  - Town Clerk: Michelle Lowe

Area
  - Total: 1.08 sq mi (2.80 km^{2})
  - Land: 0.33 sq mi (0.85 km^{2})
  - Water: 0.75 sq mi (1.95 km^{2})
- Elevation: 10 ft (3.0 m)

Population (2020)
  - Total: 2,176
  - Density: 6,596.8/sq mi (2,547.03/km^{2})
- Time zone: UTC-5 (Eastern (EST))
  - Summer (DST): UTC-4 (EDT)
- ZIP code: 33708
- Area code: 727
- FIPS code: 12-59750
- GNIS feature ID: 2407190
- Website: townofredingtonshores.com

Redington Shores is a town in Pinellas County, Florida, United States. The county is part of the Tampa–St. Petersburg–Clearwater Metropolitan Statistical Area, more commonly known as the Tampa Bay Area. The population was 2,176 at the 2020 census.

== Geography ==
According to the United States Census Bureau, the town has a total area of 1.2 square miles (3.1 km^{2}), of which 0.4 square miles (1.0 km^{2}) is land and 0.8 square miles (2.1 km^{2}) (67.50%) is water. According to Elevation Map Logs, the elevation of Redington Shores is just one meter above sea level.

=== Climate ===
The climate in this area is characterized by hot, humid summers and generally mild winters. According to the Köppen climate classification, the Town of Redington Shores has a humid subtropical climate zone (Cfa).

According to Weather Underground, the historical average day temperature is 79.7 degrees Fahrenheit (°F), with the high averaging around 88.3 °F and the low being 71.9 °F degrees. Redington Shores faces high wind speeds averaging around 9 miles per hour. The close proximity to the ocean brings a recurring ocean breeze that cools the beach area.

== Demographics ==
Historical population
Census	Pop.	Note	%±
1960	917		—
1970	1,733		89.0%
1980	2,142		23.6%
1990	2,366		10.5%
2000	2,338		−1.2%
2010	2,121		−9.3%
2020	2,176		2.6%
U.S. Decennial Census

=== Racial and ethnic composition ===
Redington Shores racial composition (Hispanics excluded from racial categories) (NH = Non-Hispanic)
Race	Pop 2010	Pop 2020	% 2010	% 2020
White (NH)	1,960	1,894	92.41%	87.04%
Black or African American (NH)	9	18	0.42%	0.83%
Native American or Alaska Native (NH)	5	5	0.24%	0.23%
Asian (NH)	18	58	0.85%	2.67%
Pacific Islander or Native Hawaiian (NH)	0	0	0.00%	0.00%
Some other race (NH)	5	6	0.24%	0.28%
Two or more races/Multiracial (NH)	20	57	0.94%	2.62%
Hispanic or Latino (any race)	104	138	4.90%	6.34%
Total	2,121	2,176		

=== 2020 census ===
As of the 2020 census, Redington Shores had a population of 2,176. The median age was 60.6 years. 7.9% of residents were under the age of 18 and 39.5% were 65 years of age or older. For every 100 females, there were 96.4 males; for every 100 females age 18 and over, there were 95.0 males.

100.0% of residents lived in urban areas, while 0.0% lived in rural areas. There were 1,150 households in Redington Shores, of which 11.8% had children under the age of 18 living in them. Of all households, 51.2% were married-couple households, 19.6% were households with a male householder and no spouse or partner present, and 24.3% were households with a female householder and no spouse or partner present. About 34.6% of all households were made up of individuals, and 18.0% had someone living alone who was 65 years of age or older.

There were 2,015 housing units, of which 42.9% were vacant. The homeowner vacancy rate was 1.6%, and the rental vacancy rate was 30.2%.

According to the 2020 American Community Survey 5-year estimates, there were 564 families residing in the town.

=== 2010 census ===
As of the 2010 census, there were 2,121 people, 1,037 households, and 518 families residing in the town.

=== 2000 census ===
As of the census of 2000, there were 2,338 people, 1,292 households, and 658 families residing in the town. The population density was 5,955.4 inhabitants per square mile (2,299.4/km^{2}). There were 2,101 housing units at an average density of 5,351.7 per square mile (2,066.3/km^{2}). The racial makeup of the town was 97.60% White, 0.21% African American, 0.47% Native American, 0.47% Asian, 0.30% from other races, and 0.94% from two or more races. Hispanic or Latino of any race were 2.95% of the population.

In 2000, there were 1,292 households, out of which 8.9% had children under the age of 18 living with them, 43.5% were married couples living together, 5.2% had a female householder with no husband present, and 49.0% were non-families. 41.3% of all households were made up of individuals, and 20.0% had someone living alone who was 65 years of age or older. The average household size was 1.81 and the average family size was 2.38.

In 2000, in the town, the population was spread out, with 9.2% under the age of 18, 3.1% from 18 to 24, 19.7% from 25 to 44, 34.0% from 45 to 64, and 34.0% who were 65 years of age or older. The median age was 55 years. For every 100 females, there were 95.2 males. For every 100 females age 18 and over, there were 94.6 males.

In 2000, the median income for a household in the town was $40,411, and the median income for a family was $49,300. Males had a median income of $36,719 versus $30,662 for females. The per capita income for the town was $31,822. About 5.5% of families and 8.2% of the population were below the poverty line, including 14.6% of those under age 18 and 8.3% of those age 65 or over.

== Ecology ==
Redington Shores is home to numerous plants and organisms which thrive around the beach and ocean. Plants on the beach include mangroves, sea oats, and sea grapes. All of these organisms prevent erosion on the dunes and are essential to organisms around them. The mangroves are protected due to the State's “Mangrove Trimming and Preservation Act.” A population of coyotes and loggerhead turtles can be found in Redington Shores.

Karenia brevis, red tide, causes problems in the ocean at Redington Shores. An increase of this organism in the ocean causes harm to organisms around it. Due to the high concentration of K. brevis in the Gulf of Mexico, Redington Shores faces problems with deadly impacts on marine life.

== Library ==
The community is served by the Gulf Beaches Public Library, located in nearby Madeira Beach. The library is supported by Madeira Beach, Redington Beach, North Redington Beach, Redington Shores, and Treasure Island. These five communities have combined their resources in order to fund the library.
