= North Redington Beach, Florida =

Town in the state of Florida, United States

- Town
- Town of North Redington Beach
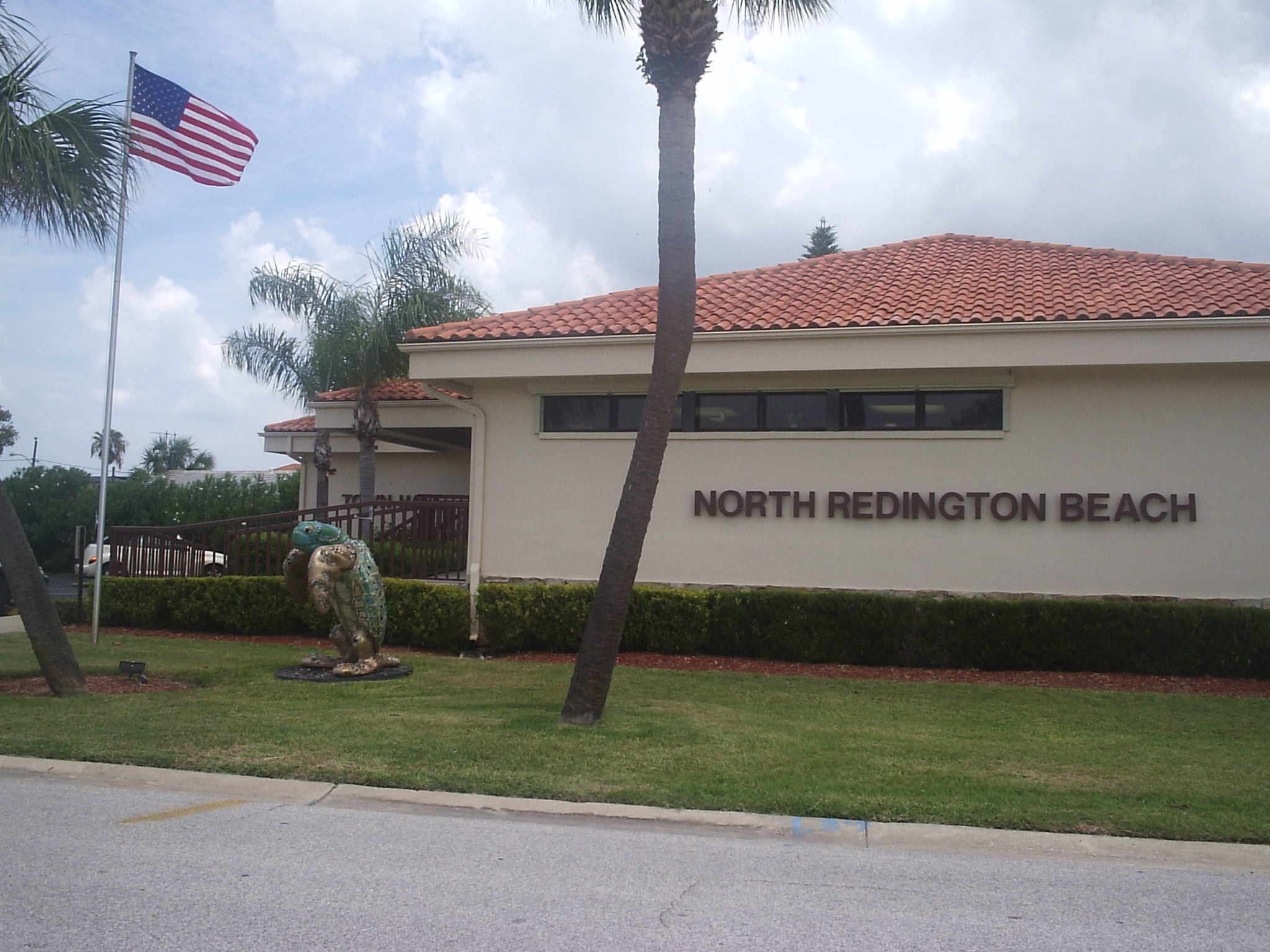
- North Redington Beach Town Hall

- Seal

- Location in Pinellas County and the state of Florida
- Coordinates: 27°49′09″N 82°49′22″W
- Country: United States
- State: Florida
- County: Pinellas
- Founded: 1935
- Incorporated: 1953

Government
  - Type: Mayor–Commission
  - Mayor: Jay Super
  - Vice Mayor: Kevin Kennedy
  - Commissioners: John Messmore, Richard Nagrabski, and Corey Thornton
  - Town Clerk: Mari Campbell
  - Town Attorney: Jay Daigneault

Area
  - Total: 0.98 sq mi (2.55 km^{2})
  - Land: 0.26 sq mi (0.68 km^{2})
  - Water: 0.73 sq mi (1.88 km^{2})
- Elevation: 3 ft (0.91 m)

Population (2020)
  - Total: 1,495
  - Density: 5,718.9/sq mi (2,208.08/km^{2})
- Time zone: UTC-5 (Eastern (EST))
  - Summer (DST): UTC-4 (EDT)
- ZIP code: 33708
- Area code: 727
- FIPS code: 12-49725
- GNIS feature ID: 2407007
- Website: www.townofnorthredingtonbeach.com

North Redington Beach is a town in Pinellas County, Florida, United States. It is part of the Tampa–St. Petersburg–Clearwater Metropolitan Statistical Area, more commonly known as the Tampa Bay Area. The population was 1,495 at the 2020 census.

== Geography ==
According to the United States Census Bureau, the town has a total area of 1.0 square mile (2.6 km^{2}), of which 0.3 square miles (0.78 km^{2}) is land and 0.7 square miles (1.8 km^{2}) (70.59%) is water.

=== Climate ===
The climate in this area is characterized by hot, humid summers and generally mild winters. According to the Köppen climate classification, the Town of North Redington Beach has a humid subtropical climate zone (Cfa).

== Demographics ==
Historical population
Census	Pop.	Note	%±
1960	346		—
1970	768		122.0%
1980	1,156		50.5%
1990	1,135		−1.8%
2000	1,474		29.9%
2010	1,417		−3.9%
2020	1,495		5.5%
U.S. Decennial Census

=== Racial and ethnic composition ===
North Redington Beach racial composition (Hispanics excluded from racial categories) (NH = Non-Hispanic)
Race	Pop 2010	Pop 2020	% 2010	% 2020
White (NH)	1,345	1,318	94.92%	88.16%
Black or African American (NH)	5	22	0.35%	1.47%
Native American or Alaska Native (NH)	2	4	0.14%	0.27%
Asian (NH)	12	12	0.85%	0.80%
Pacific Islander or Native Hawaiian (NH)	0	0	0.00%	0.00%
Some other race (NH)	2	4	0.14%	0.27%
Two or more races/Multiracial (NH)	8	50	0.56%	3.34%
Hispanic or Latino (any race)	43	85	3.03%	5.69%
Total	1,417	1,495		

=== 2020 census ===
As of the 2020 census, North Redington Beach had a population of 1,495. The median age was 59.0 years. 8.1% of residents were under the age of 18 and 35.5% of residents were 65 years of age or older. For every 100 females there were 89.0 males, and for every 100 females age 18 and over there were 87.2 males age 18 and over.

100.0% of residents lived in urban areas, while 0.0% lived in rural areas.

There were 781 households in North Redington Beach, of which 11.4% had children under the age of 18 living in them. Of all households, 49.9% were married-couple households, 16.3% were households with a male householder and no spouse or partner present, and 26.8% were households with a female householder and no spouse or partner present. About 31.7% of all households were made up of individuals and 14.7% had someone living alone who was 65 years of age or older.

There were 1,264 housing units, of which 38.2% were vacant. The homeowner vacancy rate was 1.7% and the rental vacancy rate was 14.3%.

According to the 2020 American Community Survey 5-year estimates, there were 413 families residing in the town.

=== 2010 census ===
As of the 2010 United States census, there were 1,417 people, 693 households, and 323 families residing in the town.

=== 2000 census ===
As of the census of 2000, there were 1,474 people, 804 households, and 463 families residing in the town. The population density was 4,866.5 inhabitants per square mile (1,879.0/km^{2}). There were 1,372 housing units at an average density of 4,529.8 per square mile (1,749.0/km^{2}). The racial makeup of the town was 96.81% White, 0.27% African American, 0.27% Native American, 0.95% Asian, 0.20% Pacific Islander, 0.34% from other races, and 1.15% from two or more races. Hispanic or Latino of any race were 3.05% of the population.

In 2000, there were 804 households, out of which 8.6% had children under the age of 18 living with them, 50.9% were married couples living together, 4.7% had a female householder with no husband present, and 42.3% were non-families. 35.6% of all households were made up of individuals, and 21.5% had someone living alone who was 65 years of age or older. The average household size was 1.83 and the average family size was 2.31.

In 2000, in the town, the population was spread out, with 8.2% under the age of 18, 2.5% from 18 to 24, 18.0% from 25 to 44, 31.5% from 45 to 64, and 39.8% who were 65 years of age or older. The median age was 58 years. For every 100 females, there were 84.7 males. For every 100 females age 18 and over, there were 83.6 males.

In 2000, the median income for a household in the town was $46,196, and the median income for a family was $60,855. Males had a median income of $52,206 versus $35,114 for females. The per capita income for the town was $40,066. About 0.9% of families and 4.2% of the population were below the poverty line, including none of those under age 18 and 3.6% of those age 65 or over.

== Library ==
The community is served by the Gulf Beaches Public Library, located in nearby Madeira Beach. The library is supported by Madeira Beach, Redington Beach, North Redington Beach, Redington Shores, and Treasure Island. These five communities have combined their resources in order to fund the library, which they would not be able to maintain individually.
