= 1848 Tampa Bay hurricane =

Category 4 Atlantic hurricane in 1848

1848 Tampa Bay hurricane Great Gale of 1848
Meteorological history
- Formed: September 23, 1848
- Dissipated: September 28, 1848

Category 4 major hurricane
- 1-minute sustained (SSHWS/NWS)
- Highest winds: 130 mph (215 km/h)
- Lowest pressure: 948 mbar (hPa); 27.99 inHg

Overall effects
- Fatalities: None
- Damage: $20,000 (1848 USD)
- Areas affected: Central and North Florida
- Part of the 1848 Atlantic hurricane season

The 1848 Tampa Bay hurricane (also known as the Great Gale of 1848) was the strongest known hurricane to impact the Tampa Bay area of the U.S. state of Florida. Along with the 1921 Tampa Bay hurricane and Hurricane Milton in 2024, it is one of only three major hurricanes to make landfall along Central Florida's west coast since Florida became a United States territory in 1821.

The 1848 storm is believed to have formed in the Gulf of Mexico and made landfall near modern-day Clearwater in Pinellas County on September 24. It generated the highest storm surge ever recorded in Tampa Bay, reshaping parts of the nearby coastline and destroying many of the small settlements in the area at the time. Although precise records are unavailable, the storm's barometric pressure and storm surge are consistent with at least a Category 4 hurricane. The storm made its way across the largely uninhabited Florida peninsula over the next two days, and although weakened by the time it emerged in the Atlantic Ocean, it caused substantial damage on the east coast as well. Early Florida pioneer William Whitaker called the storm "the granddaddy of all hurricanes."

== Meteorological history ==
The storm appears to have formed in the central Gulf of Mexico before moving northeast to make landfall near Clearwater, Florida. It then crossed the Florida peninsula and exited near Cape Canaveral. After moving into the extreme western Atlantic, the cyclone continued to the northeast just offshore of the East Coast of the United States to the Grand Banks of Newfoundland.

== Impact ==
=== Gulf of Mexico and Florida ===
A weather station at Fort Brooke in modern downtown Tampa measured a minimum pressure of 28.18 inches of mercury (954 mb) and peak winds of 72 miles per hour (116 km/h) on September 23, though the anemometer ceased functioning before the height of the storm. By making landfall just north of the mouth of Tampa Bay, the counter-clockwise rotation of the storm pushed the waters of the Gulf of Mexico across the barrier islands and onto the mainland of modern Pinellas County and pushed the shallow waters of Tampa Bay into Fort Brooke and the surrounding small settlement of Tampa Town, producing the highest storm surges ever recorded in the region. The water near Fort Brooke at the mouth of the Hillsborough River rose about 15 feet (4.6 m), the Interbay Peninsula where South Tampa and MacDill Air Force Base currently reside was mostly submerged as "Old Tampa Bay and Hillsborough Bay met", and the peninsula of modern Pinellas County was inundated "to the waist". The storm destroyed the fishing rancho of Antonio Máximo Hernández, reputedly lower Pinellas' first white settler, forcing him to emigrate permanently. The storm almost obliterated the citrus crop and destroyed the main house at St. Helena plantation on the northwest corner of Tampa Bay — now part of Safety Harbor — forcing the residents to shelter on an elevated Tocobaga midden. Even so, they nearly drowned as the storm tide eroded part of the five-hundred-year-old mound. Winds also felled almost all of the trees along what is now Indian Rocks Road in Largo.

General R. D. A. Wade, commanding at Fort Brooke, reported the destruction of the wharves, public buildings, and storehouses with very few structures remaining. B. P. Curry, the fort's assistant surgeon, reported the hospital destroyed. Only five houses were left standing in the town of Tampa, and they were all damaged. The water rose twelve feet higher than had ever been recorded, and strong winds downed many ancient live oak trees in and around the fort.

The storm substantially altered the coastal geography of the Tampa Bay area, cutting new inlets, filling in others, and altering the shape of bays and keys, thereby making navigational charts useless to mariners. Allen's Creek was widened from less than 200 feet (61.0 m) to about half a mile at its mouth. Passage Key, between Egmont Key and Anna Maria, was obliterated but reformed later. The storm created what would become known as "Soldier's Hole" at Mullet Key, so called because soldiers at Fort De Soto used it as a swimming hole. An inlet at John's Pass was cut by the surge but has since shifted north. The storm destroyed the lighthouse on Egmont Key, and the keeper (Marvel Edwards) rode out the hurricane in a rowboat tied to a palm tree. The end of the rope was later found 9 ft (2.74 m) off the ground, which had an elevation of about 6 ft (1.83 m).

At Englewood, Stump Pass was cut. Casey's Pass was opened at Venice. New Pass was opened between Sarasota Bay and the Gulf, splitting Palm Island into Longboat and Lido Keys. Farther south, the storm significantly damaged the Charlotte Harbor area near present-day Fort Myers. Elsewhere, ships also encountered the storm. A brig, sighted in the Gulf of Mexico near Cedar Key, encountered the storm while at most 80 miles (129 km) from St. Marks, Florida; the ship lost its mast to the storm.

Damage on the east coast may have been less severe, but the storm still produced significant effects and was described in the Savannah Republican as, "blowing 'great guns' – the hardest blow felt [on the St. Johns River] for several years". It blew down houses in Jacksonville and caused flooding in St. Augustine, as well as interference with shipping on the St. Johns River.

== See also ==
- 1840s Atlantic hurricane seasons
- Saffir–Simpson scale
