= Redington Beach, Florida =

Town in the state of Florida, United States

- Town
- Town of Redington Beach
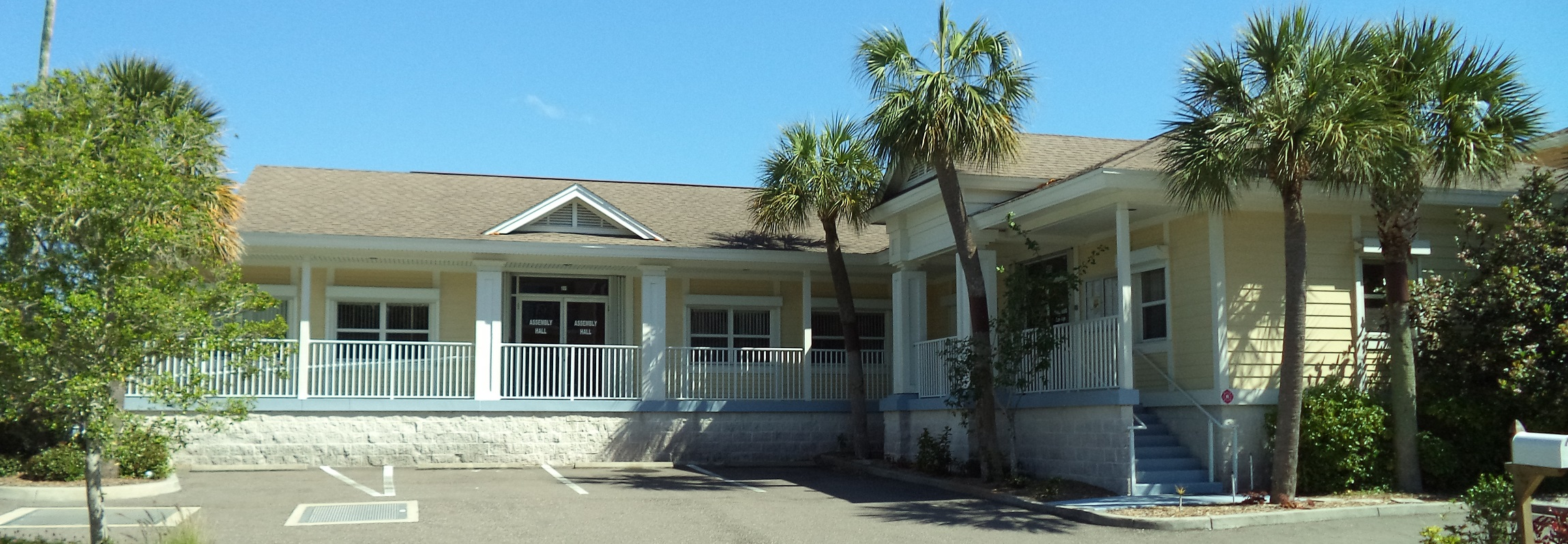
- Redington Beach Town Hall

- Seal

- Location in Pinellas County and the state of Florida
- Coordinates: 27°48′36″N 82°48′46″W
- Country: United States
- State: Florida
- County: Pinellas
- Platted: 1935
- Incorporated: 1944
- Formally Incorporated: 1945

Government
  - Type: Mayor-Commission
  - Mayor: David Will
  - Vice Mayor: Tim Thompson
  - Commissioners: Tim Kornijtschuk, James "Jim" Murray, and Richard "Rich" Cariello
  - Town Clerk: Adriana Nieves
  - Town Attorney: Robert Eschenfelder

Area
  - Total: 1.31 sq mi (3.39 km^{2})
  - Land: 0.36 sq mi (0.93 km^{2})
  - Water: 0.95 sq mi (2.46 km^{2})
- Elevation: 3 ft (0.91 m)

Population (2020)
  - Total: 1,376
  - Density: 3,833.6/sq mi (1,480.17/km^{2})
- Time zone: UTC-5 (Eastern (EST))
  - Summer (DST): UTC-4 (EDT)
- ZIP code: 33708
- Area code: 727
- FIPS code: 12-59725
- GNIS feature ID: 2407189
- Website: www.townofredingtonbeach.com

Redington Beach is a town in Pinellas County, Florida, United States. It is part of the Tampa–St. Petersburg–Clearwater Metropolitan Statistical Area, more commonly called the Tampa Bay Area. The population was 1,376 at the 2020 census.

== Geography ==
According to the United States Census Bureau, the town has a total area of 1.3 sq mi (3.4 km^{2}), of which 0.4 sq mi (1.0 km^{2}) is land and 0.9 sq mi (2.3 km^{2}) (71.54%) is water.

=== Climate ===
The climate in this area is characterized by hot, humid summers and generally mild winters. According to the Köppen climate classification, the Town of Redington Beach has a humid subtropical climate zone (Cfa).

== Demographics ==
Historical population
Census	Pop.	Note	%±
1950	384		—
1960	1,368		256.3%
1970	1,583		15.7%
1980	1,708		7.9%
1990	1,626		−4.8%
2000	1,539		−5.4%
2010	1,427		−7.3%
2020	1,376		−3.6%
U.S. Decennial Census

=== Racial and ethnic composition ===
Redington Beach racial composition (Hispanics excluded from racial categories) (NH = Non-Hispanic)
Race	Pop 2010	Pop 2020	% 2010	% 2020
White (NH)	1,310	1,206	91.80%	87.65%
Black or African American (NH)	5	7	0.35%	0.51%
Native American or Alaska Native (NH)	1	2	0.07%	0.15%
Asian (NH)	36	21	2.52%	1.53%
Pacific Islander or Native Hawaiian (NH)	0	0	0.00%	0.00%
Some other race (NH)	0	3	0.00%	0.22%
Two or more races/Multiracial (NH)	21	57	1.47%	4.14%
Hispanic or Latino (any race)	54	80	3.78%	5.81%
Total	1,427	1,376		

=== 2020 census ===
As of the 2020 census, Redington Beach had a population of 1,376. The median age was 58.2 years. 11.6% of residents were under the age of 18 and 31.5% of residents were 65 years of age or older. For every 100 females there were 89.5 males, and for every 100 females age 18 and over there were 88.1 males age 18 and over.

100.0% of residents lived in urban areas, while 0.0% lived in rural areas.

There were 670 households in Redington Beach, of which 16.4% had children under the age of 18 living in them. Of all households, 53.6% were married-couple households, 13.0% were households with a male householder and no spouse or partner present, and 25.1% were households with a female householder and no spouse or partner present. About 27.7% of all households were made up of individuals and 14.8% had someone living alone who was 65 years of age or older.

There were 956 housing units, of which 29.9% were vacant. The homeowner vacancy rate was 2.5% and the rental vacancy rate was 19.5%.

According to the United States Census Bureau estimates for 2020, there were 402 families residing in the town.

=== 2010 census ===
As of the 2010 United States census, there were 1,427 people, 618 households, and 417 families residing in the town.

=== 2000 census ===
As of the census of 2000, there were 1,539 people, 724 households, and 464 families residing in the town. The population density was 4,228.5 inhabitants per square mile (1,632.6/km^{2}). There were 987 housing units at an average density of 2,711.8 per square mile (1,047.0/km^{2}). The racial makeup of the town was 97.14% White, 0.45% African American, 0.13% Native American, 1.43% Asian, and 0.84% from two or more races. Hispanic or Latino of any race were 2.92% of the population.

In 2000, there were 724 households, out of which 16.9% had children under the age of 18 living with them, 54.3% were married couples living together, 7.7% had a female householder with no husband present, and 35.9% were non-families. 26.7% of all households were made up of individuals, and 11.0% had someone living alone who was 65 years of age or older. The average household size was 2.13 and the average family size was 2.54.

In 2000, in the town, the population was spread out, with 14.0% under the age of 18, 3.5% from 18 to 24, 23.3% from 25 to 44, 35.3% from 45 to 64, and 24.0% who were 65 years of age or older. The median age was 50 years. For every 100 females, there were 86.3 males. For every 100 females age 18 and over, there were 84.1 males.

In 2000, the median income for a household in the town was $54,830, and the median income for a family was $60,795. Males had a median income of $45,921 versus $27,500 for females. The per capita income for the town was $38,265. About 4.1% of families and 5.7% of the population were below the poverty line, including 5.1% of those under age 18 and 8.7% of those age 65 or over.

== Education ==
All public schools are served by the Pinellas County Schools district.

=== Library ===
The community is served by the Gulf Beaches Public Library, located in nearby Madeira Beach. The library is supported by Madeira Beach, Redington Beach, North Redington Beach, Redington Shores, and Treasure Island. These five communities have combined their resources in order to fund the library, which they would not be able to maintain individually.

== Notable people ==
- Thomas L. Holling, former Mayor of Buffalo, New York
- John J. Savage, former Florida politician
