= Madeira Beach, Florida =

- City
- City of Madeira Beach
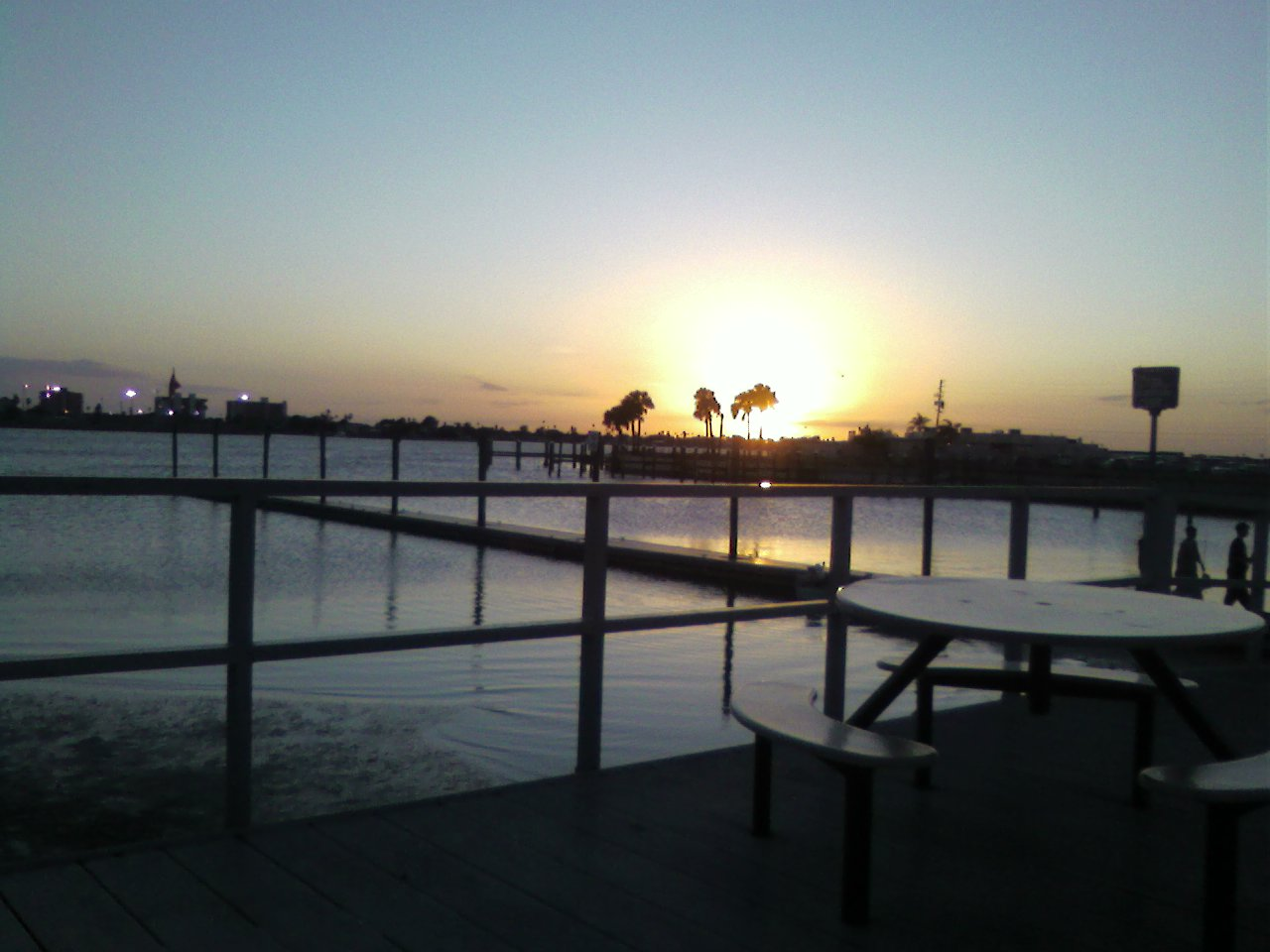
- Sunset at Madeira Beach

- Seal
- Nickname: Mad Beach
- Motto(s): "Two Miles Long and a Smile Wide"
- Location in Pinellas County and the state of Florida
- Coordinates: 27°47′45″N 82°47′32″W
- Country: United States
- State: Florida
- County: Pinellas
- Settled: 1926
- Incorporated (town): May 5, 1947
- Incorporated (city): August 8, 1951
- Named for: Madeira

Government
  - Type: Commissioner-Manager
  - Mayor: Anne-Marie Brooks
  - Vice Mayor: Eddie McGeehen
  - Commission Members: Chuck Dillon, David Tagliarini, and Housh Ghovaee
  - City Manager: Michael S. Helfrich
  - City Clerk: Clara VanBlargan

Area
  - Total: 3.19 sq mi (8.27 km^{2})
  - Land: 0.98 sq mi (2.54 km^{2})
  - Water: 2.21 sq mi (5.72 km^{2})
- Elevation: 3 ft (0.91 m)

Population (2020)
  - Total: 3,895
  - Density: 3,967.1/sq mi (1,531.69/km^{2})
- Time zone: UTC-5 (Eastern (EST))
  - Summer (DST): UTC-4 (EDT)
- ZIP codes: 33708, 33738
- Area code: 727
- FIPS code: 12-42400
- GNIS feature ID: 2404988
- Website: www.madeirabeachfl.gov

Madeira Beach (/məˈdɛərə/ mə-DAIR-ə) is a city in Pinellas County, Florida, United States, bordered on the west by the Gulf of Mexico, and on the east by St. Petersburg. As of the 2020 census, the population was 3,895. The city's entertainment district, John's Pass, is located on the Intracoastal Waterway. The city is often referred to by locals as "Mad Beach". It is named after the Portuguese island of Madeira.

== History ==
Prior to European colonization, the area that makes up what is now Madeira Beach was rarely permanently inhabited. The local Tocobaga chiefdom used the land to harvest seafood, but did not live on the land.

The modern shape of Madeira Beach was formed by a hurricane, the "Gale of '48", carving out the strait now known as John's Pass. The new waterway was named after an early homesteader, John (Juan) Levique.

Several aborted attempts to settle the area occurred in the early 1900s, but it was not until 1926 that a causeway was built between the mainland and Madeira Beach, allowing for the first houses to be constructed in the area. A bridge was built crossing John's Pass a year later. The Town of Madeira Beach was officially incorporated as a municipality on May 5, 1947. The town officially became the City of Madeira Beach on August 8, 1951, when it annexed the nearby town of South Madeira. Significant dredging operations on the Intracoastal causeway dramatically expanded the land area of Madeira Beach in the 1950s and 1960s. Additionally, the city annexed some land on mainland Pinellas in 1955 for the construction of a shopping center and a school, now Madeira Beach Fundamental School.

The town saw significant construction in the 1970s and 1980s, including the construction of many beach condos and hotels along the beach. Today, it remains a sleepy beach town, popular as a vacation destination.

== Geography ==
According to the United States Census Bureau, the city has a total area of 3.3 square miles (8.5 km^{2}), of which 1.0 square mile (2.6 km^{2}) is land, and 2.2 square miles (5.7 km^{2}) (68.50%) are water.

The city is located on a barrier island between the Gulf of Mexico to the southwest, and the Boca Ciega Bay to the northeast. One bridge, the Tom Stuart Causeway, connects Madeira Beach to the mainland, in the unincorporated community of Bay Pines. To the northwest of Madeira Beach is the town of Redington Beach, and to the southeast, across the inlet of John's Pass, is the city of Treasure Island.

=== Climate ===
The City of Madeira Beach is in a humid subtropical climate zone with a Köppen Climate Classification of "Cfa" (C = mild temperate, f = fully humid, and a = hot summer).

== Demographics ==
Historical population
Census	Pop.	Note	%±
1950	916		—
1960	3,943		330.5%
1970	4,177		5.9%
1980	4,520		8.2%
1990	4,225		−6.5%
2000	4,511		6.8%
2010	4,263		−5.5%
2020	3,895		−8.6%
U.S. Decennial Census

=== Racial and ethnic composition ===
Madeira Beach racial composition (Hispanics excluded from racial categories) (NH = Non-Hispanic)
Race	Pop 2010	Pop 2020	% 2010	% 2020
White (NH)	3,924	3,402	92.05%	87.34%
Black or African American (NH)	37	37	0.87%	0.95%
Native American or Alaska Native (NH)	17	14	0.40%	0.36%
Asian (NH)	44	52	1.03%	1.34%
Pacific Islander or Native Hawaiian (NH)	1	1	0.02%	0.03%
Some other race (NH)	2	29	0.05%	0.74%
Two or more races/Multiracial (NH)	53	124	1.24%	3.18%
Hispanic or Latino (any race)	185	236	4.34%	6.06%
Total	4,263	3,895	100.00%	100.00%

=== 2020 census ===
As of the 2020 census, Madeira Beach had a population of 3,895. The median age was 58.1 years. 7.2% of residents were under the age of 18 and 31.7% of residents were 65 years of age or older. For every 100 females there were 102.0 males, and for every 100 females age 18 and over there were 100.8 males age 18 and over.

As of 2020, 100.0% of residents lived in urban areas, while 0.0% lived in rural areas.

In 2020, there were 2,149 households in Madeira Beach, of which 10.5% had children under the age of 18 living in them. Of all households, 40.5% were married-couple households, 26.0% were households with a male householder and no spouse or partner present, and 25.5% were households with a female householder and no spouse or partner present. About 39.5% of all households were made up of individuals and 16.4% had someone living alone who was 65 years of age or older.

In 2020, there were 3,937 housing units, of which 45.4% were vacant. The homeowner vacancy rate was 3.6% and the rental vacancy rate was 30.4%.

According to the 2020 American Community Survey 5-year estimates, there were 1,310 families residing in the city.

=== 2010 census ===
As of the 2010 census, there were 4,263 people, 2,278 households, and 1,100 families residing in the city.

=== 2000 census ===
At the 2000 census, there were 4,511 people in 2,528 households, including 1,122 families, in the city. The population density was 4,392.0 inhabitants per square mile (1,695.8/km^{2}). There were 3,976 housing units, at an average density of 3,871.1 per square mile (1,494.6/km^{2}). The racial makeup of the city was: 97.05% White, 0.27% African American, 0.31% Native American, 0.58% Asian, 0.04% Pacific Islander, 0.67% from other races, and 1.09% from two or more races. Hispanic or Latino of any race made up 2.37%.

Of the 2,528 households in 2000, 9.1% had children under the age of 18 living with them; 35.6% were married couples living together; 5.6% had a female householder with no husband present; and 55.6% were non-families. 42.4% of households were one person, and 12.2% were one person aged 65 or older. The average household size was 1.78, and the average family size was 2.36.

In 2000, the age distribution was 8.2% under the age of 18; 4.8% from 18 to 24; 29.3% from 25 to 44; 35.7% from 45 to 64; and 22.0% that are 65 or older. The median age was 48 years. For every 100 females, there were 111.3 males. For every 100 females age 18 and over, there were 110.2 males.

In 2000, the median household income was $36,671, and the median family income was $50,833. Males had a median income of $32,353, versus $27,455 for females. The per capita income for the city was $30,097. About 4.1% of families and 9.8% of the population were below the poverty line, including 4.1% of those under age 18, and 12.2% of those age 65 or over.

== Points of interest ==
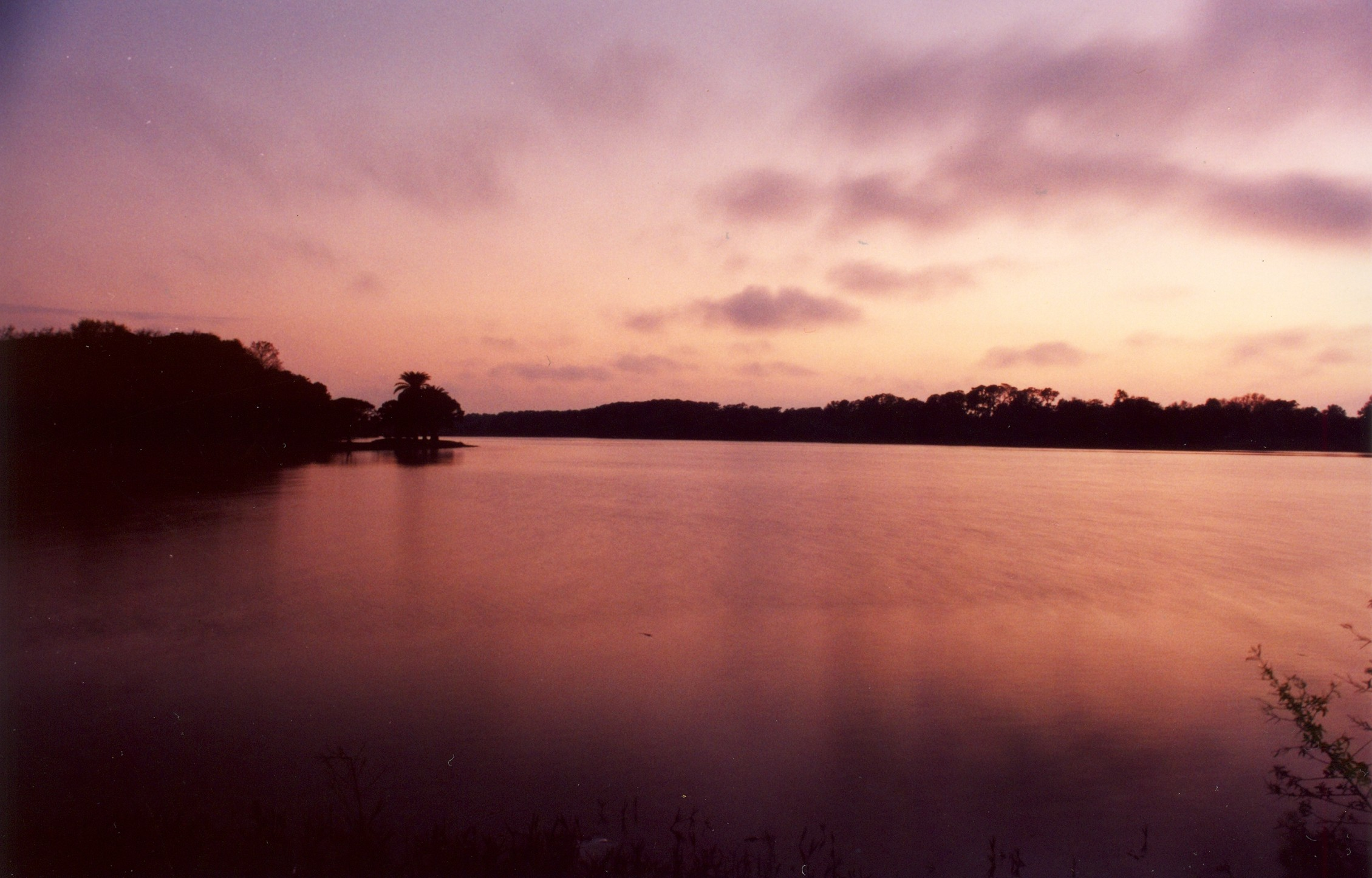
Taylor Lake sunset

=== Chicken Church ===
Madeira Beach's Church By The Sea is a non-denominational church serving the gulf beaches including Madeira Beach, Treasure Island, Redington, St. Pete Beach, as well as the cities of Seminole and St. Petersburg. Construction for the church lasted from 1944 to 1946.

The church has become a tourist attraction because its tower resembles a chicken; it is known colloquially as the "Chicken Church".

=== John's Pass Marina ===
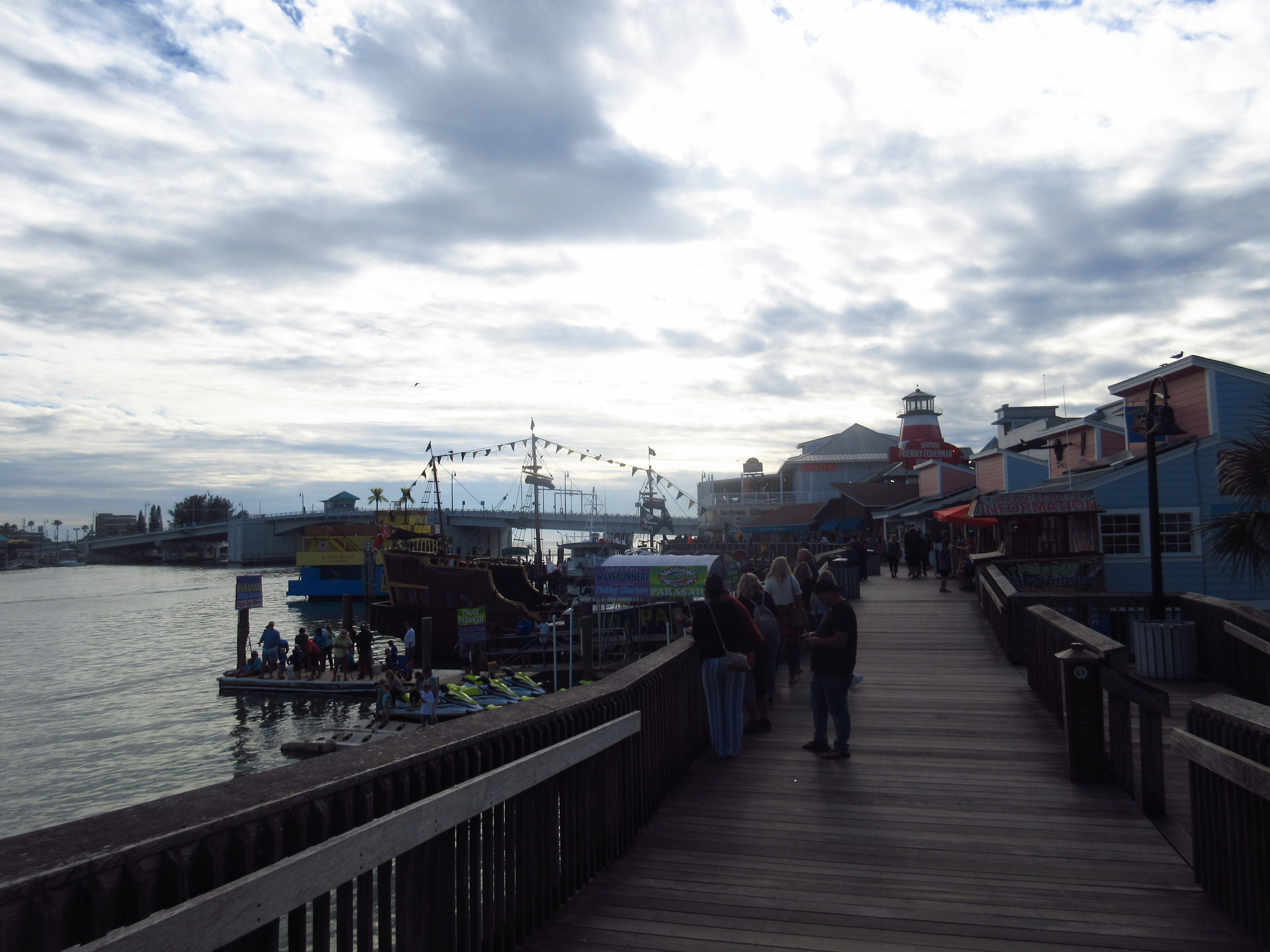
John's Pass boardwalk

On September 24, 1848, a strong hurricane struck the West Coast of Florida. It separated the barrier island on the coast and created a waterway known today as John's Pass. John Levique, along with Joseph Silva, was the one who discovered it and named it after himself, and it is now a federally owned canal.

In 2022, the Governor of Florida, Ron DeSantis, included in the budget $1,500,000 to dredge John's Pass.

== See also ==
- Gulf Beaches Public Library
