= Bay Pines, Florida =

- Census-designated place
- Location of Bay Pines in Pinellas County, Florida.
- Coordinates: 27°48′24″N 82°46′31″W
- Country: United States
- State: Florida
- County: Pinellas

Area
  - Total: 2.22 sq mi (5.74 km^{2})
  - Land: 1.30 sq mi (3.36 km^{2})
  - Water: 0.92 sq mi (2.38 km^{2})
- Elevation: 10 ft (3.0 m)

Population (2020)
  - Total: 3,106
  - Density: 2,393.9/sq mi (924.28/km^{2})
- Time zone: UTC-5 (Eastern (EST))
  - Summer (DST): UTC-4 (EDT)
- ZIP code: 33744
- Area code: 727
- FIPS code: 12-04200
- GNIS feature ID: 2402666

Bay Pines is a census-designated place (CDP) in Pinellas County, Florida, United States. As of the 2020 census, Bay Pines had a population of 3,106. The community is home to Bay Pines Veterans Hospital and Bay Pines National Cemetery.

== Historic district ==
The Bay Pines Veterans Administration Home and Hospital Historic District is a U.S. historic district located at 10000 Bay Pines Blvd. in Bay Pines, Florida. The district contains prehistoric aboriginal sites, and 14 Mediterranean Revival style hospital buildings constructed from the 1930s.

It was added to the National Register of Historic Places on June 27, 2012.

== Geography ==
According to the United States Census Bureau, the CDP has a total area of 5.8 km^{2} (2.2 mi^{2}), of which 3.6 km^{2} (1.4 mi^{2}) is land and 2.2 km^{2} (0.9 mi^{2}) (38.22%) is water.

== Demographics ==
Historical population
Census	Pop.	Note	%±
1980	5,757		—
1990	4,171		−27.5%
2000	3,065		−26.5%
2010	2,931		−4.4%
2020	3,106		6.0%

=== 2020 census ===
As of the 2020 census, Bay Pines had a population of 3,106. The median age was 56.5 years. 14.2% of residents were under the age of 18 and 33.0% of residents were 65 years of age or older. For every 100 females there were 99.9 males, and for every 100 females age 18 and over there were 97.1 males age 18 and over.

100.0% of residents lived in urban areas, while 0.0% lived in rural areas.

There were 1,465 households in Bay Pines, of which 16.0% had children under the age of 18 living in them. Of all households, 42.9% were married-couple households, 22.1% were households with a male householder and no spouse or partner present, and 27.8% were households with a female householder and no spouse or partner present. About 36.6% of all households were made up of individuals and 23.7% had someone living alone who was 65 years of age or older.

There were 1,737 housing units, of which 15.7% were vacant. The homeowner vacancy rate was 1.5% and the rental vacancy rate was 11.1%.

Racial composition as of the 2020 census
Race	Number	Percent
White	2,758	88.8%
Black or African American	45	1.4%
American Indian and Alaska Native	9	0.3%
Asian	57	1.8%
Native Hawaiian and Other Pacific Islander	0	0.0%
Some other race	40	1.3%
Two or more races	197	6.3%
Hispanic or Latino (of any race)	166	5.3%

=== 2000 census ===
At the 2000 census there were 3,065 people, 1,465 households, and 879 families in the CDP. The population density was 851.4/km^{2} (2,198.9/mi^{2}). There were 1,728 housing units at an average density of 480.0/km^{2} (1,239.7/mi^{2}). The racial makeup of the CDP was 97.91% White, 0.23% African American, 0.20% Native American, 0.46% Asian, 0.46% from other races, and 0.75% from two or more races. Hispanic or Latino of any race were 2.35%.

Of the 1,465 households 17.6% had children under the age of 18 living with them, 50.0% were married couples living together, 6.7% had a female householder with no husband present, and 40.0% were non-families. 33.6% of households were one person and 19.5% were one person aged 65 or older. The average household size was 2.09 and the average family size was 2.66.

The age distribution was 15.8% under the age of 18, 4.3% from 18 to 24, 22.5% from 25 to 44, 26.0% from 45 to 64, and 31.4% 65 or older. The median age was 50 years. For every 100 females, there were 91.3 males. For every 100 females age 18 and over, there were 87.6 males.

The median household income was $32,456 and the median family income was $38,412. Males had a median income of $31,447 versus $24,886 for females. The per capita income for the CDP was $20,041. About 1.2% of families and 3.5% of the population were below the poverty line, including 2.0% of those under age 18 and 4.4% of those age 65 or over.
