= List of bridges in Florida =

The U.S. state of Florida, due to being a peninsula and its proximity to the Gulf of Mexico and Atlantic Ocean, has many bridges of varying lengths. The longest bridge in the state is the Seven Mile Bridge located in the Florida Keys. This list includes overwater automobile bridges 2,640 feet (800 m) or longer.

== Main list ==
Rank	Bridge	Spans	Length (feet)	Length (meters)	Clearance (feet)	Clearance (meters)	Carries	Date
1	Seven Mile Bridge	Moser Channel	35,867	10,932.3	65	19.8	U.S. Route 1 (Overseas Highway)	1982
2	Sunshine Skyway Bridge	Tampa Bay	21,875	6,667.5	175	53.3	Interstate 275 & U.S. Route 19	1986
3	St. George Island Bridge	Apalachicola Bay	21,542	6,566	65	19.8	State Road 300	2003
4	Mid-Bay Bridge	Choctawhatchee Bay	19,267	5,872.6	64	19.5	State Road 293	1993
5	Garcon Point Bridge	East Bay	18,427	5,616.5	65	19.8	State Road 281	1999
6	Buckman Bridge (westbound)	St. Johns River	16,321	4,974.6	65	19.8	Interstate 295 West Beltway (northbound)	1969
7	Buckman Bridge (eastbound)	St. Johns River	16,299	4,967.9	65	19.8	Interstate 295 West Beltway (southbound)	1969
8 =	Howard Frankland Bridge (eastbound)	Tampa Bay	15,872	4,837.8	44	13.4	Interstate 275 (northbound)	1959
8 =	Howard Frankland Bridge (westbound)	Tampa Bay	15,872	4,837.8	50	15.2	Interstate 275 (southbound)	1991
10	Pensacola Bay Bridge (Note: This is for the former span that was recently replaced. However, due to how recently the new span was completed, it will not be listed on the FDOT Straight Line Diagrams until the next statewide bridge audit.) (Three Mile Bridge)	Pensacola Bay	15,634	4,765.2	50 (Note: Since the waters under this bridge are either non-navigable or not frequently requested, Garmin does not have a separate page for this structure. However, heights are listed directly on the main US map.)	15.2	U.S. Route 98	1960
11	Gandy Bridge (eastbound)	Tampa Bay	14,795	4,509.5	43	13.1	U.S. Route 92 (eastbound)	1975
12	John Gorrie Memorial Bridge (eastern span)	Apalachicola Bay	14,172	4,319.6	16	4.9	U.S. Routes 98 & 319	1988
13	Gandy Bridge (westbound)	Tampa Bay	13,881	4,230.9	43	13.1	U.S. Route 92 (westbound)	1996
14	Escambia Bay Bridge (eastbound)	Escambia Bay	13,818	4,211.7	50	15.2	Interstate 10 (eastbound)	2006
15	Escambia Bay Bridge (westbound)	Escambia Bay	13,739	4,187.6	50	15.2	Interstate 10 (westbound)	2007
16 =	Bayside Bridge (northbound)	Tampa Bay	13,232	4,033.1	47	14.3	Pinellas County Road 611 (northbound)	1993
16 =	Bayside Bridge (southbound)	Tampa Bay	13,232	4,033.1	47	14.3	Pinellas County Road 611 (southbound)	1993
18	Dante B. Fascel Bridge	Long Key Channel	12,176	3,711.2	23	14.3	U.S. Route 1 (Overseas Highway)	1981
19	Clyde B. Wells Bridge (northbound)	Choctawhatchee Bay	12,059	3,675.6	66	20.1	U.S. Route 331	2019
20	Dames Point Bridge	St. Johns River	10,645	3,244.6	174	53	Interstate 295 East Beltway	1989
21	Midpoint Memorial Bridge	Caloosahatchee River	10,243 (Note: This bridge is owned either by a county or city government, by a private organization, or jointly between states, and therefore not listed on the FDOT Straight Line Diagrams in its entirety. This length is approximated from measurement data taken from Google Maps.)	3,122.1	55	16.8	Lee County Road 884	1997
22 =	Trammell Bridge (eastbound)	Apalachicola River	8,432	2,570	55	16.8	State Road 20	1998
22 =	Trammell Bridge (westbound)	Apalachicola River	8,432	2,570	50	15.2	State Road 20	1938
24	Interstate 75 Bridge	Peace River	8,068	2,459.1	45	13.7	Interstate 75	2003
25 =	Lake Jesup Bridge (northbound)	Lake Jesup	7,941	2,420.4	6	1.8	State Road 417	1993
25 =	Lake Jesup Bridge (southbound)	Lake Jesup	7,941	2,420.4	6	1.8	State Road 417	1993
27	Tamiami Trail (western bridge)	Everglades National Park	7,566	2,306.1	10	3	U.S. Route 41	2020
28	Clyde B. Wells Bridge (southbound)	Choctawhatchee Bay	7,540	2,298.2	66	20.1	U.S. Route 331	1991
29	Jewfish Creek Bridge	Jewfish Creek	7,508	2,288.4	67	20.4	U.S. Route 1 (Overseas Highway)	2008
30	John E. Mathews Bridge	St. Johns River	7,376	2,248.2	148	45.1	State Road 115 (Arlington Expressway)	1953
31 =	Bahia Honda Bridge (eastbound)	Bahia Honda Key	6,716	2,047	20	6.1	U.S. Route 1 (northbound) (Overseas Highway)	1972
31 =	Bahia Honda Bridge (westbound)	Bahia Honda Key	6,716	2,047	20	6.1	U.S. Route 1 (southbound) (Overseas Highway)	1972
33	Shands Bridge	St. Johns River	6,663	2,030.9	45	13.7	State Road 16	1961
34	Gilchrist Bridge	Peace River	6,378	1,944	45	13.7	U.S. Route 41 (southbound)	1976
35	Dewey M. Johnson Bridge (westbound)	Apalachicola River	6,098	1,858.7	37	11.3	Interstate 10 (westbound)	1978
36	E.N. Walker Bridge	Ochlockonee Bay	5,856	1,784.9	35	10.7	U.S. Route 98	1990
37	Dewey M. Johnson Bridge (eastbound)	Apalachicola River	5,475	1,668.8	37	11.3	Interstate 10 (eastbound)	1978
38	Edison Bridge (northbound)	Caloosahatchee River	5,280	1,609.3	56	17.1	U.S. Route 41 Business (northbound)	1992
39	Tamiami Trail (eastern bridge)	Everglades National Park	5,275	1,607.8	10	3	U.S. Route 41	2013
40	Barron Collier Bridge	Peace River	5,137	1,565.8	45	13.7	U.S. Route 41 (northbound)	1983
41	Nassau Sound Bridge	Nassau Sound	5,132	1,564.2	15	4.6	State Roads 105 & A1A	1999
42	Caloosahatchee Bridge	Caloosahatchee River	4,969	1,514.6	55	16.8	U.S. Route 41	1962
43	Channel No. 5 Bridge	Channel No. 5	4,937	1,504.8	65	19.8	U.S. Route 1 (Overseas Highway)	1982
44	17th Street Bridge	Indian River	4,722	1,439.3	65	19.8	State Road 656	1979
45 =	Ernest F. Lyons Bridge	Indian River Lagoon	4,657	1,419.5	65	19.8	State Road A1A	2006
45 =	Tamiami Trail (central bridge)	Everglades National Park	4,657	1,419.5	10	3	U.S. Route 41	2020
47	Edison Bridge (southbound)	Caloosahatchee River	4,615	1,406.7	56	17.1	U.S. Route 41 Business (southbound)	1993
48 =	J. Turner Butler Bridge (eastbound)	Intracoastal Waterway	4,594	1,400.3	65	19.8	State Road 202 (eastbound)	1988
48 =	J. Turner Butler Bridge (westbound)	Intracoastal Waterway	4,594	1,400.3	65	19.8	State Road 202 (westbound)	1988
50	Niles Channel Bridge	Niles Channel	4,546	1,385.6	40	12.2	U.S. Route 1 (Overseas Highway)	1983
51	Ocklawaha River Bridge	Ocklawaha River (originally intended for Cross Florida Barge Canal)	4,467	1,361.5	68	20.7	Marion County Road 316	1969
52	Lillian Bridge	Perdido Bay	4,096	1,248.5	39	11.9	U.S. Route 98 (Florida & Alabama)	1981
53	Memorial Bridge	St. Johns River	4,023	1,226.2	65	19.8	U.S. Route 17	1977
54 =	Interstate 75 Bridge (northbound)	Caloosahatchee River	3,918	1,194.2	55	16.8	Interstate 75 (northbound)	1976
54 =	Interstate 75 Bridge (southbound)	Caloosahatchee River	3,918	1,194.2	55	16.8	Interstate 75 (southbound)	1976
56	Sanibel Causeway (span C)	San Carlos Bay	3,880	1,182.6	68	20.7	Causeway Boulevard	2007
57	Bennett Causeway (eastbound)	Indian River Lagoon	3,849	1,173.1	65	19.8	State Road 528 (eastbound) & State Road A1A (southbound)	2006
58	Isaiah D. Hart Bridge	St. Johns River	3,844	1,171.7	141	43	U.S. Route 1 Alternate & State Road 228	1967
59	Francis & Mary Usina Bridge	Tolomato River	3,839	1,170.1	65	19.8	State Road A1A	1995
60	Merrill P. Barber Bridge	Indian River Lagoon	3,833	1,168.3	66	20.1	State Road 60	1995
61	Green Bridge	Manatee River	3,823	1,165.3	41	12.5	U.S. Route 41 Business	1986
62 =	Hathaway Bridge (westbound)	Saint Andrews Bay	3,812	1,161.9	65	19.8	U.S. Route 98 (westbound)	2003
62 =	J.D. Young Bridge (northbound)	Manatee River	3,812	1,161.9	40	12.2	Interstate 75 (northbound)	1980
62 =	J.D. Young Bridge (southbound)	Manatee River	3,812	1,161.9	40	12.2	Interstate 75 (southbound)	1980
65	John Gorrie Memorial Bridge (western span)	Apalachicola River	3,786	1,154	65	19.8	U.S. Route 98	1988
66	George C. Means Memorial Bridge	Lake Jesup	3,740	1,140	25	7.6	State Road 46	2009
67	William M. Powell Bridge	Biscayne Bay	3,698	1,127.1	78	23.8	State Road 913	1970
68 =	Robert L.F. Sikes Bridge (northbound)	Santa Rosa Sound	3,660	1,115.6	65	19.8	Escambia County Road 399 (eastbound)	1974
68 =	Robert L.F. Sikes Bridge (southbound)	Santa Rosa Sound	3,660	1,115.6	65	19.8	Escambia County Road 399 (westbound)	1974
70	D.J. Bailey Memorial Bridge	North Bay	3,596	1,096.1	18	5.5	State Road 77	1998
71	Charles E. Bennet Memorial Bridge	Intracoastal Waterway	3,585	1,092.7	65	19.8	State Road 116	2003
72 =	Mickler O'Connel Bridge (eastbound)	Matanzas River	3,575	1,089.7	65	19.8	State Road 312 (eastbound)	1976
72 =	Mickler O'Connel Bridge (westbound)	Matanzas River	3,575	1,089.7	65	19.8	State Road 312 (westbound)	1999
74	Spanish Harbor Channel Bridge	Spanish Harbor Channel	3,490	1,063.8	11	3.4	U.S. Route 1 (Overseas Highway)	1982
75 =	Cape Coral Bridge (eastbound)	Caloosahatchee River	3,454	1,052.8	55	16.8	Lee County Road 867A (eastbound)	1989
75 =	Cape Coral Bridge (westbound)	Caloosahatchee River	3,454	1,052.8	55	16.8	Lee County Road 867A (westbound)	1963
77	Hathaway Bridge (eastbound)	Saint Andrews Bay	3,385	1,031.7	65	19.8	U.S. Route 98 (eastbound)	2004
78	Belleair Causeway	Intracoastal Waterway	3,346	1,019.9	75	22.9	Pinellas County Road 416	2009
79	Sisters Creek Bridge	Sisters Creek	3,284	1,001	65	19.8	State Road 105	2016
80	Courtney Campbell Causeway	Tampa Bay	3,258	993	45	13.7	State Road 60	1974
81	William T. Marler Bridge (westbound)	Choctawhatchee Bay	3,237	986.6	50	15.2	U.S. Route 98 (westbound)	1971
82	Olan "Rex" Ferguson Bridge	Choctawhatchee River	3,231	984.8	20	6.1	State Road 20	1984
83	A. Max Brewer Bridge	Indian River	3,216	980.2	65	19.8	Brevard County Road 402	2010
84	William T. Marler Bridge (eastbound)	Choctawhatchee Bay	3,184	970.5	50	15.2	U.S. Route 98 (eastbound)	1971
85 =	Thomas J. Shave Jr. Bridge (eastbound)	Amelia River	3,157	962.3	65	19.8	State Roads 200 & A1A (eastbound)	1978
85 =	Thomas J. Shave Jr. Bridge (westbound)	Amelia River	3,157	962.3	65	19.8	State Roads 200 & A1A (westbound)	1978
87	Anna Maria Island Bridge	Sarasota Bay	3,126	952.8	24	7.3	State Road 64	1957
88	George L. Dichenson Bridge	Choctawhatchee River	3,115	949.5	20	6.1	U.S. Route 90	2001
89 =	Blackwater Bay Bridge (eastbound)	Blackwater Bay	3,110	947.9	45	13.7	Interstate 10 (eastbound)	1997
89 =	Blackwater Bay Bridge (westbound)	Blackwater Bay	3,110	947.9	45	13.7	Interstate 10 (westbound)	1997
91	John Ringling Causeway	Sarasota Bay	3,094	943.1	65	19.8	State Road 789	2003
92	Peter P. Cobb Memorial Bridge	Indian River Lagoon	3,089	941.5	65	19.8	State Road A1A	1974
93	Evans Crary Sr., Bridge	St. Lucie River	3,052	930.2	65	19.8	State Road A1A	2001
94	NASA Causeway	Indian River	3,038	926.0	27	8.2	Brevard County Road 405	1964
95	Verle Allyn Pope Bridge	Matanzas River	2,980	908.3	25	7.6	State Road 206	1975
96	Sanibel Causeway (span A)	San Carlos Bay	2,994	912.6	70	21.3	Causeway Boulevard	2007
97	San Pablo River Bridge (westbound)	Intracoastal Waterway	2,955	900.7	65	19.8	State Road 10 (westbound)	2000
98	Eau Gallie Causeway	Indian River Lagoon	2,899	883.6	65	19.8	State Road 518	1988
99 =	Dick Misener Bridge (northbound)	Tampa Bay	2,835	864.1	65	19.8	Interstate 275 & U.S. Route 19 (northbound)	1992
99 =	Dick Misener Bridge (southbound)	Tampa Bay	2,835	864.1	65	19.8	Interstate 275 & U.S. Route 19 (southbound)	1994
101	Card Sound Bridge	Card Sound	2,776	846.1	65	19.8	Miami-Dade County Road 905A	1969
102	Dupont Bridge	Saint Andrews Bay	2,746	837	50	15.2	U.S. Route 98	1965
103	Navarre Beach Causeway	Santa Rosa Sound	2,736	833.9	50	15.2	Santa Rosa County Road 399	1960
104	Bert Dosh Memorial Bridge	Ocklawaha River	2,735	833.6	43	13.1	State Road 40	1972
105	U.S. Route 17 Bridge	Dunns Creek	2,693	820.8	45	13.7	U.S. Route 17	1987
106	State Road 19 Bridge	Cross Florida Barge Canal	2,671	814.1	68	20.7	State Road 19	1967
107 =	Boca Chica Channel Bridge (northbound)	Boca Chica Channel	2,640	804.7	20	6.1	U.S. Route 1 (northbound) (Overseas Highway)	1981
107 =	Boca Chica Channel Bridge (southbound)	Boca Chica Channel	2,640	804.7	20	6.1	U.S. Route 1 (southbound) (Overseas Highway)	1973

== Gallery ==
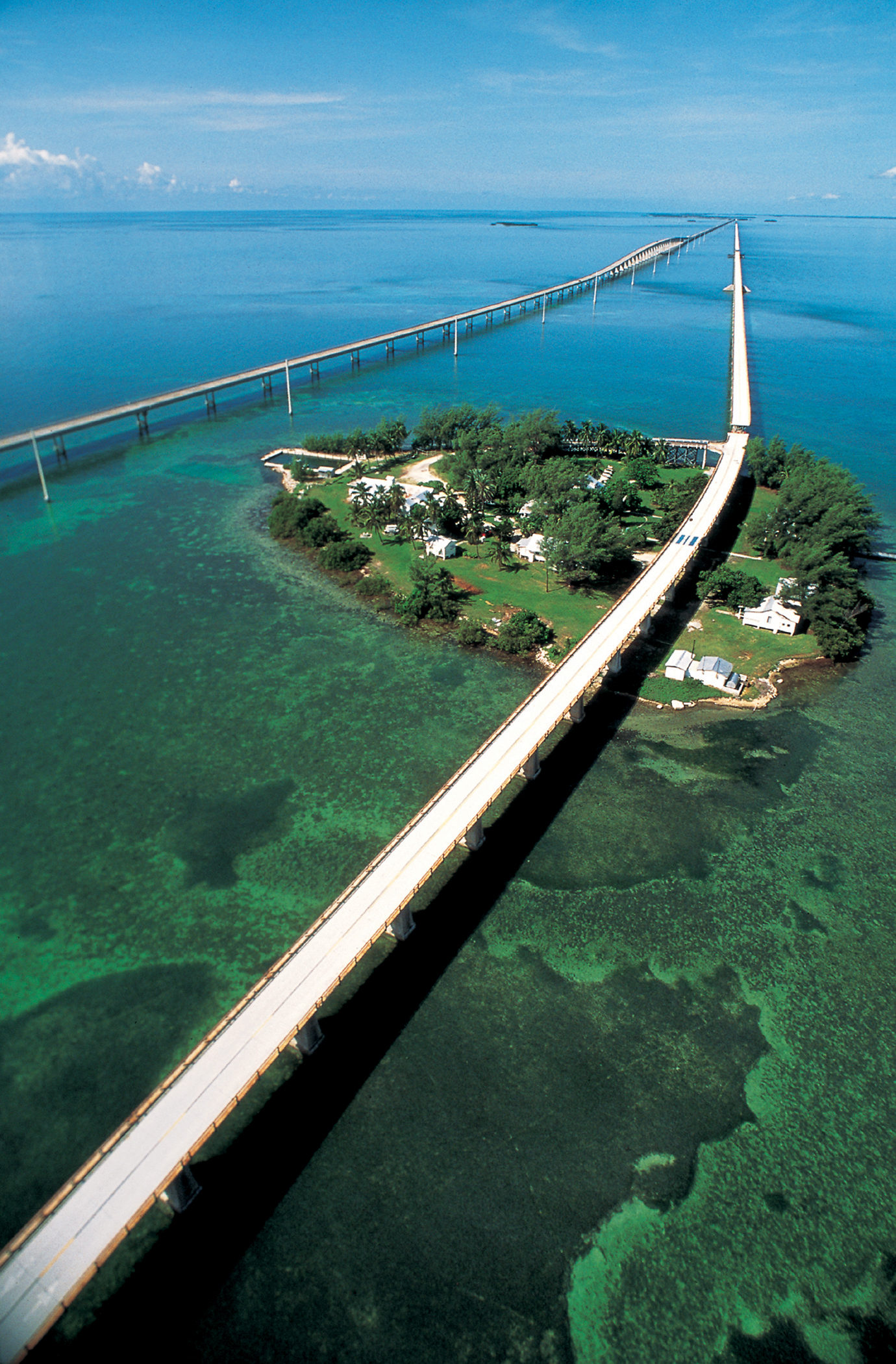
The Seven Mile Bridge is the longest bridge in Florida.

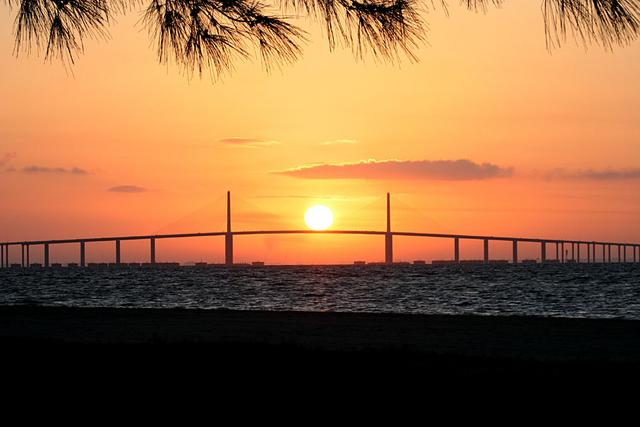
The Sunshine Skyway Bridge, as seen at sunrise from Fort DeSoto Park, is amongst the most recognizable bridges in the United States.

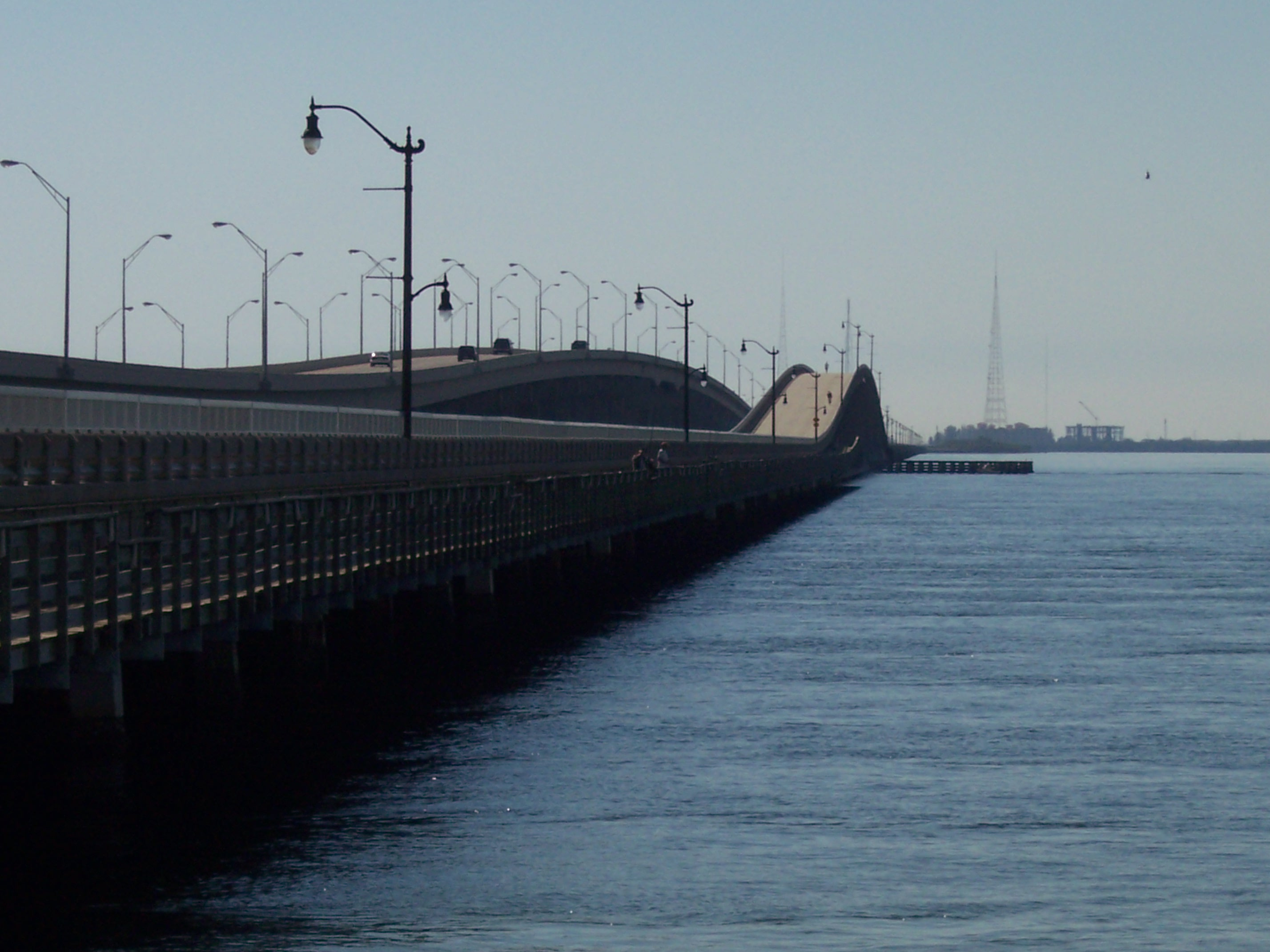
The Gandy Bridge was the first fixed crossing of Tampa Bay, with the original span opening in 1924. The 1956 (foreground, now demolished) and 1996 spans are visible.

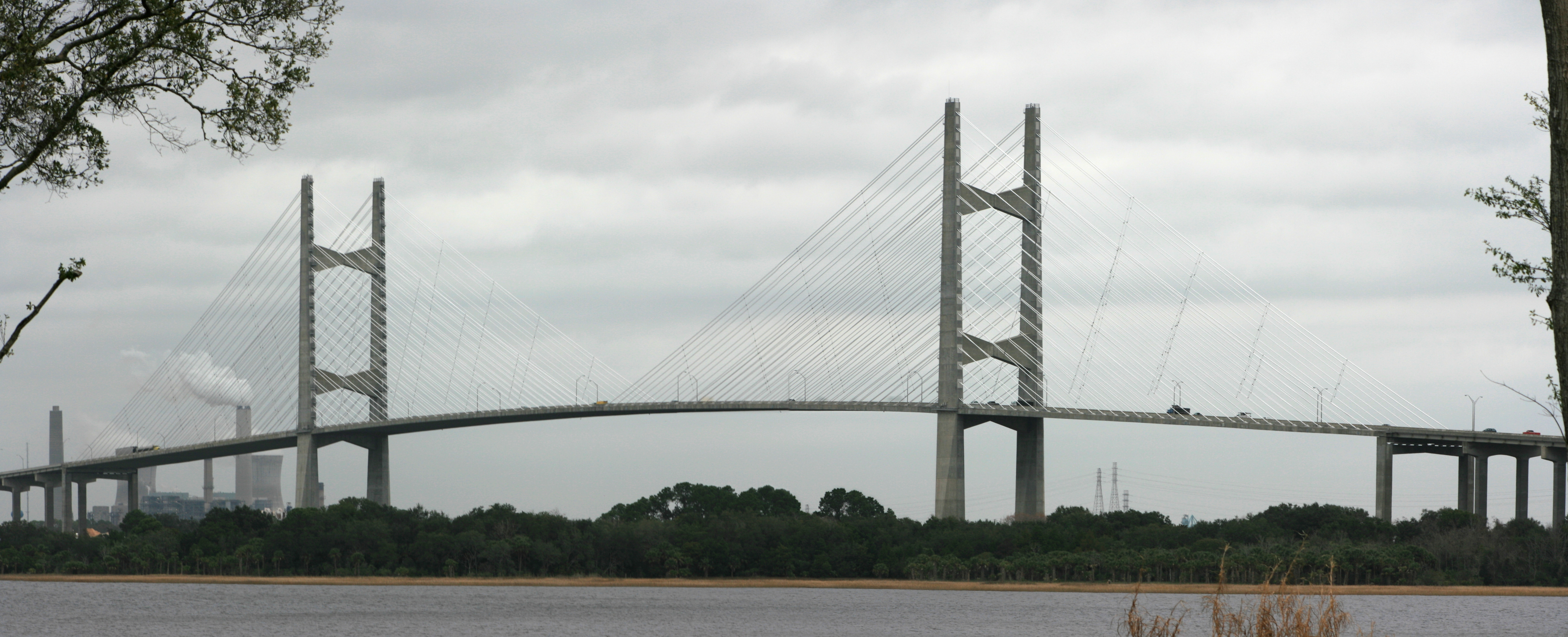
The Dames Point Bridge is one of only two bridges in Florida with more than a 170 ft (51.8m) clearance.

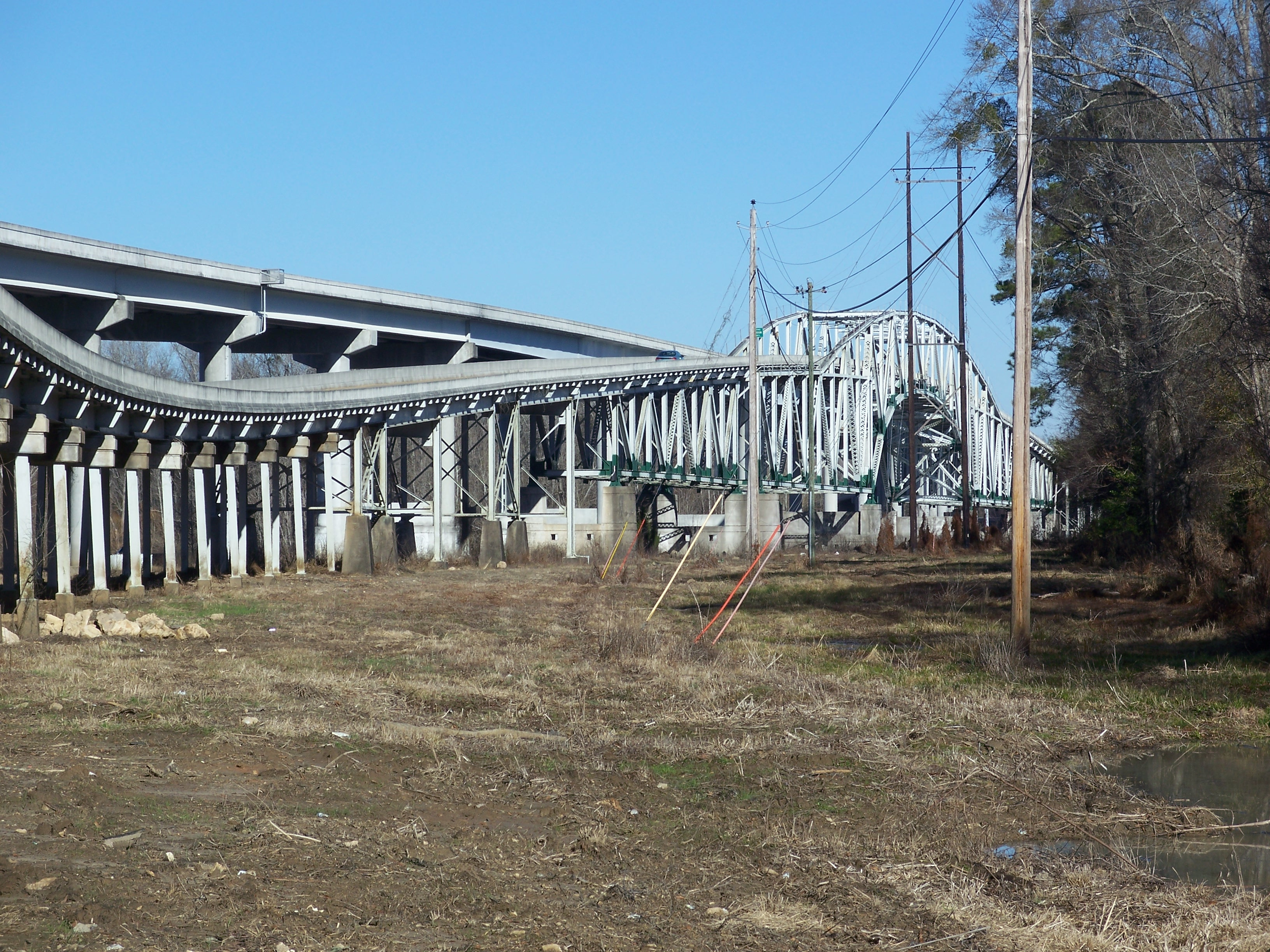
The Trammell Bridge owes its distinctive design to its mix of old and new elements.

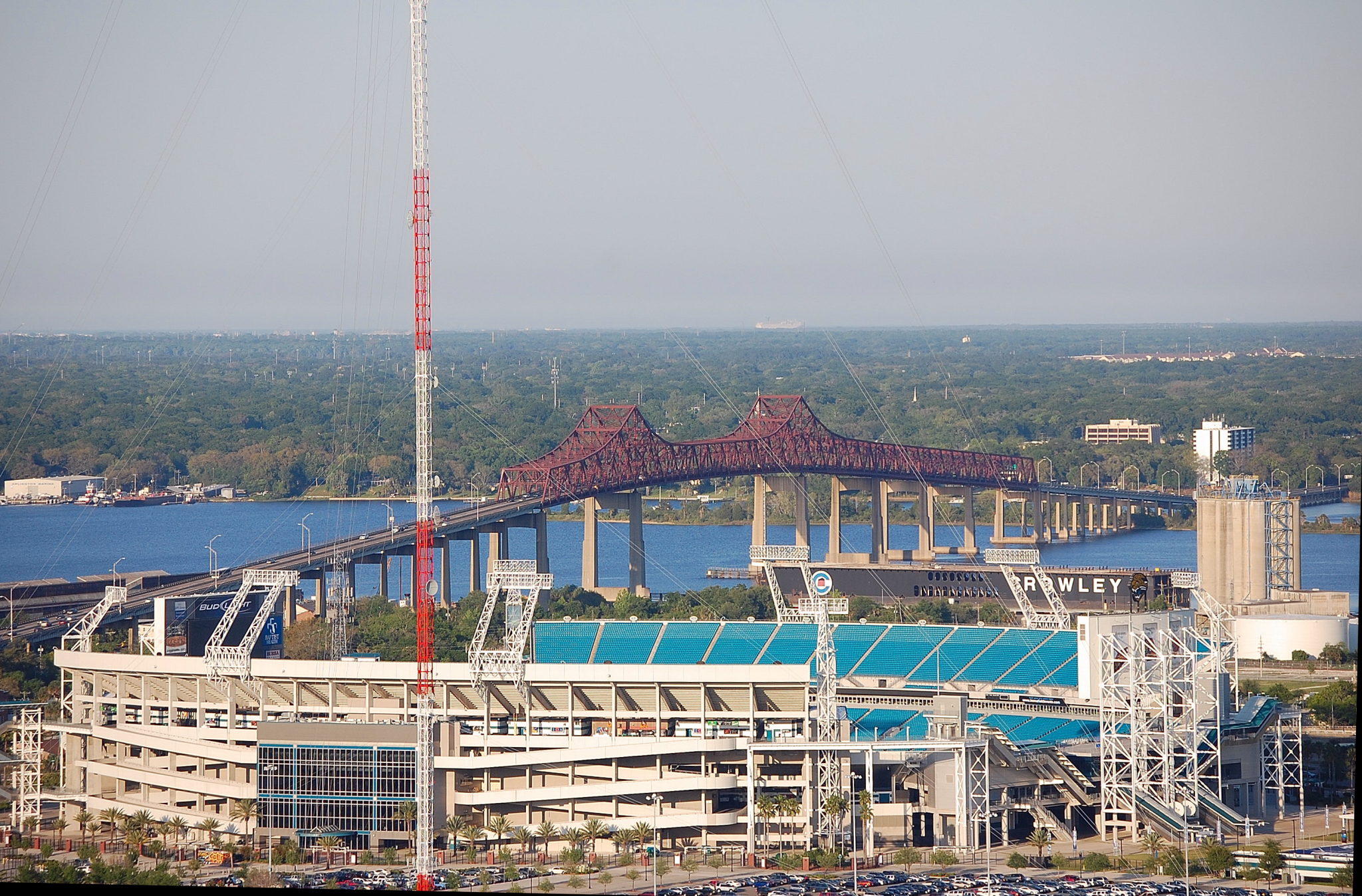
The Mathews Bridge crossing the St. Johns River, with TIAA Bank Field in the foreground

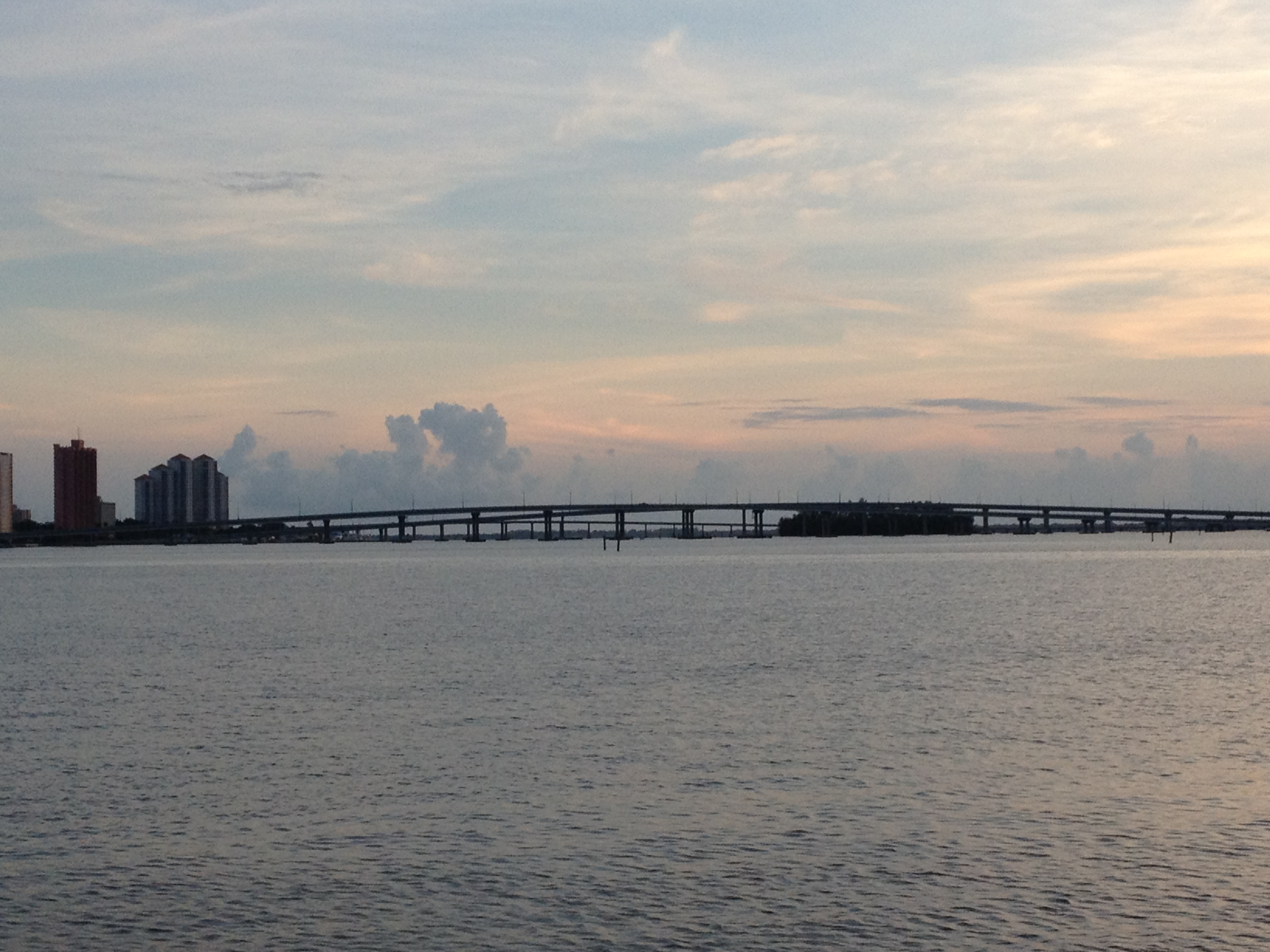
The Edison Bridge seen in the foreground, with the Caloosahatchee River Bridge in the background and downtown Fort Myers to the left

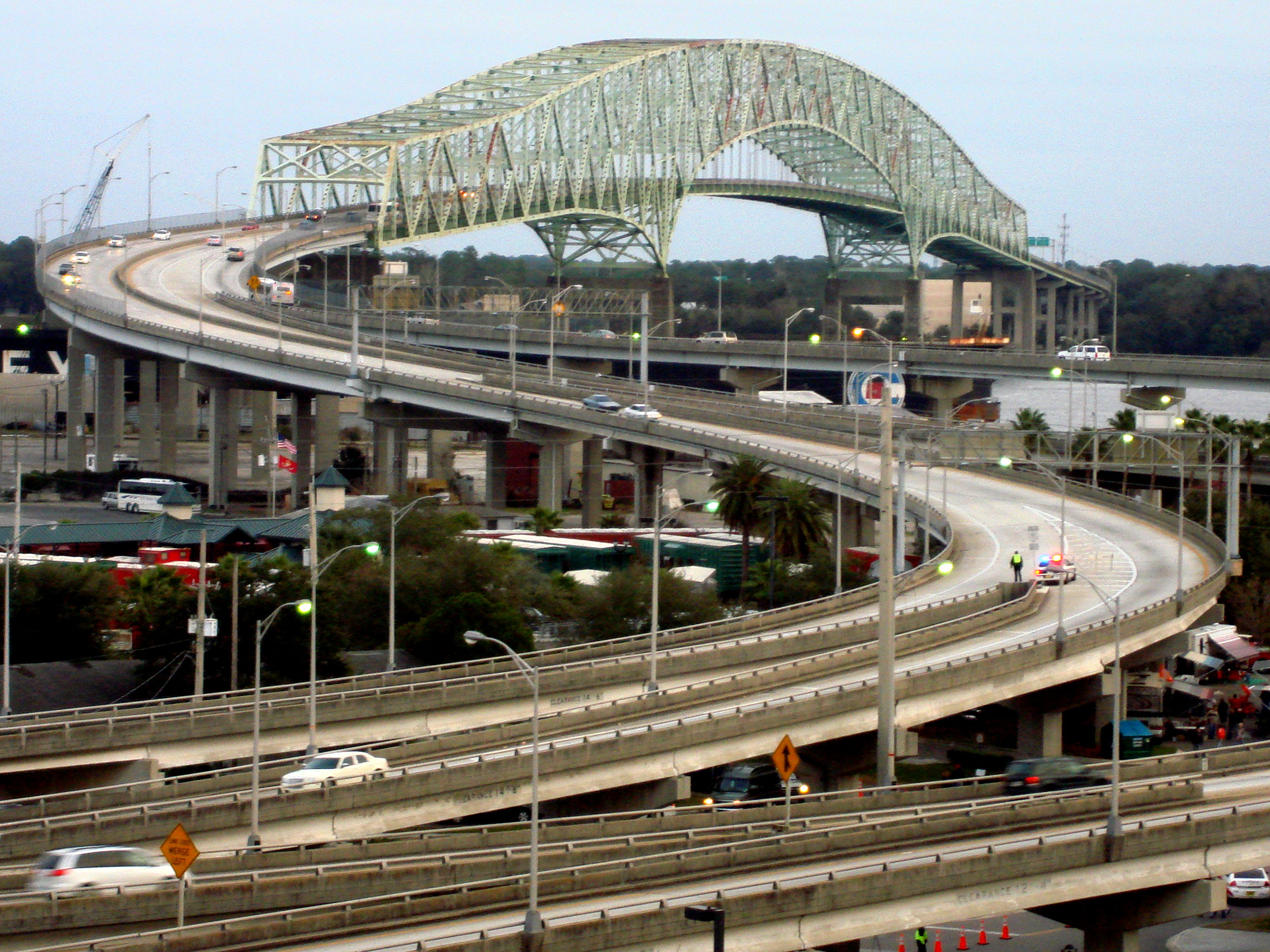
The Isaiah D. Hart Bridge, as seen from TIAA Bank Field

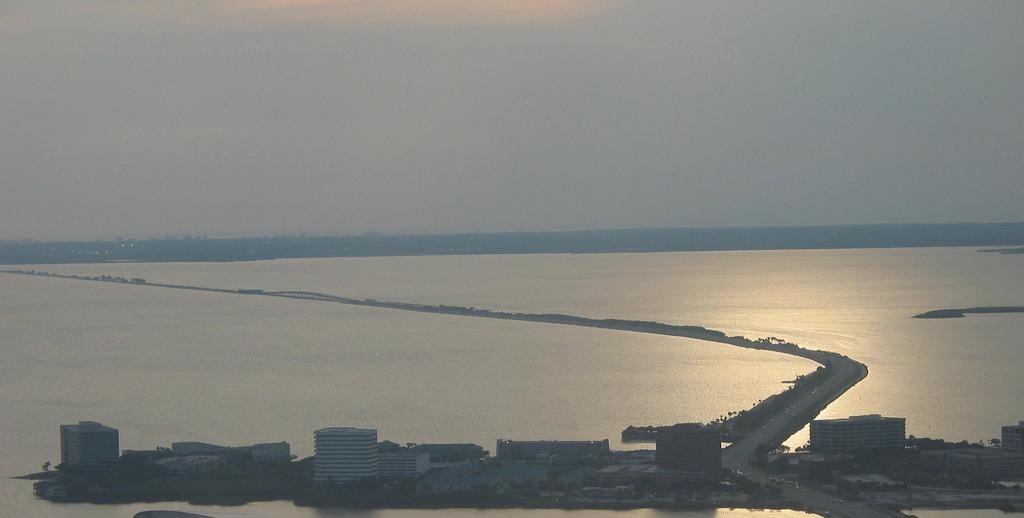
While the Courtney Campbell Causeway itself is almost 10 mi (16.1 km) long, its longest over-water span (center-left) is just over one half-mile (804.7m) long.

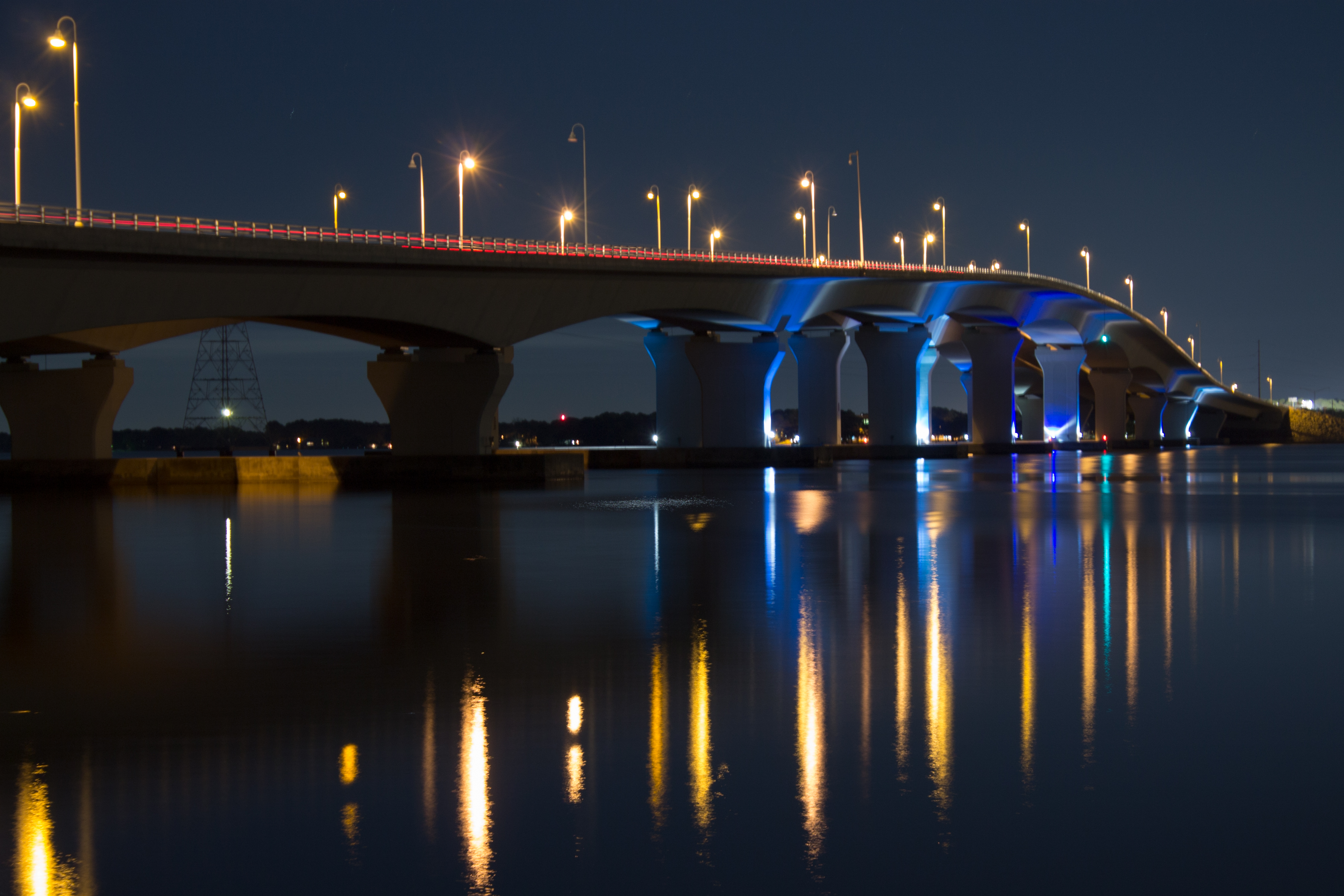
The Hathaway Bridge, as seen at night

== See also ==
- List of bridges on the National Register of Historic Places in Florida
- List of movable bridges in Florida
- List of crossings of the St. Johns River
- List of bridges in the United States
