= Dewey Johnson =

Dewey Johnson may refer to:

- Dewey Johnson (Minnesota politician) (1899-1941), American politician in Minnesota
- Dewey M. Johnson (1907-1986), American politician in Florida
- Dewey Johnson (musician) (1939-2018), American free jazz trumpeter
