= Dames Point Bridge =

Bridge in Jacksonville, Florida, United States

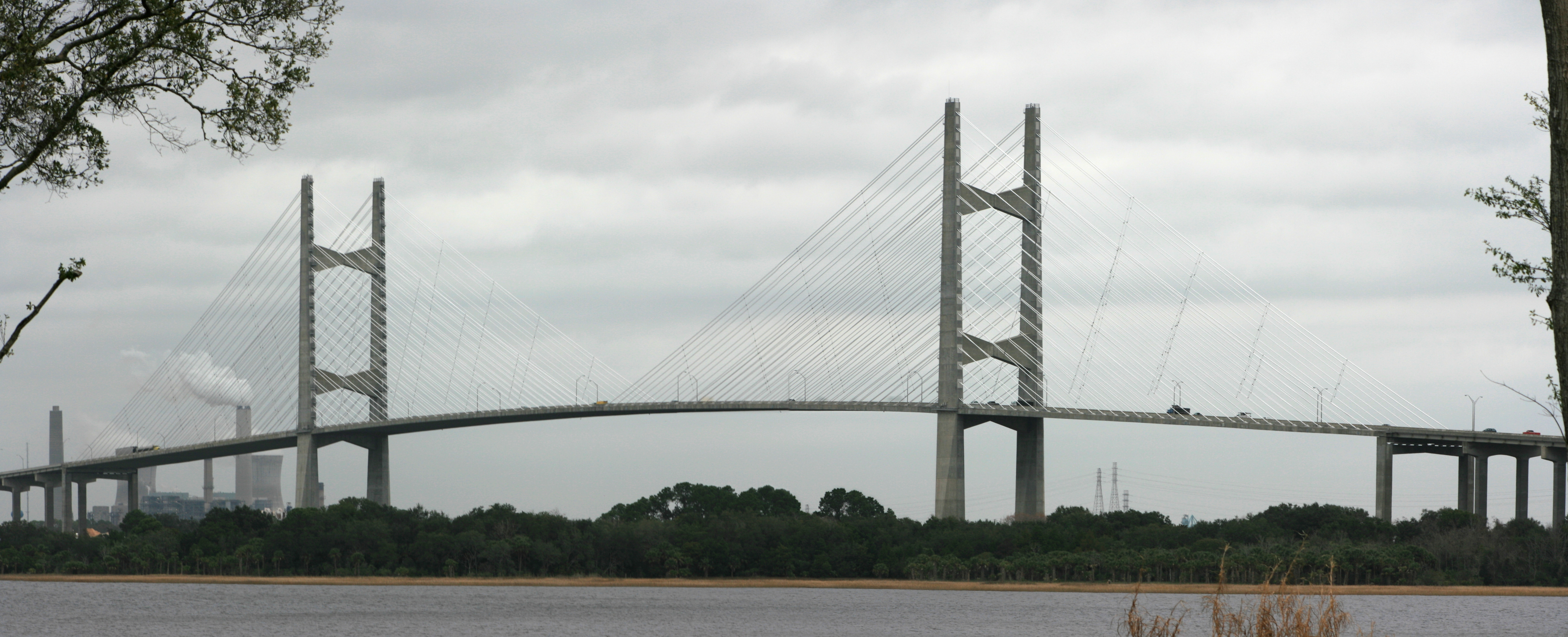
- Dames Point Bridge in 2010.
- Coordinates: 30.3858°N 81.5574°W
- Carries: I-295 (SR 9A / Jacksonville Eastern Beltway) (six general purpose lanes)
- Crosses: St. Johns River
- Locale: Jacksonville, Florida
- Official name: Napoleon Bonaparte Broward Bridge
- Maintained by: Florida Department of Transportation
- ID number: 720518

Characteristics
- Design: Continuous prestressed concrete cable-stayed bridge
- Total length: 10,646 feet (3244.9 m)
- Width: 106 feet (32.2 m)
- Height: 471 feet (143.5 m)
- Longest span: 1,300 feet (396.2 m)
- Clearance above: 39.7 feet (12.11 m)
- Clearance below: 175 feet (53.34 m)

History
- Construction start: 1985
- Opened: March 10, 1989; 37 years ago

Statistics
- Daily traffic: 77,000 (2019)

Location
- Interactive map of Dames Point Bridge

The Dames Point Bridge (officially the Napoleon Bonaparte Broward Bridge) is a cable-stayed bridge over the St. Johns River in Jacksonville, Florida, United States on the Interstate 295 East Beltway. Construction began in 1985 and was completed in 1989. The main span is 1,300 feet (396.2 m), and is 175 feet (53.3 m) high. The bridge was designed by HNTB Corporation and RS&H, Inc. The Massman Construction Company built the bridge.

== Design ==
The bridge's cables are arranged on multiple vertical planes in a slight modification to the harp (parallel) stay arrangement. Main span cables are paired to anchor into the tower in a vertical plane while side span cables pair up to anchor in a horizontal plane such that four cables anchor in each tower at approximately the same elevation.

== Superlatives ==
Until the 2003 completion of the Sidney Lanier Bridge in Brunswick, Georgia, the Dames Point Bridge was the only bridge in the United States to feature the harp stay arrangement.

It remains one of the largest cable-stayed bridges in the United States, with 21 miles (34 km) of cable.

== Gallery ==
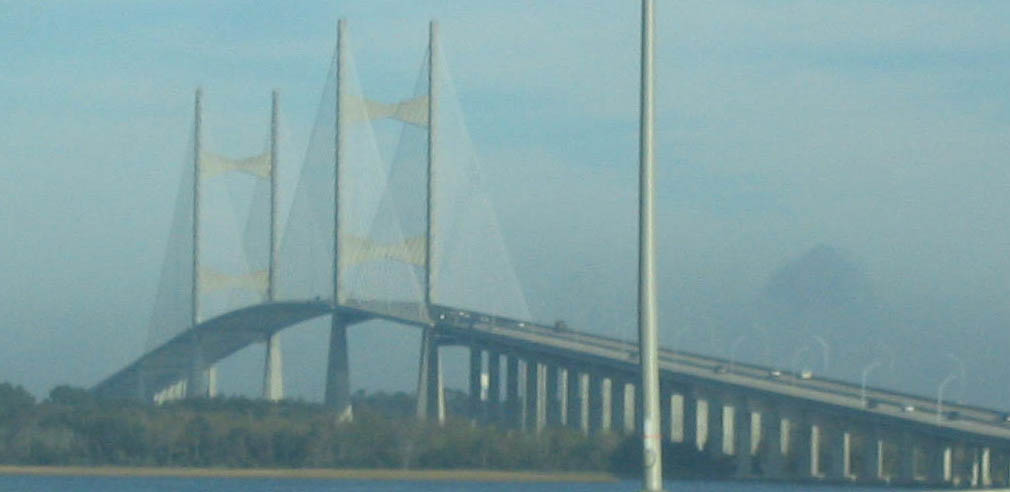
The Dames Point Bridge, seen from northbound I-295 in December 2005

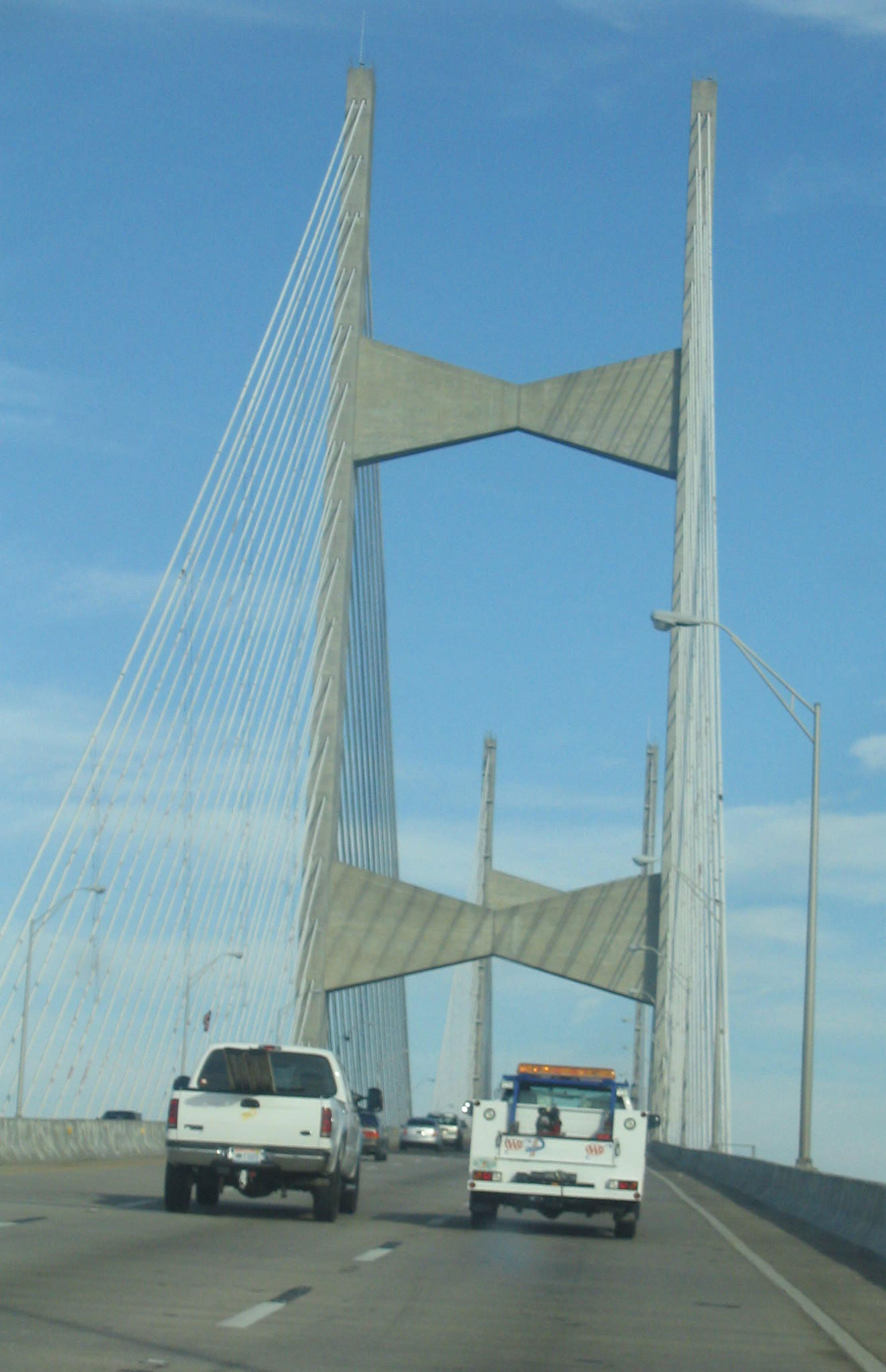
Northbound on the Dames Point Bridge in 2005.

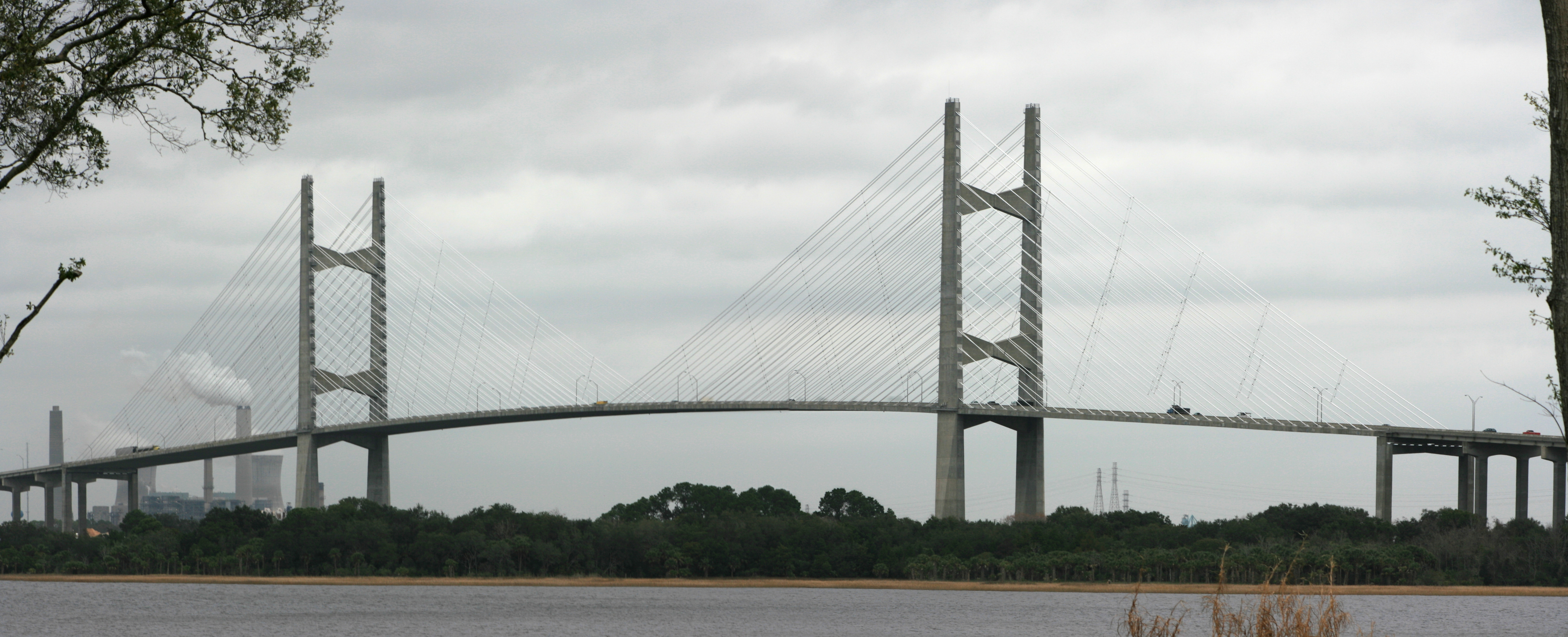
The Dames Point Bridge in 2010

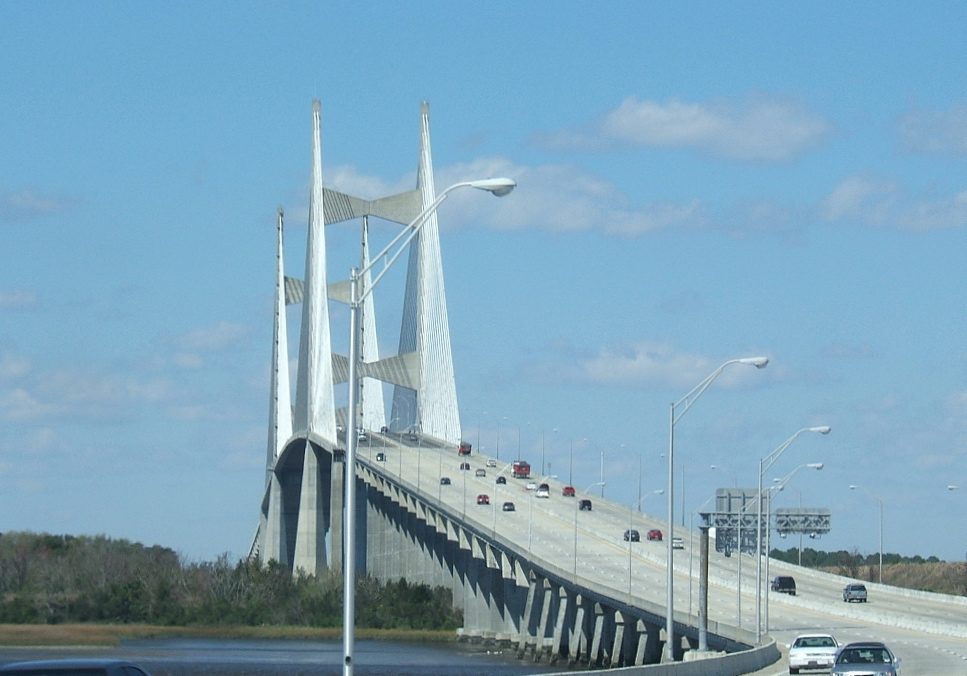
The Dames Point Bridge in 2005

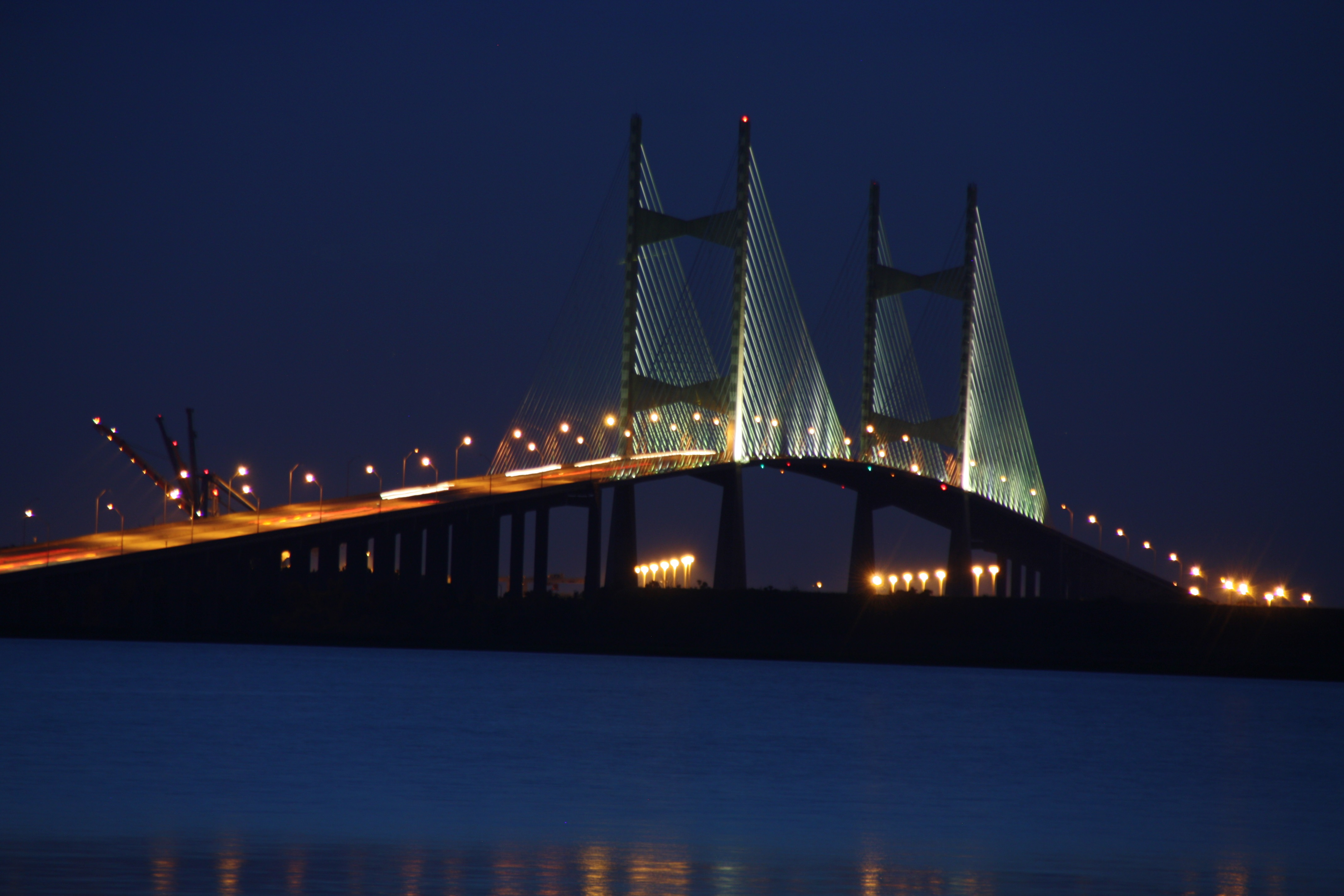
The Dames Point Bridge at Night - 2013

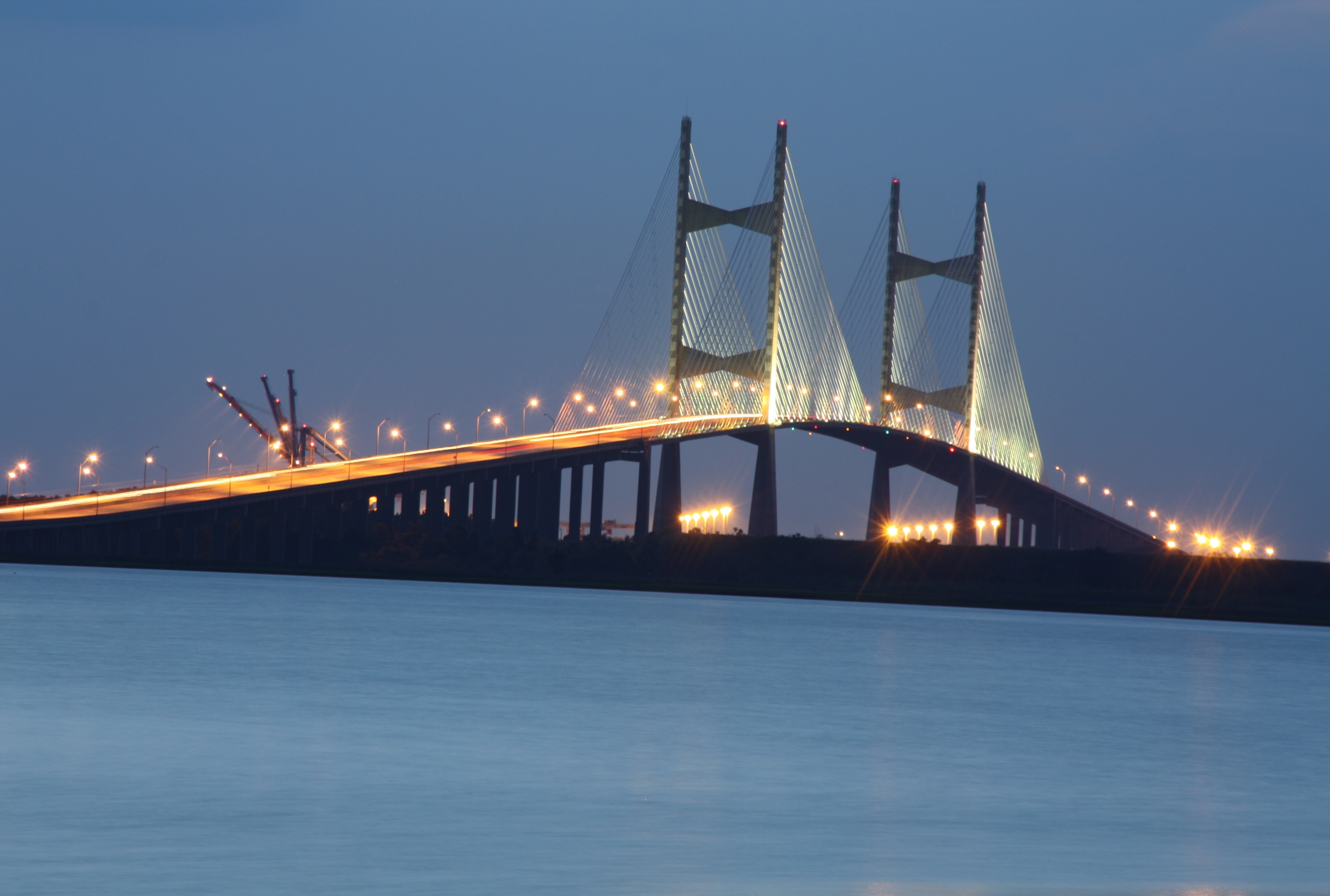
After Sunset 2013

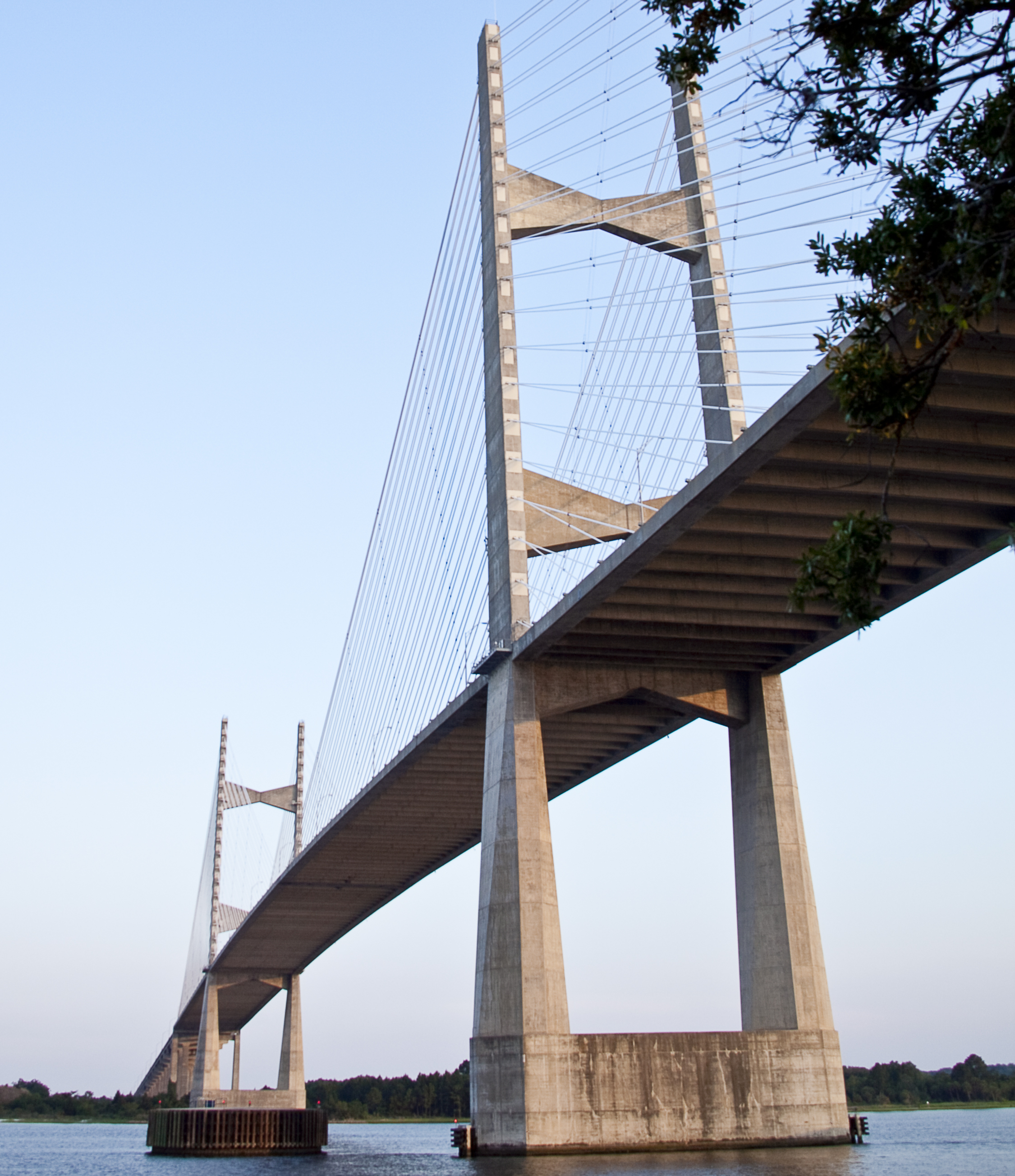
From the bottom in 2010

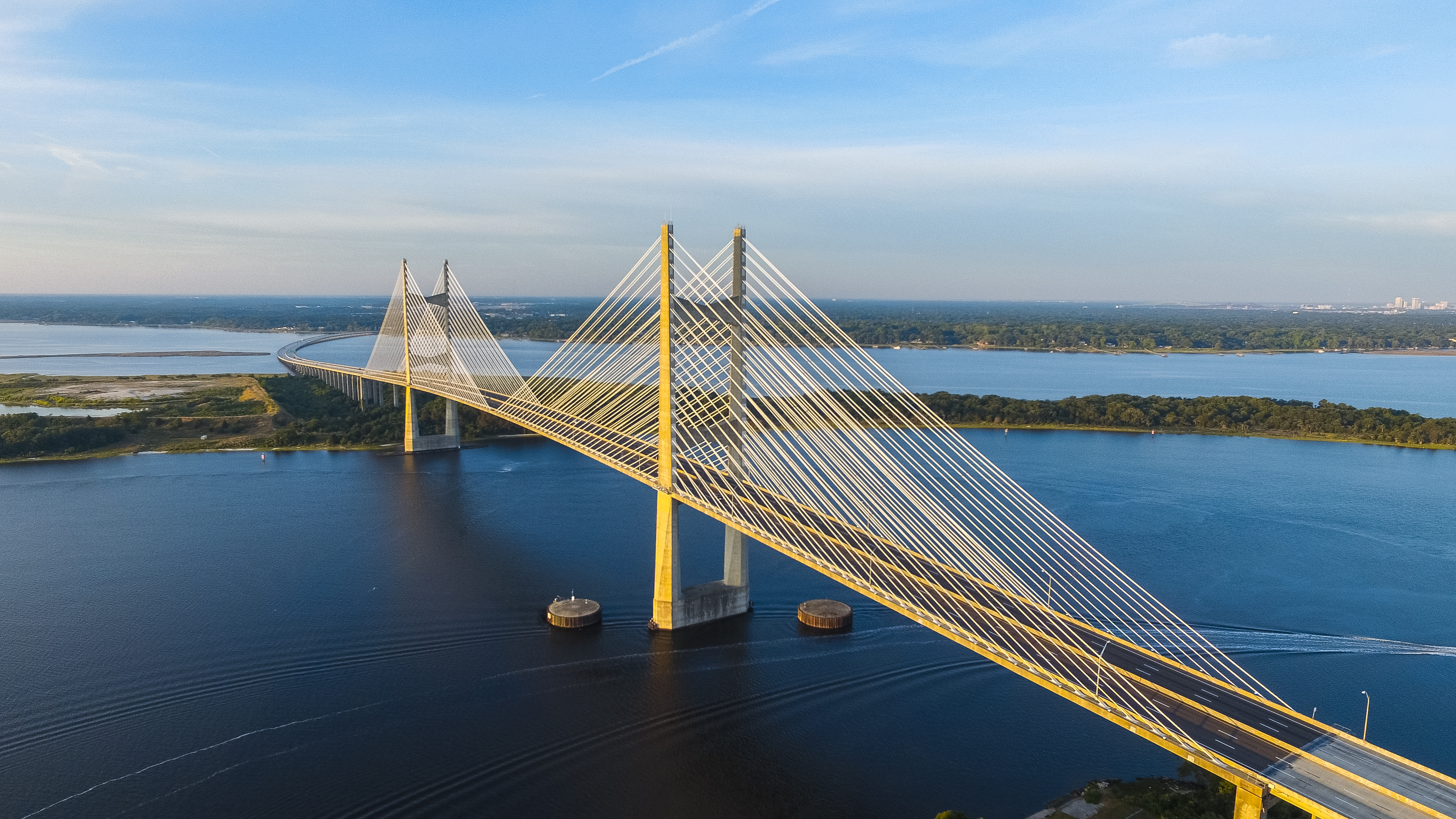
Its extent length in 2016

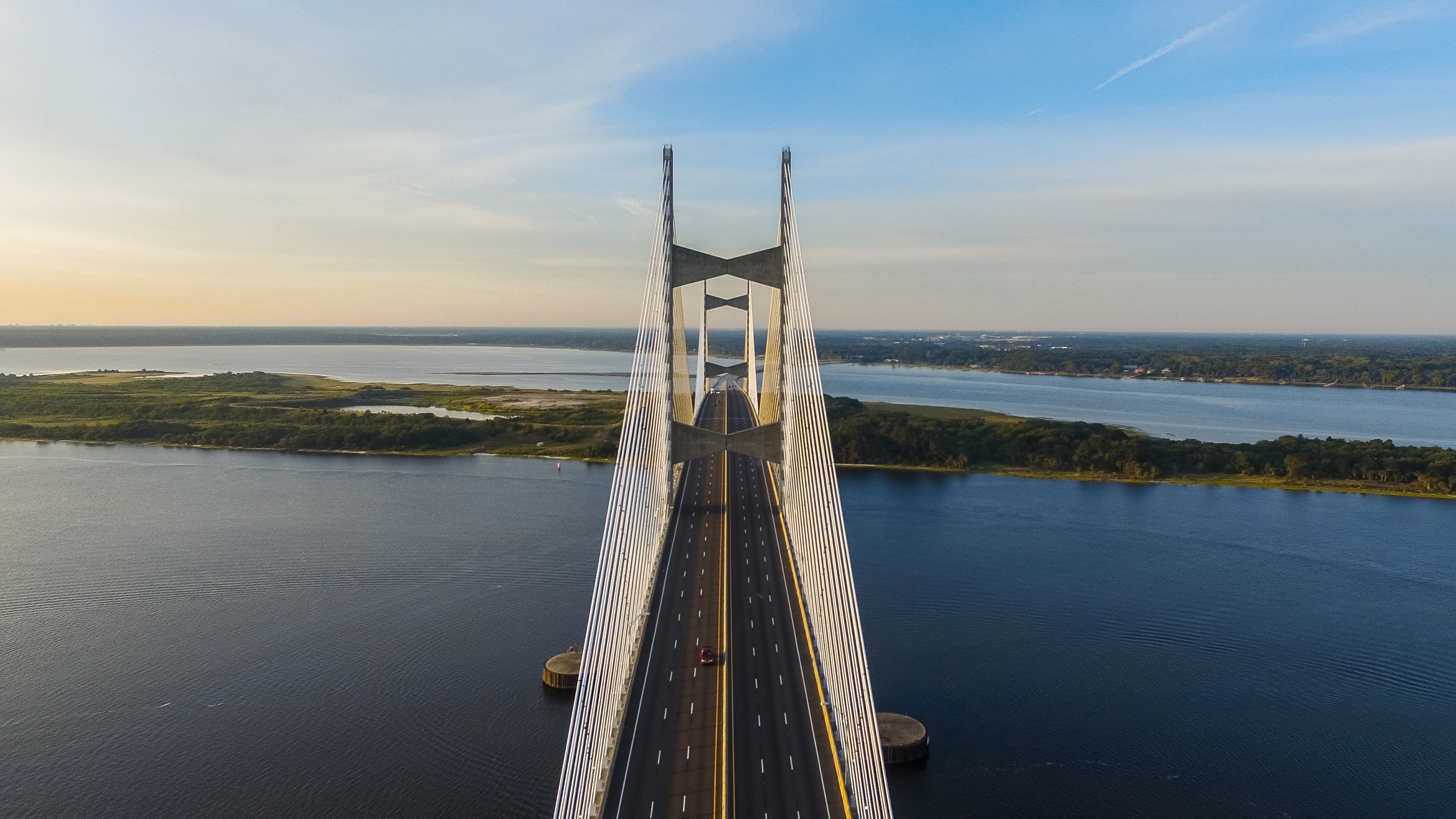
Road design on the bridge in 2016

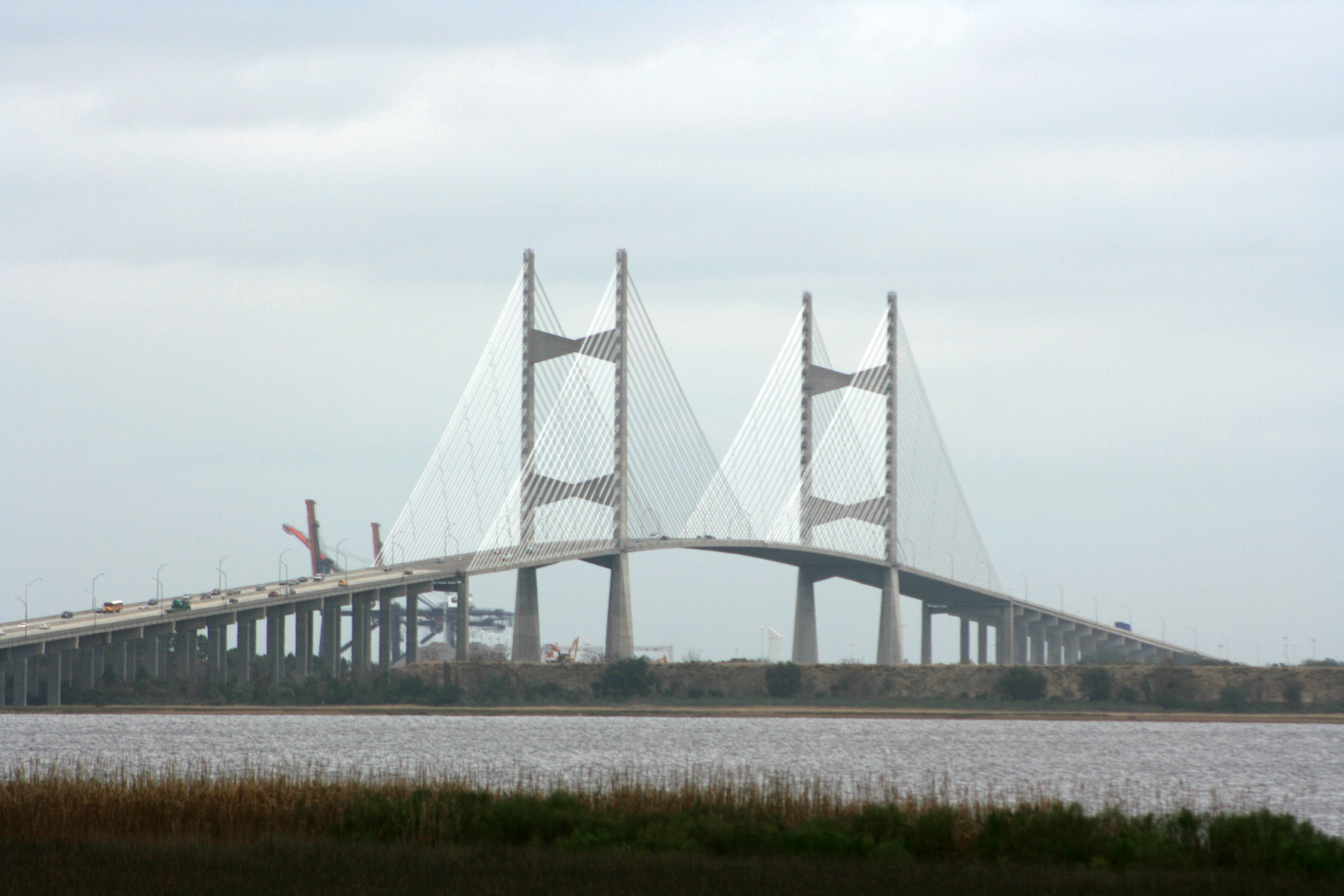
Another view of the bridge in 2010

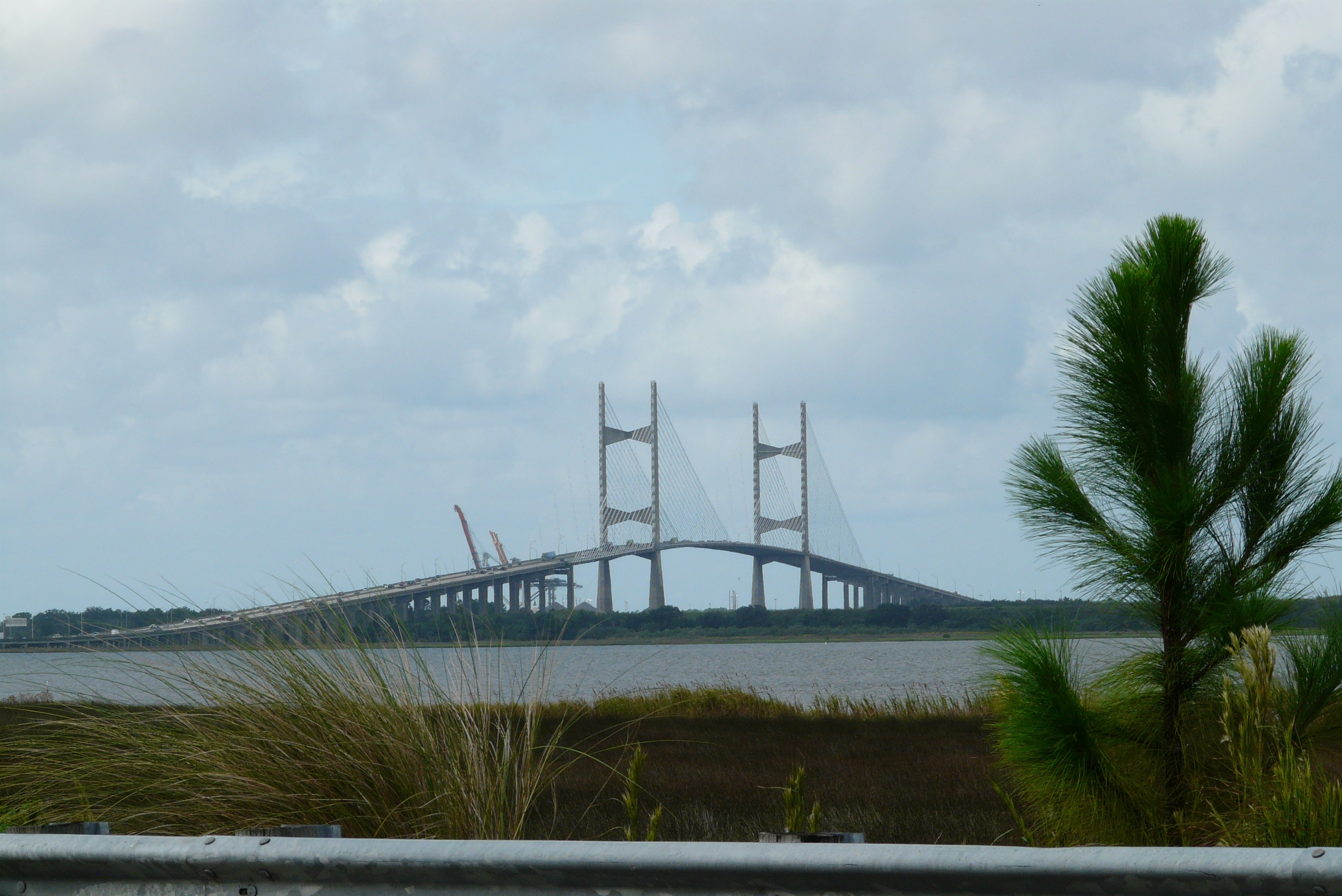
Same view in 2025

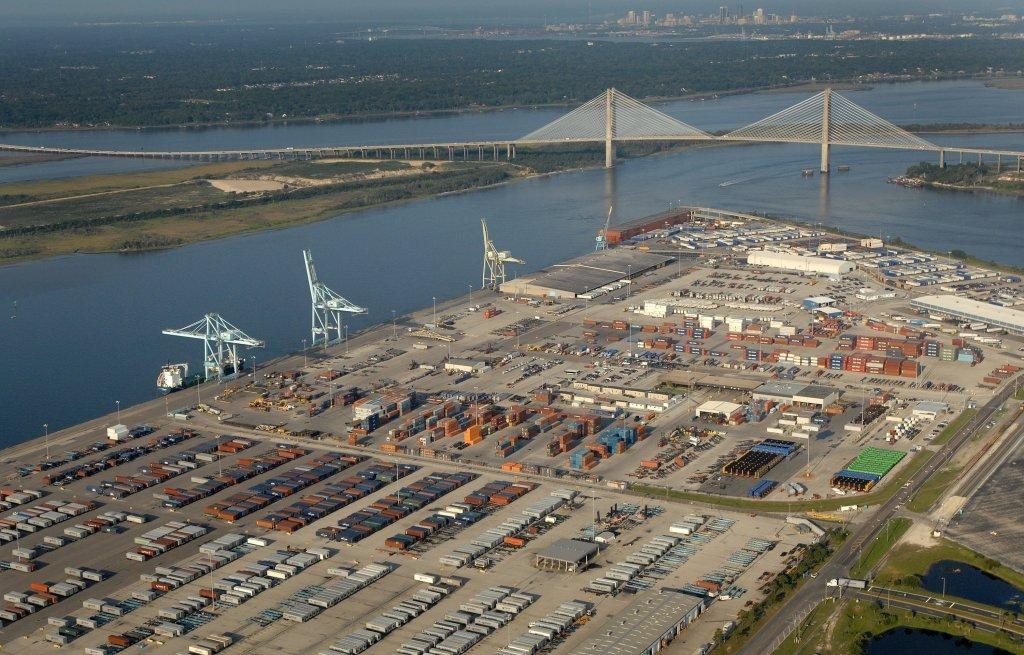
View of the bridge from the port terminal in 2012

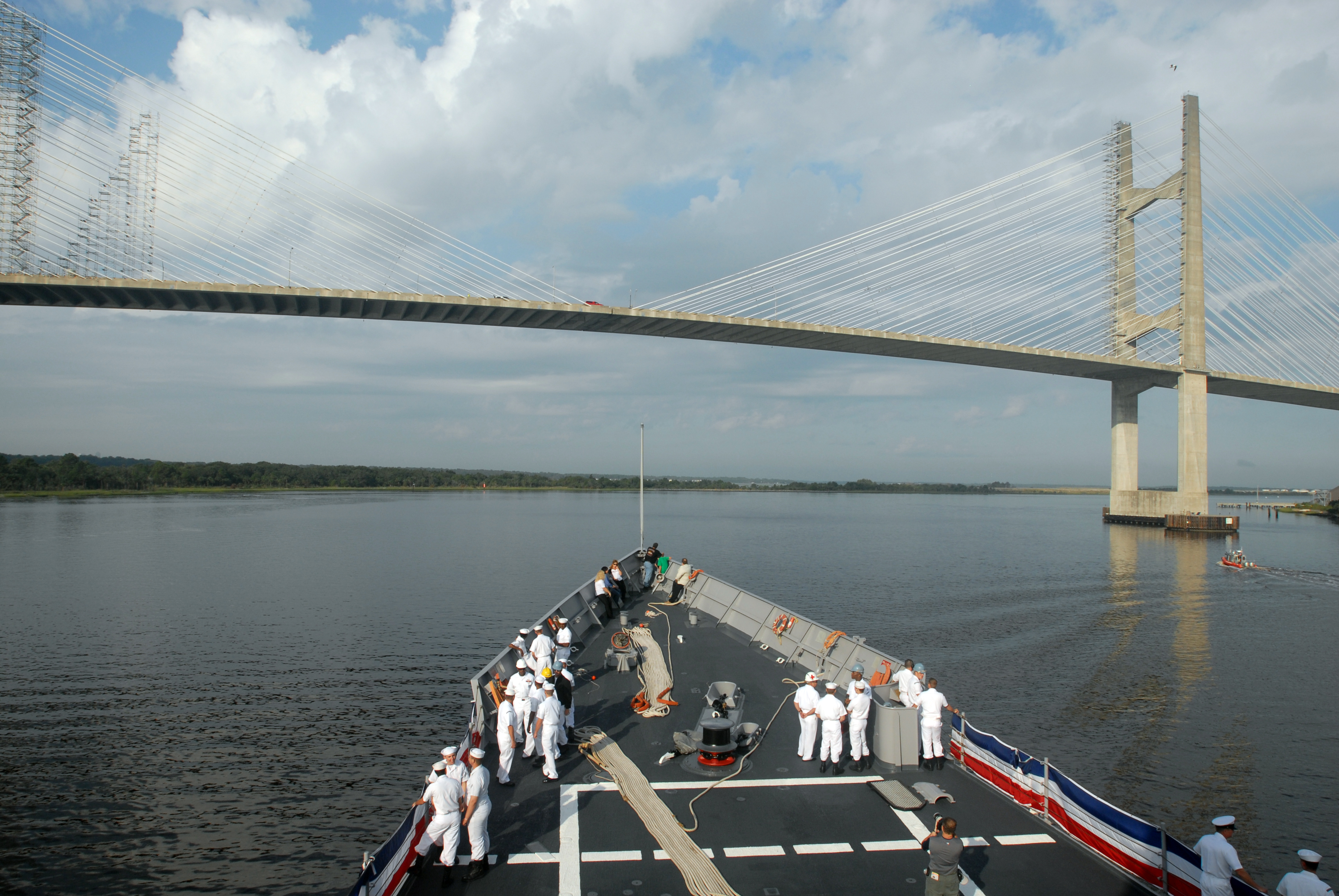
US Navy passing by the bridge in 2008

== Accident ==
On May 15, 1989, while inspectors were checking the bridge for cracks and fissures, the boom arm holding a bucket snapped, leaving the bucket tilted on its side. One worker fell into the river below and the others were at risk of plummeting 145 feet down. The man in the river suffered a dislocated shoulder but was able to swim to safety. Rescuers rappelled down the side of the bridge to the other three workers and successfully brought them all to safety. The story of this rescue effort was aired on Rescue 911 on September 12 of the same year.

== See also ==
- List of crossings of the St. Johns River
- List of bridges in Florida
- Sunshine Skyway Bridge
