= List of bridges on the National Register of Historic Places in Florida =

This is a list of bridges and tunnels on the National Register of Historic Places in the U.S. state of Florida.

Name	Image	Built	Listed	Location	County	Type
Blackburn Point Bridge	Blackburn Point Bridge	1925	March 29, 2001	Osprey; 27°10′46″N 82°29′41″W	Sarasota	Warren pony truss
Bridge of Lions		1926	November 19, 1982	St. Augustine; 29°53′33″N 81°18′27″W	St. Johns	Bascule
Lafayette Street Bridge (Kennedy Blvd. Drawbridge)		1913	February 20, 2018	Tampa; 27°56′48″N 82°27′40″W	Hillsborough	Bascule
Michigan Avenue Bridge (Columbus Drive Drawbridge)		1926	September 25, 2017	Tampa; 27°58′0.46″N 82°28′30.62″W	Hillsborough	Swing-Span
Moores Creek Bridge		1925	August 17, 2001	Fort Pierce; 27°27′2″N 80°19′32″W	St. Lucie	Deck arch
Overseas Highway and Railway Bridges		1905, 1912, 1935, ca. 1936	August 13, 1979	Florida Keys	Monroe	Arch, girder, & truss
Venetian Causeway		1926	July 13, 1989	Miami, Miami Beach; 25°47′24″N 80°10′52″W	Miami-Dade	Bascule
