= Hathaway Bridge =

Bridge in Florida, United States of America

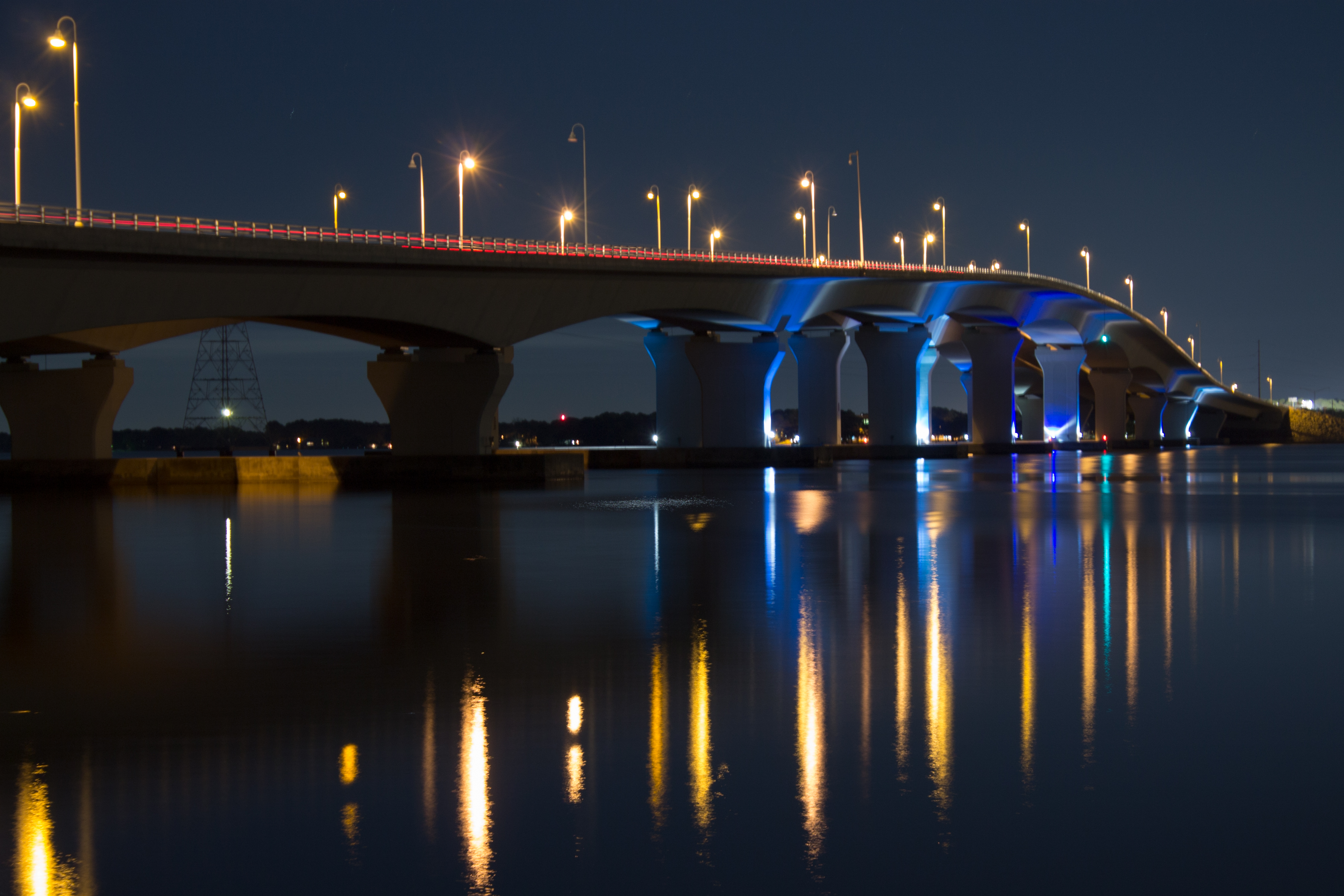
- Coordinates: 30.187°N 85.742°W
- Carries: US 98
- Locale: Panama City to Panama City Beach, Bay County, Florida

Characteristics
- Total length: .6 miles (0.97 km)

History
- Opened: 2003

Location
- Interactive map of Hathaway Bridge

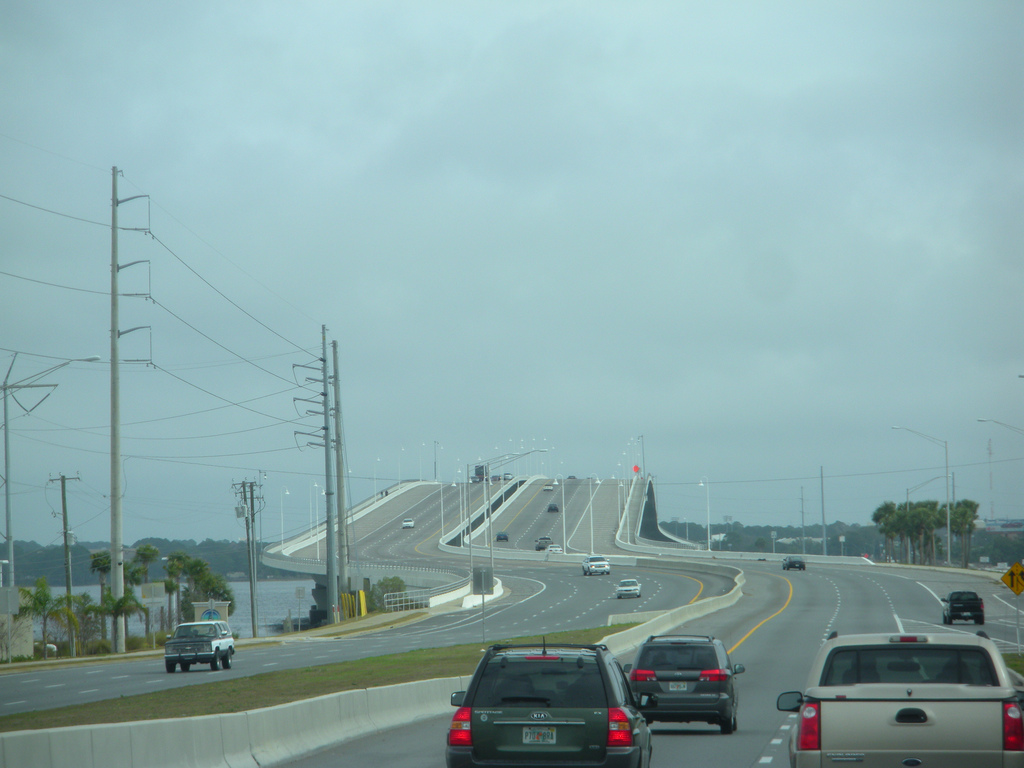
View approaching from Panama City Beach

The Hathaway Bridge along U.S. Route 98 (US 98) connects Panama City with Panama City Beach, Florida.

== History ==
=== Previous spans ===
The first St. Andrews Bay Bridge at the site was built in 1929 and renamed for Franz Hathaway, chairman of Florida's State Road Department. This bridge carried one lane of traffic in each direction with narrow shoulders. The second Hathaway bridge replaced Hathaway I and was completed in 1959. This bridge had two lanes of traffic in each direction with a narrow shoulder and no pedestrian access.

=== Current span ===
In 1997, the state of Florida allocated more than $80 million for the construction of a new Hathaway Bridge. Completed late in 2003, the current bridge replaced the former one that was unable to carry the increasingly high number of users. The present bridge carries four general purpose and two full breakdown lanes, as well as a pedestrian path in each direction. It was built just to the north of the 1959 bridge. For this reason, US-98 curves slightly northwards as it encounters the bay. Following completion of the new bridge, the former bridge was demolished. Portions of both Hathaway I and II are still submerged to the south of the present day Hathaway bridge.
