= Trammell Bridge =

Bridge in Florida, United States of America

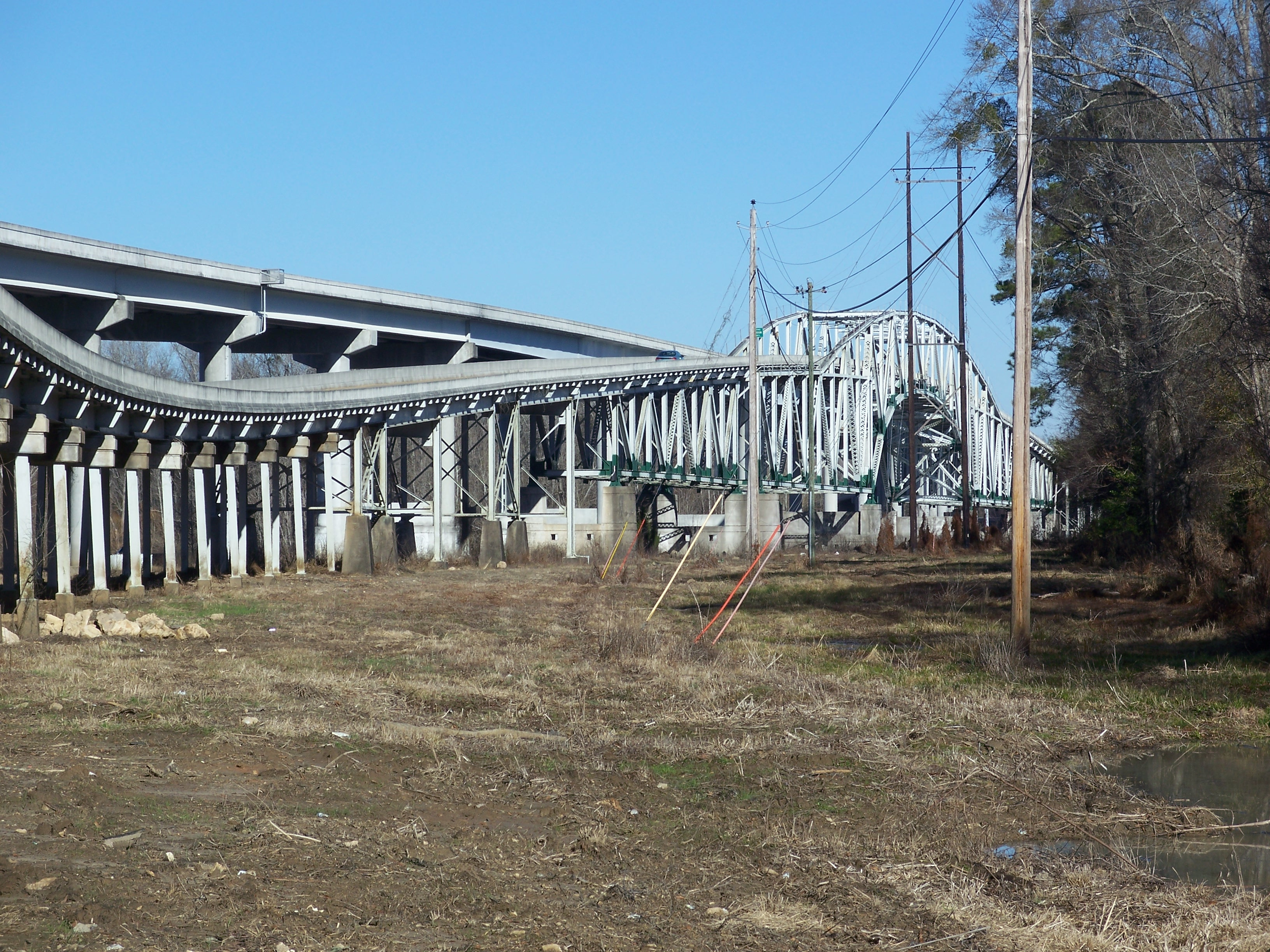
- Coordinates: 30°26′14″N 85°0′4″W
- Carries: 4 lanes of SR 20
- Crosses: Apalachicola River
- Locale: Blountstown to Bristol, Florida
- Maintained by: Florida Department of Transportation
- ID number: 470029; 470052; 470056

Characteristics
- Total length: 8,362 feet (2,549 m) (eastbound span)
- Width: 150 feet (46 m) channel (eastbound span)
- Clearance above: 55 feet (17 m) (eastbound span)

History
- Opened: 1938; 1998

Location
- Interactive map of Trammell Bridge

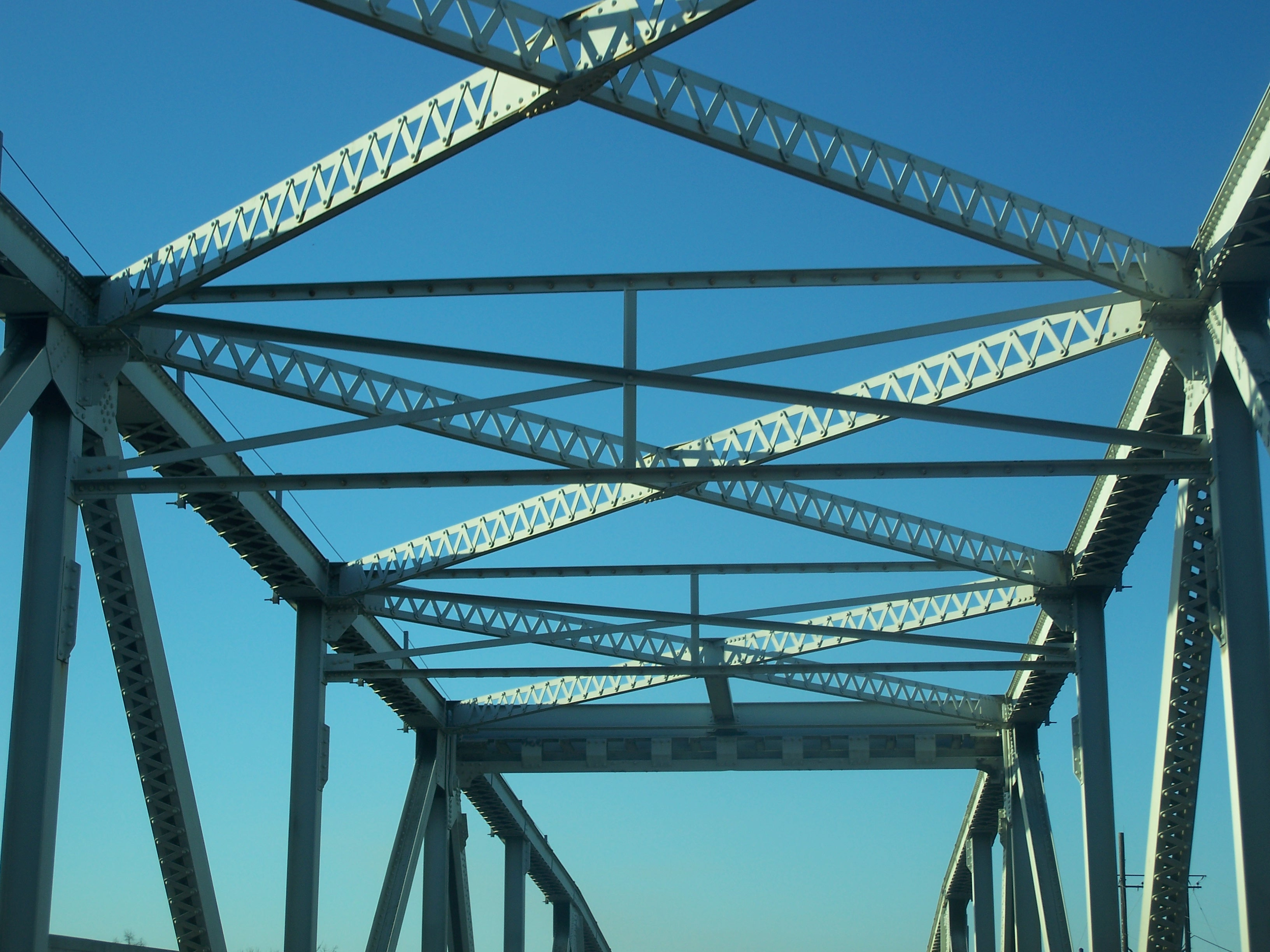
Original bridge

The Trammell Bridge is 1.6 miles (2.6 km) long and carries State Road 20 over the Apalachicola River in the Florida Panhandle between Blountstown and Bristol. It is named for three members of the Trammell family: (1) U.S. Senator from Florida and former governor Park M. Trammell, who died in office in 1936; (2) his brother, John D. Trammell, member of the Florida legislature representing Calhoun County (Blountstown) who introduced the bill to construct the original bridge; and (3) Robert D. Trammell, John Trammell's grandson who represented the area in the Florida legislature and secured funding for the new bridge.

The westbound and eastbound lanes of SR 20 are on separate spans. The westbound span is the original, older bridge (opened in 1938) and the eastbound span is a modern, concrete high-rise bridge (opened in 1998).

The original bridge (westbound) was built of steel and concrete piers by the Wisconsin Iron and Bridge Company. In 1989, the original span was listed in A Guide to Florida's Historic Architecture, published by the University of Florida Press.

The Eastern end of the bridge is in the Eastern Time zone, while the Western end is in the Central Time zone.

Starting in 2023, studies began for the removal of the old westbound span, and the conversion of the current eastbound span to carry two-way traffic.

== See also ==
- List of bridges documented by the Historic American Engineering Record in Florida
