= Dewey M. Johnson =

American politician

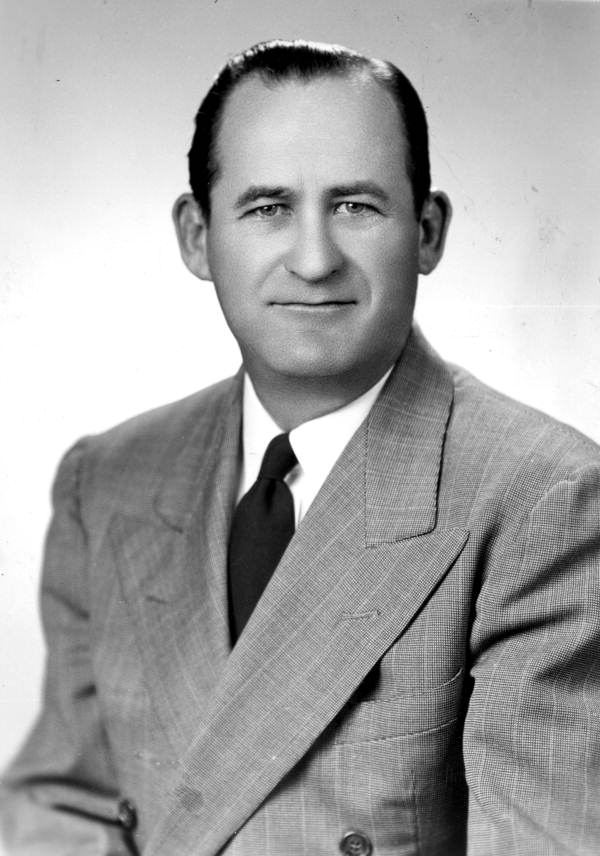

Member of the Florida Senate
- In office 1951–1967 (6th district)
- In office 1941–1943 (9th district)

Personal details
- Born: August 6, 1907 Quincy, Florida, U.S.
- Died: December 12, 1986 (aged 79) Gadsden County, Florida, U.S.
- Party: Democrat
- Spouse: Margie Kimbrough
- Occupation: Lawyer

Dewey Macon "Nick" Johnson (April 6, 1907 – December 12, 1986) was an American politician in the state of Florida and a Democrat.

Johnson was born in Quincy, Florida in 1907 and attended schooling there. He later attended the University of Florida where he earned a law degree. He served in the Florida State Senate from 1941 to 1943 (9th district) and from 1951 to 1967 (6th district). In the 1959 session, he served as President of the Senate. Johnson also served in the Florida House of Representatives, having been elected in 1939, 1945, 1947 and 1949. He was a member of the Pork Chop Gang, a group of legislators from rural areas that dominated the state legislature due to malapportionment and used their power to engage in McCarthyist tactics.
