= John F. Chase =

United States Army Medal of Honor recipient (1843–1914)

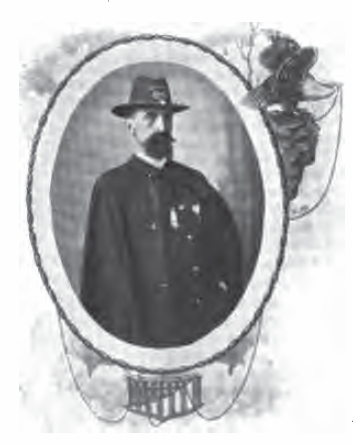
- Born: April 23, 1843; Chelsea, Maine, US
- Died: November 28, 1914 (aged 71); St. Petersburg, Florida Pinellas County age 71 USA
- Military career
- Allegiance: United States; Union
- Branch: US Army; Union Army
- Rank: Private
- Unit: 5th Battery, Maine Volunteer Light Artillery
- Conflicts: American Civil War • Battle of Chancellorsville • Battle of Gettysburg
- Awards: Medal of Honor

John F. Chase (1843–1914) was a Union Army soldier in the American Civil War and a recipient of the United States military's highest decoration, the Medal of Honor. An artilleryman, Chase earned the medal by continuing to work his cannon despite intense Confederate fire at the Battle of Chancellorsville. He later participated in the Battle of Gettysburg and was severely wounded, losing his right arm, by a Confederate artillery shell. After the war, Chase worked as an inventor before moving to the St. Petersburg, Florida, area. In Florida, he was involved in various business pursuits, including an attempt to form a retirement community for former soldiers in Veteran City, today known as Gulfport.

== Early life ==
Chase was born in Chelsea, Maine to Oliver and Rachel Chase. In June 1861 he joined Company B of the 3rd Maine Infantry. In November of that year he transferred to the 5th Maine Artillery.

== Battle of Chancellorsville ==
Chase joined the Army from Augusta, Maine, and by May 3, 1863, was serving as a private in the 5th Battery, Maine Light Artillery. On that day, during the Battle of Chancellorsville, his unit was ordered to move forward through heavy fire, set up their six cannons, and commence firing on the Confederate forces. Confederate artillery had been established on a ridge 600 feet (180 m) away, and the guns poured heavy fire onto the 5th Maine's designated position. Within thirty minutes of setting up their own cannons, half of the men in Chase's battery were dead. Soon, all of the battery's officers had been killed or wounded and Chase's cannon was one of only two that were still operational. Lieutenant Edmund Kirby from the 1st U.S. Battery arrived to take command of the 5th Maine. Immediately after reaching Chase's gun, a Confederate shell exploded nearby and struck Kirby in the hip, leaving him incapacitated. As he lay beside the cannon, Chase asked if he wanted to be taken from the field, and Kirby replied, "No, not as long as a gun can be fired."

Eventually, Chase and another man, Corporal James Lebroke, were the only members of the battery still standing. Together, they continued to fire their cannon, with Chase sponging and ramming the muzzle, despite sustained fire from the Confederate artillery and approaching infantry. The gun was finally disabled when it was hit directly in the muzzle by a Confederate shell; the damage prevented Chase and Lebroke from reloading the weapon. Chase again asked Lieutenant Kirby if he wanted to be carried from the field, and Kirby replied, "No, not until the guns are taken off."

Stationed next to the 5th Maine Battery during the battle was the 116th Pennsylvania Infantry of the Irish Brigade. Seeing that their position was about to be overrun, Second Lieutenant Louis J. Sacriste, in command of the 116th Pennsylvania's Company D, led his men through the smoke and enemy fire to reach the 5th Maine. While Chase and Lebroke lifted the rear of their cannon, Sacriste and his company attached ropes to the front and pulled the gun from the field. The rest of the 116th Pennsylvania and then the whole Irish Brigade joined in, pulling all of the cannons and caissons to safety.

Satisfied that the cannons were out of the Confederates' reach, Chase returned to the field, picked up Lieutenant Kirby, and carried him to the rear. Before Chase left, Kirby took down his and Lebroke's names and stated "If ever two men have earned a Medal of Honor, you have, and you shall have it." Kirby died of his wounds three weeks later.

For these actions, Chase was awarded the Medal of Honor several decades later, on February 7, 1888. Louis Sacriste was also awarded the medal, in part for his actions in saving the 5th Maine Battery's cannons.

Chase's official Medal of Honor citation reads:

Nearly all the officers and men of the battery having been killed or wounded, this soldier with a comrade continued to fire his gun after the guns had ceased. The piece was then dragged off by the two, the horses having been shot, and its capture by the enemy was prevented.

== Battle of Gettysburg ==
Two months after earning the Medal of Honor at Chancellorsville, Chase participated in the Battle of Gettysburg. The 5th Maine Battery was a part of General John F. Reynolds' I Corps and fought at Seminary Hill on the first day of the battle, July 1, 1863. As the Confederates advanced, the corps fell back past the town of Gettysburg, with Chase's battery taking up a position on a knoll between Culp's Hill and Cemetery Hill. On the battle's second day, July 2, the Confederates launched an assault on Cemetery Hill. Chase's battery fired with devastating effect on the attacking infantry, and in response, three or four Confederate batteries began targeting the 5th Maine's position.

A Confederate shell exploded near where Chase was standing. The blast took off his right arm, destroyed his left eye, and sent forty-eight pieces of shrapnel into his body. He was carried, unconscious, to the rear and left for dead. Two days later, his body was loaded onto a wagon along with many others to be buried. The wagon driver heard him moan, pulled him out from among the dead bodies, and gave him a drink of water. The first words Chase said were "Did we win the battle?".

Chase was taken to an Army hospital set up on a farm outside of Gettysburg and lain down beside a barn. The doctors there ignored him, thinking that he would die any minute, while they tended to other patients. After three days of lying on the ground, his wounds were bandaged and he was eventually moved into the farmhouse, where he stayed for a week. Sent to Seminary Hospital, his condition was still grim and about three weeks after arriving, he was again set outside to die. Despite the doctor's predictions, Chase survived his wounds. Following three months at Seminary Hospital, he was taken to West Philadelphia Hospital, where he stayed until he was well enough to return home to Augusta.

== Post-war life ==
After the war, he returned to Maine and worked as an inventor, receiving dozens of patents for his work. His most well-known invention was a collapsible hoop skirt and bustle combination. He married Maria Merrill and had seven children: George Edgar, Lena M, Beulah C, Frank, Maude Elizabeth, Ralph, and Bernette.

In 1895 he moved to St. Petersburg, Florida, where he engaged in a series of business ventures. These included working as a food peddler, owning a steamboat, and trying unsuccessfully to gain permission to build a power station and streetcar. His interest in the electric power industry brought him into contact with F. A. Davis, and he was involved in Davis' Florida West Coast Company. Using funding provided by Davis, Chase promoted the growth of Veteran City, today known as Gulfport, on St. Petersburg's southwest side. He encouraged the sale of land in the area and used his connections with veterans' organizations to arrange buyers from among former soldiers.

His Medal of Honor was passed down through his family until reaching great-grandson Steve Chase. On May 3, 2009, the 146th anniversary of the day John Chase earned the medal, his great-grandson donated it to Fredericksburg and Spotsylvania National Military Park during a ceremony at the park's Chancellorsville Visitor Center.

== See also ==
- List of Medal of Honor recipients
- List of American Civil War Medal of Honor recipients
