= Greenlief T. Stevens =

American lawyer

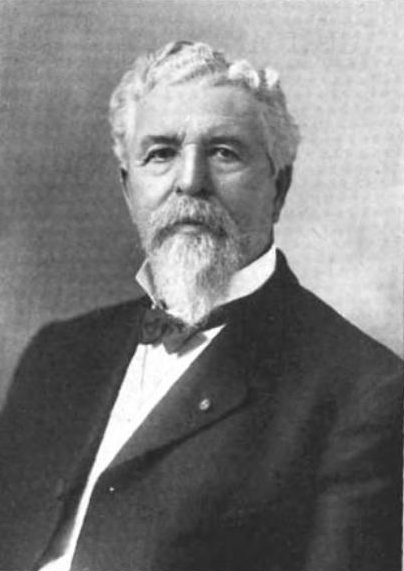
- Born: Greenlief Thurlow Stevens; August 20, 1831; Belgrade, Maine
- Died: December 22, 1918 (aged 87); Augusta, Maine
- Education: Harvard Law School
- Occupations: Banker, stockbroker, writer
- Spouse: Mary Ann Yeaton (m. 1856; died 1904)

Greenlief Thurlow Stevens (1831–1918) commanded the 5th Maine Battery in the American Civil War. His battery is commemorated by a monument on Stevens' Knoll, named for him, on the Gettysburg Battlefield. It was among the first parts of the battlefield purchased for preservation.

== Early life ==
Greenlief T. Stevens was born in Belgrade, Maine, a town in Kennebec County, on August 20, 1831. He was the youngest son of Daniel and Mahala (Smith) Stevens. Greenlief Stevens was educated in local schools and taught school before reading law with the Honorable Samuel Titcomb of Augusta, Maine. Stevens became a lawyer, practicing in Belgrade and Augusta after being admitted to the local bar in 1860, and also attended Harvard Law School, graduating in July 1861.

== Civil War service ==
Stevens was commissioned a lieutenant in the 5th Maine Battery on January 31, 1862. The battery spent early 1862 drilling before going into the field. Cpt George F. Leppien commanded the battery. It was attached to the division of BG James B. Ricketts in I Corps, when it was III Corps of the Army of Virginia. The 5th Maine participated in the Second Battle of Bull Run, one of its guns helping cover the army's retreat. When the division was assigned to BG John Gibbon, it served on the left flank at the Battle of Fredericksburg.

In the Battle of Chancellorsville, the 5th Maine, attached to the second division under BG John C. Robinson, was moving to join I Corps when it was ordered to a post near the Chancellor House supporting II Corps where it was under fire from Confederate guns. The battery was credited with helping 1st division II Corps withdraw from a dangerous position. Cpt Leppien was mortally wounded, and Lt Edmund Kirby was too. Lt Stevens took over command. He was wounded by a shell fragment on May 3, 1862; but he retained command of the battery. The battery lost a quarter of its personnel killed or wounded. (Stevens reported for the battery on May 8, 1863.)

Stevens succeeded to command of the 5th Maine Battery after Chancellorsville, being promoted to the rank of captain on June 21. The battery was transferred to the newly created artillery brigade of I Corps at the end of May. Stevens led the battery at the Battle of Gettysburg, serving near the Gettysburg Lutheran Seminary on July 1. It served near the left of the Seminary building, and it then moved to its right to cover the Chambersburg Pike. The Confederate brigade of BG Alfred Moore Scales came close to Stevens' guns before being repulsed. BG James S. Wadsworth ordered the battery to withdraw as the Union line on Seminary Ridge began to collapse from its left flank rightward. Col Charles S. Wainwright the I Corps chief of artillery countermanded the order and then reinstated it. The battery withdrew through the town of Gettysburg to Cemetery Hill under the cover of heavy smoke from their own gunfire.

The 5th Maine Battery was positioned by MG Winfield Scott Hancock on the knoll between Culp's Hill and East Cemetery Hill known as McKnight's Hill and now named for Stevens. Col Wainwright ordered Stevens to remove fence rails behind his position in case the battery had to retreat. It remained there on July 2 and 3, covering the north approach to Culp's Hill. Cpt Stevens was wounded in the legs by a Confederate sharpshooter on July 2, and Lt Edward N. Whittier commanded for the remainder of the battle. Under his direction, the battery exchanged fire with Confederate guns on Benner's Hill, part of a barrage that effectively suppressed the Confederate gunner's fire. The 5th Maine Battery received little fire in return, as the Confederates fired at East Cemetery Hill. Both Stevens and Whittier used a French "ordnance glass" as a range finder to improve the performance of their guns.

When two brigades from the division of MG Jubal Early attacked East Cemetery Hill late on July 2, the battery fired into the advancing Confederate formation. Uneven terrain and gathering darkness probably limited the effectiveness of the battery's fire. However, the brigade of Col Isaac E. Avery lacked sufficient punch in all of its attack, partly because of this fire, which hit the left flank of the Confederate advance. (The guns fired over the heads of the 33rd Massachusetts Infantry, startling these troops.) Apart from Capt Stevens, one lieutenant and 11 men were wounded. Another 6 were lost to the enemy during the retreat on the first day of the battle.

Stevens returned to command in time for the Bristoe Campaign and the Battle of Mine Run, remaining in the artillery brigade of I Corps. When the Army of the Potomac was reorganized before the Overland Campaign of 1864, the 5th Maine Battery was assigned to the Reserve Artillery. In that formation it took part in the Battle of the Wilderness, although little engaged. The battery was assigned to the artillery brigade of VI Corps under MG Horatio G. Wright on May 17, during the Battle of Spotsylvania Court House. The battery supported infantry of VI Corps during the Battle of North Anna as well. At the Battle of Cold Harbor, Stevens was able to place his guns in earthworks near the Gaines Mill Road to support the VI Corps line. On June 3, Stevens had his gunners fire canister at the Confederate works to support Wright's attack. Stevens also reported silencing a Confederate battery.

The battery participated in the early stages of the Siege of Petersburg. It served on an expedition to Reams Station before leaving the Petersburg front. On July 10, 1864, Stevens' battery was sent to the defenses of Washington, D. C. The battery served in VI Corps operations as far as Harpers Ferry, West Virginia, for the remainder of July.

Cpt Stevens served in the Army of the Shenandoah under MG Philip Sheridan. This included serious fighting at the Battle of Opequon and the Battle of Cedar Creek. At Opequon, the 5th Maine supported the advance of first division VI Corps. The guns were advanced four times toward Winchester as the battle progressed. At Cedar Creek, Stevens' battery covered the right flank of second division VI Corps when it made its final stand against the Confederate assault. Both Wright and Sheridan recommended Stevens for promotion for his efforts.

The 5th Maine Battery remained in the Army of the Shenandoah, in the artillery brigade commanded by Maj Albert W. Bradbury, to the end of the war. Stevens was mustered out of the volunteer service on July 6, 1865. He had received brevet rank of major on February 14, 1865, to rank from October 19, 1864.

== Post war ==
Stevens served in the Maine Legislature. He served in the House of Representatives in 1875 and in the senate in 1877–1878. Beginning in 1888, Maj Stevens served two terms as sheriff of Kennebec County before becoming probate judge in 1892. Judge Stevens also served on Maine's commission for monuments on the Gettysburg battlefield. He also was involved in his battery's veterans' association.

Stevens married Mary Ann Yeaton on March 25, 1856. They had three children, but only son Don Carlos, a Unitarian minister, survived him. Stevens died in Augusta, Maine, on December 22, 1918, and was buried in Woodside Cemetery in Belgrade.
