= Gulfport, Florida =

- City
- City of Gulfport
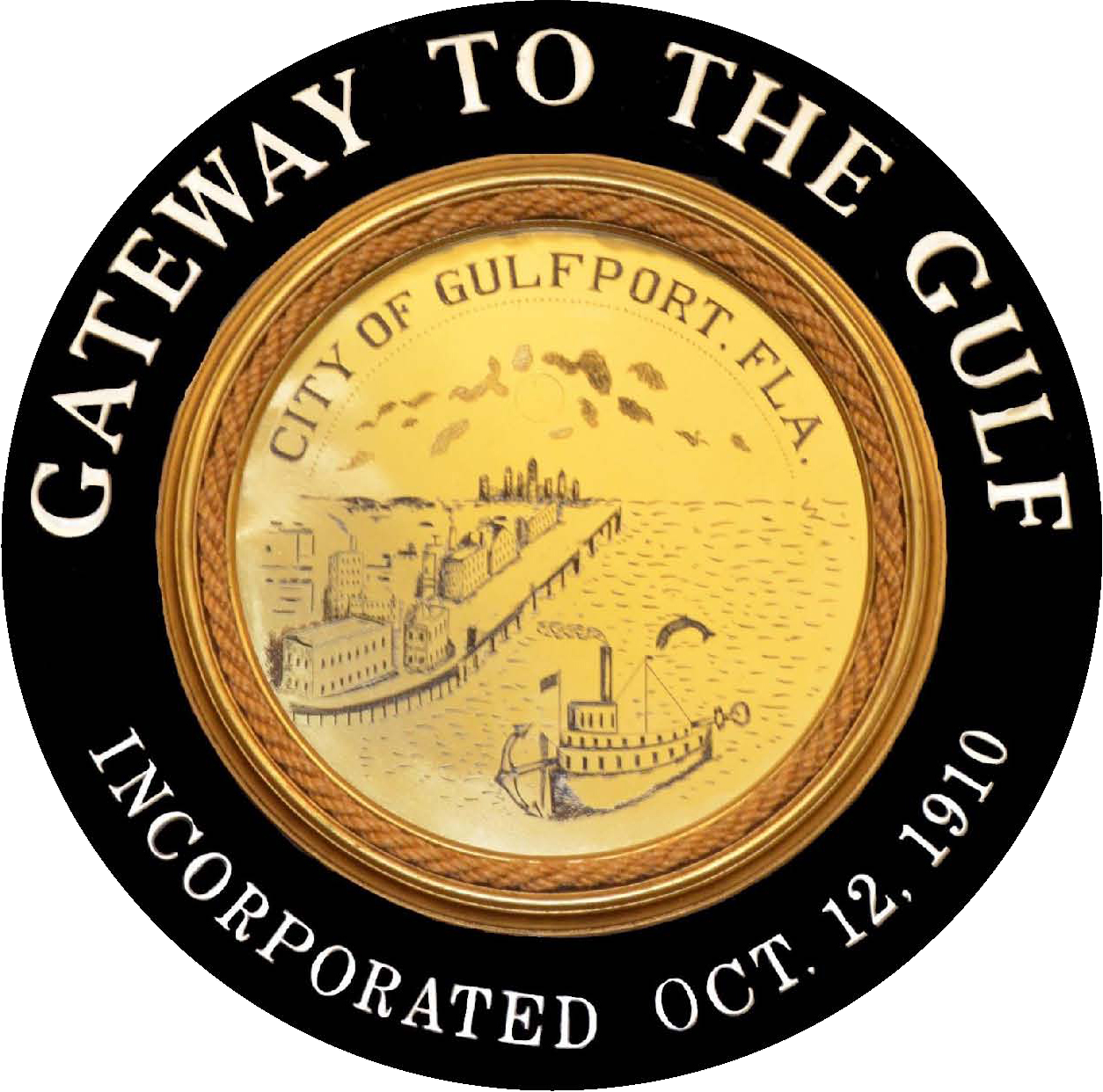
- Seal

- Location in Pinellas County and the state of Florida
- Coordinates: 27°45′06″N 82°42′39″W
- Country: United States
- State: Florida
- County: Pinellas
- Incorporated: October 12, 1910

Government
  - Mayor: Karen Love
  - City Manager: James E. O'Reilly

Area
  - Total: 3.87 sq mi (10.02 km^{2})
  - Land: 2.76 sq mi (7.16 km^{2})
  - Water: 1.10 sq mi (2.86 km^{2})
- Elevation: 13 ft (4.0 m)

Population (2020)
  - Total: 11,783
  - Density: 4,261.6/sq mi (1,645.41/km^{2})
- Time zone: UTC-5 (Eastern (EST))
  - Summer (DST): UTC-4 (EDT)
- ZIP codes: 33707, 33711, 33737
- Area code: 727
- FIPS code: 12-28175
- GNIS feature ID: 2403772
- Website: www.mygulfport.us

Gulfport is a city in Pinellas County, Florida, United States, bordering St. Petersburg, South Pasadena, and Boca Ciega Bay. The population of Gulfport was 11,783 at the 2020 census. Gulfport is part of the Tampa–St. Petersburg–Clearwater metropolitan statistical area.

== History ==
Archaeological digs around Boca Ciega Bay indicate that settlements existed in the area circa 8000 to 3000 BC. The area was also densely populated during the Safety Harbor period. In 1528, the Spanish explorer Pánfilo de Narváez landed on the Pinellas peninsula, some say near present-day Gulfport, where he encountered the local Timucuan people.

Gulfport has been known by several names since its founding. The first settler in what would become Gulfport were James and Rebecca Barnett in 1868, and named the area Barnett's Bluff. As other settlers trickled in and homesteaded the area, the settlement became known as Bonifacio around 1880. In 1884, Philadelphia financier Hamilton Disston envisioned a thriving port town that he called Disston City. However, the United States Postal Service would not recognize the name as it conflicted with a town in Hillsborough County, and the name Bonifacio was retained. Once that community folded in 1890, the Post Office allowed Bonifacio to be renamed as Disston City. In 1905, the town name was changed to Veteran City to reflect John Chase's vision for a retirement community of Civil War veterans. On October 12, 1910, the name changed officially to Gulfport when it got incorporated at the Gulf Casino located on the dock of Electric Railroad Company.

On April 1, 1886, a man named W. J. McPherson, who had moved to Disston City from Deland the previous year, published The Sea Breeze, which was the first newspaper for the lower Pinellas Peninsula. With a population of about 150 people, Disston City was the largest settlement on the lower peninsula in the 1880s.

During the first two decades of the 20th century, there was a considerable leftist movement in Florida. This included Gulfport electing E. E. Wintersgill, a Socialist mayor, in 1910 and having four Socialists to one Democrat sitting on the town's council.

Gulfport was a sundown town into the 1950s. An informal policy prohibited African Americans from staying within town limits after sundown.

=== Hurricane Helene Damage ===
On Thursday, September 26, 2024, The storm surge from Cat 4 Hurricane Helene started affecting the areas around Gulfport. A storm surge up to 8 feet high swamped the downtown area of Gulfport and the surrounding residential areas, causing significant and heavy damage. As of 2025, cleanup and damage survey is still ongoing.

The city of Gulfport, Mississippi helped the city following Hurricane Helene by gathering donations for those affected.

== Geography ==
The city borders St. Petersburg, South Pasadena, and Boca Ciega Bay.

According to the United States Census Bureau, the city has a total area of 3.8 square miles (9.8 km^{2}), of which 2.8 square miles (7.3 km^{2}) is land and 1.0 square mile (2.6 km^{2}) (26.30%) is water.

== Demographics ==
Historical population
Census	Pop.	Note	%±
1930	851		—
1940	1,581		85.8%
1950	3,702		134.2%
1960	9,730		162.8%
1970	9,976		2.5%
1980	11,180		12.1%
1990	11,727		4.9%
2000	12,527		6.8%
2010	12,029		−4.0%
2020	11,783		−2.0%
U.S. Decennial Census

=== Racial and ethnic composition ===
Gulfport racial composition (Hispanics excluded from racial categories) (NH = Non-Hispanic)
Race	Pop 2010	Pop 2020	% 2010	% 2020
White (NH)	9,929	9,557	82.54%	81.11%
Black or African American (NH)	1,086	722	9.03%	6.13%
Native American or Alaska Native (NH)	46	36	0.38%	0.31%
Asian (NH)	146	158	1.21%	1.34%
Pacific Islander or Native Hawaiian (NH)	12	17	0.10%	0.14%
Some other race (NH)	25	67	0.21%	0.57%
Two or more races/Multiracial (NH)	192	504	1.60%	4.28%
Hispanic or Latino (any race)	593	722	4.93%	6.13%
Total	12,029	11,783	100.00%	100.00%

=== 2020 census ===
As of the 2020 census, Gulfport had a population of 11,783. The median age was 57.1 years. 10.0% of residents were under the age of 18 and 33.4% of residents were 65 years of age or older. For every 100 females there were 85.3 males, and for every 100 females age 18 and over there were 84.0 males age 18 and over.

100.0% of residents lived in urban areas, while 0.0% lived in rural areas.

There were 6,263 households in Gulfport, of which 12.3% had children under the age of 18 living in them. Of all households, 34.0% were married-couple households, 21.2% were households with a male householder and no spouse or partner present, and 36.2% were households with a female householder and no spouse or partner present. About 42.7% of all households were made up of individuals, and 22.0% had someone living alone who was 65 years of age or older.

There were 7,472 housing units, of which 16.2% were vacant. The homeowner vacancy rate was 2.2% and the rental vacancy rate was 9.1%.

=== 2020 ACS and QuickFacts ===
According to 2020 ACS 5-year estimates, there were 3,004 families residing in the city.

In 2020, there were 1.87 persons per household and 87.7% lived in the same house as 1 year prior. The population per square mile was 4,255. There were 998 veterans in the city and 8.7% of the population were foreign born.

In 2020, the median value of owner-occupied housing units was $252,500. The median selected monthly owner costs with a mortgage was $1,564. The median selected monthly owner costs without a mortgage was $573. The median gross rent was $1,211. The median household income was $56,896 and the per capita income was $42,374. 12.9% of the population lived below the poverty threshold.

In 2020, 96.6% of households had a computer and 89.5% had a broadband internet subscription. 95.4% of the population over the age of 25 had a high school degree or higher. 42.5% of that same population had a bachelor's degree or higher.

=== 2010 census ===
As of the 2010 census, there were 12,029 people, 5,899 households, and 2,842 families residing in the city.

== Media ==
GTV640 is the local Government-access television (GATV) cable TV channel for Gulfport. The signal was moved to channel 640 on February 9, 2015, on Bright House Networks. The municipal government broadcasts live meetings and replays on Brighthouse Cable Channel 640, as well as Live Streaming Video on the internet.

The channel includes city information, information relating to the city's events, a historical video of the city, city meetings, as well as additional programming.

== Education ==
Public education is provided by Pinellas County Schools. Gulfport has two public schools, Boca Ciega High School and Gulfport Elementary School. The closest middle school to Gulfport is Thurgood Marshall Fundamental Middle School, located in St. Petersburg.

Gulfport Elementary was the first Montessori school in Pinellas County.

The Gulfport Public Library is located on Beach Boulevard, not far from the Gulfport Multi-Purpose Senior Center and the Catherine Hickman Theater. It is a member of the Pinellas Public Library Cooperative, which facilitates inter-library borrowing of materials in the county.

Stetson University College of Law, founded in 1900, is located in Gulfport (having moved there in 1954 from its original location in DeLand). Its tower is one of the better-known images to locals and has become an iconic part of the skyline.

St. Petersburg College, a state college, has multiple campuses in the county and is available for those who aspire to a college degree. In addition, the city of St. Petersburg has a campus of the University of South Florida.

== Culture ==
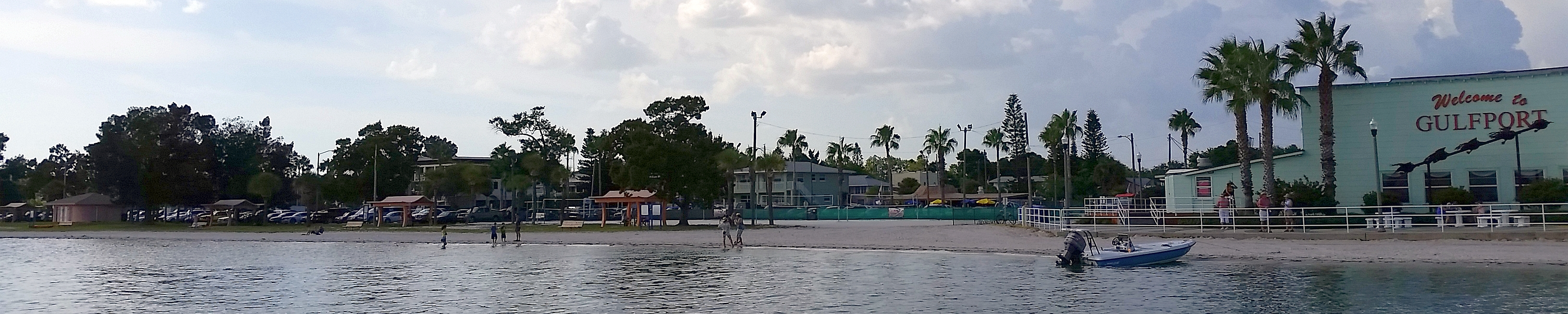
Gulfport's beach on Boca Ciega Bay, with 'Welcome to Gulfport' sign on the back of the Casino Ballroom; the Williams Pier is just outside the photograph on the right.

The downtown area has several art galleries as well as the Catherine A. Hickman Theater, a small performing arts center. Gulfport also hosts street festivals throughout the year. Monthly highlights include Art Walk on the first Friday and IndieFaire on the third Saturday of each month. Yearly features include February's Get Rescued, benefiting local animal rescues, and September's GeckoFest, which consists of several events throughout the month including the Gecko PubCrawl, Gecko Ball, and of course, the election of the Gecko Queen. Many street performers, artists, and craftspeople show up to create a relaxed cultured atmosphere in the warm balmy breezes coming off the beach at the end of the street.

The Gulfport Community Players present several plays each year at the Hickman Theater. Also, the Catherine A. Hickman Theater of Gulfport is located on Beach Boulevard at 26th Avenue South and is a venue for live theatrical performances. The Gulfport Senior Center offers activities throughout the week for residents within and outside of the city limits.

The Gulfport Casino Ballroom, located on the waterfront, is one of the main event venues in the city. The Casino hosts Swing, Latin, Argentine Tango, and Ballroom Dance events five days a week with a large turnout from all across the Tampa area. The venue is available for rent to the public and is popular for weddings, company functions, and holiday parties. The ballroom features a 5,000-square-foot (460 m^{2}) authentic 1930s style dance floor.

In 2011 Gulfport was named a finalist by Rand McNally for one of the best food towns in the United States.

=== Recreation ===
The city owns a full-service marina adjacent to Clam Bayou Nature Park.

Gulfport's Police Department includes a marine patrol which is responsible for the open waterway between Gulfport, St. Pete Beach, the Maximo neighborhood in St. Pete, and the Pinellas Bayway. They also patrol 5 miles (8.0 km) of coastline along the Boca Ciega Bay.

There is a long municipal fishing pier, called Williams Pier, on Boca Ciega Bay. It's near the Casino Ballroom and not far from two Gulfport city parks, Veterans Park and the waterfront park and beach.

== Gallery ==
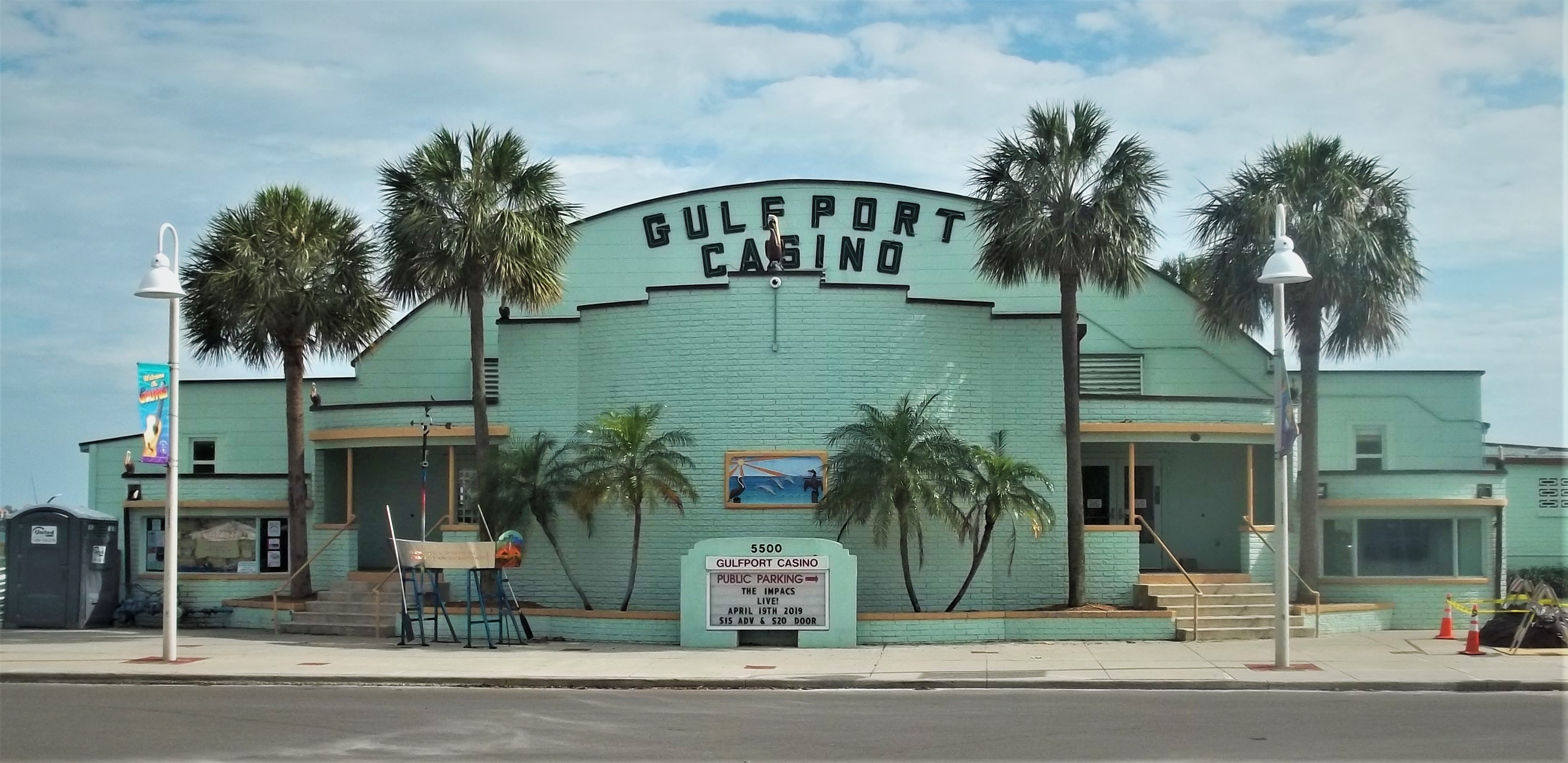
The Gulfport Casino was built in 1930 as a community center and entertainment venue

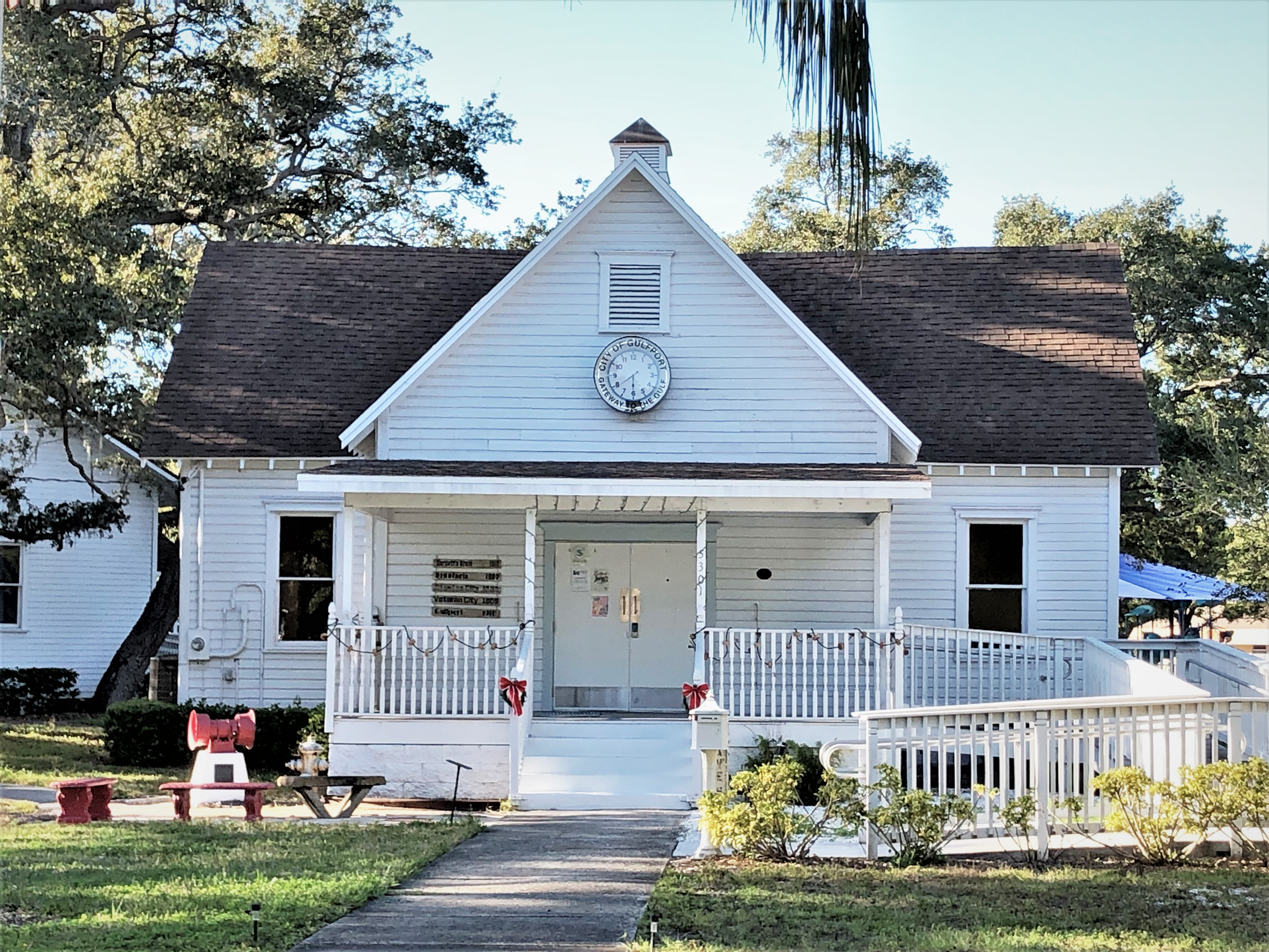
The Gulfport History Museum is the home of Gulfport Arts and Heritage

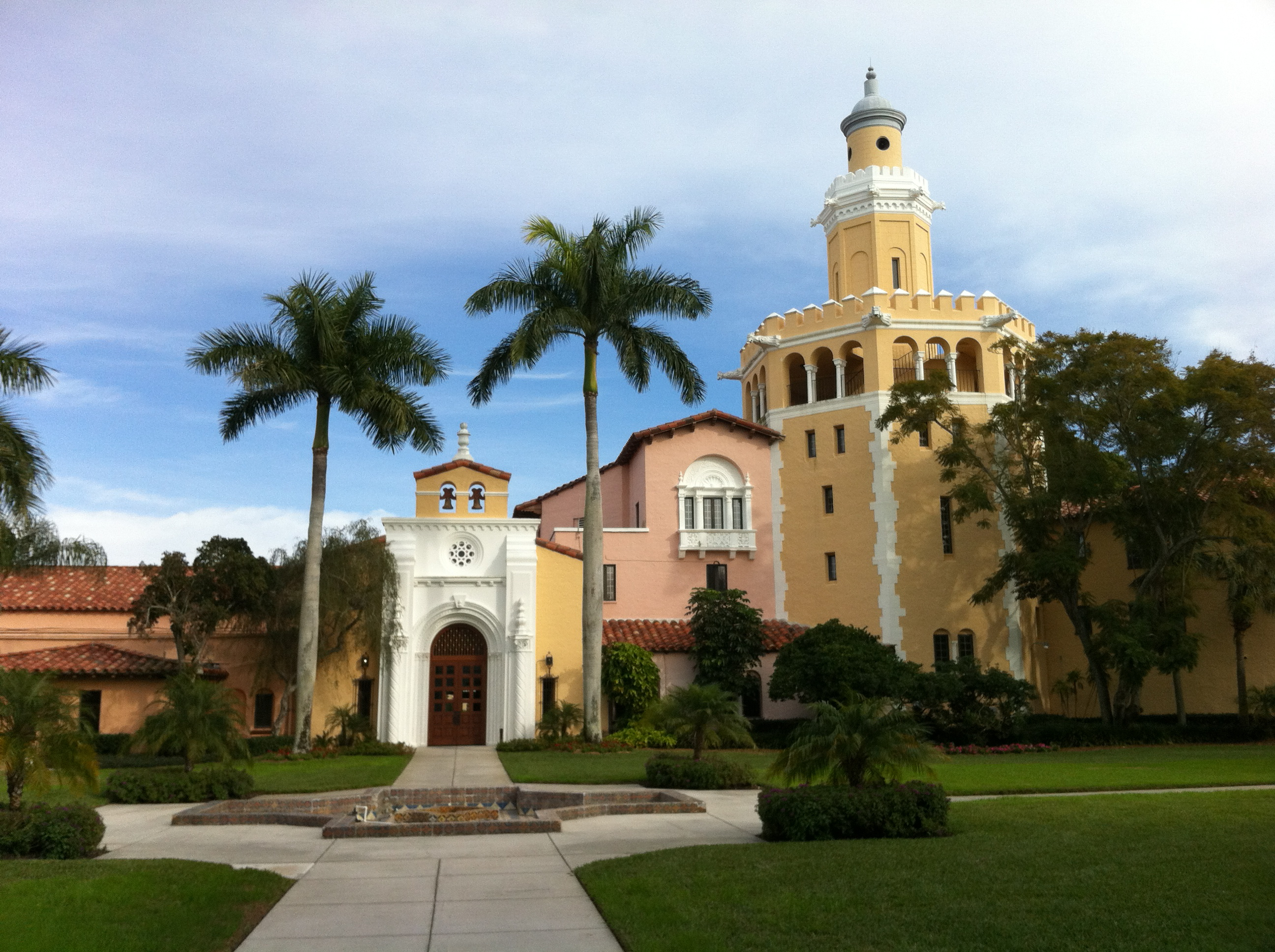
The Law School of Stetson University is located in Gulfport

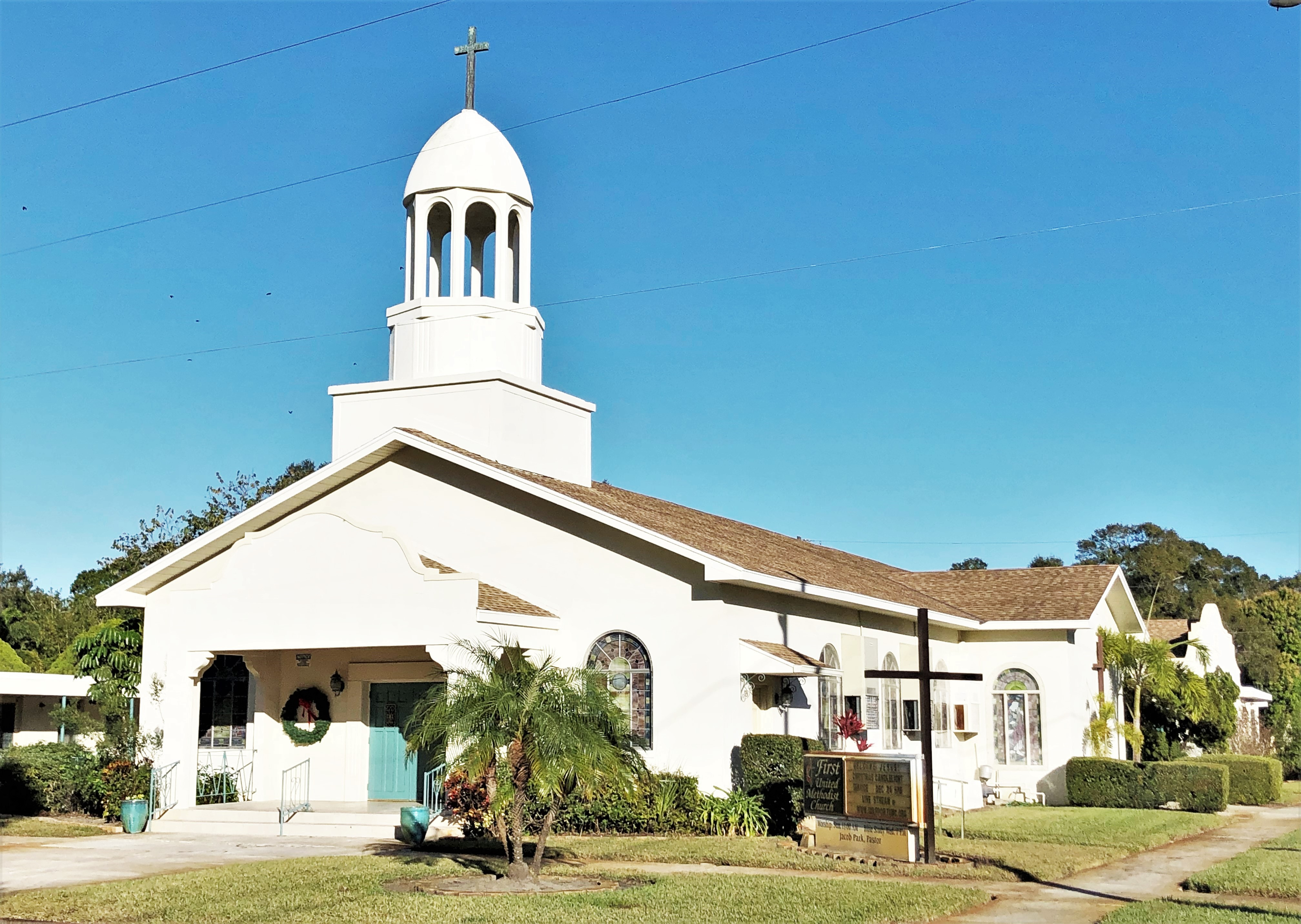
The First United Methodist Church is one of many churches in Gulfport

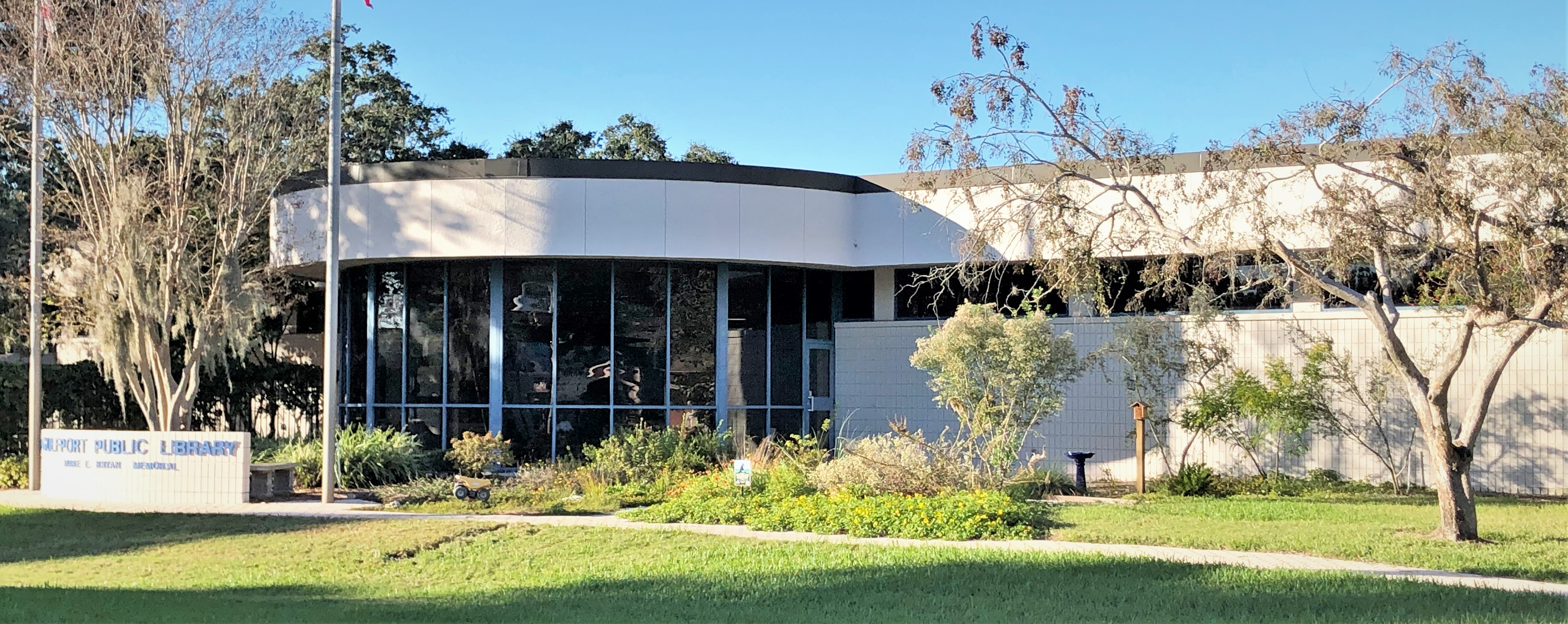
The Gulfport Public Library

== See also ==
- List of sundown towns in the United States
