= Louis J. Sacriste =

American Civil War Medal of Honor recipient (1843–1904)

First Lieutenant Louis Jeanottelle Sacriste
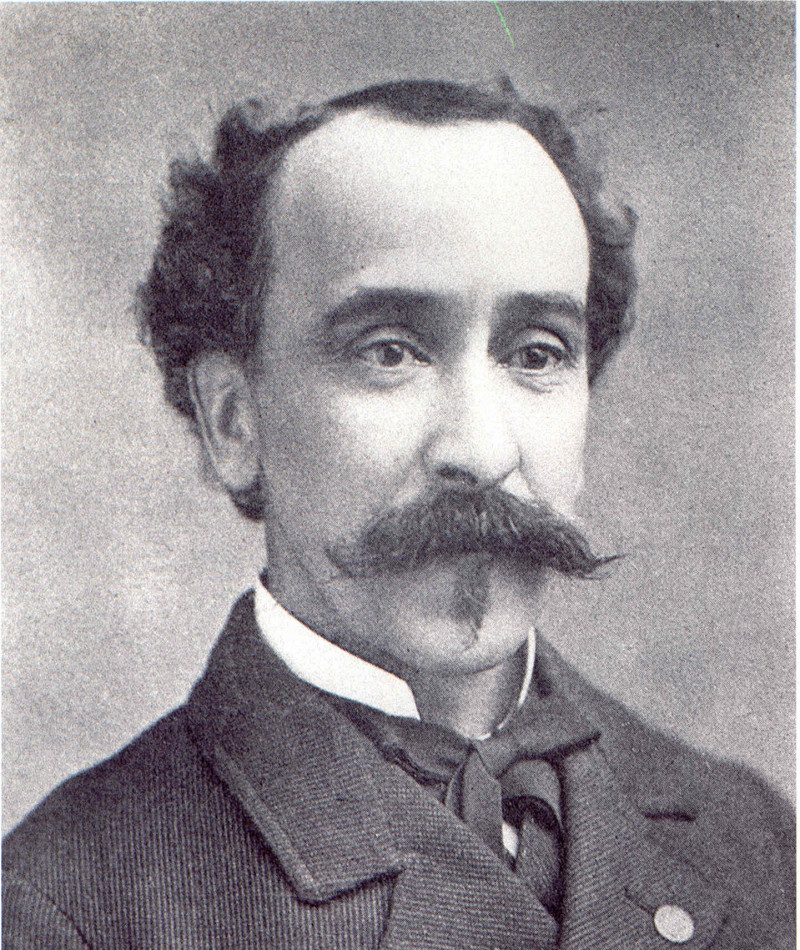
- Sacriste in 1865
- Born: June 15, 1843; Wilmington, Delaware, US
- Died: August 18, 1904 (aged 61); La Grange, Illinois, US
- Burial place: Mount Carmel Catholic Cemetery, Hillside, Illinois
- Military career
- Allegiance: United States (Union)
- Branch: Army
- Service years: 1861–1865
- Rank: Brevet Major
- Units: Company D, 116th Pennsylvania Infantry Regiment
- Conflicts: Battle of Chancellorsville; First Battle of Auburn
- Awards: Medal of Honor

Louis Jeanottelle Sacriste (June 15, 1843 – August 18, 1904) was a first lieutenant (also brevet major) in the United States Army who was awarded the Medal of Honor for gallantry during the American Civil War. He was issued the medal on January 31, 1889, for actions he performed in the battles of Chancellorsville and Auburn in 1863.

== Personal life ==
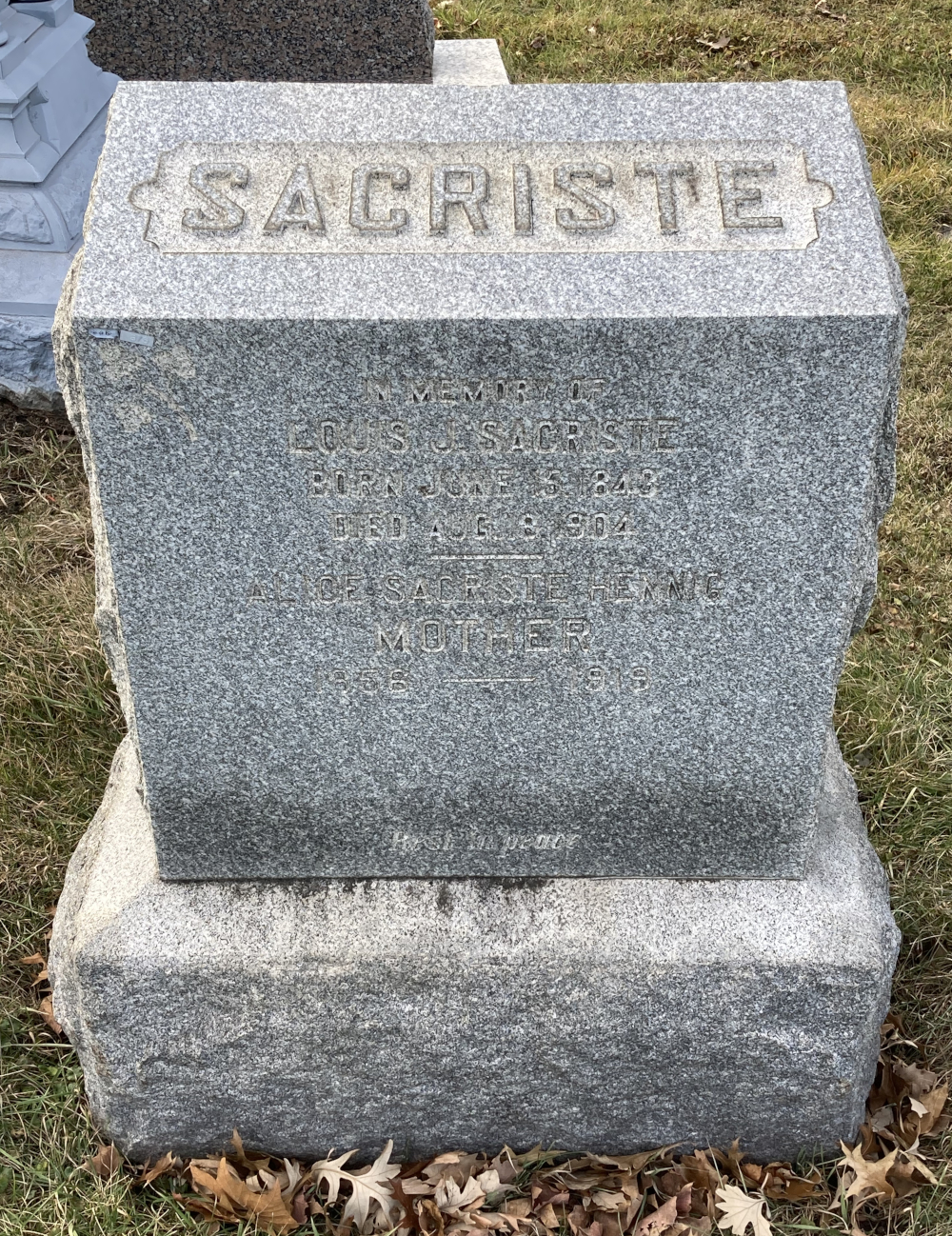
Sacriste's grave at Mount Carmel Cemetery

Sacriste was born on June 15, 1843, in Wilmington, Delaware. He died on August 18, 1904, in La Grange, Illinois, and was buried in Mount Carmel Catholic Cemetery in Hillside, Illinois. He is known to have fathered three children.

== Military service ==
Sacriste enlisted in the Army on January 9, 1863, in Philadelphia, Pennsylvania, as a second lieutenant. On September 1, 1862, he was assigned to Company F of the 116th Pennsylvania Infantry. On March 1, 1863, he was promoted to first lieutenant and transferred to Company D of the 116th. He was subsequently promoted to adjutant on November 21, 1863, but was subsequently wounded at the Battle of Cold Harbor on June 3, 1864. Afterwards, on September 22, 1864, he was promoted to captain, and then to brevet major on March 13, 1865.

On May 3, 1863, while still a first lieutenant, Sacriste saved from capture a gun of the 5th Maine Battery. Later, on October 14, 1863, he saved from destruction the line of the 1st Division, Second Army Corps.

Sacriste later described these actions in writing:

I was a second lieutenant commanding Co. D, One hundred and sixteenth Pennsylvania Volunteers, Meagher's Irish Brigade, Hancock's First Division, Second Corps. At Chancellorsville, Saturday night, May 2nd, 1863, our brigade deployed near Scotts Mills and when General 'Stonewall' Jackson charged the Eleventh Corps under Howard, we had orders to prevent a possible stampede, but met with little success. Early the next morning we received orders to move to the front. As we neared the Chancellor House, and before we formed in line of

battle, the enemy's shells killed a number of the brigade, because, for some reason, it countermarched while under fire of the enemy's batteries. We then formed in line of battle, my company being on the extreme left of the brigade, at the edge of the clearing around the Chancellor House.

As we were forming, the Fifth Maine Battery under Captain Le Peine took up position between our left and the Chancellor House and opened fire at once with excellent effect, which, however, was only temporary.

General Stuart placed thirty cannon in position and opened upon us with telling result. The man on my right was literally cut in two by a shell; the man on my left, had both legs cut off; the man in my front had a piece of his skull carried away, and the ground was covered with the dead and wounded. Men and horses of our battery were mowed down with such rapidity, that in less than an hour every gun, with one exception, was silenced, and but two noble fellows, Corporal Charles Lebrooke and Private John F. Chase, remained at their posts. Captain LePeine was mortally wounded. After the officers were disabled, a lieutenant of the regular army took command, but in a few minutes he too was fatally wounded.

So accurate was the enemy's fire, that one of their shells exploded as it struck the mouth of one of our cannon, sending the pieces inside; another shell exploded one of the ammunition chests, the Chancellor House was set on fire, and smoke and dust added to the confusion. The line appeared to melt away and the front to pass out, while soldiers and riderless horses hurried down the road to the rear in something like a panic.

I was in command of the left company of my regiment and brigade, and, seeing the enemy's infantry advancing, called on my comrades to follow me. I led them through the dust, smoke, and the fire of thirty cannon, into the face of Stuart's men, reached the battery, and brought off the first gun in triumph from the

field. My example was followed by others of my regiment and brigade, and every gun and caisson was saved. A few minutes later the enemy had possession of the field.

— Louis J. Sacriste, That's the Last You'll See of Sacriste – 3 May 1863, Deeds of Valor

Second action:

On the night of the 13th of October, 1863, during a retrograde movement of the army, I was ordered, with twenty-five picked men from my regiment (One hundred and sixteenth Pennsylvania Volunteers) to report to Colonel James A. Beaver, commanding the

picket line of the First Division, Second Corps. Early in the morning of the 14th, while the division and train were crossing Cedar Creek, Ewell's Corps attacked our line with such determination that it was about 11 o'clock A. M. before we forced the position, which we did by turning our flank and securing the ford and road over which our division and train had passed. By this movement the entire line was cut off from the rest of the army, our troops being nearly surrounded, and on the same side of the stream confronting Ewell's Corps. Colonel Beaver, seeing the critical position and danger of capture or destruction of his entire command, and perceiving but one avenue of escape, requested me to proceed along the line, which was heavily engaged and stubbornly contesting the ground, inform the officers of the situation, and direct them as to the route of march, which was to fall back slowly on the same side of the creek with the enemy, cross the stream south of the ford, and then march diagonally across the country to rejoin the division.

As we started to obey the order of Colonel Beaver, one of my men remarked to another in my hearing, 'That's the last you'll see of Sacriste.' Colonel Beaver's instructions were carried out to the letter. As we were falling back, however, I discovered that one detail on the extreme right, commanded by a lieutenant of the One hundred and fortieth Pennsylvania Volunteers, had been overlooked in my first instructions.

A second time I went in, and succeeded in saving this as well as the rest of the line, the command in the meantime being hard pressed, and closely engaged by cavalry, infantry, and artillery. Considering all the circumstances, the escape of the line was remarkable, and our action and stubborn courage made us the ideal of a rear guard.

— Louis J. Sacriste, That's the Last You'll See of Sacriste – 14 October 1863, Deeds of Valor

Sacriste was mustered out of service on March 6, 1865, in Alexandria, Virginia, and was awarded the Medal of Honor, accredited to Nebraska, on January 31, 1889. His Medal of Honor citation reads:

The President of the United States of America, in the name of Congress, takes pleasure in presenting the Medal of Honor to First Lieutenant (Infantry) Louis Jeanottelle Sacriste, United States Army, for extraordinary heroism on 3 May 1863, while serving with Company D, 116th Pennsylvania Infantry, in action at Chancellorsville, Virginia. First Lieutenant Sacriste saved from capture a gun of the 5th Maine Battery. At Auburn, Virginia, on 14 October 1863, he voluntarily carried orders which resulted in saving from destruction or capture the picket line of the 1st Division, 2d Army Corps.

— W. C. Endicott
