= Gulfport Casino =

- U.S. National Register of Historic Places
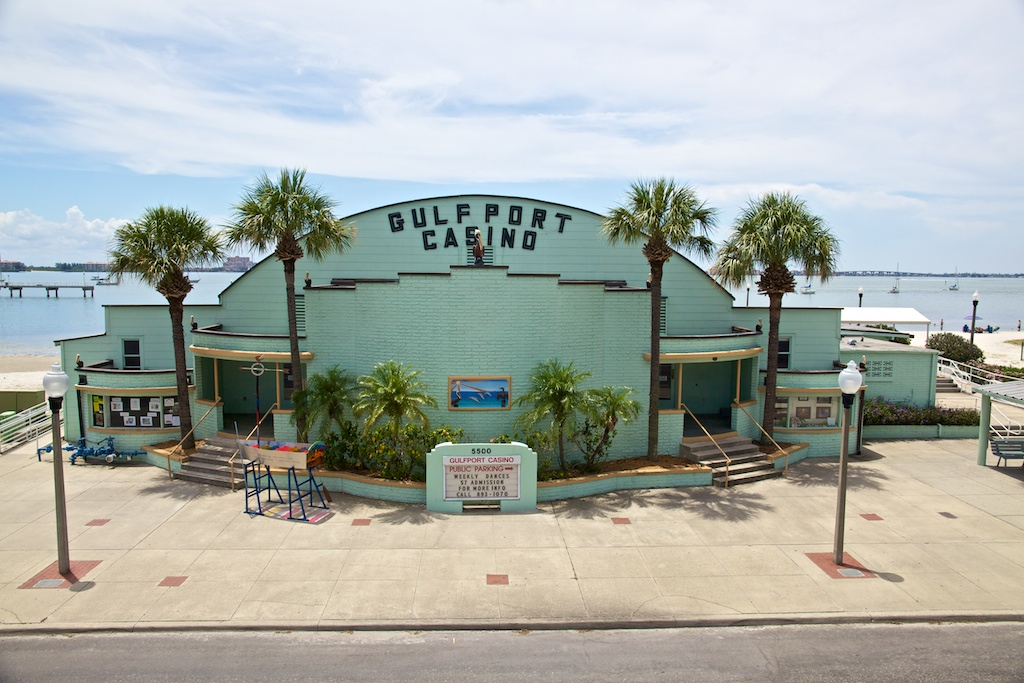

- Location within Florida Location within the United States
- Location: Gulfport, Florida
- Coordinates: 28°01′11″N 82°47′24″W
- NRHP reference No.: 14000477
- Added to NRHP: August 8, 2014

Gulfport Casino is a national historic site located at 5500 Shore Blvd., Gulfport, Florida in Pinellas County. Built at the end of the dock into the bay in 1906 as station and ticket office, the building contained a post office and a refreshment stand. The current building was reconstructed in the 1930s.

It was added to the National Register of Historic Places on August 8, 2014.
