= Edward N. Whittier =

American military officer

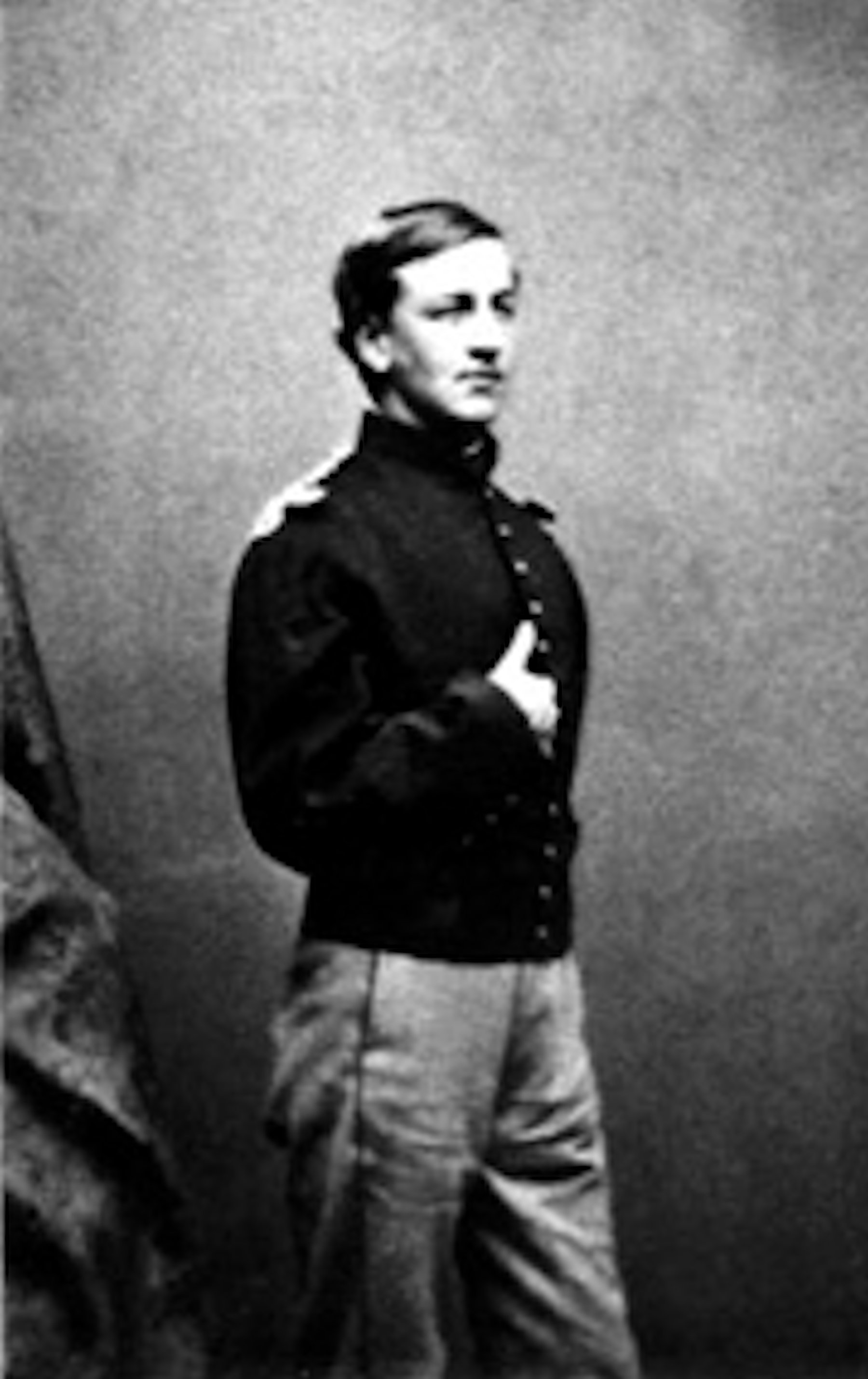
- Born: July 1, 1840; Portland, Maine
- Died: June 14, 1902 (aged 61); Maine
- Burial place: Pierce Cemetery, Cumberland County, Maine
- Military career
- Allegiance: United States
- Branch: United States Army; Union Army
- Rank: Captain
- Unit: 5th Battery Maine Light Artillery
- Conflicts: American Civil War • Battle of Fisher's Hill
- Awards: Medal of Honor

Edward Newton Whittier (July 1, 1840 – June 14, 1902) was a Union Army officer during the American Civil War. He took temporary command of the 5th Maine Battery when Captain Greenlief T. Stevens was wounded at the Battle of Gettysburg. Whittier received the Medal of Honor for gallantry during the Battle of Fisher's Hill near Strasburg, Virginia fought September 21–22, 1864. The battle was one of the engagements of the Valley Campaigns of 1864.

Whittier was later breveted to the rank of captain. He was a companion of the Massachusetts Commandery of the Military Order of the Loyal Legion of the United States.

== Medal of Honor citation ==
“The President of the United States of America, in the name of Congress, takes pleasure in presenting the Medal of Honor to First Lieutenant (Field Artillery) Edward Newton Whittier, United States Army, for extraordinary heroism on 22 September 1864, while serving with Battery 5, Maine Light Artillery, in action at Fisher's Hill, Virginia. While acting as assistant adjutant general, Artillery Brigade, 6th Army Corps, First Lieutenant Whittier went over the enemy's works, mounted, with the assaulting column, to gain quicker possession of the guns and to turn them upon the enemy.”

== See also ==
- List of Medal of Honor recipients
- List of American Civil War Medal of Honor recipients: T-Z
