= Gulfport Public Library =

Coordinates: 27.7426°N 82.7079°W

The Gulfport Public Library serves the city of Gulfport, in Pinellas County, Florida, United States. It is located at 5501 28th Ave South, Gulfport, Florida 33707. It is a member of the Pinellas Public Library Cooperative. The library provides access to genealogical research via Ancestry.com in the library. It also participates in the Florida Memory Project via the Florida Photography Collection. Gulfport Public Library also provides access to digital content in the form of e-books through participation with Project Gutenberg and other e-book services. In 2018, the Gulfport Public Library received the GLBTRT Newlen-Symons Award for Excellence in Serving the LGBT Community.

== History ==
Prior to the founding of the Gulfport Public Library, the need for such a resource was recognized by Julia Lucky who, in 1935, started a small library from her own collection and donations from friends in the back of a drugstore.

When Lucky's house burned down and she moved away, a new group took up the task of attempting to establish a local library which opened on May 15, 1935. This group was headed by Mayor Andrew Potter and his wife, who formed a Library Group of people dedicated towards working on building the library. The appointed Librarian at this time was Mrs. Margaret Clees and it was kept in a small one room building that had been a former real estate office. The library eventually moved into a five-room bungalow where it would remain through a series of additions until 1976.

The original citizen lead library was eventually made official when the town voted for the library to be supported by tax levy. The library continued to grow in the coming decades and expanded its services. In 1994, library renovations were undertaken which nearly doubled the size of the library. These renovations included the addition of a meeting room which remains a private room that is used for events throughout the year. The library has since increased its digital usage and become more computerized through the years since these renovations. This has led to educational opportunities including youth programming and kids’ resources, Passport services, GALE legal forms access, Kanopy access, and Hoopla access for library patrons. Additional featured resources advertised by the library include Libby, World Book Online, Pronunciator, fold3 by Ancestry, Pinellas Public Library Cooperative, Novelist Plus, and the LGBTQ Resource Center.

In 2018, the library won the GLBTRT Newlen-Symons Award for Excellence in Serving the GLBT Community. In 2019, the library won the National Medal for Museum & Library Service.

== Services ==
Aside from basic online resources, The Gulfport Public Library offers crisis resources including crisis hotlines; health and mental health resources; resources for veterans; women, children, and family resources; and for services for the homeless. The Gulfport Public Library is also home to the LGBTQ Resource Center.

== LGBTQ Resource Center ==
The LGBTQ Resource Center is a 501(c)3 non-profit organization at the Gulfport Public Library, committed to promoting awareness of the diversity of experiences, contributions and needs of people who are lesbian, gay, bisexual, transgender and/or queer. The LGBTQ Resource center provides educational, social and recreational opportunities through the Gulfport Public Library.

Some of the programs offered by the LGBTQ Resource Center include ArtOUT, an international juried art exhibition, and ReadOUT, a festival of LGBTQ literature. The LGBTQ Resource Center's BranchOUT program also offers scholarships for continuing education to local LGBTQ students.
