= 5th Maine Light Artillery Battery =

- Active: December 4, 1861, to July 6, 1865
- Country: United States
- Allegiance: Union
- Branch: Artillery
- Equipment: 6 12-pdr Napoleons
- Engagements: Battle of Cedar Mountain; Battle of Groveton; Second Battle of Bull Run; Battle of Fredericksburg; Battle of Chancellorsville; Battle of Gettysburg; Bristoe Campaign; Mine Run Campaign; Overland Campaign; Battle of the Wilderness; Battle of Spotsylvania Court House; Battle of Totopotomoy Creek; Battle of Cold Harbor; Siege of Petersburg; Second Battle of Petersburg; Battle of Fort Stevens; Battle of Opequon; Battle of Fisher's Hill; Battle of Cedar Creek

5th Maine Light Artillery Battery was an artillery battery that served in the Union Army during the American Civil War.

== Service ==
The 5th Maine Battery was organized in Augusta, Maine and mustered in for three years' service on December 4, 1861.

The battery was attached to 2nd Division, Department of the Rappahannock, to June 1862. 2nd Division, III Corps, Army of Virginia, to September 1862. 2nd Division, I Corps, Army of the Potomac, to May 1863. Artillery Brigade, I Corps, to April 1864. Artillery Brigade, V Corps, to June 1864. Artillery Brigade, VI Corps, to December 1864. Artillery Brigade, Army of the Shenandoah, to July 1865.

The 5th Maine Battery mustered out of service July 6, 1865, at Augusta, Maine.

== Detailed service ==
Duty at Augusta until March 10, 1862, and at Fort Preble, Portland, Me., until April 1. Moved to Washington, D.C., April 1–3. Camp on Capitol Hill until May 19. Moved to Aquia Creek, then to Fredericksburg, Va., May 19–22. Moved to Front Royal, Va., May 25, 1862, and to Manassas June 17. At Warrenton July 4–22. March to Waterloo July 22, then to Culpeper August 4. Battle of Cedar Mountain August 9. Pope's Campaign in northern Virginia August 16-September 2. Fords of the Rappahannock August 20–23. Thoroughfare Gap August 28. Battle of Groveton August 29, and Second Bull Run August 30. Ordered to Washington September 7, to refit, and duty there until October 24. Moved to Berlin October 24, and then to Lovettsville October 30. Reconnaissance from Bolivar Heights to Rippen, W. Va., November 9. Battle of Fredericksburg December 12–15. "Mud March" January 20–24, 1863. At Fletcher's Chapel until April 28. Chancellorsville Campaign April 28-May 6. Operations at Fitzhugh's Crossing April 29-May 2. Battle of Chancellorsville May 2–5. Battle of Gettysburg, July 1–3. Bristoe Campaign October 9–22. Advance to line of the Rappahannock November 7–8. Mine Run Campaign November 26-December 2. Rapidan Campaign May 4-June 15, 1864. Battles of the Wilderness May 5–7. Spotsylvania May 8–12. Ny River May 10. Spotsylvania Court House May 12–21. North Anna River May 23–26. Line of the Pamunkey May 26–28. Totopotomoy May 28–31. Cold Harbor June 1–12. Before Petersburg June 17–19. Siege of Petersburg June 17-July 9, 1864. Ordered to Washington, D.C. Sheridan's Shenandoah Valley Campaign August 7-November 28. Battle of Opequon, Winchester, September 19. Fisher's Hill September 22. Battle of Cedar Creek October 19. Duty at Strasburg until November 10. Near Winchester until December 28, and at Stevenson's Depot until January 10, 1865. At Frederick, Md., until April 4. At Winchester until June 21. Ordered to Augusta, Me., June 21.

== Casualties ==
The battery lost a total of 33 men during service; 2 officers and 16 enlisted men killed or mortally wounded, 15 enlisted men died of disease.

== Commanders ==
- Captain George F. Leppien
- Captain Greenlief Thurlow Stevens
- Lieutenant Edward Newton Whittier

== Notable members ==
- Private John F. Chase - Medal of Honor recipient for action at the battle of Chancellorsville, May 3, 1863
- Lieutenant Edward N. Whittier - Medal of Honor recipient for action at the battle of Fisher's Hill, September 22, 1864,

Two infantrymen of the Fifth Maine Battery are highlighted in the third chapter of MacKinlay Kantor's Pulitzer Prize-winning novel "Andersonville" (1955).

== See also ==
- List of Maine Civil War units
- Maine in the American Civil War
