= Palm Harbor Museum =

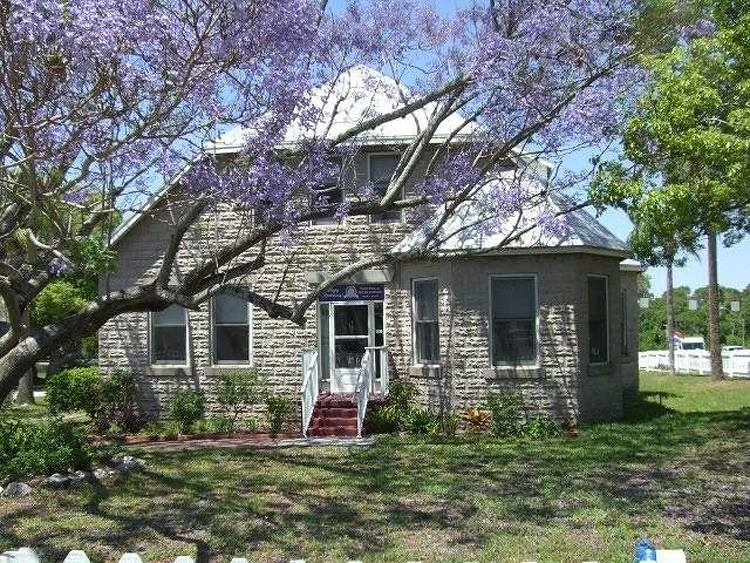
- Front of the museum in 2015
- Established: 1998
- Location: 2043 Curlew Rd, Palm Harbor, Florida
- Coordinates: 28°02′56″N 82°44′51″W
- Type: Local history, historic house
- Collections: Greater Palm Harbor history, North Pinellas citrus and ladder-making industry
- Executive director: Bob Fortner
- Website: www.palmharbormuseum.com

The Palm Harbor Museum is a local history and historic house museum located in the historic Hartley House in Palm Harbor, Florida.

== History ==
=== Hartley House ===
The house was a kit house model purchased from Sears, Roebuck and Co., built by Thomas W. Hartley between 1914 and 1919, on property bought by his father, James Hartley, around 1880. The house was built on a reinforced concrete foundation with rusticated concrete block construction, which was poured on-site, made with sand from a nearby scrub. The outside surfaces of the blocks were cast to simulate a stone finish. Each block weighed 84 pounds, and the blocks were joined with pink mortar. A hall ran the length of the downstairs; walls were reinforced concrete to provide bearing support for the second floor. The upstairs rooms were never completed by the family due to a shortage of funds, leading neighbors to joke that the house was perpetually "under construction." The house was not wired for electricity until 1947.

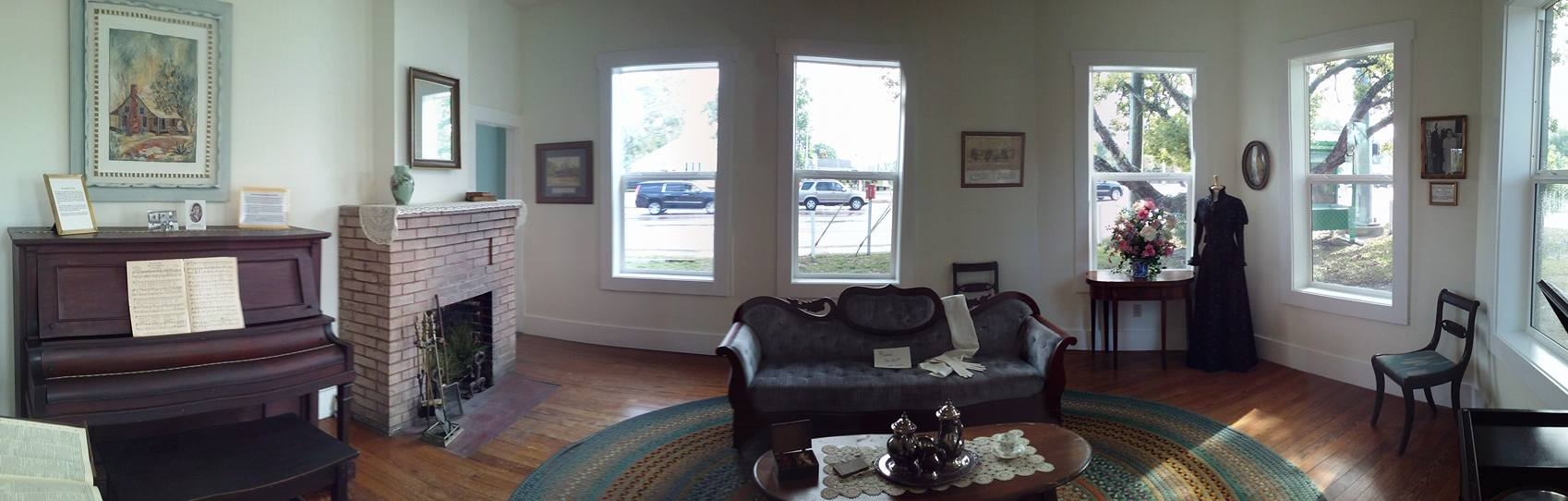
The parlor of the Palm Harbor Museum in 2016

=== Museum ===
Concepts for a museum were first brought to life in 1983 when Jane C. Shelnutt, daughter of Cobb's Landing developer William Luther Cobb, decided with the Palm Harbor Historical Society to exhibit artifacts related to the location's history in a shopping center off of U.S. Highway 19. Inaugurated as the Palm Harbor Historical Museum, it displayed donated objects and items on loan from the Pinellas County Historical Museum, however, the location was never intended to be permanent.

The museum moved from its original location to Florida Avenue in downtown Palm Harbor in 1987, being housed in the Florida Bank of Commerce building. In 1991, the bank's expansion pushed the museum's collection into storage until a new home for the museum could be found. The museum's collection stayed in storage for several years until an effort to find a new location was revitalized in 1993 by Winona and Charley Jones, Palm Harbor natives associated with the historical society who were also involved with the original push for a historic district in downtown Palm Harbor that same year (which succeeded in the creation of the Palm Harbor Historic District in 1994).

The Hartley House was acquired in February 1996 for $140,000 by Pinellas County as part of the extension of Belcher Road, with the building slated for destruction at first. By March 1996, however, the Pinellas County Commission voted to place the building under the management of Heritage Village (formerly the Pinellas County Historical Museum) and the Palm Harbor Historical Society, leasing the property to the latter for $1 a year. Between 1996 and 1998, the county, with minor fundraising efforts from the historical society, spent $185,000 on renovations and associated costs. The Palm Harbor Historical Museum, in its current iteration, opened to the public in November 1998.

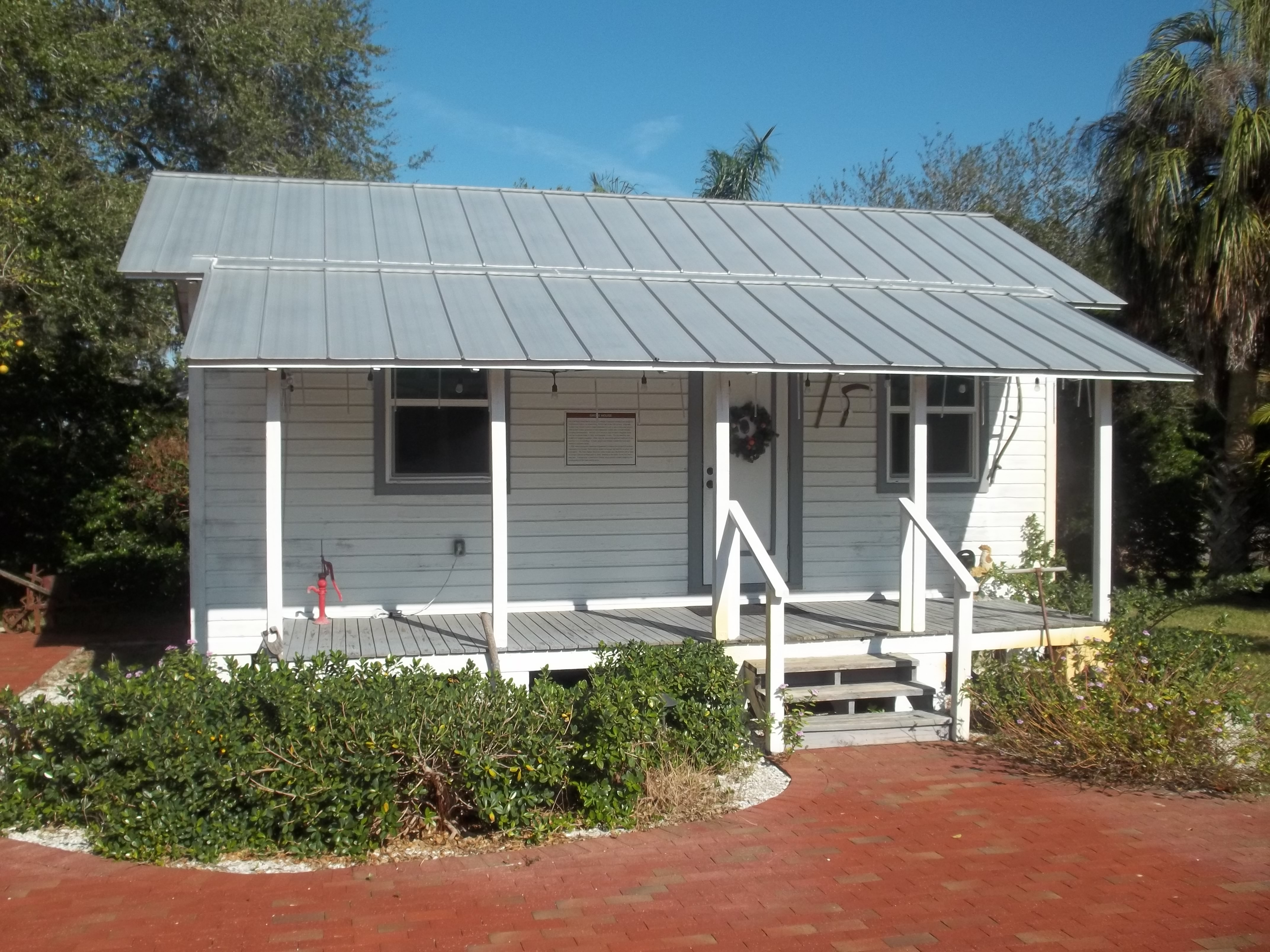
The grove house in 2020

A few years later, in 2002, the name of the museum was changed to the North Pinellas Historical Museum to better represent the communities the museum featured. In 2003, a nearby grove house built during the Great Depression, which housed citrus workers, was donated to the Palm Harbor Historical Society and subsequently moved to the property. With the help of the historical society, Winona Jones, then-director of the museum, published a book, Around Palm Harbor, through Arcadia Publishing in 2005. Jones, who had been caring for the museum since it moved into the Hartley House in 1998, stepped down as director in 2006.

The museum was renamed to Palm Harbor Museum in 2014. The museum hosted an annual bluegrass festival from 2015 to 2018, before it moved to Honeymoon Island State Park. In 2016, the Palm Harbor Museum received a $387,753 State of Florida Cultural Facilities grant to renovate the museum building and grove house, which had only been used as storage space until the building's grand opening in February 2017. The refurbished museum also reopened that same month.

The museum received another grant in 2022 to install an outdoor native plant landscape on the museum's grounds. The grant also allowed for interpretive signage about plants native to Florida, pre-Columbian Americans, and early settlers. Pinellas County Commissioners Charlie Justice and Dave Eggers led the ribbon-cutting ceremony. A wind phone was built on the property the following year.

== Current operation ==
Admission is free, and the museum is run exclusively by volunteers. The museum's stated mission is "to collect, preserve and share the heritage of the Palm Harbor area," which includes the unincorporated communities of North Pinellas, including Palm Harbor, Crystal Beach, Ozona, East Lake, Wall Springs, Lake Tarpon, Curlew, and Indian Bluff Island.

=== Collections and exhibitions ===
Permanent exhibitions are displayed in the downstairs area of the building and include:

- "The Hartley Family," located in the parlor room. The room exhibits items and panels about Thomas W. Hartley, whose family came to Curlew from Danforth, Illinois, and his wife Ida, who came from Madison, Florida. It also features the family's ladder factory, where they produced custom cypress ladders for the local and international citrus industry. Thomas W. Hartley was also a local Methodist lay minister, Rural Free Delivery mail carrier, and justice of the peace.
- "Citrus Industry," housed in the grove house. The small two-room grove house exhibits artifacts and photos of Palm Harbor's former citrus industry, including growing, packing, and shipping from the 1880s to the 1990s. The exhibit was inaugurated alongside the opening of the grove house in February 2017.
- "Faith Mission Children's Home," located in the former boys' bedroom. The exhibit discusses the struggles and successes of an orphanage run by the Markert family (who were former missionaries in the Canary Islands) in Crystal Beach during the 1930s and 1940s.
- "Environmental Alterations: A Land Worth More Than Remembering," located in the former master bedroom. The room displays information and artifacts about early Tocobaga habitation, Spanish exploration, the Seminole Wars, and early settler life in Palm Harbor, Ozona, and Crystal Beach, then known as Bay St. Joseph (later Sutherland), Yellow Bluff, and Seaside, respectively. The room is also furnished with window panels featuring a painting by Tarpon Springs artist Christopher M. Still.
- "Ida's Kitchen," located in the house's original kitchen. The room displays various pieces of cookware common in the early 20th century. The room is named after Ida Hartley who made jars of guava jelly.

Currently, the Palm Harbor Museum's rotating exhibit is "Marriage and Mayhem in the Sunshine State," a exhibit discussing the Duke of Sutherland's 1880s affair with Mary Caroline Blair and subsequent eloping to Dunedin. The exhibit opened in February 2024.

Recent former exhibitions include:

- "The Way We Worked," a traveling exhibition from the Smithsonian Institution about occupations residents of Palm Harbor historically worked, was on display at the museum in November and December 2014.
- "Our Women, Our Places," an exhibit about significant women of North Pinellas and the locations they were associated with. Among the featured women was Myrtle Scharrer Betz who was synonymous with Caladesi Island and spent her later years in Palm Harbor.
- "Revealing African American Contributions in North Pinellas," an exhibit that grappled with Palm Harbor's past as a possible sundown town and the time when the state Ku Klux Klan headquartered there in the 1970s, and highlighted notable Black citizens such as Sheila Johnson, the CEO of the company that owns Innisbrook Resort and Golf Club. The exhibit is currently on loan at Heritage Village's Union Academy building, where it has been since January 2024.

=== Oral history program ===
The museum has an oral history program that interviews residents of the Palm Harbor community. Most participants in the program were interviewed by Sallie Parks, former Pinellas County commissioner and wife of Alden E. Matthews, until her death in 2022.

=== Time capsule ===
After the Space Shuttle Challenger explosion in 1986, a group of citizens of Palm Harbor buried a time capsule in 1987 at H.S. "Pop" Stansell Memorial Park filled with space memorabilia including letters signed by President Ronald Reagan, Vice President George H. W. Bush, and Senator John Glenn to memorialize the disaster. The citizens, led by George Fatolitis, left the time capsule in the hands of the Palm Harbor Historical Society to open in 50 years, rebury, and then reopen 50 years later.
