= Caladesi Island State Park =

State park in Florida, United States

- IUCN category IV (habitat/species management area)
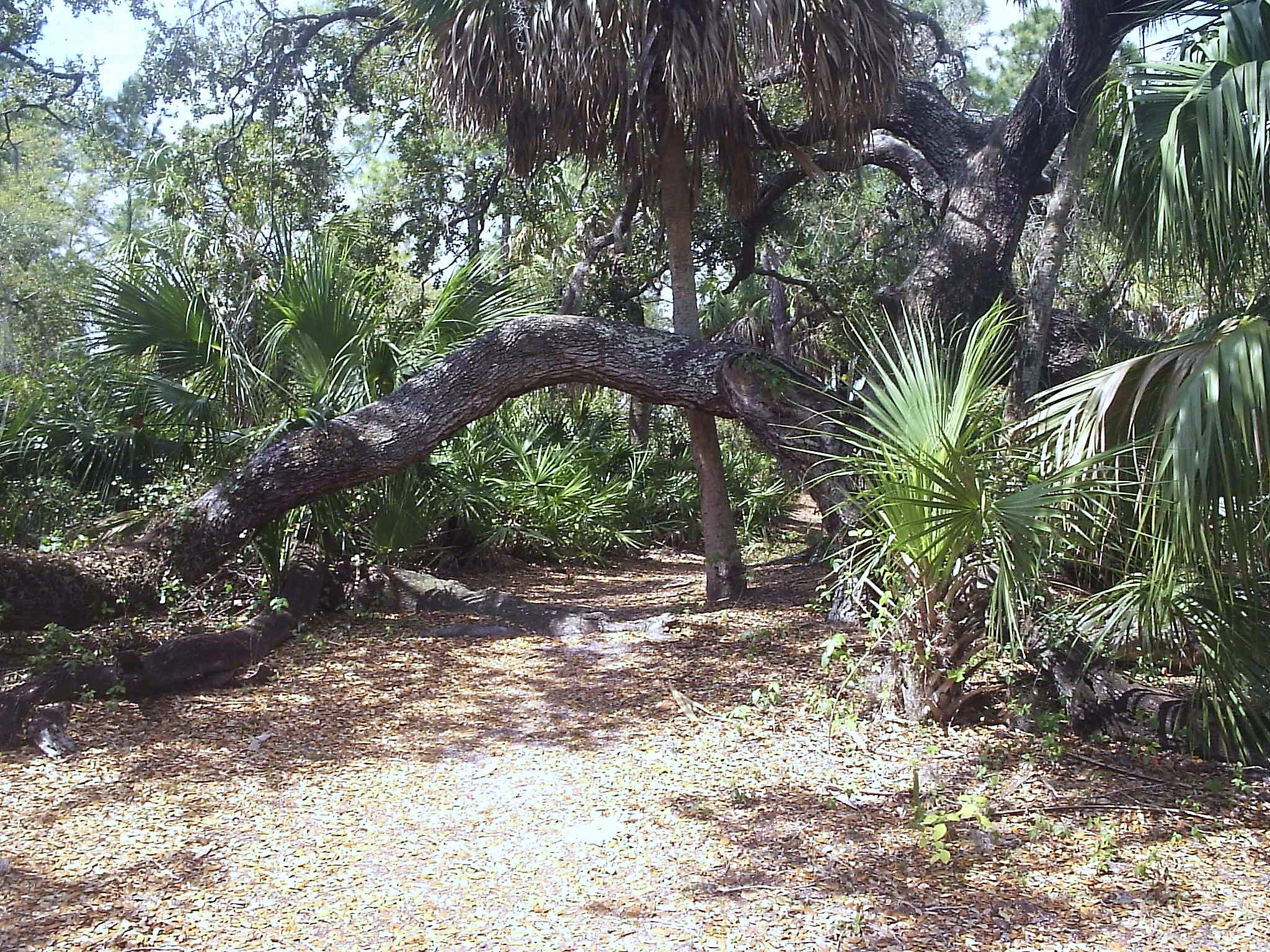
- Nature trail with large live oak limb, a Sabal palm, and saw palmettos on both sides of the path Caladesi Park beach

- Location within Florida Location within the United States
- Interactive map of Caladesi Island State Park
- Location: Pinellas County, Florida, United States
- Nearest city: Dunedin, Florida
- Coordinates: 28°01′12″N 82°49′16″W
- Visitors: 200,000 (in 2010)
- Governing body: Florida Department of Environmental Protection

Caladesi Island State Park is a Florida State Park located on Caladesi Island in the Gulf of Mexico, across St. Joseph Sound to the west of Dunedin, Florida, and north of Clearwater Beach.

It is accessible by passenger ferry or by private boat from a dock on Honeymoon Island, provided primarily for convenience of access from the north (Dunedin area). Alternatively, since the late 1980s, the state park can be reached on foot from Clearwater Beach to the south; it is only separated by a "welcome" sign. Thus, Caladesi Island is not its own island, but shares its island geography with Clearwater Beach.

Amenities include a three-mile nature trail, a marina, picnic pavilions, bathhouses, a park concession stand, and a beach. In 2005, the Caladesi Island beach was listed as having the fourth-best beach in the country; in 2006 and 2007 the second-best; and in 2008 the best beach in the United States by Dr. Beach.

== History ==
Prior to the arrival of Europeans, the Tocobaga resided on or near the island. A number of middens were left there by the Tocabaga or their predecessors, including burial mounds. In the 1500s European explorers first visited the area. Archaeological evidence of a Spanish colonial presence uncovered on nearby Clearwater Island, including rumored remains of two Spanish soldiers and pottery predating Juan Ponce de León's arrival in Florida, suggested links to Caladesi, where a Spanish stirrup was found. Sometime in the 1780s, a Spanish Cuban fisherman, variously called "Desi" or "Caldees", reportedly established a rancho on a bayou (Cala in Spanish) at the southern tip of the island, etymologically contributing to the name Caladesi. Following the 1848 Tampa Bay hurricane the rancho was permanently abandoned. During the latter half of the 19th century Caladesi was known as Hog Island, a name it would hold until 1928, when it was officially renamed Caladesi. It was so named on account of the free-roaming hogs that populated the island. Originally a single, 6-mile-long (9.7 km) barrier island, Caladesi and Honeymoon islands were created in 1921 when a hurricane cut Hurricane Pass to divide the larger island into two parts. Until the 1950s Caladesi was separated from Clearwater Beach by Big (Dunedin) Pass. Starting in 1959, the construction of the Dunedin Causeway caused Big Pass to gradually silt up. Although Caladesi is still referred to as a separate island, Hurricane Elena filled in Dunedin Pass in 1985, making Caladesi Island accessible by walking northward from North Clearwater Beach.

In the 1880s, homesteader Henry Scharrer decided to settle on the island, establishing permanent occupancy there in 1890. Four years later he married Catherine ("Kate") McNally, and in 1895 they birthed their daughter Myrtle Scharrer Betz on the island. In 1902 McNally died, but until 1920 Scharrer maintained his property, which drew prominent visitors into the 1930s, as a tourist attraction. Until his death in 1934 he and Betz lived almost continuously on the island; the latter married Herman Betz in 1915, and after four years in Miami and St. Petersburg the couple returned to Caladesi, moving to the mainland in 1934 just before Sharrer's death. In the 1930s Scharrer expressed his wish to Betz that Caladesi be preserved as a wildlife refuge and recreational area, but until the 1960s such a proposal was regarded as impractical. In 1946 the 157-acre Scharrer homestead was sold to City of Dunedin Commissioner Francis L. Skinner, on the condition that its natural state be retained. In the 1950s the original residential buildings and cabins on the property burned down. In 1967 the Scharrer and other properties on Caladesi were obtained by the State of Florida and made a state park. Later in life, at the age of 87, Betz penned the book Yesteryear I Lived in Paradise, telling of her life on the barrier island. Having died eight years previous, in 2000 she was posthumously honored as a Great Floridian.

== Flora, fauna, and recreation ==
The park contains several natural communities, including coastal dunes, South Florida pine flatwoods, maritime hammocks, coastal strand, and mangrove swamps; mudflats also occur on the island. Common plants include South Florida slash pine (Pinus elliottii var. densa), cabbage palm (Sabal palmetto), live oak (Quercus virginiana), sea oats (Uniola paniculata), dune sunflower (Helianthus debilis), and beach morning glory (Ipomoea pes-caprae), along with red, black, and white mangroves. The coastal strand harbors gopher tortoises and Eastern diamondback rattlesnakes. Many waders use the island, including piping, Wilson's, and snowy plovers and American oystercatchers; in addition, black skimmers and royal and least terns frequent the beach. Roseate spoonbills, great blue herons, and snowy egrets feed in the shallow coastal wetlands. Ospreys commonly nest on the island, and in the past bald eagles have done so as well. 158 species of bird were banded on the island from 1918–35. Additionally, loggerhead and green sea turtles nest on the beach. Red drum, sheepshead, and snook are frequently caught offshore.

The park affords such activities as shelling; boating, including canoeing and kayaking; fishing; hiking; picnicking; swimming and snorkeling; and land-based nature studies, including birding and other wildlife-viewing. Concessions are also available. The concession stand, Café Caladesi, features "casual style beach fare". Its hours vary according to park hours.

== Climate ==
Climate data for Caladesi Island, Florida
| Month | Jan | Feb | Mar | Apr | May | Jun | Jul | Aug | Sep | Oct | Nov | Dec | Year |
|---|---|---|---|---|---|---|---|---|---|---|---|---|---|
| Record high °F (°C) | 89 (32) | 89 (32) | 95 (35) | 92 (33) | 97 (36) | 100 (38) | 102 (39) | 99 (37) | 97 (36) | 94 (34) | 92 (33) | 88 (31) | 102 (39) |
| Mean daily maximum °F (°C) | 69 (21) | 72 (22) | 75 (24) | 80 (27) | 85 (29) | 89 (32) | 90 (32) | 90 (32) | 88 (31) | 82 (28) | 77 (25) | 71 (22) | 81 (27) |
| Mean daily minimum °F (°C) | 50 (10) | 53 (12) | 57 (14) | 62 (17) | 68 (20) | 73 (23) | 75 (24) | 75 (24) | 72 (22) | 66 (19) | 59 (15) | 53 (12) | 64 (18) |
| Record low °F (°C) | 19 (−7) | 23 (−5) | 31 (−1) | 37 (3) | 45 (7) | 51 (11) | 63 (17) | 64 (18) | 55 (13) | 42 (6) | 28 (−2) | 19 (−7) | 19 (−7) |
| Average precipitation inches (mm) | 2.99 (76) | 3.05 (77) | 3.81 (97) | 2.37 (60) | 2.02 (51) | 6.69 (170) | 8.09 (205) | 8.32 (211) | 6.99 (178) | 3.31 (84) | 2.15 (55) | 2.95 (75) | 52.74 (1,339) |

== Images ==
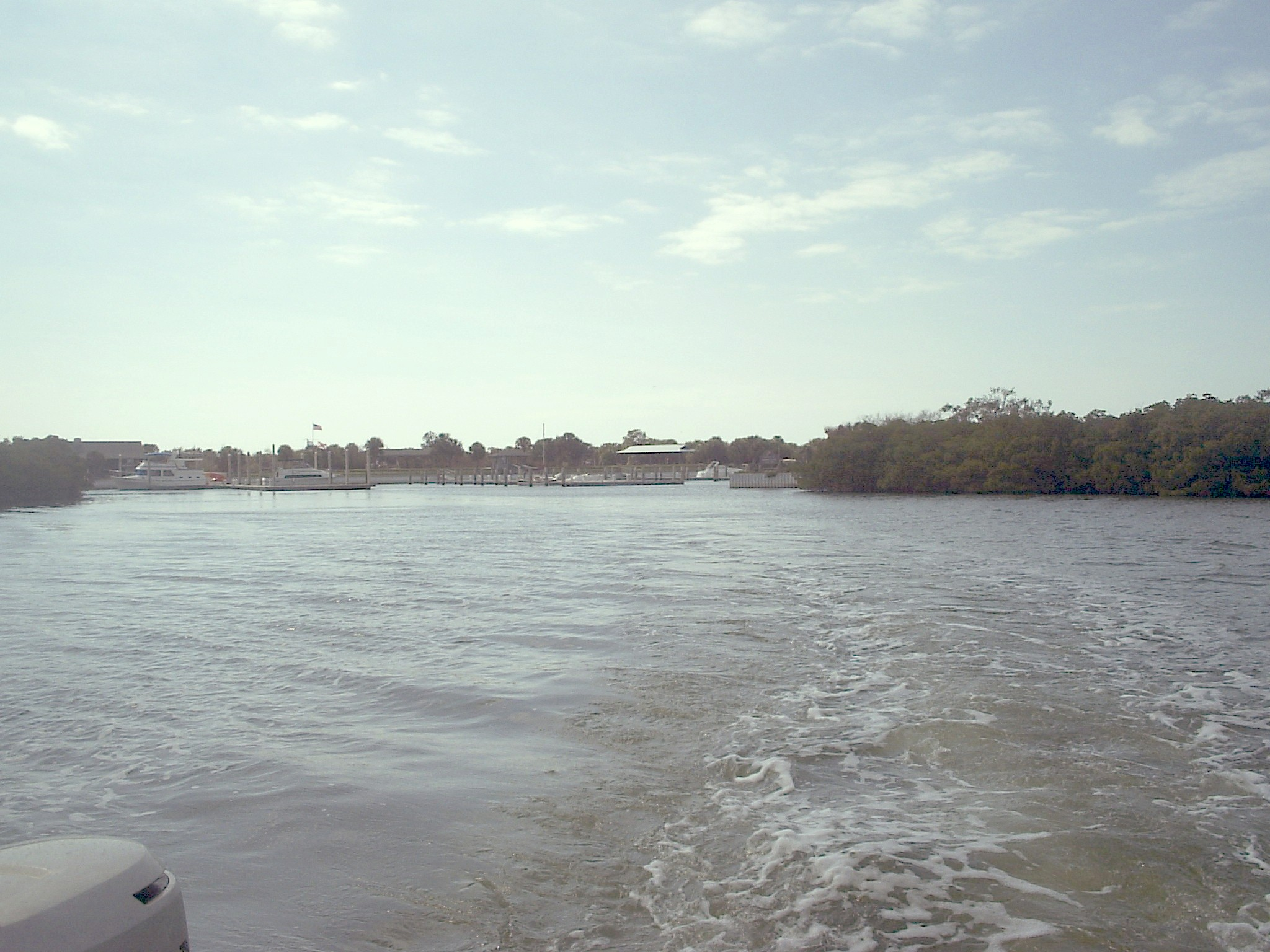
Caladesi Park's boat marina, in the distance; the low shoreline trees are mangroves.

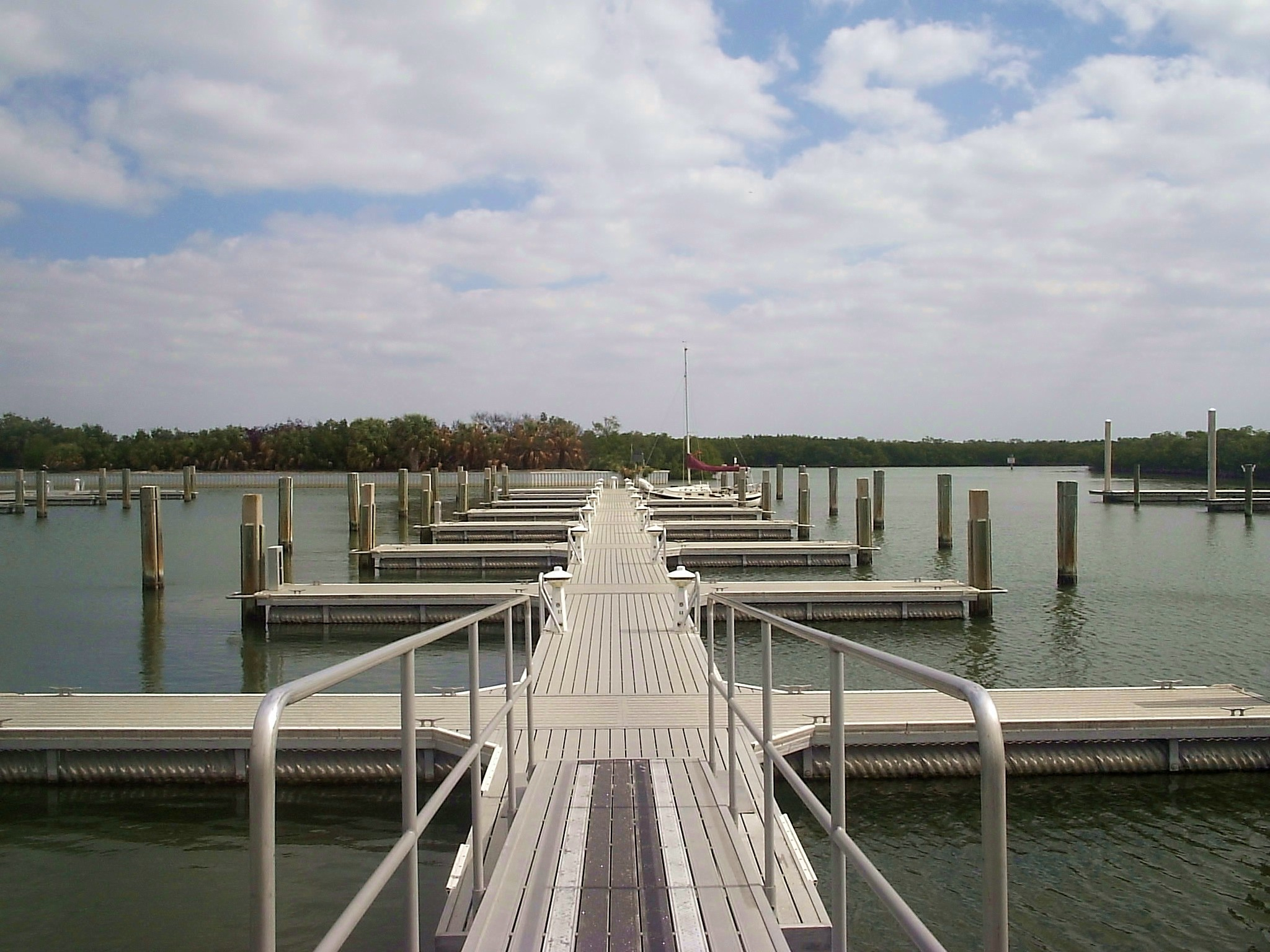
Marina up close

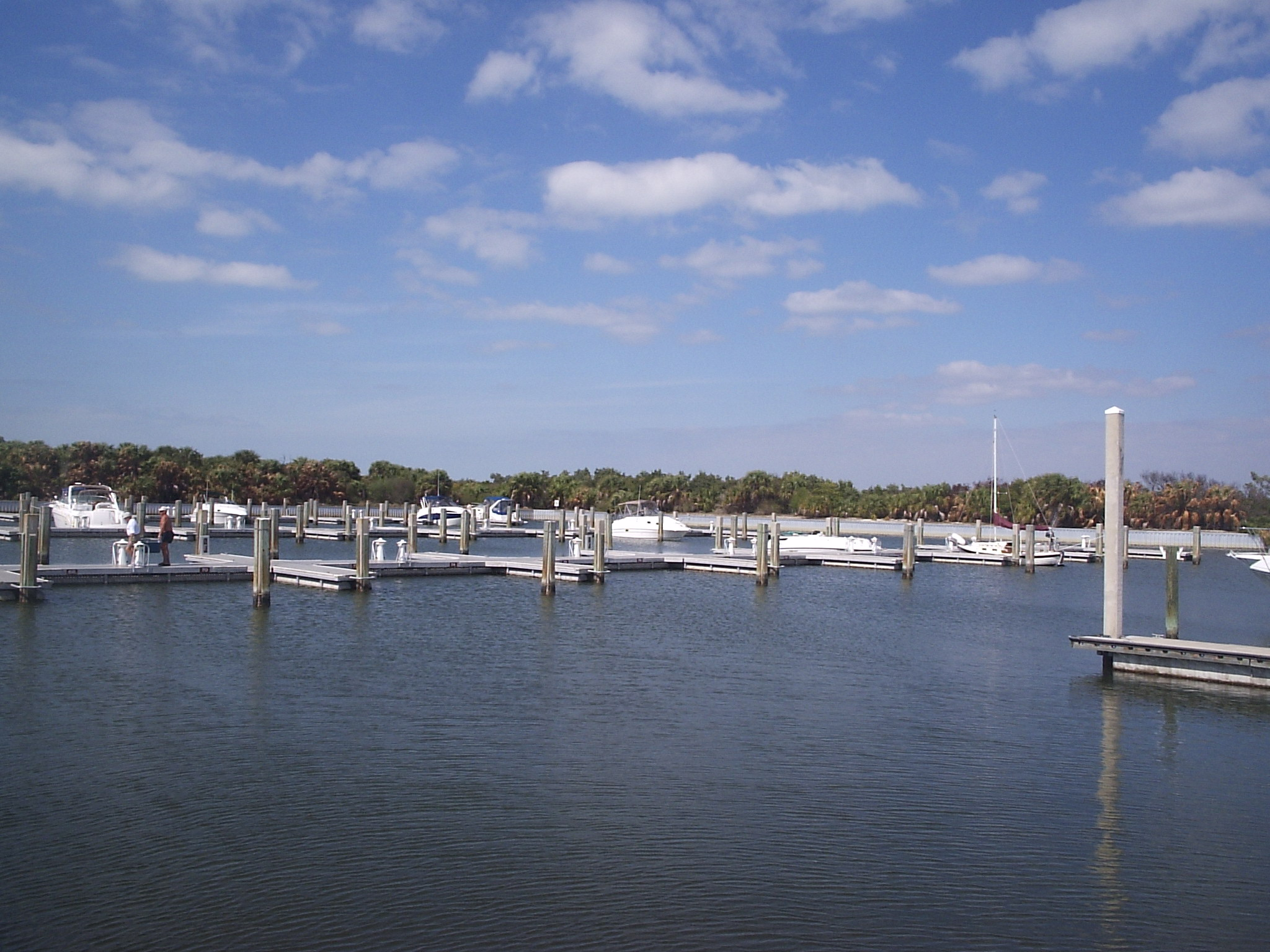
Marina, another view

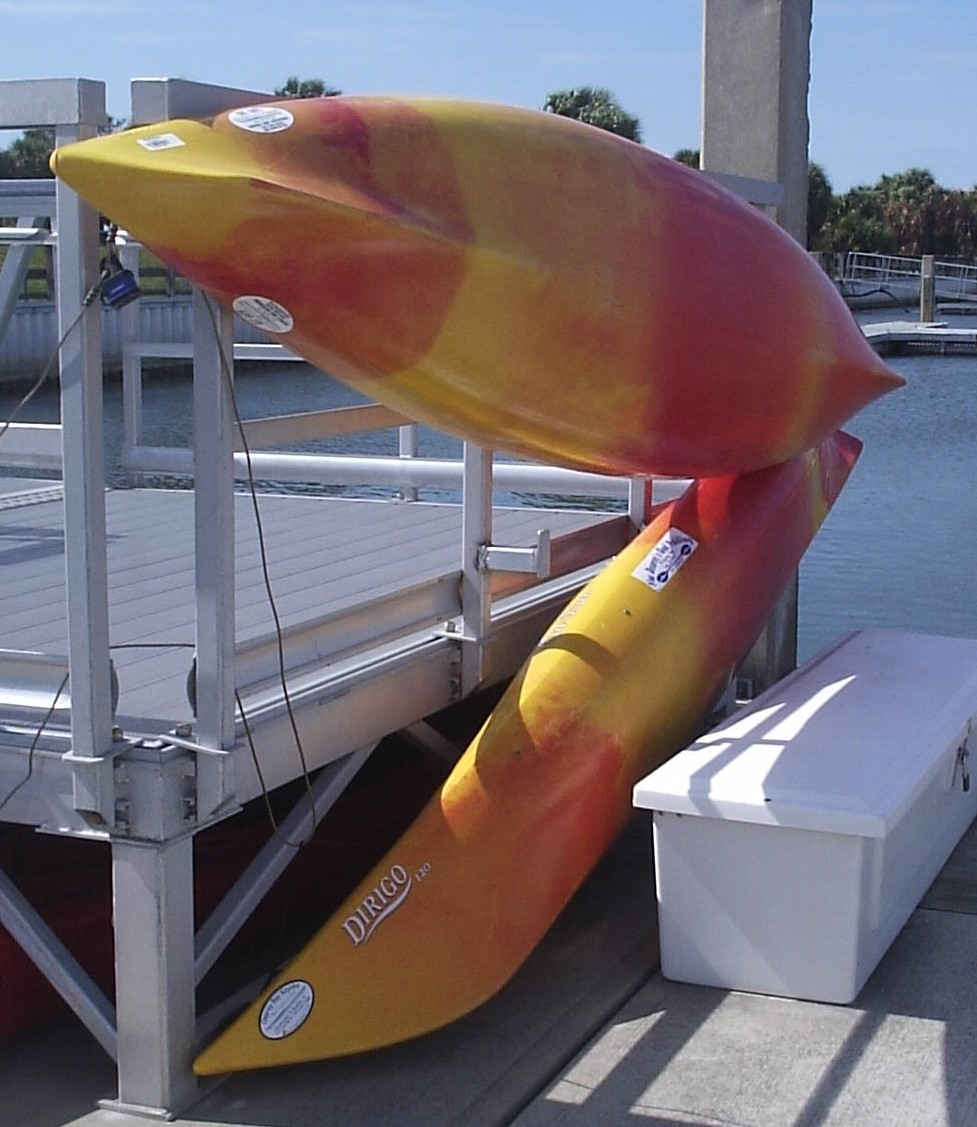
Kayaks near the concession stand, at the marina
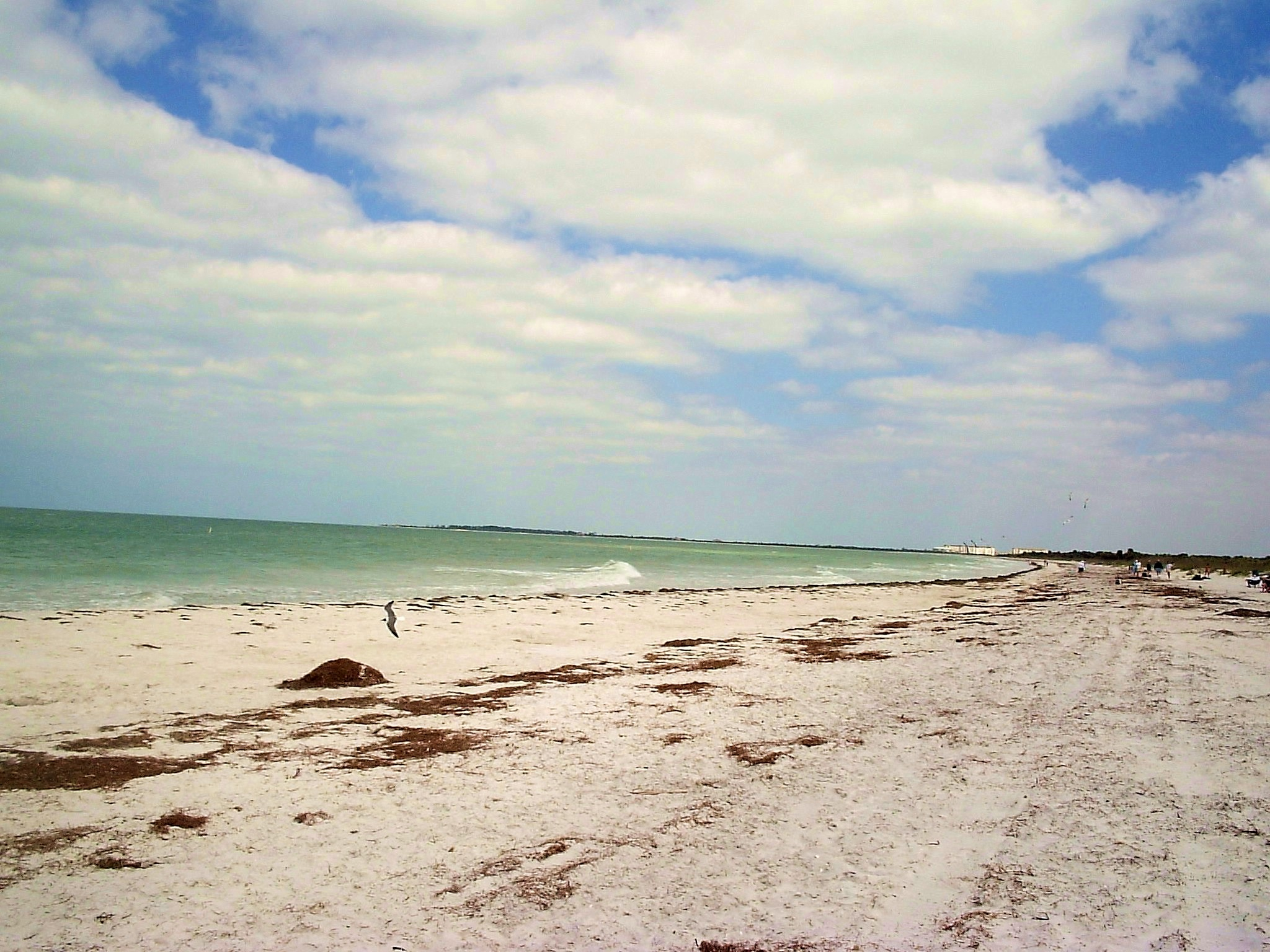
Caladesi Park's beach on the Gulf of Mexico, strewn with seaweed

Beach wedding

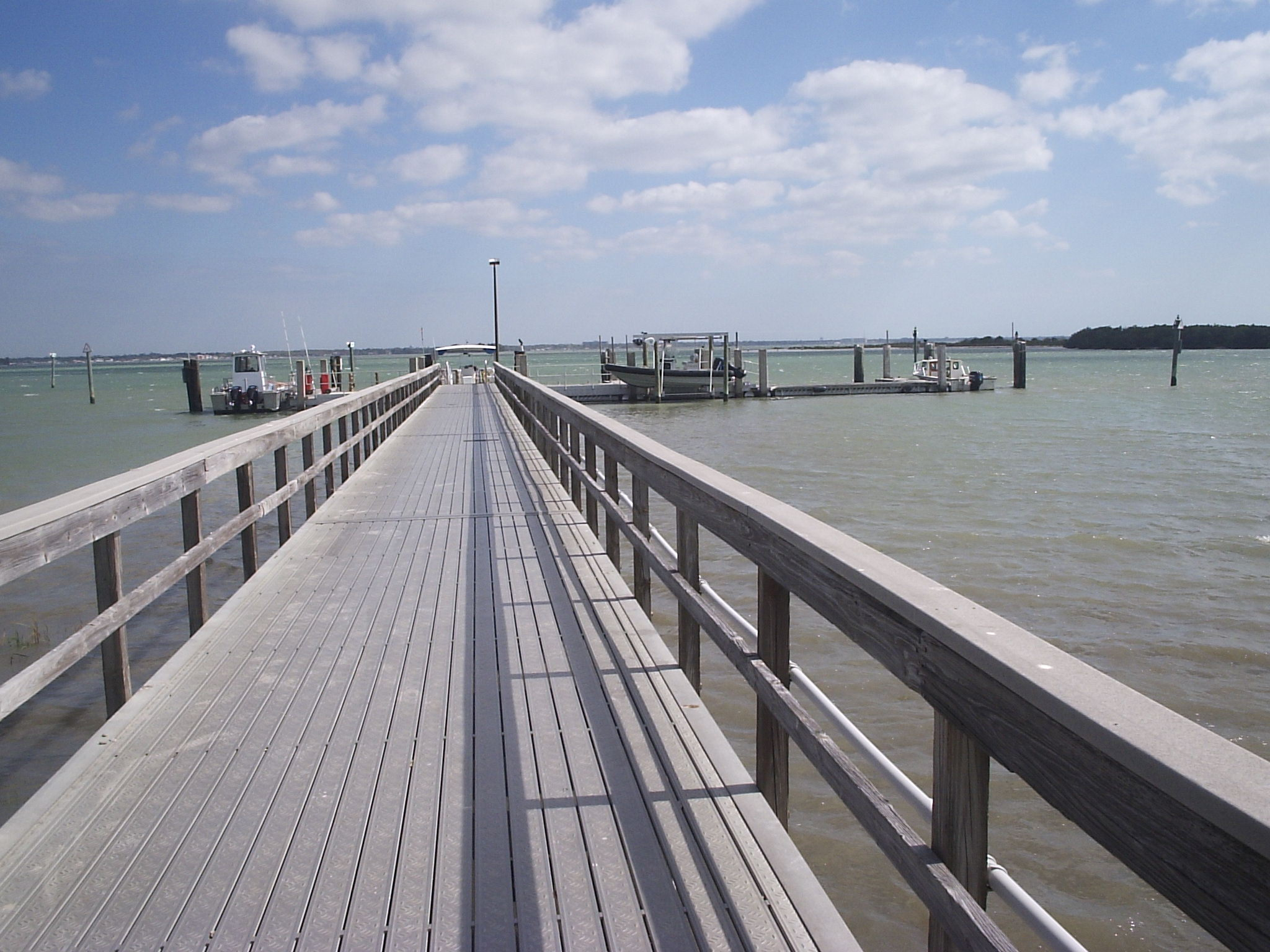
Park's small passenger ferry, docked

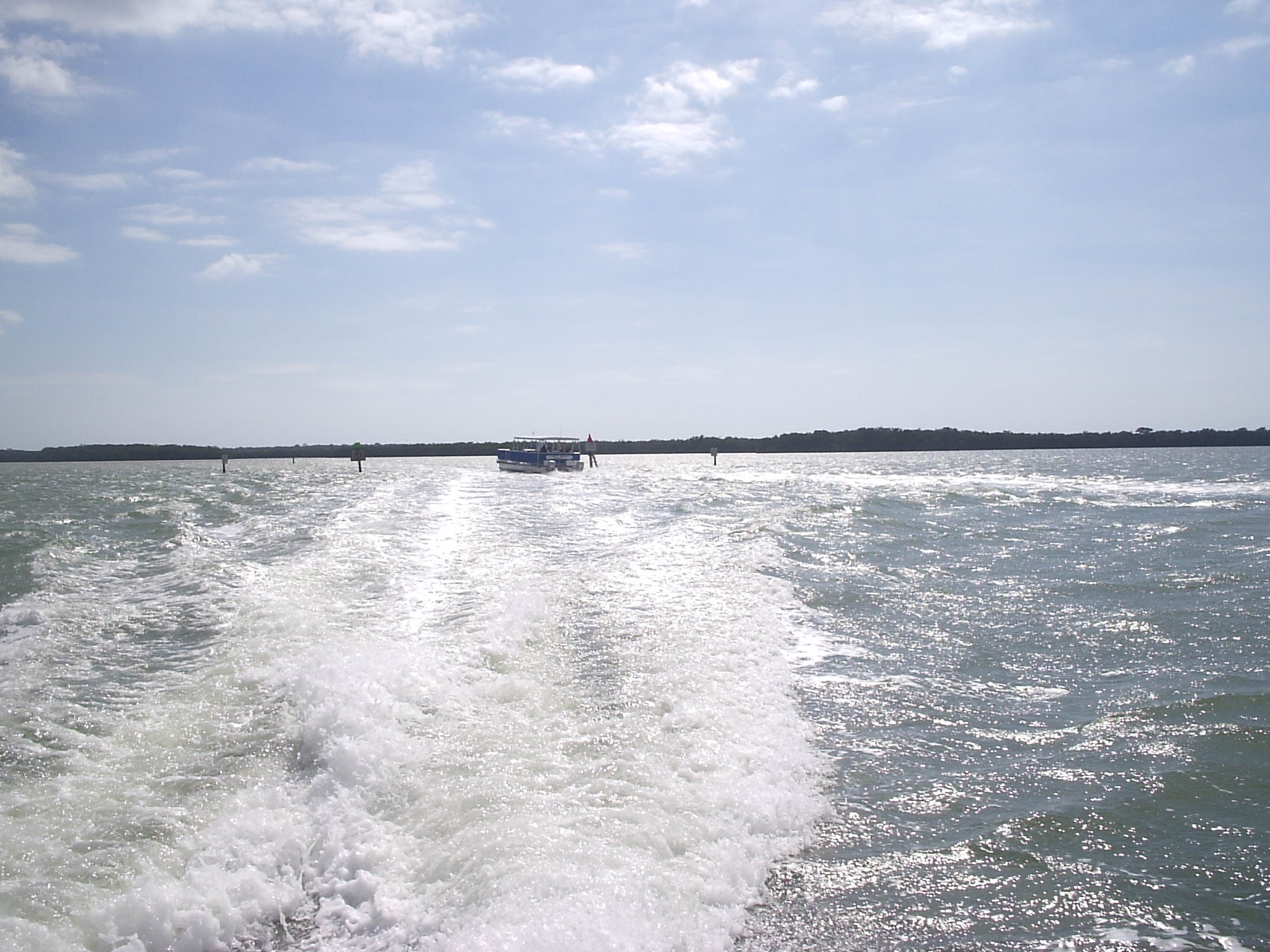
Passenger ferry boat, in motion

== Sources ==
- Betz, Myrtle Scharrer (2009) [1984]. Yesteryear I Lived in Paradise: the Story of Caladesi Island. Tampa, Florida: University of Tampa Press. ISBN 978-159732033-7.
