= Myrtle Scharrer Betz =

American author (1895–1992)

- Born: Myrtle Catherine Scharrer; February 22, 1895; Caladesi Island, Pinellas County, Florida, United States
- Died: January 3, 1992 (aged 96); Largo, Pinellas County, Florida, United States
- Other names: Myrtle Betz; Mrs. Herman Betz
- Occupations: Author; fisherwoman; conservationist
- Known for: Homesteading Caladesi Island and conservation advocacy
- Spouse: Herman Betz (m. 1915; died 1970)
- Children: 1
- Parents: Henry Scharrer (father); Catherine "Kate" McNally (mother)

Myrtle Catherine Scharrer Betz (February 22, 1895 – January 3, 1992) was an American author and conservationist who wrote about life on Caladesi Island in the early 20th century. Betz is known for being the only person of European descent born on Caladesi Island, and for rowing across the St. Joseph Sound daily to attend school in Dunedin as a child. In her later life, Betz was influential in Caladesi Island becoming a state park.

== Early life ==
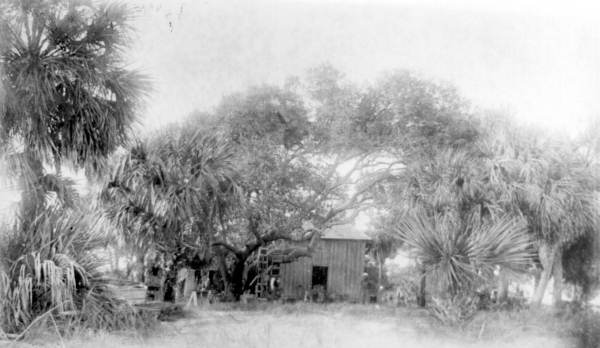
Scharrer family home on Hog Island.

Myrtle Scharrer was born on February 22, 1895, on Caladesi Island, then known as Hog Island, to Henry Scharrer, a Swiss immigrant who first homesteaded on the island in the late 1880s, and Catherine "Kate" McNally, an Irish immigrant who worked as a domestic worker for a local family in Dunedin. Her mother died in 1902, when Scharrer was seven years old.

During her stay on the island, Scharrer and her father made a living fishing. Her father also grew crops and kept bees on the island, while teaching Scharrer to hunt and fish. By eight years old, Scharrer attended regular schooling on the mainland, maintaining nearly perfect attendance for four years; she later recalled rowing back and forth across St. Joseph Sound. While her father sold fresh produce, fish, honey, and hogs, Scharrer—a self-described "tomboy"—earned money as a fur trapper. She aided her schooling with her father's trove of "scientific" works from Bern, Switzerland.

In 1915, at the age of 20, she married Herman Betz; they lived three years together in Miami before moving to St. Petersburg in 1918. The Betz family returned to Caladesi in 1919, and in 1928 they had one daughter. In June 1934, six months before Henry Scharrer's death, Betz and her husband moved to the mainland so their daughter could attend school in Dunedin.

Betz was on Hog Island when the 1921 Tampa Bay hurricane hit. The hurricane split the island in half, creating Honeymoon Island to the north and Caladesi Island to the south. Betz was among the first to view the new channel dividing the islands, Hurricane Pass. The Scharrer homestead reportedly sustained no permanent damage.

Betz, a lifelong member of the National Audubon Society, was an active bird bander for the Bureau of Biological Survey from 1919 to 1934. In 1932, she published an article in The Auk on burrowing owls on the island. Betz went on several excursions with naturalist W. S. Blatchley, who was a winter resident of Dunedin. She is cited in his 1932 book In Days Agone as a "close observer of bird life."

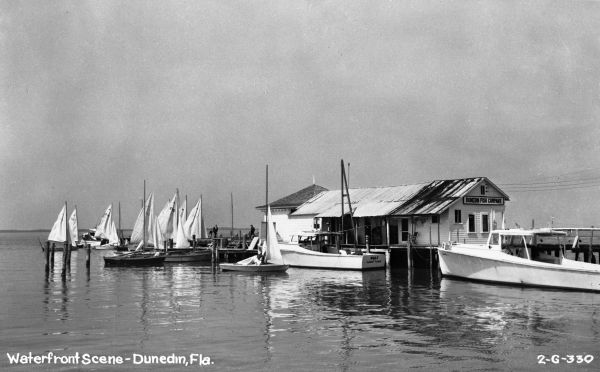
The Dunedin Fish Company at the Dunedin Marina where Betz worked in the 1940s.

During World War II, Betz was employed by the Dunedin Fish Company. From 1944 to 1946, she wrote anonymously in a weekly column in the Dunedin Times called "Pinch-Hitting for the Old Salt," the name referring to a baseball term for a substitute batter. The column often featured recipes and news around the Dunedin Marina.

From 1946 to 1954, the Betz family spent summers at an orchard they owned in Bent, New Mexico.

== Later life ==
Betz lived most of her later life in Palm Harbor, retiring there in 1954. Per her father's wishes, Betz sought for years to turn the Scharrer property on Caladesi into a wildlife refuge, unsuccessfully enlisting state support; prior to the 1960s her efforts were not viewed with favor. Having been sold to Dunedin City Commissioner Francis L. Skinner in 1946, the 156-acre Scharrer homestead was, along with other properties on the island, purchased by the state and made a state park in 1967, though the original houses and cabins on site burned down in the 1950s. Betz served on an advisory council on matters relating to Caladesi from 1967 to 1971.

At age 87, Betz wrote the book, Yesteryear I Lived in Paradise, telling of her life on the barrier island. Yesteryear I Lived In Paradise was first published in 1985 in a loose-leaf binding made possible by the interest and generosity of 105 friends of Myrtle Betz. This edition was presented to Myrtle as a surprise gift for her 90th birthday, with the foreword written by Vivien Skinner Grant, a niece of the aforementioned Francis L. Skinner and former Dunedin City Commissioner herself. In 1990, Honeymoon Island State Park celebrated Myrtle Scharrer Betz Day on the island.

== Death and legacy ==
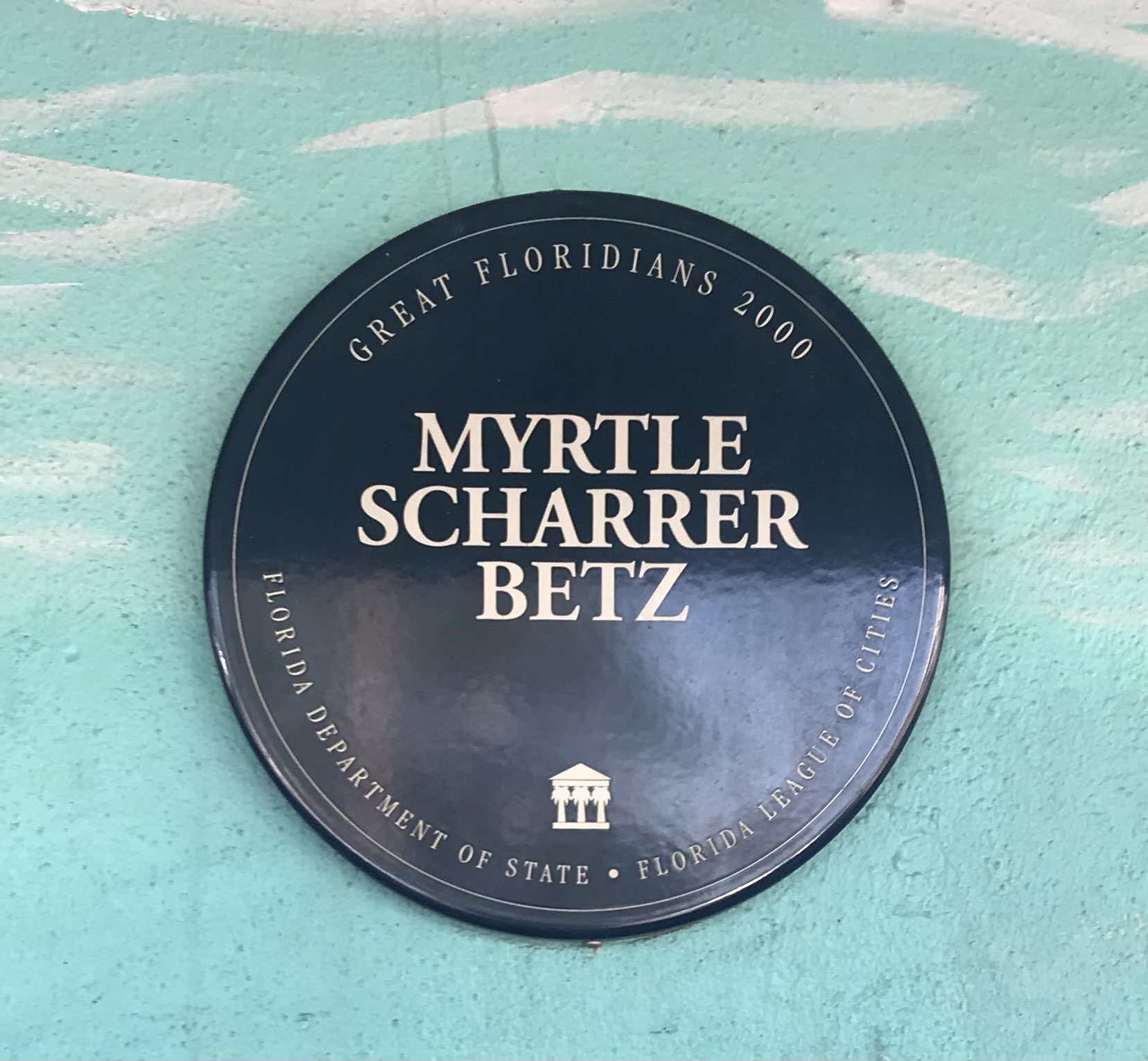
Betz's Great Floridians 2000 plaque at the Dunedin Marina.

Betz died in 1992 at Sun Coast Hospital after suffering from a stroke. Her ashes were later scattered at Caladesi Island State Park by her family.

In 1994, a play based on her book about Caladesi Island, The Islander, was presented at the cultural center in Tarpon Springs, Florida. Betz's descendants have also presented about her life in period costumes to people interested in life on the island.

In 2000, she was honored as a Great Floridian, one of two honorees from Dunedin (the other being orange juice magnate Bronson Cushing Skinner, who was the brother of Francis L. Skinner). Betz's plaque is located at the Dunedin Marina, the location where she worked for the Dunedin Fish Company.

Yesteryear I Lived in Paradise was reprinted in 1991, 2009, and 2023. The 2009 edition was awarded the Florida Trust for Historic Preservation award, and its cover features Caladesi Sunset, a painting by Tarpon Springs artist Christopher M. Still. In 2012, Betz's granddaughters Terry Fortner and Suzanne Thorp published Caladesi Cookbook: Recipes from a Florida Lifetime, 1895-1992, a book of Betz's recipes alongside notes providing context about her and her family's lives and rememberings, with an introduction written by University of South Florida history professor Gary R. Mormino.

In 2008, Betz was profiled in Linda Taylor's book on Florida women exploring nature, and in 2016, her life story was featured in an exhibit, "Our Women, Our Places," at the Palm Harbor Museum, which also held another reading of the play The Islander. Later, she was designated by the Clearwater Historical Society as one of its 2025 Trailblazing Women, an annual exhibit during Women's History Month that honors notable women from the Pinellas County area.
