= East Lake, Pinellas County, Florida =

East Lake, Florida
- Census-designated place
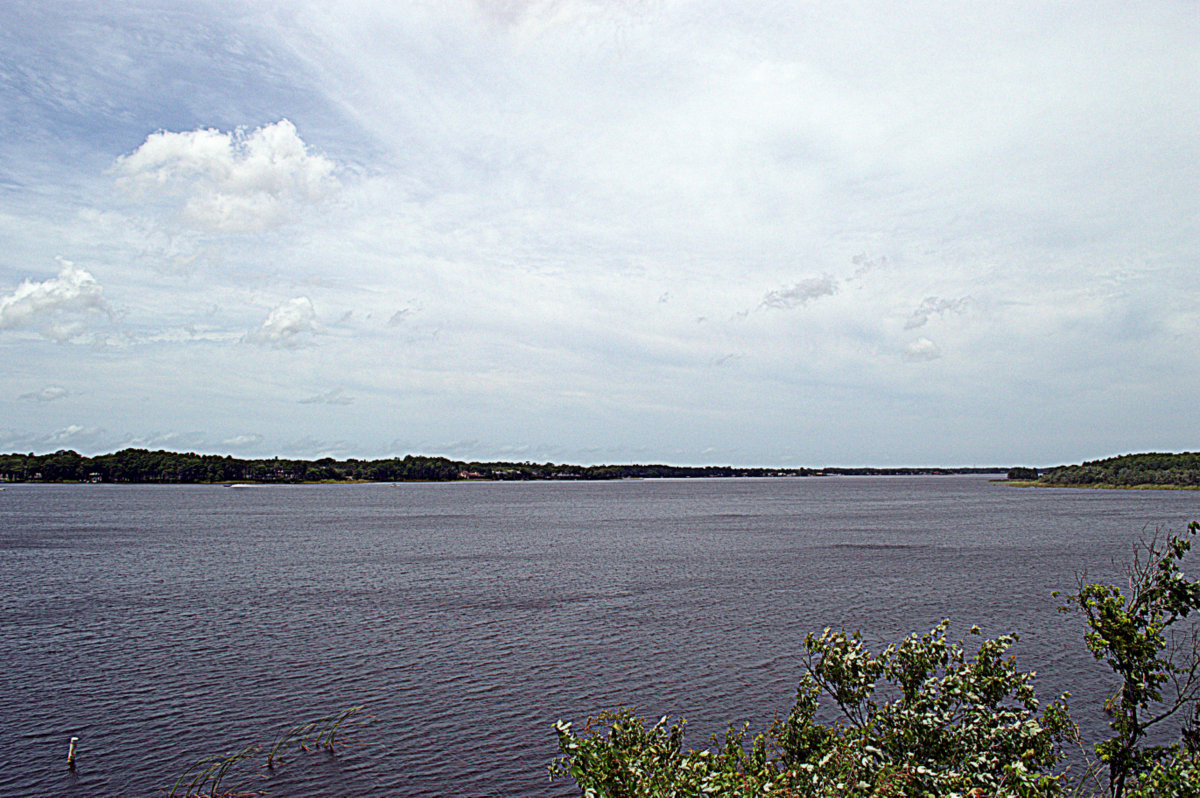
- Lake Tarpon from John Chestnut Park in East Lake.

- Location in Pinellas County and the state of Florida
- Coordinates: 28°08′15″N 82°41′13″W
- Country: United States
- State: Florida
- Counties: Pinellas

Area
  - Total: 31.6 sq mi (81.8 km^{2})
  - Land: 28.9 sq mi (74.9 km^{2})
  - Water: 2.7 sq mi (7.0 km^{2})
- Elevation: 10 ft (3.0 m)

Population (2020)
  - Total: 32,344
  - Density: 1,120/sq mi (432/km^{2})
- Time zone: UTC-5 (Eastern (EST))
  - Summer (DST): UTC-4 (EDT)
- GNIS feature ID: 2402430

East Lake is a census-designated place (CDP) in Pinellas County, Florida, United States. It was one of the last areas in the densely populated county to develop and often confused with East Lake in neighboring Hillsborough County. The population was 32,344 at the 2020 census.

== Geography ==
East Lake is located just north of Oldsmar and east of Palm Harbor and Tarpon Springs.

According to the United States Census Bureau, the CDP has a total area of 31.6 square miles (81.8 km^{2}), of which 28.9 square miles (74.9 km^{2}) is land and 2.7 square miles (7.0 km^{2}) (8.50%) is water.

The closest beach is Honeymoon Island State Park. The closest county park is John Chesnut Sr. County Park, which covers approximately 255 acres (1.03 km^{2}) off the east shore Lake Tarpon.

== Demographics ==
Historical population
Census	Pop.	Note	%±
2000	29,394		—
2010	30,962		5.3%
2020	32,344		4.5%
U.S. Decennial Census

=== 2010 and 2020 census ===
East Lake racial composition (Hispanics excluded from racial categories) (NH = Non-Hispanic)
Race	Pop 2010	Pop 2020	% 2010	% 2020
White (NH)	27,107	26,398	87.55%	81.62%
Black or African American (NH)	455	619	1.47%	1.91%
Native American or Alaska Native (NH)	37	45	0.12%	0.14%
Asian (NH)	1,058	1,295	3.42%	4.00%
Pacific Islander or Native Hawaiian (NH)	6	12	0.02%	0.04%
Some other race (NH)	30	109	0.10%	0.34%
Two or more races/Multiracial (NH)	427	1,182	1.38%	3.65%
Hispanic or Latino (any race)	1,842	2,684	5.95%	8.30%
Total	30,962	32,344		

As of the 2020 United States census, there were 32,344 people, 13,495 households, and 9,158 families residing in the CDP.

As of the 2010 United States census, there were 30,962 people, 13,195 households, and 8,654 families residing in the CDP.

=== 2000 census ===
As of the census of 2000, there were 29,394 people, 11,854 households, and 8,914 families residing in the CDP. The population density was 381.1 people/km^{2} (987 people/mi^{2}). There were 13,339 housing units at an average density of 172.9 units/km^{2} (448 units/mi^{2}). The racial makeup of the CDP was 94.87% White, 1.11% African American, 0.14% Native American, 2.31% Asian, 0.01% Pacific Islander, 0.58% from other races, and 0.98% from two or more races. Hispanic or Latino of any race were 3.72% of the population.

As of 2000, there were 11,854 households, out of which 31.8% had children under the age of 18 living with them, 67.1% were married couples living together, 6.2% had a female householder with no husband present, and 24.8% were non-families. 20.8% of all households were made up of individuals, and 8.2% had someone living alone who was 65 years of age or older. The average household size was 2.48 and the average family size was 2.88.

In 2000, in the CDP, the population was spread out, with 23.8% under the age of 18, 4.3% from 18 to 24, 26.2% from 25 to 44, 27.8% from 45 to 64, and 17.9% who were 65 years of age or older. The median age was 43 years. For every 100 females there were 94.7 males. For every 100 females age 18 and over, there were 90.4 males.

In 2000, the median income for a household in the CDP was $67,546, and the median income for a family was $79,029. Males had a median income of $61,625 versus $32,289 for females. The per capita income for the CDP was $36,206. About 3.1% of families and 3.9% of the population were below the poverty line, including 4.5% of those under age 18 and 3.9% of those age 65 or over.

== Communities and neighborhoods ==
- Anchorage
- Bridlewood
- Coventry Village
- Cypress Run
- Deer Hollow
- Eagle Cove
- East Lake Woodlands (ELW)
  - Aberdeen
  - Creekside
  - Cross Pointe
  - Deerpath
  - Diamond Crest
  - Enclave
  - Hunter's Trail
  - Isleworth
  - Kingsmill
  - Quail Forest
  - Turtle Creek
  - Warwick Hills
  - Woods Landing
  - Worthington
- El Pasado
- Glenridge East
- Hawk's Landing
- Lake Tarpon Villages
  - The Clearing
  - Windmill Pointe of Tarpon Lake
- Lansbrook
  - Berisford
  - Carlyle
  - Ellinwood
  - Fallsbrook
  - Golfside
  - Ivy Ridge
  - Juniper Bay
  - Kylemont
  - Lynnwood
  - Myrtle Point
- Oak Hill Acres
- Presidents Landing
- Ridgemoor
  - Briarwick
  - Farrell Park
  - Foxberry Run
  - Westcott Square
  - Westwind
  - Windemere
- Tarpon Woods
- The Wilds
- Westmonte Estates
- Whispering Lakes
- Woodfield
  - Fieldstone Village
  - Lakeshore Village
  - Oaklake Village
  - Shadowlake Village

== Schools ==
East Lake High School has managed to rate equivalently with Palm Harbor's University High School (both A+ rated), despite not having the attraction of an International Baccalaureate program like Palm Harbor University High. Additionally, East Lake is home to an engineering magnet middle school (East Lake Middle School) and two large elementary schools (Brooker Creek Elementary and Cypress Woods Elementary).

== Public Library ==
The East Lake Community Library is the public library that services the East Lake and greater Pinellas County area. It is a member of the Pinellas Public Library Cooperative. The library itself is a result of community initiative which resulted in the ELCL opening a physical building November 1, 1999.

In 2013 the ELCL "became an independent library with its own taxing district, thereby providing a new revenue stream for operational expenses and enhancements to the building. This also resulted in an increase in hours, staffing, programs, services, and collections."

The library's outdoor space is designated as a Florida Butterfly Garden. As of January 2015, the library has established a special collection area for local, self-published authors to submit their works for circulation and display.

In 2016, then Governor Rick Scott passed the Florida State Budget granting the ELCL a $1,000,000 in funding for expansion of the library. On November 20, 2017, the library broke ground on the phase 1 of the expansion which aimed to expand the library by 2,600 square feet.
