= Beach sunflower =

Beach sunflower may refer to the following plant species:

- Helianthus debilis, native to the United States
- Wollastonia biflora
