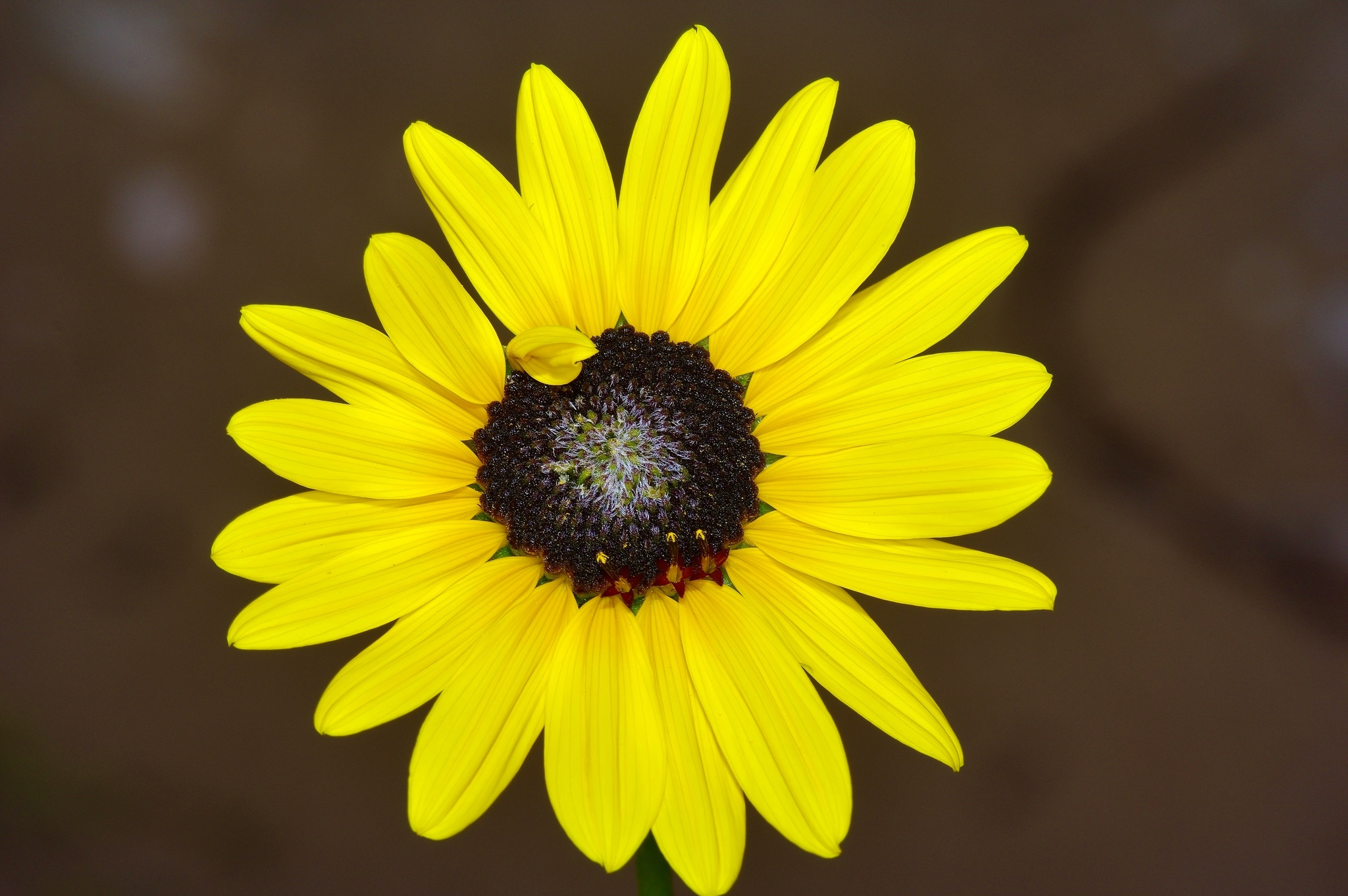

Conservation status
- Data Deficient (IUCN 3.1)

Scientific classification
- Kingdom: Plantae
- Clade: Tracheophytes
- Clade: Angiosperms
- Clade: Eudicots
- Clade: Asterids
- Order: Asterales
- Family: Asteraceae
- Genus: Helianthus
- Species: H. neglectus

Binomial name
- Helianthus neglectus Heiser 1958 not Otto ex A.Gray 1884

= Helianthus neglectus =

Species of sunflower

Helianthus neglectus is a species of sunflower known by the common names neglected sunflower. It is native to the southwestern United States in southeastern New Mexico and West Texas.

Helianthus neglectus grows on sand dunes and other sandy soil. This wildflower is an annual herb up to 200 cm (almost 7 ft) tall, growing from a thick, fleshy taproot. One plant produces one to five flower heads containing 21-31 yellow ray florets surrounding 150 or more red or purple disc florets.

Helianthus neglectus hybridizes with several other species in the region: H. annuus, H. debilis, and H. petiolaris.
