= Caladesi Island =

Island in Florida, United States

Coordinates: 28°01′46″N 82°49′14″W

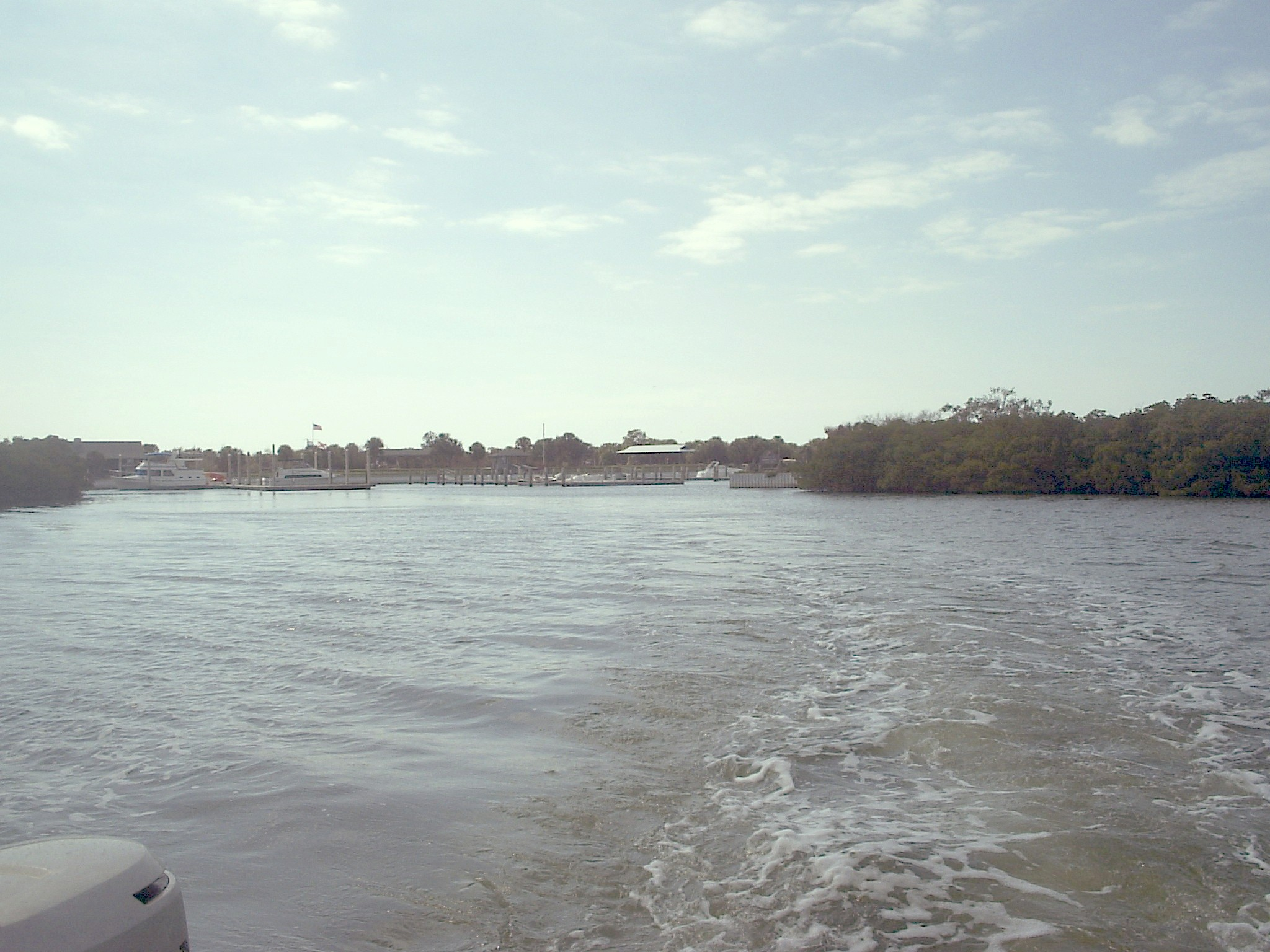
Marina on Caladesi Island

Caladesi Island is an uninhabited barrier island sited west of Dunedin in Pinellas County, Florida, United States, between Clearwater and Honeymoon islands, just north of Clearwater Beach. Located in the Tampa Bay area, it is bounded on the west by the Gulf of Mexico and on the east by St. Joseph Sound. Since 1967 it has belonged to Caladesi Island State Park. It is reachable only by foot from Clearwater Beach or by boat from Honeymoon Island State Park.

== History ==
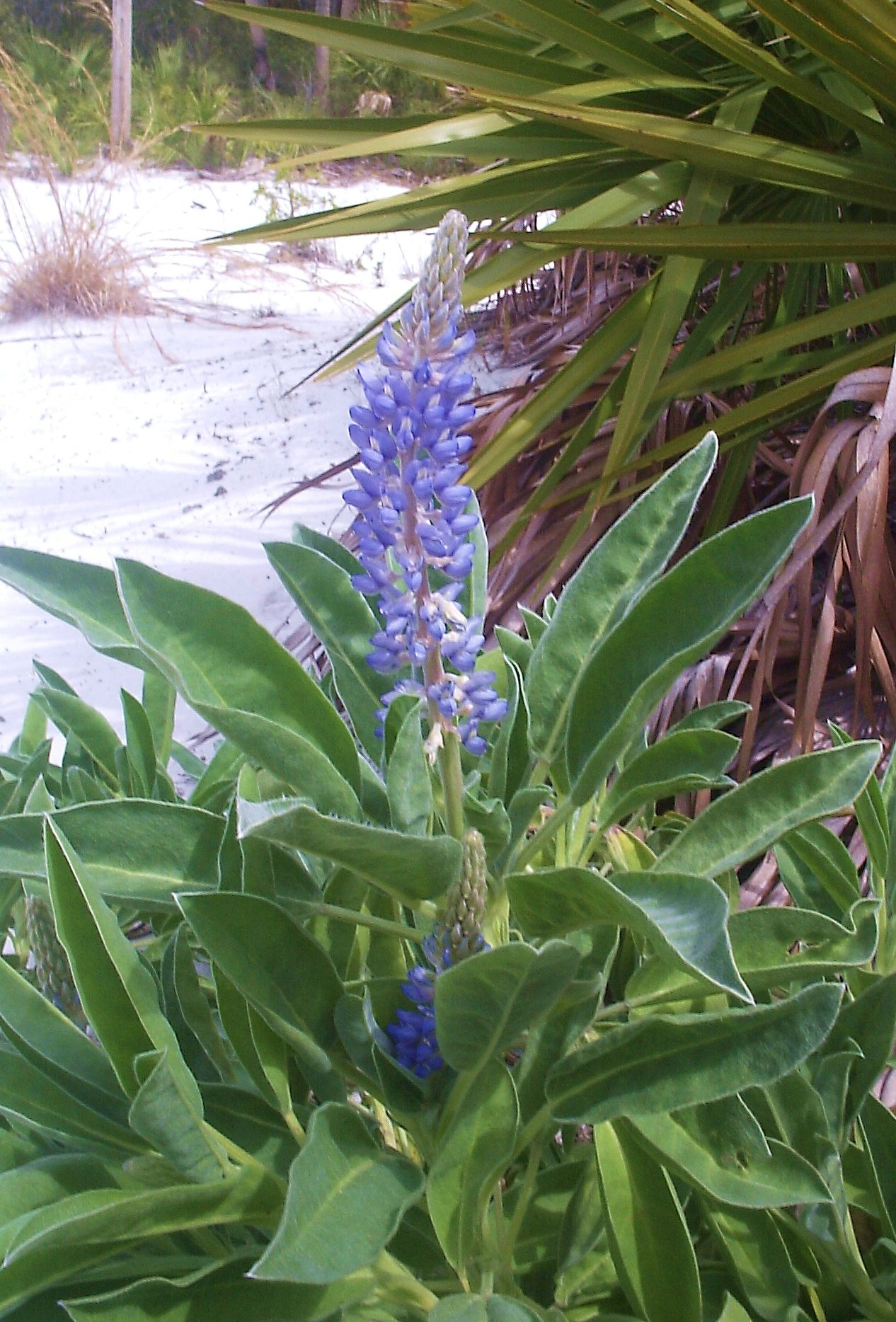
Wild lupine on Caladesi Island

The island was likely present and morphologically similar several thousand years BP. Before European arrival, the Tocobaga and their immediate precursors dwelled on or near the island, leaving tumuli. In 1521 Juan Ponce de León may have attempted to settle nearby, but the first known European explorer to set foot regionally was Pánfilo de Narváez in 1528. Sometime in the 1780s, a Spanish Cuban named "Desi" or "Caldees" began a fishing rancho on a bayou (Spanish: Cala) near the southern tip of the island, etymologically lending Caladesi its name. A hurricane in 1848 forced the operation to cease permanently. In 1851 a United States Coast Survey map commissioned by Alexander Dallas Bache dubbed the island Joseph's Key.

In the late 19th century settlers raised pigs on the island, earning Caladesi its moniker Hog Island. In 1903 archaeologist Clarence Bloomfield Moore uncovered a burial mound on Hog Island and disinterred human remains, including 33 skeletons and 19 skulls. Until the 1920s Hog Island was 6 mi (9.7 km) long. In 1921 a hurricane split Hog Island in two, forming Honeymoon Island to its north. In 1928 the United States Geological Survey officially renamed the island Caladesi. In the 1930s county officials began digging mosquito ditches on Caladesi and other barrier islands, using dynamite to deepen a freshwater pond on the former. A decade later the Intracoastal Waterway was dredged, leaving spoil islands in St. Joseph Sound. Until 1985 Big (Dunedin) Pass separated Caladesi from Clearwater Island, but from 1959 on the Dunedin Causeway and Hurricane Elena caused it to silt up, making Caladesi accessible by foot from Clearwater Beach. The island is known for its natural communities, wildlife, and beachfront. In 2008 it was ranked "America's best beach" by geoscientist Stephen Leatherman, known informally as Dr. Beach.

Longtime Caladesi resident and conservationist Myrtle Scharrer Betz was the only person of European origin to be born on the island, living there for 35 years. Betz' father Henry Scharrer homesteaded 156 acres (63 ha) on the island, inviting sightseers to tour landmarks such as his farm, the pond, a rookery, shell mounds, an eagle's nest, an oak dome, the Harp Tree (whose trunk branched into two), and a clump of palms nicknamed the "Seven Sisters". Scharrer regaled his guests with details about features of the natural world on the island, such as its native plants. Prominent visitors to the island included Robert Lincoln, Carl Sandburg, Fritz Kreisler, Clark Howell, and Eddie Rickenbacker. Journalist Robert H. Davis visited the island in 1930, authoring a four-part piece on Scharrer and his daughter for the New York Sun.

== Sources ==
- Betz, Myrtle Scharrer (2009) [1984]. Yesteryear I Lived in Paradise: the Story of Caladesi Island. Tampa, Florida: University of Tampa Press. ISBN 978-159732033-7.
- MacDougald, James E. (2018). The Pánfilo de Narváez Expedition of 1528 (1st ed.). St. Petersburg, Florida: Marsden House. ISBN 978-1-4834-8672-7.
  - — (2021). The Maps that Change Florida's History: Revisiting the Ponce de León and Narváez Settlement Expeditions. St. Petersburg, Florida: Marsden House. ISBN 978-1-7350790-2-8.
