= Old Tarpon Springs City Hall =

- U.S. National Register of Historic Places
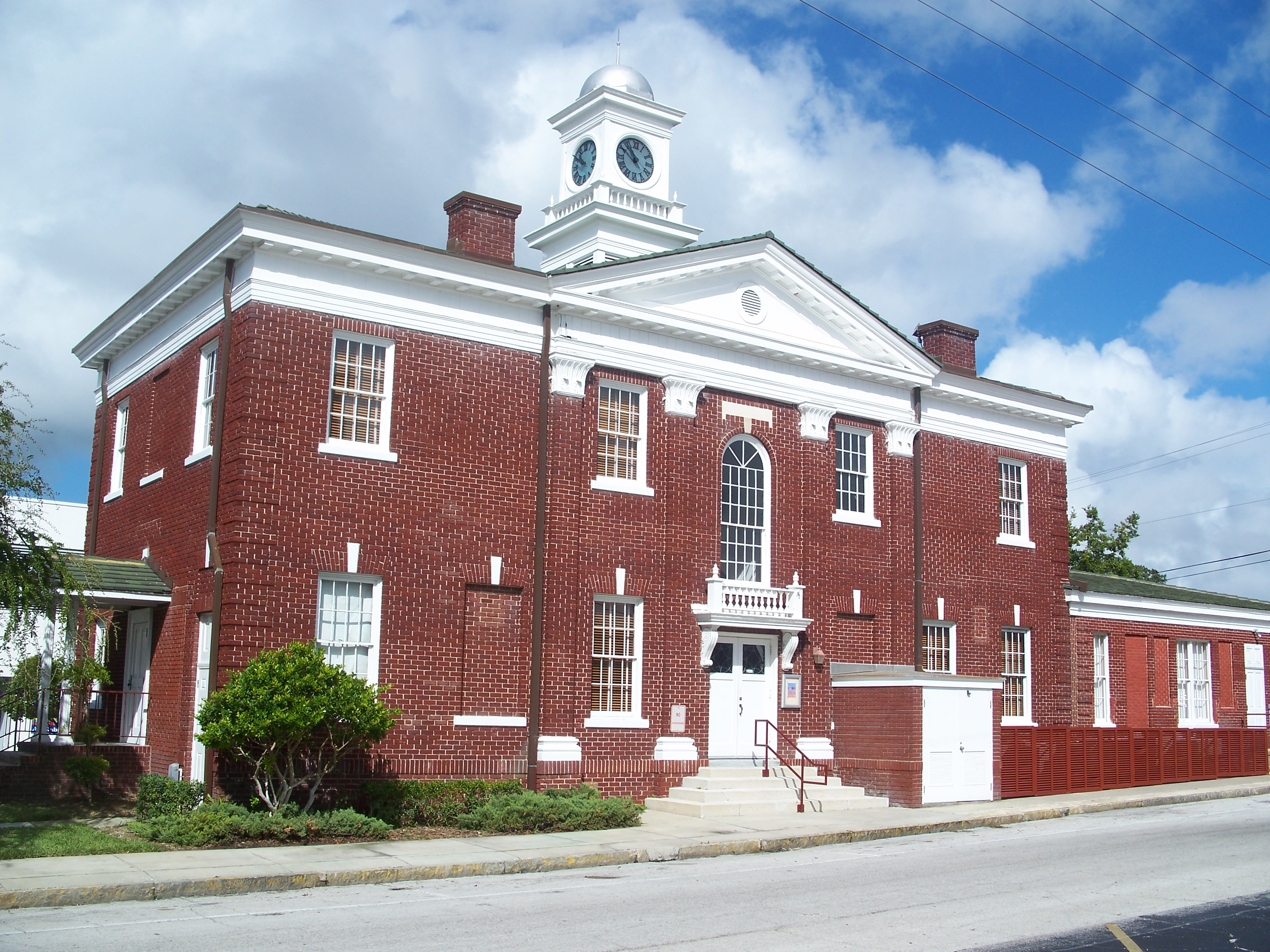

- Location within Florida Location within the United States
- Location: Tarpon Springs, Florida
- Coordinates: 28°8′42″N 82°45′24″W
- Architect: Ernest D. Ivey
- Architectural style: Classical Revival
- NRHP reference No.: 90001117
- Added to NRHP: August 10, 1990

Built in 1915, the Old Tarpon Springs City Hall is a historic site in Tarpon Springs, Florida. It is located at 101 South Pinellas Avenue. On August 10, 1990, it was added to the U.S. National Register of Historic Places. It was designed by renowned architect Ernest Ivey Cook in the neoclassical style.

== Tarpon Springs Cultural Center ==
The Tarpon Springs Cultural Center, located in the Old Tarpon Springs City Hall, features changing exhibits of art and sculpture.
