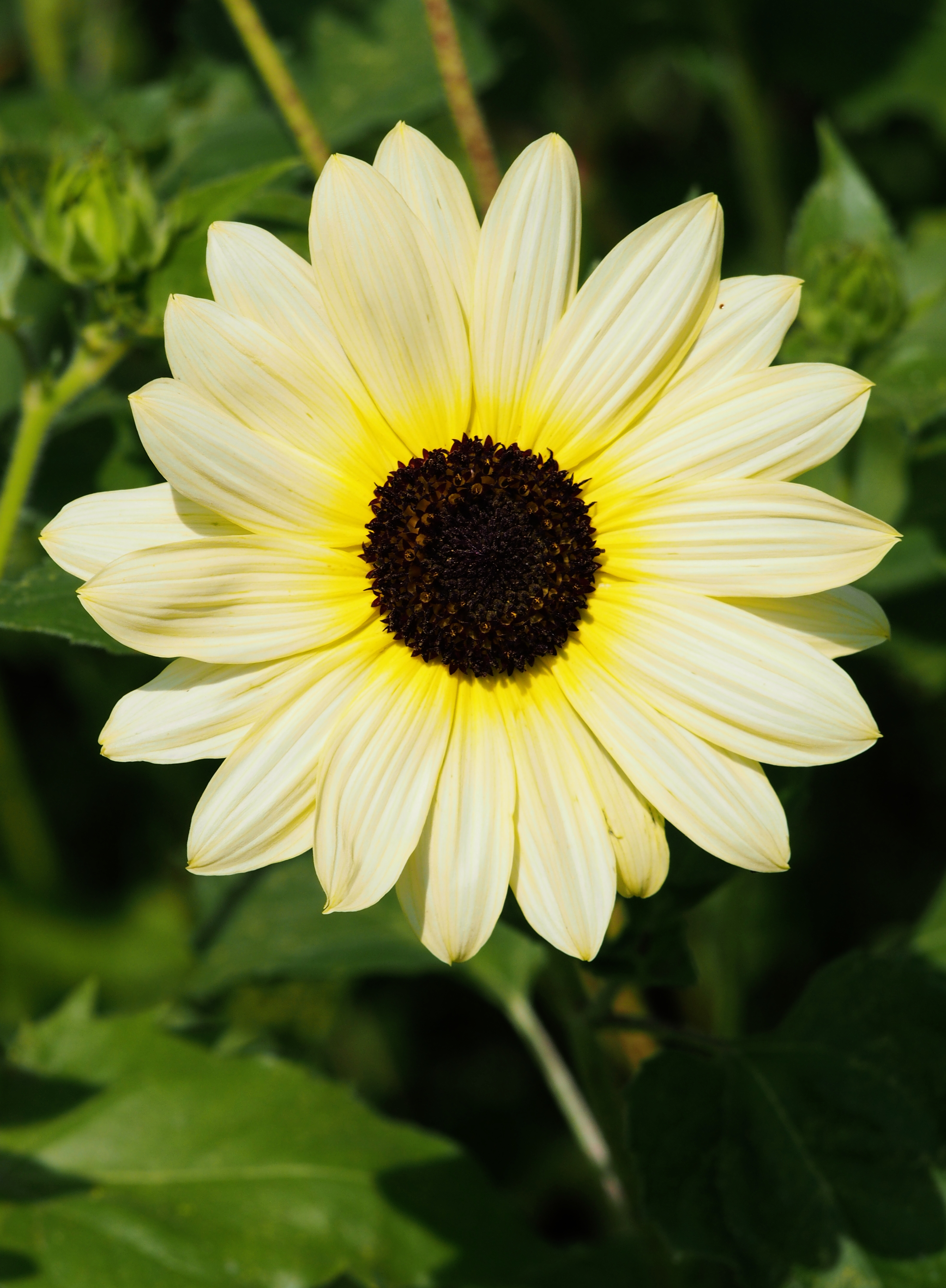

Scientific classification
- Kingdom: Plantae
- Clade: Tracheophytes
- Clade: Angiosperms
- Clade: Eudicots
- Clade: Asterids
- Order: Asterales
- Family: Asteraceae
- Genus: Helianthus
- Species: H. debilis
- Subspecies: H. d. subsp. cucumerifolius

Trinomial name
- Helianthus debilis subsp. cucumerifolius Torr. & A.Gray

= Helianthus debilis subsp. cucumerifolius =

Subspecies of sunflower

Helianthus debilis subsp. cucumerifolius, or cucumberleaf dune sunflower, is a subspecies of the species Helianthus debilis in the genus Helianthus, family Asteraceae. It is native to the South Central regions of the United States and exists naturalized in every continent except Antarctica.
