= Tarpon Springs Cultural Center =

Coordinates: 28.14531°N 82.75643°W

The Tarpon Springs Cultural Center includes the Center for Gulf Coast Folklife and is located in Tarpon Springs, Florida at 101 South Pinellas Avenue in Old Tarpon Springs City Hall.

== Center for Gulf Coast Folklife ==
The center celebrates folk artist traditions. Exhibitions include Latin American folk culture at the Gulf Coast Folklife Gallery, festivals (including Gulf Coast Folklife Festival; Gulf Coast Maritime and Music Festival; and Night in the Islands), performances, and a monthly Greek music and dance event. Workshops are also offered.

In 2012, Tarpon Springs received a $40,000 National Endowment for the Arts (NEA) grant to support the center.
