= Christopher M. Still =

American painter

Christopher M. Still (born 1961) is a painter of Florida's wildlife, people and landscapes. He has worked out of Dunedin, Florida, and has a gallery in Tarpon Springs, Florida. His career was honored in 2010 with induction into the Florida Artists Hall of Fame.

Still received a commission for ten large paintings covering the history of Florida for the Florida House of Representatives. That project is discussed in a section in Jeff Klinkenberg's book Seasons of Florida.

According to his website, Still is a Florida native, attended the Pennsylvania Academy of Fine Arts on a full scholarship won through a national competition, studied human anatomy at Jefferson Medical School and apprenticed in traditional techniques in Florence, Italy. The website also states he won a European Travel Fellowship and the Pennsylvania Governor's Award for outstanding accomplishment in Fine Art, before returning to Tampa Bay in 1986.
