= Lake Tarpon =

Lake in the state of Florida, United States

- Location within Florida Location within the United States
- Location: Pinellas County, Florida
- Coordinates: 28.12°N 82.73°W
- Catchment area: 52 sq mi (130 km^{2})
- Basin countries: United States
- Surface area: 2,500 acres (10 km^{2})

Lake Tarpon is a freshwater lake located about 10 miles (16 km) west of Tampa in Palm Harbor and Tarpon Springs, Florida. Lake Tarpon is the largest freshwater lake in Pinellas County with a surface area of 2,534 acres (10.25 km^{2}). Its watershed encompasses 52 square miles (130 km^{2}). Its two largest tributaries are South Creek and Brooker Creek. The lake is a regional recreational destination and is renowned for its largemouth bass fishing.

Although Lake Tarpon is designated as a fishing lake, it fails to meet the EPA's standards, and is therefore listed as an impaired lake due to its excessive nutrients and resulting low dissolved oxygen levels. The lake underwent increasing eutrophication during the 1990s, following a large algal bloom in 1987. Although initial studies determined that the lake was not polluted, studies in the following years noted a decline in the lake's water quality.
