= Honeymoon Island State Park =

State park in Florida, United States

- IUCN category V (protected landscape/seascape)
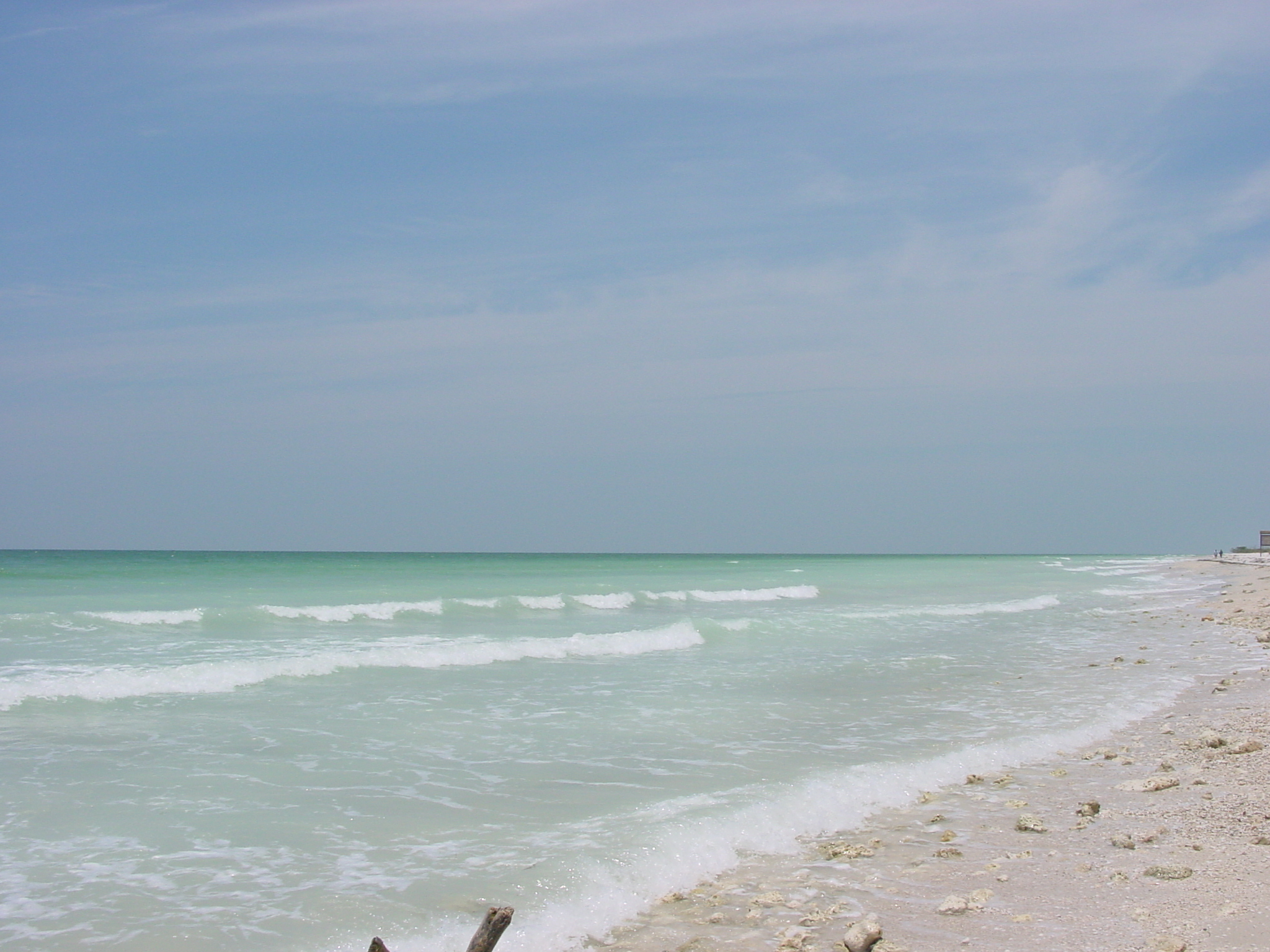
- Gulf of Mexico shoreline at Honeymoon Island

- Location within Florida Location within the United States
- Interactive map of Honeymoon Island State Park
- Location: Pinellas County, Florida, U.S.
- Nearest city: Dunedin
- Coordinates: 28°04′08″N 82°49′52″W
- Area: 2,824.52 acres (11.4304 km^{2})
- Established: December 7, 1981; 44 years ago
- Visitors: 1,528,178 (in 2022–23)
- Governing body: Florida Department of Environmental Protection, Division of Recreation and Parks

Honeymoon Island State Park is a 2,824.52-acre (1,143.04 ha) Florida state park protecting most of Honeymoon Island, a barrier island on Florida's Gulf coast in Pinellas County, west of Dunedin. The park protects approximately 4.25 miles (6.84 km) of shoreline along the Gulf of Mexico together with extensive seagrass beds, mangrove swamps, slash pine flatwoods, and coastal dunes and grasslands. The state began buying the land in 1974, and the park opened in December 1981.

The island is south of the Anclote Keys and north of Caladesi Island, being separated by a hurricane in 1921. The two islands originally formed a single island named Hog Island, with the inlet between them being known as Hurricane Pass. The park's landform includes a wind and wave shaped finger at its northern end that has grown outward by more than 160 ft (50 m) per year since the late 1970s.

Honeymoon Island supports a healthy gopher tortoise population, one of Florida's most concentrated osprey nesting colonies, and nesting loggerhead sea turtles. It is a wintering and stopover site of state and federal importance for migratory shorebirds, such as piping plover and red knot, and has been ranked among Florida's top sites for wintering shorebirds.

More than 1.5 million visitors were recorded in fiscal year 2022–23, making Honeymoon Island the most-visited traditional state park in Florida.

== History ==
=== Sand Island and Hog Island ===
"Sand Island" was first identified in the 1830s on United States coastal maps. By the middle of the nineteenth century, the island had been renamed Hog Island for a farm on the property, and this name stayed in use for nearly a century. In 1921 the Tampa Bay hurricane cut Hurricane Pass through the barrier, dividing Hog Island in two; the northern part became Honeymoon Island and the southern part Caladesi Island.

=== Honeymoon Village ===
In 1939 the New York advertising executive Clinton M. Washburn purchased the northern half of the former Hog Island for $25,000 and, aided by a friendship with a Life magazine editor, launched a national publicity campaign to reimagine the site as a honeymoon retreat. Washburn built roughly 50 palm-thatched cottages in a Polynesian style, together with a "king's palace" pavilion, a wedding chapel, a dance hall, a water tower, and a communal building. The resort opened to the public on March 8, 1940, when its first guests, Marjorie and Earnest Burkett, arrived.

Honeymoon village model from the Dunedin Historical Museum

The complex was promoted through a Life magazine feature on April 8, 1940, and a Paramount newsreel the same year, drawing more than 200 couples to a contest whose winners were awarded a two-week stay in the huts, with rowboat, gas stove, and no electricity or plumbing supplied. Notable applicants reportedly included the actors Ronald Reagan and Jane Wyman. A total of 164 couples were accommodated before the United States entered World War II in December 1941.

During the war, Washburn leased the property to an Ohio defense contractor as a rest facility for its war-industry workers, and the island was also used for amphibious vehicle testing. None of the resort structures survived the war; a concrete pad and two upright elements near the Osprey Center are the only visible remains that might date from the period.

=== Postwar and 1960s development ===
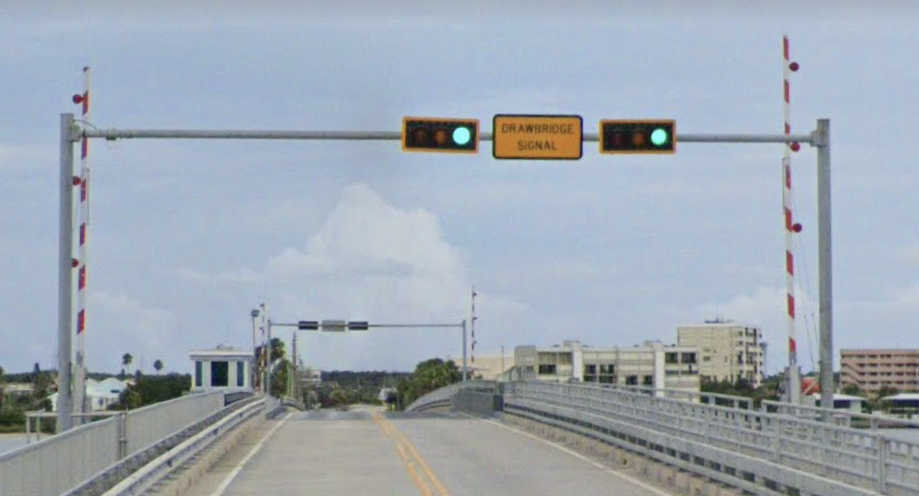
Dunedin Causeway

The industrialist Arthur Vining Davis acquired the island in 1956, and in 1958 title passed to Robert E. Lee on behalf of Curlew Properties, Inc. The Dunedin Causeway, connecting the mainland to the barrier, was completed in December 1964 to support a proposed development that would have enlarged the island from about 200 acres (81 ha) to 3,000 acres (1,200 ha) of dredged fill and constructed 4,500 residential units to house 16,000 people. Preparation involved a 1969 dredge-and-fill operation on the southwestern beach that was halted mid-way in the face of opposition from local conservation groups. The dredging permit expired in late 1969, and the Army Corps of Engineers and state agencies declined to renew it.

An eight-building, 449-unit residential complex known as Royal Stewart Arms was completed on 23 acres (9.3 ha) at the eastern end of the island in 1973 and remains the only non-park development on Honeymoon Island.

=== State park ===
Beginning on December 13, 1974, the Florida Board of Trustees of the Internal Improvement Trust Fund purchased the remaining undeveloped land from Hyman and Fay Green in six successive tracts totaling more than 2,790 acres (1,130 ha) between 1974 and 1980. This was accomplished using the Land Acquisition Trust Fund and Land and Water Conservation Fund as well as small donations from the city of Dunedin and Pinellas County in 1982 and 1983 respectively. The Trustees leased the property to the Florida Division of Recreation and Parks on December 7, 1981, for a fifty-year term, and the park opened to the public later that month.

The Rotary Centennial Nature Center, an interpretive facility built with support from local Rotary clubs and volunteers, was dedicated in May 2007. A ferry to Caladesi Island State Park operates from a dock on the island's southeast shore, and a paved multi-use trail extending from the Fred Marquis Pinellas Trail system enters the park by way of the causeway.

=== Tropical storms and hurricanes ===
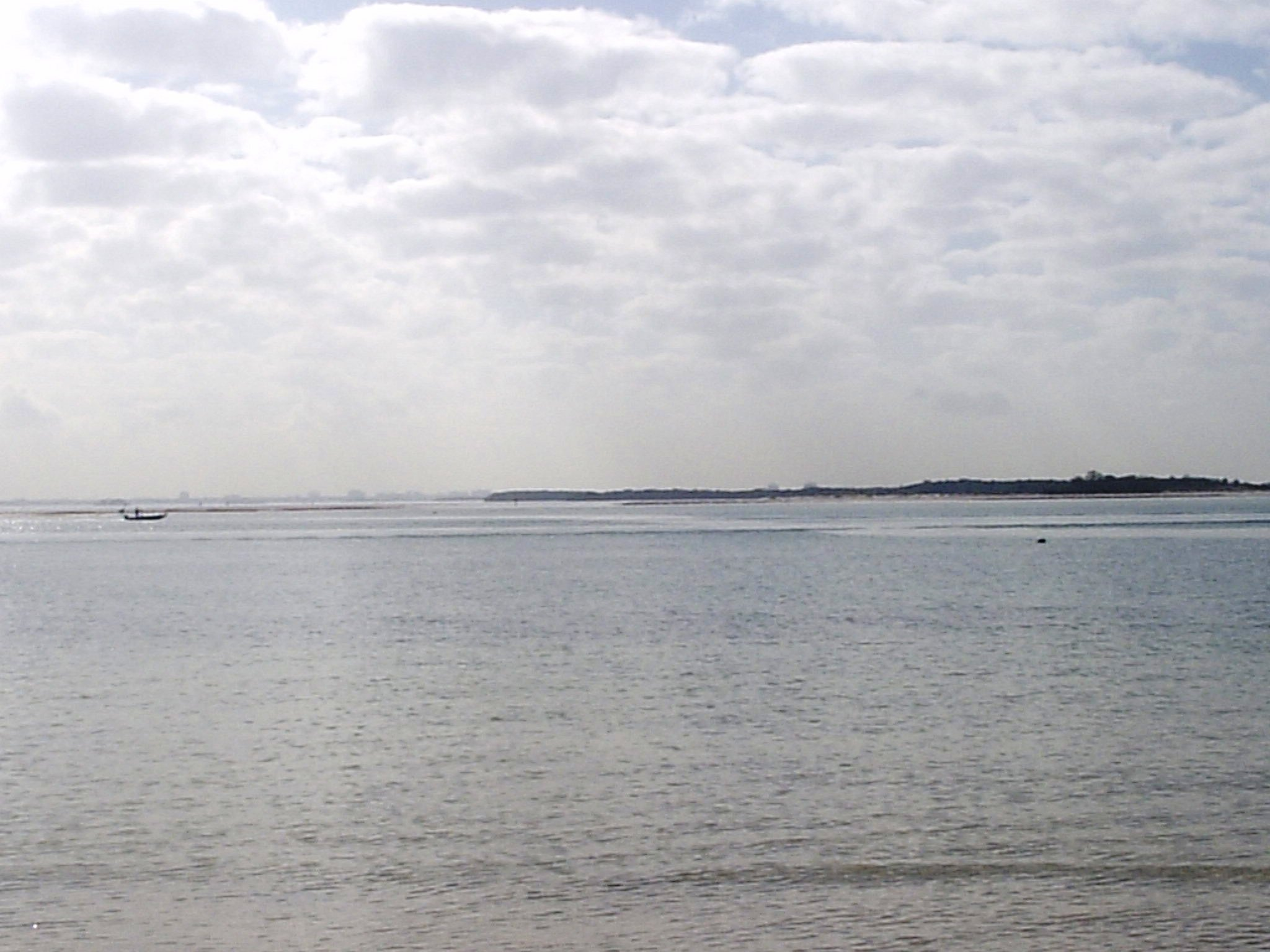
Hurricane Pass, cut through the former Hog Island by the 1921 Tampa Bay hurricane

Beyond the 1921 Tampa Bay hurricane that created the island in its modern form, Honeymoon Island has been reshaped by several later tropical cyclones. Hurricane Elena stalled off the Gulf coast near Cedar Key over Labor Day weekend in 1985. It eroded Pinellas County's beaches and cut a new tidal pass across the northern part of neighboring Caladesi Island, although most of the eroded sand returned after Hurricane Juan that October. Elena also stripped away the ebb-tidal delta of Dunedin Pass, at Caladesi's southern end, and the pass closed in 1988.

Hurricane Idalia passed to the north on August 30, 2023, generating storm surge that stripped sand from the beach parking lots. Hurricane Helene struck on September 26, 2024, and Hurricane Milton followed on October 9; the park stayed closed for damage assessment and partially reopened on Thanksgiving, November 28, 2024. In January 2025 sand was being dredged to rebuild the beaches while the north beach remained closed. By April 2025 the park was renourishing dunes along the southern 1.4 miles (2.3 km) of the island, which had suffered critical erosion during Helene.

== Archaeology ==
Honeymoon Island lies within the traditional territory of the Tocobaga, a group from the Safety Harbor culture that inhabited the shores of Tampa Bay and its estuaries from approximately AD 900 until coming into contact with the Spanish. Archaeological evidence of prehistoric occupation on Honeymoon Island itself is scarce. The Florida Master Site File, the state's inventory of cultural resources, records only two sites within the park. Both are recorded under the Smithsonian trinomial system, in which 8 is the state code for Florida and "Pi" abbreviates Pinellas County. The first site is 8Pi747 (Osprey Breeding site), a scatter of stone flakes and tool fragments first mapped in 1982, and the second is 8Pi11664 (Sand Spit site), a sand mound containing shell middens near the Osprey Trail. At the Sand Spit site, artifacts including two projectile points and a stone scraper have been recovered and are on display at the park's nature center. On the nearby island of Caladesi, Clarence B. Moore documented the Hog Island Mound (8Pi9) in 1903 as a burial mound containing skeletal remains of unspecified cultural affiliation.

Pottery shards and fragments of 16th-century European chain mail have been reported from the island, suggesting that the Spanish used the barrier as a stopover during the early colonial period, though no formal excavation or scholarly analysis of the finds has been published. An archaeological sensitivity model developed for the park in 2013 by the University of South Florida's Alliance for Integrated Spatial Technologies identified the Osprey Breeding site as an area with a high probability of containing additional cultural resources. Both recorded sites are assessed as being in poor condition owing to past land alteration and continuing sea-level rise.

== Geology and climate ==
Honeymoon Island lies in the coastal lagoon and barrier-island chain sub-zone of Florida's coastal lowlands, between St. Joseph Sound on the east and the Gulf of Mexico on the west. Elevations range from mean sea level to about 7 feet (2.1 m) on artificial berms; the highest natural features are the primary dune line along the Gulf shore. The underlying bedrock belongs to the lower Miocene Hawthorn Formation, an interbedded sequence of sand, clay, marl, limestone, fuller's earth, and phosphate nodules; the limestone platform is capped by a few feet of Pleistocene and Holocene sand and mud.

Radiocarbon-calibrated sea-level curves place the modern island at 4,800 to 7,000 years old. Following its formation, shoreline accretion enlarged the barrier during a period of slowing sea-level rise; an acceleration about 4,000 years ago drove shoreline retreat, and a further slowdown around 3,000 years ago began a second phase of growth that continues today.

=== Formation of Hurricane Pass ===
Honeymoon and Caladesi Islands were a single landmass, Hog Island, until the October 1921 hurricane cut Hurricane Pass through the barrier and permanently separated them. The storm produced tides roughly 9.8 feet (3 m) above normal. Regional geologist Richard A. Davis Jr. has described the same event as "probably the most devastating in recorded history as far as the Pinellas County coast is concerned"; it also opened Redfish Pass at Captiva Island and reshaped inlets from Anclote Key south to Sanibel.

=== Barrier-island dynamics ===
Since 1921 the island has undergone rapid morphological change under the low-energy, mixed-wave-and-tide regime of the west-central Florida coast, where mean wave height at the shore is less than 12 inches (30 cm). The southern half of the island was drastically altered in 1969, when about 1,500,000 yd^{3} (1,100,000 m^{3}) of fill were dredged from 2,000 feet (610 m) offshore and placed on the southwestern beach in preparation for a residential development that was never built. The fill included limestone pebbles and rocks as well as quartz sand. Longshore drift subsequently removed much of the sand, exposing a hardened shoreline of limestone rubble that has continued to complicate beach recreation and shorebird nesting.

Nearshore shoals along the northern half of the island coalesced with the shore as an exposed sand spit in the late 1970s. That spit now forms a curving, 2-mile (3.2 km) finger of beach, dune, coastal strand, and mangrove at the island's northern tip and has continued to lengthen at more than 160 ft (50 m) per year.

=== Climate ===
Honeymoon Island has a humid subtropical climate (Köppen Cfa). The nearest long-term weather station, at Tarpon Springs about 7 miles (11 km) to the northeast, records average highs of about 91 °F (33 °C) in July and August and 69 °F (21 °C) in January, and about 54 inches (1,400 mm) of precipitation a year. About 60 percent of the rain falls from June through September; August is the wettest month and November the driest.

== Ecology ==
The park is classified as a state recreation area by the Florida Park Service and all its surface waters are designated Outstanding Florida Waters. The park lies within the Pinellas County Aquatic Preserve established under the Florida Aquatic Preserve Act of 1975.

=== Natural communities ===
Ten Florida Natural Areas Inventory (FNAI) natural communities are mapped within the park; open marine habitats account for more than four-fifths of the total acreage, with the remainder being fragmented into a mix of small dune, grassland, flatwood, hammock, and mangrove stands. The mesic flatwoods are a rare surviving fragment of the coastal pine forests that once dominated the Pinellas Peninsula; early Spanish explorers called the peninsula punta pinal ("point of pines") for this vegetation.

Natural communities and developed land
Community	Area	Share
Marine substrate	1,417 acres (573 ha)	50%
Marine seagrass beds	889 acres (360 ha)	32%
Mangrove swamp	157 acres (64 ha)	6%
Mesic flatwoods	97 acres (39 ha)	3%
Coastal strand	76 acres (31 ha)	3%
Coastal grassland	72 acres (29 ha)	2%
Beach dune	35 acres (14 ha)	1%
Marine mollusk reef	9 acres (3.6 ha)	0.3%
Maritime hammock	5 acres (2.0 ha)	0.1%
Coastal interdunal swale	2 acres (0.81 ha)	0.1%
Developed	52 acres (21 ha)	2%
Artificial pond	14 acres (5.7 ha)	0.5%

=== Flora ===
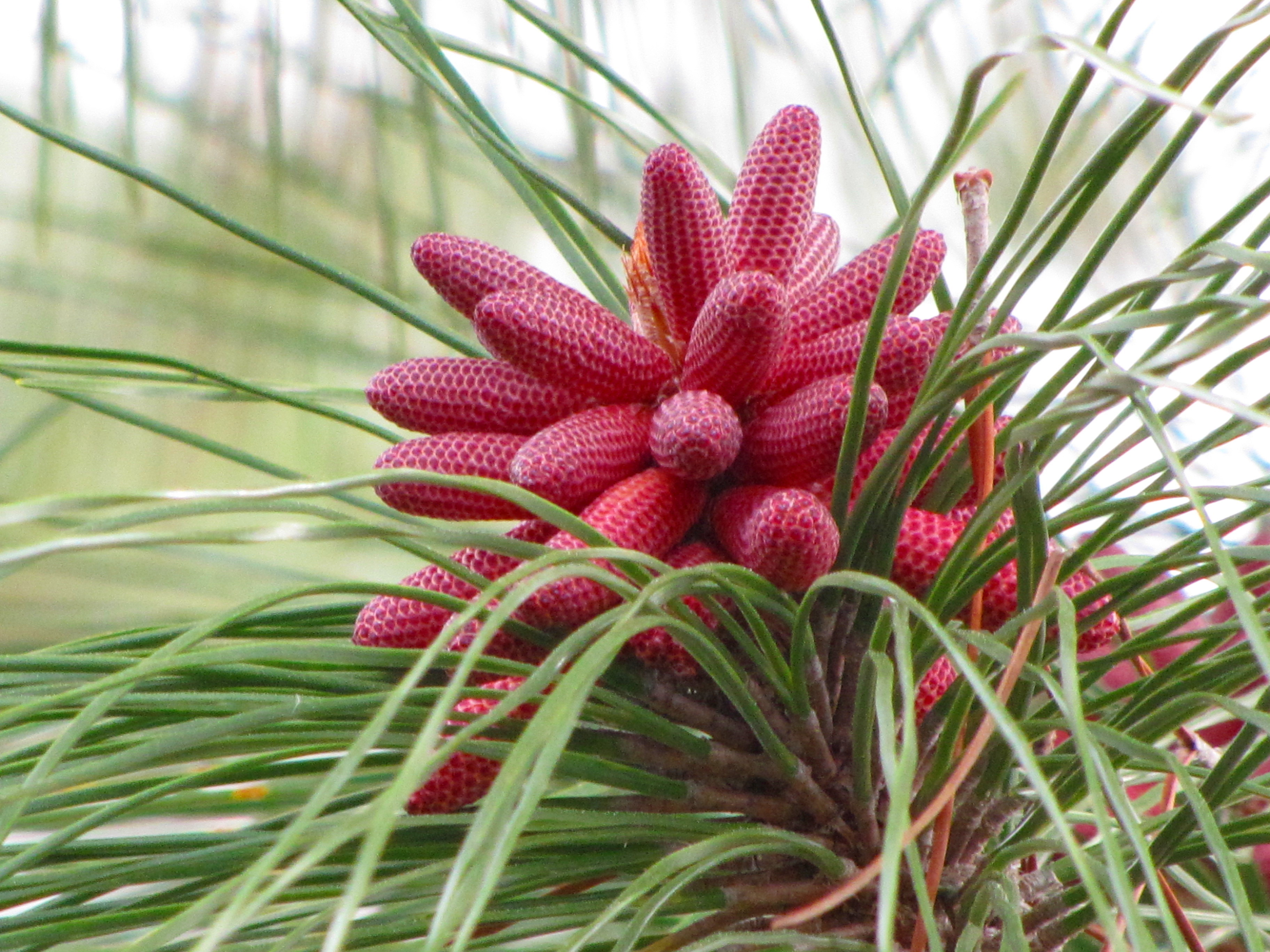
Pollen cones on a Slash Pine.

Slash pine, red cedar, and cabbage palm form the canopy of the mesic flatwoods, underlain by saw palmetto and seagrape. The primary dune line is anchored by sea oats, and the mangrove-fringed eastern shore supports black, red, and white mangroves in classic zonation. Bayside meadows of manatee grass, shoal grass, and turtle grass expanded within St. Joseph Sound by about 23 percent between 2006 and 2016. Three Florida-endemic plants occur in the park, of which the West Coast dune sunflower is the most restricted, confined to six coastal counties and threatened by hybridization with landscaping stock of the East Coast subspecies.

=== Fauna ===
Forty-two imperiled animal species have been catalogued by the Division of Recreation and Parks, including three sea turtles, fifteen shorebirds and seabirds, and one large mammal.

==== Birds ====
Approximately three hundred bird species have been documented in the park. The Osprey Trail contains about twenty active osprey nests each spring and has been described as one of the best places in the world to observe nesting ospreys. Bald eagles have nested in pine trees at the park since 2009, and great horned owls use the same canopy each winter. Beach-nesting shorebirds documented in the park include Wilson's plover, snowy plover, American oystercatcher, least tern, and black skimmer. Colonial species have largely stopped nesting on the main beach since the mid-2010s.

An American Oystercatcher spotted at the park

A statewide winter shorebird survey conducted in the mid-1990s ranked Honeymoon Island second on Florida's southwest coast for wintering shorebird importance and third in the state. Federally threatened piping plover and red knot both use the island's inlet-adjacent flats during migration and winter; the federal recovery plan for the piping plover identifies sandy beaches near inlets as important wintering habitat. Rarities on the park's bird checklist include bar-tailed godwit, long-billed murrelet, northern wheatear, and green-tailed towhee.

==== Gopher tortoise ====
The park supports one of Florida's densest coastal populations of the state-threatened gopher tortoise. A 2017 Florida Natural Areas Inventory (FNAI) survey estimated roughly 200 tortoises across about 150 acres (61 ha) of suitable upland habitat, with the highest densities in the coastal strand; rangers have also observed tortoises swimming between Honeymoon and Caladesi Islands, indicating occasional interchange between the two populations. FNAI rated the population as viable but warned that the island's small size leaves it vulnerable to catastrophic losses from tropical storms or upper respiratory tract disease.

==== Other wildlife ====
The eastern diamondback rattlesnake is common on the island and often shares gopher tortoise burrows; the state-threatened eastern indigo snake was recorded historically but has not been seen in recent decades. Florida manatees forage on the seagrass meadows in warm months, and bottlenose dolphins regularly enter the shallows. Loggerhead sea turtles nest in low numbers on the Gulf shore between May and September each year, and stranded juvenile green, Kemp's ridley, and hawksbill sea turtles have been recovered during winter cold-stun events.

== Management ==
Honeymoon Island is managed under a ten-year unit management plan approved by the Florida Department of Environmental Protection's Acquisition and Restoration Council on February 11, 2022, replacing an earlier 2007 plan.

=== Prescribed fire ===
Longleaf pine after a controlled burn

About 131 acres (53 ha) of the park, comprising all mesic flatwoods and coastal strand, are managed with prescribed fire on a five-year rotation. The acreage is divided into thirteen management zones grouped into five clusters of roughly 25 acres (10 ha) that are burned as units each year in coordination with the Florida Forest Service. Fire opens the understory for gopher tortoises and reduces dangerous fuel loads, but activity is limited from February to May for bald eagle and osprey nesting seasons; a 330-foot (100 m) buffer is maintained around active eagle nests.

=== Shorebird and sea turtle protection ===
Beach-nesting shorebirds and sea turtle nests are marked with rope and signage in accordance with Florida Fish and Wildlife Conservation Commission standards, and portions of the dunes are pre-posted before the nesting season to reduce disturbance to breeding and roosting birds. Park staff and trained volunteers survey the beach daily from April 15 to October 31, marking and screening every sea turtle nest to deter raccoon predation. The Division of Recreation and Parks contracted the United States Department of Agriculture to trap coastal predators in 2021, removing 103 raccoons in nine days on and around the beach; predator control has since been conducted annually ahead of nesting season.

=== Invasive species ===
Decades of aggressive treatment have reduced infestations of Australian pine and Brazilian pepper to maintenance levels; longtime residents recall the beach adjacent to Hurricane Pass in the 1970s as a grove of 50-foot (15 m) Australian pines, and the Osprey Trail once passed through tunnels of Brazilian pepper. More than twenty Florida Invasive Species Council Category I and II plants are actively managed; ongoing threats include cogongrass, rosary pea, and beach naupaka.

== Recreation ==
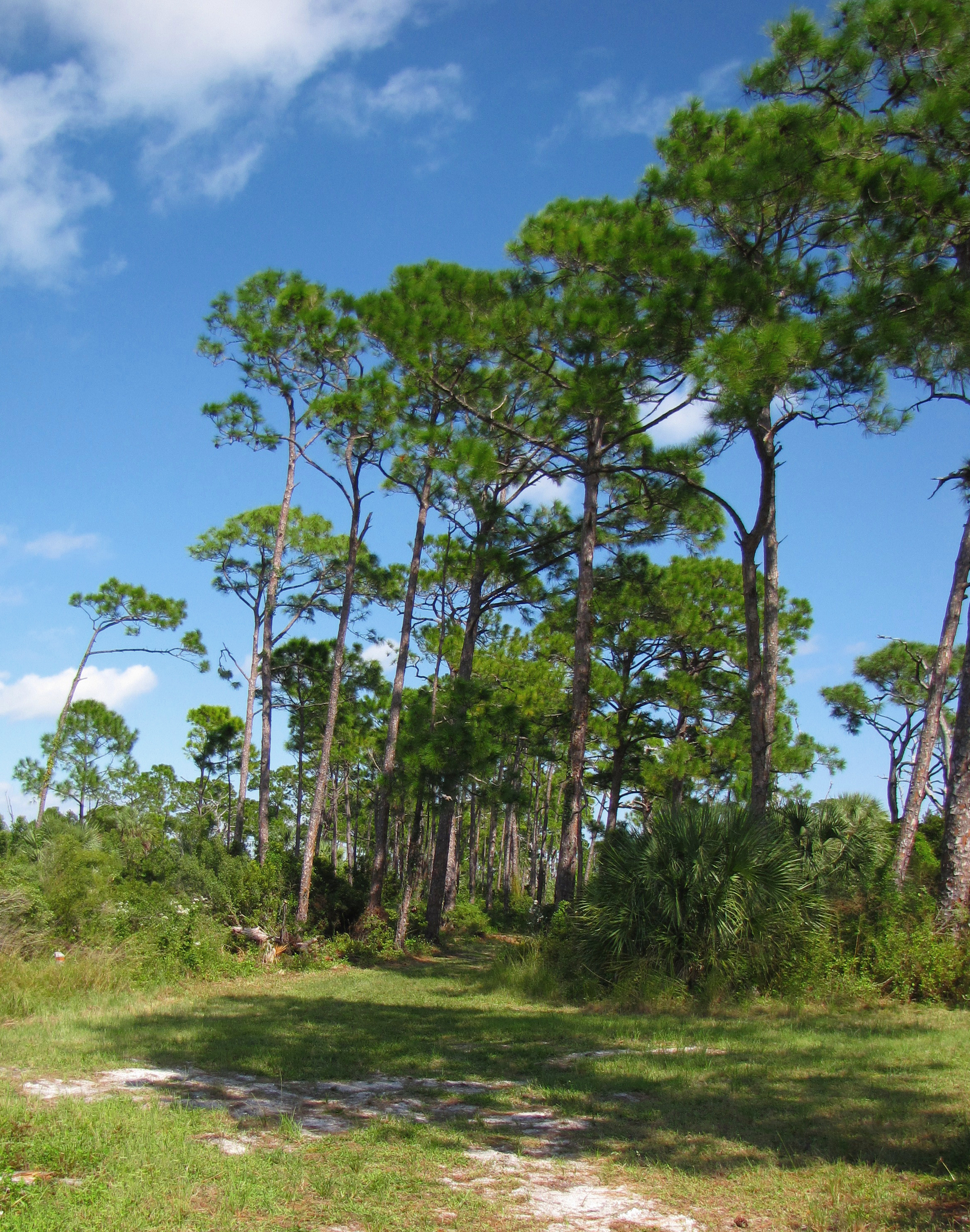
Slash Pines along Osprey Trail

The park is open every day of the year from 8 a.m. to sundown and charges a per-vehicle daily entrance fee. Visitor amenities include a bathhouse and concession at each of the North and South Beach areas, picnic pavilions, a pet beach along Hurricane Pass, and the Rotary Centennial Nature Center, which houses exhibits on the natural and cultural history of Honeymoon and Caladesi Islands and includes an elevated observation deck. A commercial ferry service runs between the southern tip of the park and Caladesi Island State Park across Hurricane Pass; Caladesi Island itself has no road access.

The park's trails cross the forested northern half of the island through pine flatwoods and along the mangrove-fringed bay shore, and a paved bike path connects the park entrance with the Dunedin Causeway and the wider Fred Marquis Pinellas Trail network. Popular activities include swimming, sunbathing, fishing, birdwatching, and shelling.

Trails at Honeymoon Island State Park
Name	Length	Surface	Description
Osprey Trail	2.5 mi (4.0 km)	Natural	Loop through mesic flatwoods with active osprey and bald eagle nests
Pelican Cove Trail	0.75 mi (1.21 km)	Natural	Spur along the mangrove shore of Pelican Cove
Nature Trail	0.25 mi (0.40 km)	Boardwalk	Interpretive loop at the Rotary Centennial Nature Center
Bike Path	1.5 mi (2.4 km)	Paved	Park entrance to the Dunedin Causeway, linking the Pinellas Trail

=== Visitation and economic impact ===
Honeymoon Island has averaged about 1.27 million visitors per year over the decade to 2021 and is consistently one of the two most visited traditional state parks in Florida. The Florida Department of Environmental Protection recorded 1,528,178 visitors in fiscal year 2022–23, associated with an estimated $185 million in direct economic impact and the equivalent of 2,591 jobs in the local economy; the comparable figures for fiscal year 2021–22 were 1,389,439 visitors, $167 million, and 2,336 jobs. Peak visitation occurs between March and July.
