= St. Joseph Sound =

Body of water in Pasco County, Florida

Coordinates: 28°07′11″N 82°48′37″W

St. Joseph Sound is a body of water on the Gulf of Mexico coast of Pasco and Pinellas counties. The sound lies between the mainland and Anclote Key, Three Rooker Island, and Honeymoon Island, from the north end of Anclote Key to the Dunedin Causeway. The Anclote River feeds into St. Joseph Sound.

There is a chain of spoil islands in St. Joseph Sound. These islands were created during the process of dredging channels in the sound.
