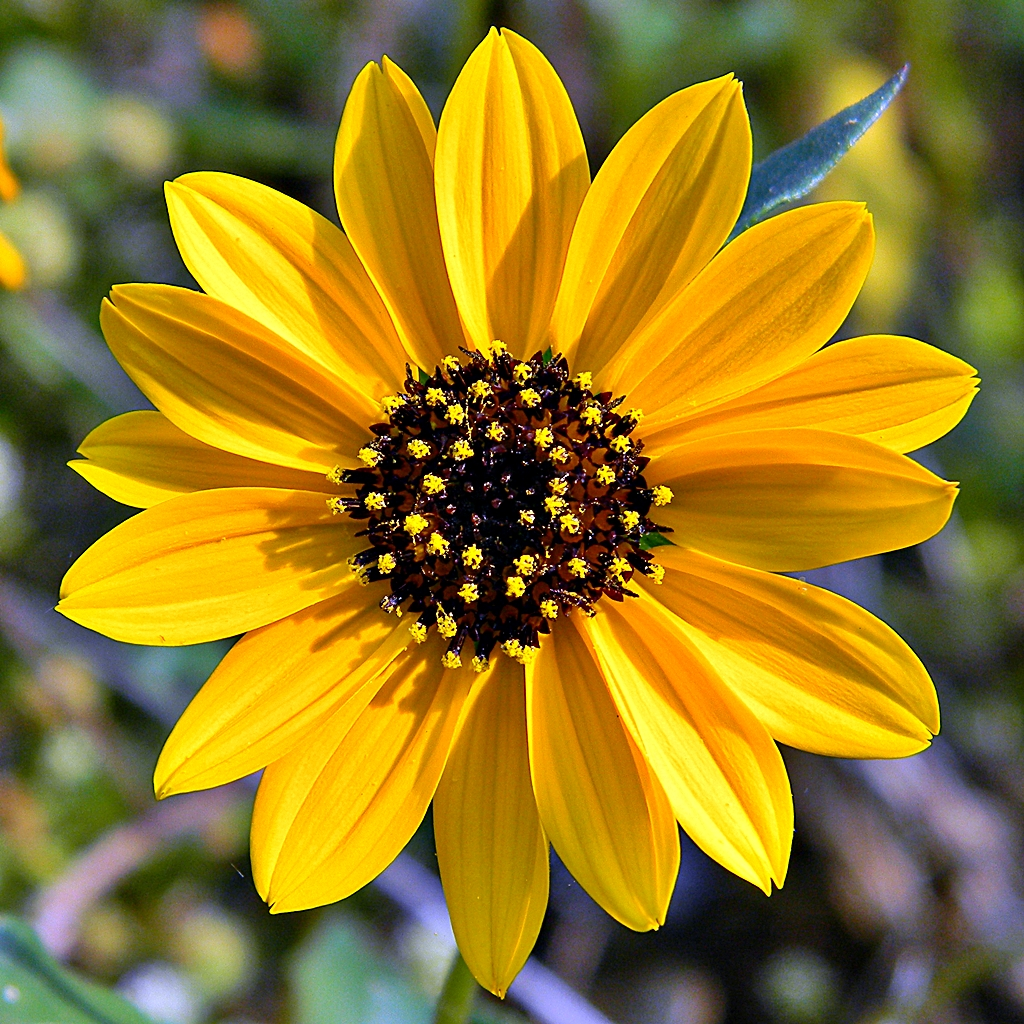

Conservation status
- Secure (NatureServe)

Scientific classification
- Kingdom: Plantae
- Clade: Tracheophytes
- Clade: Angiosperms
- Clade: Eudicots
- Clade: Asterids
- Order: Asterales
- Family: Asteraceae
- Tribe: Heliantheae
- Genus: Helianthus
- Species: H. debilis

Binomial name
- Helianthus debilis Nutt.

Synonyms
- Helianthus cucumerifolius Torr. & A.Gray, syn of subsp. cucumerifolius; Helianthus vestitus E.Watson, syn of subsp. vestitus

= Helianthus debilis =

Species of sunflower

Helianthus debilis is a species of sunflower known by the common names cucumberleaf sunflower, beach sunflower, weak sunflower, East Florida beach sunflower, and East Coast dune sunflower. It is native to the United States, where it can be found along the Atlantic and Gulf Coasts. It is known elsewhere as an introduced species, such as South Africa, Australia, Taiwan, Slovakia, and Cuba.

This species may be an annual or perennial herb. It is usually perennial but it may last only one season in climates where freezes occur. It can reach a height of 2 meters. The stem grows from a taproot and may grow erect or decumbent. It can also spread along the ground, becoming a dense groundcover. The leaves are usually arranged alternately and are variable in shape and size. The largest are up to 14 centimeters long by 13 wide. The showy inflorescence is a single flower head or an array of two or three heads. There are up to 30 lance-shaped phyllaries each up to 1.7 centimeters long. There are up to 20 or 21 ray florets, each up to 2.3 centimeters long. They are usually yellow in the wild, but cultivars have been bred to bear whitish, reddish, or orange florets. The center of the head is filled with many red, yellowish, or purplish disc florets. The fruit, a cypsela, is roughly 2 or 3 millimeters long.

There are several subspecies. At one point there were eight. Five are currently recognized.

- Helianthus debilis subsp. cucumerifolius - cucumberleaf sunflower. The subspecies with the widest distribution.
- Helianthus debilis subsp. debilis - beach sunflower. Endemic to Florida.
- Helianthus debilis subsp. silvestris - forest sunflower. Endemic to Texas.
- Helianthus debilis subsp. tardiflorus - slow-flowering sunflower. Mississippi to Florida. Limited to rare, specialized coastal habitat.
- Helianthus debilis subsp. vestitus - clothed sunflower, hairy beach sunflower. Endemic to Florida. Imperiled; known from about 22 occurrences.

This species grows in several types of coastal habitat, sometimes directly on the beach. It tolerates a moderately saline environment, but not an excessive amount of salt spray or inundation. It is highly drought-tolerant and it will grow in low-nutrient and poor soils, such as alkaline and acidic soils and sand. The plant attracts butterflies and birds feed on the fruits.

This plant is used as a garden flower. It is also good for landscaping, especially in poor, dry soils. It is planted on beaches, where it forms a sand-binding groundcover that prevents erosion and stabilizes dunes. It requires supplemental watering only rarely, if ever. It may get "ratty-looking" after the showy flowers have withered. Available cultivars include 'Italian White', 'Flora Sun','Dazzler', 'Excelsior', and 'Orion'.

== Gallery ==
Dune Sunflowers growing in Miami Beach sand dunes (South Beach)

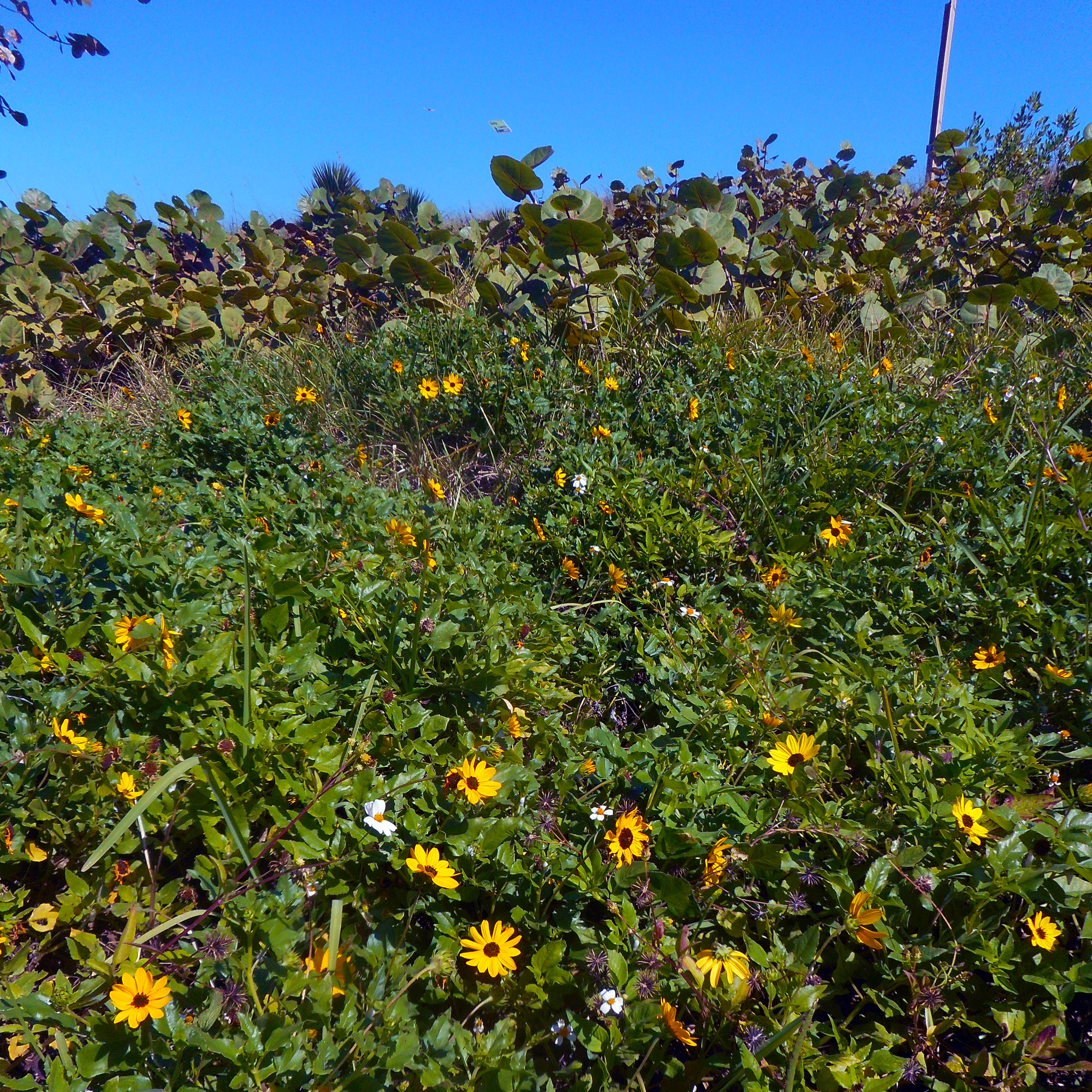
Sea Grapes and Dune Sunflowers

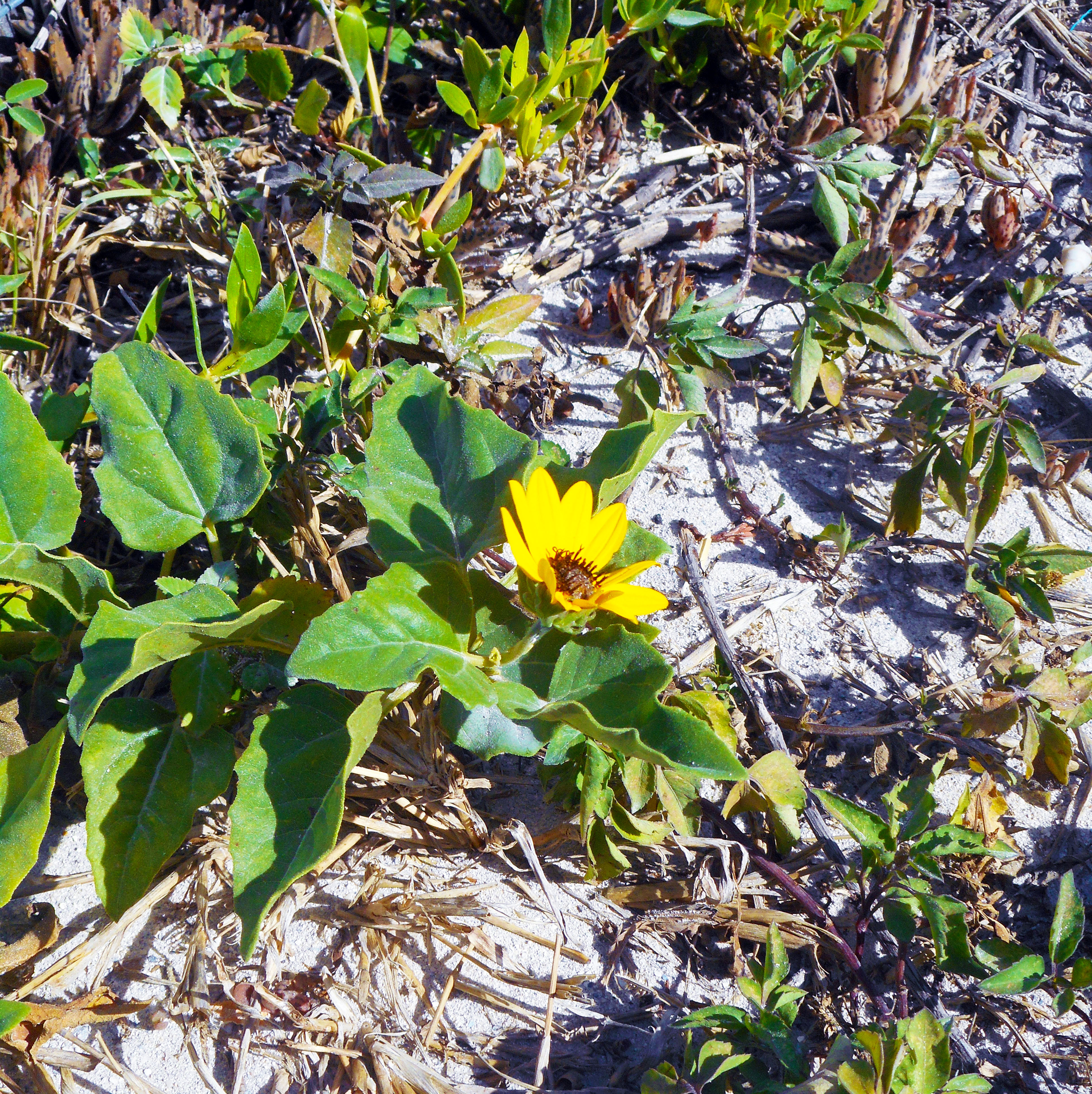
Dune Sunflower Closeup
