= Fort De Soto Park =

County park in Florida, USA

Fort De Soto
- Part of Endicott Period Coastal Defense
- Mullet Key, Pinellas County, Florida
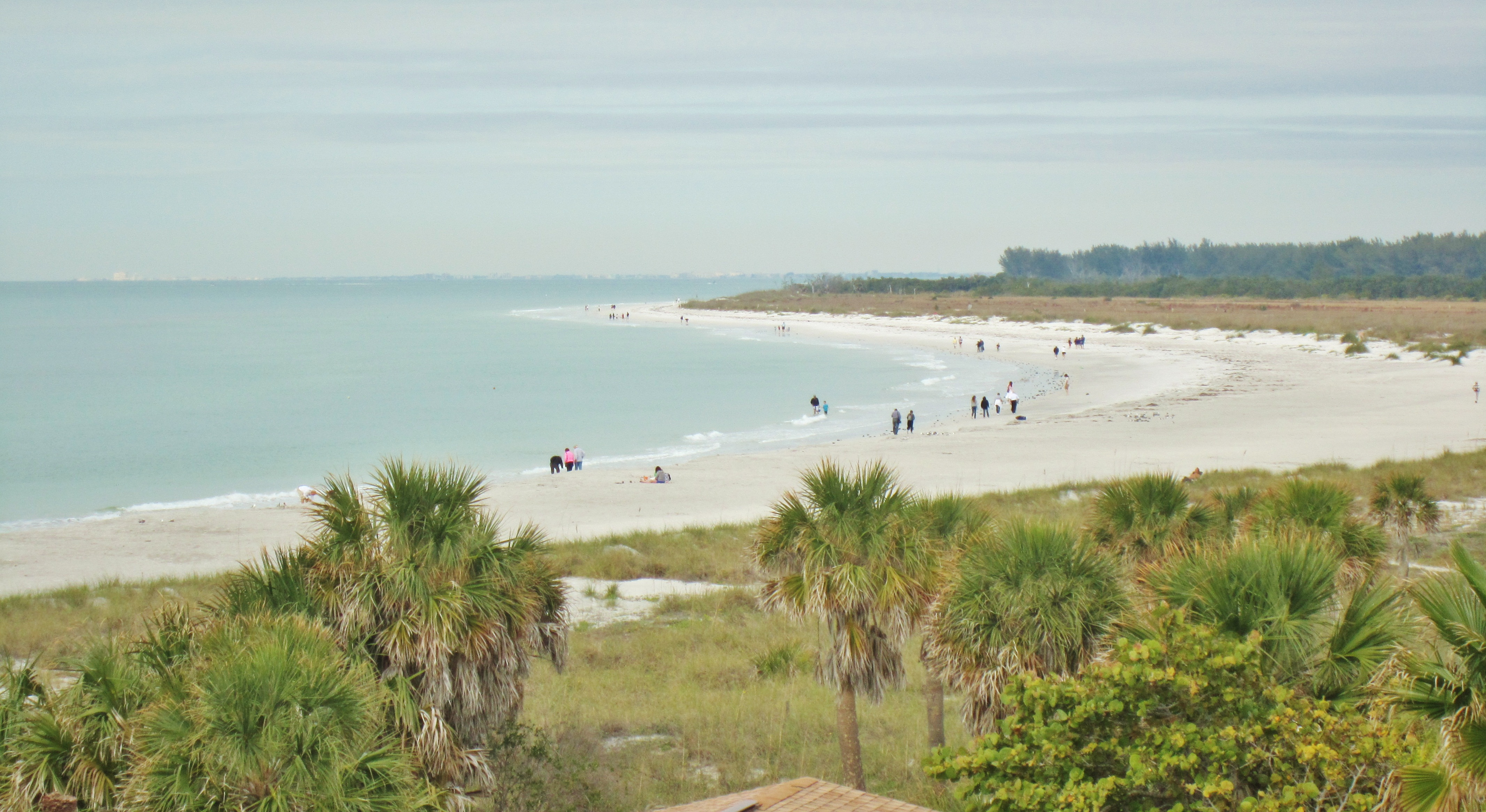
- One of the beaches of Fort De Soto Park (2012)

Site information
- Type: Seacoast defense
- Owner: Pinellas County
- Open to the public: Yes

Location
- Coordinates: 27.615499°N 82.735902°W

Site history
- Built: 1898–1906
- Built by: United States Army Corps of Engineers
- In use: 1898–1910
- Materials: Reinforced concrete
- Events: Spanish–American War
- Fort De Soto Batteries
- U.S. National Register of Historic Places
- Battery Laidley & Battery Bigelow
- Location within Florida Location within the United States
- Location: 8 miles (13 km) South of St. Petersburg, Mullet Key, Pinellas County, Florida
- NRHP reference No.: 77000407
- Added to NRHP: December 2, 1977

Fort De Soto Park is a county park located south-southwest of St. Petersburg, Florida, operated by Pinellas County. The park consists of five offshore keys, or islands: Madelaine Key, St. Jean Key, St. Christopher Key, Bonne Fortune Key and the main island, Mullet Key. The keys are connected by either bridge or causeway. The island group is accessible by toll road from the mainland. Historically, the islands were used for military fortifications; remnants and a museum exhibit this history. Two piers, beaches, picnic area, hiking trails, bicycling trails, kayak trail, and a ferry to Egmont Key State Park are available.

The park is a gateway site for the Great Florida Birding Trail.

== History ==
=== Early history ===
The area of today's Fort De Soto was originally inhabited by the Tocobaga Native Americans from about 1000 to 1500 ACE. They lived on Mullet Key and other barrier islands in the area, eating fish, clams, conch, oysters and whelks from the Gulf of Mexico. Their diet was supplemented by occasional game food as well as the plants they gathered.

In 1529, the Spanish explorer Pánfilo de Narváez investigated the barrier islands after his expedition landed between St. Pete Beach and Clearwater, Florida. Ten years later, Hernando De Soto came ashore somewhere near the southern part of Tampa Bay, beginning what would culminate in the conquest of Florida for the Spanish Empire.

=== Military use ===
In 1849, a detachment of US Army engineers, including future Confederate General Robert E. Lee surveyed the area. They recommended that Egmont Key be fortified, and that other islands in the area be reserved for possible military use. Mullet Key was accordingly declared a military reservation later that year. There was no attempt to fortify the two islands before the start of the American Civil War.

Confederate forces briefly occupied Egmont and Mullet keys early in the Civil War, but soon withdrew to Tampa, after removing equipment from the Egmont Key Lighthouse. The Union Army occupied the two islands by mid-July 1861. The close proximity of the islands to the main channel into Tampa Bay aided in the Union naval blockade of Tampa Bay. Egmont Key Light was not lit during the war due to the Confederate removal of essential equipment, but the lighthouse served as an observation tower for the blockade. The United States Navy established a refugee camp on Egmont Key for Union sympathizers from west central Florida. A Union raid on Tampa in May 1864 searched for the equipment taken from the lighthouse, but could not find all of it.

Following the Civil War, the Board of Engineers for Fortifications recommended that the military reservation of Mullet Key be continued. The island was surveyed in 1876, and the military reservations of Egmont and Mullet keys were made permanent by executive proclamation in 1882. In 1885, interests in St. Petersburg proposed that the Orange Belt Railway be extended to a terminal on Mullet Key serving ocean-going passenger ships. A request to sell Mullet Key, or to grant the railroad a right-of-way, was rejected by Secretary of War William Endicott because of the military reservation.

Fortifications were not built on the islands until the Spanish–American War.

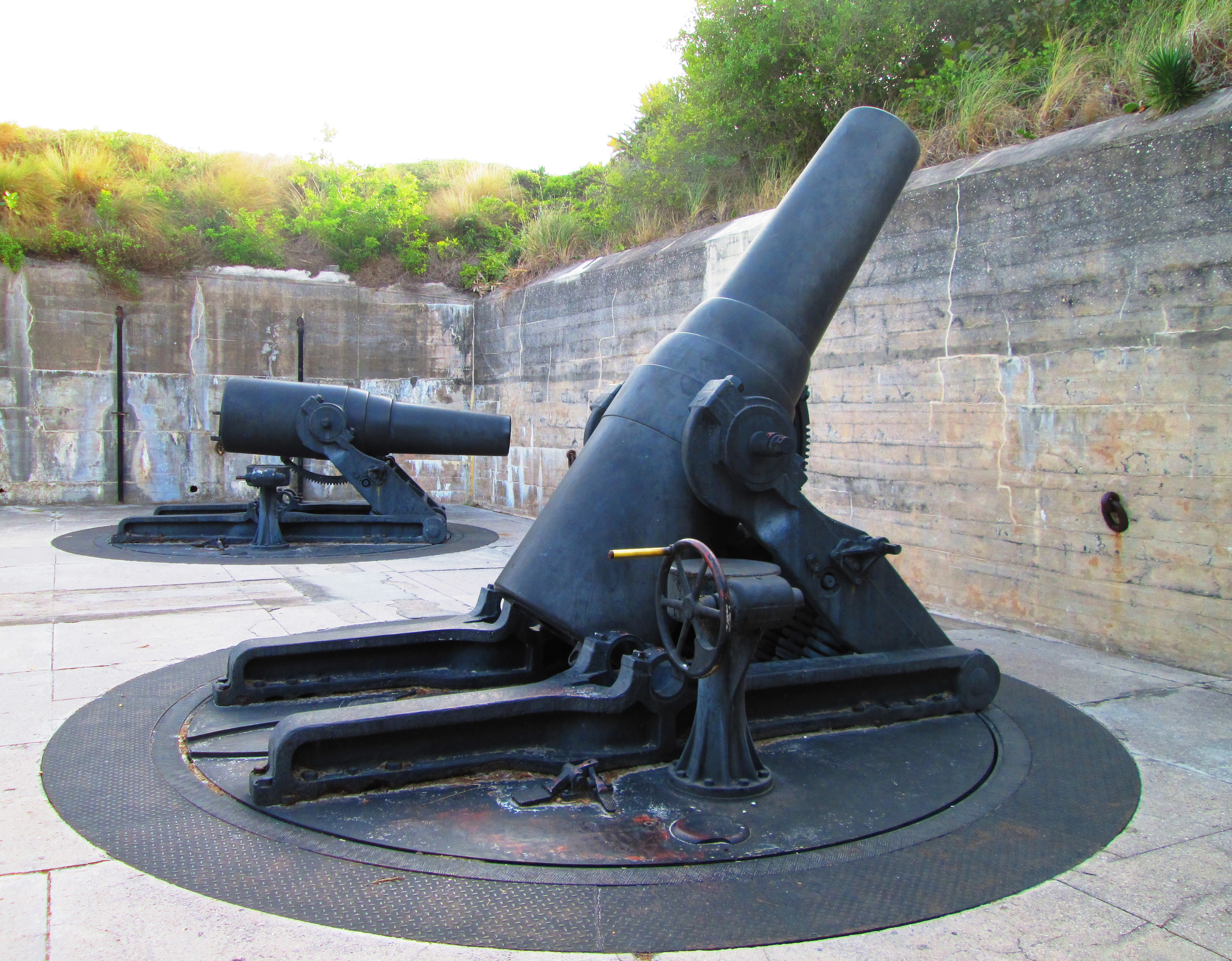
Two of Fort De Soto's remaining four 12-inch coastal defense mortars of Battery Laidley. The battery originally had 8 of these guns, two in each "pit"; these guns are in Pit "A". These M 1890-MI breech-loading and rifled mortars, which were built by Watervliet Arsenal of Watervliet, New York, had a maximum range of 1.25 mi (2.01 km) at a 70° elevation and 6.8 mi (10.9 km) at 45°. It took a crew of 12 men to operate them.

Hillsborough County established a quarantine station on the eastern side of Mullet Key in 1889. It became known as Mullet Key Quarantine Station. The Marine Hospital Service took over jurisdiction of the station in 1901. The duty of the station was to inspect aliens aboard ships arriving from foreign ports. By 1925, the station operated with fifteen buildings. The quarantine station operated until 1937, when the Public Health Service transferred its operations there to Gadsden Point, near Tampa.

The main operation on Mullet Key was named Fort De Soto in 1900, in honor of Hernando de Soto. The Army post was officially a subpost of Fort Dade, which was constructed on Egmont Key. These posts were to contain batteries of artillery and mortars to protect Tampa Bay from any invading forces. Construction of Fort De Soto began in November 1898 and was completed in 1906. The foundation was constructed of a seashell concrete formula, and the walls and ceiling used a seashell, stone, and concrete mix. The fort contained artillery and 12-inch coast defense mortar batteries, Batteries Laidley and Bigelow. The post consisted of 29 buildings. The post's features included a large barracks, a hospital, a guardhouse, a blacksmith and carpenter shop, an administration building, and mess hall with kitchen, a bakery, and a storehouse. The site also had brick roads, concrete sidewalks, and a narrow-gauge railroad to aid in moving materials and supplies around the post.

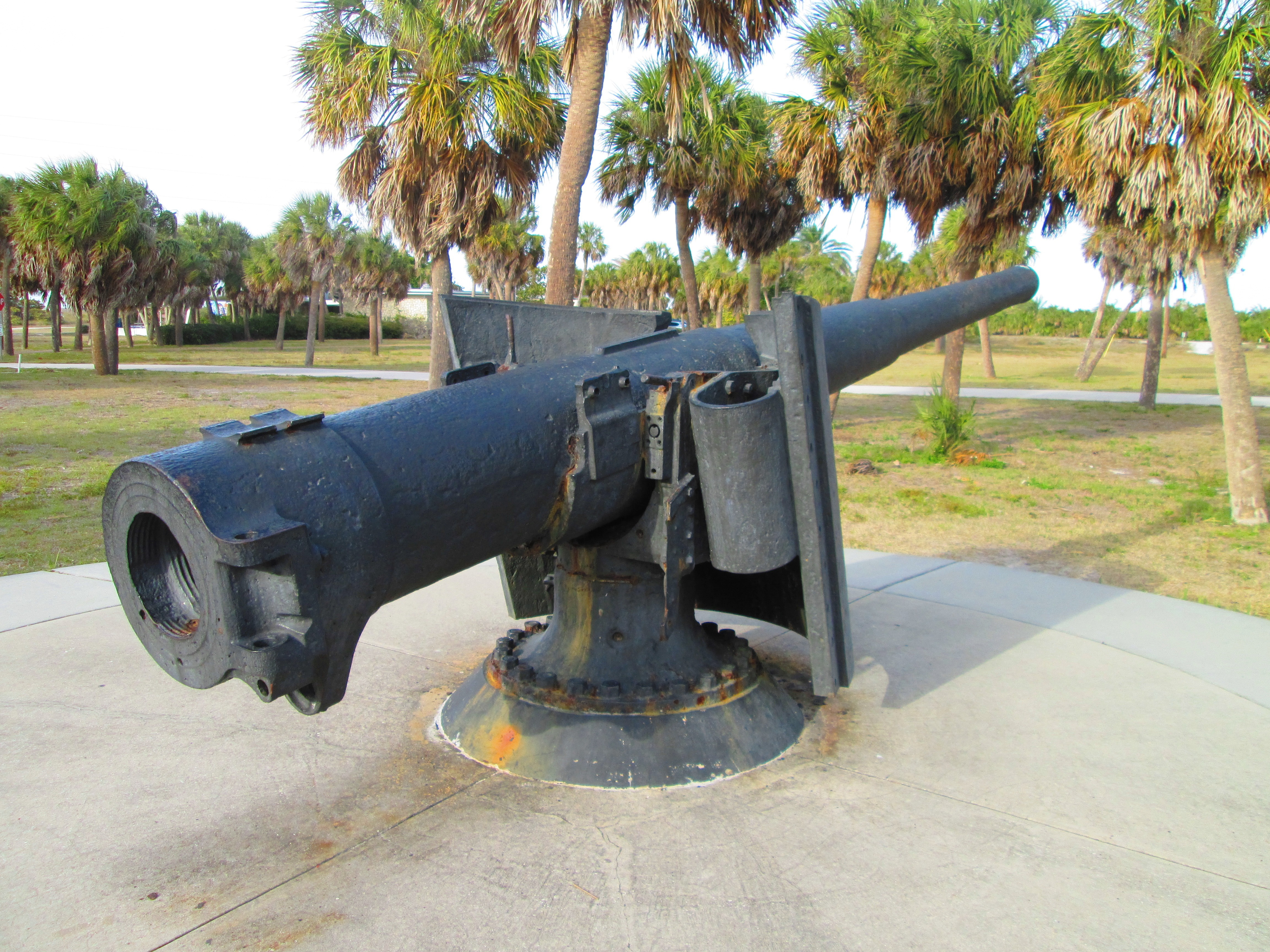
One of Fort De Soto Park's two 6-inch 40-caliber rapid-fire Armstrong guns. Originally located at Fort Dade on Egmont Key, the guns were refurbished and remounted for display at Fort De Soto in 1980.

Fort De Soto was active from 1898 to 1910. At least one company was present at Fort De Soto at all times and many times several units were present. Mosquitoes were a constant problem and the post was very hot in the summers. In 1910, most of the Army troops were moved from Fort De Soto to Fort Morgan, Alabama. Only a caretaker force remained; by 1914, only an ordnance sergeant and game warden remained at the post. Through most of World War I, a larger caretaker force was at the post, usually with about twenty-two privates, two noncommissioned officers, and two commissioned officers. In 1917, four of Fort De Soto's mortars were disassembled and shipped to Fort Rosecrans in San Diego, California.

Coast Defenses of Tampa
Batteries	No. Guns	Weapon/Mount	Location	Remarks
Battery Laidley	8	12" Mortar	Fort De Soto	Partially disarmed 1921
Battery McIntosh	2	8" Gun, Disappearing Carriage	Fort Dade	Disarmed 1923
Battery Howard	2	6" Gun, Disappearing Carriage	Fort Dade	Disarmed 1926
Battery Burchsted	2	6" Armstrong Gun, Pedestal Mount	Fort Dade	Disarmed 1919
Battery Burchsted	1	3" Gun, Masking Pedestal Mount	Fort Dade	Disarmed 1920
Battery Bigelow	2	3" Gun, Masking Pedestal Mount	Fort De Soto	Disarmed 1920
Battery Mellon	3	3" Gun, Masking Pedestal Mount	Fort Dade	Disarmed 1920
Battery Page	2	3" Gun, Pedestal Mount	Fort Dade	Disarmed 1919

In November 1922, the Army announced it would de-activate both Forts De Soto and Dade. On 1 July 1924, the Harbor Defenses of Tampa were de-activated, designated as a subordinate installation of the Harbor Defenses of Pensacola, and reduced to caretaker status. By 1926, the forts had been disarmed except for four 12-inch mortars of Battery Laidley at Fort De Soto, which remained under caretaker status. The forts were meant to be reactivated and rearmed in time of war, but that never occurred. From 1929, the 637th Coast Artillery Regiment's mobilization assignment was the Coast Defenses of Tampa, but that unit was never initiated in the Organized Reserve. On 16 November 1935, the Headquarters, Headquarters Battery, and the Medical Department Detachment of the Coast Defenses of Tampa were organized with Regular Army Inactive (Organized Reserve) personnel from the Fourth Corps Area at large. A number of tropical storms and hurricanes severely damaged the buildings on the post. A few were destroyed, as was Battery Bigelow in 1932. The Army attempted to sell the post, but there was little interest. In September 1938, Pinellas County bought the areas on Mullet Key for $12,500.

=== Conversion to civilian use ===
Shortly after Pinellas County purchased Mullet Key, county commissioners granted a lease to Percy L. Roberts for the use of land and buildings on the island the Mullet Key Quarantine Service had once used. The St. Petersburg Times reported the commission's action in its January 25, 1939, edition:

Lease of Mullet Key buildings to Percy Roberts was ratified Monday by county commissioners who made no change in the tentative lease approved last week.

Roberts will pay the county $50 a month for the first year and $100 a month for the next two years for the lease of two buildings on the extreme south end of the county's property on the key.

The lessee will operate a daily boat service to the island and will serve fish dinners and rent fishing tackle. The distance from his dock near the Bee Line ferry will be 10 miles. He will land in a sheltered cove on the north end of the island. Trips will be started in about three weeks.

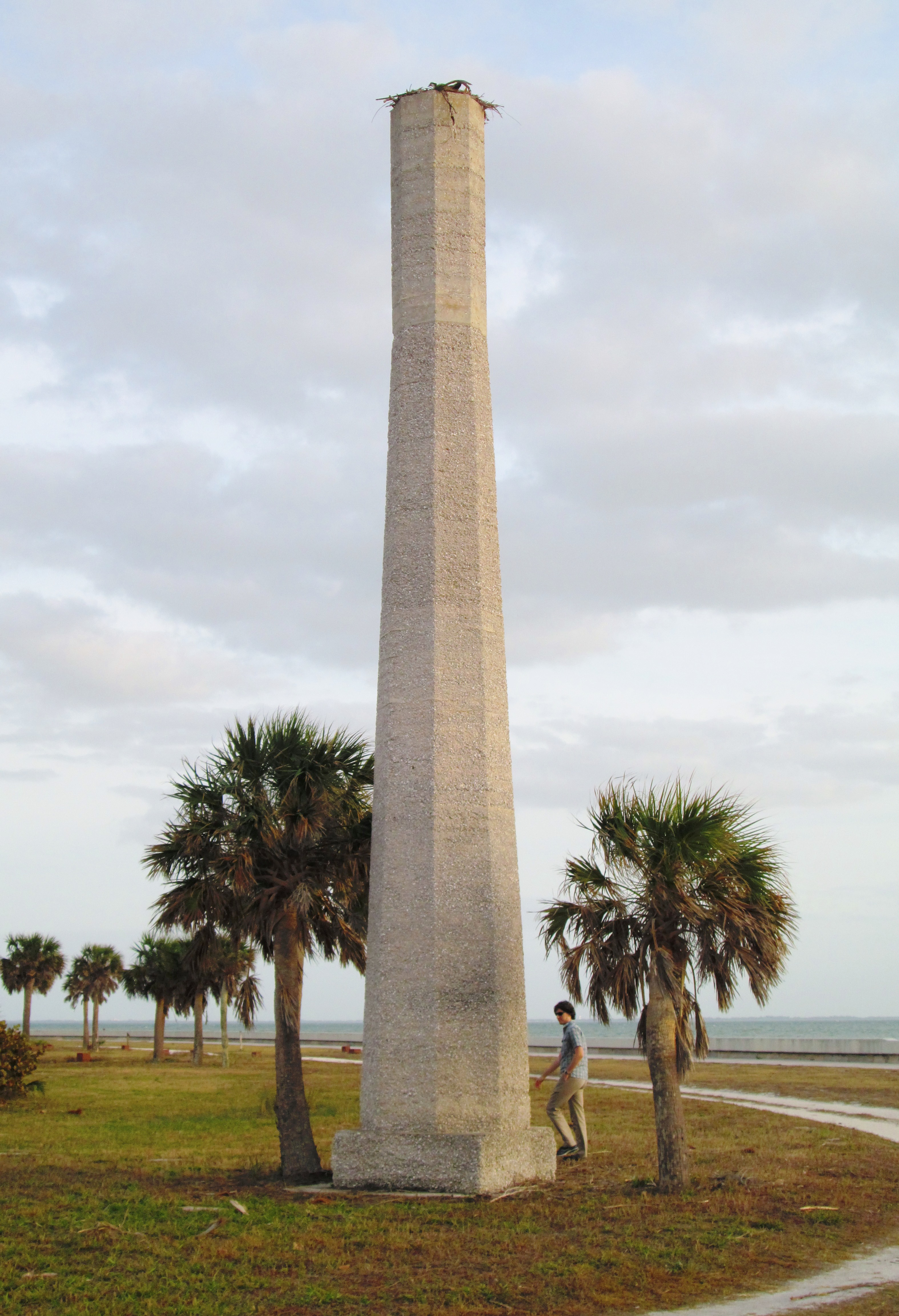
The remains of an observation tower

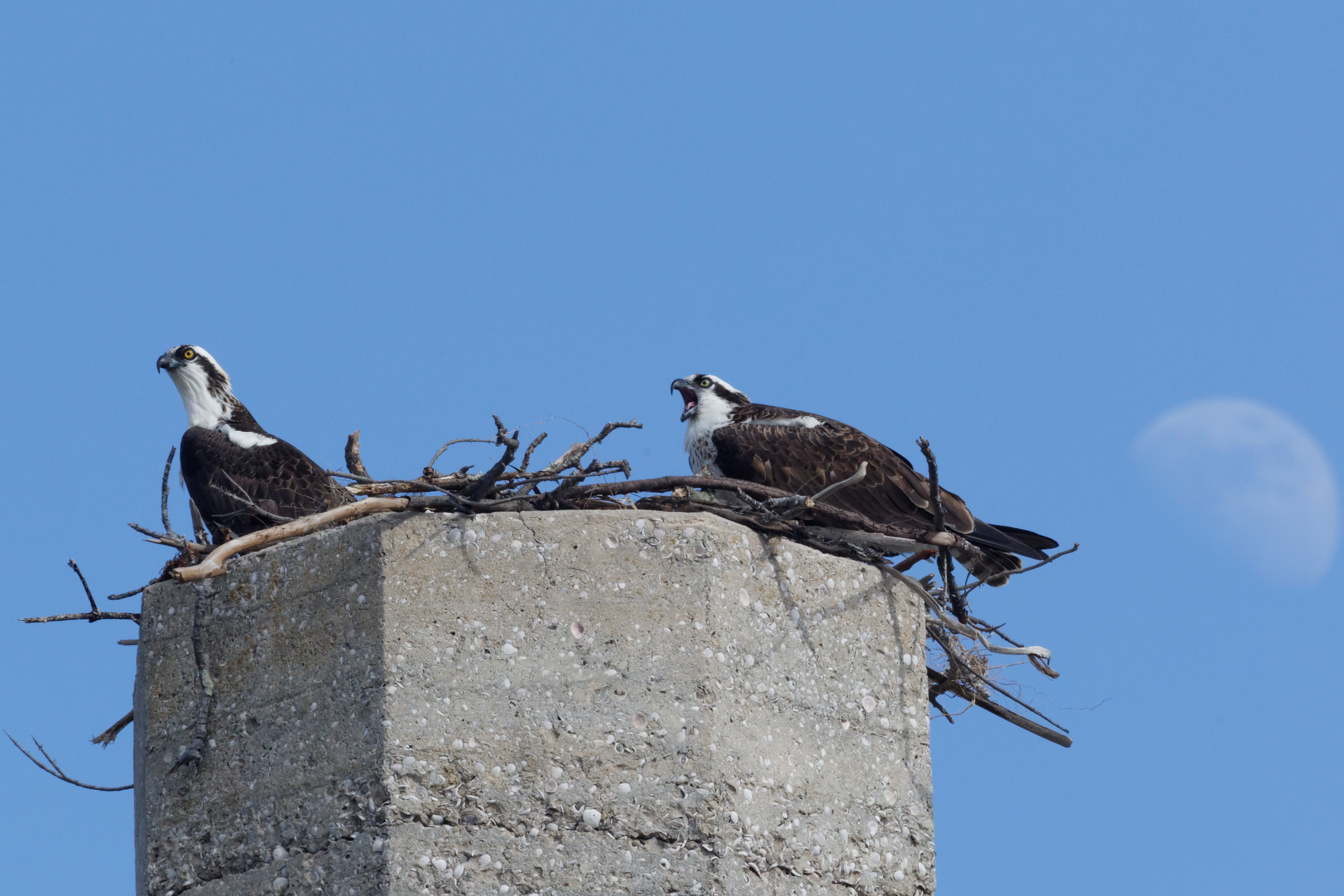
Osprey nesting at the top of the tower

Roberts, a native of St. Petersburg and local plumbing contractor, had a simple business plan. First, run a passenger boat to Mullet Key facilitating access to the isolated island. This service was expected to attract both fishermen and sightseers. For the fishermen, easy access to the pristine fishing waters of lower Tampa Bay; for the sightseers, easy access to the ruins of historic Fort De Soto and the white-sand beaches facing the Gulf of Mexico. Secondly, establish a hotel and restaurant on the island. Roberts envisioned creating a venue on the island appealing to clubs, associations, and other organizations for group outings of members for fishing, sightseeing, and "dining on fried mullet".

With lease in hand and business plan formulated, and with the financial support of Charles R. Carter, a local insurance executive and president of the Bee Line Ferry Co., Roberts immediately began implementing his plan.

For transportation to the isolated island, the passenger boat Hobo was put into service. Hobo operated daily from the Bee Line Ferry Terminal at St. Petersburg's Pinellas Point, pulling away from the dock early morning and leaving for the return trip late afternoon. Hobo was also available for chartered trips in between scheduled runs. "By boat" was not the only means of transportation to the island. A strip of land on the island was cleared in response to requests by some who wanted to fly small aircraft in and out.

Lodging and eating accommodations on the island were fashioned by renovating a building vacated by the Quarantine Service in 1937. The facility at best was austere, but one who was tired and hungry could get a good night's sleep; plenty of coffee, a hearty serving of bacon and eggs for breakfast; any of an assortment of sandwiches for lunch; and, a family style meal of fried mullet with all the trimmings for supper. A screened-in porch was there for those who just wanted to lean back, prop up the feet, enjoy a cool beverage, and relax. This facility became known familiarly as Mullet Key Lodge.

Rubert "Rube" Allyn, a writer for the St. Petersburg Times, included in his March 28, 1939, column, "Along the Waterfront":

When the Pinellas county commissioners leased the old Fort De Soto, and Mullet Key to Percy Roberts, they did a fine thing for the tourists by opening up the vast uninhabited reaches of Mullet Key and the old fort to exploration parties ... Today for a nominal fee, one can take a boat at Pinellas Point, and go to Mullet Key, land at the old Quarantine dock, enjoy an old-fashioned fish dinner prepared in the same manner as the pioneers of 50 years ago, by the Roberts family, and explore miles of uninhabited beaches, bayous, and the old Spanish–American War fort ...

=== Bombing range ===
In less than two years, Mullet Key Lodge became well established and profitable. However, this first for-profit business founded on the island was short-lived. The lease, granted to Roberts in 1939, had to be rescinded because the US War Department decided it wanted the island back for use as a bombing range by the U.S. Army Air Corps in support of air bases then being constructed in the Tampa Bay area. That pending transaction was reported by the St. Petersburg Times on December 18, 1940:

Mullet Key purchased by the county from the Treasury department in 1938 for $12,500 will soon be taken over by the United States Army Air Corps for use as a bombing range. The Air Corps will pay the county all that has been expended to date and will pay to Capt. Charles R. Carter all he has expended in improving the building into a fishing lodge. It is understood that Capt. Carter has an investment of about $8,000 while the county's total investment is about $13,800.

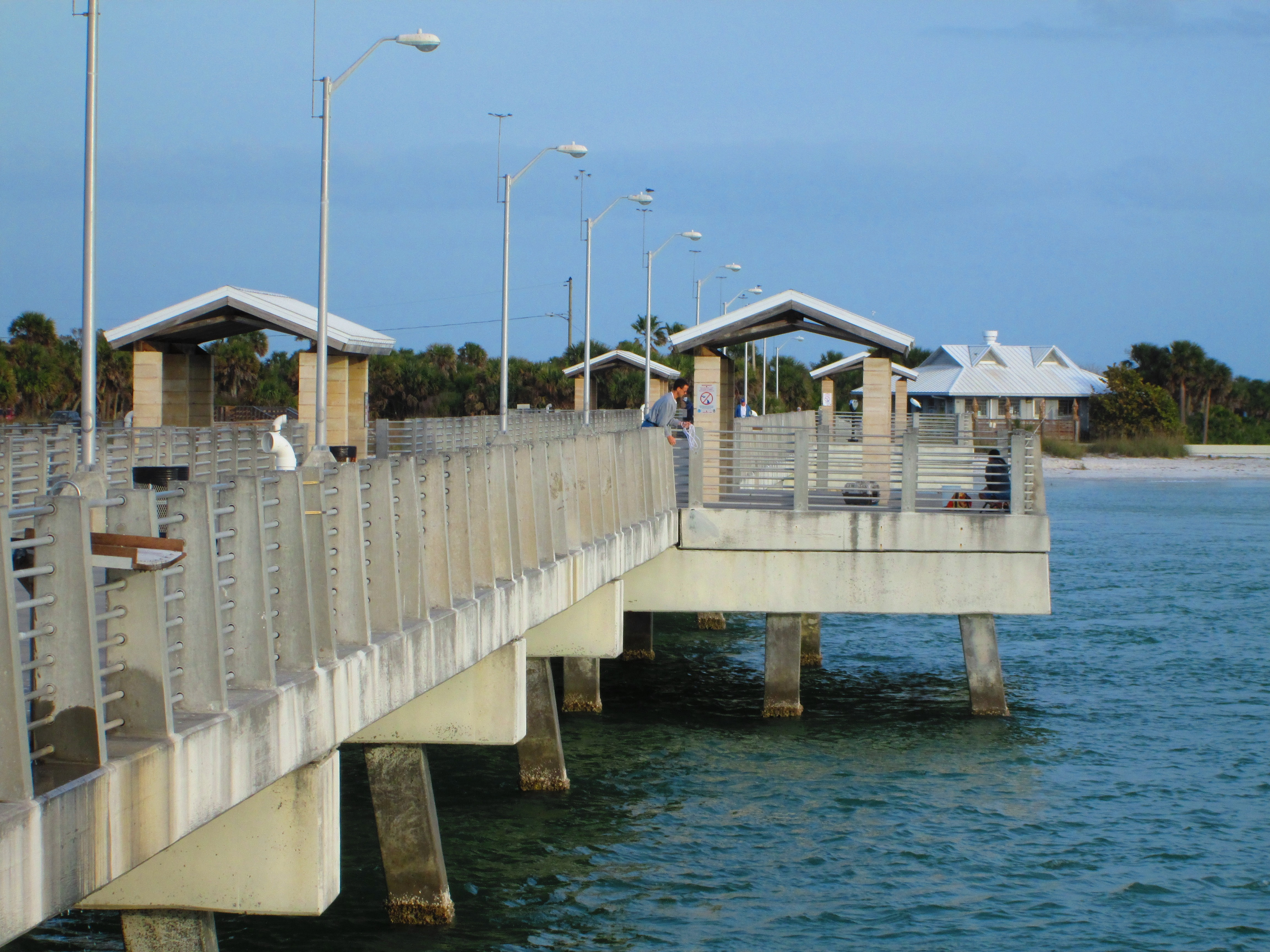
The Gulf Pier at Fort De Soto Park, one of two fishing piers.

In June 1941, the federal government bought back Mullet Key from Pinellas County for $18,404. As planned, It was turned into a sub-post of MacDill Field and used as a bombing range throughout World War II.

=== County park ===
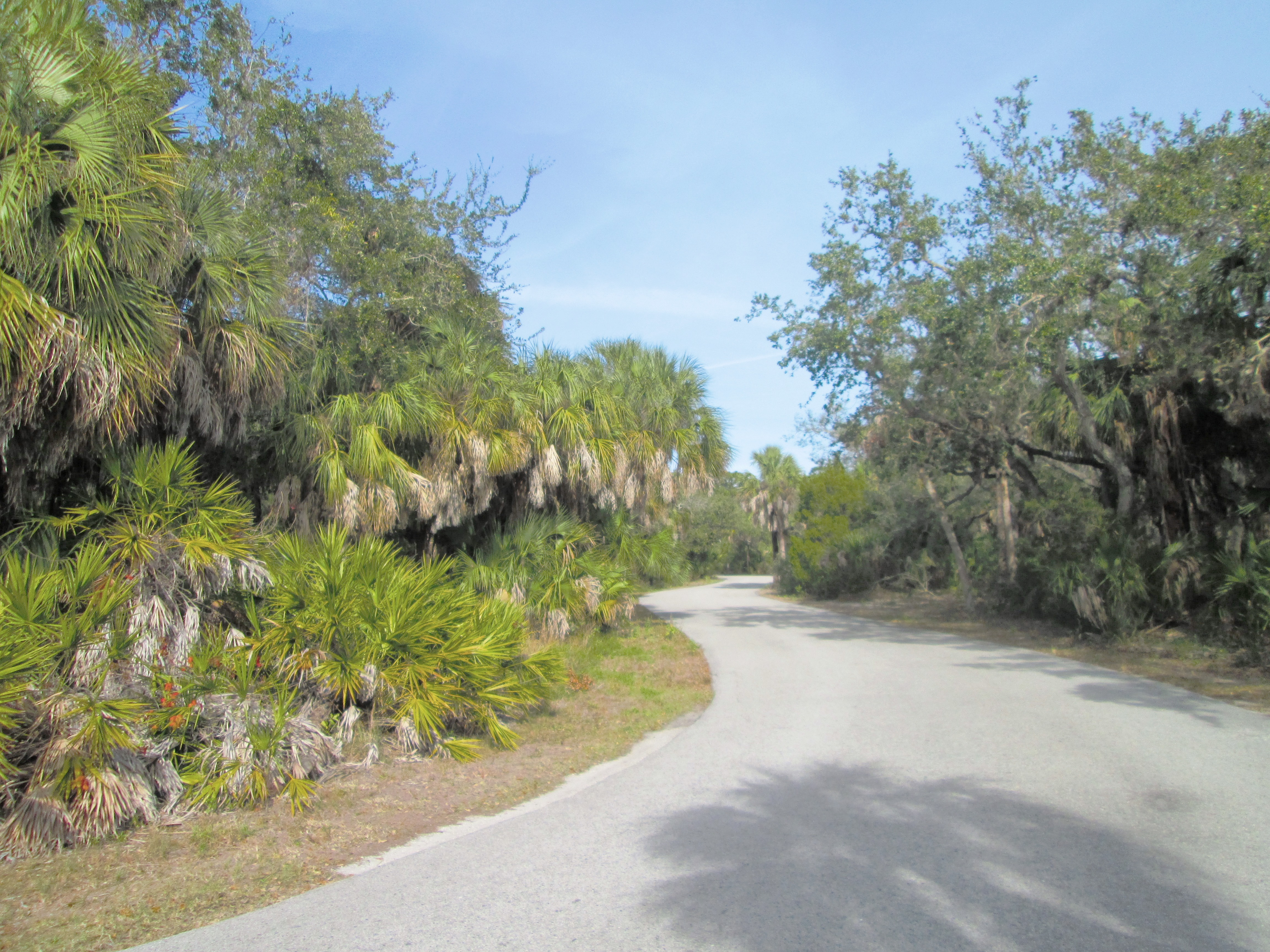
The bike path leading to Arrowhead Fishing and Camping Area.

After World War II, the by then-renamed U.S. Army Air Forces had no need for Mullet Key, and it was a sold back to Pinellas County along with adjacent islands Sister Key, Hospital Key, Rattlesnake Key, and Scratch Key. The sale, for $26,495.54, was finalized in 1948. County officials immediately designated Fort De Soto and all of Mullet Key a county recreational area and declared it open to the public. Soon thereafter excursion passenger boats began regularly scheduled trips to the island.

In 1962, a toll road, the Pinellas Bayway (formerly State Road A19A, now SR 682), was completed to the mainland, enabling island visitors to arrive by car. On December 21, 1962, Fort De Soto Park opened. On May 11, 1963, Fort De Soto Park was officially dedicated. Its facilities have been expanded over the years. The quartermaster storehouse was reconstructed to become the Quartermaster Storehouse Museum. On December 2, 1977, the Fort De Soto batteries were placed on the National Register of Historic Places. The four 12-inch M1890 mortars and two 6-inch Armstrong guns at Fort De Soto are the only weapons of their type remaining in the United States.

==== The Quartermaster Storehouse Museum ====
The Quartermaster Storehouse Museum is a recreation of the original quartermaster storehouse building built between 1900 and 1906, and was duplicated in 1999 using historical photographs, Army engineering condition reports, government documents, and was funded by the Friends of Fort De Soto Inc. and the Pinellas County Parks and Conservation Resources Department. Park staff built the 833-square-foot wooden structure, which contains updated features not found in the original building, including air conditioning, fiber-optic lighting, concealed insulation, and a fire suppression system. In the 1990s, the Pinellas County Parks Department provided a historical interpretation of the military post site, which originally contained 29 buildings, including a hospital, stable, 100-foot-long barrack, guard house, a shop for blacksmiths and carpenters, an administration office, a mess hall, a bake house, and a storehouse, which then gave inspiration to the park staff and volunteers to propose the construction of one of these post buildings. In 1999, the Friends of Fort De Soto received a matching grant from the state Historical Museums Grant-in-Aid Programs to create the museum and its exhibits, and the museum officially opened on November 11, 2000.

Upon entering the museum, visitors are greeted by a mannequin quartermaster in a glass case surrounded by supplies that he would have issued to the soldiers. There are various wall panels that depict local history from the 16th century when Spanish conquistadors encountered the Tocobaga Indians to the Spanish-American War in the 1800s, with the largest wall panel showing photographs of the military post. There are also various display cases that contain recovered artifacts from the park and World War II history, including an original practice bomb, weapons, military badges, and ammunition, as well as other early 20th century items, such as a woman’s dress, a deck of playing cards, and a rattlesnake skin. There is also an interactive touch-screen device disguised as a box of military supplies in which visitors can explore additional information, images, narration, and historical film clips, specifically highlighting the 12-inch mortars that were once fired at Battery Laidley and have been designated by the National Register of Historic Places.

== Recreational activities and amenities ==
The park is open year-round and has the following features:

- Several thousand acres of firm-bottomed shallows, making the area a favored destination of wading anglers
- Two piers, each allowing fishing. Both have bait, tackle and food concessions.
- Various picnic areas.
- Fort De Soto, built in 1898, abandoned in phases 1910 to 1948.
- Quartermaster Storehouse Museum.
- Two swimming areas, North Beach and East Beach. North Beach has been named to "America's Top 10 Beaches" list by Dr. Beach numerous times. In 2005 it moved to the first place in this list, being recognized as America's Best Beach.
- 800-foot boat ramp.
- Camping area with a camp store, modern restrooms, laundry room, and a multipurpose game room.
- Snack bar with gift shop at the old fort.
- Seven-mile multi-purpose trail.
- Bike lane all the way down the bayway with two lanes.
- 2¼ mile canoe trail.
- Barrier-free nature trail.
- Paw Playground, an area to exercise pets.
- Ferry to Egmont Key, site of Egmont Key State Park.

== Geology ==
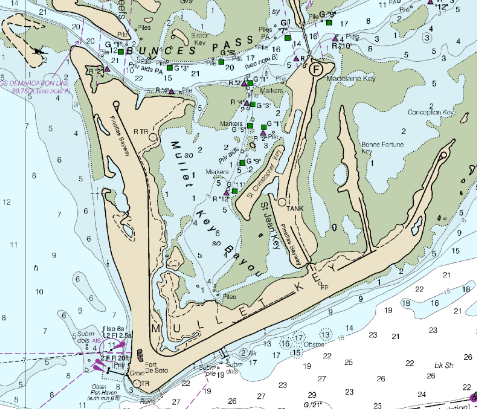
Chart of Mullet Key and the other islands in Fort De Soto Park

Mullet Key is a barrier island. It is unusual for a barrier island in that it has two arms which are joined at a right angle. One arm faces the Gulf of Mexico, running from the Tampa Bay entrance channel north to Bunces Pass. This arm of the island is wave-dominated, that is, formed primarily by energy from waves approaching the island. The other arm of the island faces the entrance channel to Tampa Bay, and is tidal-dominated, that is, formed by energy from the tidal flow along the entrance channel.

Because waves and currents, and the occasional storm, are constantly reworking the sand that makes up a barrier island, the shape and area of Mullet Key varies over time. The five islands of the park, Mullet Key, Bonne Fortune Key, Madelaine Key, St. Christopher Key, and St. Jean Key, had a total land area of 970 acres (390 ha) in 1970, and of 1,140 acres (460 ha) in 2014.

=== South Bunces Key ===
A shoal off the north end of Mullet Key emerged as a new barrier island in the late 1970s. It was named South Bunces Key, and rapidly grew in size and became vegetated. The new island became attached to Mullet key at both ends. Storms eroded South Bunces Key in the early 21st century, with the remnants of the island merging with Mullet Key. South Bunces Key disappeared by 2016, and the part of Mullet Key that was landward of South Bunces Key was being eroded. A new shoal in a similar location, named Outback key, has formed in the past 5 years and recently connected to the main body of Mullet Key.

== Ecology ==
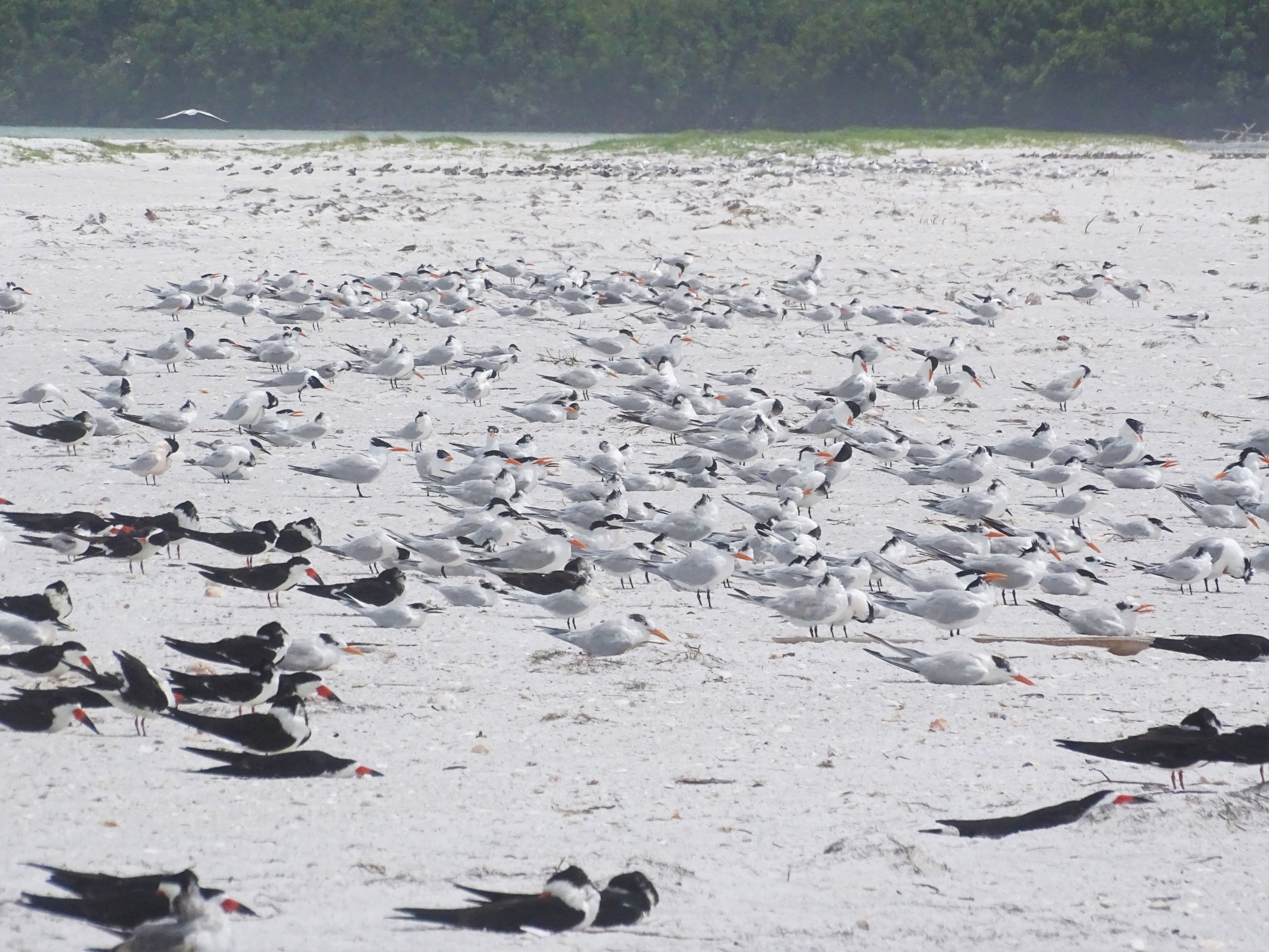
Protected shorebird staging area on the North Beach, including black skimmers, royal terns, sandwich terns, ruddy turnstones, and black-bellied plovers.

Fort De Soto Park is a hub for biodiversity, featuring various ecosystems such as mangroves and hammocks. Over 328 species of birds have been documented at the park, with large areas of the North Beach protected for both the nesting of breeding birds, and the stopover of migratory birds. However, due to factors such as habitat loss and increased abundance of the brown-headed cowbird (a brood parasite), species such as the mangrove cuckoo, black-whiskered vireo, and prairie warbler no longer breed in this location.

As with many beach habitats in the region, also breeding in this park are endangered loggerhead sea turtles.

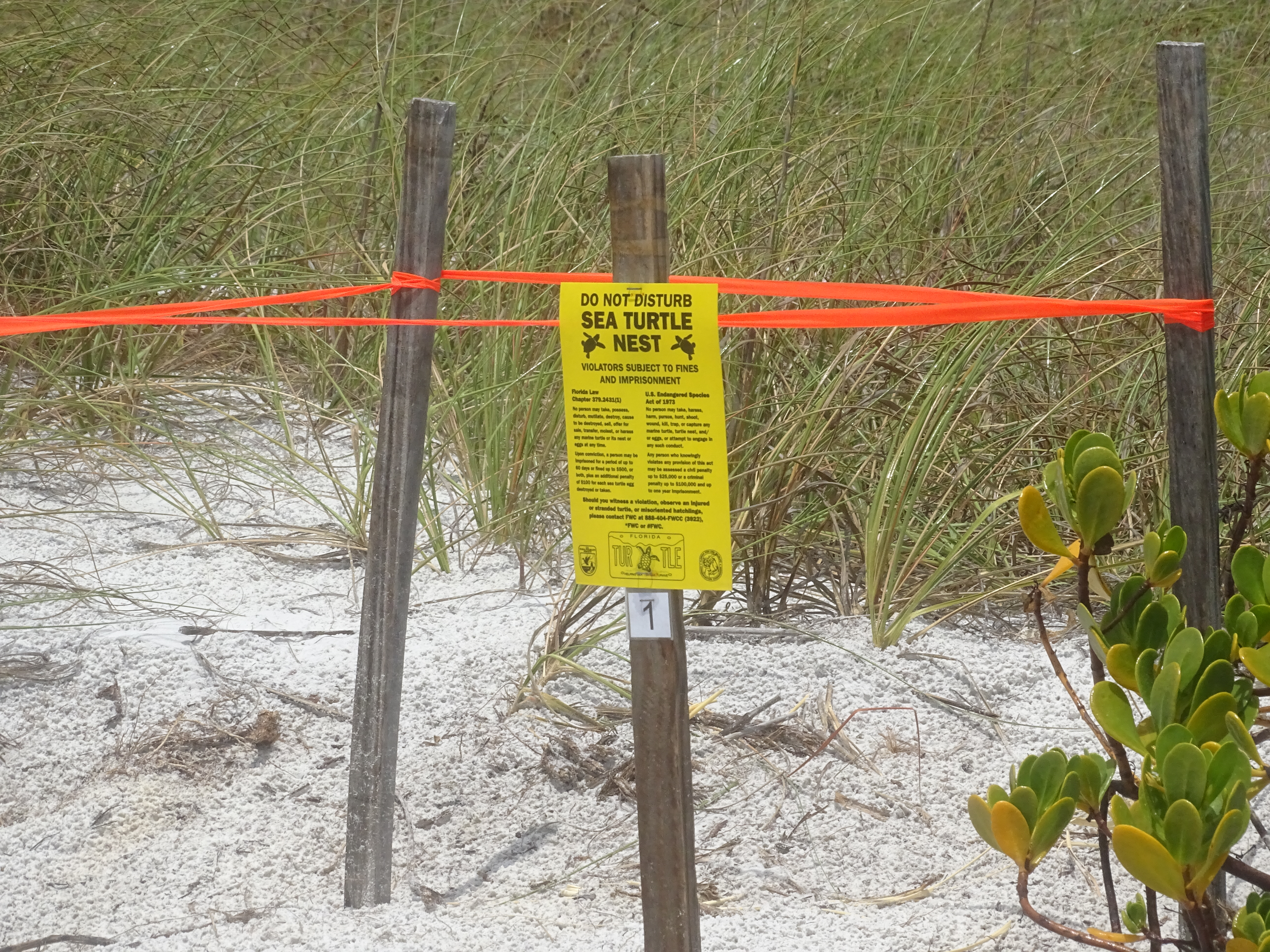
Designated sea turtle nesting site on the North Beach.

Australian pines (Casuarina species) were introduced into Florida after 1890 to serve as windbreaks. The species are tolerant of salt-spray and poor soil, and have invaded many plant communities, suppressing the growth of native species. However, the trees are shallow-rooted and subject to uprooting in wind storms. In addition, stands of Australian pines on beaches have replaced deep-rooted plants, exposing beaches to erosion. The root systems also interfere with sea turtles digging nests above the high water mark on beaches. Australian pines are now considered an invasive pest, and have been generally banned in Florida Australian pines were well established on the islands in Fort De Soto Park. Removal of all Australian pines from the park is not considered feasible, but park management intended to reduce the number of trees. As of 2014, the park planned to remove about ten percent of the Australian pines in the park each year, starting with those closest to the shoreline. The Florida Fish and Wildlife Conservation Commission (FWC) began removing Australian pines from North Beach in the park in 2015.

== Gallery ==
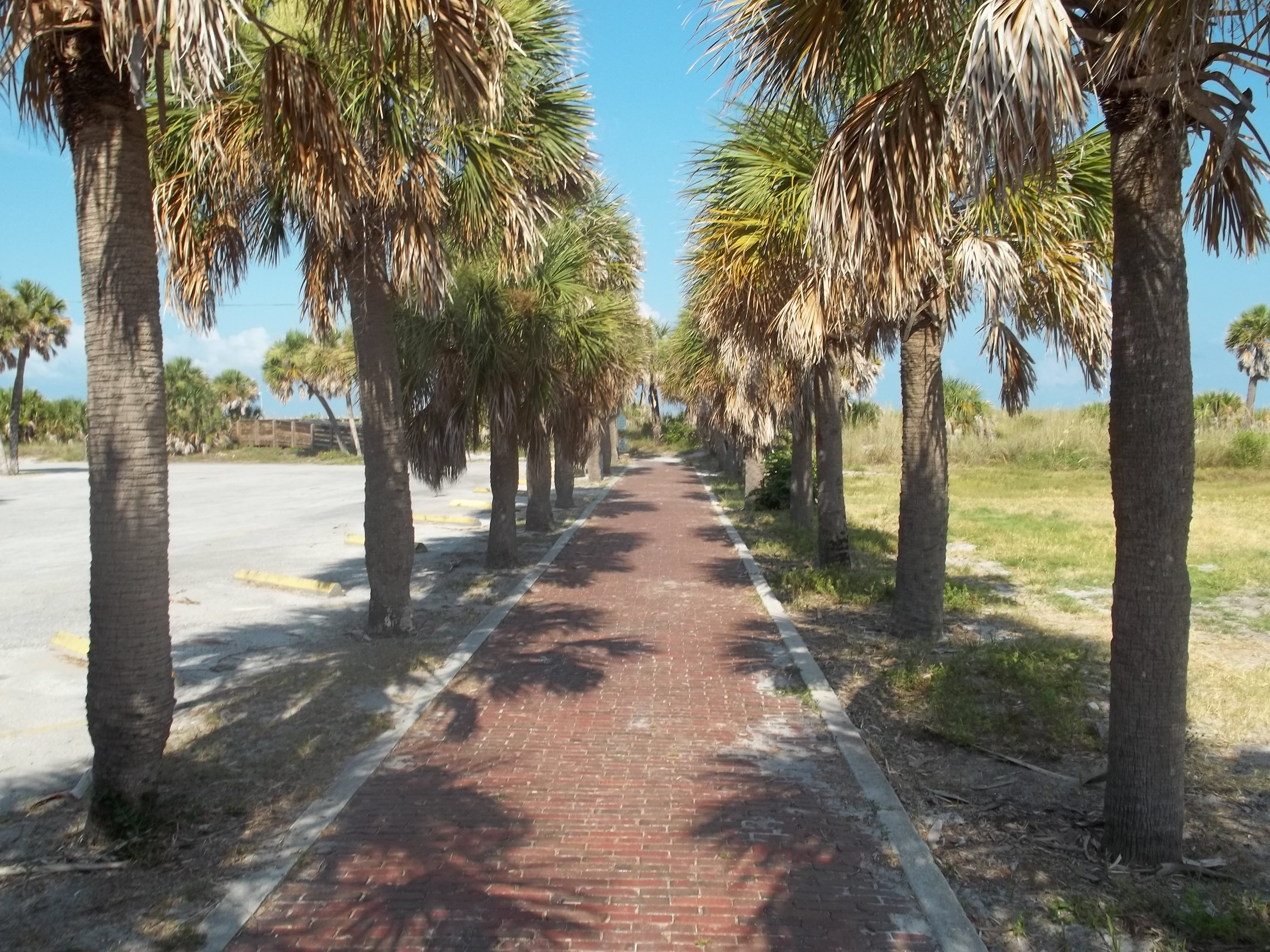
A walkway next to the Historic Fort

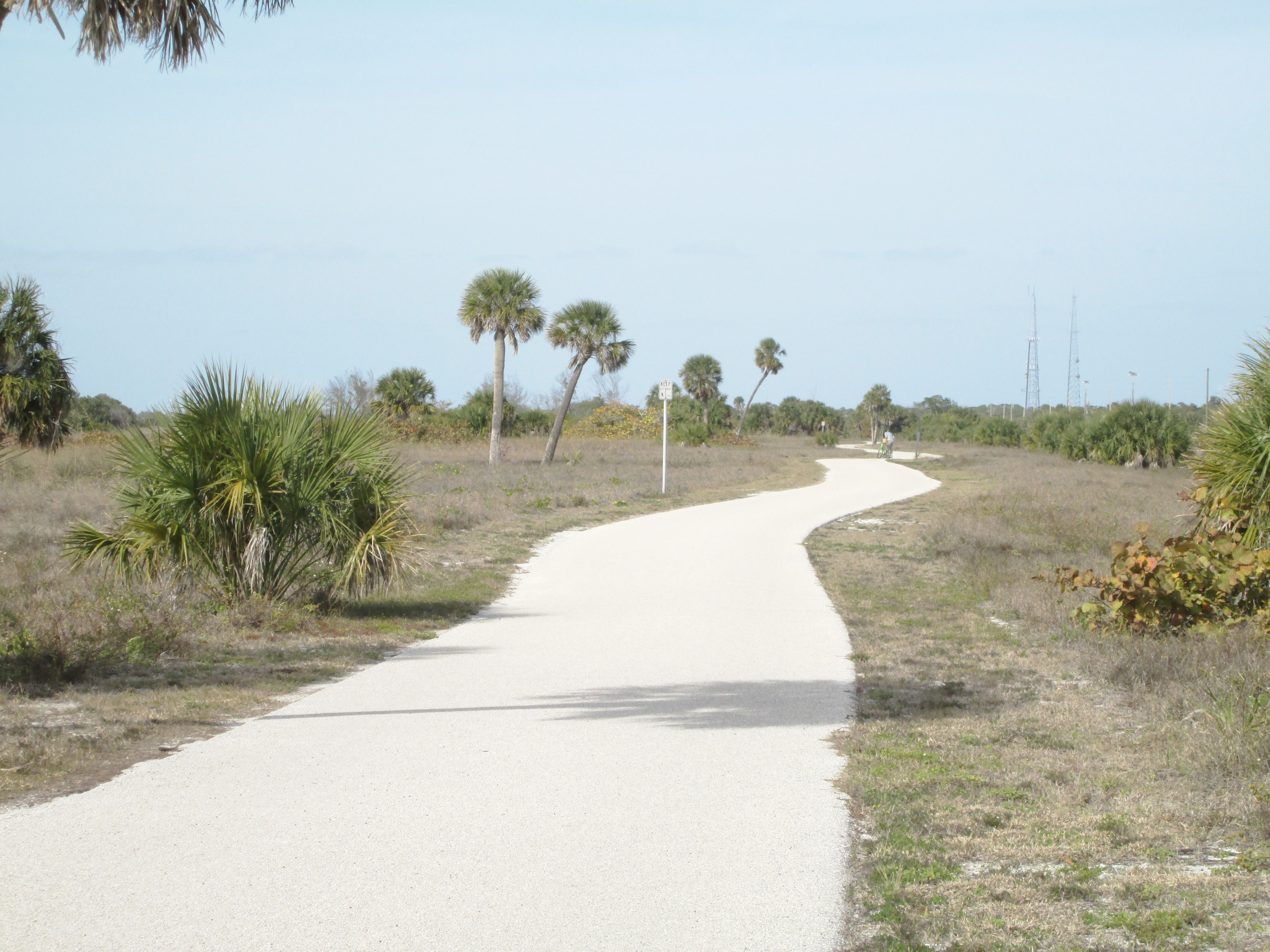
The main bike path to North Beach

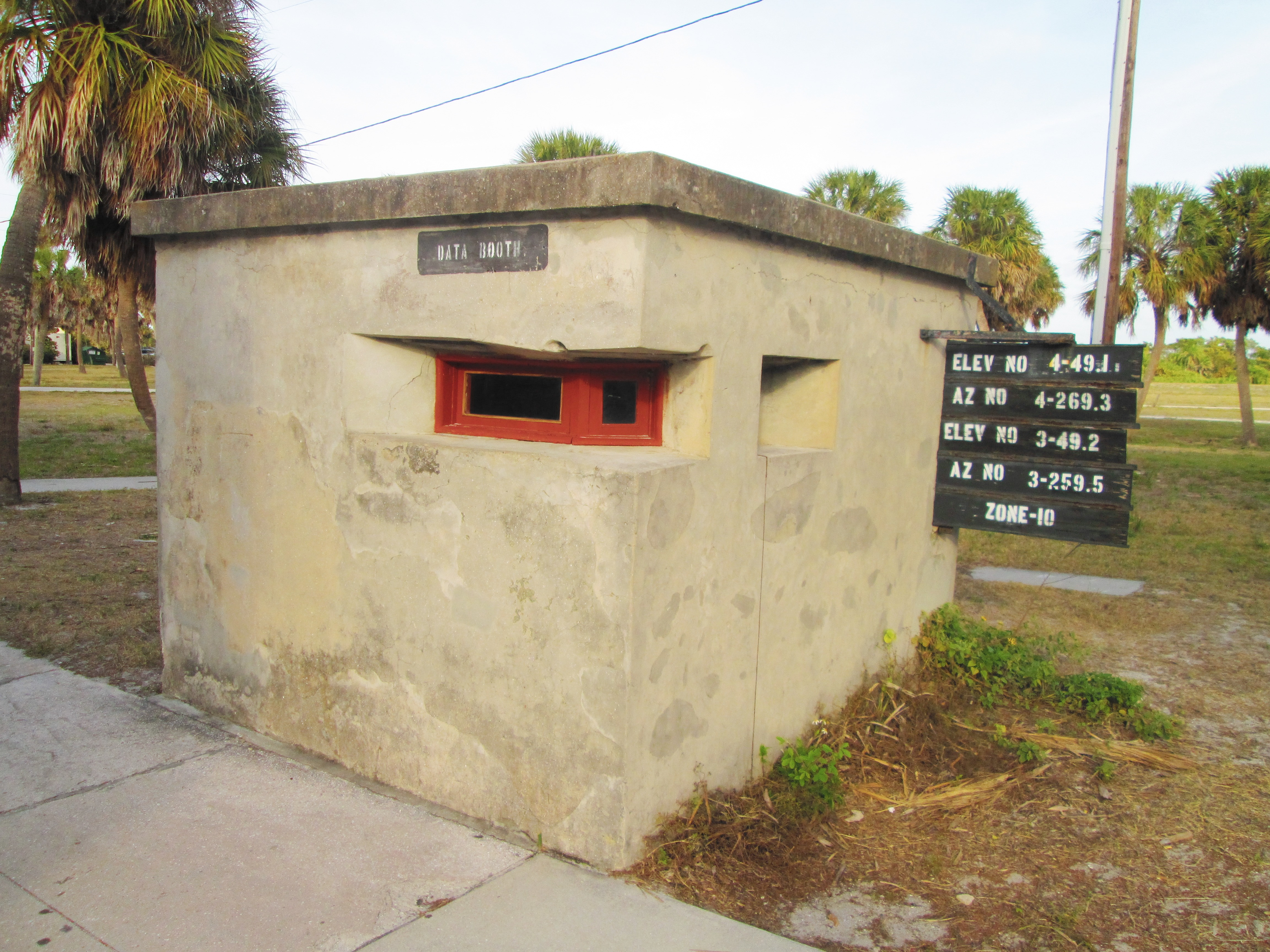
A "data booth" used to relay elevations and azimuths from observers to mortar crews

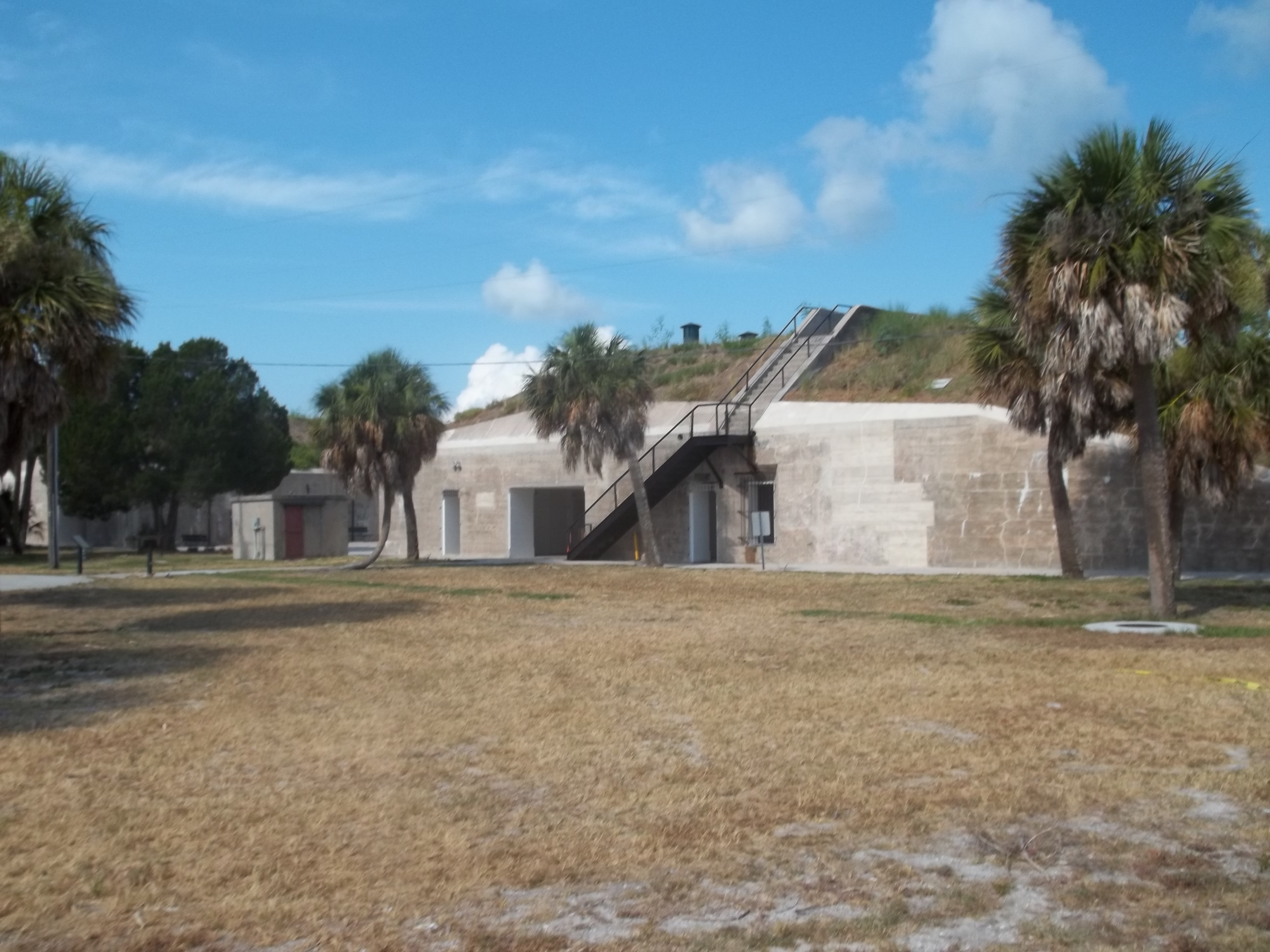
The fortification for Battery Laidley; the data booth is on the left

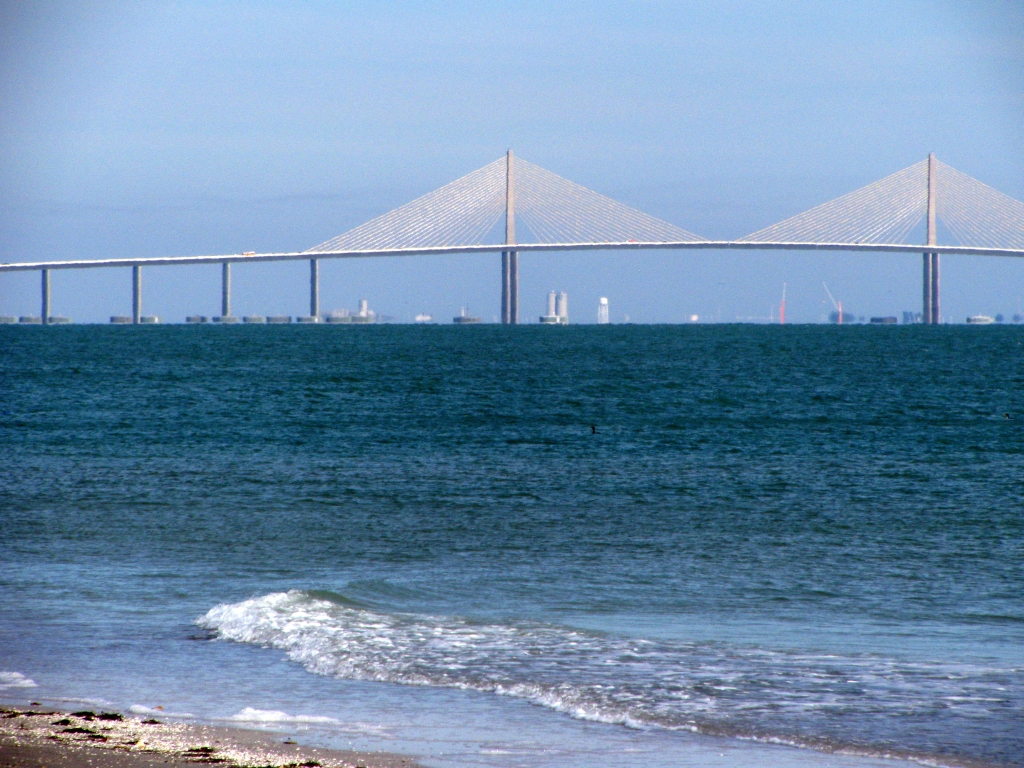
A view of the Sunshine Skyway Bridge from Fort De Soto

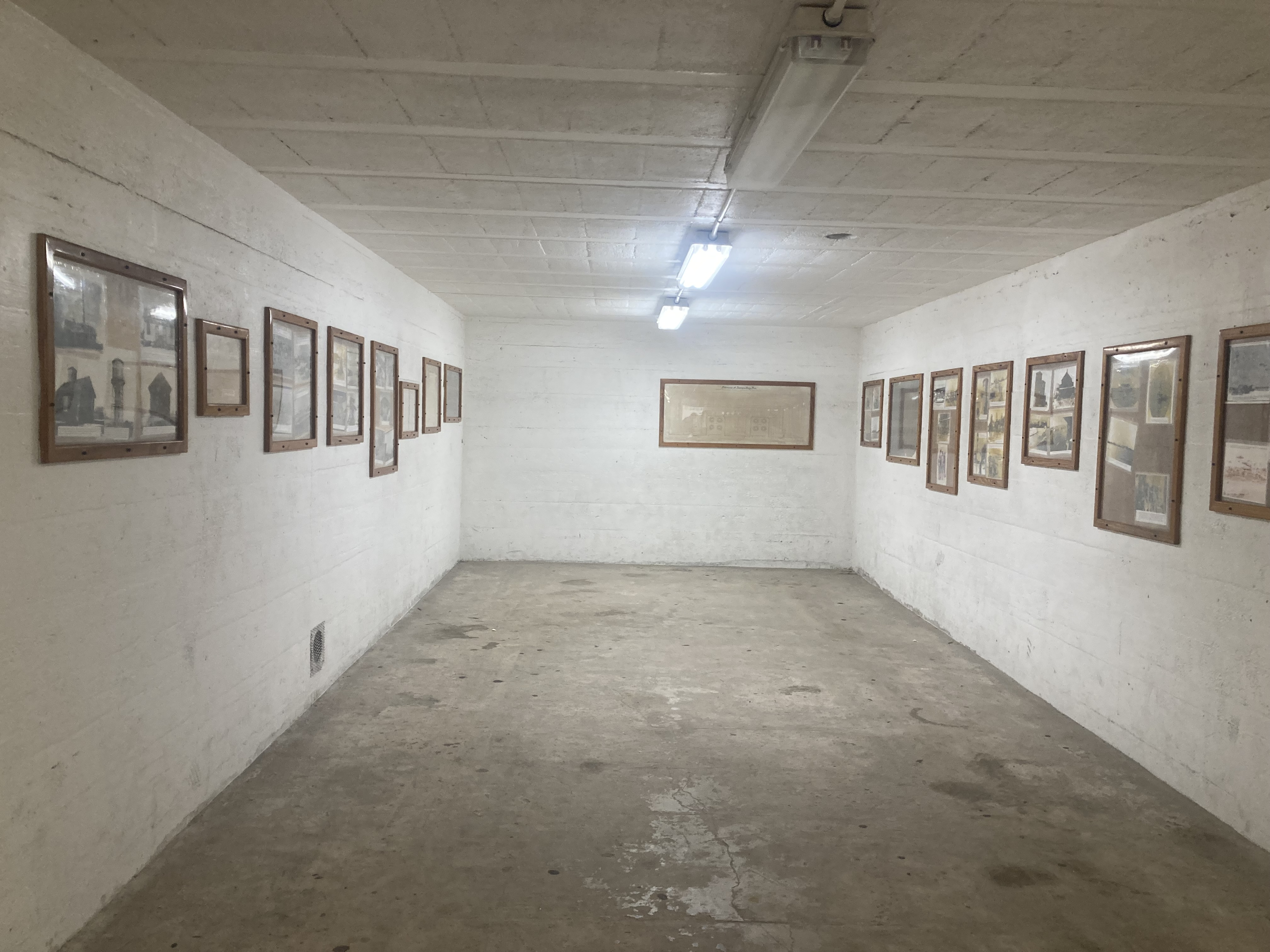
Fort De Soto Historic Photograph Gallery

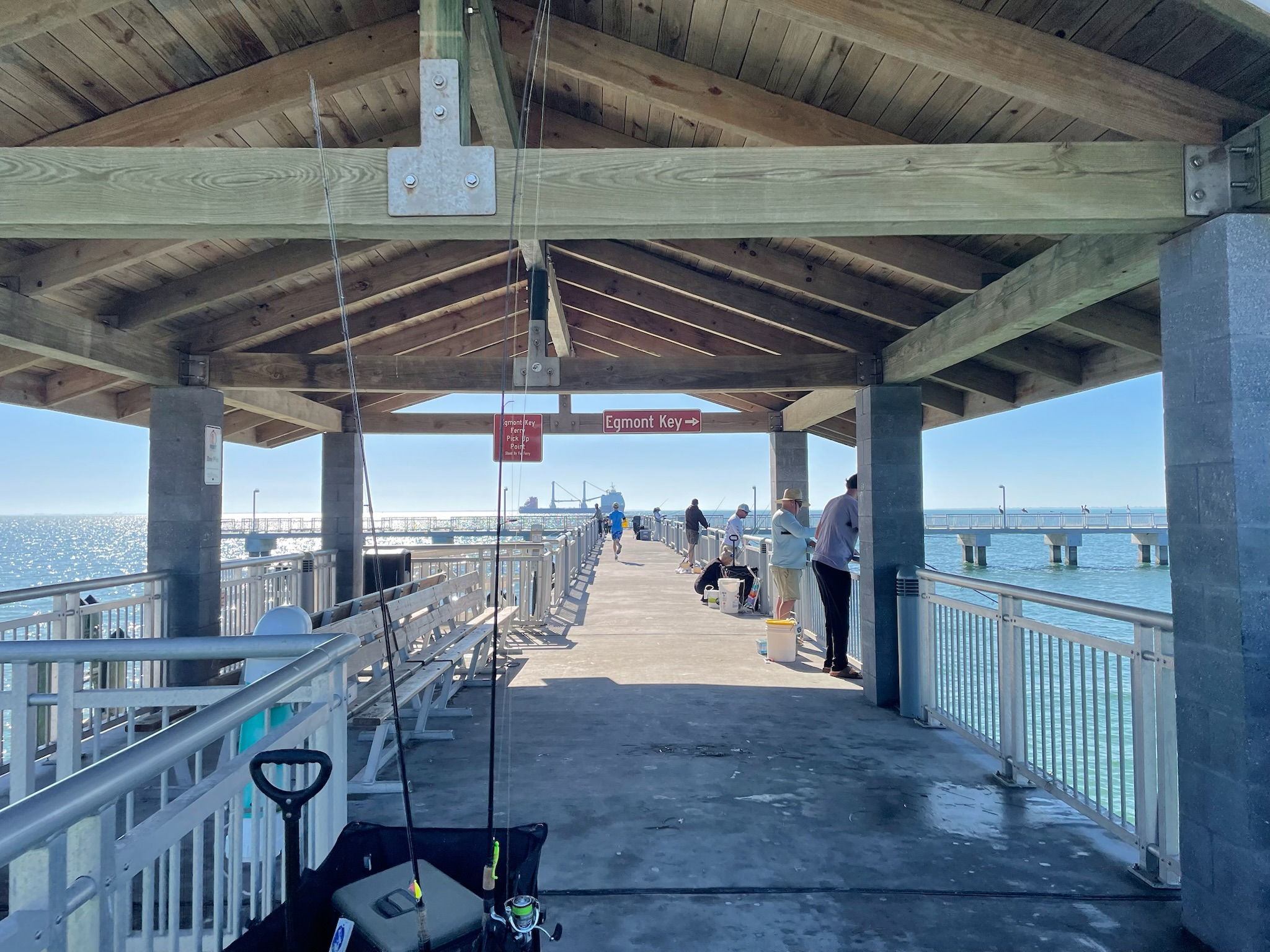
Fort Desoto Bayway Fishing Pier
Birds of Fort De Soto Park

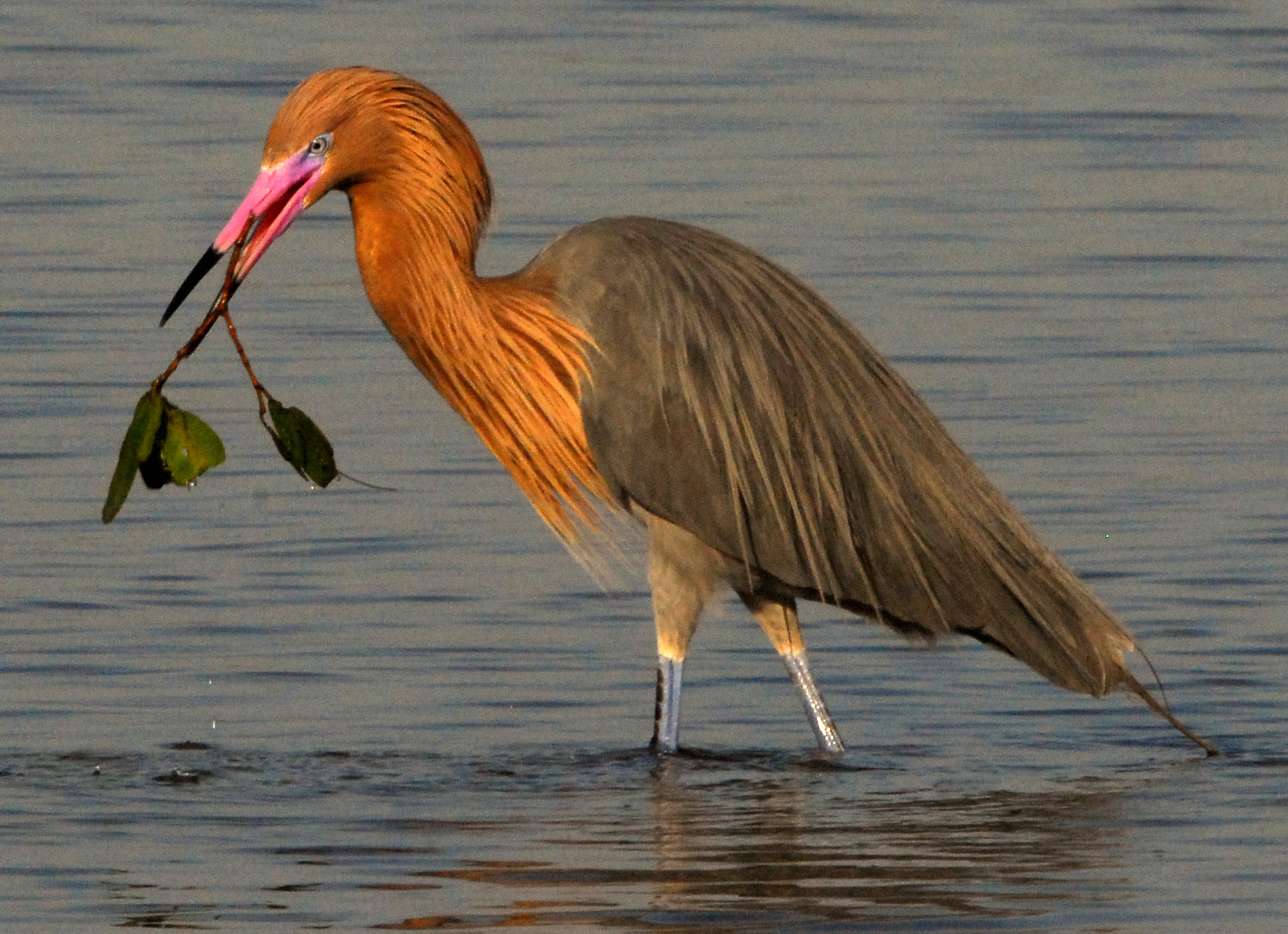
Reddish egret
(Egretta rufescens)

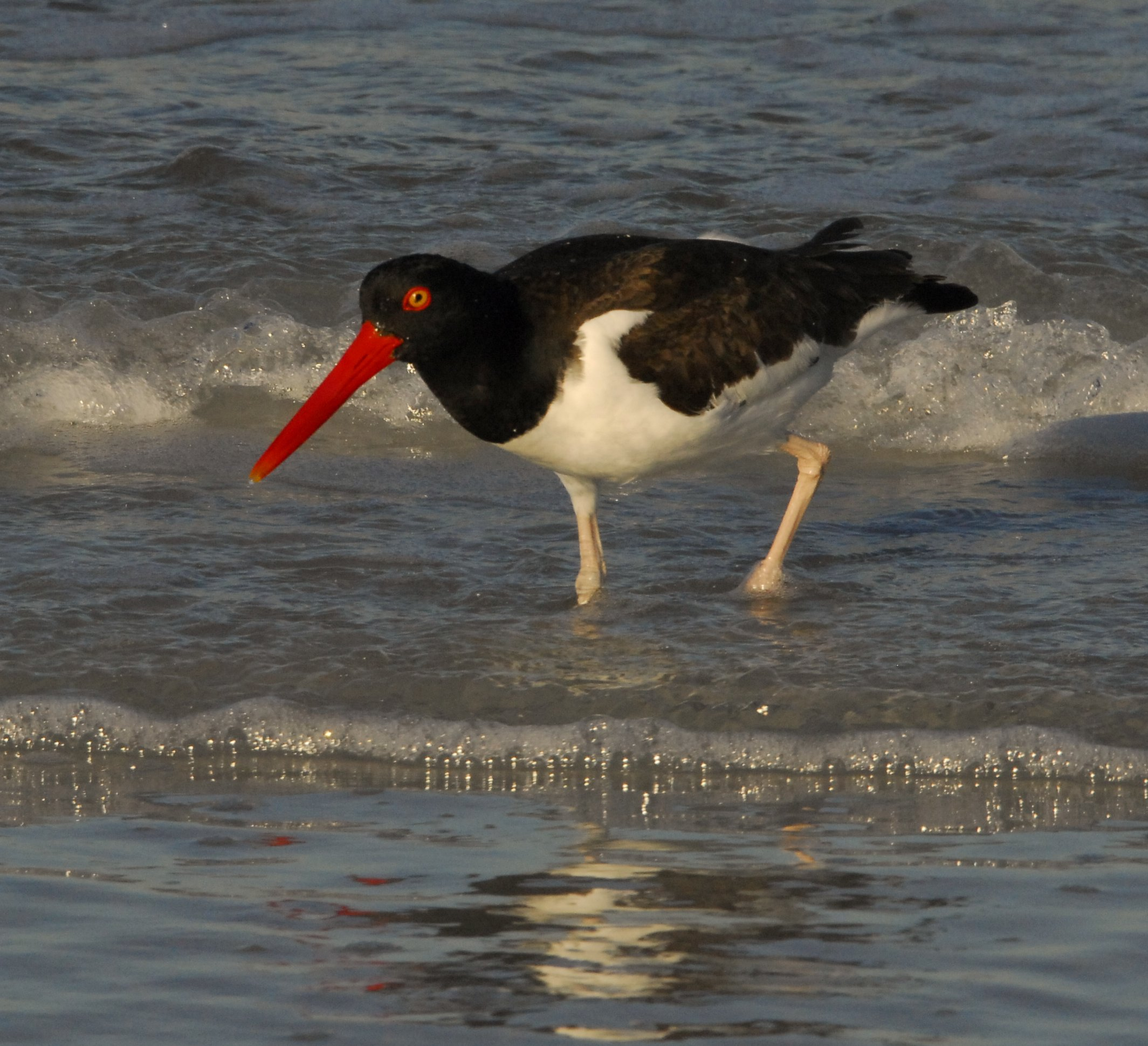
American oystercatcher
(Haematopus palliatus)

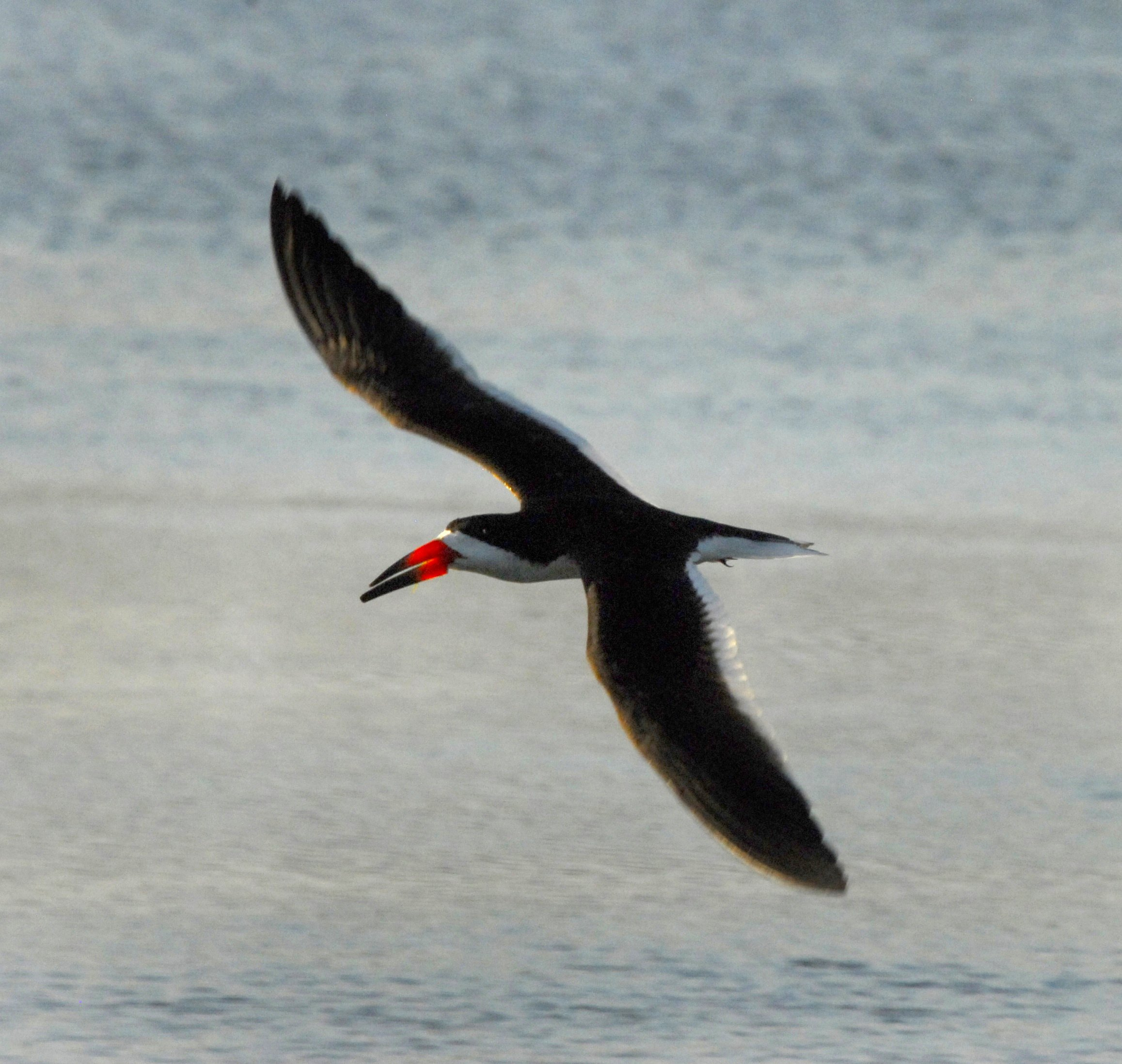
Black skimmer
(Rynchops niger)

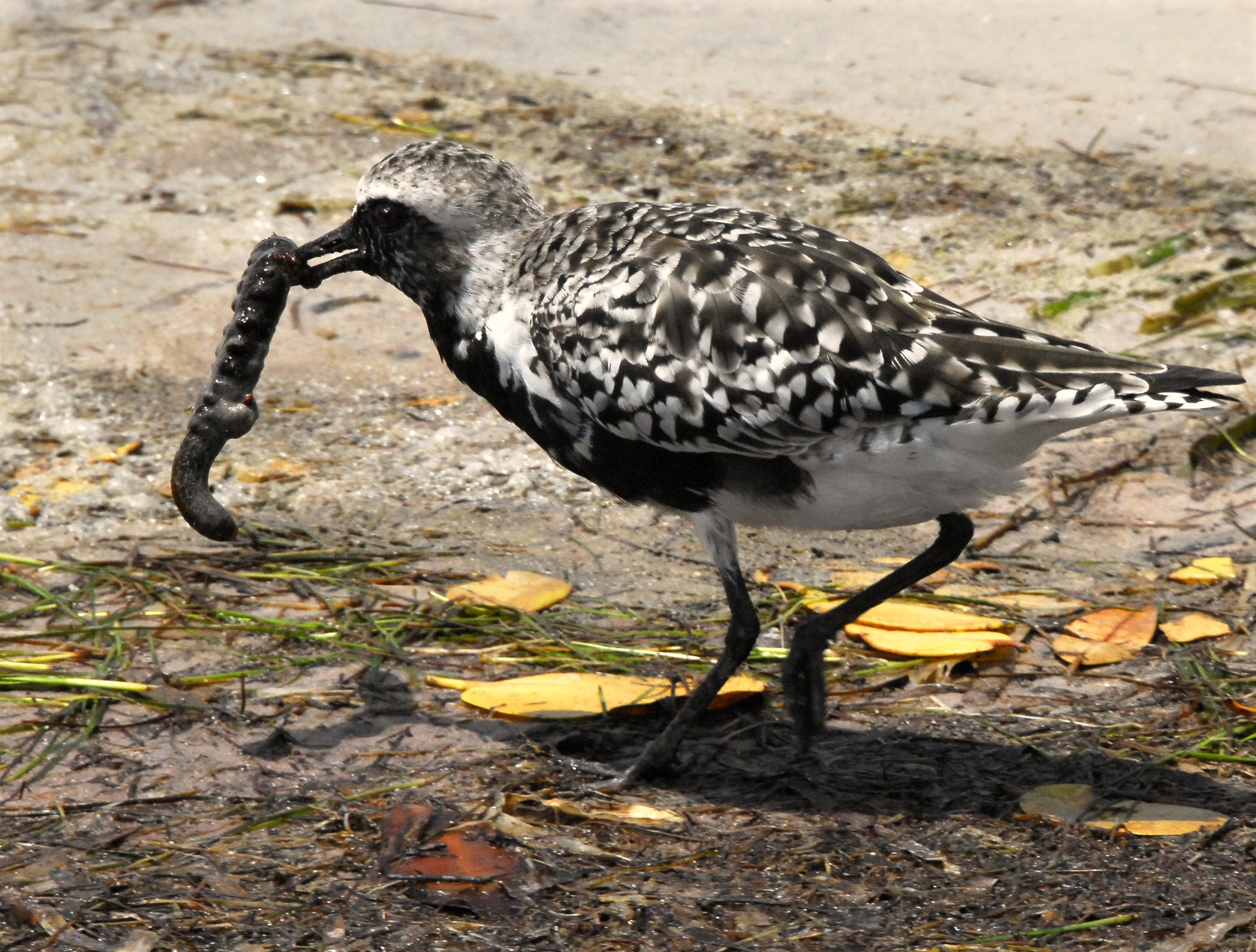
Black-bellied plover
(Pluvialis squatarola)

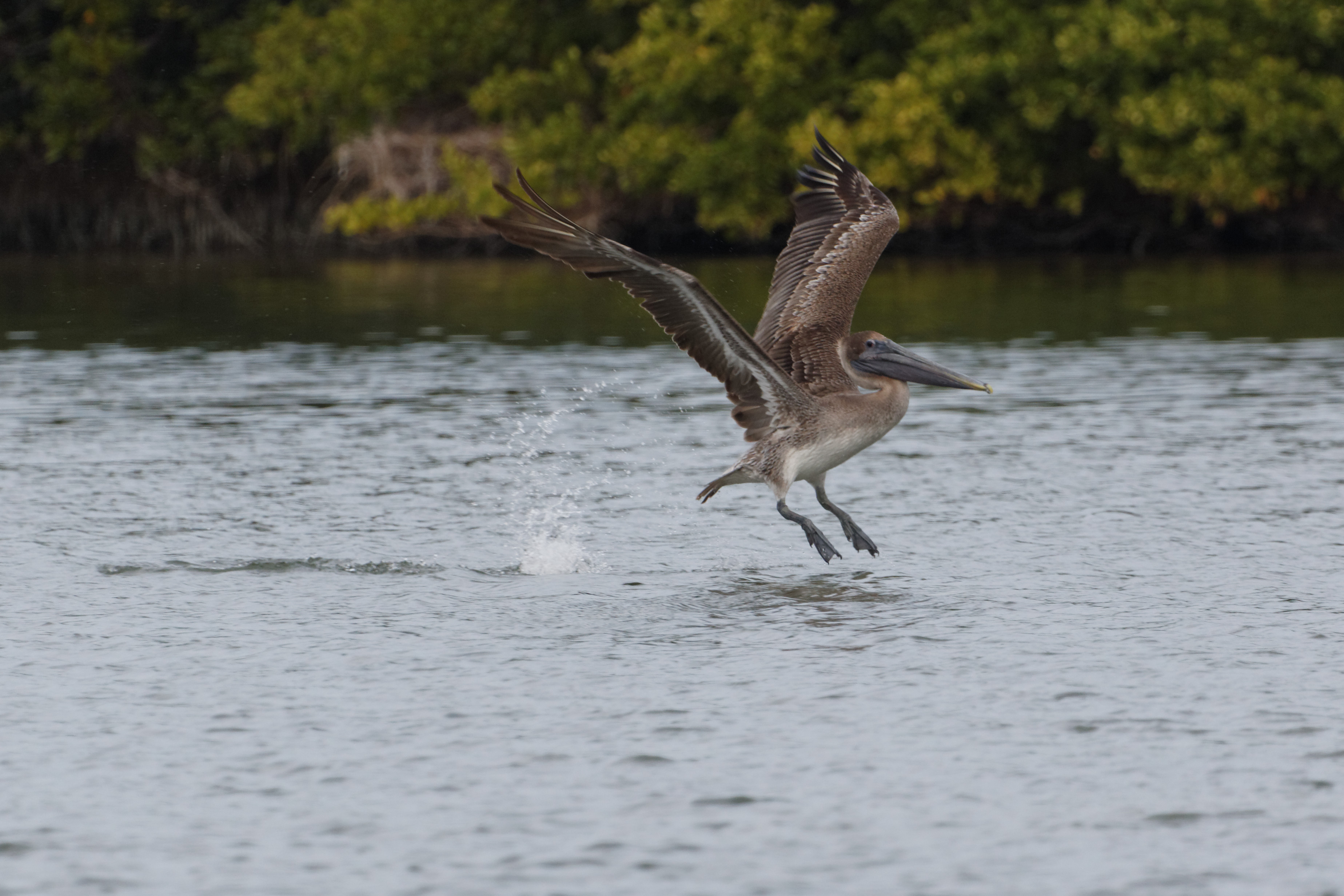
Brown pelican
(Pelecanus occidentalis)

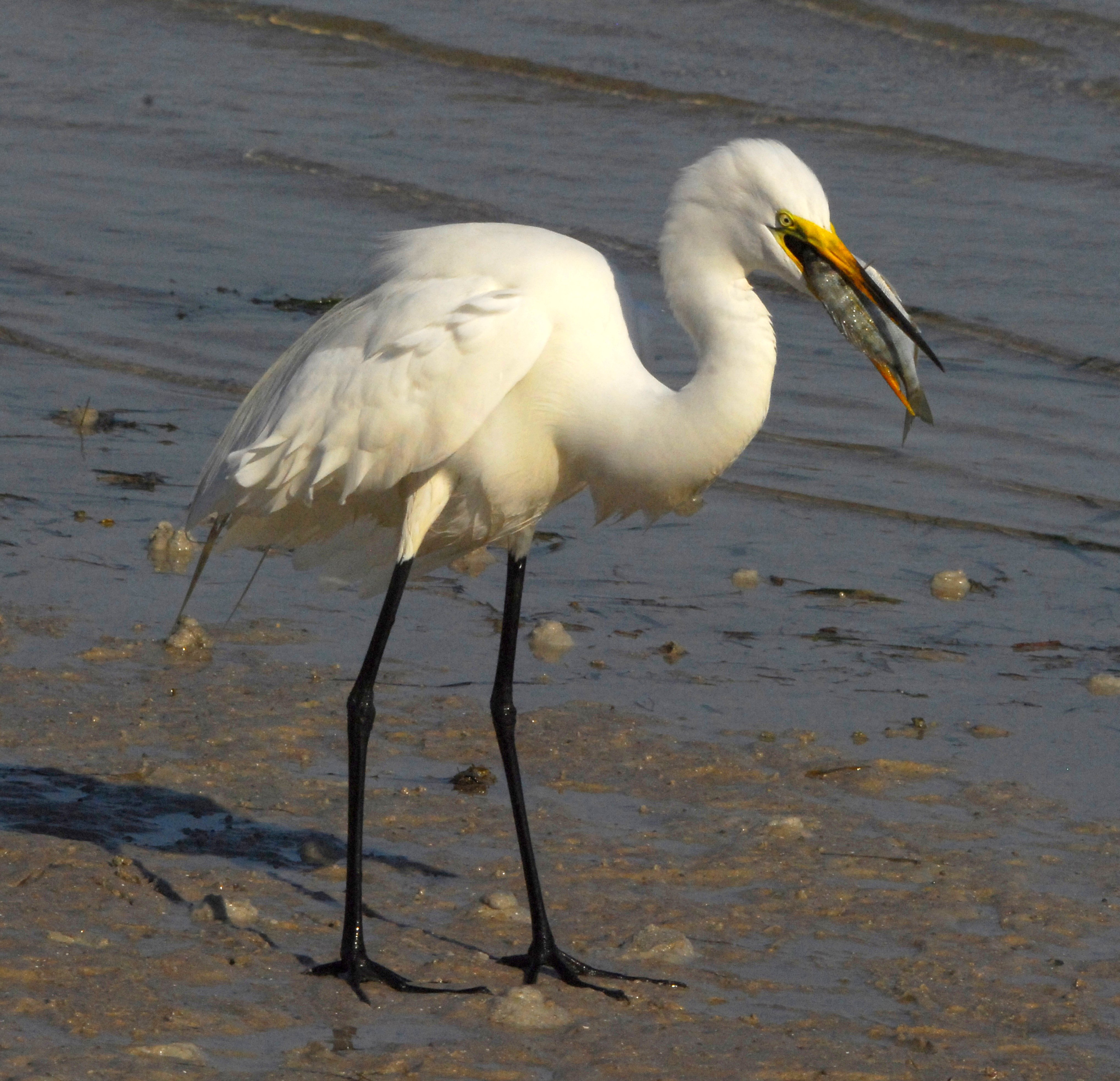
Great egret
(Ardea alba)

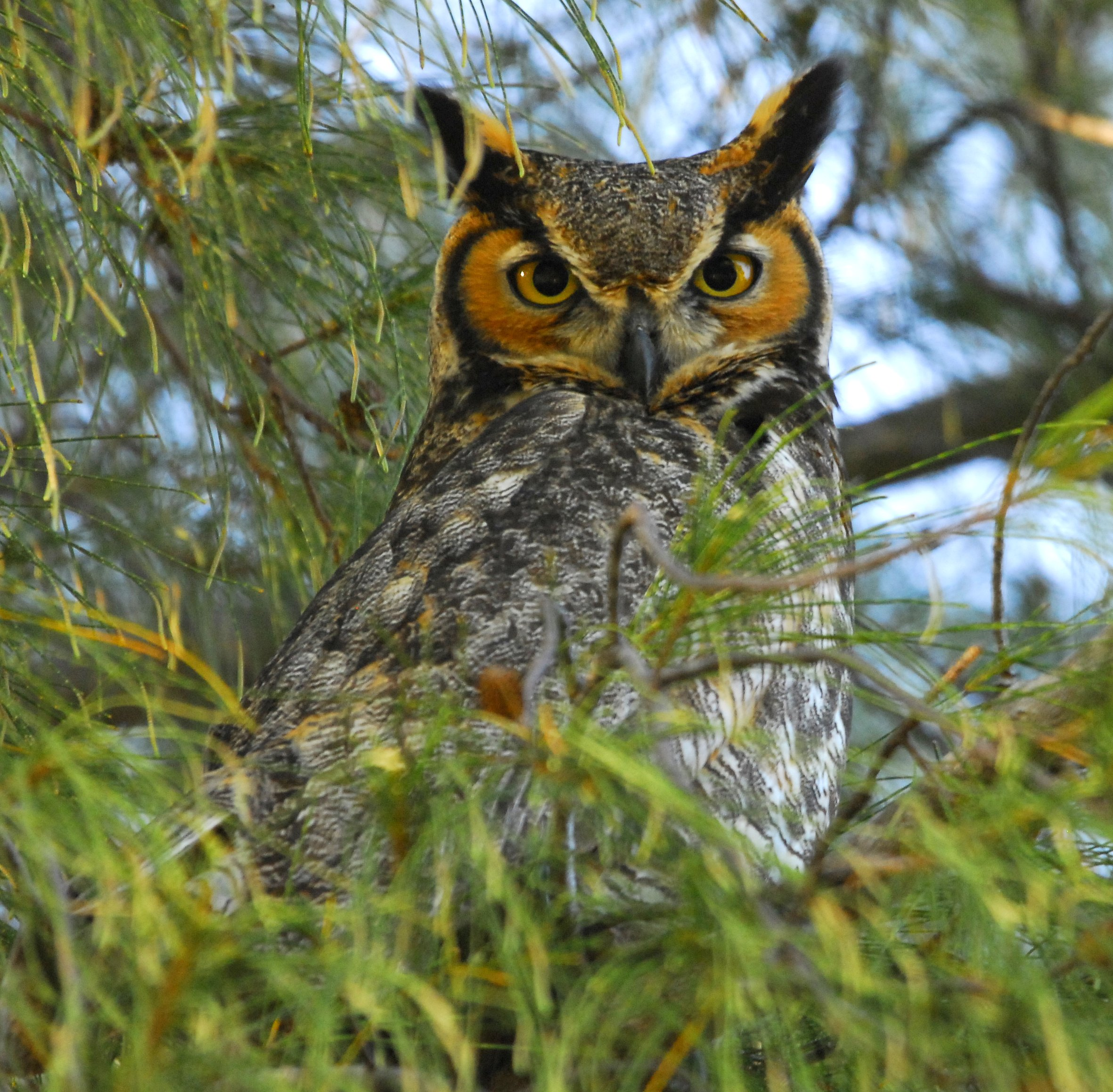
Great horned owl
(Bubo virginianus)

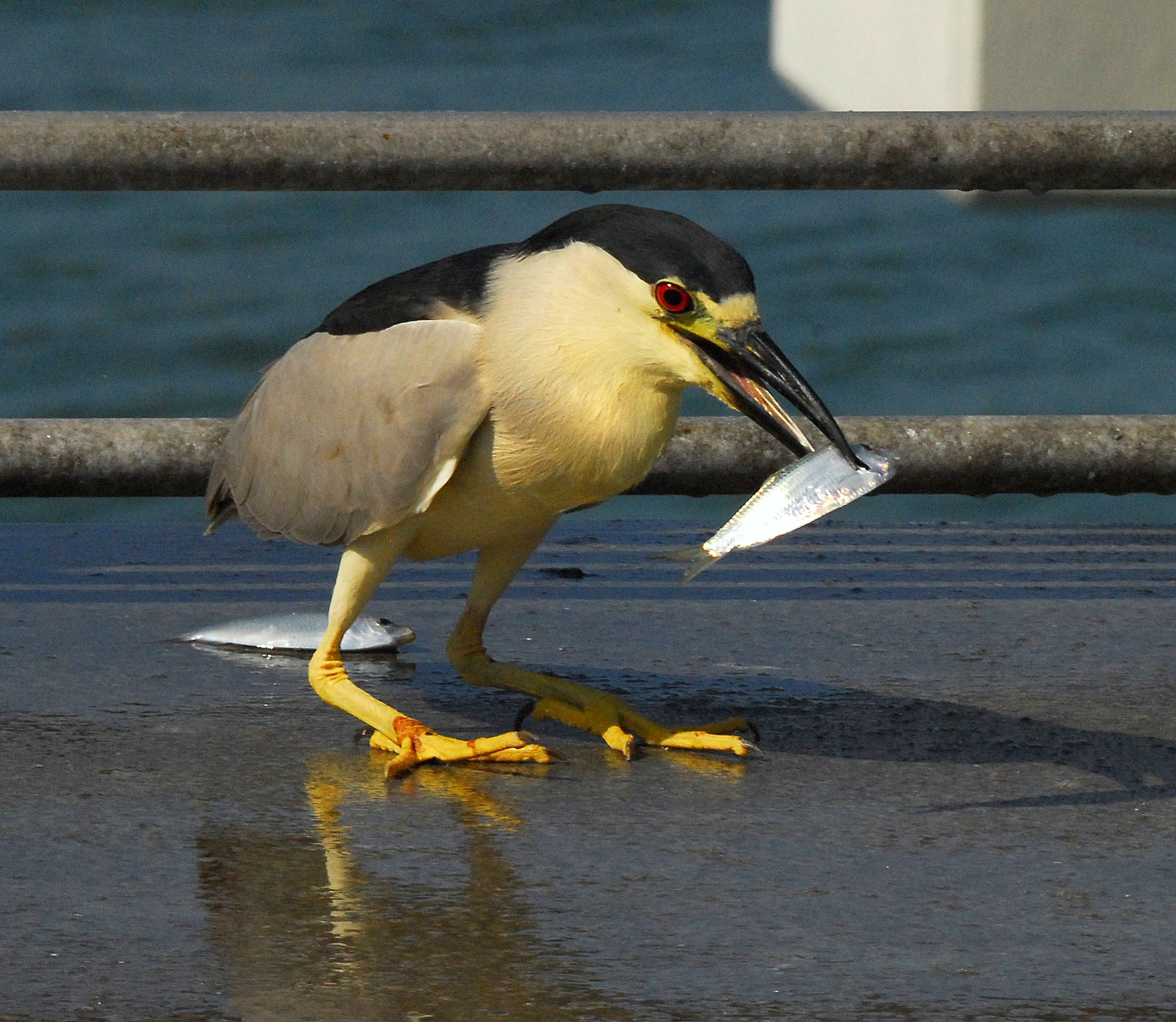
Black-crowned night heron
(Nycticorax nycticorax)

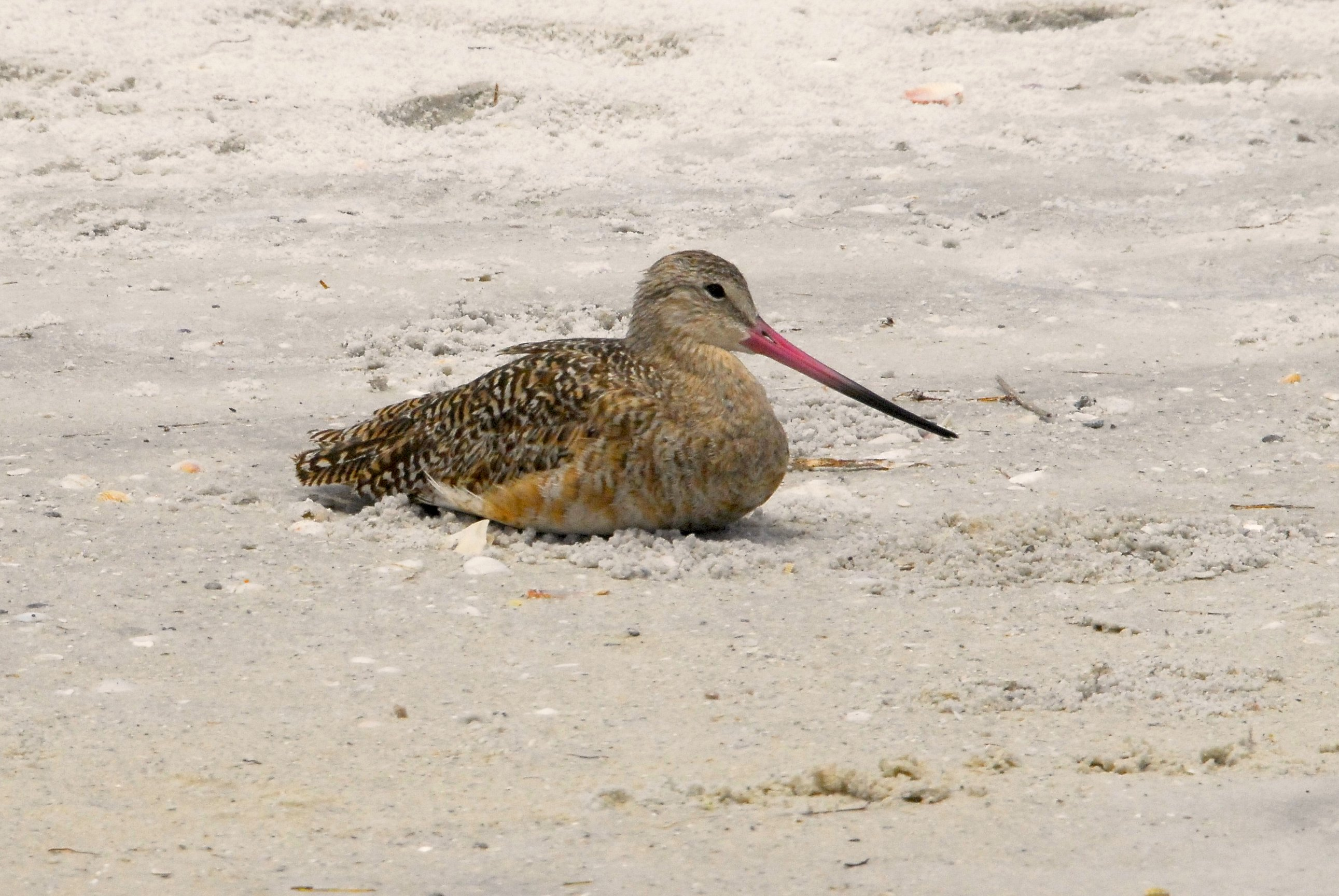
Marbled godwit
(Limosa fedoa)

== See also ==
- Seacoast defense in the United States

== Sources ==
- Addeo, Alicia; Moore, Bart (June 1, 1990). "Crossbows to Bombers: The Military History of Mullet Key". Tampa Bay History. 12 (1) 3 – via University of South Florida Scholar Commons.
- Collins, Jennifer; Middlekauff, Byron; Paxton, Charles (2014). "Fort De Soto Park and Mullet Key: Beach Processes, Management, and History". The Florida Geographer. 45: 63–79.
- Davis, Richard A. Jr. (2016). Barrier Islands of the Florida Gulf Coast Peninsula. Sarasota, Florida: Pineapple Press. ISBN 978-1-56164-8085.
