= Kaunaʻoa Bay =

Bay in Hawaii County, Hawaii, United States of America

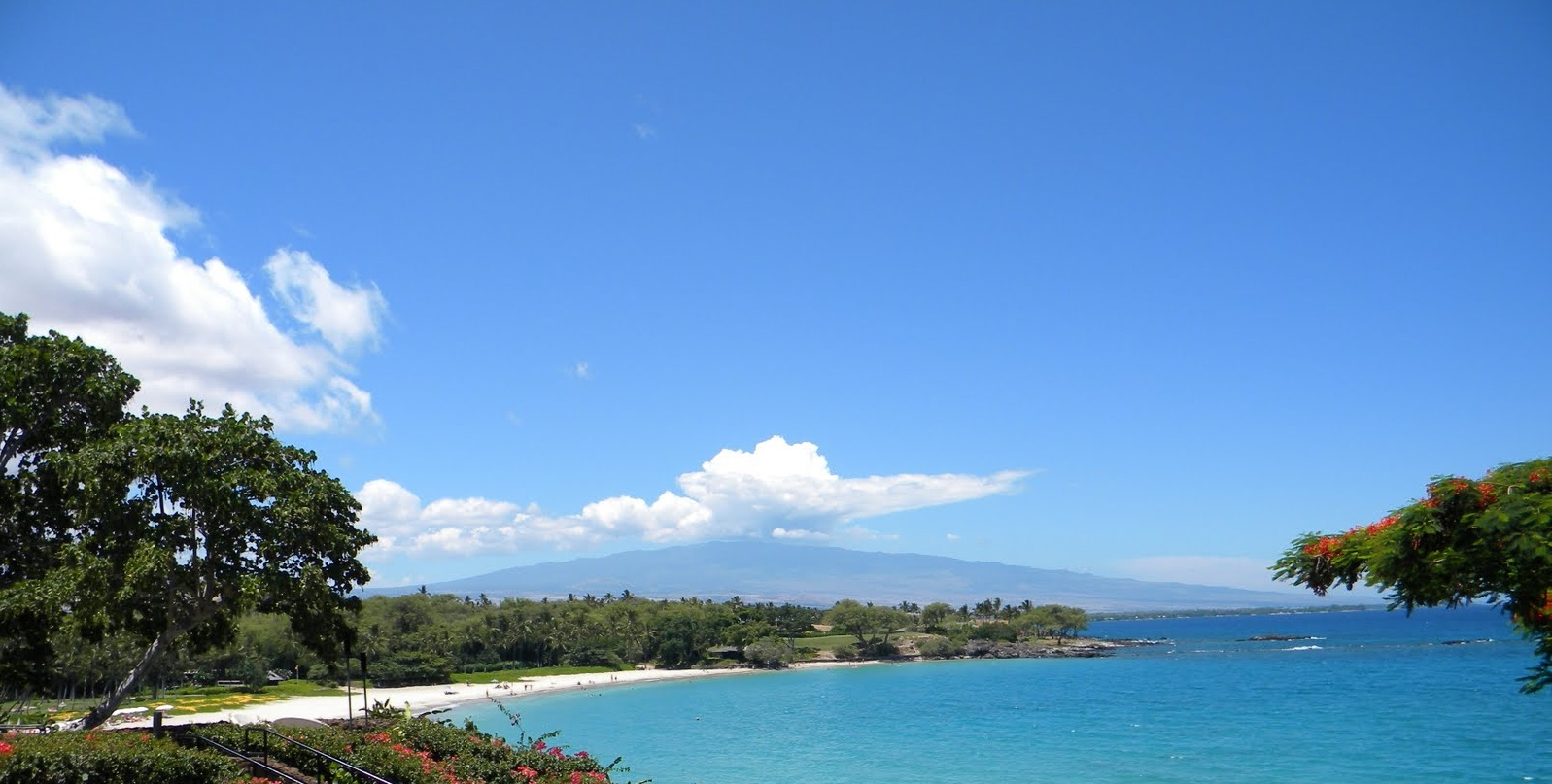
Kaunaʻoa Bay and Beach, with Hualālai in the background

Kaunaʻoa Bay has one of the few white sand beaches of the Kohala Coast, the western side of the island of Hawaiʻi. A historic hotel, the Mauna Kea Beach Hotel, is located on beautiful Kauna'oa.

== Description ==
The word kaunaʻoa may refer to a few different things, any of which may have been why native Hawaiians named this beach so: the first definition refers to a thin, orange vine with yellow flowers (Cuscuta sandwichiana), which is found throughout most of Hawaiʻi (this is the official lei vine of Lānaʻi). However, the second definition refers to a mollusk (Vermetidae), and a third definition refers to a tough seaweed (Galaxaura rugosa).

The bay is accessed via Mauna Kea Beach Drive, just west of state Route 19, Hawaiʻi Belt Road, at 20°0′16″N 155°49′30″W, about 2.6 miles (4.2 km) south of Kawaihae, Hawaii. A part of the Ala Kahakai National Historic Trail can be hiked north to Samuel M. Spencer Beach Park or south to Hāpuna Beach State Recreation Area. Although public restrooms and showers are available, a limited number of parking passes are available at the resort gate. The beach was named "America's Best Beach" in 2000 by Florida International University professor Stephen Leatherman.

== History ==
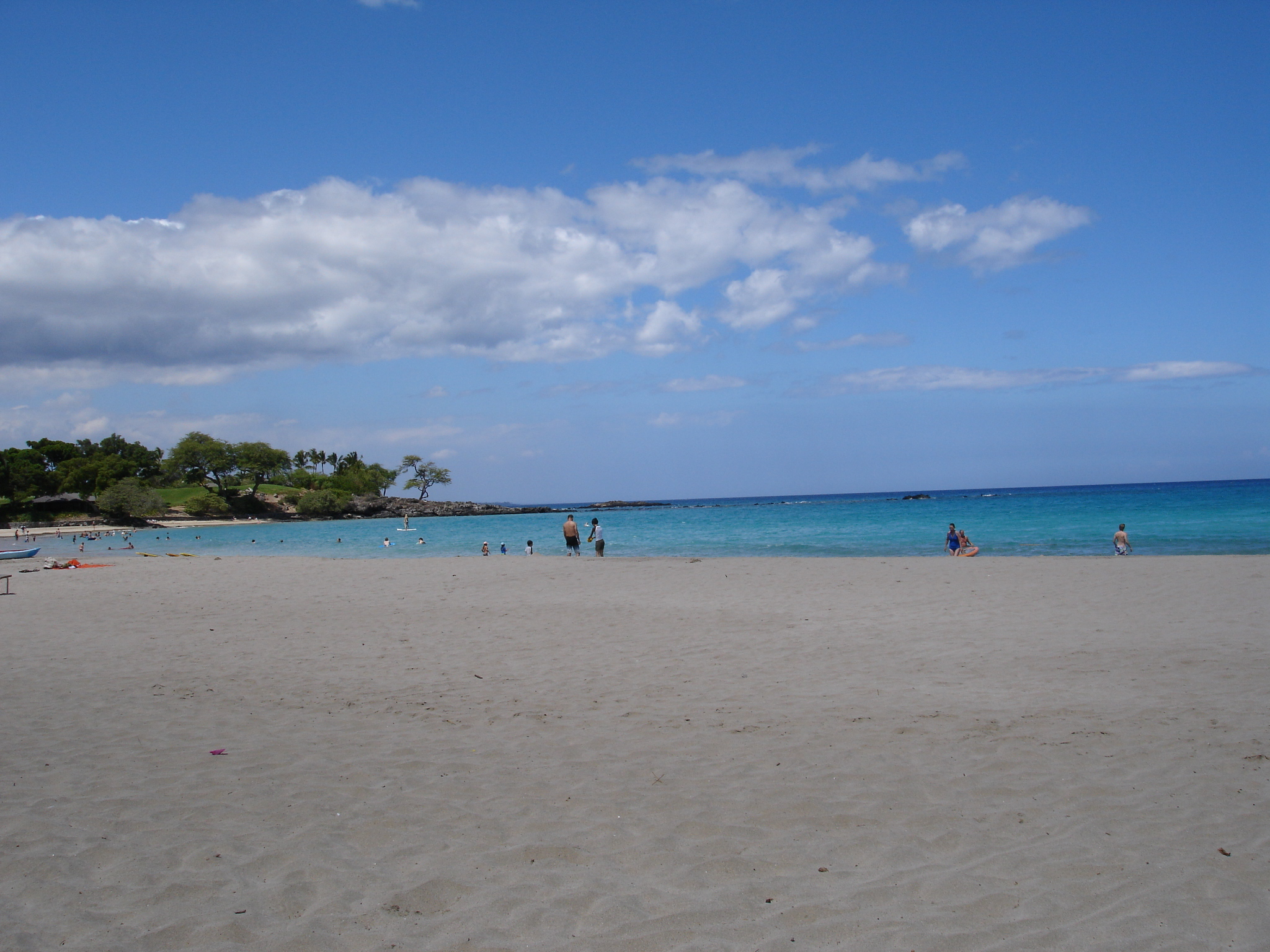
Kauna'oa Beach

The land above the bay is part of the Parker Ranch. In 1960 the area was a remote, barren, hot lava field unsuitable for cattle grazing. William F. Quinn, the governor of the new state of Hawaii, invited Laurance Rockefeller to visit the islands as part of a study for a federal commission that Rockefeller chaired. After visiting the ranch, Rockefeller was taken for a swim in the bay. Plans for a resort began in January 1961. The state agreed to pave the Hawaii Belt Road (called the Queen Kaʻahumanu highway for this section) to the site and build a new Kona International Airport. Rockefeller bought the land of the nearby Puʻukoholā Heiau and donated it for a National Historic Park. Original plans were to use architect John Carl Warnecke and build a series of small cottages, but those plans were abandoned. Instead firm Skidmore, Owings and Merrill was hired to use a modern style.

The open-air design allowed natural ventilation from the trade winds, although rooms had air conditioning available. The hotel finally opened in July 1965, one of the most expensive at the time. Hotels with similar designs would be built along the Kohala coast over the next decades. Ranch owner Richard Smart negotiated a long-term lease of the land. The hotel was named Mauna Kea Beach Hotel for the mountain Mauna Kea which is visible above the bay when not obscured by clouds.

Before development hawksbill turtles nested on the beach. In 1973 a lawsuit was filed to allow public access to the beach. An agreement was finally reached after seven years of litigation. A small number of parking spaces were made available starting in 1981, and trails opened up along the shoreline.

The bay was only a few miles from the 2006 Kiholo Bay earthquake which damaged the hotel. The hotel reopened in early 2009.
