= Mauna Kea Beach Hotel =

Building in Big Island, Hawaii

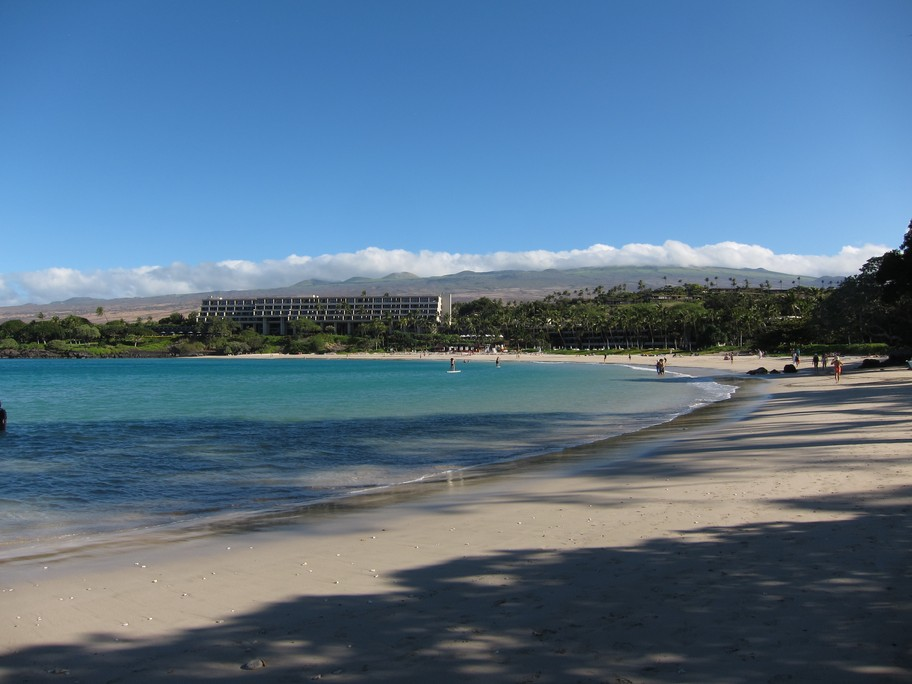
- View of the Mauna Kea Beach Hotel and Kaunaʻoa Bay

General information
- Location: Kohala, Big Island, Hawaii
- Coordinates: 20.005416°N 155.823727°W
- Opening: 1965, 1996, 2008
- Closed: 1994, 2006 (for renovations)
- Owner: Seibu Holdings Inc., Cerberus Capital Management
- Operator: Prince Resorts Hawaii, a division of Prince Hotels

Technical details
- Floor count: 8

Design and construction
- Architects: Edward Charles Bassett of Skidmore, Owings and Merrill; interior design, Davis Allen of SOM; Wimberly Allison Tong & Goo (8th Floor Addition and Beach Tower); John Hara and Associates (2006 Renovations)
- Developer: Laurance Rockefeller

Other information
- Number of rooms: 252 (rooms and suites), 310 rooms and suites prior to renovation
- Number of restaurants: 4 (Manta, Hau Tree, Copper Bar, Number 3)

Website
- Official website

The Mauna Kea Beach Hotel is a hotel property on the Kohala Coast of the island of Hawaii. It sits at Kaunaʻoa Bay. The American Institute of Architects (AIA) gave the hotel an Honor Award in 1967 citing its "restrained detailing and fine spatial sequences." In 2007, the hotel received honors again from the AIA as it made the top 150 of its "America's Favorite Architecture" list.

== History ==
The Mauna Kea Beach Hotel was developed and constructed by Laurance S. Rockefeller. He visited the newly-admitted 50th state in July 1960, and was asked by Governor William F. Quinn to help develop the islands beyond Oahu for tourism. Rockefeller fell in love with Kaunaoa Bay, the hotel's future location, after going for a swim there. He secured a 99-year lease on the 500-acre (200 ha) location from Parker Ranch owner Richard Smart in August 1961. The hotel was named after Mauna Kea, which is visible above the bay when not obscured by clouds.

Original plans, started in 1961, were to use architect John Carl Warnecke and build a series of small cottages, but those plans were abandoned. Instead the firm of Skidmore, Owings and Merrill was hired, and architect Edward Charles Bassett designed a striking hotel structure in the modern style. The open-air design allowed natural ventilation from the trade winds, although rooms had air conditioning available. Hotels with similar designs would be built along the Kohala coast over the next decades.

The interior design was conceived by Davis Allen of Skidmore, Owings & Merrill, with the assistance of Margo Grant Walsh. It included traditional textiles, carvings, metal and ceramic objects from Hawai'i, the Pacific Islands, and Southeast Asia. Richard Joseph, Esquire's travel writer, likened the hotel to "strolling through an open-air museum and art gallery—past Hawaiian quilts hung as tapestries, bronze ceremonial drums and red-and-gold scroll boxes from Thailand, Japanese and Chinese scrolls and paintings, New Guinea carvings and masks ..."

Construction on the resort's golf course, designed by Robert Trent Jones, began first, on August 8, 1963. Construction on the hotel began on January 4, 1964. The golf course opened on February 1, 1965, while the Mauna Kea Beach Hotel itself opened on July 2, 1965, operated by Rockefeller's hotel company RockResorts. In August 1967, ground was broken for a 102-room addition to the hotel, designed by Honolulu architects Wimberly, Whisenand, Allison, Tong and Goo, with interior design by Phyllis Brownlee, which opened in August 1968. The hotel famously operated without guestroom televisions until 1995.

In 1978, Rockefeller sold the hotel to United Airlines. United placed the hotel in their Western International Hotels division, which was renamed Westin Hotels in 1981. The hotel itself was renamed The Westin Mauna Kea for much of the early 1980s. The hotel was purchased in 1990 by Yoshiaki Tsutsumi of Seibu Railway and has since been managed by one of his companies, Prince Hotels. The hotel closed in 1994 for a two-year renovation. In August of that year, a sister hotel was opened on the property, the Hapuna Beach Prince Hotel, also designed by Wimberly Allison Tong and Goo. The Mauna Kea Beach Hotel reopened in January 1996. From 1996-2001 the Prince Hotels in Hawaii and Alaska were all franchised to Westin Hotels, and the hotel rejoined the chain for five years as The Westin Mauna Kea Beach Hotel.

The Mauna Kea Beach Hotel closed due to structural damage caused by the 2006 Kiholo Bay earthquake. After a $150 million renovation, the hotel reopened in March 2009, with a soft reopening on December 20, 2008. The hotel joined Marriott's Autograph Collection Hotels division in 2015. It was also inducted into Historic Hotels of America, the official program of the National Trust for Historic Preservation, in 2016.

The hotel was renovated from 2025-2026, at a cost of $180 million, reopening in February 2026.

The golf course is featured as part of the course lineup in the Links golf game for PC.
