= Hāpuna Beach State Recreation Area =

Beach in Hawaii, United States

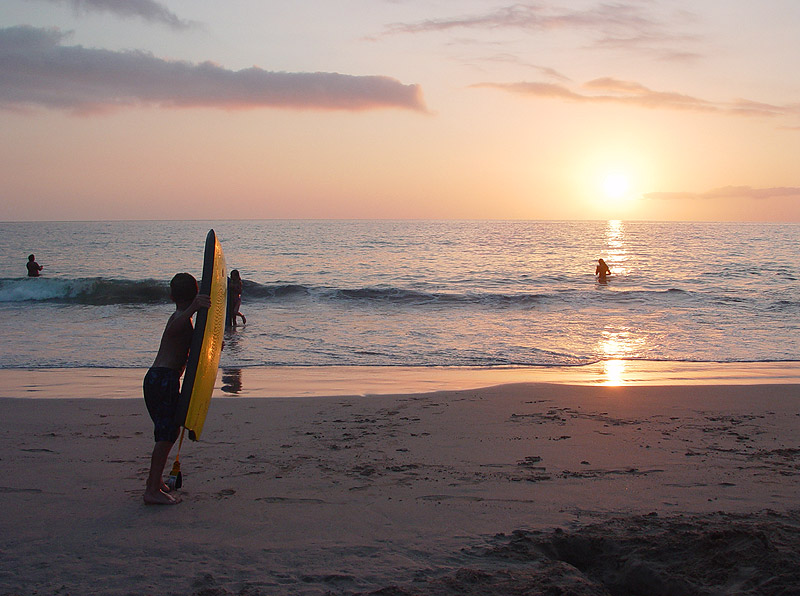
A young skimboarder prepares to run into the waves at sunset at Hapuna Beach

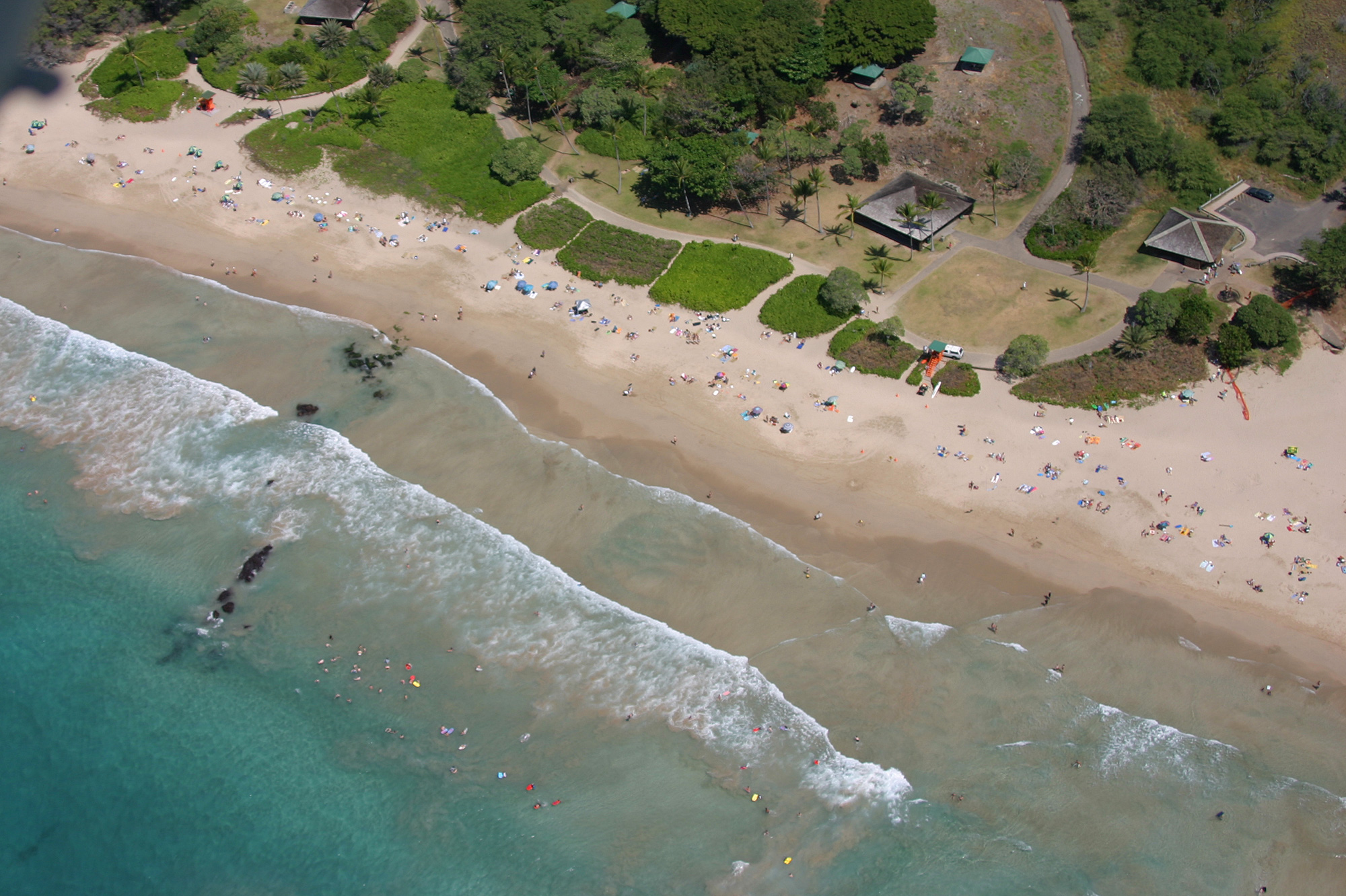
2005 aerial view of Hapuna Beach

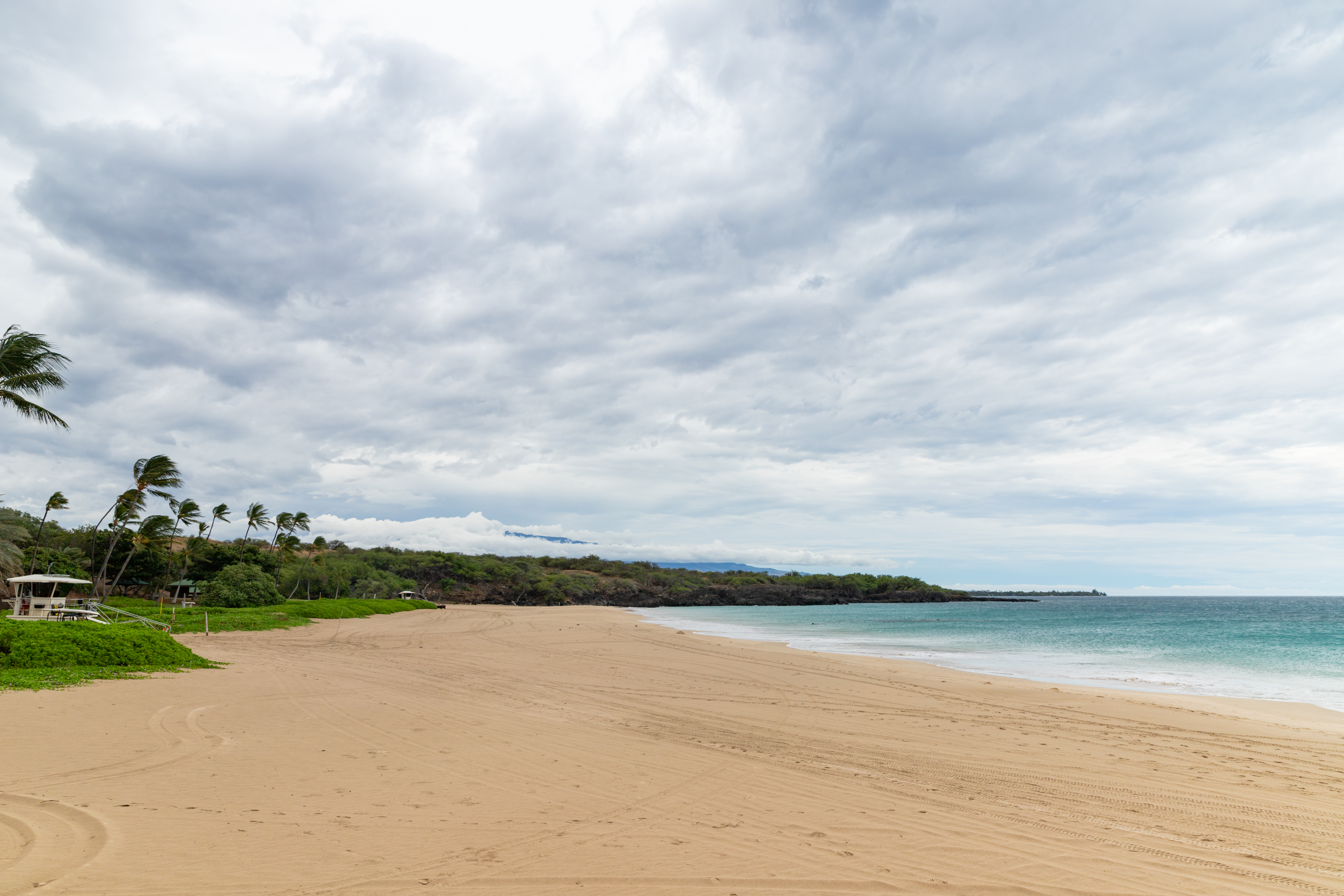
Hapuna beach during Hurricane Lane (2018), island of Hawaii

Hāpuna Beach State Recreation Area is a large park and sandy beach on the Big Island of Hawaii. The Hapuna Beach Prince Hotel is also located adjacent to the beach. Hāpuna (literally, "spring" or "pool" in Hawaiian) is popular with residents and visitors.

This is one of a few other white sand beaches on the west coast of the Big Island. The few others include Kua Bay, Manini'owali Beach, Kaunaʻoa Bay, known as Mauna Kea Beach, and Samuel M. Spencer Beach Park. It was named the Best Beach in America by Florida International University professor Stephen Leatherman, known as "Dr Beach", in 1993 and 2021.

The 61.8-acre (25.0 ha) park is located at coordinates 19°59.4789′N 155°49.3809′W, west of Hawaii Belt Road (Route 19, called Queen Kaʻahumanu Highway) on Hapuna Beach Road. It is about 2.3 miles (3.7 km) south of Kawaihae, Hawaii. A part of the Ala Kahakai National Historic Trail runs through the park from Spencer Beach to the north, to Puako to the south.

Hāpuna beach has lifeguards, but can be hazardous during high surf conditions since the beach is not protected from the open ocean.

== Junior lifeguard program ==
Every Summer, Hawai’i County hosts a Junior Lifeguard Program at Hāpuna for youths 12–17 years of age.

On Saturday, June 29, 2019, Hāpuna hosted the Hawai’i Island Junior Lifeguard Championships.

== Park and Rec services ==
The park has free admission for Hawai’i residents and $5 for visitors, paved parking, pavilions, picnic areas, restrooms, and showers. Camping permits are available.

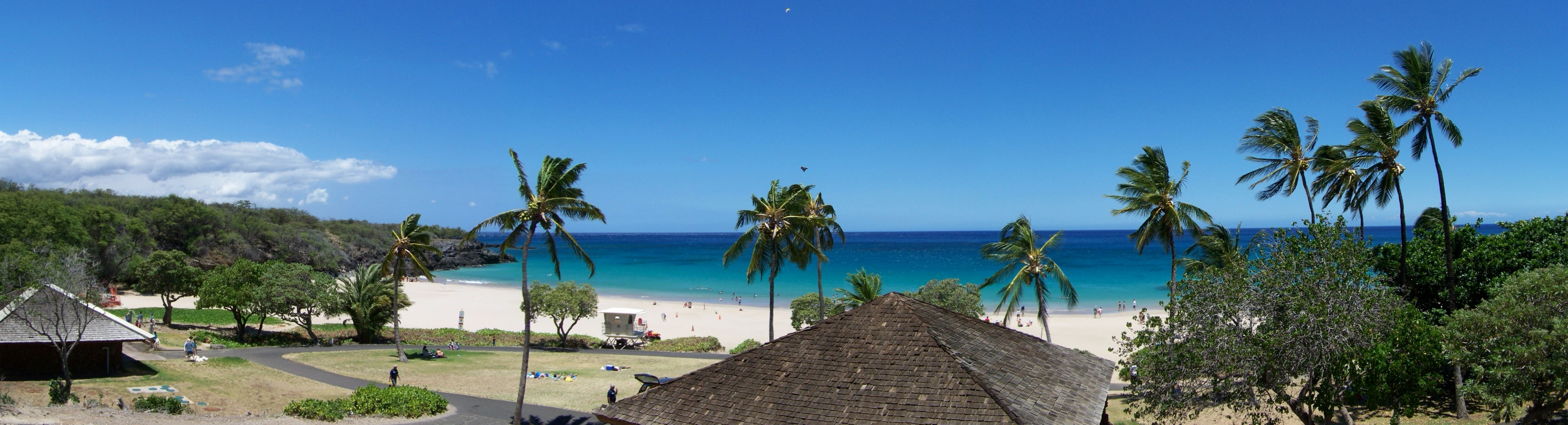
Panorama of Hapuna Beach, island of Hawaii.
