= Stephen Leatherman =

American scientist and author (born 1947)

- Born: November 6, 1947 (age 78)
- Other name: Dr. Beach
- Education: University of Virginia; North Carolina State University
- Known for: annual beach ratings
- Scientific career
- Fields: geosciences; coastal ecology
- Workplaces: Florida International University
- Website: www.drbeach.org

Stephen Parker Leatherman, also known as Dr. Beach, (born November 6, 1947) is an American geoscientist, coastal ecologist, and author. He was the first director of the International Hurricane Research Center at Florida International University (FIU), from 1997 to 2009. He then became professor and co-director of the Laboratory for Coastal Research at FIU. Leatherman often discuss his research on beach quality evaluations, beach erosion, coastal storm and sea level rise impacts and rip currents.

== Education ==
Leatherman earned his Ph.D. in environmental (coastal) sciences from the University of Virginia in 1976 and a B.S. degree in geosciences from North Carolina State University in 1970. He served in the United States Army from 1970 to 1972, mostly in the Corps of Engineers Cold Regions Research and Engineering Laboratory (CRREL) in Hanover, New Hampshire.

== Beach ratings ==
Leatherman is known for his annual ratings of the top beaches in the United States where he releases a list each Memorial Day weekend since 1991, which is based on 50 criteria scored on a five-point scale. His #1 beach for 2020 was Grayton Beach in the Florida panhandle and for 2021 was Hapuna Beach State Park in Hawaii and 2022 was Ocracoke Lifeguarded Beach on Ocracoke Island, Outer Banks, North Carolina.

== Writings ==
Stephen Leatherman has produced 20 books and National Academy reports and more than 200 refereed journal articles and technical reports, including articles in both Science and Nature on coastal science and public policy.

=== Books published ===
- The Beach Book, 2021, 363 manuscript pages, in review.
- The 3rd International Rip Current Symposium (with Jung Lee and Jooyong Lee, editors), Journal of Coastal Research Special Issue 72, 2014, 195 pp.
- Field Guide To The Water's Edge (with Jack Williams), National Geographic, Washington, DC, 2012, 335p. (members edition).
- Rip Currents: Beach Safety, Physical Oceanography And Wave Modeling (with John Fletemeyer, editors), CRC Press International, 2011, 277pp.
- Hurricanes (with Jack Williams), World Life Library, London, England, 2008, 72pp.
- Dr. Beach's Survival Guide: What You Need To Know About Sharks, Rip Currents & More Before Going In The Water, Yale University Press, New Haven, CT, 2003, 106 pp.
- Beach Vacation Travel Journal, AAA, Heathrow, FL, 2002, 80pp.
- Sea Level Rise: History And Consequences (with B. Douglas and M. Kearney, editors), Academic Press, 2001, 228 pp.
- Coastal Erosion Mapping and Management (with M. Crowell, editors), Journal of Coastal Research, Special Issue No. 28, 1999, 196 pp.
- America's Best Beaches, Laboratory for Coastal Research, Florida International University, Miami, FL, 1998, 112 pp. (Distributed by University Press of Florida).
- Island States At Risk: Global Climate Change, Population and Development, Journal of Coastal Research, Special Issue No. 24, editor, 1997, 242 pp.
- Potential Impacts Of Accelerated Sea Level Rise On Developing Countries (With R. Nicholls, editors), Journal of Coastal Research, Special Issue No. 14, 1995, 323 pp.
- Managing Coastal Erosion (with others), National Academy Press, Washington, 1990, 182 pp.
- Cape Cod: From Glaciers To Beaches, Laboratory for Coastal Research, University of Maryland, College Park, MD, 1988, 132 pp.
- Responding To Changes In Sea Level: Engineering Implications (with others), National Academy Press, Washington, D.C., 1987, 148 pp.
- Remote Sensing Laboratory Manual (with S. Goward), Kendall-Hunt Publishing Co., Dubuque, Iowa, 1986, 116 pp.
- Barrier Islands (with G. Oertel, editors), Special Issue, Marine Geology, V. 63, Elsevier Publishing Co., Amsterdam, the Netherlands, 1985, 419 pp.
- Overwash Processes, Benchmark Papers in Geology, Hutchinson and Ross Publishing Co., Stroudsburg, PA, editor, 1981, 376 pp.
- Environmental Geologic Guide To Cape Cod National Seashore, Society of Economic Paleontologists and Mineralogists, Eastern Section, editor, 1979, 249 pp.
- Barrier Island Handbook, Laboratory for Coastal Research, University of Maryland, College Park, MD, editor, 1979, 101 pp., reprinted 1980; revised and reprinted 1982; revised and reprinted, 1988.
- Barrier Islands: From Gulf Of St. Lawrence To Gulf Of Mexico, Academic Press, New York, editor, 1979, 325 pp.

=== Major contributions ===
- 1st case study of coastal impacts of global warming-induced sea level rise- Leatherman conducted a study of the geomorphic effects of projected sea level rise impacts of Galveston, Texas as funded by US Environmental Protection Agency in 1983.
- US Congress testimony on climate change impacts
- Center for Global Change—Leatherman directed and co-founded this first-of-its-kind center in the world at the University of Maryland, College Park in 1989
- Vanishing Lands documentary film (1991)
- Computerized mapping technique for determination of historical shoreline changes and beach erosion rates
- Presidential Task Force on Barrier Islands
- 1st hurricane simulator
- 1st LIDAR mapping of hurricane storm surge zones
- Rating scale for beaches
- 1st field measurements of storm-generated over wash surges
- Leatherman sand trap

== Awards and honors ==
Leatherman won several awards including:

- World Top 2% Referenced Scientists by Stanford University, 2020
- Florida Icon, Florida Trend Magazine, 2018
- Russell Award—AAG Award in Coastal & Marine Research, 2014
- Ocean Warrior Award, Profiles in Sea Voices: Working Toward a Sea Change, Healy Publishing Company, San Clemente, California, 2010
- Environmental Hero Award, The Climate Institute, Washington, DC, 2006
- 40 People to Watch in South Florida, Miami Herald Newspaper, December 12, 1999

== University appointments ==
Leatherman taught coastal courses at the following universities (in order): University of Virginia, Boston University, University of Massachusetts Amherst, Yale University, University of Maryland at College Park, Duke University Marine Laboratory, and Florida International University.

== Expert witness ==
Leatherman testified before U.S. House of Representatives and Senate Committees eleven times on a variety of coastal issues. He also has been an expert witness in lawsuits regarding coastal erosion and beach safety, especially involving rip currents.
