= Florida Complex League Blue Jays =

- (1981–1985, 1991–1995, 2007–present); Dunedin, Florida

Minor league affiliations
- Class: Rookie
- League: Florida Complex League
- Previous leagues: Gulf Coast League (1981–1985, 1991–1995, 2007–2020)

Major league affiliations
- Team: Toronto Blue Jays

Minor league titles
- League titles (1): 2025
- Division titles (2): 1992; 2015

Team data
- Name: FCL Blue Jays
- Previous names: GCL Blue Jays (1981–1985, 1991–1995, 2007–2020)
- Ballpark: Bobby Mattick Training Center at Englebert Complex
- Owner/ Operator: Toronto Blue Jays (Rogers Communications)
- General manager: Michael Nielsen
- Manager: Andy Fermin

The Florida Complex League Blue Jays are a Rookie-level affiliate of the Toronto Blue Jays, competing in the Florida Complex League of Minor League Baseball. Prior to 2021, the team was known as the Gulf Coast League Blue Jays. The team plays its home games in Dunedin, Florida, at the Bobby Mattick Training Center at Englebert Complex. The team is composed mainly of players who are in their first year of professional baseball either as draftees or non-drafted free agents from the United States, Canada, Dominican Republic, Venezuela and other countries.

== History ==
The team first competed in the Gulf Coast League (GCL) during 1981–1985 and 1991–1995. After being absent from the league from 1996 through 2006, the team returned to the GCL in 2007, replacing the Pulaski Blue Jays of the Appalachian League in the Blue Jays' farm system. The team won division titles in 1992 and 2015, winning their first FCL championship in 2025.

Prior to the 2021 season, the Gulf Coast League was renamed as the Florida Complex League (FCL).

== Year-by-year records ==
Year	Div.	Finish	W	L	W%	Manager	Playoffs
1981	West	9th	26	39	.400	Rich Hacker	No playoffs until 1983
1982	West	6th	30	33	.476	Hector Torres	
1983	Northern	4th	15	46	.246	Epy Guerrero	
1984	Northern	4th	29	34	.460	Ray Webster	
1985	Northern	4th	23	39	.371	Rocket Wheeler	
1991	Southern	2nd	31	28	.525	Omar Malavé	
1992	Southern	1st	35	24	.593	Omar Malavé	Lost in 1st round vs. GCL Expos (1 game to 0)
1993	Northern	4th	22	38	.367	Héctor Torres	
1994	Northern	2nd	26	34	.433	Doug Ault	
1995	Northern	4th	19	40	.322	Rocket Wheeler	
2007	Northern	2nd	36	24	.600	Clayton McCullough	
2008	North	6th	26	32	.448	Dave Pano	
2009	North	3rd	30	28	.517	John Schneider	
2010	North	2nd	31	28	.525	John Schneider	
2011	North	4th	27	32	.458	Omar Malavé	
2012	North	5th	22	38	.367	Omar Malavé	
2013	Northwest	3rd	28	32	.467	John Schneider	
2014	Northwest	4th	18	41	.305	Kenny Graham	
2015	Northwest	1st	39	19	.672	Cesar Martin	Lost League Finals vs. GCL Red Sox (2 games to 0); Won in first round vs. GCL Tigers (1 game to 0)
2016	Northwest	2nd	39	17	.696	Cesar Martin	
2017	Northwest	3rd	35	25	.583	Luis Hurtado	
2018	Northwest	12th	24	29	.453	Luis Hurtado	
2019	North	7th	27	23	.540	Dennis Holmberg	Playoffs cancelled due to Hurricane Dorian
2020	North	No season due to COVID-19 pandemic in Florida					
2021	North	10th	25	29	.463	Brent Lavallee	
2022	North	8th	28	27	.509	Jose Mayorga	
2023	North	15th	17	37	.315	Jose Mayorga	

== Roster ==
Florida Complex League Blue Jays roster
Players	Coaches/Other
Pitchers: -- Trace Baker; -- Micah Bucknam; -- Mason Davenport; 12 Eduar Gonzalez; 40 Troy Guthrie; -- Brayden Heidel; -- Luke Kovach; -- Karson Ligon; 32 Carson Messina; -- Seojun Moon; 27 Sann Omosako; -- Noah Palmese; -- Jared Spencer; 43 Ramon Suarez; 26 Aiden Taggart; 38 Giacomo Taschin; 24 Luis Torres; 21 Pedro Tucent; 30 Franly Urena; -- Dylan Watts; -- Reece Wissinger; Catchers: 52 Dylan Leach; 8 Maykel Minoso; 5 Juan Rosas; -- Charlie Saum; Infielders: 33 Aldo Gaxiola; 49 Owen Gregg; -- JoJo Parker; 15 Gavin Smith; -- Sam White; Outfielders: 36 Andres Arias; 22 Enmanuel Bonilla; -- Blaine Bullard; -- Jake Cook; 9 David Guzman; -- Tim Piasentin; -- Jordan Rich	Manager: -- Danny Canellas; Coaches: -- Jesus Azuaje (hitting); -- Sawyer Bridges (assistant pitching); 65 Jacob Caples (hitting); -- Angel Guzman (coach); 61 Yoel Hernández (pitching); -- Dimas Ponce (bench); 7-day injured list; * On Toronto Blue Jays 40-man roster; ~ Development list; # Rehab assignment; ∞ Reserve list; ‡ Restricted list; § Suspended list; † Temporarily inactive list; Roster updated January 14, 2026; Transactions; → More rosters: MiLB • Florida Complex League; → Toronto Blue Jays minor league players
