= DFAC =

DFAC may refer to:

- Dongfeng Automobile Company, a Chinese automobile company
- Dunedin Fine Art Center, a museum in Dunedin, Florida, U.S.
- A US Army abbreviation for a dining facility
