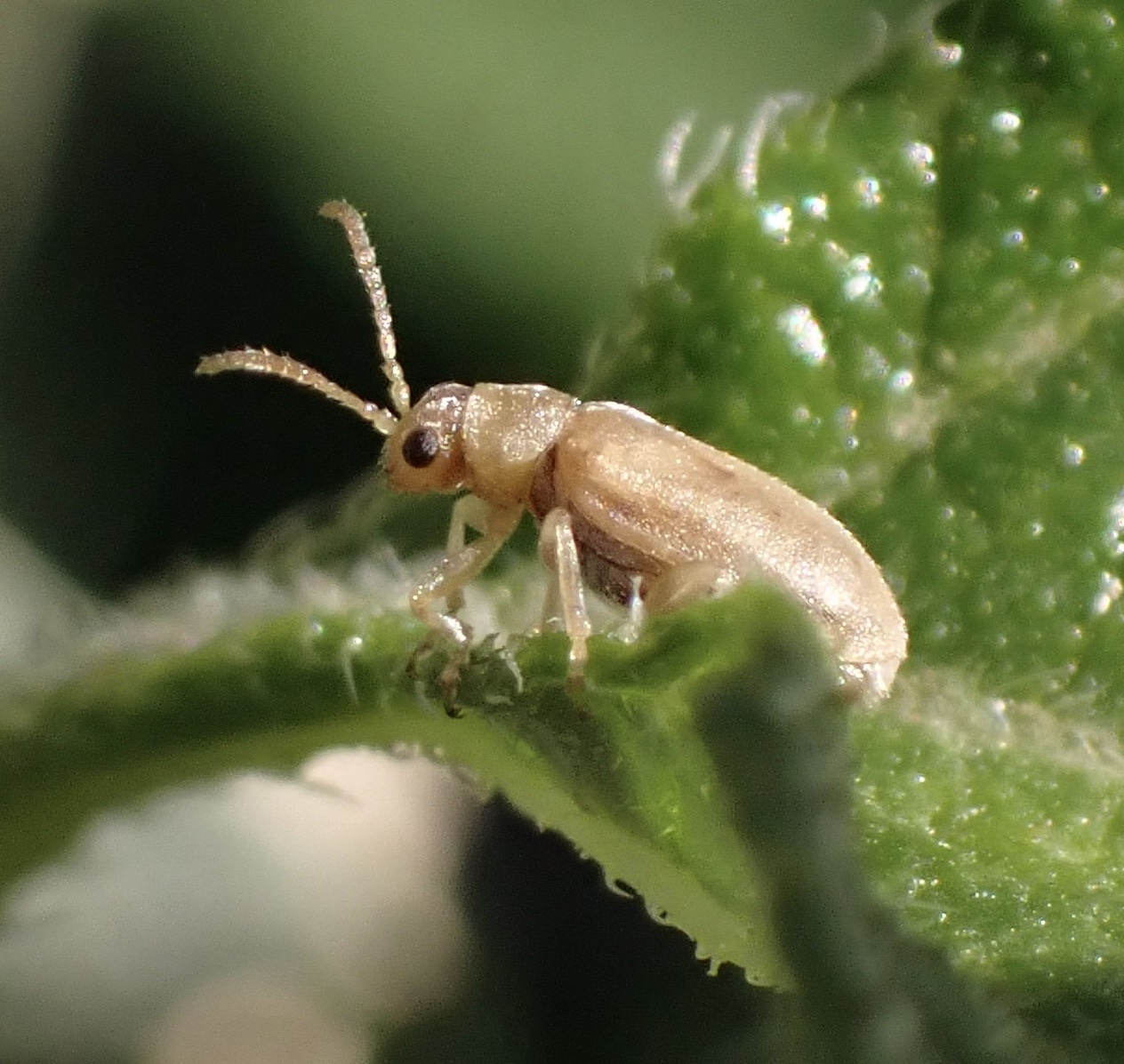
- Monoxia obesula, Tarragona, Spain

Scientific classification
- Kingdom: Animalia
- Phylum: Arthropoda
- Clade: Pancrustacea
- Class: Insecta
- Order: Coleoptera
- Suborder: Polyphaga
- Infraorder: Cucujiformia
- Family: Chrysomelidae
- Tribe: Galerucini
- Genus: Monoxia; J. L. LeConte, 1865

= Monoxia =

Genus of beetles

Monoxia is a genus of skeletonizing leaf beetles in the family Chrysomelidae. There are about 18 described species in Monoxia. They are found in North America and the Neotropics.

== Species ==
These 18 species belong to the genus Monoxia:

- Monoxia andrewsi Riley, 2020
- Monoxia angularis (J. L. LeConte, 1859)
- Monoxia apicalis Blake, 1939
- Monoxia batisia Blatchley, 1917
- Monoxia beebei Blake
- Monoxia brisleyi Blake, 1939
- Monoxia consputa (J. L. LeConte, 1857)
- Monoxia debilis J. L. LeConte, 1865
- Monoxia elegans Blake, 1939
- Monoxia grisea Blake, 1939
- Monoxia guttulata (J. L. LeConte, 1865)
- Monoxia inornata Blake, 1939
- Monoxia minuta Blake, 1939
- Monoxia obesula Blake, 1939
- Monoxia pallida Blake, 1939
- Monoxia puberula Blake, 1939
- Monoxia schizonycha Blake, 1939
- Monoxia sordida (J. L. LeConte, 1858)
