= Hotel Paradox =

Hotel Paradox may refer to:

- Paradox Hotel Vancouver, a hotel in Vancouver, British Columbia, Canada
- Hotel Paradox (Santa Cruz), a hotel in Santa Cruz, California, United States
- Hotel Paradox (album), an album by jazz saxophonist Joe Henderson
- Hilbert's paradox of the Grand Hotel, a thought experiment in mathematics
