= Humaniti Montréal =

Hotel in Montreal, Canada

Coordinates: 45.5038°N 73.5625°W

Humaniti Hotel Montréal
- Hotel chain: Autograph Collection

General information
- Opening: 2021
- Owner: Urgo Hotels & Resorts
- Operator: Cogir Real Estate, Fonds de solidarité FTQ

Design and construction
- Architect: Lemay

Other information
- Number of rooms: 193
- Number of restaurants: 1

Website
- https://www.humanitihotel.com/

Humaniti Montréal is a mixed-use development in Downtown Montreal, Quebec. Described as a "vertical village", the 39-storey building features a mix of residential and commercial space, as well as a 193-room luxury hotel operating under Marriott's Autograph Collection chain. It is located directly opposite from Palais des congrès de Montréal and is several blocks from Old Montreal and Quartier des spectacles.

== History ==
Construction of Humaniti began in 2017; backed by Cogir Real Estate and Fonds de solidarité FTQ,the 39-storey "vertical village" would feature a mixture of retail and office space, condo and rental space, and a 193-room Autograph Collection hotel operated by Urgo Hotels & Resorts. The hotel began operations in June 2021.

== Design ==
The tower was designed by Lemay, while Andres Escobar of Lemay + Escobar oversaw the hotel's interior design, drawing inspiration from the modernist style and incorporating numerous pieces from Québecois artists. The letter "H" is used as a recurring motif in the property's design, including the shape of the towers, a Marc Séguin sculpture titled Hanima, and the rooms being divided into the categories "Halo", "Harmonie", "Hibiscus", and "Hop".

De la Gauchetière Street and Viger Avenue are linked by the hotel's courtyard which has flora, benches, and a pool. Humaniti's roof has a temperature-controlled swimming pool. The hotel has a gym that occupies two floors. Occupying 2,000 square feet (190 m^{2}), its Spa Humaniti houses four service rooms as well as two sections for pedicures and two for manicures. Jean-Sébastien Giguère is the restaurant h3's founding executive chef. Inspired by French cuisine, the restaurant uses seasonal items from nearby suppliers. The hotel's wine cellar holds 3,000 bottles.

The hotel has 193 rooms and suites. The rooms have floor-to-ceiling windows. The smallest room is 334 square feet (31.0 m^{2}), while the largest room, the Hero suite, is 1,200 square feet (110 m^{2}). The upper levels of the tower contains 300 rental units and 150 condominiums, ranging from 400 square feet (37 m^{2}) to 3,000 square feet (280 m^{2}). Residents receive access to the amenities in the Humaniti hotel, including the spa and fitness centre among others.
