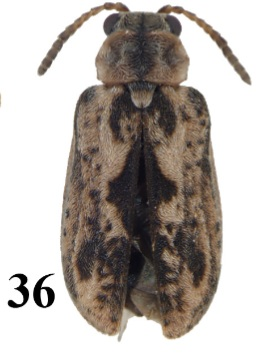
- Yingabruxia

Scientific classification
- Kingdom: Animalia
- Phylum: Arthropoda
- Clade: Pancrustacea
- Class: Insecta
- Order: Coleoptera
- Suborder: Polyphaga
- Infraorder: Cucujiformia
- Family: Chrysomelidae
- Subfamily: Galerucinae
- Tribe: Galerucini
- Genus: Yingabruxia; Viswajyothi & Clark, 2022

= Yingabruxia =

Genus of leaf beetles

Yingabruxia is a genus of beetles belonging to the family Chrysomelidae.

== Species ==
- Yingabruxia apicalis
- Yingabruxia batisia
- Yingabruxia brisleyi
- Yingabruxia sordida (LeConte, 1858)
