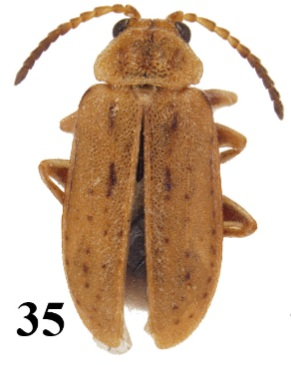

Scientific classification
- Kingdom: Animalia
- Phylum: Arthropoda
- Clade: Pancrustacea
- Class: Insecta
- Order: Coleoptera
- Suborder: Polyphaga
- Infraorder: Cucujiformia
- Family: Chrysomelidae
- Genus: Monoxia
- Species: M. angularis

Binomial name
- Monoxia angularis (J. L. LeConte, 1859)

Synonyms
- Galleruca angularis LeConte, 1859

= Monoxia angularis =

Species of beetle

Monoxia angularis, the angular flea beetle, is a species of skeletonizing leaf beetle in the family Chrysomelidae. It is found in North America, where it has been recorded from Alberta, British Columbia, Washington, Oregon, California, Idaho, Montana, Wyoming, Colorado, Nevada, Utah, North Dakota and Kentucky.
