= Hotel Paradox (Santa Cruz) =

Hotel in Santa Cruz, California

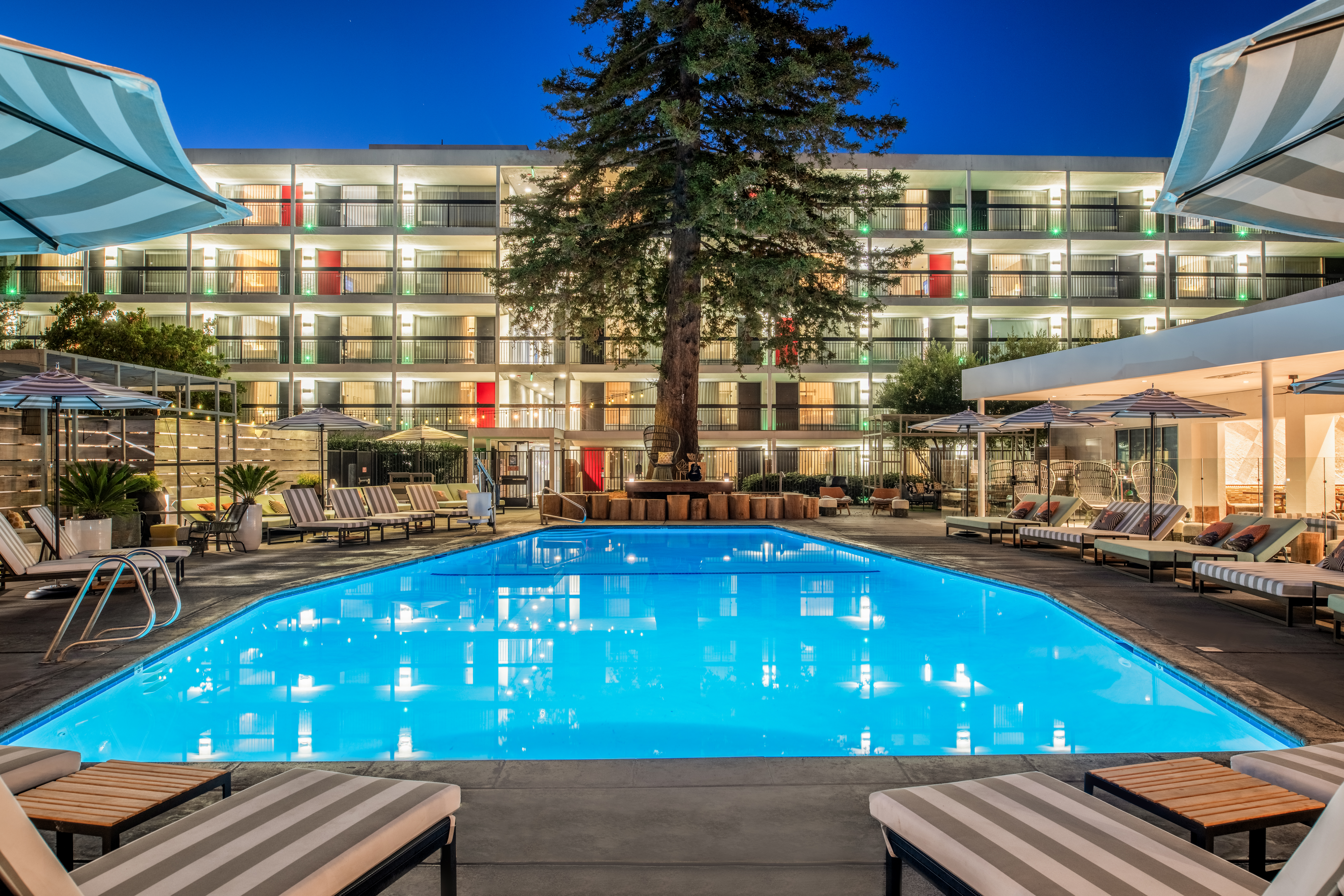
- Hotel Paradox, Marriott Autograph Collection, near the ocean in Santa Cruz

General information
- Location: 611 Ocean Street, Santa Cruz, California, U.S.
- Coordinates: 36.9768°N 122.0209°W
- Opening: 1969 (as Holiday Inn); 2012 (as Hotel Paradox)
- Renovated: 2012; 2023
- Owner: Private
- Operator: Pyramid Global Hospitality
- Affiliation: Autograph Collection (Marriott International)

Technical details
- Floor count: 5

Design and construction
- Architect: Kollin Altomare Architects (2023 renovation)
- Developer: Werner Jasper

Other information
- Number of rooms: 170

Website
- Official website

Hotel Paradox is a five-story hotel located at 611 Ocean Street in Santa Cruz, California, United States. The building originally opened in 1969 as a Holiday Inn. From 2001 to 2011, the University of California, Santa Cruz leased the property as the University Inn & Conference Center, where it was used for student and faculty housing.

After the lease ended, the building was acquired by BPR Properties and underwent a $13.3 million renovation before reopening in September 2012 as Hotel Paradox. The hotel joined Marriott International’s Autograph Collection in 2016. Since 2023, it has been managed by Pyramid Global Hospitality.

== History ==
In April 1969, a contract valued at $1.4 million was awarded to local contractor Werner Jasper for construction of a five-story Holiday Inn on Ocean Street. The hotel operated as a Holiday Inn until 2001, when it was leased by UCSC and renamed the University Inn & Conference Center. After the lease concluded in 2011, the building closed for extensive renovation before reopening in 2012 as Hotel Paradox under the ownership of Palo Alto-based BPR Properties, led by Perry Patel.

== Design and features ==
The hotel was redesigned by the San Francisco-based design firm ODADA, led by David Todd Oldroyd. The interior design incorporates an “urban forest” concept using natural materials and locally inspired artwork.

The lobby features a reception desk constructed from a 15,000-pound reclaimed eucalyptus log, along with wood paneling, tree-stump tables, and porcelain tile flooring designed to resemble granite. Ceramic squirrel sculptures reference a live squirrel discovered inside the log during construction.

Guest rooms include custom headboards made from reclaimed snow fence planks and sliding barn-style bathroom doors.

The property includes 10,318 square feet (958.6 m^{2}) of combined indoor and outdoor meeting and event space, including a ballroom, flexible meeting rooms, and outdoor areas, such as poolside cabana space and a terrace.

== Renovations ==
A second major renovation was completed in 2023, refreshing guest rooms, public areas, meeting spaces, and the pool plaza. Local reporting described the project as a multimillion-dollar update connected to broader post-COVID-pandemic tourism recovery in Santa Cruz.

As part of the renovation, new exterior murals by Santa Cruz artist Jeremiah Kille were installed, later covered by local media.

== Sustainability ==
Hotel Paradox participates in local environmental initiatives, including a partnership with the Santa Cruz Bee Company to maintain rooftop beehives and host educational activities related to pollination and sustainability.

== See also ==
- Autograph Collection Hotels
- Holiday Inn
