= Fenway Hotel =

Hotel building in Dunedin, Florida, US

Coordinates: 28°0′22″N 82°47′26″W

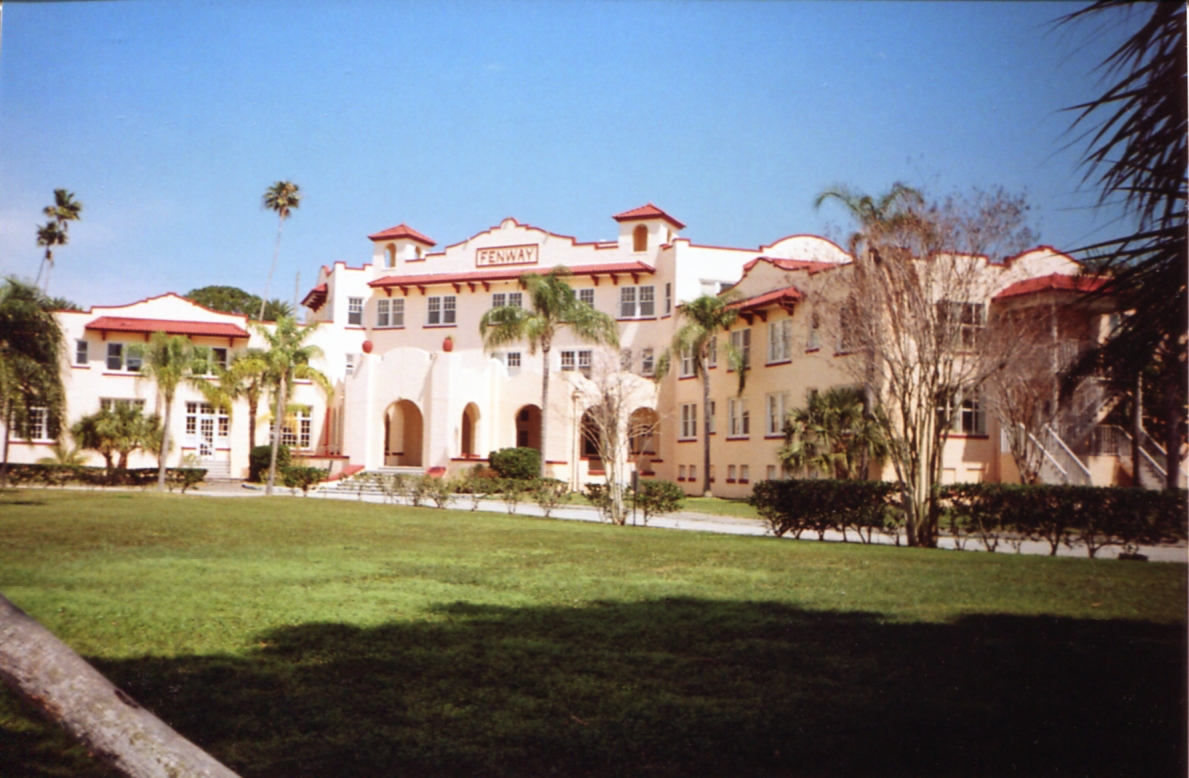
Fenway Hotel

Fenway Hotel is a historic Jazz Age hotel building in Dunedin, Florida.

== Construction ==
Building plans and funding plans were obtained in 1924 and construction of the hotel began the same year, before a hiatus due to financing problems. Construction was completed in 1927.

== History ==
The hotel operated seasonally until 1961 when it became home to Trinity College. In 1988, Trinity College moved to Pasco County. In 1991, Schiller International University purchased the property and kept it until 2005.

The Tampa Bay Times called the hotel building Dunedin's "most historically valuable structure". Herman Everett Wendell, who also designed the Suwannee Hotel in St. Petersburg, Florida was the building's architect.

The 110-room hotel was home to radio station WGHB, the first in Pinellas County, which began broadcasting in 1925. The station was named after developer George H. Bowes, and was the precursor to WFLA.

Guests included Harley M. Kilgore, Kenesaw Mountain Landis, Stephen Early, Alfred M. Landon, Charles Kettering, Clarence Darrow, Alanson B. Houghton, James H. McGill and J.M. Donaldson. Robert A. Bartlett, an arctic explorer, stayed at the hotel and presented a talk on his journeys.

As a private club in the 1950s, the hotel hosted an exclusive clientele of mostly Northerners during the winter months, changing owners in 1956 when it was bought for $300,000.

== Restoration ==
Plans to restore the hotel and add two independent wings to the building, creating "a hotel with 132 rooms, a spa, a ballroom and a 150-seat restaurant, all surrounded by lush landscaping and a 6-foot-tall masonry wall", developed in 2007, raising traffic concerns from some residents. An earlier plan for a larger redevelopment was rejected. Redevelopment of the Jazz Age hotel stalled in 2010 over legal disputes and a foreclosure proceeding.

On June 13, 2014, the non-profit organization, Taoist Tai Chi Society of the USA purchased the hotel for $2.8M to become its new national headquarters and a new international centre for its parent society, the Fung Loy Kok Institute of Taoism. The Society had proposed a two-phase development, renovation and restoration of the hotel building and grounds to suit the Society`s purposes, then construction of 27 three-story town homes behind the hotel on the landward half of the 5.2 acre property, but later withdrew the town homes phase. The amended development proposal was approved by the Dunedin City Commission on March 5, 2015. Later, the Tai Chi Society decided based on public opinion that they would revise the plans of how much space they would occupy. The final decision that was made stated that over 100 rooms would be used for a public hotel under the Marriott International Autograph Collection Hotels brand to preserve the building mainly as a hotel. A rooftop terrace and bar will also be incorporated with the plans to create a lively new addition to Dunedin.

== Cottage ==
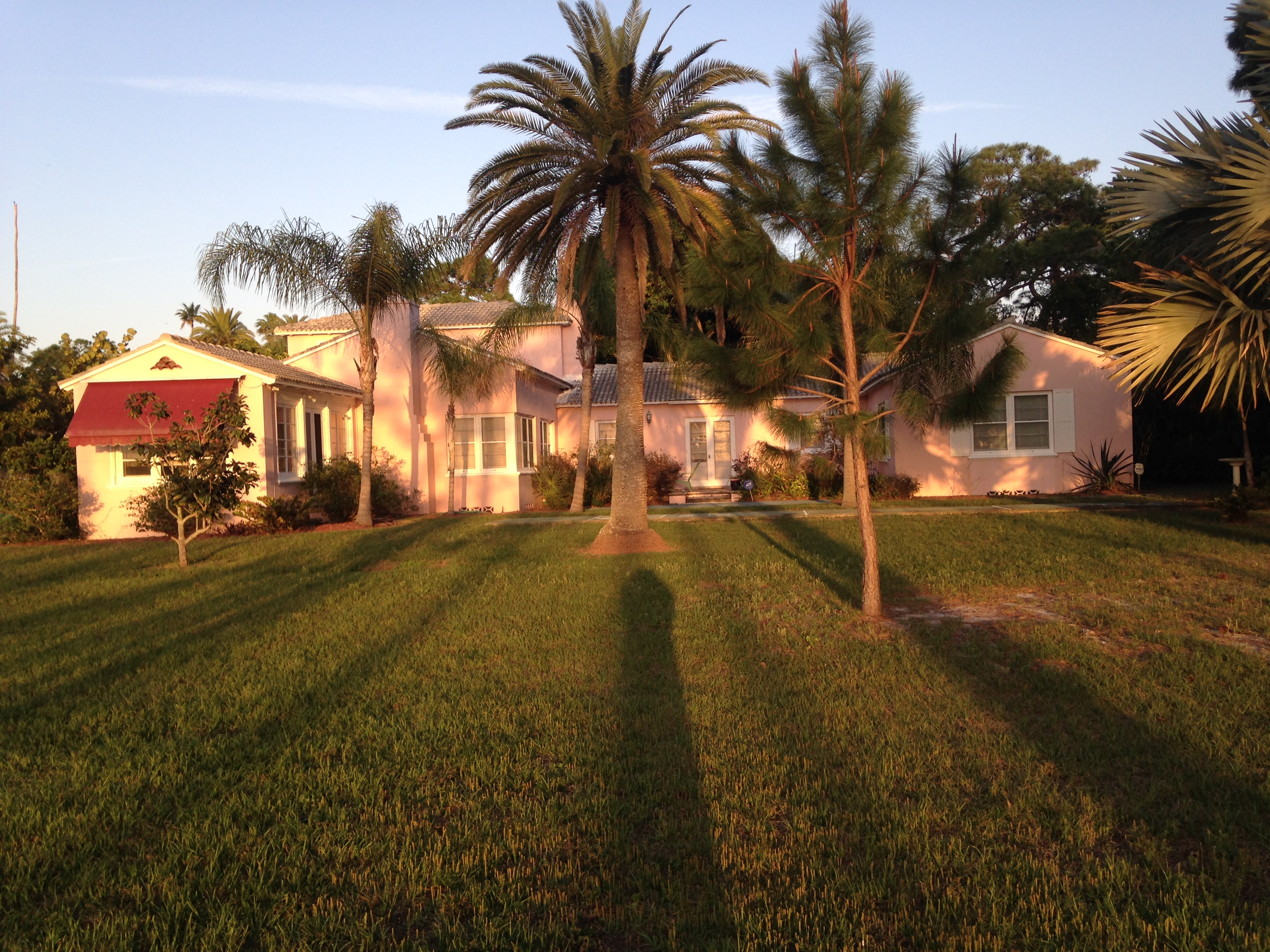
Fenway cottage at sunset

Fenway Cottage was built as part of the Fenway Hotel in Dunedin, Florida. Located adjacent to and south of the hotel, the cottage was built in 1938. A waterview property, the cottage faces the Saint Joseph Sound and the Intracoastal Waterway. Caledesi Island and Clearwater Beach skyline may be seen in the distance.

Seasonal rental of the cottage was common. Seasonal guests include Samuel H. Kress (1944, 1945, 1946) who started the S. H. Kress & Co chain of retail stores and James H McGill (1941), founder of McGill Manufacturing Co. of Valpariso, Indiana.

The cottage was acquired by Mainsail in 2016; previous owners include former Dunedin City Manager Richard A. Sexton, who lived there until his death in 1969, and insurance executive Dennis Andersen.

The house has 5 bedrooms and 4.5 baths. There are three bedrooms on the first floor; each bedroom has a private bath.

Servants' quarters were located on the second floor where there are two bedrooms and a shared bathroom.

Call buttons are located in each bedroom and throughout the house, which are connected to an annunciator panel in the kitchen. The call buttons could be used to summon the servants.

Fenway Cottage is adjacent to the Head Office of the Taoist Tai Chi Society of the USA (housed in the old Fenway Hotel), a block from the Pinellas Trail, and two blocks from Dunedin Stadium, the Spring Training home of the Toronto Blue Jays baseball team, as well as their minor league affiliate, the Dunedin Blue Jays. John Grant Hubbard Park, a linear park, runs along Edgewater Drive by the water in front of the property.
