= Willis S. Blatchley House =

- U.S. National Register of Historic Places
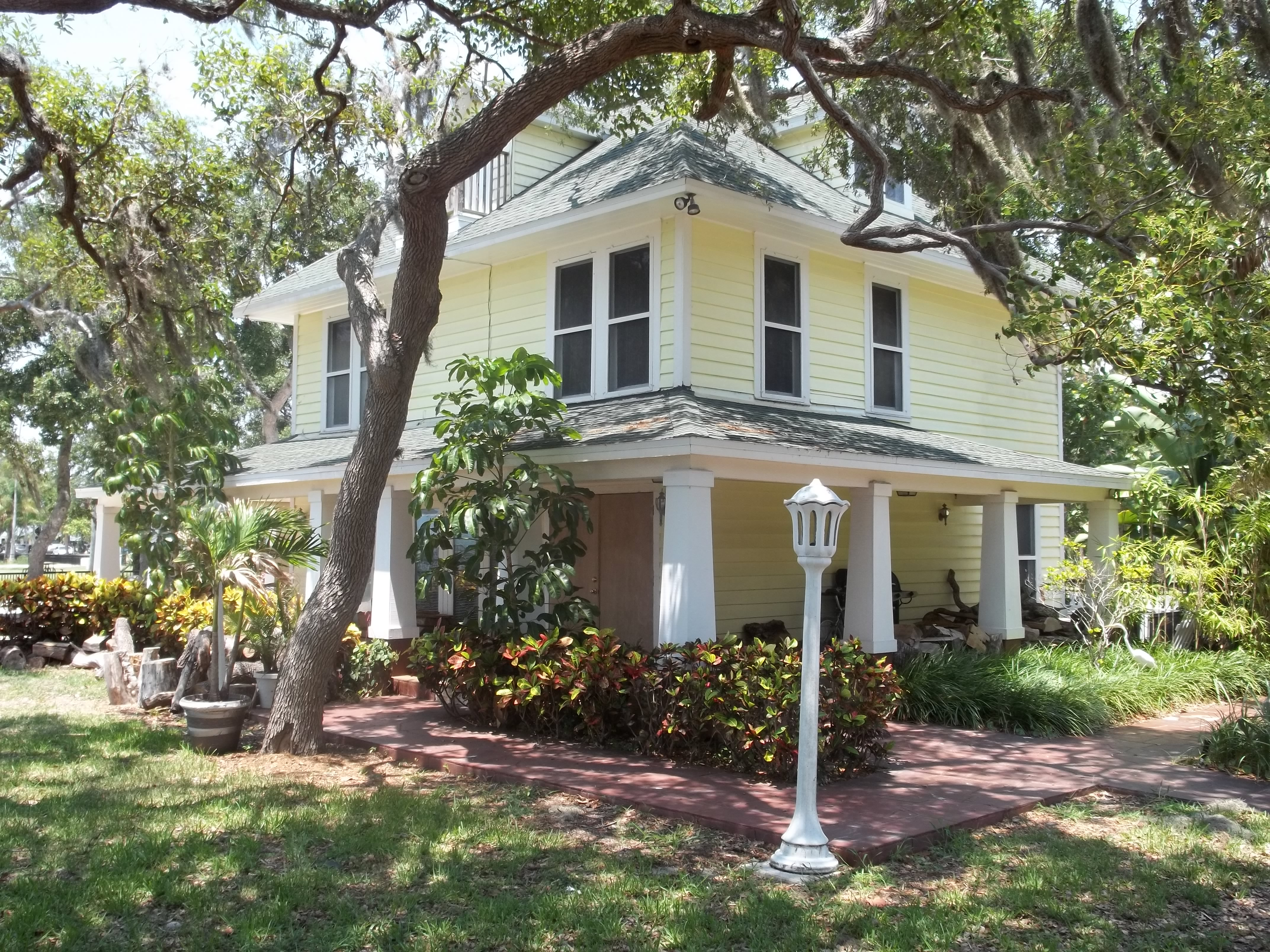

- Location within Florida Location within the United States
- Location: Dunedin, Florida
- Coordinates: 28°01′11″N 82°47′24″W
- NRHP reference No.: 09000747
- Added to NRHP: September 23, 2009

Willis S. Blatchley House is a national historic site located at 232 Lee Street, Dunedin, Florida in Pinellas County. It was the house on the American entomologist, malacologist and geologist Willis Blatchley.

It was added to the National Register of Historic Places on September 23, 2009.
