= Monoxia apicalis =

Scientific classification
- Kingdom: Animalia
- Phylum: Arthropoda
- Clade: Pancrustacea
- Class: Insecta
- Order: Coleoptera
- Suborder: Polyphaga
- Infraorder: Cucujiformia
- Family: Chrysomelidae
- Genus: Monoxia
- Species: M. apicalis

Binomial name
- Monoxia apicalis Blake, 1939

Species of beetle

Monoxia apicalis is a species of skeletonizing leaf beetle in the family Chrysomelidae. It is found in Central America and North America.
