= Englebert Complex =

Sports facility in Dunedin, Florida

Cecil P. Englebert Complex
- Interactive map of Cecil P. Englebert Complex
- Location: 1700 Solon Avenue, Dunedin, FL 34698
- Coordinates: 28°1′55.3″N 82°45′21.7″W
- Owner: City of Dunedin
- Operator: City of Dunedin Parks & Recreation Department
- Surface: grass

Construction
- Groundbreaking: 1977
- Opened: 1978

Tenants
- Toronto Blue Jays (training) (1977–present); Florida Complex League Blue Jays (1981–present)

The Bobby Mattick Training Center at Englebert Complex is a sports facility owned by the City of Dunedin, Florida. It is used primarily by the Toronto Blue Jays as a practice facility, and is home to their Rookie league affiliate, the Florida Complex League Blue Jays.

The facility opened in 1978 and named after City Commissioner and one time mayor Cecil P. Englebert, who lured the Toronto Blue Jays to the area.

The facility was renovated in 2002 for $14 million, expanding it from 17 to 23 acres (6.9 to 9.3 ha). The Blue Jays renamed the training facility the Bobby Mattick Training Center at Englebert Complex in 2003 after Bobby Mattick, who managed the Blue Jays from 1980 to 1981, and was employed by the team from 1976 until his death in 2004. The City of Dunedin objected to the new name, arguing that Mattick had no ties to the city.

The site features:

- training facilities
- team offices
- hitting cages
- five full fields
- one small field

Three other baseball diamonds on the north side belong to the Louis A. Vanech Recreation Complex, another city owned facility at 3051 Garrison Road; public parking is available along with access to the Englebert Complex.

The Jays' lease of the facility runs through 2017, but they have the option to extend it by an additional five years twice. After investigating possible alternative sites to host their spring training facility, the Jays negotiated an $81 million renovation to the stadium ($33.3 million) and Englebert Complex ($47.8 million), which they would contribute $20 million to (plus any cost overruns) with the rest coming from the state ($13.7 million), county ($41.7 million) and city ($5.6 million) governments. The stadium would be expanded from 5,500 to 8,500 seats. The lease agreement for the stadium lasts for 25 years, with the option to renew for a further 2 years five times. The City Commission approved the deal in November 2017. The club retains all revenue from sales at concessions and parking at the stadium, while they share revenue from naming rights with the city. The plan calls for the county to approve and a funding request to be submitted to the state by the end of 2017, with construction to begin in April 2018.
