= J. O. Douglas House =

Historic house in Florida, United States

- U.S. National Register of Historic Places
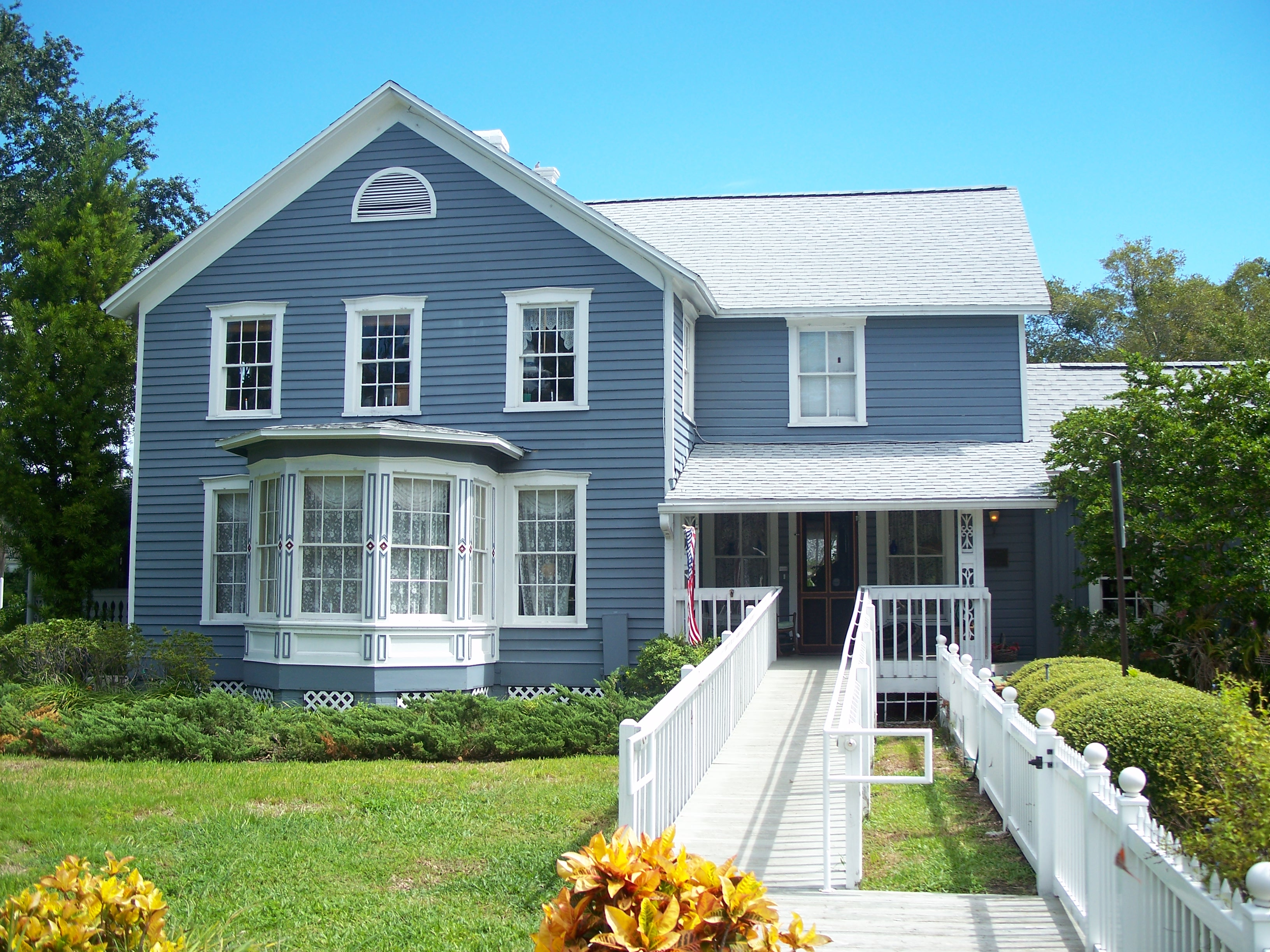

- Location within Florida
- Location: 209 Scotland Street, Dunedin, Florida
- Coordinates: 28°0′38″N 82°47′29″W
- Built: 1880
- Architect: J. O. Douglas
- Architectural style: Vernacular
- NRHP reference No.: 79000691
- Added to NRHP: November 29, 1979

The J. O. Douglas House is a historic house located at 209 Scotland Street in Dunedin, Florida. It is locally significant as one of the oldest buildings in the town and as the home of one of the owners of an important early store in the pioneer community, and it remains an excellent example of vernacular architecture in central Florida.

== Description and history ==
The 2 1/2-story house, built in 1880, has a T-shaped structure with a central hall flanked by two rooms to the east and one room to the west on the ground floor. The one-story extension (original kitchen) projects from the south (rear) elevation. Two dissimilar chimneys pierce the gable roof of the main portion of the house. Brick piers with lattice infill support the frame structure covered with horizontal siding. Aside from the flat sawn balusters, posts and brackets on the porches, the very simple window treatments, and the projecting bay, the house is simply a five bay rectangular structure with a "Tee" wing addition evidencing no discernable style.

It was added to the National Register of Historic Places on November 29, 1979.
