= Monoxia brisleyi =

Scientific classification
- Kingdom: Animalia
- Phylum: Arthropoda
- Clade: Pancrustacea
- Class: Insecta
- Order: Coleoptera
- Suborder: Polyphaga
- Infraorder: Cucujiformia
- Family: Chrysomelidae
- Genus: Monoxia
- Species: M. brisleyi

Binomial name
- Monoxia brisleyi Blake, 1939

Species of beetle

Monoxia brisleyi is a species of skeletonizing leaf beetle in the family Chrysomelidae. It is found in North America.
