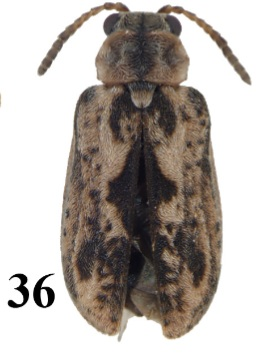

Scientific classification
- Kingdom: Animalia
- Phylum: Arthropoda
- Clade: Pancrustacea
- Class: Insecta
- Order: Coleoptera
- Suborder: Polyphaga
- Infraorder: Cucujiformia
- Family: Chrysomelidae
- Genus: Yingabruxia
- Species: Y. sordida

Binomial name
- Yingabruxia sordida (J. L. LeConte, 1858)

Synonyms
- Galleruca sordida LeConte, 1858; Monoxia sordida

= Yingabruxia sordida =

Species of beetle

Yingabruxia sordida is a species of skeletonizing leaf beetle in the family Chrysomelidae. It is found in Central America and North America, where it has been recorded from British Columbia, South Dakota, Nevada, California, Utah, Colorado, Arizona, New Mexico, Texas, as well as Baja California.
