= Autograph Collection =

Group of hotels within the Marriott International portfolio

Autograph Collection Hotels
- Industry: Hospitality
- Founded: 2009
- Headquarters: Washington, D.C.
- Number of locations: 199 hotels (June 30, 2020)
- Area served: Global
- Parent: Marriott International
- Website: www.autograph-hotels.marriott.com

Autograph Collection is an American group of independent upper-upscale to luxury hotels within the Marriott International portfolio. The properties are independently owned and operated under the Autograph Collection name.

== History ==
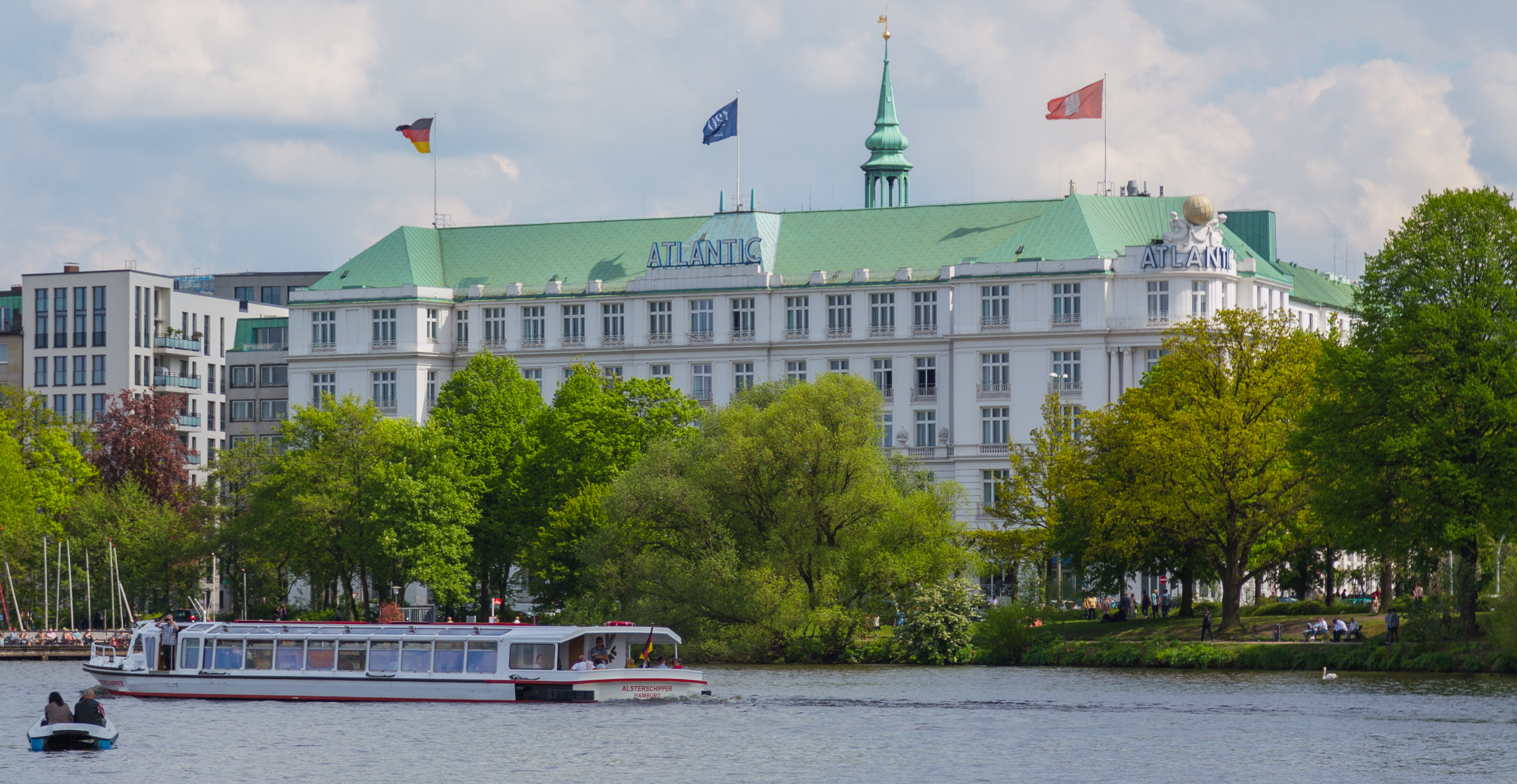
Hotel Atlantic in Hamburg, Germany

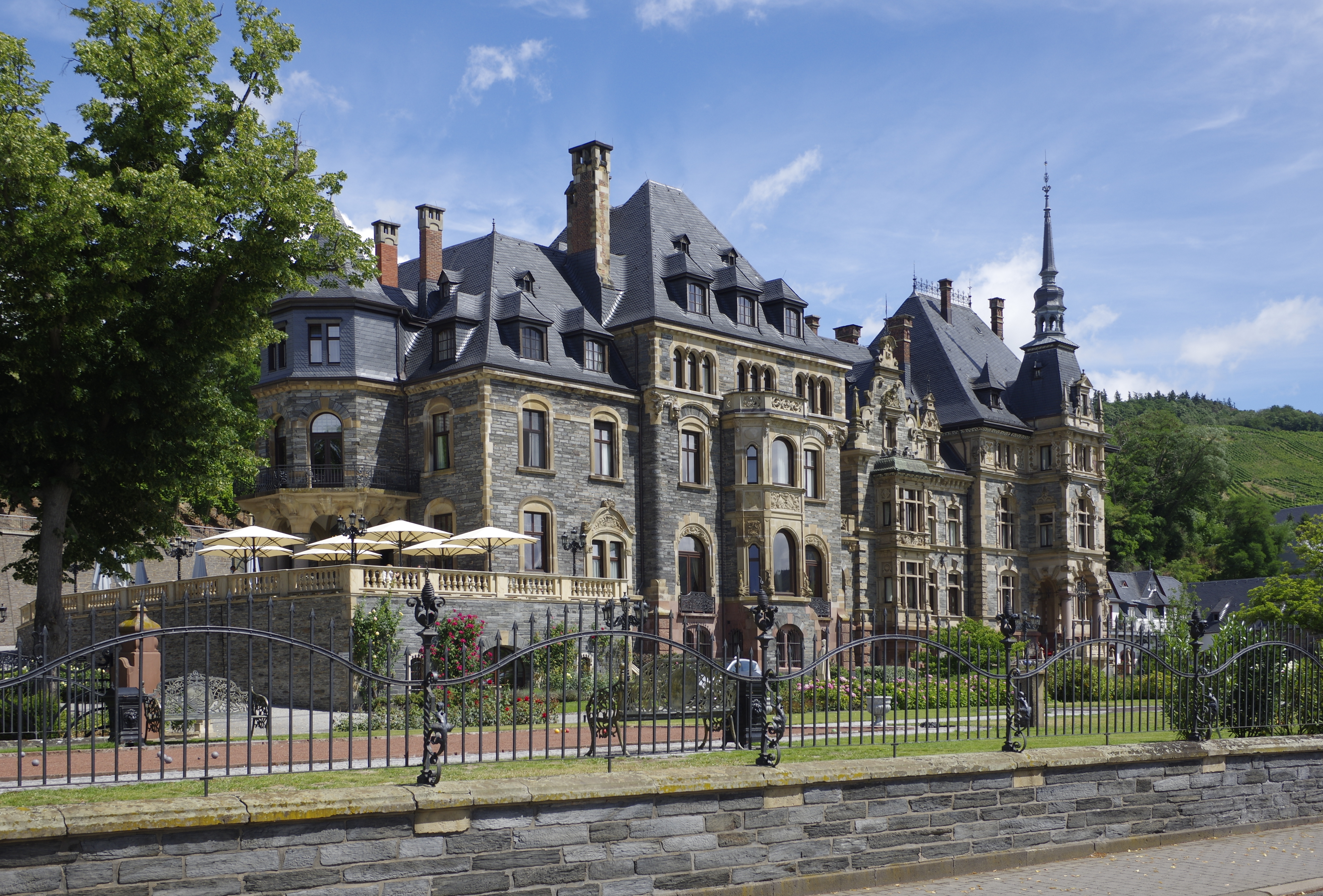
Schloss Lieser in Germany

To grow in the post-2008 economic downturn, Marriott, known for its rigid uniformity, was willing to relax this stipulation to draw independent unique hotels to its network of franchised properties. In 2010, Marriott approached Richard Kessler, an independent hotelier and former CEO of Days Inn, to incorporate the seven Kessler boutique properties into its system, under a yet unnamed new brand.

In 2006, Kessler had dropped the Westin brand affiliation from his downtown Orlando hotel to operate independently. Initially reluctant, Kessler came to an acceptable arrangement. The hotels would operate autonomously, keeping their names and identities. The Autograph Collection launched that year, with the Kessler properties forming the bulk of the hotel inventory.

The new name highlighted not a brand, but a collection of hotels. The Leading Hotels of the World, targeting high-end customers looking for unique hotel experiences, had long dominated this market.

Over time, the growth emphasis shifted from adding existing properties to proposals and new builds that incorporated the desired features.

Brand launches were Ascend by Choice (2008), Autograph by Marriott (2010), Curio by Hilton (2014), Best Western Premier (2014), Unbound by Hyatt (2016), and Trademark by Wyndham (2017). Marriott continues to promote growth in its three soft brands, The Luxury Collection, Tribute Portfolio, and Autograph.

In January 2017, Autograph began the Independent Film Initiative at the Sundance Film Festival with the Autograph Collection Hotels & The Black List Sundance Social Space. The Annual Black List is a list of screenplays that require financing. Autograph has its own indie film channel for hotel guests.

The Autograph Collection comprises a portfolio of 4- and 5-star properties.

== Accommodations ==
=== Historical ===
Year	Type	US	Non-US	Total
2010	Properties	13	0	13
2010	Rooms	3,828	0	3,828
2011	Properties	17	10	27
2011	Rooms	5,207	898	6,105
2012	Properties	24	13	37
2012	Rooms	6,609	1,404	8,013
2013	Properties	32	24	56
2013	Rooms	8,410	3,053	11,463
2014	Properties	44	31	75
2014	Rooms	10,082	7,428	17,510

=== From 2015 ===
		North America	Europe	Middle E. & Africa	Asia & Pacific	Caribbean Latin Am.	Total
2015	Properties	55	30	1	3	6	95
2015	Rooms	13,135	4,344	446	785	4,098	22,808
2016	Properties	64	33	2	4	8	111
2016	Rooms	14,299	4,710	532	1,195	4,203	24,939
2017	Properties	78	38	3	7	9	135
2017	Rooms	17,107	5,403	1,102	1,895	4,313	29,820
2018	Properties	95	46	8	8	9	166
2018	Rooms	20,218	6,466	1,738	2,167	4,313	34,902
2019	Properties	108	53	9	9	13	192
2019	Rooms	22,463	7,165	1,906	2,364	3,751	37,649
2020	Properties	123	54	7	12	13	209
2020	Rooms	25,449	6,468	1,640	3,245	3,751	40,553
2021	Properties	136	58	8	16	35	253
2021	Rooms	27,807	7,298	1,629	3,706	11,154	51,594
2022	Properties	146	68	13	19	36	282
2022	Rooms	29,678	8,482	2,344	4,455	12,158	57,117
2023	Properties	153	77	15	22	37	304
2023	Rooms	31,321	10,010	2,402	4,703	12,448	60,884

== Properties ==
As of June 30, 2020, the Autograph Collection consisted of 199 hotels in over 32 countries, with another 95 hotels with 16,941 rooms in its pipeline.

=== Canada ===
- The Algonquin Resort St. Andrews By-The-Sea, St Andrews, NB
- Humaniti, Montreal, QC
- Hotel Saskatchewan, Regina, SK
- The Douglas, Vancouver BC

=== Curaçao ===
- The Pyrmont, Willemstad Curaçao

=== Germany ===
- Hotel am Steinplatz in Berlin
- The Falkenstein Grand in Königstein im Taunus
- The Hotel Atlantic in Hamburg
- Villa Rothschild in Königstein im Taunus
- Hotel Luc in Berlin

=== Ireland ===
- Mount Juliet Estate in Kilkenny
- Shelbourne Hotel in Dublin
- The Powerscourt Hotel in Wicklow

=== Japan ===
- The Prince Sakura Tower in Tokyo
- The Osaka Station Hotel in Osaka

=== Mexico ===
- The Royalton Splash in Cancún

=== South Korea ===
- The Plaza Seoul in Seoul

=== United Kingdom ===
- The Glasshouse in Edinburgh
- The Threadneedles Hotel in London
- The University Arms Hotel in Cambridge

=== United States ===
- The Adolphus Hotel in Dallas, Texas,
- The Algonquin Hotel Times Square in Manhattan, New York City, New York
- The Arrowhead Springs Hotel and Spa in Lake Arrowhead, California
- The Hotel Blackhawk in Davenport, Iowa
- The Blackstone Hotel in Chicago, Illinois
- The Brown Palace Hotel in Denver, Colorado
- Hotel Carmichael in Carmel, Indiana
- The Casa Monica Hotel in St. Augustine, Florida
- The Castle Hotel in Orlando, Florida
- The Cosmopolitan of Las Vegas in Las Vegas, Nevada
- The Cloudveil in Jackson, Wyoming
- The Current Iowa in Davenport, Iowa
- The Historic Davenport in Spokane, Washington
- The Daytona in Daytona Beach, Fl.
- The Draftsman in Charlottesville, Virginia
- The Hotel Drover in Fort Worth, Texas
- The Hotel Duval in Tallahassee, Florida
- The Éilan Hotel & Spa in San Antonio, Texas,
- The Fenway Hotel in Dunedin, Florida
- The Grand Hotel in Fairhope, Alabama
- The Henry in Dearborn, Michigan
- The Hi-Lo Hotel in Portland, Oregon
- The Hotel Cleveland in Cleveland, Ohio
- The Hotel Icon in Houston, Texas,
- The Lexington Hotel in New York City
- The Lytle Park Hotel in Cincinnati, Ohio
- The Mauna Kea Beach Hotel in Kohala Coast, Hawaii
- The Mayflower Hotel in Washington, DC
- Hotel Metro in Milwaukee, Wisconsin
- The Metropolitan at The 9 in Cleveland, Ohio
- The Morrison House in Alexandria, Virginia
- The Paso Del Norte in El Paso, Texas
- The Press Hotel in Portland, Maine
- The Stella Hotel in Bryan, Texas.
- The Union Station Hotel in Nashville, Tennessee
- The National in Oklahoma City, Oklahoma
- Hotel Park City in Park City, Utah

=== Vietnam ===
- The Vinpearl Landmark 81 in Ho Chi Minh City
