= Dunedin Fine Art Center =

Museum in Dunedin, Florida

Coordinates: 28.0375°N 82.7741°W

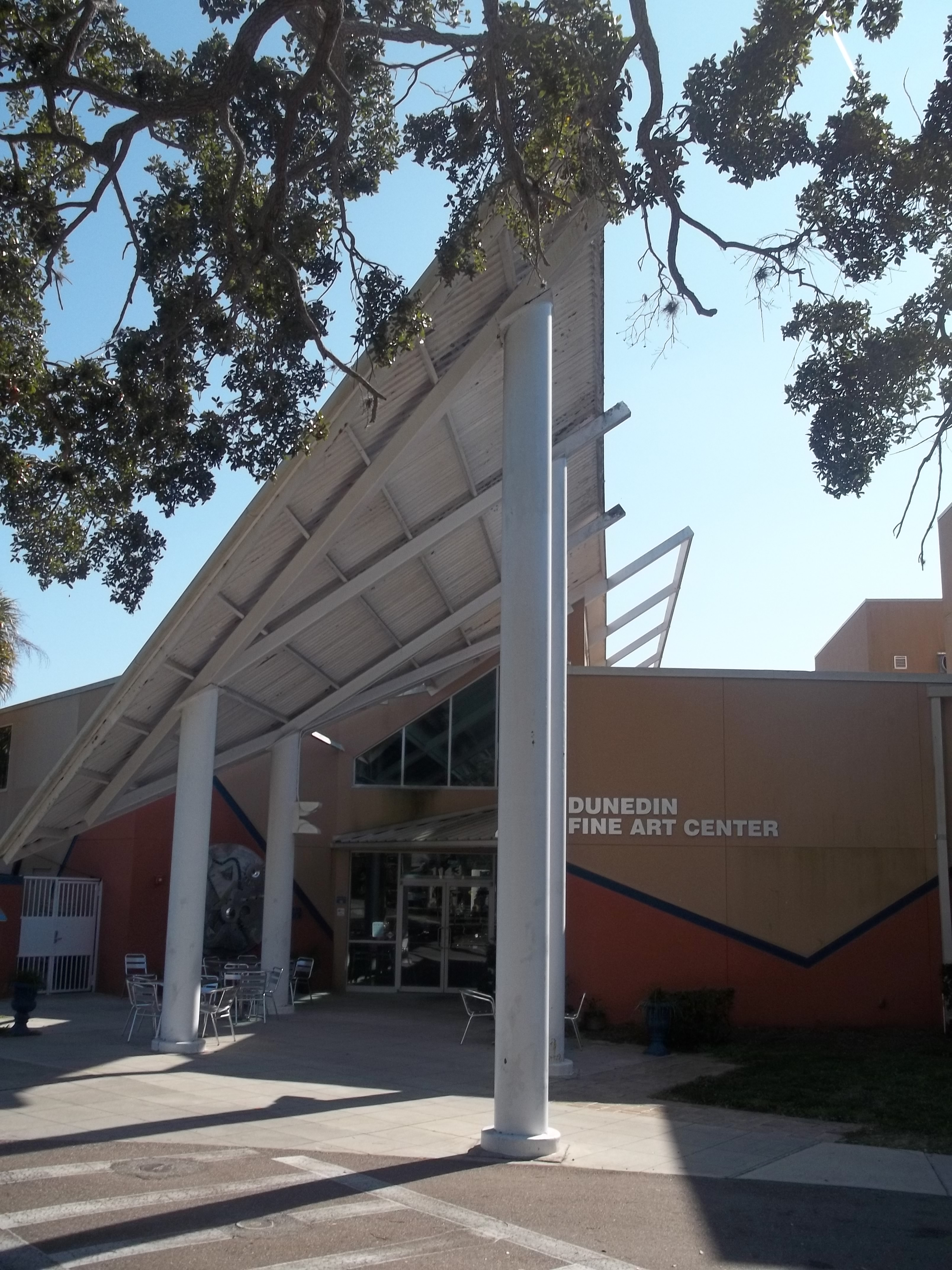

The Dunedin Fine Arts Center (DFAC) hosts exhibitions, festivals, classes, and workshop space in Dunedin, Florida. The center was temporary closed due to COVID-19 pandemic and was re-opened on June 1, 2020.
