= Willis Blatchley =

American entomologist

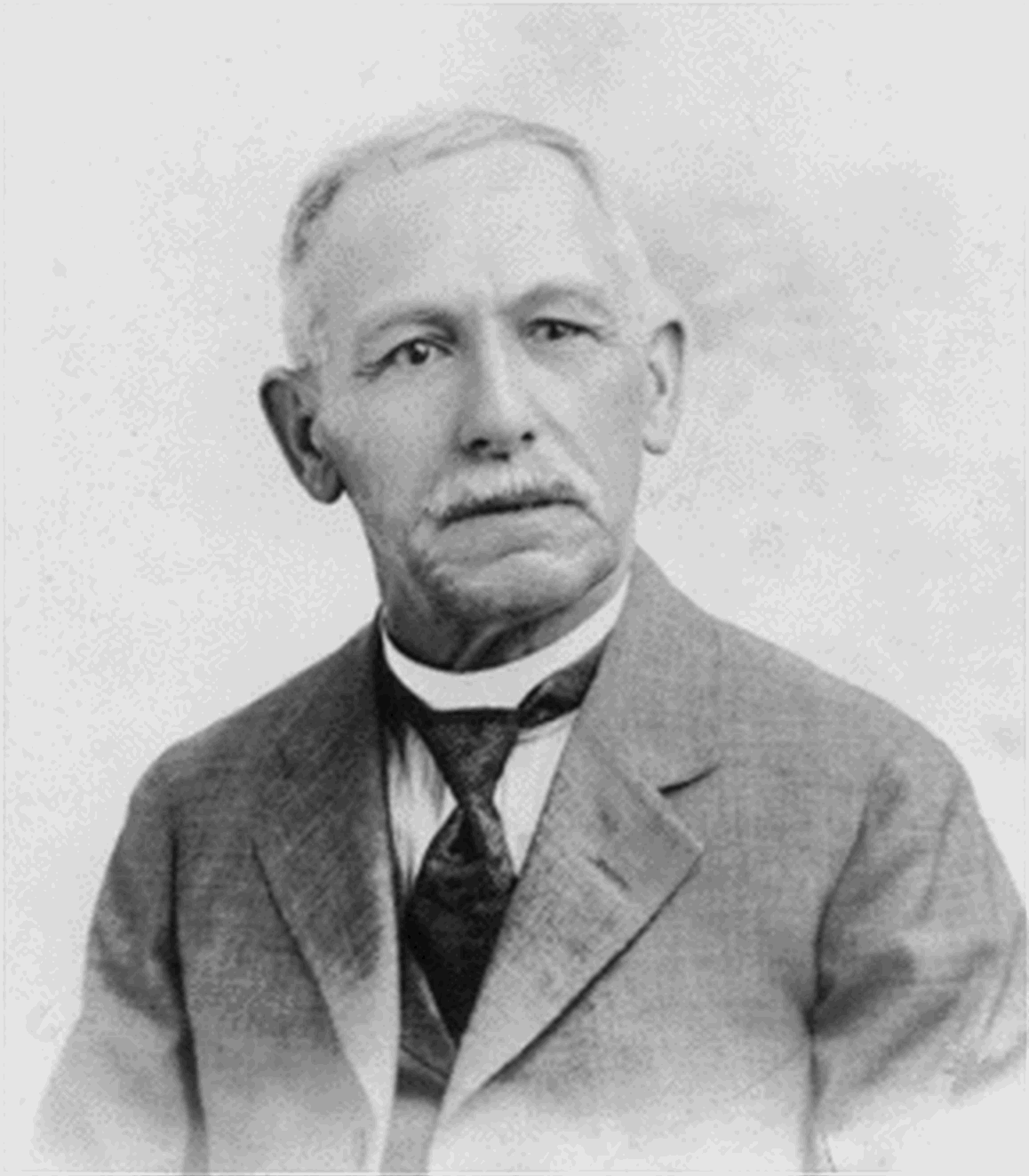
Willis Stanley Blatchley

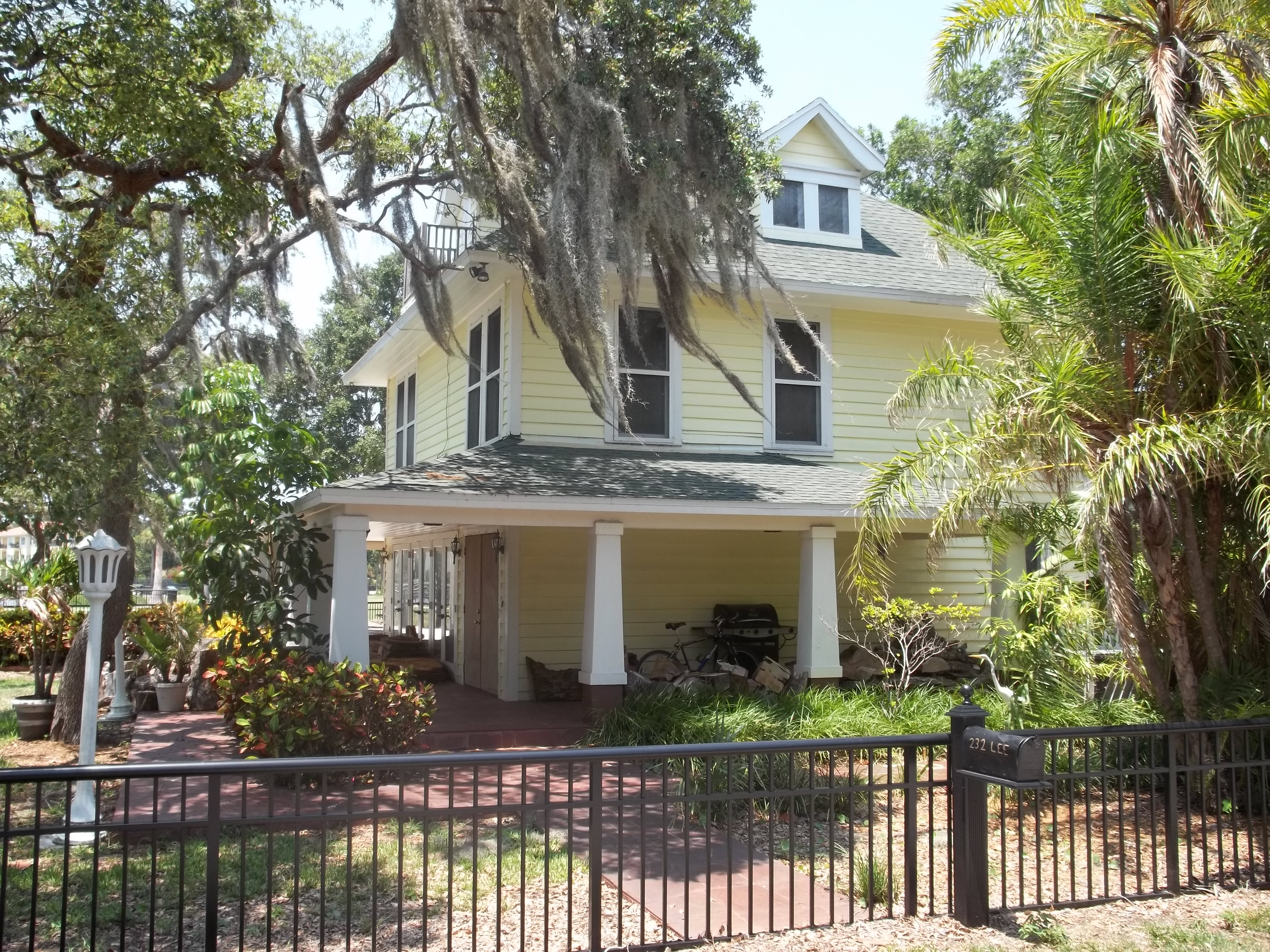
The Willis S. Blatchley House in Dunedin, Florida

Willis Stanley Blatchley (October 6, 1859, North Madison, Connecticut – May 28, 1940, Indianapolis, Indiana) was an American entomologist, malacologist, geologist, and author. His studies included Coleoptera, Orthoptera, Hemiptera, and the freshwater molluscs of Indiana. Blatchley described several taxa. His home in Dunedin, Florida, the Willis S. Blatchley House, is listed on the National Register of Historic Places.

He was born in Connecticut and his parents moved to Indiana in 1860 a year later. He attended high school in Bainbridge and enrolled at Indiana University in 1883, graduating with a B.A. in 1887 and an M.A. in 1891. There he worked under ichthyologist David Starr Jordan and geologist John Casper Branner. Blatchley received an honorary degree (LL.D.) from Indiana University in 1921.

From 1887–1893 he taught at Terre Haute High School where he was Head of the Science Department from 1887–1893. From 1894–1910 he was State Geologist for Indiana.

After being defeated for re-election in 1911, he retired from public office, but continued his natural history work as an amateur. Though much of his work focused on the fauna of Indiana, he traveled to Arkansas, Alaska, Florida, Canada, Mexico, and South America (1922–23).

Blatchley married Clara A. Fordice (or Fordyce?, 1854–1928), of Russellville, Indiana, on May 2, 1882. They had two sons, Raymond Silliman Blatchley (February 11, 1883 – September 27, 1953, Los Angeles--biography) and Ralph F. Blatchley (1885–1955, Dunedin, Florida).

== Bibliography ==
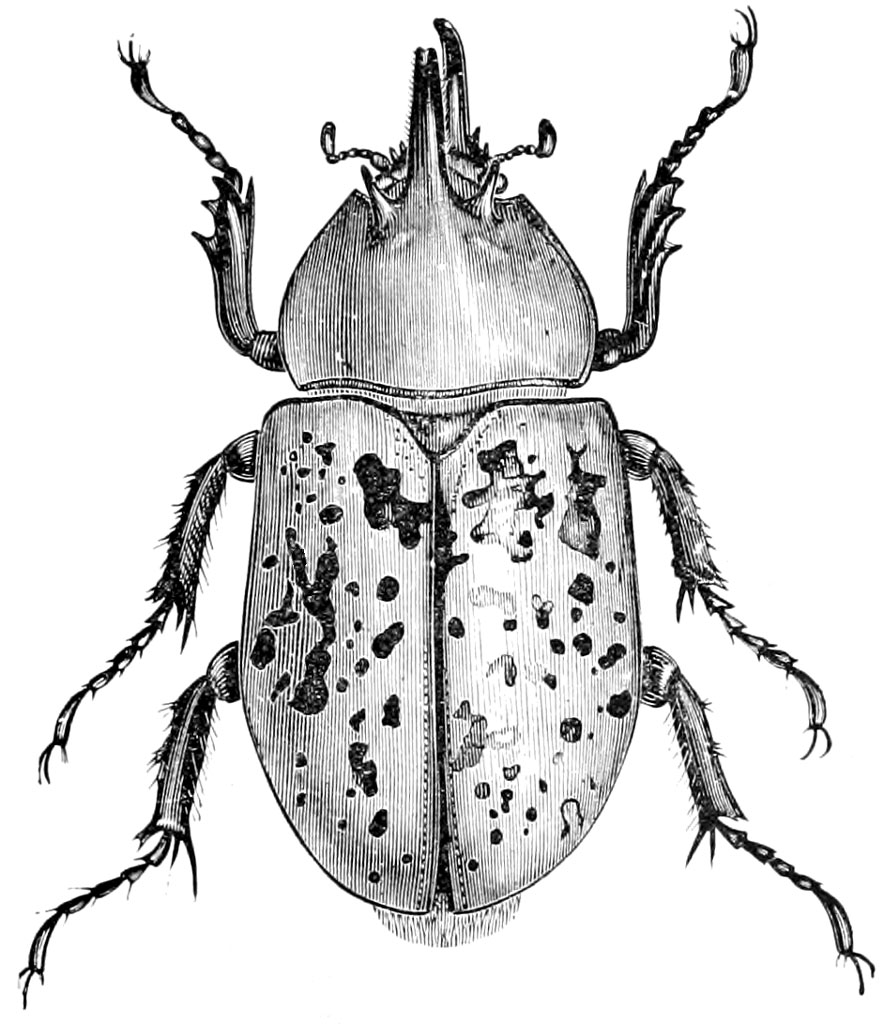
Dynastes tityus plate from Coleoptera of Indiana

- An illustrated descriptive catalogue of the Coleoptera or beetles (exclusive of the Rhynchophora) known to occur in Indiana. (1910)
- Orthoptera of Northeastern America. (1920)
- Heteroptera of Eastern North America. (1926)
- 11 papers (1927–1930) in the Florida Entomologist) on the Scarabaeidae of Florida.
- The Indiana Weed Book
- Boulder Reveries
- Gleanings from Nature
- A nature wooing at Ormond by the sea
- Gold and Diamonds in Indiana
- Woodland Idyls
- South America As I Saw It, The observations of a naturalist
- In Days Agone: Notes on the Fauna and Flora of Subtropical Florida in the Days When Most of Its Area was a Primeval Wilderness
- Indiana Geology and Natural Resources
- Orthoptera of Northeastern America with Essential Reference to the Faunas of Indiana and Florida
- Heteroptera Or True Bugs of Eastern North America; with Especial Reference to the Faunas of Indiana and Florida
- MY NATURE NOOK or Notes on the Natural History of the Vicinity of Dunedin, Florida.
- The fishes of Indiana,: With descriptions, notes on habits and distribution in the state
- A Catalogue of the Butterflies Known to Occur in Indiana
