= Dunedin, Florida =

- City
- City of Dunedin
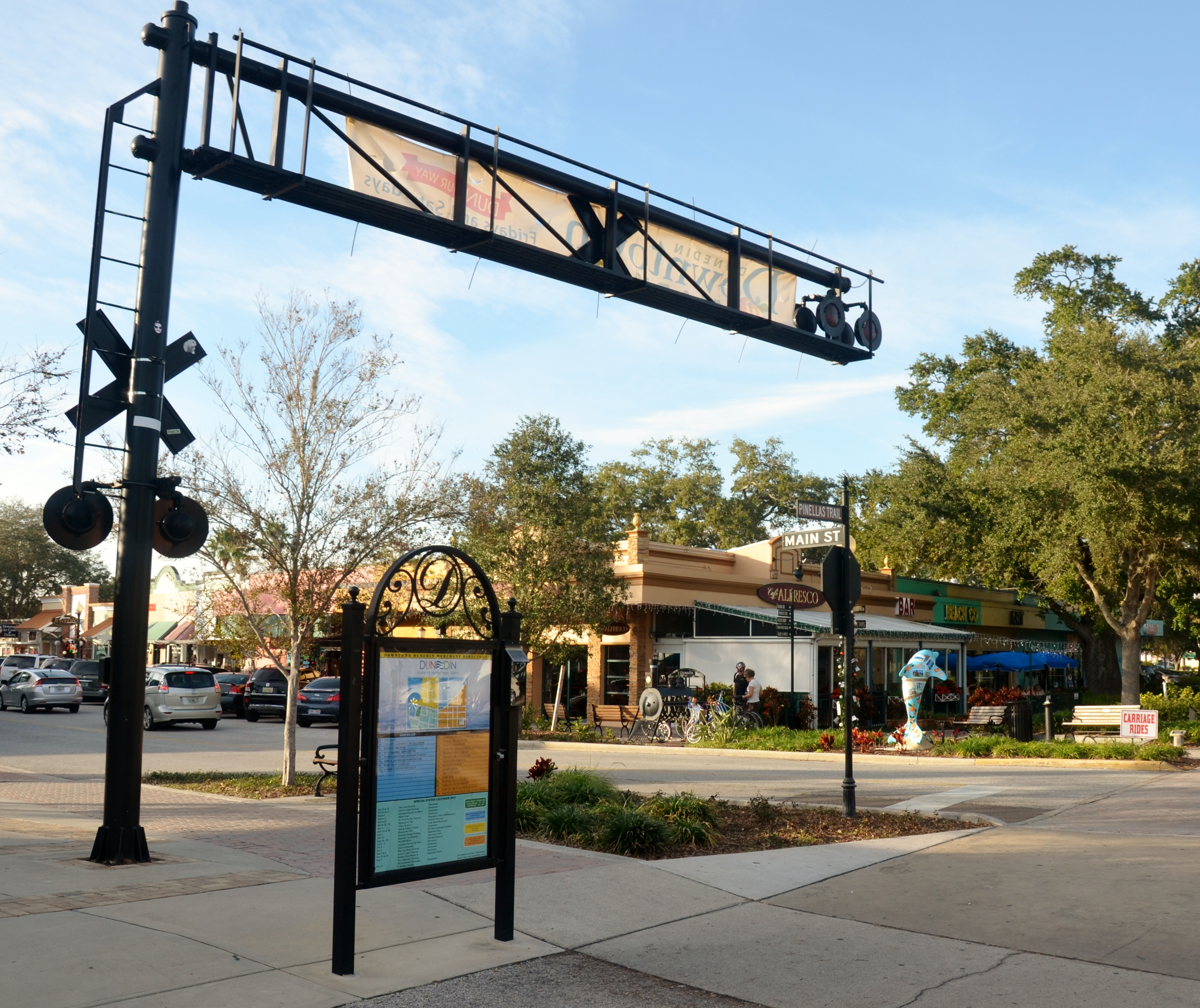
- Downtown Dunedin

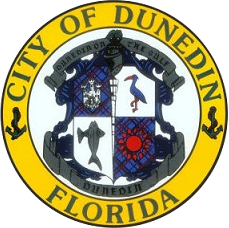
- Flag Seal Logo
- Motto: "Dunedin on the Gulf"
- Location in Pinellas County and the state of Florida
- Coordinates: 28°1′31″N 82°46′31″W
- Country: United States
- State: Florida
- County: Pinellas
- Settled (Jonesboro): 1850
- Incorporated (Town of Dunedin): 1899
- Incorporated (City of Dunedin): 1926

Government
  - Type: Commission–Manager

Area
  - Total: 22.94 sq mi (59.42 km^{2})
  - Land: 10.41 sq mi (26.96 km^{2})
  - Water: 12.53 sq mi (32.46 km^{2})
- Elevation: 0 ft (0 m)

Population (2020)
  - Total: 36,068
  - Estimate (2023): 35,930
  - Density: 3,465.1/sq mi (1,337.87/km^{2})
- Time zone: UTC-5 (Eastern (EST))
  - Summer (DST): UTC-4 (EDT)
- ZIP codes: 34697-34698
- Area code: 727
- FIPS code: 12-18575
- GNIS feature ID: 2403516
- Website: www.dunedin.gov

Dunedin (/dəˈniːdɪn/ də-NEE-din) is a city in Pinellas County, Florida, United States. The name comes from Dùn Èideann, the Scottish Gaelic name for Edinburgh, the capital city of Scotland. Dunedin is part of the Tampa–St. Petersburg–Clearwater metropolitan area and is the fifth largest city in Pinellas County. The population was 36,068 as of the 2020 census.

Dunedin is home to several beaches, including Dunedin Causeway, Honeymoon Island, and Caladesi Island State Park, which is consistently rated among the best beaches in the world. Dunedin is one of the few open waterfront communities from Sarasota to Cedar Key where buildings do not completely obscure the view of the Intracoastal Waterway and the Gulf of Mexico beyond; a 1-mile (1.6 km) stretch of Edgewater Drive (also known as Alternate US 19) south of downtown offers views of St. Joseph Sound, Clearwater Beach, and Caladesi Island. Downtown Clearwater and Clearwater Beach are a 6-mile (10 km) drive south on Edgewater.

== History ==
Richard L. Garrison was the first person given a land grant in Dunedin in 1850. The settlement was originally named "Jonesboro" by George Jones, the owner of the area mercantile. Two Scotsmen, J.O. Douglas and James Somerville, later named the settlement Dunedin after applying for the first post office in northern Pinellas County. The name is taken from Scottish Gaelic Dùn Èideann, the Scottish Gaelic for Edinburgh. With a dock built to accommodate larger sailing vessels, Dunedin became an important trading center and at one time it had the largest fleet of sailing vessels in the state.

In 1899, it was incorporated as the "Town of Dunedin" mainly as a response to numerous complaints about pigs running rampant in the settlement, leading to a still-standing ban on livestock within city limits. By 1913, the town had a population of only 350. It became incorporated as the "City of Dunedin" in 1926.

=== Dunedin and the Roebling Alligator ===
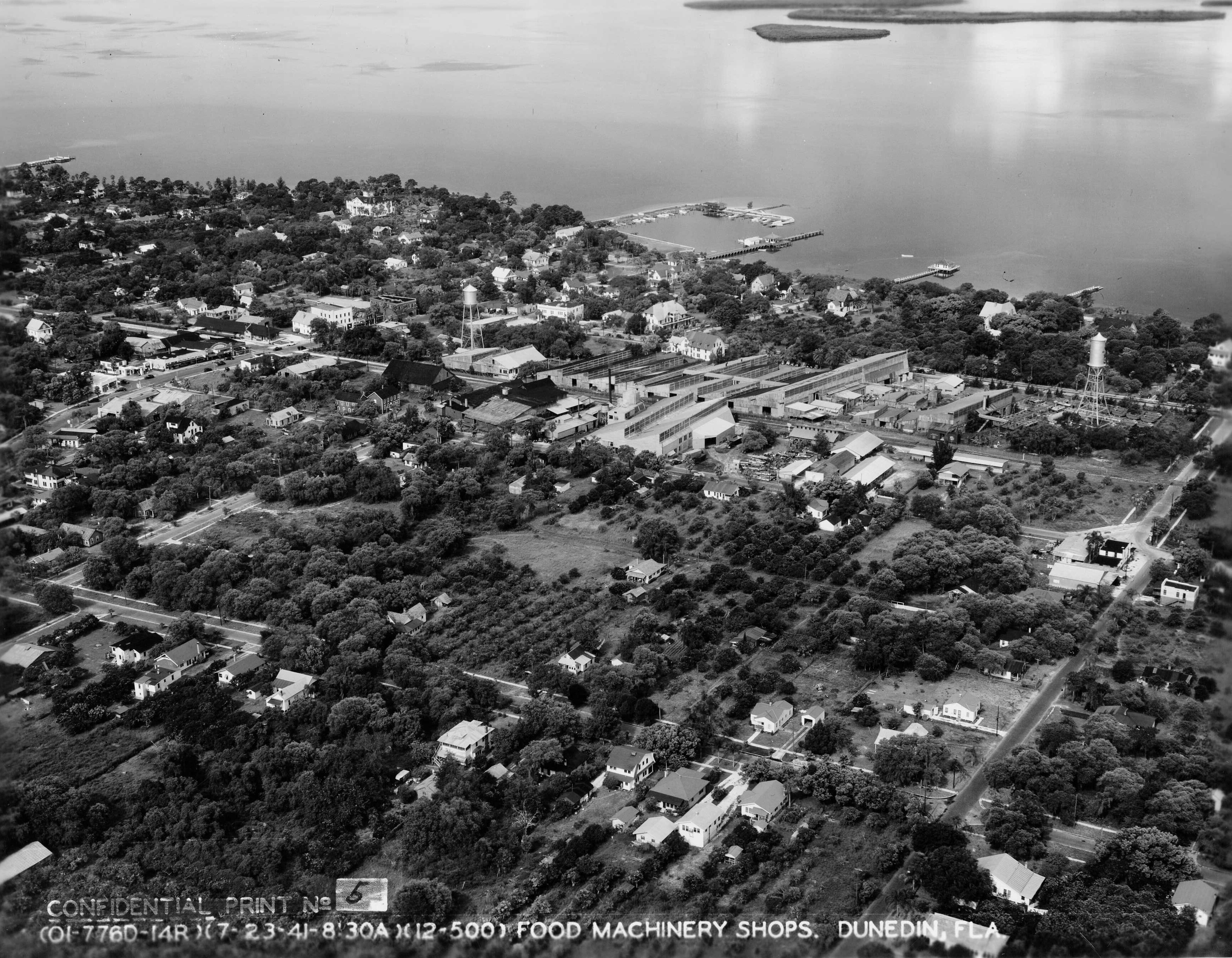
Food Machinery Shops, 1941

During and shortly before World War II the Food Machinery Corporation (FMC) factory in Dunedin (now demolished) was the primary site for the production of the Landing Vehicle Tracked (LVT) developed by FMC Dunedin's Engineers and Donald Roebling of Clearwater from Roebling's own Alligator.

Initial training on the LVT was done at the FMC factory under the auspices of the first Amphibian Tractor School, led by Major William W. Davies. Until barracks and maintenance facilities were completed, the school and its students were housed in the Hotel Dunedin. After training, the marines from the first Amphibian Tractor School were sent to flesh out the 1st Amphibian Tractor Battalion, which has served with distinction since. In mid-1944, the marine unit in Dunedin was transferred to Camp Pendleton, California.

== Geography ==
According to the United States Census Bureau, the city has a total area of 28.2 square miles (73 km^{2}). 10.4 square miles (27 km^{2}) of it is land and 17.8 square miles (46 km^{2}) of it (63.20%) is water.

Dunedin is bordered by the city of Clearwater to the south and east, the Gulf of Mexico to the west, and by Palm Harbor (a census-designated place and unincorporated community of Pinellas County) to the north.

=== Neighborhoods ===
- Amberlea
- Barrington Hills
- Braemoor
- Curlew Landings
- Dunedin Mobile Manor
- Fairway Estates
- Golden Acres
- Golden Crest
- Heather Ridge
- Lake Haven
- Lake Highlander
- New Athens City
- Osprey Place
- Piper's Glen
- Ranchwood Estates
- Spanish Acres
- Spanish Place
- Spanish Trails
- Spring Lakes
- Spring Lake South
- Stirling Heights
- Trails West
- Virginia Crossing
- Waterford Crossing
- Weathersfield

=== Climate ===
The climate in this area is characterized by hot, humid summers and generally mild winters. According to the Köppen climate classification, the City of Dunedin has a humid subtropical climate zone (Cfa).

== Demographics ==
Historical population
Census	Pop.	Note	%±
1900	113		—
1910	256		126.5%
1920	642		150.8%
1930	1,435		123.5%
1940	1,758		22.5%
1950	3,202		82.1%
1960	8,444		163.7%
1970	17,639		108.9%
1980	30,203		71.2%
1990	34,012		12.6%
2000	35,691		4.9%
2010	35,321		−1.0%
2020	36,068		2.1%
2023 (est.)	35,930	▼	−0.4%
U.S. Decennial Census

=== Racial and ethnic composition ===
Dunedin racial composition (Hispanics excluded from racial categories) (NH = Non-Hispanic)
Race	Pop 2010	Pop 2020	% 2010	% 2020
White (NH)	30,874	30,451	87.41%	84.43%
Black or African American (NH)	1,096	926	3.10%	2.57%
Native American or Alaska Native (NH)	74	67	0.21%	0.19%
Asian (NH)	568	615	1.61%	1.71%
Pacific Islander or Native Hawaiian (NH)	50	35	0.14%	0.10%
Some other race (NH)	76	148	0.22%	0.41%
Two or more races/Multiracial (NH)	490	1,277	1.39%	3.54%
Hispanic or Latino (any race)	2,093	2,549	5.93%	7.07%
Total	35,321	36,068		

=== 2020 census ===
As of the 2020 census, Dunedin had a population of 36,068. The median age was 56.7 years. 11.4% of residents were under the age of 18 and 34.0% were 65 years of age or older. For every 100 females there were 85.9 males, and for every 100 females age 18 and over there were 84.4 males age 18 and over.

100.0% of residents lived in urban areas, while 0.0% lived in rural areas.

There were 18,401 households in Dunedin, of which 14.0% had children under the age of 18 living in them. Of all households, 40.4% were married-couple households, 19.4% were households with a male householder and no spouse or partner present, and 33.2% were households with a female householder and no spouse or partner present. About 40.2% of all households were made up of individuals and 22.0% had someone living alone who was 65 years of age or older.

There were 21,905 housing units, of which 16.0% were vacant. The homeowner vacancy rate was 2.0% and the rental vacancy rate was 9.3%.

Racial composition as of the 2020 census
Race	Number	Percent
White	31,116	86.3%
Black or African American	968	2.7%
American Indian and Alaska Native	101	0.3%
Asian	622	1.7%
Native Hawaiian and Other Pacific Islander	36	0.1%
Some other race	707	2.0%
Two or more races	2,518	7.0%
Hispanic or Latino (of any race)	2,549	7.1%

=== 2020 estimates ===
According to 2020 estimates, there were 9,370 families residing in the city. There were 3,335 veterans living in the city. 8.4% were foreign born persons. 3.3% of the population were under 5 years old, 10.6% were under 18 years old, and 36.3% were 65 years and older. 54.3% were female persons. There were 1.95 people per household.

In 2020, the median value of owner-occupied housing units was $248,200. The median gross rent was $1,178. 92.1% of households had a computer and 84.0% had a broadband internet subscription. 94.7% of the population aged 25 years or older had a high school degree or higher. 36.3% of the population aged 25 years or older had a bachelor's degree or higher. The median household income was $55,729. The per capita income for 12 months was $39,646. 9.7% of the population lived below the poverty threshold.

=== 2010 census ===
As of the 2010 United States census, there were 35,321 people, 16,431 households, and 9,257 families residing in the city.

== Local government ==
=== Administration ===
The City of Dunedin currently operates under a nonpartisan commissioner-manager form of government. The commission comprises four commissioners and a mayor, who are elected by the registered voters under a staggered system.

The chief executive officer, known as the city manager, oversees the ten departments and the annual budget.

The city government is made up of ten departments with various divisions and sections. The departments are Administration, Human Resources, Information Services, Public Works, Parks & Recreation, Fire, Library, Community Services, Economical Development, Planning/Development and Finance. The Community Redevelopment Agency (CRA) oversees downtown projects and the needs of downtown Dunedin merchants and tourism.

Dunedin boasts an extensive Volunteer Services section, and enables all citizens the chance to have their opinions expressed and tended to. Currently, there are 39 boards and committees that serve as advisory groups to the city manager and the City Commission.

=== Law enforcement and fire ===
Dunedin Fire Department has 48 firefighters split into 16 members over three shifts. The department has 3 fire stations providing fire protection for Dunedin.

Pinellas County Sheriff Office's North District Patrol provides law enforcement for Dunedin.

== Economy ==
Dunedin previously hosted an office of Nielsen Media Research. In 2003, the company consolidated its employees in a new complex in Oldsmar, Florida, with workers from Dunedin and other areas in Pinellas County moving into the Oldsmar Building.

Until early 2005, Dunedin was the home of Nielsen Media Research's production operations.

TD Ballpark and Englebert Complex are used by the Dunedin Blue Jays and spring training facilities for the Toronto Blue Jays since 1977. TD Ballpark was built on the former Grant Field c. 1930.

The downtown business district is notable for its absence of large commercial signage, corporate franchise restaurants or chain retail stores. The Pinellas Trail, a 39-mile-long (63 km) bicycle and pedestrian trail that traverses all of Pinellas County, bisects downtown Dunedin. A large portion of the trail lies on the former roadbed of the Orange Belt Railway, the first railroad in Pinellas County, which arrived in 1888.

=== Controversy ===
Dunedin has been accused of draconian fining of its residents. In one case, it sued a former resident to collect over a hundred thousand dollars for yard and swimming pool maintenance. There are cases where the city has charged tens of thousands of dollars over uncut grass or aesthetic city code violations. The city has a $250 to $500 per day accruing violation policy per city code § 22-79(d). "In 5½ years, the city has collected nearly $3.6 million in fines, sometimes tens of thousands at a time, for violating laws that prohibit grasses taller than 10 inches, recreational vehicles parked on streets at certain hours or sidings and bricks that don't match." The case was dropped about a month after it was initiated (in 2019) due to intense national scrutiny over the matter.

== Culture ==
=== Traditions ===
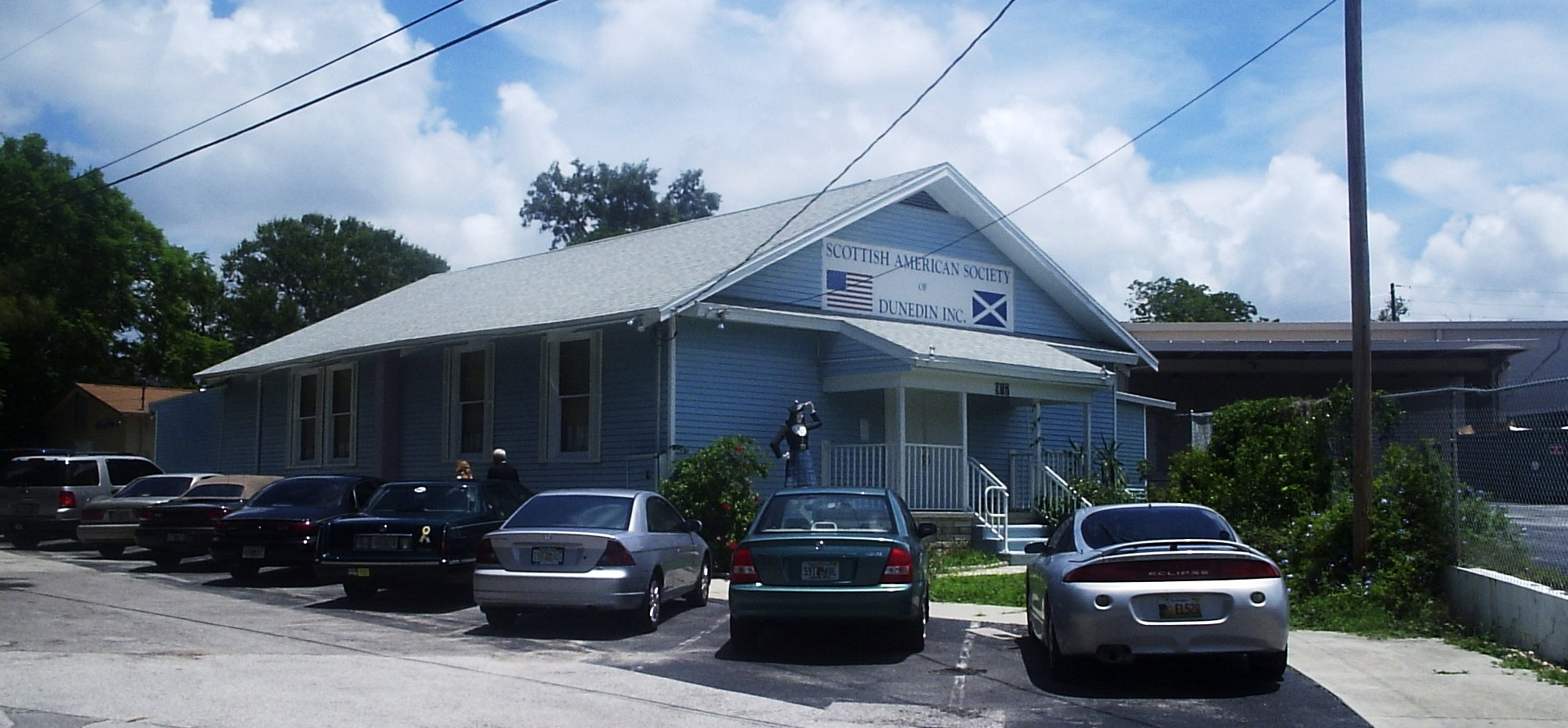
Dunedin's Scottish-American Society maintains Dunedin's Scottish heritage.

The sister city of Dunedin is Stirling, Scotland, and it has maintained and embraced its Scottish roots. Once a year, Scottish clans descend upon the city for the Dunedin Highland Games. Both Dunedin High School and Dunedin Highland Middle School have competition-level pipe and drum bands. The high school's marching band is known as the Scottish Highlander Band, and both teen and adult members make up the City of Dunedin Pipe Band.

In addition to the Highland Games, Dunedin hosts many other annual festivals. The most popular among these is Dunedin's Mardi Gras celebration, during which thousands of visitors descend on the small town.

=== City Hall ===
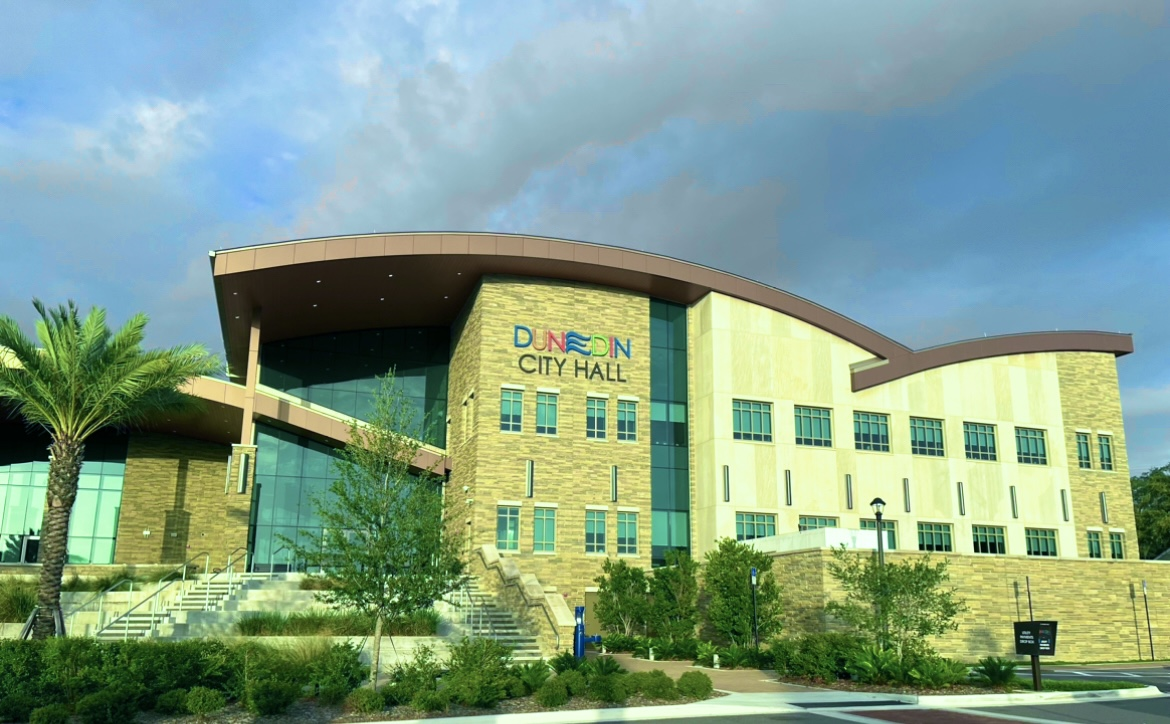
Dunedin City Hall in 2024

Located on 737 Louden Avenue, the Dunedin City Hall house the offices of the City Commission, City Manager, City Clerk, Communications, Community Development, Economic & Housing Development, Engineering, Finance, Human Resources, Information Technology, and Utility Billing. The new city hall, opened in 2023, replaced the old city hall located at 542 Main Street. The new Dunedin City Hall is designed with a concept based on a wave, suggesting Dunedin’s identity as a coastal city. This design also aligns with the city’s branding, which features a wave/nautical flag design. The building materials include natural limestone panels and manufactured ledgestone. The curtainwall across the front of the Commission Chambers reflects the "transparency of government."

=== Historic buildings ===
Located on Edgewater Drive, the Fenway Hotel is a historic hotel that has seen many famous guests throughout its lifetime.

Other historic structures in Dunedin:

- Andrews Memorial Chapel, built in 1888
- J. O. Douglas House, built in 1880
- Willis S. Blatchley House, built in 1916
- Dunedin Golf Club 11th Hole Bridge, 1926

=== Recreation ===
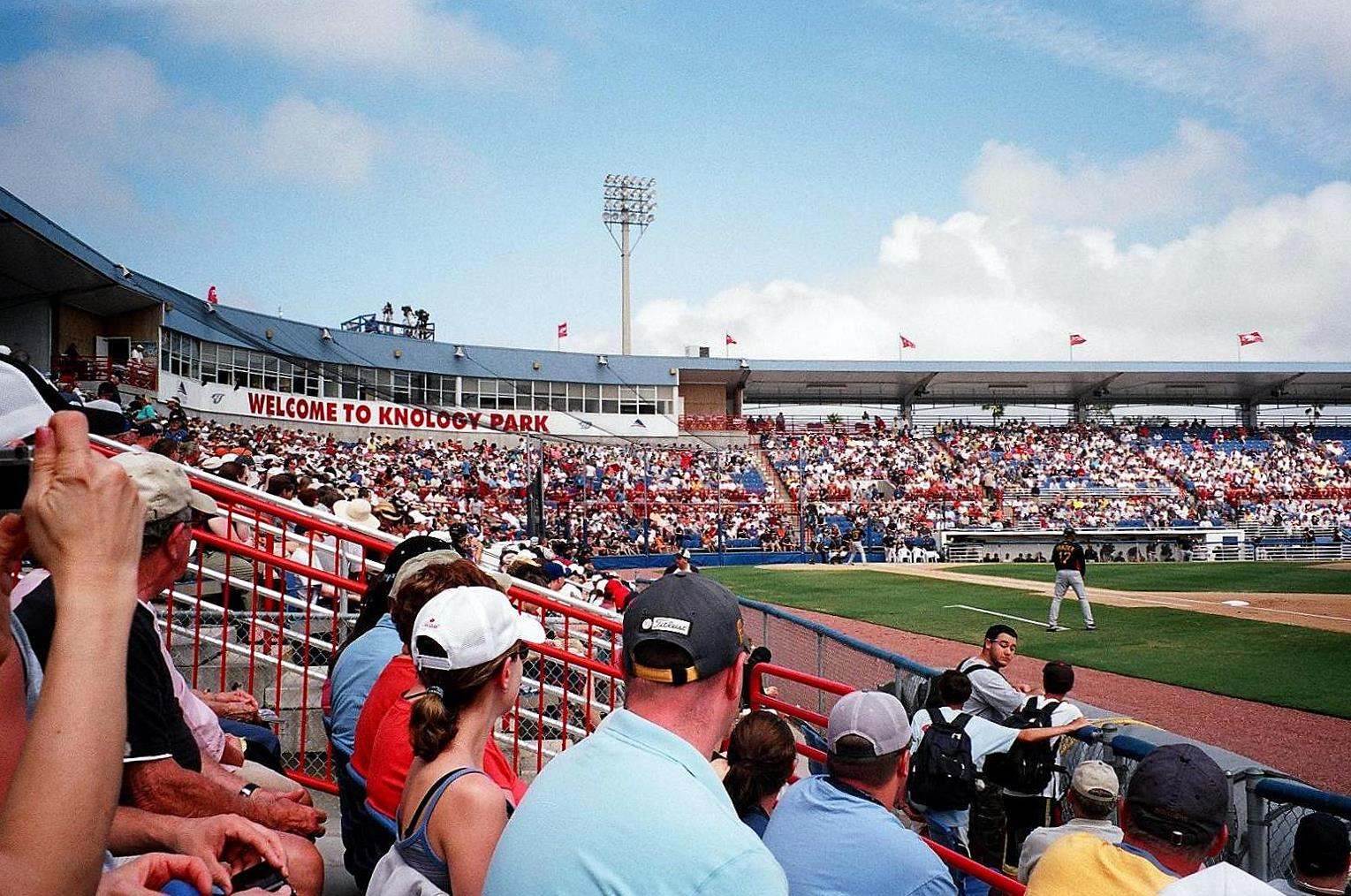
TD Ballpark is home to the Toronto Blue Jays during Spring Training.

The city of Dunedin contains a Parks & Recreation Department, which provides low-cost recreation programming to the city's residents. The city operates four recreation facilities, each one designed to provide resources for a specific age group.

In 2007, Dunedin opened its newest and largest recreation facility, the Dunedin Community Center at a cost of just over $10 million. The project was mostly paid for by the "Penny for Pinellas" tax. The St. Petersburg Times wrote that Marston "figured that since the county needs recreation programs of its own and the city needs a new community center, why not ask the county to pay for the project in exchange for access to the new facility." Marston's proposal marked a turning point for the city as it saved Dunedin taxpayers millions, and allowed Dunedin officials to replenish vital strategic reserves. The center features classrooms / multi-purpose rooms, dance and exercise rooms, fitness center, gymnasium, kids area, gaming room, library, playground, rental facility, stage.

The Dunedin Fine Art Center (DFAC), opened in 1975, has grown to be one of the most renowned centers for visual art instruction and exhibition in the southeastern United States. At nearly 40,000 sq ft (3,700 m^{2}), DFAC houses five galleries, 15 studio classrooms, the Gallery Gift Shop, the Palm Cafe and the DLM Children's ART Museum. Tampa Bay Times writer Lennie Bennett says that DFAC is "the artistic equivalent of a village square," offering quality experiences to people of all ages.

Since 1977, Dunedin has been the spring training home of the Toronto Blue Jays, as well as the class-A Dunedin Blue Jays of the Florida State League. In April and May 2021, the Toronto Blue Jays played their regulation games at TD Ballpark in Dunedin, due to COVID-19 cross-border restrictions. Dunedin is one of the smallest communities used by Major League spring training teams, although surrounded by a large metropolitan area. TD Ballpark is situated next to the Dunedin Public Library a few blocks south of downtown on Douglas Avenue, and is just two blocks east of Edgewater Drive. The stadium was built as a replacement to Grant Field, the Blue Jays' first spring training ball park. The library was founded in 1895 and is the oldest public library in Pinellas County.

Other recreation facilities includes:

- Martin Luther King Jr. Recreation Center – classrooms, game room, gymnasium, outdoor basketball courts, picnic area, playground, rental space, skate park, teen room
- Hale Seniors Activity Center – ballroom event rooms, classrooms, meeting rooms, exercise room, computer room, game room, gift shop, rental rooms
- Dunedin Nature Center
- Highlander Pool Complex/Kiwanis Spraygrounds – outdoor pool open from April to September
- Dunedin Country Club – a semi-private golf course with memberships available and the course is open to the public. The course was deeded to the city of Dunedin for recreational purposes in 1930 by the Contract Investment Company.

The city has a large athletic base, with community soccer, baseball, hockey, and softball teams. Dunedin reflected the Gaelic origins of its name by playing host to a short lived American shinty club, Dunedin Camanachd, in the mid-2000s.

In 2011, the City of Dunedin passed ordinance 2011-04 which authorized the street-legal use of golf carts across approximately 60% of the city.

City owned parks include:

- Achieva Paw Park
- Amberlea Park and Playground
- Dunedin Recreation Center and Playground
- Eagle Scout Park
- Edgewater Park and Playground - waterfront park with marinas and kayak launch area
- Elizabeth Skinner-Jackson Park and Playground - features a basketball court
- Hammock Park and Playground - located next to baseball fields used by Greater Dunedin Little League
- Happy Tails Dog Park (closed February 2019)
- Highlander Park
- Josiah Cephas Weaver Park and Playground
- Martin Luther King Jr. Recreation Center and Playground
- Scotsdale Park and Playground
- VFW Playground

Honeymoon Island State Park and Caladesi Island State Park are located in Dunedin along St. Joseph Sound on the west side.

The city-owned Dunedin Marina has 194 boat slips and is one of the finest municipal marinas on the West Coast of Florida. The marina is located on the Intracoastal Waterway between Dunedin Causeway and Clearwater Causeways. It is home to the Dunedin Boat Club, one of Florida's oldest Sailing Clubs.

=== Library ===
The front entrance of the Dunedin Public Library in Dunedin, Florida

Dunedin Public Library

General information
- Location: Dunedin, Florida, 223 Douglas Ave
- Coordinates: 28.0020°N 82.7865°W
- Opened: 1996

Website
- https://www.dunedingov.com/city-departments/library

The Dunedin Public Library has two branches, the Dunedin Main Library (located at 223 Douglas Ave) and the Friends Branch Library (located at 1920 Pinehurst Road), which opened in 2007. The library is considered the oldest library in Pinellas County. In 1895, Christopher B Bouton, a resident from Cleveland, gave the city of Dunedin 200 books for public use. Mr. Bouton's brother owned the town's meeting hall but gave ownership of it to the Dunedin Library Association to house the public library and a reading room. The building became known thereafter as Library Hall. Belle Culton Davies was named Dunedin's first librarian in 1920 after the Dunedin Woman's Club took over the running of the library. By this point, the library's collection had grown from 200 books to over 2,000.

In 1935, the City of Dunedin took over the Library when the collection grew to be 7,000 titles. As the population of Dunedin and the usage of the library grew, the facility was in need of more space. Two new libraries were built, one in 1956, on Louden Avenue and another in 1964, on Main Street. Mary Douglas, who was appointed as head librarian in 1935, retired and was replaced by Annie Elizabeth Niven in 1957. Niven would later be officially appointed as library director in 1959 as the collection continued to grow. In late 1972, Niven retired and was originally going to be replaced by Elizabeth Bradley, but was later replaced by Lucy Eddy in early 1973. After serving for a little over a year, Eddy was replaced by Sydniciel Shinn in July 1974.

In 1976, the Library leased and moved into a vacant space in the Douglas Plaza Shopping Center, which was purchased by the City of Dunedin for the Library in 1986. After Shinn’s retirement in March 1988, Julia J. Noah was appointed as the new library director after working as a library employee for 10 years. In 1989, the estate of Franklin Chase Milliken, a retired attorney, was left to the City of Dunedin to benefit the Dunedin Public Library. After years of planning, the City Commission approved funding for a 38,000 square foot building in 1994, costing approximately $3.5 million. Beginning in 1992, the library paved way to the introduction of the internet and new technologies. They began to replace old systems with new public computers and converted their library services, such as the catalog and circulation checkouts, to be available online. Noah later retired as director in July 1994, replaced by Wendy Foley in October of that year. Soon after the Library's centennial in April 1995, the collection was moved into trailers while the old building was torn down and a new one was built in the same location. The new building opened to the public on September 3, 1996.

As part of their offerings and services, the Dunedin Public Library offers monthly delivery service to homebound residents of Dunedin. Other offerings include a seed library where patrons can check out seeds for gardening, Wi-Fi hotspots available for checkout, and technology assistance. The Dunedin Public Library initiated a Little Free Library movement in Pinellas County. There are currently fifteen Little Free Libraries within Dunedin. The Literacy Council of Upper Pinellas, Inc., which promotes adult literacy in North Pinellas County, is headquartered in the Dunedin Public Library.

Dunedin Public Library is currently a part of the Pinellas Public Library Cooperative (PPLC), a coalition of all public libraries within Pinellas County, Florida.

== Infrastructure ==
Dunedin's major highway US Route 19 Alternate connects the city with the rest of Florida, while Main Street and Pinellas County Road 1 provides local connections.

The closest airport is St. Petersburg-Clearwater International Airport located southeast of Dunedin.

== Notable people ==
- Clayton Andrews, former MLB pitcher
- Nadia Azzi, classical pianist, child prodigy
- Sean Burnett, former MLB relief pitcher
- Mike "Pinball" Clemons, player and coach of the Toronto Argonauts
- Ron DeSantis, Governor of Florida
- Sylvia Earle, oceanographic explorer and marine biologist
- John G. Hanna, sailboat designer, designed the Tahiti ketch
- Jim Hendry, special assistant to the New York Yankees, former GM of the Chicago Cubs
- Gunnar Hoglund, MLB pitcher
- Doron Jensen, restaurateur and co-founder of Homestyle Buffet
- Michael D. Knox, psychologist, antiwar activist, and scholar
- George Lowe, TV actor - played Space Ghost on the series Space Ghost Coast to Coast
- David Muse, member of country/rock band Firefall and The Marshall Tucker Band
- Daniel Norris, MLB pitcher
- David Nutter, TV director for numerous series, including Game of Thrones and The X-Files
- Donnie Scott, former MLB catcher
- Frank Sprogell, professional golfer and golf course architect
- Lari White, country singer
- Mike White, head coach for the Georgia Bulldogs men's basketball team
- Henry S. Whitehead, author of weird fiction, fantasy, and horror stories
- Bobby Wilson, former MLB catcher for the Texas Rangers
- Don Zimmer, former MLB baseball player, coach and manager for five teams

== Gallery ==
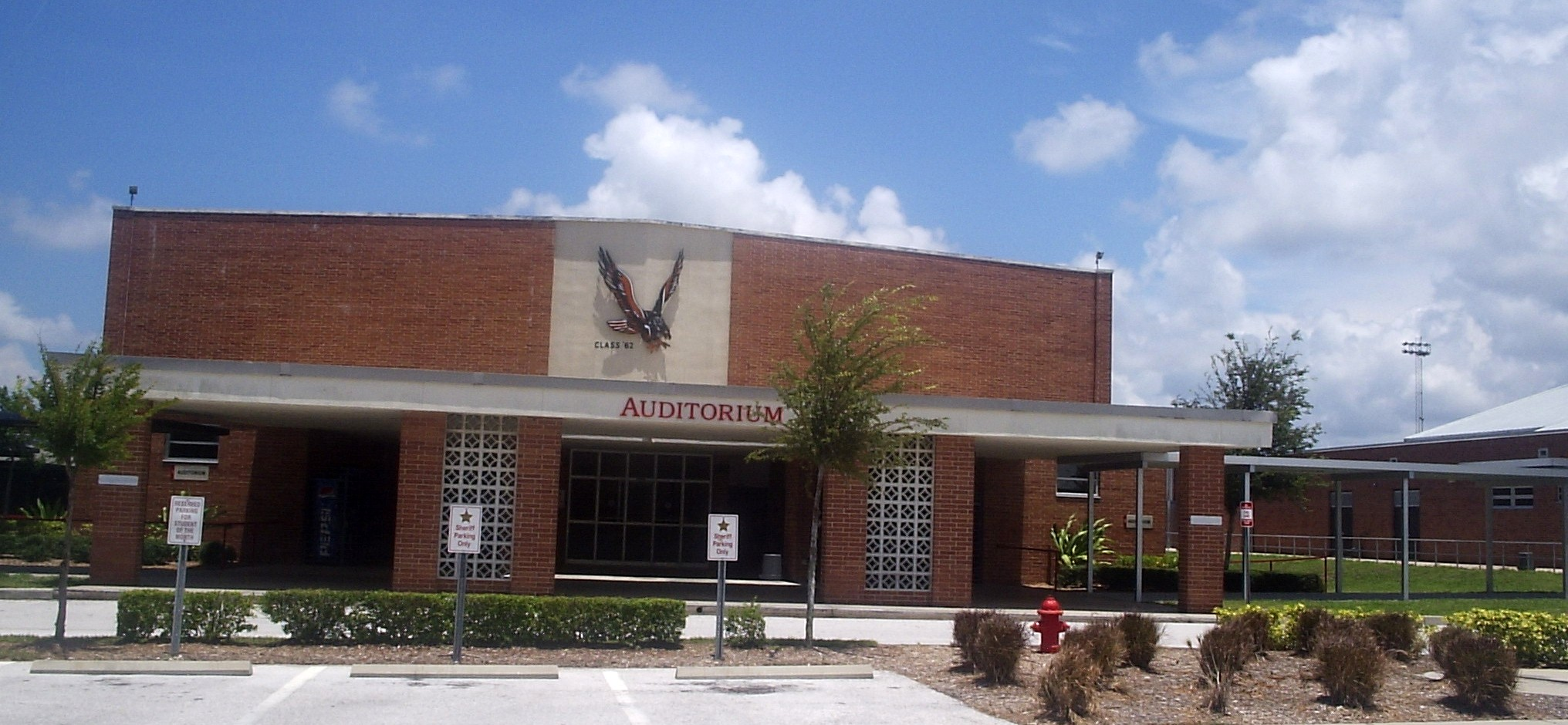
Dunedin High School

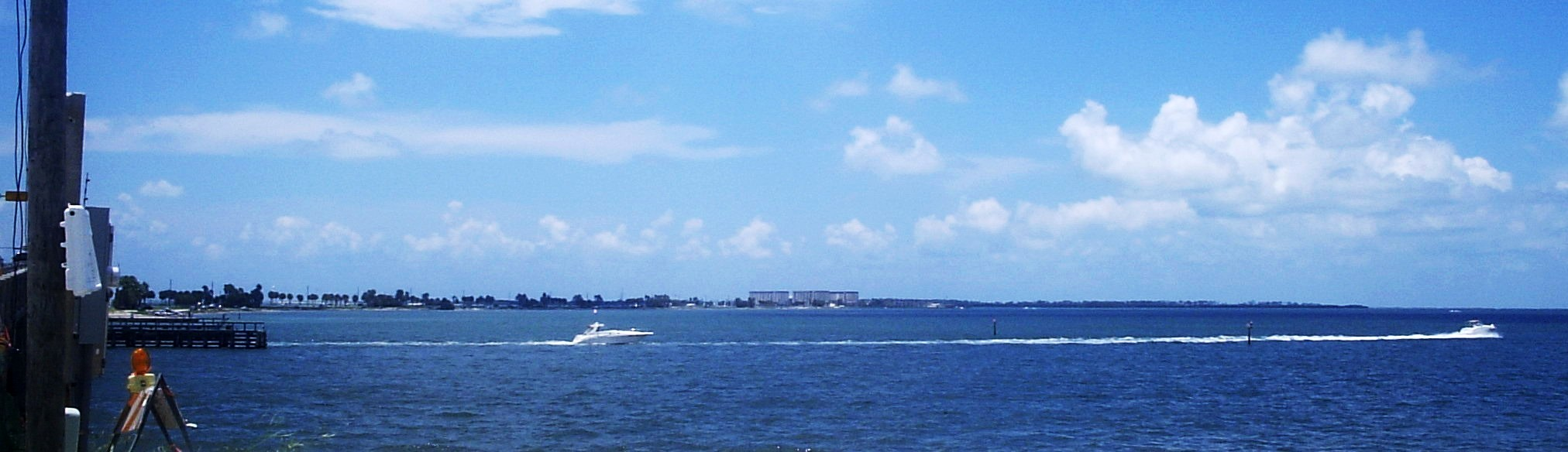
Dunedin Causeway looking west. Honeymoon Island is on the viewer's right.

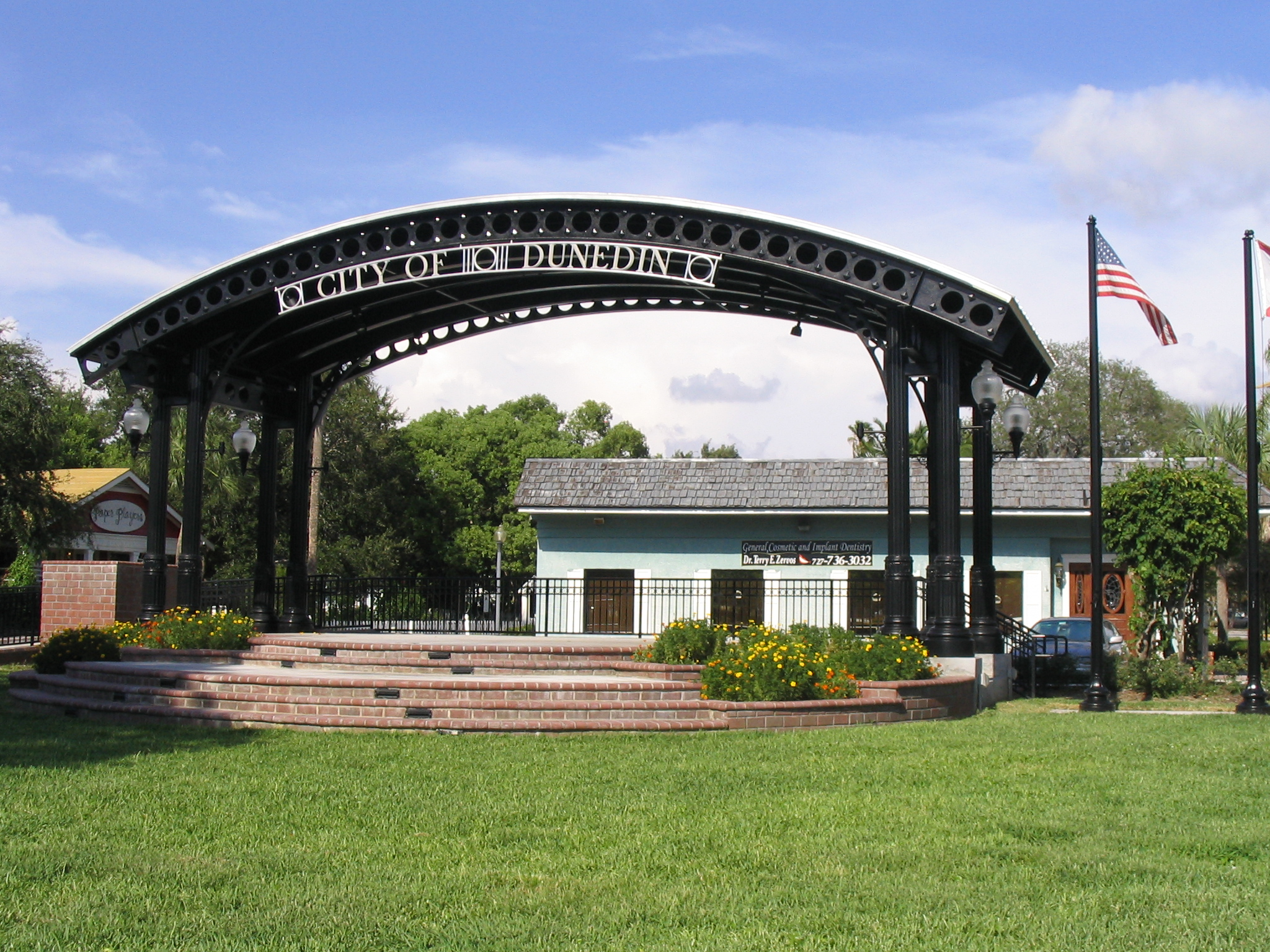
Band shell in the park in downtown Dunedin

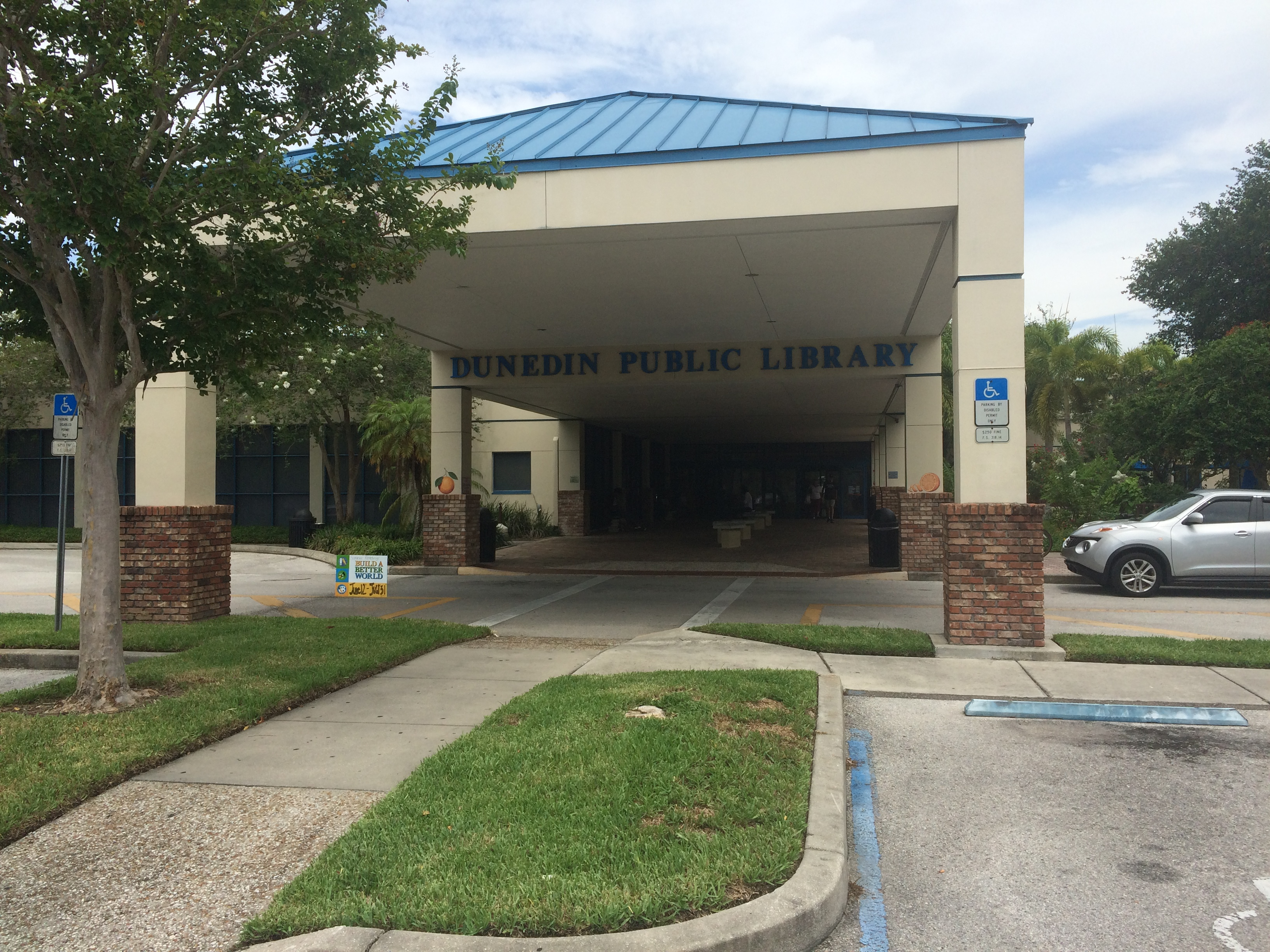
The Dunedin Public Library

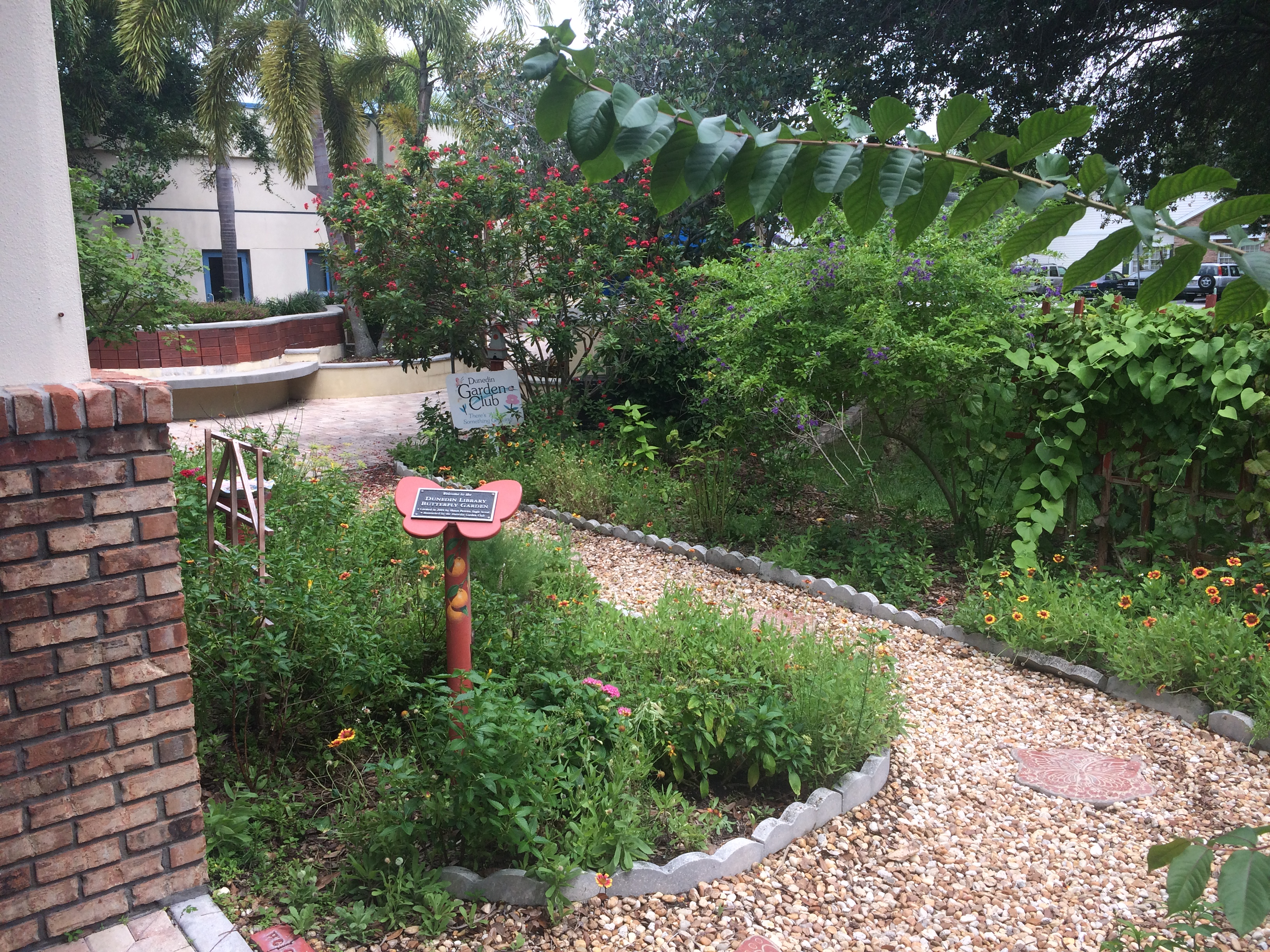
The Dunedin Garden Club Butterfly Garden at the Dunedin Public Library

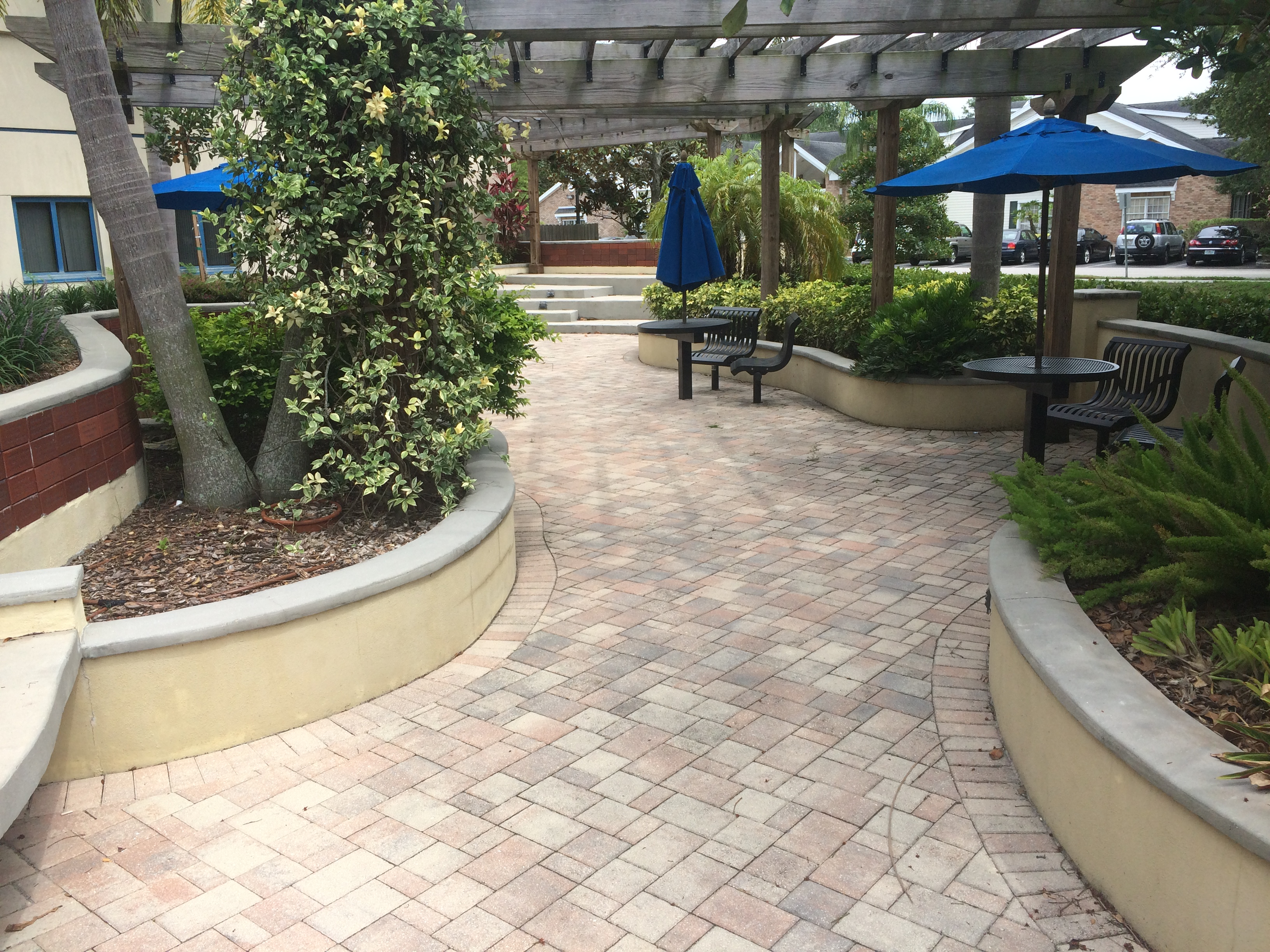
The Dunedin Public Library patio

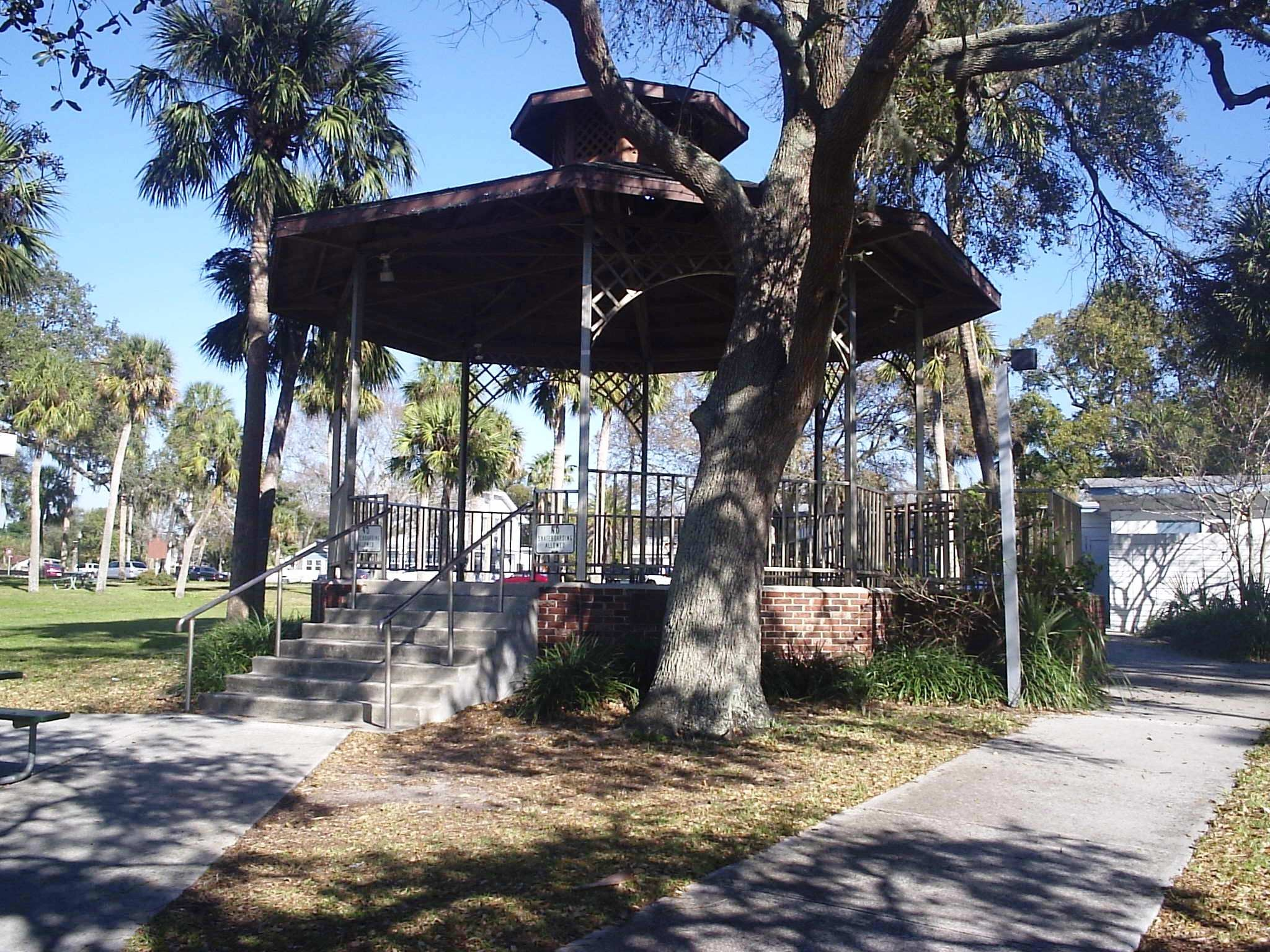
Bandstand at Edgewater Park
