= Deadly Rival Roller Derby =

Roller derby league

- Metro area: Pinellas County, FL
- Country: United States
- Founded: 2011
- Track type: Banked
- Venue: The Slayground 4033 35th St. N, St. Petersburg
- Affiliations: Roller Derby Coalition of Leagues (RDCL)
- Org. type: LLC
- Website: www.deadlyrivalrollerderby.com

Deadly Rival Roller Derby (DRRD) is Florida's only Banked Track Roller Derby league, the only Banked Track league in the Southeastern United States and the 8th operating in the country as of 2019. When the league was first organized, Deadly Rival was the original roller derby league of Pinellas County, and throughout their history maintained the largest women's roller derby league in the county. Founded in 2011 as Pinellas County Roller Girls, the league played four exhibition bouts the first year: the Roll-A-Hula Luau, the School Girl Massacre, the Rocky Roller Derby Show, and the Roller Derby Christmas Story. The league also played their first travel bout, the Breast Cancer Awareness Skate-Off, against the Lakeland Derby Dames' team, the Rockabilly Rebels.

By 2012, the league had grown to form two home teams, the Hot Rod Hotties and the Cat O' StrophiX. The home teams battled against each other for five bouts throughout the season, with such themes as Superhero Smackdown and Cirque de Slaughter, before the Cat O' StrophiX won the championship, therefore earning their logo to be placed on the DRRDy trophy. The league also played travel bouts against the Tampa Bay Derby Darlins' B team, the Bruise Crew, and the Bradentucky Bombers' B team, the Nuclear Bombshells.

The 2013 season saw even more hard-hitting roller derby action as the home teams drafted new skaters and fought hard through four bouts before the Hot Rod Hotties won the championship. The league also played travel bouts against the Sintral Florida Derby Demons and the Lakeland Derby Dames. DRRD was featured more often in the media as well, appearing on Tampa Bay's local Fox affiliate morning show "Charley's World" hosted by local celebrity Charley Belcher.

As the league grew in skill and in size for the 2014 season, the home teams were very evenly matched as the victories toggled back and forth between the Cat O' StrophiX and the Hot Rod Hotties. After four intense bouts throughout the season, the score was tied 2-2. But the October championship was won by the Hot Rod Hotties once again, earning the team the coveted golden skate trophy. The DRRD travel team took on some challenging opponents in the 2014 season, scheduling seven bouts with such teams as the Ocala Cannibals, the Miami Vice City Rollers, the North River Rolling Renegades of Sarasota, the All City Rollers in Alachua County, and what was becoming a familiar matchup, the Lakeland Derby Dames' travel team, the Rockabilly Rebels. DRRD considered this their first real travel season and finished strong with 5 wins and 2 losses.

For the 2015 season, the league decided to change up the home team structure and host exhibition bouts by creating fun, new names and themes each game. The season opener in February is a glow-in-the-dark theme, complete with black lights and glow sticks. The Mean Green Galaxy takes on the Evil Pink Eclipse for Mayhem in the Milky Way. The travel team is still going strong with upcoming bouts against the Sintral Florida Derby Demons of Daytona, the Bradentucky Bombers of Bradenton, and two eagerly awaited rematches versus the Miami Vice City Rollers.

In 2014 Deadly Rival acquired their Banked Track and in April 2015 opened their venue coined The Slayground.

== League Philanthropy ==
Since its inception, Deadly Rival Roller Derby has strived to help the community. The league has encouraged patrons of the bouts to bring items for different non-profit organizations, such as school supplies for Kids Charity of Tampa Bay, or canned dog food for Pet Pal Animal Shelter of St. Petersburg.

In addition to collecting much needed items, the league has also donated a portion of its ticket sales or halftime bingo proceeds to different charities, such as the Suncoast Seabird Sanctuary and the Suncoast Animal League, NOMAD Studio The Art Bus Project, Two Hangry Chicks, Project Linus, and My Hope Chest – Funding Reconstruction for Breast Cancer Survivors.

During the summer of 2012, the league donated funds to sponsor the Summer Movie Express program at Regal Entertainment Group Theatre. The funds went toward a 9-week program of "G" and "PG" rated movies, providing wholesome family entertainment at an "extra value" admission of only $1, with a portion of the proceeds benefiting the Will Rogers Motion Picture Pioneers Foundation.

Other charities that Deadly Rival Roller Derby has partnered with include CASA (Community Action Stops Abuse), Eckerd Raising Hope, Metropolitan Ministries, FND (Family Network on Disabilities), Big Cat Rescue, Girls, Inc., and The Exalted Warrior Foundation.
