= Tampa Bay area =

Metropolitan area in Florida, U.S.

Tampa Bay Area Tampa–St. Petersburg–Clearwater MSA West Central Florida
- Region
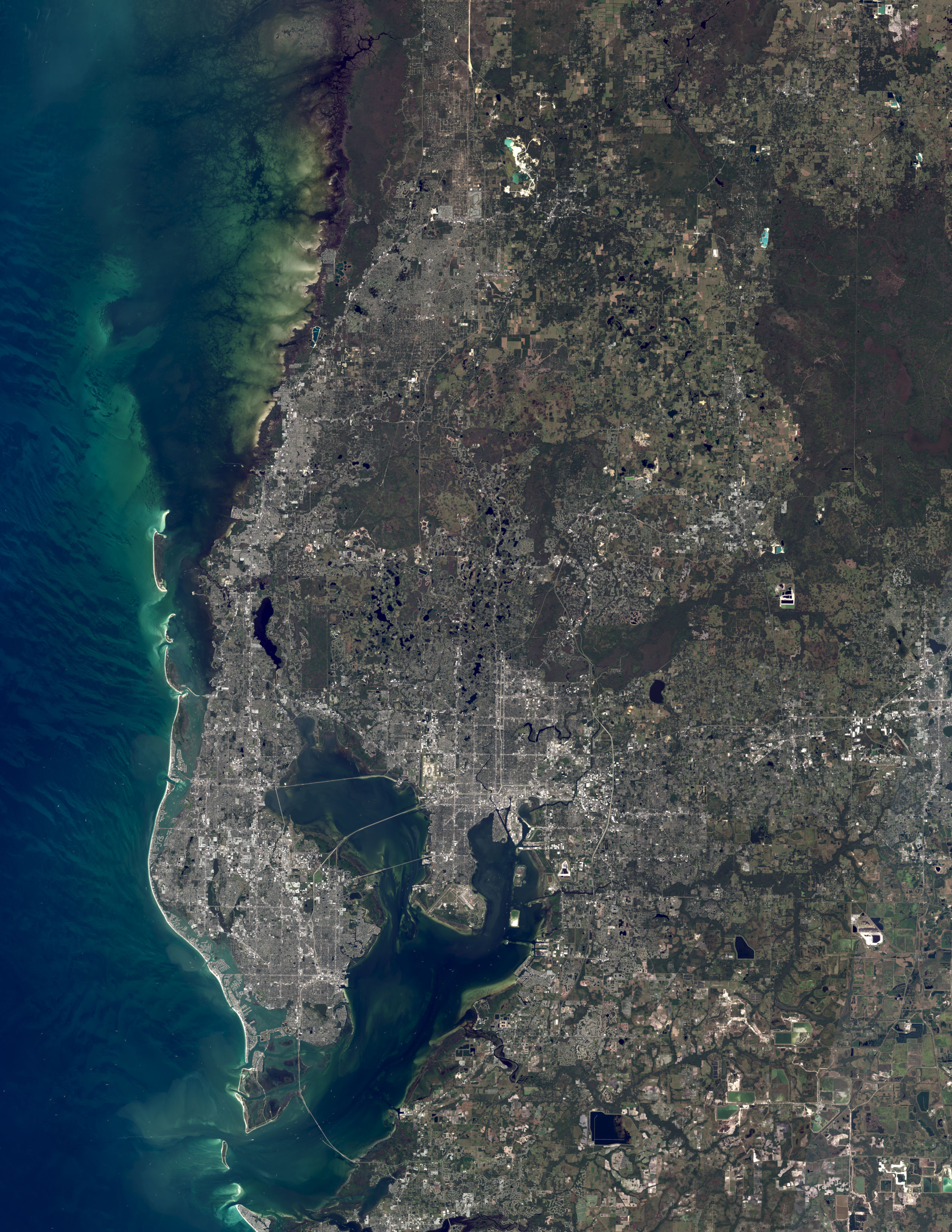
- A satellite image of the Tampa Bay area taken from NASA's Landsat 8 satellite in November 2019

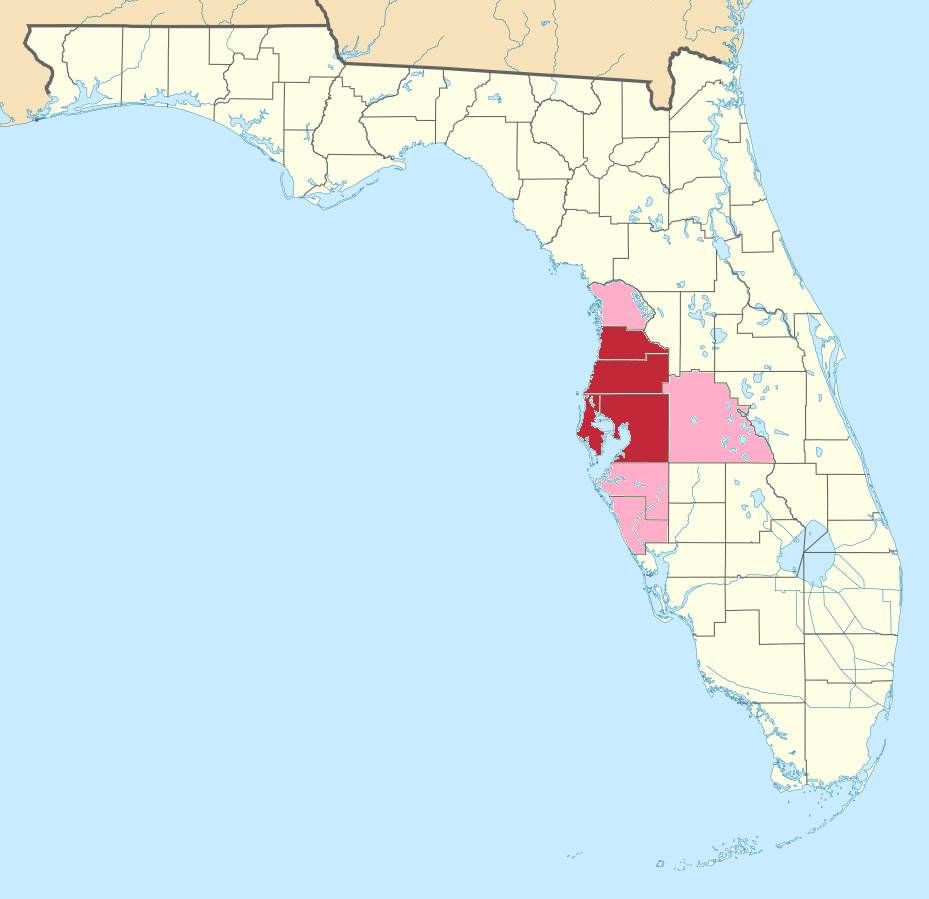
- The Tampa–St. Petersburg–Clearwater Metropolitan Statistical Area (red) and other counties which are sometimes considered to be part of the Tampa Bay Area (pink).
- Interactive map of Tampa Bay Area
- Country: United States
- State: Florida
- Largest city: Tampa
- Other major cities: St. Petersburg; Clearwater

Area
  - Total: 3,332 sq mi (8,630 km^{2})

Population (2020)
  - Total: 3,175,275
  - Estimate (2022): 3,290,730
- Ranked 17th in the US

GDP
  - Total: $243.268 billion (2023)
  - Per capita: $73,925 (2023)
- Time zone: UTC−05:00 (EST)
  - Summer (DST): UTC−04:00 (EDT)
- Area codes: 813, 656, 727, 352, 863 941

The Tampa Bay area is a major metropolitan area surrounding Tampa Bay on the Gulf Coast of Florida in the United States. Its principal urban centers are Tampa, St. Petersburg, and Clearwater, while broader definitions of the region also include Lakeland, Sarasota, and Bradenton. It is the 17th-largest metropolitan area in the United States, with a population of 3,175,275 as of the 2020 U.S. census.

The exact boundaries of the metro area can differ in different contexts. Hillsborough County and Pinellas County (including the cities of Tampa, St. Petersburg, Clearwater, and various smaller communities) make up the most limited definition. This area includes most of the Tampa Bay bayfront, aside from the far southern portion which lies in Manatee County. The U.S. Office of Management and Budget (OMB) defines the Tampa–St. Petersburg–Clearwater Metropolitan Statistical Area (MSA) as including Hillsborough and Pinellas counties as well as Hernando and Pasco counties to the north; and it is the 17th-most populous MSA in the country. The MSA was first defined in 1950 as the Tampa-St. Petersburg, Florida Standard Metropolitan Area, and included Hillsborough and Pinellas counties. Pasco County was added to the MSA in 1973. In 1983, Hernando County was added to the MSA and Clearwater was added to the MSA name. The OMB has designated Tampa, St. Petersburg, Clearwater, Largo, and Pinellas Park as the principal cities of the MSA. Unlike most large metropolitan areas, Tampa does not belong to any combined statistical area and is the largest MSA in the United States not to belong to one.

Other definitions of the Tampa Bay area include:

- The four counties in the MSA plus Citrus and Manatee counties, used by the Tampa Bay Regional Planning Council.
- The four counties in the MSA plus Citrus, Manatee and Sarasota counties, used by the Tampa Bay Area Regional Transportation Authority
- The four counties in the MSA plus Citrus, Manatee, Sarasota and Polk counties, used by the Tampa Bay Partnership and the Tampa Bay media market.

This wider area may also be known as West Central Florida as part of Central Florida.

== History ==
When the Spanish first arrived in the area of Tampa Bay, they encountered people of the Safety Harbor culture. About 20 sites with temple mounds have been found around Tampa Bay, with several in Pinellas County. Best known of the Safety Harbor people was the chiefdom of Tocobaga, which was likely located at the Safety Harbor site in Philippe Park in northern Pinellas County.

In the early European exploration dating back to 1513, the arrival of Spanish explorer Juan Ponce de León arrives in Tampa Bay. He is the earliest recorded European to step foot on eastern Florida. In 1824, the first American settlers arrived and established a military due to the growth in the area.

== Tampa–St. Petersburg–Clearwater metropolitan statistical area ==
The population of the Tampa Bay MSA is 3,175,275 people as of the 2020 United States census. The Office of Management and Budget now divides the MSA into the Tampa Metropolitan Division, consisting of Hillsborough, Pasco and Hernando counties, and the Saint Petersburg-Clearwater-Largo Metropolitan Division, consisting of Pinellas County.

Historical population
Census	Pop.	Note	%±
1900	36,013		—
1910	78,314		117.5%
1920	116,552		48.8%
1930	215,668		85.0%
1940	272,000		26.1%
1950	409,143		50.4%
1960	820,443		100.5%
1970	1,105,553		34.8%
1980	1,613,603		46.0%
1990	2,067,959		28.2%
2000	2,395,997		15.9%
2010	2,783,243		16.2%
2020	3,175,275		14.1%
2025 (est.)	3,418,895		7.7%

The following is a list of important cities and unincorporated communities, including census-designated places (CDPs), located in the Tampa–St. Petersburg–Clearwater MSA based on the 2010 U.S. census:

=== Municipalities and CDPs ===
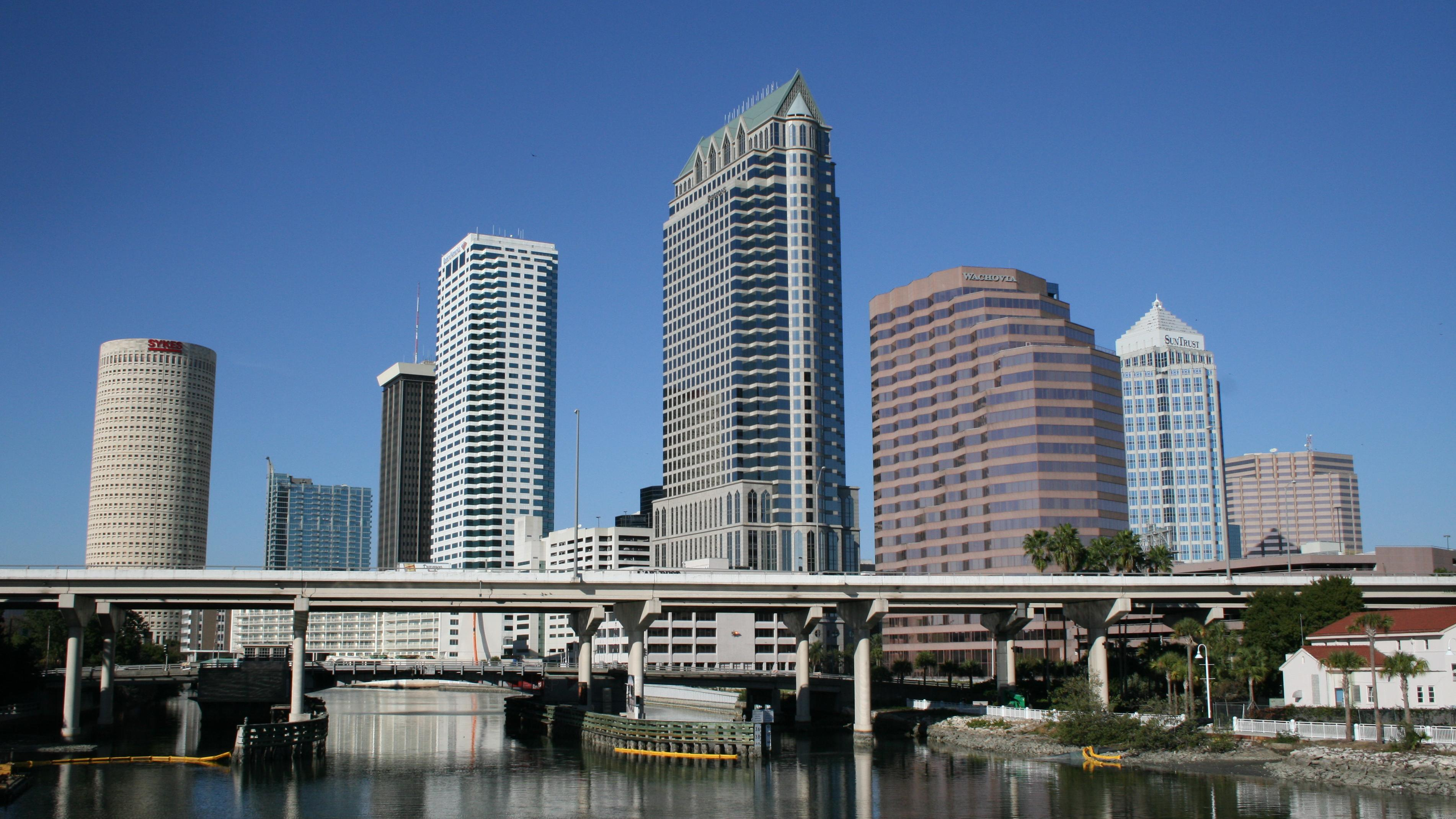
Downtown Tampa

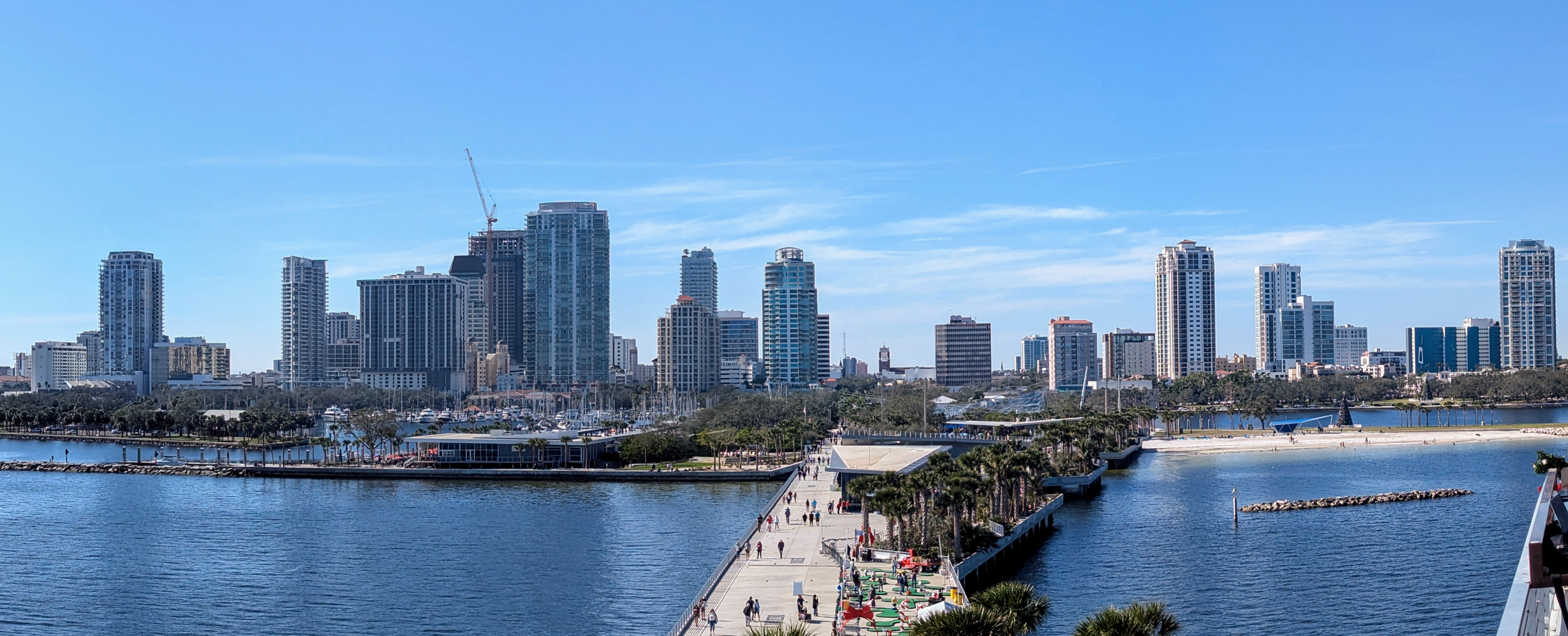
St. Petersburg

Incorporated municipalities and Census-designated places in the Tampa Bay area with more than 10,000 population.

==== More than 250,000 inhabitants ====
- Tampa
- St. Petersburg

==== More than 100,000 inhabitants ====
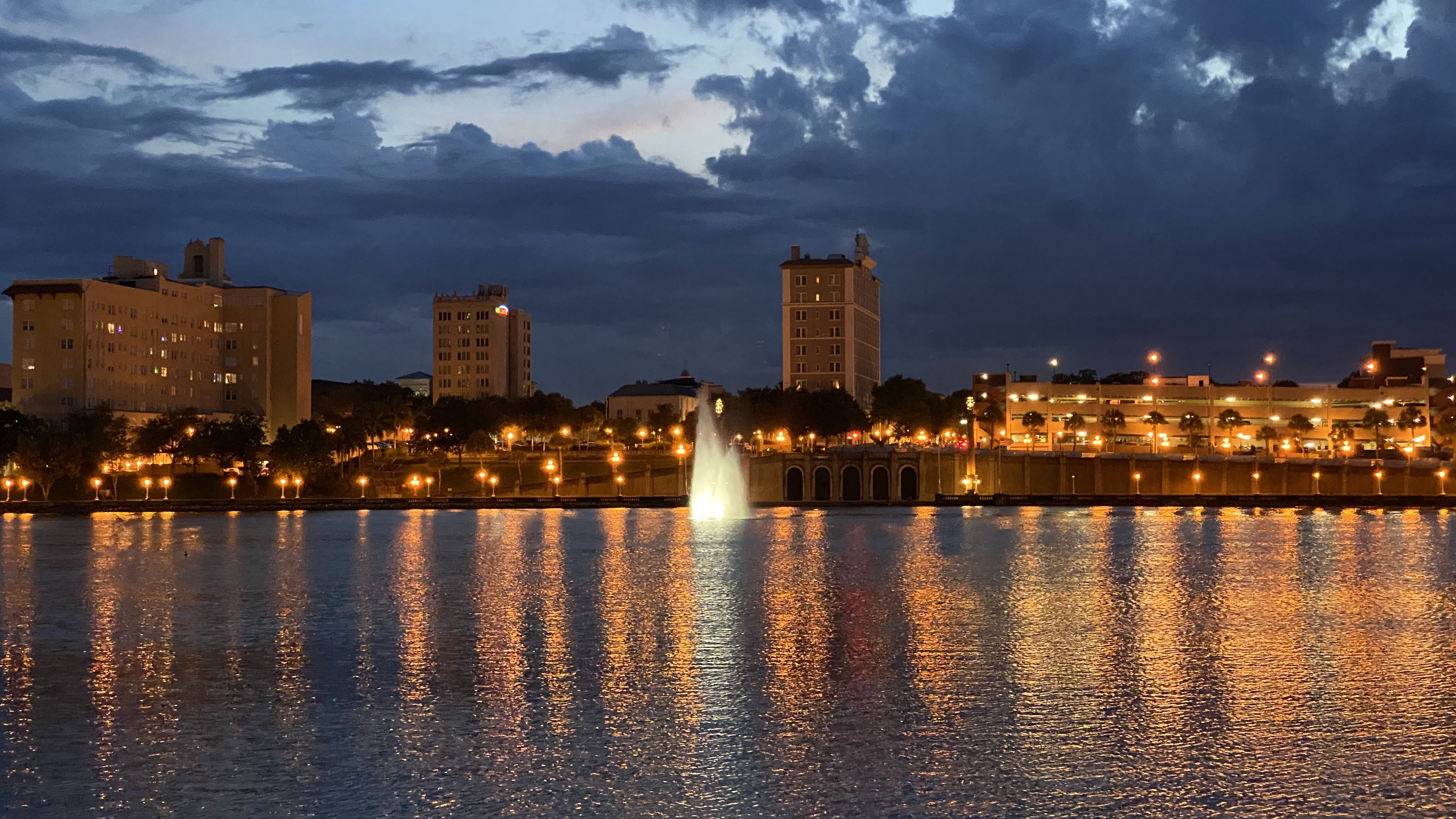
Downtown Lakeland (Lake Mirror)

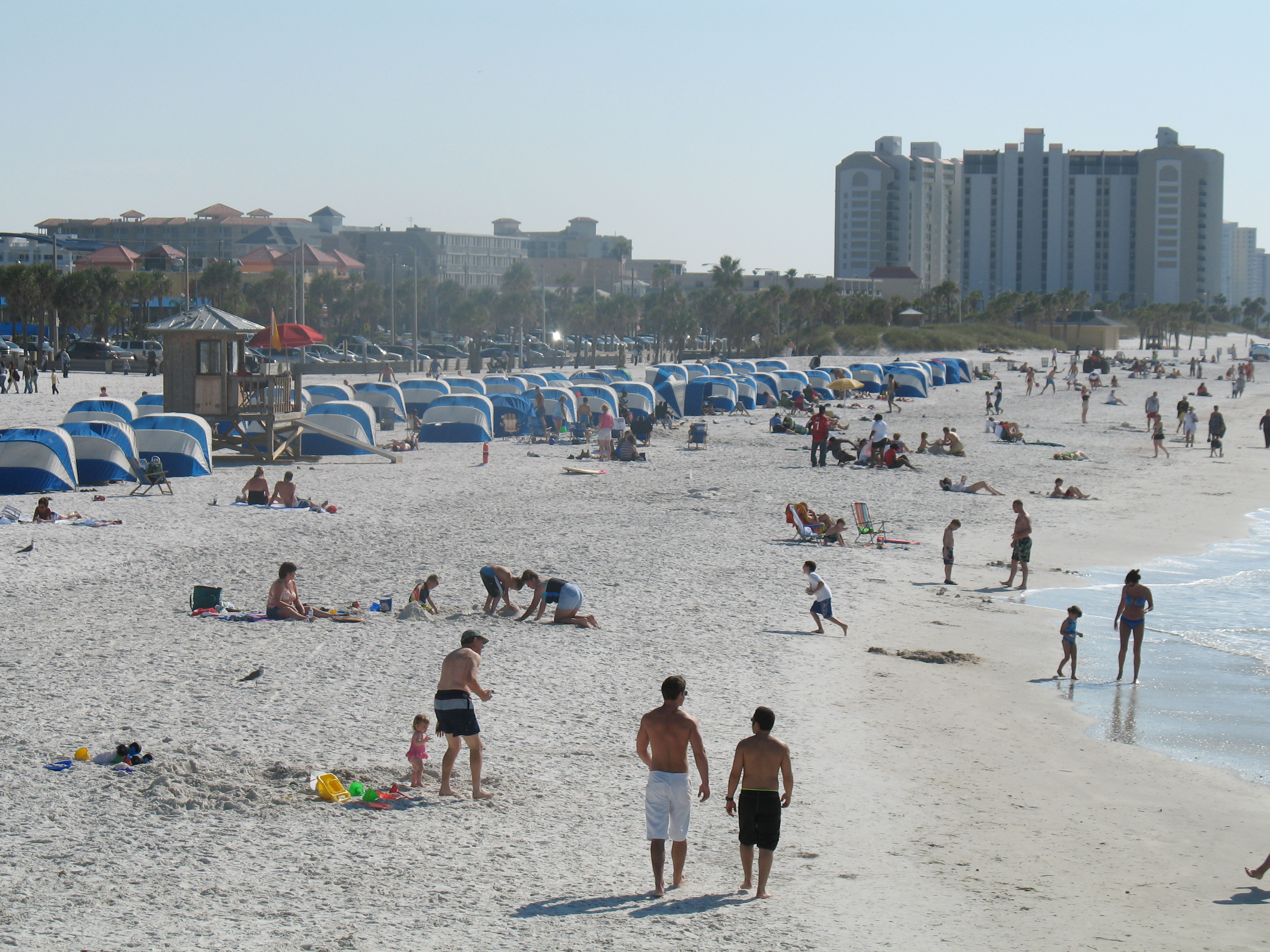
Clearwater

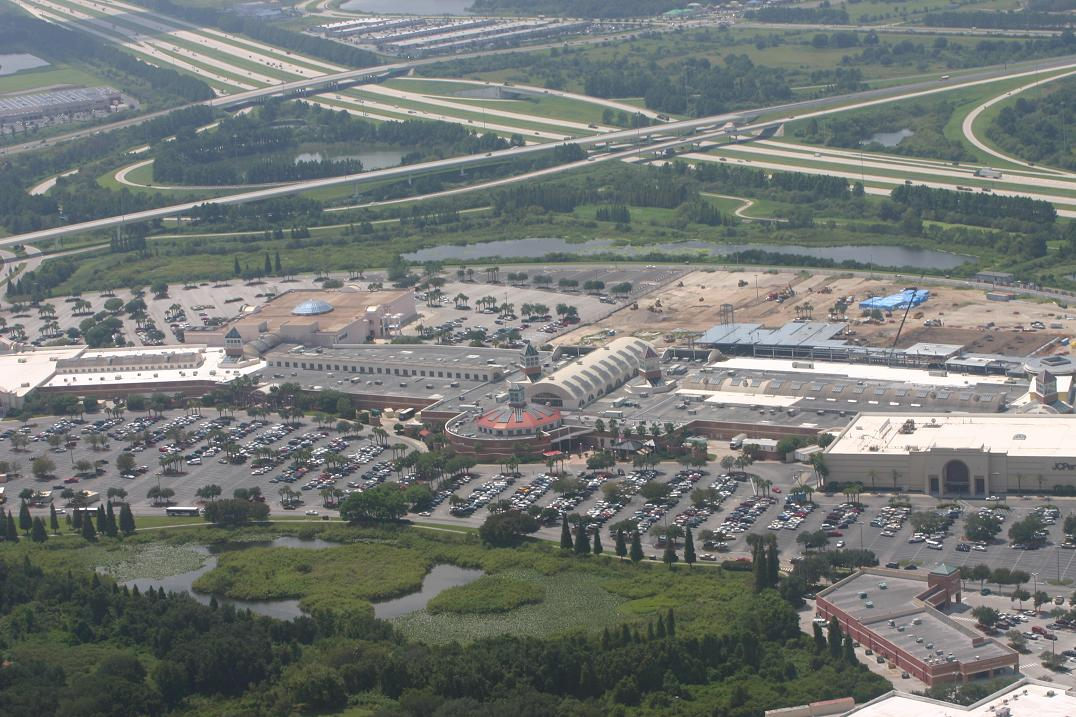
Westfield Shopping Center in Brandon

- Clearwater
- Riverview (CDP)
- Brandon (CDP)
- Spring Hill (CDP)

==== More than 10,000 inhabitants ====
Apollo Beach (CDP); Bayonet Point (CDP); Bloomingdale (CDP); Citrus Park (CDP); Cheval (CDP); Dunedin; Egypt Lake-Leto (CDP); East Lake (CDP); East Lake-Orient Park (CDP); Elfers (CDP); Fish Hawk (CDP); Greater Carrollwood (CDP); Greater Northdale (CDP); Gulfport; Holiday (CDP); Hudson (CDP); Jasmine Estates (CDP); Keystone (CDP); Lake Magdalene (CDP); Land o' Lakes (CDP); Largo; Lealman (CDP); Lutz (CDP)	New Port Richey; Mango (CDP); Oldsmar; Palm Harbor (CDP); Palm River-Clair Mel (CDP); Pinellas Park; Plant City; Ruskin (CDP); Safety Harbor; Shady Hills (CDP); Seminole; Sun City Center (CDP); Tarpon Springs; Temple Terrace; Thonotosassa (CDP); Town 'n' Country (CDP); Trinity (CDP); Valrico (CDP); Wesley Chapel (CDP); West Lealman (CDP); Westchase (CDP); Winter Haven; Zephyrhills

=== Demographics ===
Since 2020, The Tampa Bay metropolitan area has grown by more than 270,000 residents, reaching a population of over 3.4 million people, largely driven by domestic and international migration.

In 2023, the Tampa–St. Petersburg–Clearwater MSA consists of the following ethnic demographics:

Demographic	Tampa Bay	Percentage
White (Non-Hispanic/Latino)	1,930,000	59.4%
Hispanic	683,620	21.1%
Black	368,000	11.4%
Asian/Pacific Islander	134,210	4.14%

==== Age ====
Age	Tampa Bay	Percentage
0–17	852,600	22.0%
18–34	757,808	19.6%
35–54	1,066,684	27.3%
55–64	447,581	11.6%
65 and over	750,138	19.4%
Median Age	41.39 years old	

==== Race and ethnicity ====
Ethnicity	Tampa Bay	Percentage
White (non-Hispanic)	3,141,549	72.3%
Hispanic or Latino (of any race)	479,936	11.0%
Black	411,157	9.5%
Asian	77,296	1.8%
Other	149,948	3.5%
Two or more races	83,861	1.9%

===== Hispanic or Latino by origin =====
Ethnicity	Tampa Bay	Percentage
Mexican	145,685	30.4%
Puerto Rican	135,133	28.2%
Cuban	63,728	13.3%
All others	135,390	28.2%

===== Asian by origin =====
Ethnicity	Tampa Bay	Percentage
Indian	28,073	1.01%
Vietnamese	21,084	0.72%
Filipino	12,076	0.35%
All others	20,000	0.7%

== List of counties ==
County	2024 estimate	2020 Census	%±	Area	Density
Hillsborough County	1,574,115	1,459,762	+7.83%	1,020 sq mi (2,600 km^{2})	1,543/sq mi (596/km^{2})
Pinellas County	948,563	959,107	−1.10%	274 sq mi (710 km^{2})	3,462/sq mi (1,337/km^{2})
Pasco County	674,516	561,891	+20.04%	747 sq mi (1,930 km^{2})	903/sq mi (349/km^{2})
Hernando County	221,701	194,515	+13.98%	473 sq mi (1,230 km^{2})	469/sq mi (181/km^{2})
Total (MSA)	3,418,895	3,175,275	+7.67%	2,514 sq mi (6,510 km^{2})	1,360/sq mi (525/km^{2})
Citrus County	171,666	153,855	+11.58%	582 sq mi (1,510 km^{2})	295/sq mi (114/km^{2})
Manatee County	468,200	399,705	+17.14%	743 sq mi (1,920 km^{2})	630/sq mi (243/km^{2})
Polk County	874,790	725,041	+20.65%	1,798 sq mi (4,660 km^{2})	487/sq mi (188/km^{2})
Sarasota County	479,958	434,005	+10.59%	556 sq mi (1,440 km^{2})	863/sq mi (333/km^{2})
Total (MSA + other counties)	5,413,509	4,887,881	+10.75%	6,193 sq mi (16,040 km^{2})	874/sq mi (338/km^{2})

== Politics ==
The Tampa Bay metropolitan area has traditionally been considered a bellwether region in Florida. However, since Donald Trump became the Republican nominee and carried the area by three points in 2016, it has exhibited a slight Republican lean. In the 2020 election, while suburban areas across the country shifted significantly away from Trump, Tampa Bay moved only 0.4 percentage points to the left. This trend was likely influenced by gains among Hispanic voters, which offset the defection of white suburbanites. By the 2024 election, Trump won the metro area by a double-digit margin.

Tampa Bay metropolitan presidential election results
Year	Democratic	Republican	Third parties
2024	44.0% 715,788	54.4% 884,714	1.5% 24,461
2020	48.0% 810,409	50.6% 853,640	1.4% 22,951
2016	46.1% 663,534	49.1% 707,142	4.8% 68,615
2012	51.6% 660,809	48.4% 619,459'	0.0% 0

== Geography ==
The Tampa Bay area is located along Tampa Bay which it is named for. Pinellas County and St. Petersburg, Florida lies on a peninsula between Tampa Bay and the Gulf of Mexico, and much of the city of Tampa, Florida lies on a smaller peninsula jutting out into Tampa Bay.

=== Climate ===
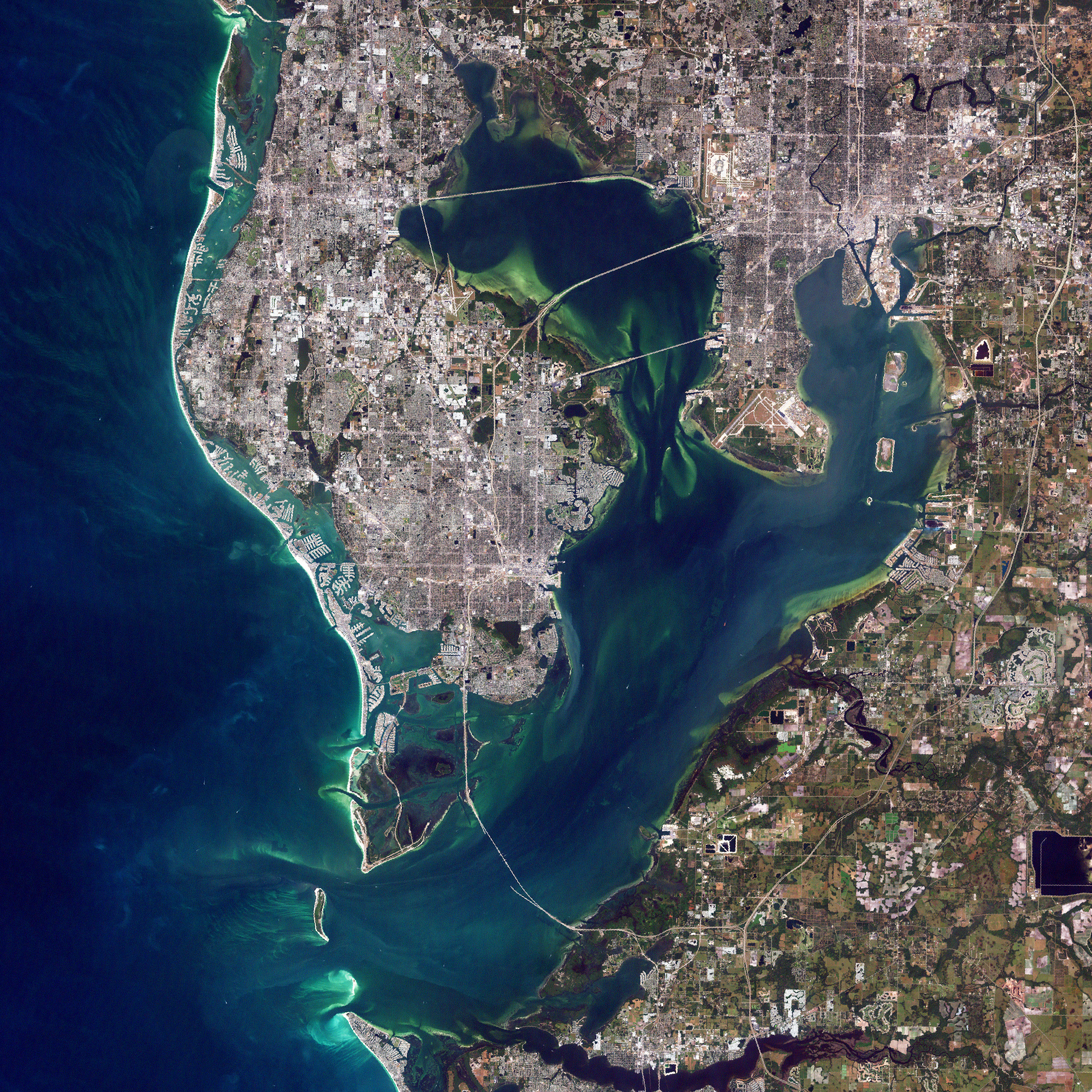
Tampa Bay Area from space

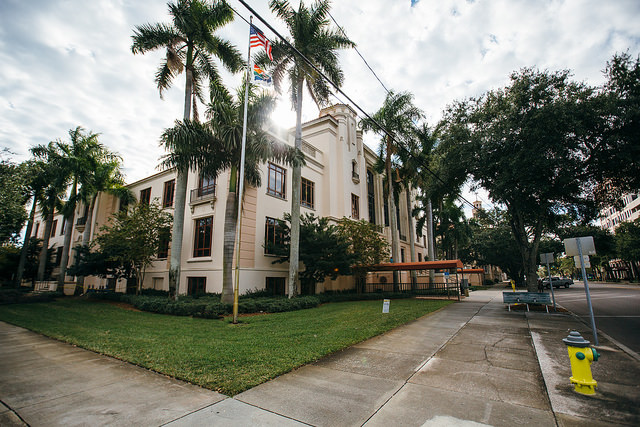
Royal palms in front of St. Petersburg's city hall

The Tampa Bay area has a humid subtropical climate (Koppen Cfa) with hot, humid summers, with daily thunderstorms, drier, predominantly sunny winters, and warm-to-hot springs with a pronounced dry season maximum. On average, two days experience frost per year in the cooler parts of the Tampa Bay area, less than annually in the coastal parts. However, hard freezes (low temperatures below 28 °F/−2 °C) are very rare, occurring only a few times in the last 75 years. The United States Department of Agriculture designates the area as being in hardiness zones 9b and 10a. Coastal parts of the Tampa Bay area closely border a tropical savanna climate (As) with many tropical microclimates due to maritime influences of the Gulf of Mexico and the 400-square-mile Tampa Bay. Plant climate-indicator species such as coconut palms and royal palms, as well as other elements of south Florida's native tropical flora, reach their northern limits of reliable culture and native range in the area. Highs usually range between 65 and 95 °F (18 and 35 °C) year-round. For the first time in recorded history, Tampa's official high reached 100 °F (38 °C) on July 27, 2025. St. Petersburg's all-time record high is also exactly 100 °F (38 °C).

Pinellas County lies on a peninsula between Tampa Bay and the Gulf of Mexico, and much of the city of Tampa lies on a smaller peninsula jutting out into Tampa Bay. This proximity to large bodies of water both moderates local temperatures and introduces large amounts of humidity into the atmosphere. In general, the communities farthest from the coast have more extreme temperature differences, both during a single day and throughout the seasons of the year.

Climate data for Tampa, Florida (Tampa Int'l), 1991−2020 normals, (Note: Mean monthly maxima and minima (i.e. the highest and lowest temperature readings during an entire month or year) calculated based on data at said location from 1991 to 2020.) extremes 1890−present (Note: Official records for Tampa were kept at downtown from April 1890 to December 1940, Peter O. Knight Airport from January 1941 to 5 June 1946, and at Tampa Int'l since 7 June 1946. For more information, see ThreadEx)
Month	Jan	Feb	Mar	Apr	May	Jun	Jul	Aug	Sep	Oct	Nov	Dec	Year
Record high °F (°C)	86 (30)	89 (32)	92 (33)	96 (36)	98 (37)	99 (37)	100 (38)	98 (37)	96 (36)	95 (35)	92 (33)	86 (30)	100 (38)
Mean maximum °F (°C)	81.8 (27.7)	82.5 (28.1)	85.4 (29.7)	89.0 (31.7)	93.4 (34.1)	95.0 (35.0)	94.8 (34.9)	94.8 (34.9)	93.8 (34.3)	91.1 (32.8)	86.4 (30.2)	82.5 (28.1)	96.2 (35.7)
Mean daily maximum °F (°C)	71.3 (21.8)	74.0 (23.3)	77.8 (25.4)	83.0 (28.3)	88.3 (31.3)	90.5 (32.5)	91.0 (32.8)	91.2 (32.9)	90.2 (32.3)	85.6 (29.8)	78.9 (26.1)	73.9 (23.3)	83.0 (28.3)
Daily mean °F (°C)	62.0 (16.7)	64.7 (18.2)	68.6 (20.3)	73.9 (23.3)	79.5 (26.4)	82.9 (28.3)	83.8 (28.8)	84.0 (28.9)	82.7 (28.2)	77.4 (25.2)	69.8 (21.0)	64.9 (18.3)	74.5 (23.6)
Mean daily minimum °F (°C)	52.8 (11.6)	55.5 (13.1)	59.3 (15.2)	64.8 (18.2)	70.6 (21.4)	75.4 (24.1)	76.6 (24.8)	76.8 (24.9)	75.3 (24.1)	69.2 (20.7)	60.7 (15.9)	55.9 (13.3)	66.1 (18.9)
Mean minimum °F (°C)	34.4 (1.3)	38.8 (3.8)	43.4 (6.3)	51.6 (10.9)	61.2 (16.2)	69.9 (21.1)	71.8 (22.1)	72.5 (22.5)	69.2 (20.7)	54.9 (12.7)	45.3 (7.4)	39.5 (4.2)	32.8 (0.4)
Record low °F (°C)	21 (−6)	22 (−6)	29 (−2)	38 (3)	49 (9)	53 (12)	63 (17)	66 (19)	54 (12)	40 (4)	23 (−5)	18 (−8)	18 (−8)
Average precipitation inches (mm)	2.65 (67)	2.62 (67)	2.52 (64)	2.55 (65)	2.60 (66)	7.37 (187)	7.75 (197)	9.03 (229)	6.09 (155)	2.34 (59)	1.40 (36)	2.56 (65)	49.48 (1,257)
Average precipitation days (≥ 0.01 in)	7.1	6.6	5.9	5.7	6.2	13.3	16.6	16.2	12.8	7.2	4.6	6.0	108.2
Average relative humidity (%)	74.9	73.0	71.8	69.0	69.8	74.4	76.6	78.4	77.6	74.2	75.0	75.0	74.1
Average dew point °F (°C)	50.2 (10.1)	50.7 (10.4)	55.6 (13.1)	59.2 (15.1)	64.9 (18.3)	70.9 (21.6)	72.7 (22.6)	73.0 (22.8)	71.2 (21.8)	64.2 (17.9)	57.7 (14.3)	52.3 (11.3)	61.9 (16.6)
Mean monthly sunshine hours	213.9	231.7	260.4	279.0	337.9	321.0	334.8	294.5	267.0	235.6	195.0	195.3	3,166.1
Mean daily sunshine hours	6.9	8.2	8.4	9.3	10.9	10.7	10.8	9.5	8.9	7.6	6.5	6.3	8.7
Mean daily daylight hours	10.6	11.2	12.0	12.9	13.5	13.9	13.7	13.1	12.3	11.5	10.8	10.4	12.2
Percentage possible sunshine	65	73	70	72	81	77	79	73	72	66	60	61	71
Average ultraviolet index	4.4	6.1	8.0	9.6	10.1	10.4	10.5	10.1	8.7	6.7	4.8	4.0	7.7
Source 1: NOAA (relative humidity, dew point and sun 1961−1990)
Source 2: UV Index Today (1995–2022) Source 3: Weather Atlas (sunshine data)

== Economy ==
Tampa Bay is ranked No. 2 among mid-sized U.S. cities for economic growth between 2019 and 2023, a trend attributed to population growth in the region. Employment levels in the area have consistently been higher than the nation's average. Average hourly wages in the Tampa area are comparable to national figures. The Tampa Metro area has seen substantial job growth, making it one of the fastest growing job markets in the state over the last five years.

As of 2025, the largest employers within the Tampa Bay area are:

Largest employers in the Tampa Bay area
Employer	Employees	Industry
Publix Super Markets	47,166	Grocery
BayCare Health System	33,631	Healthcare
State of Florida	30,664	Government
Hillsborough County School District	23,000	Education
HCA West Florida Division	21,000	Healthcare

=== CyberBay - Tampa Bay’s cybersecurity industry ===
"CyberBay" refers to the Tampa Bay Area's growing role as a national hub for cybersecurity and technology innovation. In 2026, the Florida Senate passed a resolution recognizing CyberBay as a designated cybersecurity and artificial intelligence innovation region within the Tampa Bay Area.

==== Tech innovators ====
Tampa Bay's private cybersecurity sector is broad and rapidly expanding, with numerous large enterprises, mid-sized firms, and early-stage startups. Several nationally recognized companies are headquartered in the area. ConnectWise, ReliaQuest are both have headquarters in downtown Tampa, while KnowBe4 is headquartered in Clearwater.

Tampa Bay's technology sector also includes a number of cybersecurity and secure-access startups. Abacode, Scamnetic, CyberFox, ConnectSecure, and Timus Networks all have headquarters in Tampa Bay.

==== Academic institutions ====
Academic institutions in the Tampa Bay area play a significant role in developing the region's cybersecurity workforce and supporting national cyber defense efforts. The University of South Florida, Saint Leo University and The University of Tampa have each been designated by the National Security Agency (NSA) and the Department of Homeland Security (DHS) as National Centers of Academic Excellence in Cyber Defense (CAE-CD). This designation is awarded to U.S. colleges and universities that meet rigorous standards for cybersecurity education, including curriculum development, competency development, and the integration of cybersecurity across academic disciplines.

The University of South Florida (USF), is a member of the Association of American Universities (AAU), which represents the elite research institutions in the United States including Stanford, Harvard and MIT. USF serves as a central hub for cyber education and workforce readiness in the region through its Bellini College of Artificial Intelligence, Cybersecurity, and Computing. The Security Operations Center Apprentice Program (SOCAP) gives students hands-on experience delivering services to Florida's municipalities.

==== Military and defense ====
The CyberBay region is home to United States Coast Guard Air Station Clearwater, and MacDill Air Force Base. Located in Tampa, MacDill Air Force Base is home to two major U.S. military commands: U.S. Central Command (USCENTCOM) and U.S. Special Operations Command (USSOCOM), contributing to the region's strategic importance as a defense and cybersecurity hub.

Tampa Bay is also home to a large veteran population, estimated at more than 80,000 individuals, many of whom are employed across the region's defense, information technology, and cybersecurity sectors.

MacDill AFB is home to the 6th Air Mobility Wing (6 AMW) of the Air Mobility Command (AMC) and the 927th Air Refueling Wing (927 ARW) of the Air Force Reserve Command (AFRC). Both wings share flight operations of a fleet of KC-135R Stratotanker aircraft and the 6 AMW also operates a fleet of C-37A Gulfstream V aircraft. CGAS Clearwater is located at the St. Petersburg–Clearwater International Airport. It is the largest air station in the United States Coast Guard, operating HC-130H Hercules aircraft and MH-60T Jayhawk helicopters with principal missions focused on search and rescue, counternarcotics interdiction, and homeland security. The HC-130 aircraft are slated to be replaced by new HC-27J Spartan aircraft beginning in 2017. Coast Guard Station St. Petersburg is located on the site of the former Coast Guard Air Station St. Petersburg at Albert Whitted Airport. It is home to Coast Guard Sector St. Petersburg and is homeport for the USCGC Resolute (WMEC 620), USCGC Venturous (WMEC 625), and numerous smaller cutters and patrol boats.

The University of South Florida's Center for Ocean Technology, which has been a leader in microelectromechanical systems research and development and has been using the technology to collect biological and chemical data to monitor water quality, provided underwater technology for port security at the 2004 Republican National Convention. USF's Center for Robot-Assisted Search and Rescue used its miniature robots to assist rescue teams at Ground Zero following the September 11 terrorist attacks.

==== Government agencies ====
At the federal level, the Cybersecurity and Infrastructure Security Agency (CISA) partners with organizations throughout the Tampa Bay area to advance national cyber initiatives through grant programs and technical assistance.

At the state level, the Florida Center for Cybersecurity (also known as Cyber Florida), headquartered at the University of South Florida, serves as the state's central hub for cybersecurity education, research and policy.

=== Finance and insurance ===
Nearly one in four of the state's business and information services firms resides in Tampa Bay. These firms range from financial services firms to information technology providers to professional services organizations such as law firms, accounting firms, engineering firms, consulting and more. As a gateway to the Florida High Tech Corridor, Tampa Bay is home to many information technology firms along with many business services providers.

Financial services firms:

- Bank of America
- Capital One
- JPMorgan Chase
- Citigroup
- Wells Fargo
- Depository Trust & Clearing Corporation
- Raymond James Financial
- Franklin Templeton
- MetLife
- USAA
- Progressive Insurance
- Transamerica
- State Farm
- New York Life

=== Healthcare ===
Tampa Bay is served by several major healthcare systems including Tampa General Hospital, BayCare Health System, HCA Florida Healthcare and AdventHealth. These systems operate hospitals and outpatient facilities across the region, making Healthcare one of the largest economic sectors in the area.

=== Housing ===
The area's construction-based boom was brought to a sudden halt by the 2008 financial crisis, and by 2009 it was ranked as the fourth worst performing housing market in the United States.

Changes in house prices for the area are publicly tracked on a regular basis using the Case–Shiller index; the statistic is published by Standard & Poor's and is also a component of S&P's 20-city composite index of the value of the U.S. residential real estate market. Tampa Bay residents have experienced rising rental rates and housing shortages over the past few years. In 2025, the Tampa mayor partnered with Related Urban to build affordable units in East Tampa in order to attempt to combat the issue.

== Education ==
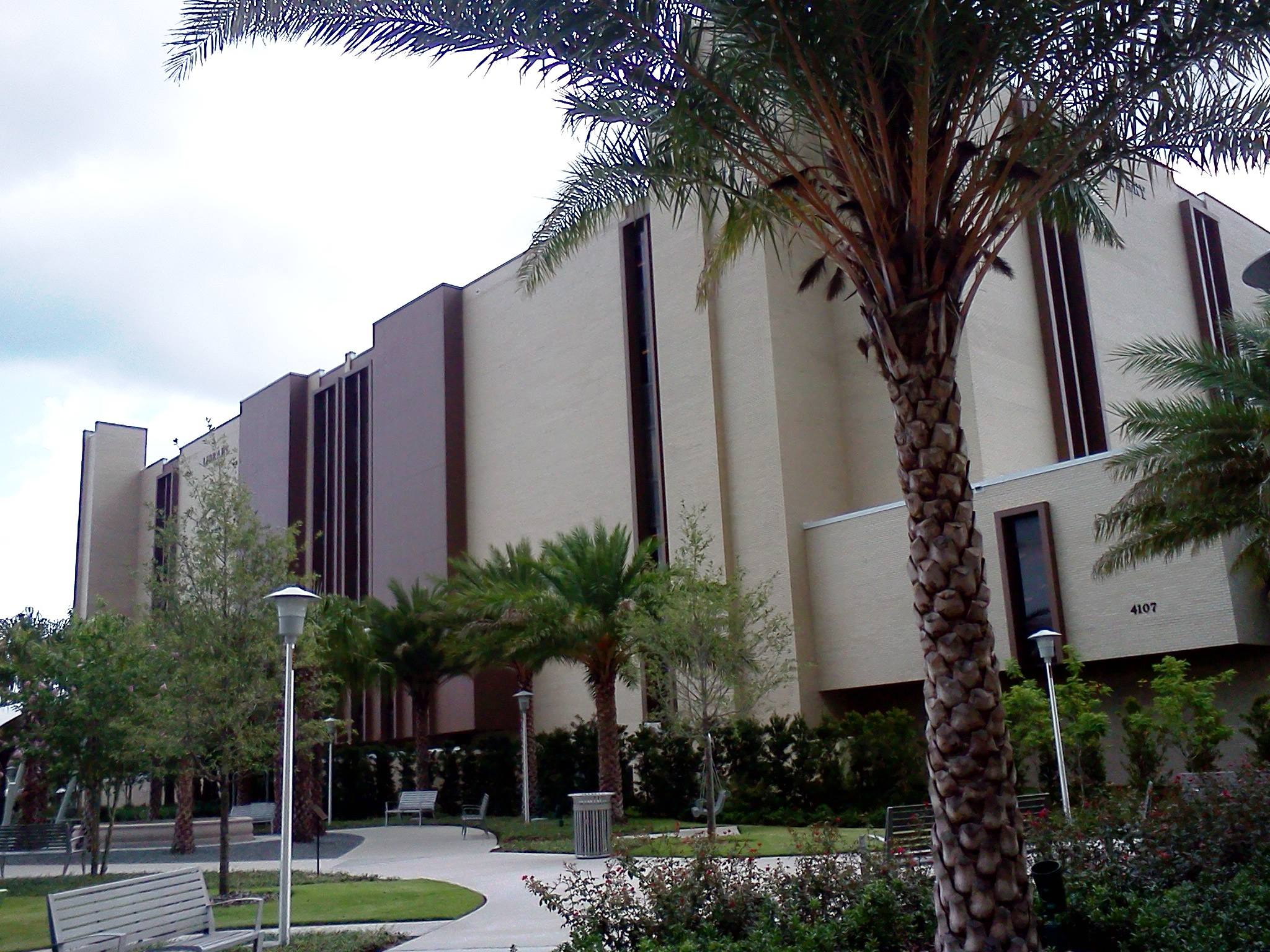
USF Tampa main library

Primary and secondary education is provided by the school districts of the individual counties making up the region.

The area is home to several institutions of higher learning, including the main campus of the University of South Florida in Tampa and its satellite campuses in St. Petersburg and Sarasota. Eckerd College in St. Petersburg, the University of Tampa, Florida College in Temple Terrace, Trinity College in New Port Richey, Florida Southern College in Lakeland, and New College of Florida in Sarasota are all four-year institutions located in the area. Embry–Riddle Aeronautical University and Troy University also maintain satellite education centers at MacDill AFB. Nova Southeastern University also has a regional campus in Clearwater. Ultimate Medical Academy provides on-campus instruction in Clearwater to students pursuing careers in the allied healthcare professions, as well as online instruction across the country.

There are two law schools in the area, Stetson University College of Law and Thomas M. Cooley Law School. Stetson University has campuses in Gulfport and Tampa, while Thomas M. Cooley Law school is located in Riverview.

Hillsborough College, St. Petersburg College, Polk State College, Pasco-Hernando State College, and State College of Florida all provide community college to the area.

== Culture ==
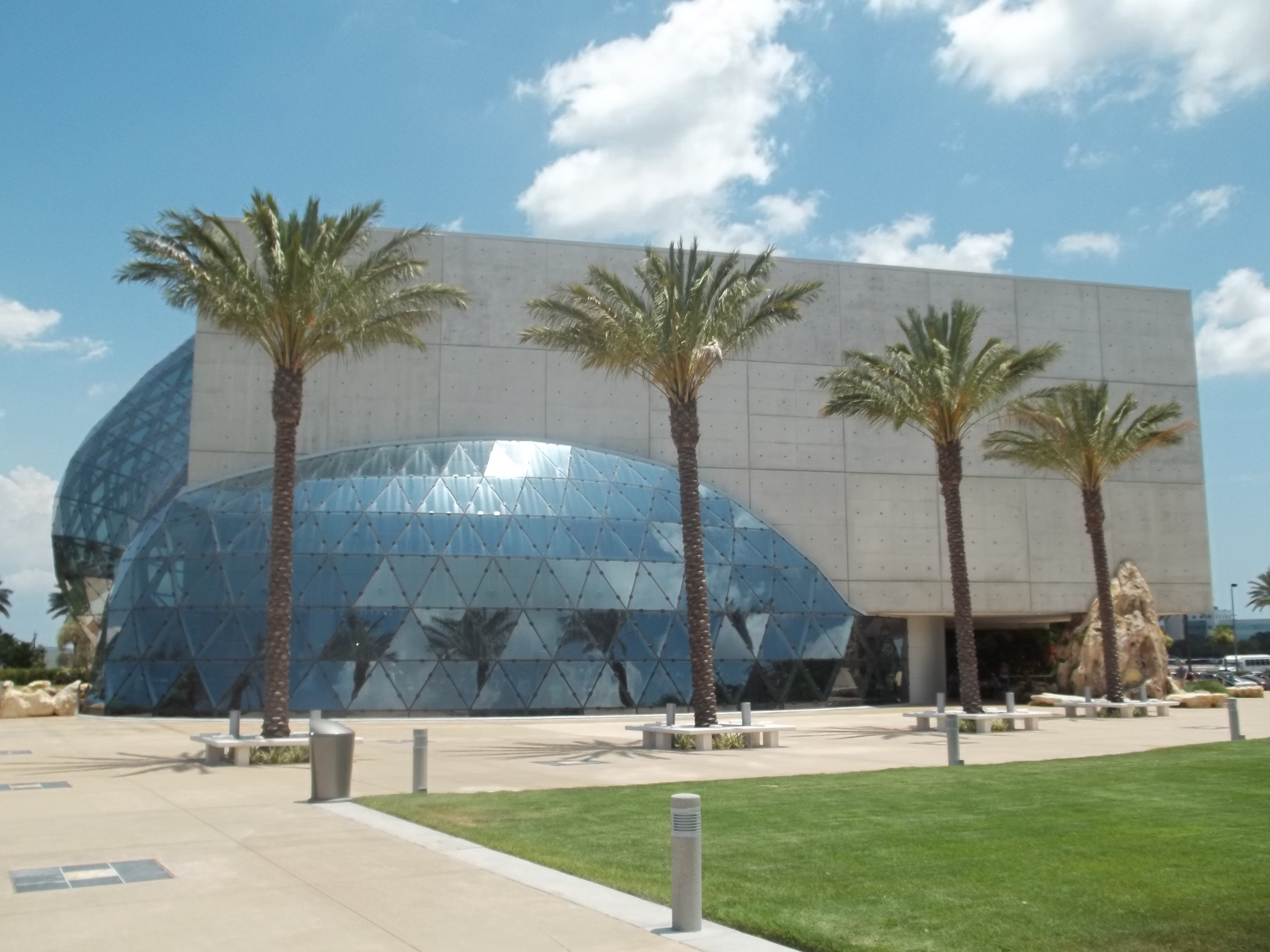
Salvador Dalí Museum

The Tampa Bay area is home to several art museums. Long established communities, particularly those near the bay such as Cuban influenced Ybor City, Old Northeast in St. Petersburg, and Palma Ceia and Hyde Park in Tampa contain historic architecture.

Fresh seafood and locally grown produce are available in the region's restaurants and farmers' markets. Yuengling, the largest American-owned brewer, operates a brewery in Tampa, as does craft brewer Cigar City Brewing. The area is also known for its influence on heavy metal music, specifically death metal. Within both the Florida death metal scene and broader genre Tampa Bay became known as the "capital of death metal".

In a single year, the economic impact of the cultural institutions in the Tampa Bay area was $521.3 million, according to a PricewaterhouseCoopers study. In 2004, 5.6 million people attended plays, musical performances, museum exhibits, and other cultural institutions in Tampa Bay, supporting 7,800 jobs.

=== Museums ===
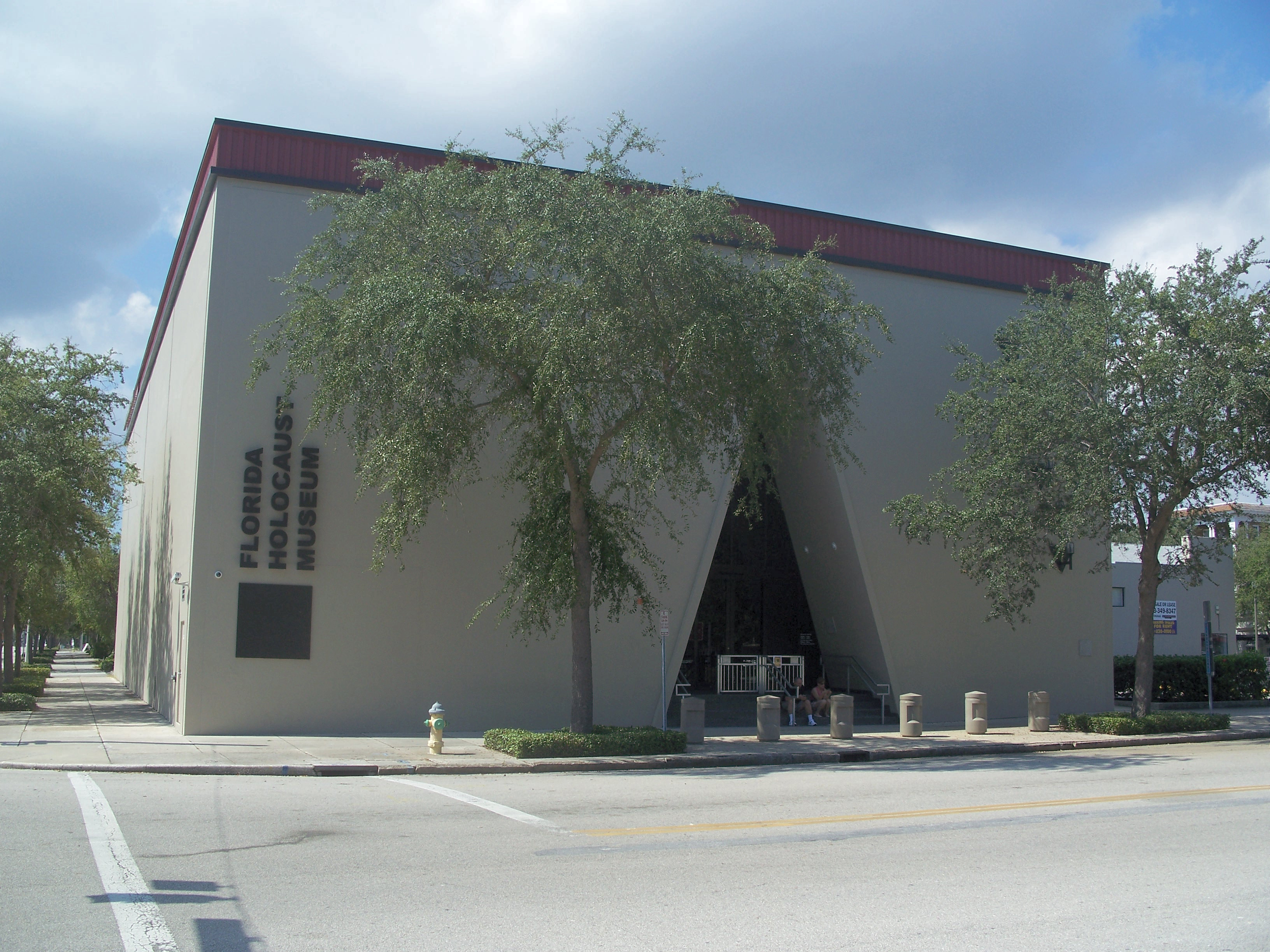
Florida Holocaust Museum in St. Petersburg

- Museum of Fine Arts near the Pier in downtown St. Petersburg
- Salvador Dalí Museum in downtown St. Petersburg
- Florida International Museum at St. Petersburg College in downtown St. Petersburg
- Florida Holocaust Museum in downtown St. Petersburg
- Tampa Museum of Art in downtown Tampa
- USF Contemporary Art Museum on the USF Tampa campus
- Florida Museum of Photographic Arts in downtown Tampa
- Museum of Science and Industry adjacent to USF's Tampa campus
- Tampa Bay Automobile Museum in Pinellas Park
- Leepa-Rattner Museum of Art on the Tarpon Springs Campus of St. Petersburg College
- The Royal Theater & Manhattan Casino Historic Landmarks in St. Petersburg
- The Carter J. Woodson African-American Museum St. Petersburg
- Tampa Bay History Center
- Ybor City Museum State Park in Ybor City
- Ringling Art Museum in Sarasota

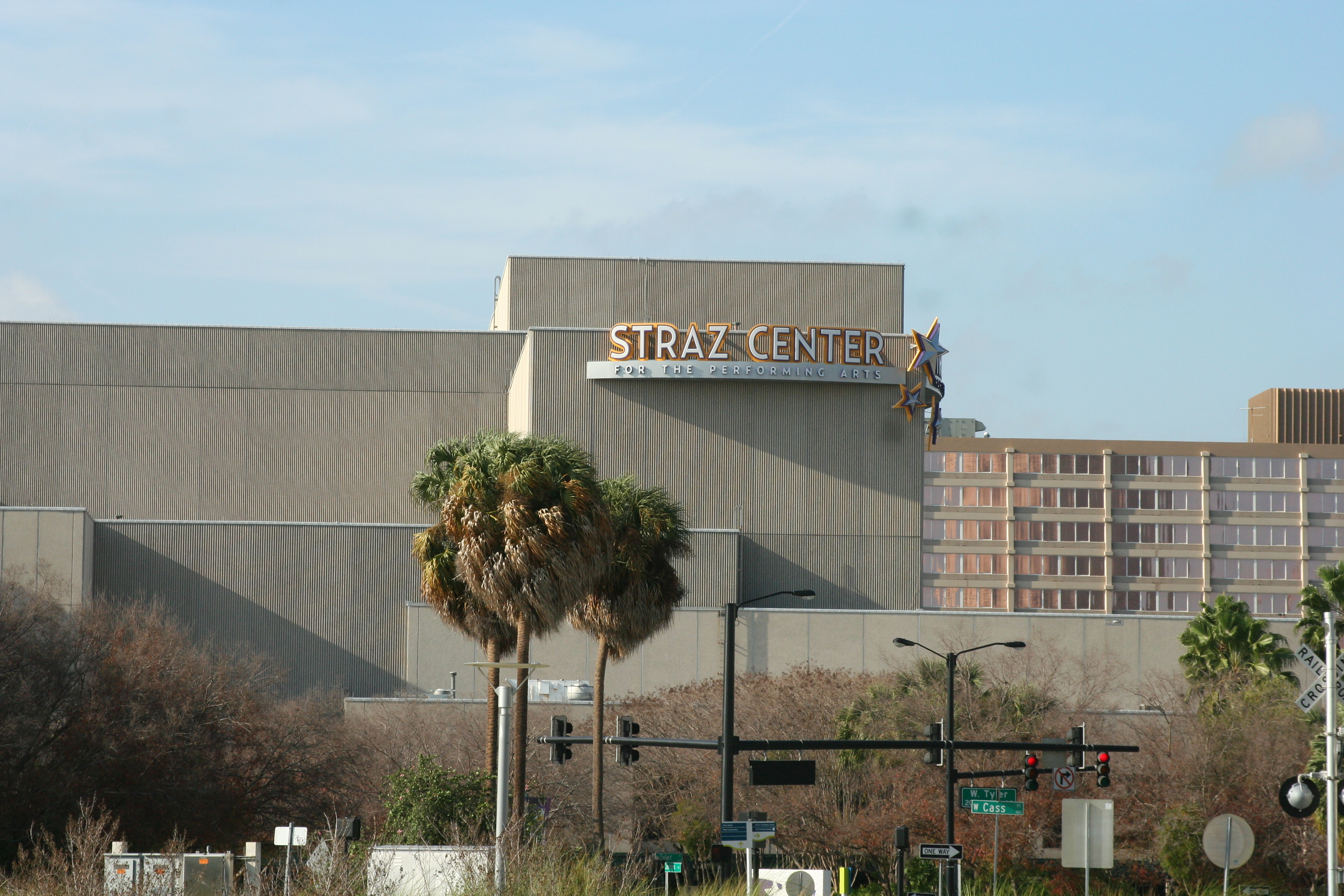
Straz Center for the Performing Arts in Tampa

=== Performing arts halls ===
- Straz Center for the Performing Arts in Tampa
- Ruth Eckerd Hall in Clearwater
- Mahaffey Theater in St. Petersburg
- Tarpon Springs Performing Arts Center
- Van Wezel Performing Arts Hall in Sarasota

=== Cultural events ===
- Gasparilla Pirate Festival held every January in Tampa
- Florida State Fair held every February in Tampa
- Florida Strawberry Festival held every March in Plant City
- Clearwater Jazz Holiday held every October in Coachman Park in downtown Clearwater; in its 32nd year
- Guavaween, a Latin-flavored Halloween celebration held every October in the Ybor City section of Tampa
- Festa Italiana, annual festival of Italian heritage held every April in Ybor City, Tampa's Latin Quarter

== Recreation ==
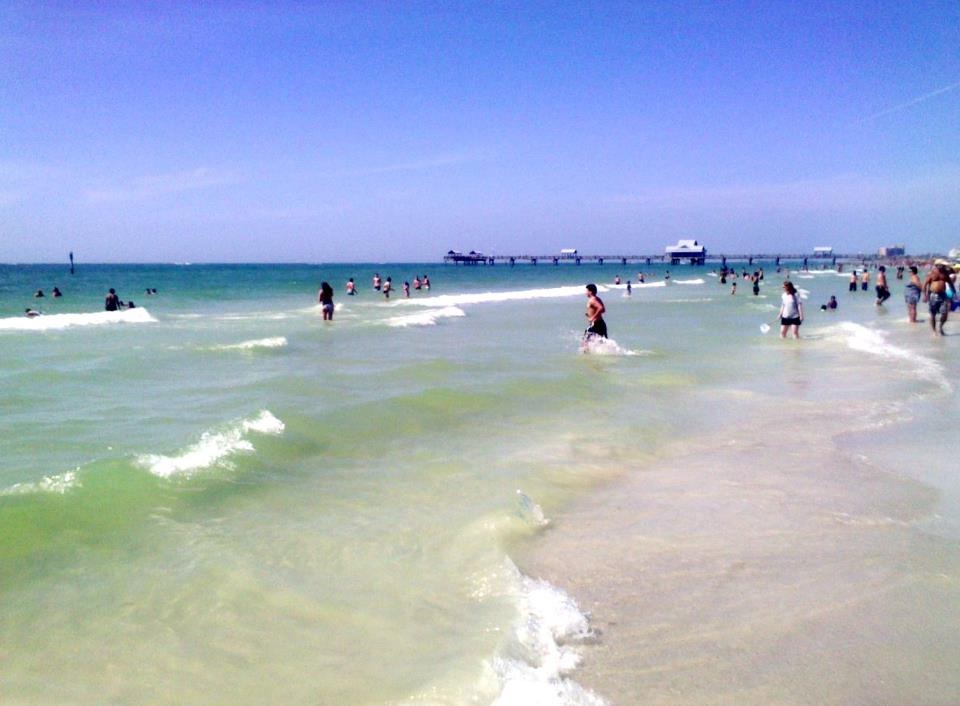
Clearwater Beach at Pier 60

The Tampa Bay area is noted for its beaches, with the warm, blue gulf waters and nearly 70 miles of barrier islands from North Pinellas south to Venice. Three of the beaches in this area, Fort De Soto's North Beach (2005), Caladesi Island (2008), and Sarasota's Siesta Key (2011), have been named by Dr. Beach as America's Top Beach. The 15th IIFA Awards were held at Tampa Bay Area in April 2014.

Sports attractions, in addition to the teams listed below, include professional quality golf courses, tennis courts, and pools. Ybor and the Channel District in Tampa, downtown St. Petersburg, and the beaches all along the coast all attract a nightlife.

=== Theme parks ===
- Adventure Island in Tampa
- Busch Gardens Tampa Bay in Tampa
- Dinosaur World in Plant City
- Weeki Wachee Springs in Hernando County
- Legoland Florida in Winter Haven, Polk County

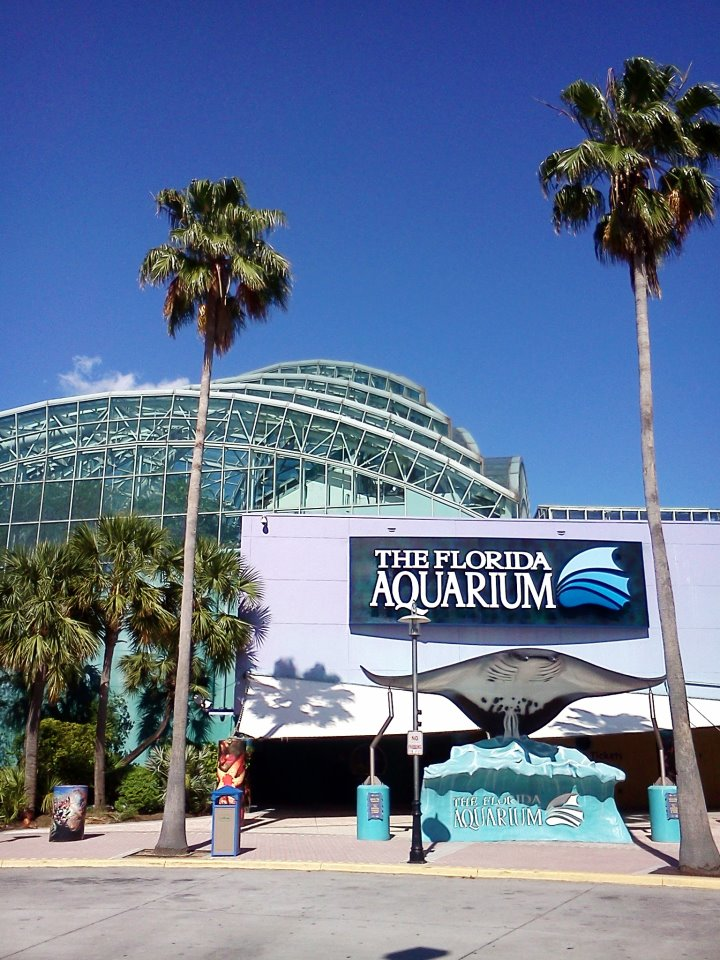
Florida Aquarium

=== Zoos and aquariums ===
- Lowry Park Zoo in Tampa
- Florida Aquarium in Tampa
- Clearwater Marine Aquarium in Clearwater
- Suncoast Seabird Sanctuary in Indian Shores

=== Botanical gardens ===
- Florida Botanical Gardens, part of the Pinewood Cultural Park in Largo
- Sunken Gardens in St. Petersburg, a former tourist attraction now run by the City of St. Petersburg
- USF Botanical Gardens in Tampa
- Marie Selby Botanical Gardens in Sarasota

=== Notable public parks and recreation areas ===
Hillsborough River State Park in Thonotosassa is one of Florida's eight original state parks, and Honeymoon Island State Park, near Dunedin, is Florida's most visited state park. Pinellas County is home to the Pinellas Trail, a 37-mile rail trail connecting Tarpon Springs to St. Petersburg. Skyway Fishing Pier State Park, the remnants of the approaches to the original Sunshine Skyway Bridge, forms the world's largest fishing pier in Pinellas and Manatee counties. The shallow waters and mangrove islands of the bay and gulf make the area popular with kayakers. The gulf is also home to natural and artificial coral reefs that are popular for fishing and scuba diving. Away from the coast, Circle B Bar Reserve in Lakeland (Polk county) has been designated as a Great Florida Birding Trail site, a program of the Florida Fish and Wildlife Conservation Commission.

== Sports ==
=== Sports teams ===
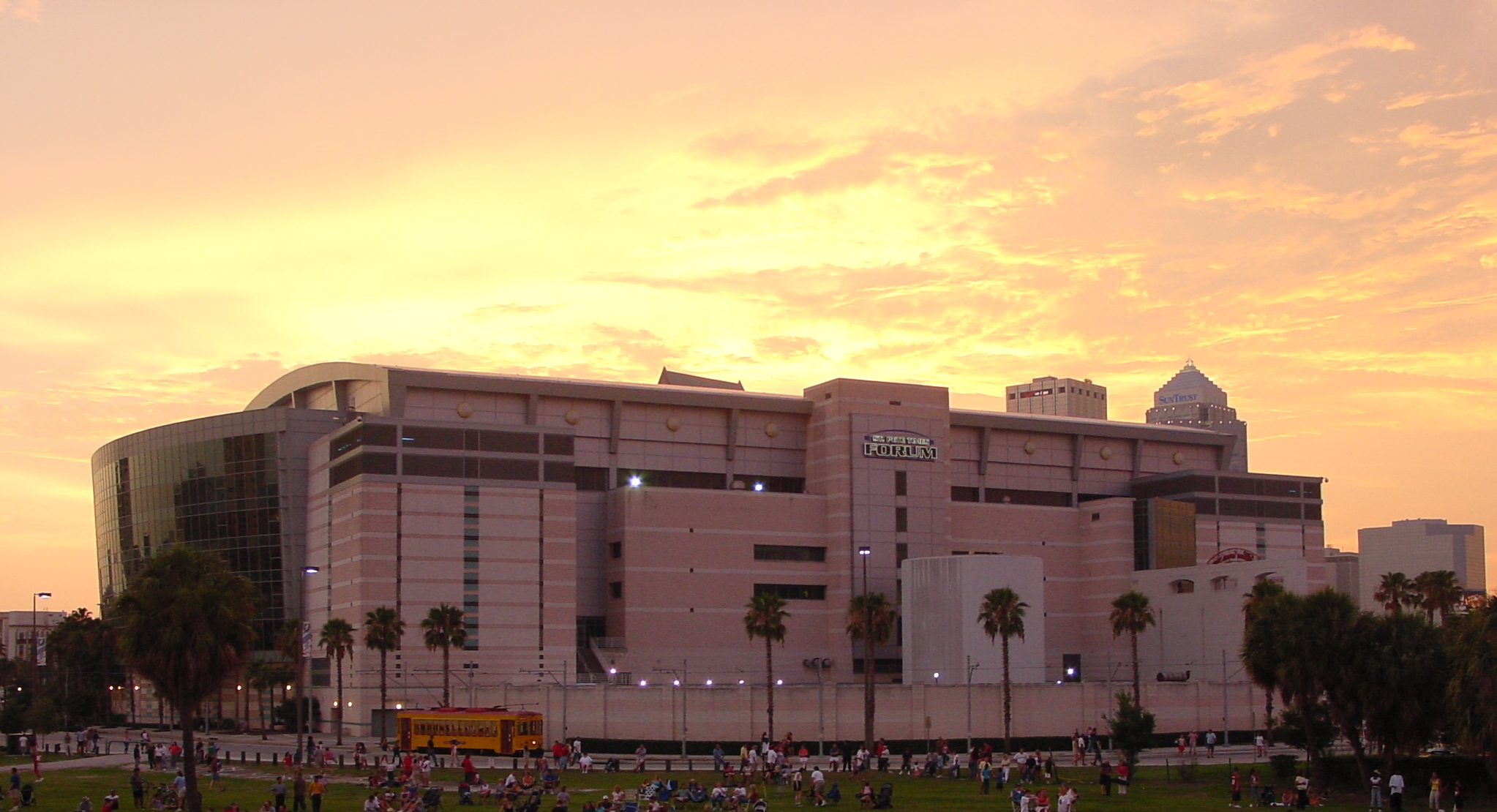
Benchmark International Arena

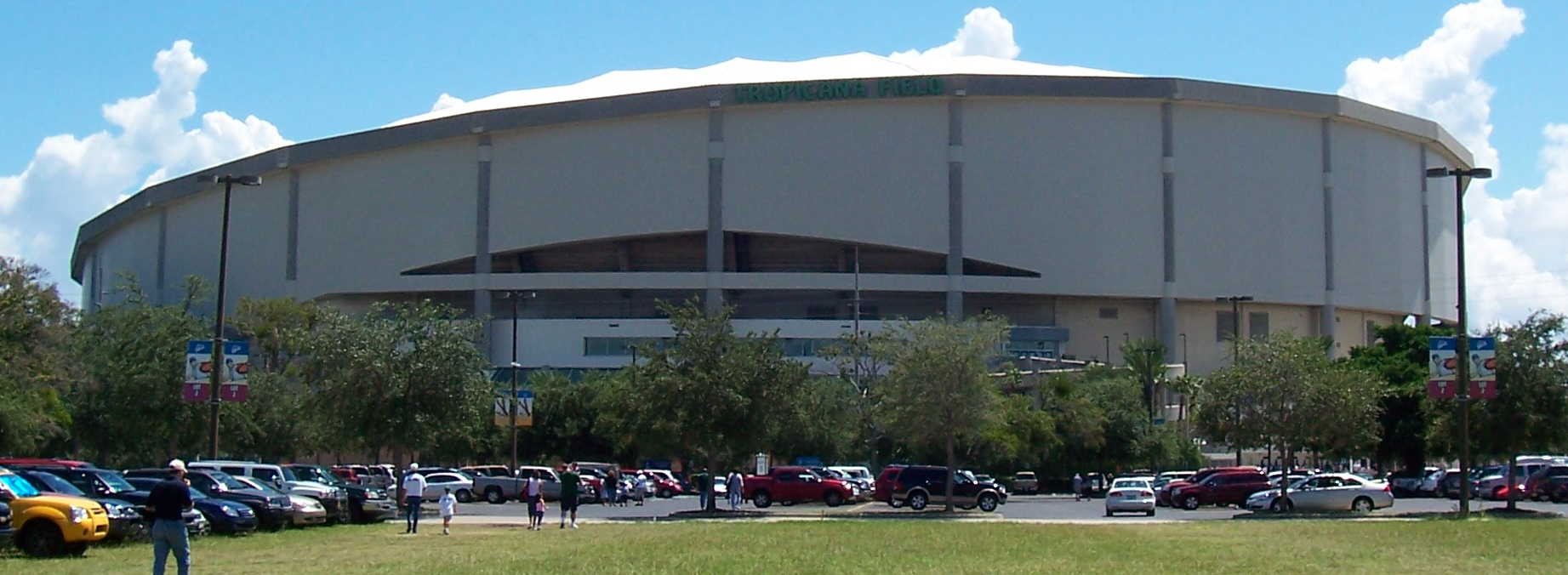
Tropicana Field

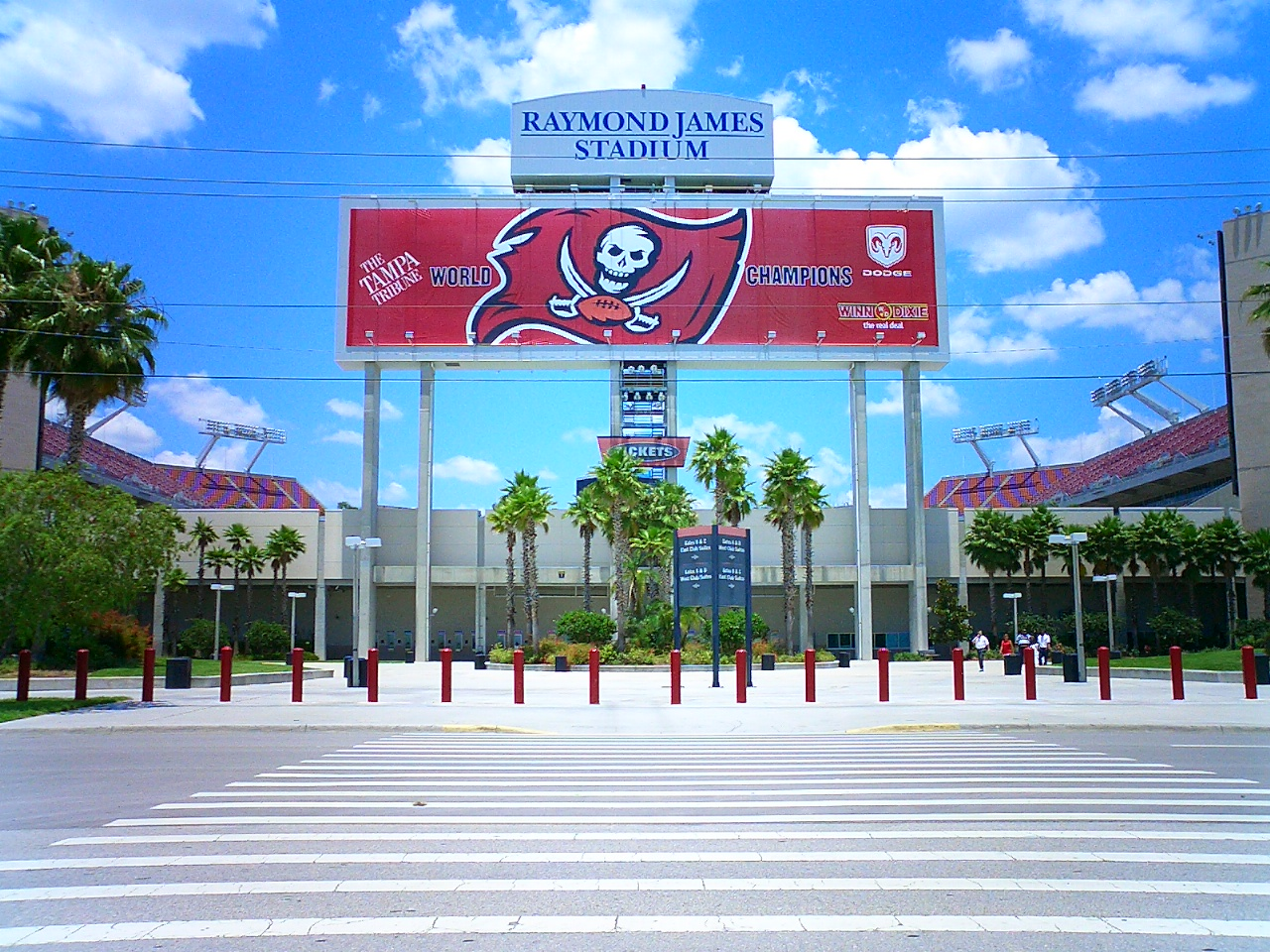
Raymond James Stadium

The Tampa Bay Area is home to three major professional sports teams: the Buccaneers (NFL), Rays (MLB), and Lightning (NHL). The Tampa Bay area also hosts a number of minor-league and college teams.

Team	League	Sport	Stadium	Location
Tampa Bay Buccaneers	NFL	American football	Raymond James Stadium	Tampa
Tampa Bay Lightning	NHL	Ice hockey	Benchmark International Arena	Tampa
Tampa Bay Rays	MLB	Baseball	Tropicana Field	St. Petersburg
Tampa Bay Rowdies	USLC	Soccer	Al Lang Stadium	St. Petersburg
Tampa Bay Sun FC	USLS	Soccer	Riverfront Stadium (Tampa)	Tampa
Florida Tropics SC	MASL	Indoor soccer	RP Funding Center	Lakeland
South Florida Bulls	NCAA DI	various (Note: baseball, men's basketball, women's basketball, beach volleyball, men's and women's cross country, football, men's and women's golf, lacrosse, women's sailing, men's soccer, women's soccer, softball, men's and women's tennis, men's and women's track and field (outdoor and indoor for both), and women's volleyball.)	various	Tampa
Tampa Spartans	NCAA DII	various (Note: Baseball, men's and women's basketball, women's beach volleyball, men's and women's cross country, men's and women's golf, men's and women's lacrosse, women's rowing, men's and women's soccer, men's and women's swimming, women's tennis, and men's and women's track and field (indoor and outdoor for both))	various	Tampa

=== MLB spring training teams ===
Major League Baseball teams have come to the Tampa Bay area for spring training since the Chicago Cubs trained at Tampa's Plant Field in 1913 and the St. Louis Browns trained at St. Petersburg's Coffee Pot Park in 1914. Grapefruit League games are still a favorite pastime for both residents and tourists alike every March. The following five Major League Baseball teams play spring training games in the Tampa Bay area:

- The New York Yankees in Tampa
- The Philadelphia Phillies in Clearwater
- The Toronto Blue Jays in Dunedin
- The Pittsburgh Pirates in Bradenton
- The Detroit Tigers in Lakeland
- The Baltimore Orioles in Sarasota
- The Atlanta Braves in North Port

=== Minor League baseball ===
Minor League baseball has been a constant in the Tampa Bay area for over a century. The Tampa Smokers, St. Petersburg Saints, Lakeland Highlanders, and Bradenton Growers were charter members of the original Florida State League, which began play in 1919 and is now a Class A league. Current local teams of the FSL include:

- The Tampa Tarpons: George M. Steinbrenner Field in Tampa
- The Clearwater Threshers: Spectrum Field in Clearwater
- The Dunedin Blue Jays: TD Ballpark in Dunedin
- The Bradenton Marauders: LECOM Park in Bradenton
- The Lakeland Flying Tigers: Publix Field at Joker Marchant Stadium in Lakeland

The area is also home to several affiliates of the Florida Complex League, a rookie league in which young players gain their first experience in professional baseball.

=== Basketball ===
The Tampa Bay area does not have a professional basketball team. The Orlando Magic is the closest NBA team to the area, 85 miles east. The Toronto Raptors made Tampa their temporary home prior to the 2020–21 NBA season during the COVID-19 pandemic, necessitated by restrictions on travel between Canada and the United States that were in effect. Their "home" games were played at Amalie Arena.

The Tampa Bay area had several teams in minor basketball leagues. The Tampa Bay Titans played in The Basketball League (TBL) from 2019 to 2022. Their home games were played at Pasco–Hernando State College. The St. Pete Tide and the Tampa Gunners played in the Florida Basketball Association (FBA). The Tide's home games were played at St. Petersburg Catholic High School, and the Gunners were a travel team.

=== Sporting events ===
==== Major league sports ====
- Five Super Bowls have been held in Tampa: Super Bowl XVIII in 1984, Super Bowl XXV in 1991, Super Bowl XXXV in 2001, Super Bowl XLIII in 2009, and Super Bowl LV in 2021. Super Bowls XVIII and XXV were played at Tampa Stadium, while Super Bowls XXXV, XLIII and LV were played at Raymond James Stadium. The 1978 AFC–NFC Pro Bowl was held in Tampa at Tampa Stadium.
- The 2008 MLB World Series; Games 1 and 2 were played in St. Petersburg at Tropicana Field.
- The 1999 NHL All-Star Game was held in Tampa at the Ice Palace. It was held again in 2018, having been renamed Amalie Arena by then.
- The 2004 Stanley Cup Finals; Games 1, 2, 5 and 7 were played in Tampa at the St. Pete Times Forum, Games 1, 2, and 5 of the 2015 Stanley Cup Finals were played at Amalie Arena and Games 1, 2, and 5 of the 2021 Stanley Cup Finals were played at Amalie Arena.

==== NCAA sports ====
- The NCAA football ReliaQuest Bowl is held annually at Raymond James Stadium, usually on January 1. The Gasparilla Bowl is also held annually at Raymond James Stadium, usually in December. It began in 2008 at Tropicana Field in St. Petersburg until moving to Tampa in 2018. The NCAA football East–West Shrine Game is held annually at Tropicana Field since 2012, usually in January.
- The 2017 College Football Playoff National Championship was held at Raymond James Stadium on January 9, 2017.
- Two NCAA football ACC Championship Games (2008 and 2009) have been played in Tampa at Raymond James Stadium.
- Benchmark International Arena in Tampa has been the site for various rounds of NCAA Men's and Women's basketball championship tournament over the years, as well as conference tournaments. The 1999 NCAA Men's Final Four was held in St. Petersburg at Tropicana Field. The 2008, 2015 NCAA Women's Final Four and 2019 NCAA Division I women's basketball tournament Final Four were held in Tampa at the Benchmark International Arena/Amalie Arena.
- Five NCAA Division I Men's Soccer Championships have been held in Tampa: 1978, 1979, 1980, 1990 and 1991
- The 2012 and 2016 NCAA Men's Frozen Four were held in Tampa at the Tampa Bay Times Forum/Amalie Arena.
- Tampa will host the 2023 Division I NCAA Women's Volleyball Championship, the 2023 NCAA Division I Men's Frozen Four, the 2025 NCAA Division I Women's Basketball Final Four and the 2026 NCAA Division I Men's Basketball First and Second Rounds, all at Amalie Arena/Benchmark International Arena.
- The University of South Florida (USF) plays an important role in college sports in the Tampa Bay area. After playing at Raymond James Stadium for over 25 years, they are finally constructing its first-ever on-campus football stadium. This will help improve student engagement, campus life, and elevate college football in Tampa Bay. This project is set to be done in 2027.

== Transportation ==
=== Air ===
Tampa International Airport is the largest airport in the region. In addition, St. Pete–Clearwater International Airport and Sarasota–Bradenton International Airport provide access to commercial airliners, and smaller charter craft. Throughout the area are general aviation airports.

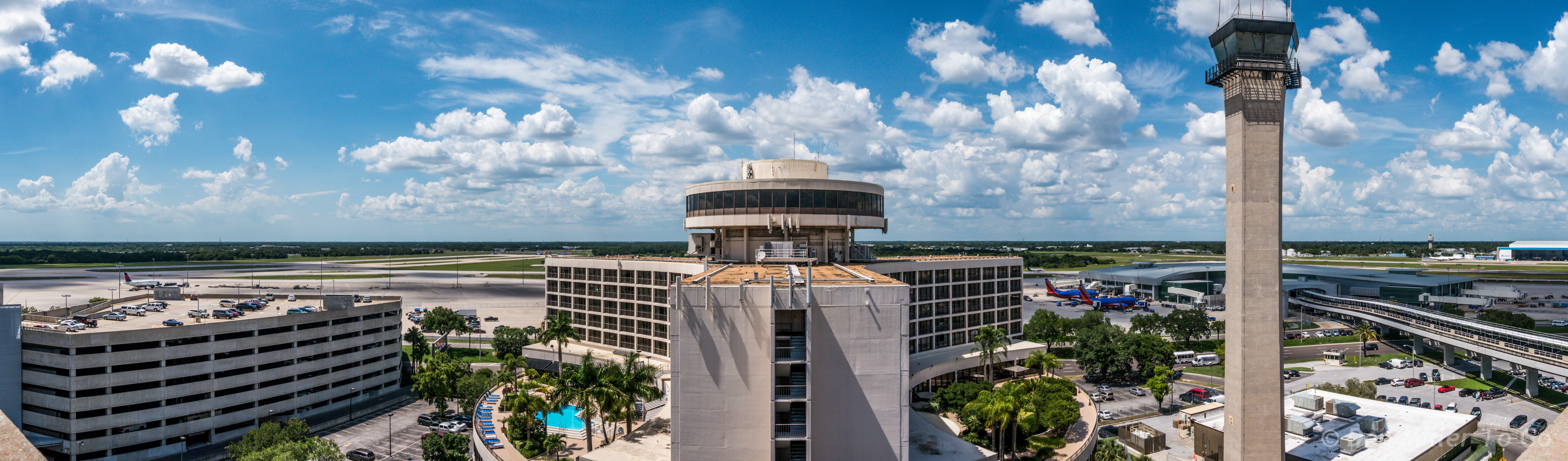
Tampa International Airport panorama

=== Rail ===
Amtrak provides passenger rail service from Union Station in Tampa. CSX provides freight rail service for the region.

=== Water ===
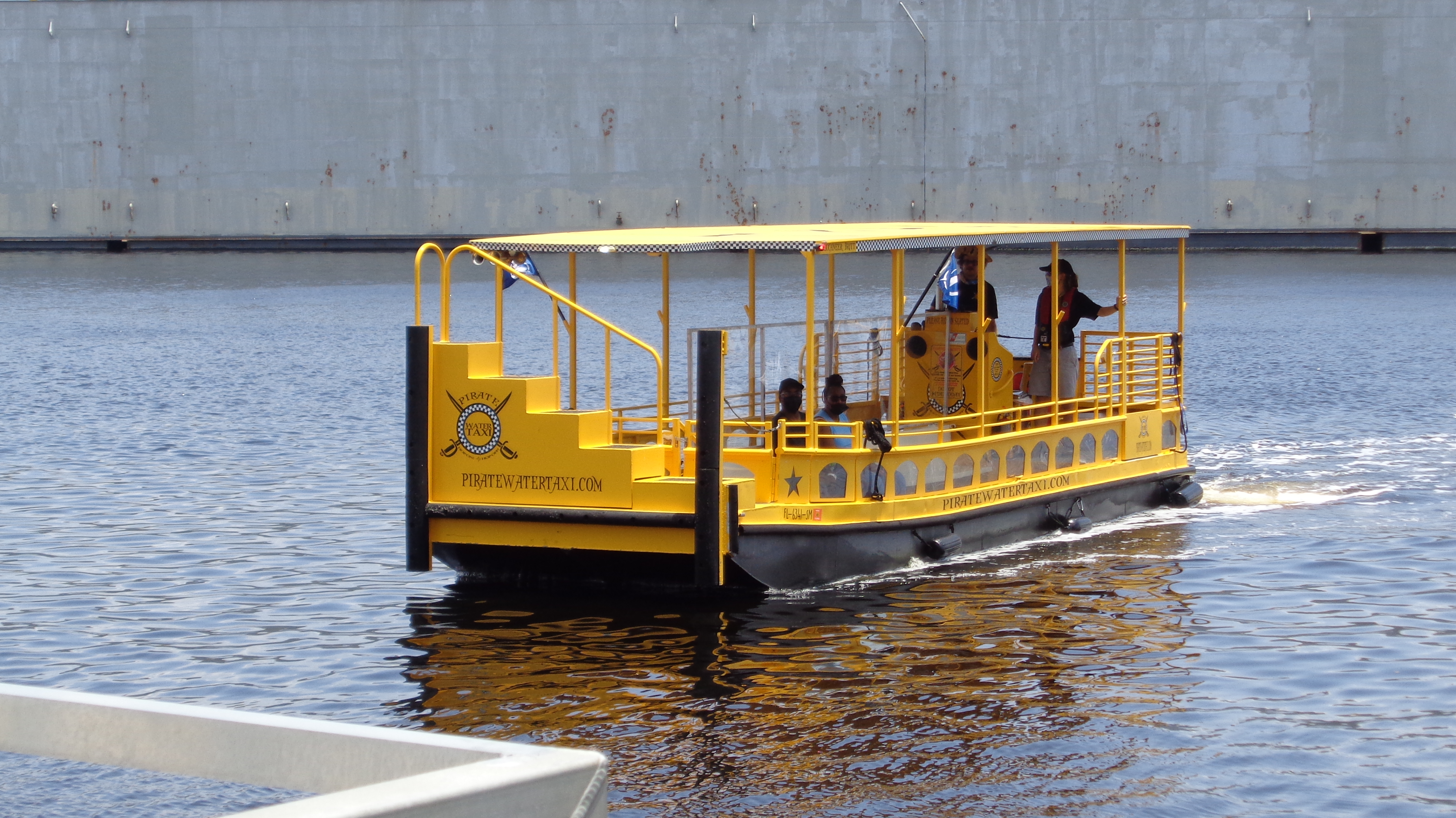
Pirate Water Taxi

The Cross-Bay Ferry has connected Tampa's Channelside District to Downtown St. Petersburg since 2016. The Pirate Water Taxi, also operating since 2016, has several stops along the waterways in the vicinity of Tampa's downtown area and Channelside District.

=== Transit systems ===
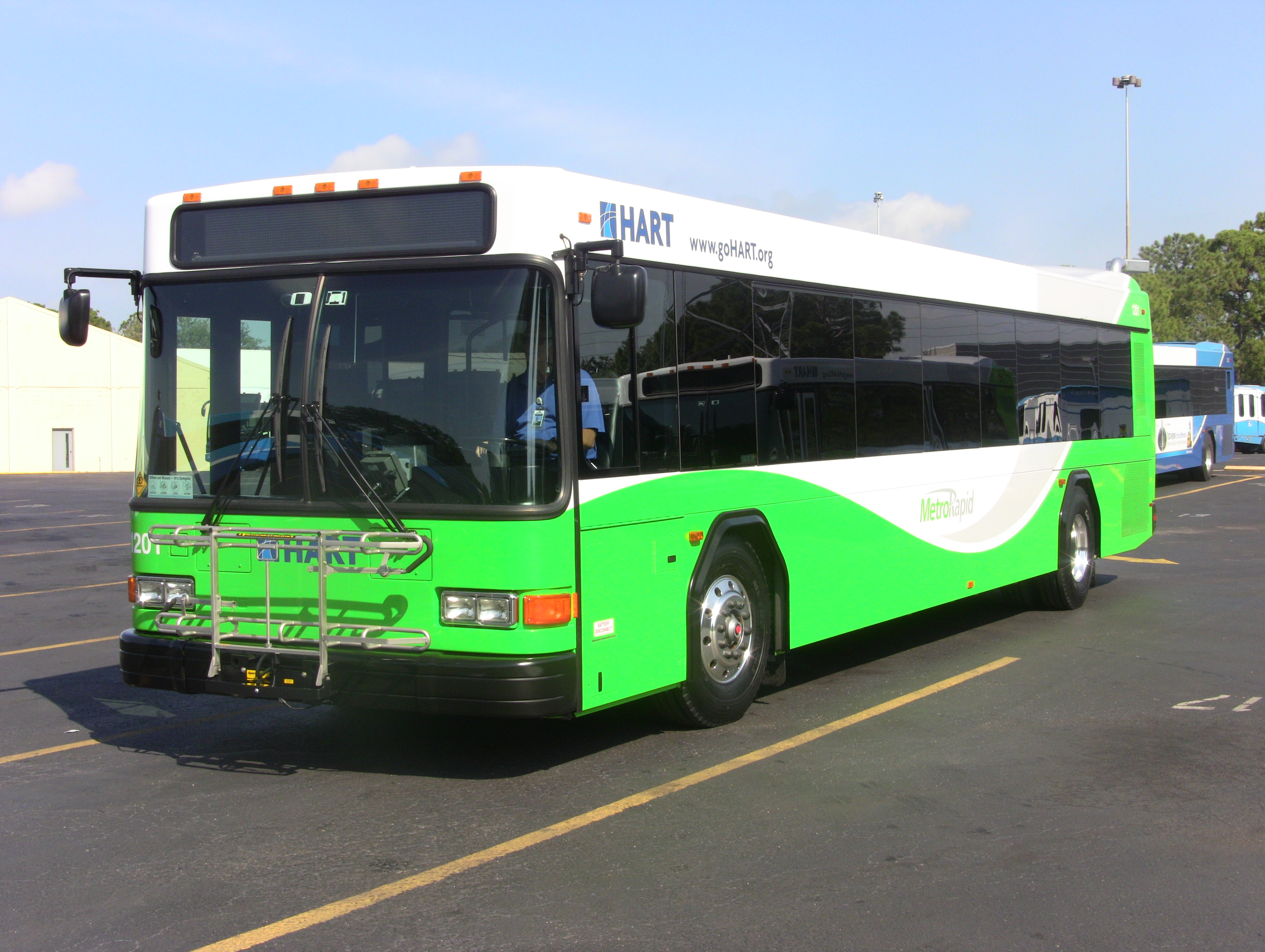
MetroRapid bus in Tampa

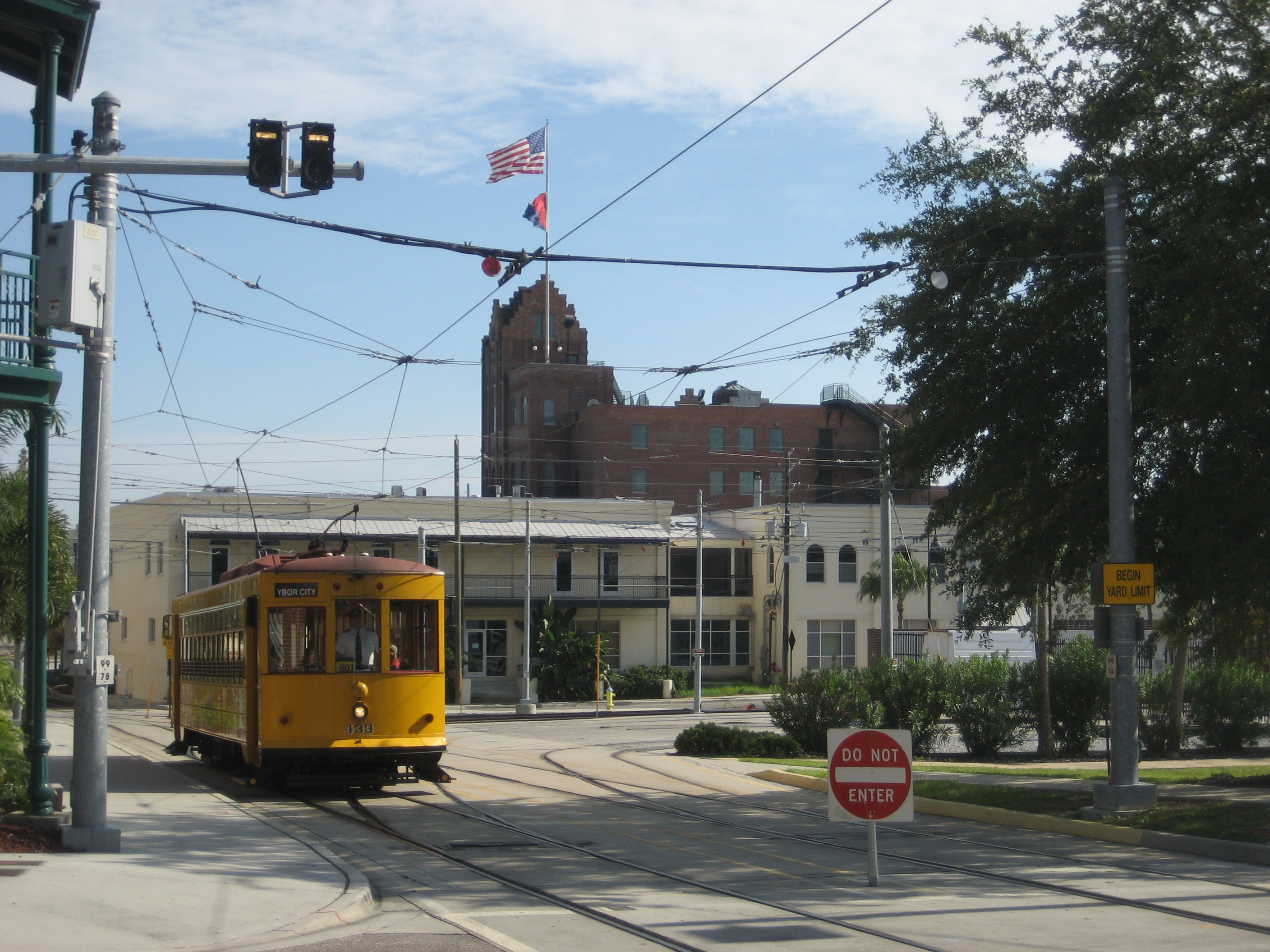
Streetcar in Ybor City

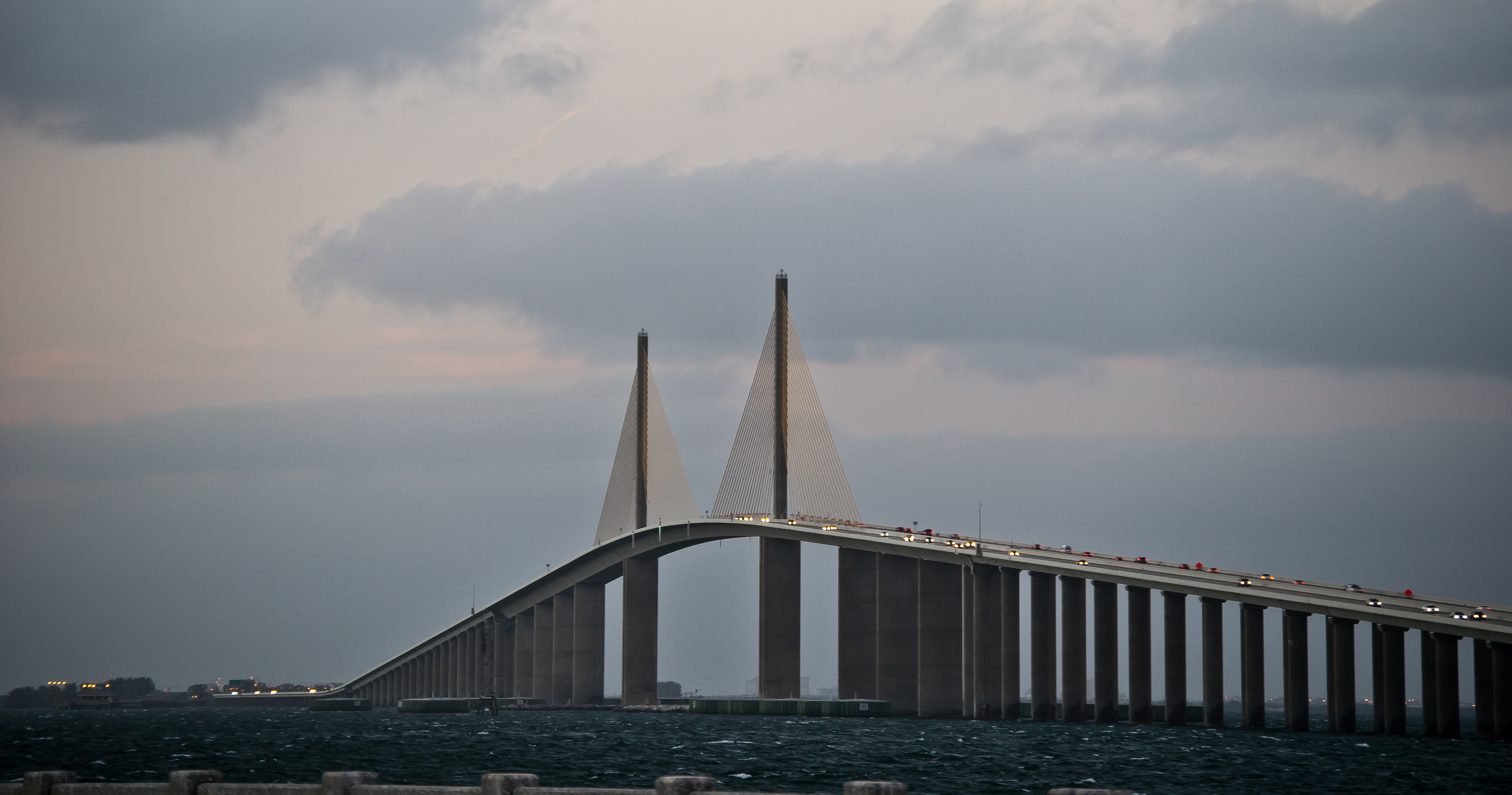
Sunshine Skyway over Tampa Bay

Bus service is provided in Hillsborough County by Hillsborough Area Regional Transit (HART), in Pinellas County by Pinellas Suncoast Transit Authority (PSTA), in Pasco County by Pasco County Public Transportation and in Hernando County by THE Bus. HART and PSTA provide express services between Tampa and Pinellas County, and PSTA provides connections to Pasco County. PSTA also operates a bus rapid transit line running 10.3 miles from downtown St. Petersburg to St. Pete Beach with bus lanes along the St. Petersburg Portion on 1st Avenue North and South. HART operates the TECO Line Streetcar between Downtown Tampa and Ybor City. In 2013, HART also began operating a bus rapid transit system called MetroRapid that runs from Downtown Tampa to the University of South Florida. Despite being labeled as a bus rapid transit line, the HART MetroRapid has no bus lanes along its length.

On July 1, 2007, an intermodal transportation authority was created to serve the seven-county Tampa Bay area. The Tampa Bay Area Regional Transportation Authority (TBARTA) was formed to develop bus, rapid transit, and other transportation options for the region. As of 2026, the Tampa Bay Area is the largest metropolitan area in the United States without any forms of rail rapid transit or commuter rail service.

=== Roads and freeways ===
The Tampa Bay area is served by these interstate highways.

- Interstate 4
- Interstate 75
- Interstate 175
- Interstate 275
- Interstate 375

Hillsborough County is also served by other roadways such as the Lee Roy Selmon Expressway (SR 618) which commutes workers from Brandon into downtown Tampa and the Veterans Expressway/Suncoast Parkway (SR 589) which serves traffic from the Citrus/Hernando County border southward into Tampa. Both of these highways, which are built to limited access freeway standards, are toll roads as is the connecting junction between the Selmon Expressway and Interstate 4.

In Pinellas County, U.S. 19 is the main north–south route through the county and is being upgraded to freeway standards complete with frontage roads to ease congestion through the north part of the county. Also, the Bayside Bridge allows traffic to go from Clearwater into St. Petersburg without having to use U.S. 19.

The Courtney Campbell Causeway (SR 60) is one of the three roads that connect Pinellas County to Hillsborough County across the bay. The other two are the Howard Frankland Bridge (I-275) and Gandy Bridge (U.S. 92). The Sunshine Skyway Bridge is part of I-275 and connects Bradenton and other Manatee County and Sarasota County commuters into Pinellas County.

== See also ==
- Media in the Tampa Bay area
- Central Florida
- Florida Suncoast
- United States metropolitan area
