= Lakeland Derby Dames =

Roller derby league

- Metro area: Lakeland, FL
- Country: USA
- Founded: March 19, 2010
- Dissolved: November 2015
- Teams: Rockabilly Rebels (travel)
- Track type: Flat
- Venue: Sun N Fun - Hangar E
- Org. type: LLC
- Website: http://www.lakelandrollerderby.com

Lakeland Derby Dames was a flat-track roller derby league based in Lakeland, FL. The league was founded in March 2010. The leagues' travel team was the Rockabilly Rebels. They formally practiced and played in Hangar E on the Sun 'n Fun campus.

The team competed against other teams from all over the state of Florida, both at their home venue and away. In 2013 they played Jacksonville RollerGirls, Ocala Cannibals, Gainesville Roller Rebels, South Florida Roller Girls, Sintral Florida Derby Demons, Revolution Roller Derby, North River Rolling Renegades, Thunder City Derby Sirens, Alachua County Rollers, and Deadly Rival Roller Derby.

The team won 12 of their 18 games in the 2013 season.

Their last game was played on October 25, 2015, against The Rolling Valkyries. The league has since been disbanded. Former members of Lakeland Derby Dames have since formed a new organization, Swan City Roller Derby, which aims to begin hosting games in January 2017.
