= TBARTA =

Florida-based transportation agency

Tampa Bay Area Regional Transit Authority
- Founded: July 1, 2007; 19 years ago
- Ceased operation: December 31, 2023
- Headquarters: 4350 West Cypress Drive, Suite 700
- Locale: Tampa, Florida
- Service area: Hernando County, Hillsborough County, Manatee County, Pasco County, Pinellas County
- Website: https://www.gohart.org/Pages/GoHart-Home.aspx

The Tampa Bay Area Regional Transit Authority, or TBARTA, was a regional transportation agency of the U.S. state of Florida which was created on July 1, 2007. Upon its creation in 2007, TBARTA was originally established as the West Central Florida Metropolitan Planning Organization Chairs Coordinating Committee (often abbreviated as the West Central Florida MPO CCC). The organization was renamed the Transportation Authority MPO CCC in 2016. In 2017, it received its current name, TBARTA. At this time, Citrus and Sarasota counties were removed from its service area. The transportation agency ceased all operations on December 31, 2023, after the governing board voted unanimously to disband. The purpose of the agency was "to plan, develop, finance, construct, own, purchase, operate, maintain, relocate, equip, repair, and manage multimodal systems in Hernando, Hillsborough, Manatee, Pasco, and Pinellas Counties." The agency coordinated its efforts with the Florida Department of Transportation to improve transportation in the Tampa Bay Area.

== Regional Transportation Master Plan ==
TBARTA adopted its first Regional Transportation Master Plan in 2009. The inaugural master plan identified the vision for the regional transit network. An update was completed in 2011 that introduced a regional freight and a regional roadway network to the plan.

The 2013 Master Plan Update was a minor update to refine all three networks, and incorporate the progress made locally and regionally towards implementing the regional vision.

The 2015 Master Plan Update was developed by TBARTA’s board and committees in collaboration with the West Central Florida Metropolitan Planning Organization Chairs Coordinating Committee — representing each of the region's Metropolitan Planning Organizations and Transportation Planning Organization. The 2015 Update ensures consistency with the Metropolitan Planning Organizations' Long Range Transportation Plans and updates the CCC's Regional Long Range Transportation Plan.

For 2015, TBARTA and the Chairs Coordinating Committee eliminated duplication of efforts for the Master Plan and Regional Long Range Transportation Plans updates by making them one and the same.

During its 2017 legislative session, the Florida Legislature installed TBARTA as Tampa Bay’s regional transit facilitating arm. In March, 2018, Gov. Rick Scott authorized $1 million allowing the authority to develop a business strategy to implement regional transit.

On June 22, 2018, Executive Director Ray Chiaramonte announced his plans to resign, due to his decision to run for Hillsborough County Commissioner.

In September 2018, David Green, former CEO of the Greater Richmond Transit Company, was named as the new executive director, replacing Ray Chairmonte.

In June 2020, TBARTA released another master plan for fiscal years 2021-2031 marketed as Envision 2030: The Future of Transit in Tampa Bay.

== Disbanding ==
TBARTA was disbanded on December 31, 2023, after the governing board voted to do so unanimously. The reasons for the disbanding of the agency was due to a lack of state funding. According to Florida State Representative Jeff Holcomb, in a email to the Tampa Bay Times the representative said the agency had “unrealistic transportation options, like unmanned multi-passenger helicopters.” And that the agency “tried to gain access to CSX rail lines, which never materialized and we heard Hillsborough and the city of Tampa refuse to work with the authority.” The Florida House and Senate had bills to dismantle the agency at the time of the disbanding. The counties that contributed funds to the agency were reimbursed with the funds left in the TBARTA account which was estimated to be around $200,000.

Although the agency ceased operations on December 31, 2023, its remaining invoices and bank accounts were scheduled to be closed out by March 31, 2024, with an option to extend the process through the end of the fiscal year on June 30, 2024.

Ruth Steiner, a professor of urban and regional planning and director of the Center for Health and the Built Environment at the University of South Florida, emphasizes the continued need for a coordinated, region-wide transit plan for the Tampa Bay area, even if TBARTA is no longer active.

== Transit ==
As of 2023, TBARTA does not operate any transit system, but the agency was discussing developing various modes of premium transit service, including express bus, bus rapid transit, light rail, and commuter rail.

In 2017, The Florida Legislature renamed the organization to The Tampa Bay Area Regional Transit Authority.

In November 2018, TBARTA's board approved the Regional Transit Feasibility Plan, with a focus on establishing a 41-mile, bus-rapid transit option connecting Wesley Chapel to St. Petersburg via Interstate 275. The project is designed to serve as a catalyst for other transit options designed to reduce congestion on roads.

As of 2019, TBARTA managed a range of commuter services in the Tampa Bay region, designed to help commuters save money, reduce traffic congestion, and help the environment. These services include Vanpool, Carpool, BikeBuddy, a regional school commuter program, and an emergency ride home program.

The agency’s vanpool program played a role in reducing emissions by decreasing traffic congestion in the Tampa Bay Region. In 2021, the program was credited with helping eliminate an estimated 4.2 million pounds of CO_{2} emissions. It was discontinued on December 31, 2023, following TBARTA’s dissolution. The service contract was formally terminated on the same day the organization ceased operations.

== Corridor studies ==
After the Regional Transportation Master Plan was adopted in 2009, several high-priority corridor studies were initiated by TBARTA, including:

- St. Petersburg to Clearwater through the Greater Gateway Area (Pinellas Alternatives Analysis)
- Howard Frankland Bridge PD&E Study and Regional Transit Corridor Evaluation
- SR 54/SR 56 Express Bus/Managed Lanes Project Concept Development Study
- USF to Wesley Chapel Transit Corridor Evaluation
- I-75 Regional Bus Sarasota/Bradenton to Downtown Tampa Conceptual Analysis Study
- Westshore Area to Crystal River/Inverness Transit Corridor Evaluation
- I-75 Regional Bus Wesley Chapel to Downtown Tampa Conceptual Analysis Study
- Short-Term Regional Premium Transportation Enhancements Study
- Extension of Premium Services from Sarasota to Bradenton and North Port Regional Transit Corridor Evaluation

== Priority projects ==
In cooperation with its regional partners, TBARTA identified eight Regional Priority Projects for 2015, based on factors such as connectivity, regionalism, ability to implement, mobility, and support, among others. These projects are:

- Interchange improvements at I/275, SR 60, and Memorial Highway, located near the Tampa International Airport
- Continued improvements to the SR 54/56 Corridor in Pasco County
- Construction of the Gateway Expressway in Pinellas County
- Replacement of the northbound Howard Frankland Bridge
- Tampa Bay Express (Starter Projects), which are express lanes on the interstate system in Hillsborough and Pinellas Counties to support roadway and premium transit connections
- TIA People Mover Connection to the future Westshore Intermodal Center
- University Parkway/I-75 Interchange area improvements

On February 28th, 2022, the Suncoast Parkway 2 (phase 1) extension opened. It extended the previous terminus of US. Highway 98 in Hernando County to State Road 44 in Citrus County.

== Managed lanes ==
Managed lanes are an important part of step-by-step implementation of the regional transportation vision. Managed lanes are commonly referred to as "express lanes", where operational strategies such as pricing, vehicle eligibility, and/or access control are implemented to regulate demand and utilize available capacity. Examples of managed lanes include toll lanes, reversible lanes, value priced lanes, high-occupancy vehicle lanes, and thru lanes (where managed lanes on a toll road are not an extra toll). The TBARTA Managed Lanes network includes the existing toll facilities in the region as well as a mid-term and long-term network of managed lanes identified by the TBARTA Master Plan and by the Florida Department of Transportation.

== Commuter services ==
On April 30, 2010, TBARTA merged with Bay Area Commuter Services, the state-funded provider of commuter options programs in five of the seven TBARTA members counties (Citrus, Hernando, Hillsborough, Pasco, and Pinellas). In doing so, TBARTA became the official Tampa Bay Area regional provider of commuter options including: carpool, vanpool, Schoolpool, Bike Buddy, Emergency Ride Home, remote work, compressed work schedule, and commuter benefits.

== One Call, One Click ==
The One Call, One Click program underscores transportation support needs and services for veterans, through a $1.1 million grant from the Federal Transit and Veterans Administrations. The aim of the grant is to better connect veterans, military families, the disabled, and regular citizens with the available transportation resources across the seven-county region, in one convenient online and call-center portal. Work continues on this program, with staff working to identify transportation service providers, contract services for call center activities, and develop a more robust online element. TBARTA was also successful in obtaining a secondary FTA grant to be used to promote and market the One Call/One Click program. The funds must be expended by September 2017.

== Partners ==
Citrus County Transit, Florida Department of Transportation, Florida Department of Transportation District One Commuter Services, Hillsborough Area Regional Transit Authority, Hernando County Metropolitan Planning Organization, Hillsborough County Metropolitan Planning Organization, Manatee County Area Transit, One Bay, Pasco County Metropolitan Planning Organization, Pasco County Public Schools, Pasco County Public Transportation, Pinellas County Metropolitan Planning Organization, Pinellas Realtor Organization, Pinellas Suncoast Transit Authority, Polk County Transportation Planning Organization, Sarasota-Manatee Metropolitan Planning Organization, Sarasota County Area Transit, Tampa Bay Partnership, Tampa Bay Regional Planning Council, Tampa Downtown Partnership, Hernando County Transit (TheBus), West Central Florida Metropolitan Planning Organization Chairs Coordinating Committee.

== Governing board ==
The governing board of TBARTA has 17 members (15 voting members and two non-voting advisors). The voting members consist of the following:

- One elected official appointed by the respective county commissions from Citrus, Hernando, Hillsborough, Pasco, Pinellas, Manatee, and Sarasota counties;
- One member is appointed by the TBARTA West Central Florida Metropolitan Planning Organization Chairs Coordinating Committee who must be a chair of one of the five Metropolitan Planning Organizations in the region (Citrus County is a Transportation Planning Organization);
- Two members are the mayor or the mayor’s designee of the respective largest municipality within the areas served by the Pinellas Suncoast Transit Authority and the Hillsborough Area Regional Transit Authority;
- One member is the mayor, or designee, of the largest municipality within Manatee or Sarasota County, providing that the membership rotates every two years;
- Also on the board are four business-community representatives appointed by the governor, each of whom must reside in one of the seven counties of TBARTA; and,
- The two non-voting advisors shall be the district secretaries of the Florida Department of Transportation within the seven-county area of TBARTA (District's 1 and 7).

The members appointed by the respective commissions, TBARTA Metropolitan Planning Organization's Chairs Coordinating Committee, or mayors serve two-year terms and may serve no more than three consecutive terms. The governor-appointed members serve three-year terms and may serve only two consecutive terms.

== Citizens Advisory Committee ==
The TBARTA Citizens Advisory Committee is made up of residents and business persons from around the region. Members are appointed by the TBARTA Board members and volunteer their time to advise the Board on a range of issues that affect TBARTA and the region.

== Transit Management Committee ==
The TBARTA Transit Management Committee is made up of the region’s transit agency directors, who advise the Board on implementation of the Regional Transportation Master Plan.

== Public engagement ==
TBARTA maintains an ongoing public conversation about regional transportation, via social media on Facebook, Twitter, YouTube, and Instagram. During periods of work to update the Regional Master Plan, TBARTA also holds telephone-based town hall meetings, which garner thousands of participants. The public is always invited to TBARTA's regularly scheduled board and committee meetings as well. Individuals wishing to contest a decision made at a meeting are responsible for ensuring that a record of the proceedings exists for any appeal. TBARTA additionally provides accommodations for people with disabilities who request assistance in advance.
