= Suncoast Seabird Sanctuary =

Bird sanctuary in Florida, United States

Coordinates: 27.83684°N 82.83681°W

The Suncoast Seabird Sanctuary was a bird sanctuary in Indian Shores, Florida, that was in operation from 1971 to 2016. In 1990, its bird hospital was called "the largest wild bird hospital in North America". The sanctuary operated solely on private donations and was the largest not-for-profit wild bird sanctuary and rehabilitation center in the United States. The sanctuary was dedicated to the Rescue, Repair, Rehabilitation and Release of sick and/or injured wild birds, and provided a permanent home to non-releasable birds in a safe and healthy environment.

In January 2013, the sanctuary experienced a staff walk-out due to non-payment of wages. The sanctuary remained open, thanks to the tireless efforts of a handful of dedicated individuals. In April 2013, the Sumter Disaster Animal Rescue Team helped the Sanctuary refurbish and prep the wild bird hospital to reopen.

Due to a legal settlement in September 2016, the Suncoast Seabird Sanctuary ceased operations and closed after 45 years of service. Following the closing of Suncoast, a new non-profit organization called the Seaside Seabird Sanctuary moved into the same Indian Shores location. The new organization rescues and rehabilitates birds from all over the Tampa Bay area. Continued relationships in the community with veterinarians, wildlife experts and volunteers has kept the sanctuary viable.
