= List of county roads in Hillsborough County, Florida =

- County road shields used in Florida

Highway names
- Interstates: Interstate X (I-X)
- US Highways: U.S. Highway X (US X)
- State: State Road X (SR X)
- County: County Road X (CR X)

System links
- County roads in Florida; County roads in Hillsborough County

The following is a list of county roads in Hillsborough County, Florida. All county roads are maintained by the county in which they reside, however not all of them are marked with standard MUTCD approved county road shields.

== County routes in Hillsborough County ==
Route	Road Name(s)	Dir	From		To		Notes
CR 39		S/N	CR 39 Indeterminate point	Manatee County line south of Fort Lonesome Plant City	SR 39 / SR 60 SR 39	North-northeast of Hopewell North of Plant City	Former SR 39 Inventoried by FDOT as part of SR 39, but signed as CR 39 at its northern terminus
CR 39A	West Alexander Street; South Alexander Street; North Alexander Street	W/E and S/N	SR 39	Plant City	SR 39	North of Plant City	Former SR 39A; signed as SR 39A north of US 92 (SR 600) and as part of SR 39
CR 39B	East Park Road; South Park Road	W/E and S/N	SR 39	Plant City	CR 574 / CR 574A	Plant City	Former SR 39B
CR 573	South 78th Street	S/N	SR 676	Palm River–Clair Mel	SR 60 / South 78th Street	Palm River–Clair Mel	Former SR 573
CR 574	East 7th Avenue; East Broadway Avenue; Hewitt Street South Park Road	W/E S/N	East 7th Avenue / North 21st Street CR 39B / CR 574A	Tampa Plant City	SR 574 US 92 (SR 600) / SR 553	Mango Plant City	Former SR 574 (current SR 574 was SR 574A) Former SR 574
CR 574A	Sammonds Road East Alsobrook Street; Coronet Road; Medulla Road	W/E	SR 574 SR 39 / South Alsobrook Street	Plant City Plant City	Sammonds Road / South Woodrow Wilson Street Medulla Road	Plant City Polk County line east-southeast of Coronet	Former SR 574A
CR 574B	Turkey Creek Road	S/N	SR 574 / Turkey Creek Road	Plant City	US 92 (SR 600)	West-northwest of Plant City	Former SR 574B
CR 576	Memorial Highway	W/E	SR 580 / CR 589	Town 'n' Country	Eisenhower Boulevard / SR 589	Tampa	Former SR 576
CR 579	Lakewood Drive Morris Bridge Road	S/N	Saffold Road SR 60 / Lakewood Drive SR 574 / Lemon Street CR 582A	Manatee County line south-southeast of Wimauma Brandon Mango Northwest of Thonotosassa	SR 674 SR 574 / Lakewood Drive US 301 (SR 41) CR 579	East of Wimauma Mango Thonotosassa Pasco County line in Tampa	Former SR 579 Former SR 579 Former SR 579
CR 580	Bullard Parkway; Temple Terrace Highway; Harney Road Taylor Road; Thonotosassa Road; Sam Allen Road Park Road	W/E W/E S/N	SR 580 / SR 583 Fort King Highway / Main Street / Brigann Yard Way I-4 (SR 400) / SR 553	Temple Terrace Thonotosassa Plant City	Harney Road at an overpass for I-75 (SR 93A) North Wilder Road CR 580	East of Temple Terrace North of Plant City Plant City	Former SR 580 Former SR 580
CR 581	North 30th Street; Bruce B. Downs Boulevard	S/N	SR 580 / North 30th Street	Tampa	CR 581	Pasco County line south of Wesley Chapel	Former SR 581
CR 582	Lake Magdalene Boulevard Knights Griffin Road; Tarpon Springs Road; Gunn Highway; Lutz-Lake Fern Road	W/E	SR 678 US 301 (SR 41)	Southwest of Chapman Thonotosassa	US 41 Bus. (SR 685) CR 582	South of Chapman Polk County line northeast of Midway	Former SR 582
CR 582A	Fletcher Avenue	W/E	CR 587A US 41 (SR 45) / SR 579	North of Tampa North of Tampa	US 41 Bus. (SR 685) / SR 579 I-75/CR 579	North of Tampa Northwest of Thonotosassa	Former SR 582A
CR 582B	50th Street	S/N	SR 582 / North 50th Street	Tampa	CR 582A	Tampa	Former SR 582B
CR 583	North 56th Street	S/N	SR 580 / CR 580	Temple Terrace	CR 582	Temple Terrace	Former SR 583A
CR 583A	Sunset Lane	S/N	US 41 (SR 45) / Crystal Grove Boulevard	Lutz	Sunset Lane / Livingston Avenue	Lutz	Former SR 583A
CR 584	West Waters Avenue	W/E	CR 589 / West Waters Avenue	Town 'n' Country	SR 580 / CR 587A / West Waters Avenue	Egypt Lake–Leto	Former SR 584
CR 585A	McKinley Drive	S/N	SR 580 / North 40th Street	Tampa	SR 582 / Spectrum Boulevard	Tampa	Former SR 585A
CR 587	West Shore Boulevard Gunn Highway	S/N S/N and W/E	US 92 / South West Shore Boulevard CR 587	Tampa Pasco County line north-northwest of Lake Fern	SR 616 / North West Shore Boulevard SR 580 / SR 597	Tampa Egypt Lake–Leto–Greater Carrollwood line	Former SR 587
CR 587A	North Armenia Avenue; Waters Avenue North Armenia Avenue; West Fletcher Avenue; Lake Magdalene Boulevard	W/E	SR 580 / North Armenia Avenue West Jorome Drive / North Armenia Avenue	Tampa Tampa	US 41 (SR 45) / East Waters Avenue SR 678	Tampa South of Chapman	Former SR 587 (Waters Avenue east of SR 580) and SR 587A
CR 589	Sheldon Road	S/N	SR 580 / CR 576	Town 'n' Country	CR 587 / Citrus Park Lane	Citrus Park	Former SR 589
CR 598	West Lambright Street; West Sligh Avenue	W/E	SR 580 / Pine Crest Manor Boulevard	Egypt Lake–Leto	West Sligh Avenue / North Armenia Avenue	Tampa	Former SR 598
CR 640	Lithia Pinecrest Road	W/E	SR 60 / North Pinewood Avenue	Brandon	CR 640	Polk County line southeast of Keysville	Former SR 640
CR 672	Dickman Road; Big Bend Road Thatcher Road	W/E	Dickman Road US 301 (SR 43) / Paseo Al Mar Boulevard	Apollo Beach East of Apollo Beach	US 301 (SR 43) / Big Bend Road Alafia River State Park	East-northeast of Apollo Beach South-southeast of Lithia	Former SR 672 (east of Balm)
CR 674	Gulf City Road	W/E	Cockroach Bay Road	Gulf City	US 41 (SR 45)	Gulf City	Former SR 674
CR 676	East Keysville Road Nichols Road; Carey Road	W/E	CR 39 / West Keysville Road CR 676	Alafia Keysville	CR 640 CR 676	Northeast of Welcome Polk County line northeast of Edison Junction	Extension of SR 676 Former SR 676
CR 676A	Madison Avenue; Progress Boulevard; Bloomingdale Avenue	W/E	US 41 (SR 45) / Pendola Point Road	East of Port Sutton	CR 640 / Bloomingdale Avenue	Bloomingdale–Brandon line	Former SR 676A
CR 678	Ehrlich Road; Bearss Avenue	W/E					extension of SR 678
CR 685A	Van Dyke Road	W/E	CR 587 / Van Dyke Road	Keystone	SR 597 / Van Dyke Road	Northdale–Cheval line	Former SR 685A
