= U.S. Route 41 in Florida =

Highway in Florida

U.S. Highway 41

Route information
- Maintained by FDOT
- Length: 478.920 mi (770.747 km)
- Existed: November 11, 1926–present

Major junctions
- South end: US 1 in Miami
- I-95 in Miami; Florida's Turnpike Extension in University Park; US 17 in Punta Gorda; US 301 in Sarasota; US 19 near Palmetto; I-275 near Palmetto; I-4 in Tampa; US 98 / SR 50 in Brooksville; US 27 / US 441 in High Springs; I-10 near Lake City
- North end: US 41 / SR 7 south of Melrose, GA

Location
- Country: United States
- State: Florida
- Counties: Miami-Dade, Collier, Lee, Charlotte, Sarasota, Manatee, Hillsborough, Pasco, Hernando, Citrus, Marion, Levy, Alachua, Columbia, Hamilton

Highway system
- United States Numbered Highway System; List; Special; Divided; Florida State Highway System; Interstate; US; State; Former; Pre‑1945; Toll; Scenic
| ← SR 40 | → SR 41 |
| ← SR 597 | SR 599 | → SR 600 |
| ← SR 93A | US 94 | → SR 94 |

U.S. Highway 41 (US 41) in the state of Florida is a north–south United States Highway. It runs 479 miles (771 km) from Miami in South Florida northwest to the Georgia state line north of the Lake City area. Within the state, US 41 is paralleled by Interstate 75 (I-75) all the way from Miami to Georgia (on the northern border), and I-75 has largely supplanted US 41 as a major highway.

Like all highways designated by the American Association of State Highway and Transportation Officials (AASHTO) in Florida, US 41 always carries a hidden state road number designated by the Florida Department of Transportation (FDOT):

- State Road 90 (SR 90) from US 1 (SR 5) in Miami to the junction with 5th Avenue/9th Street/Tamiami Trail North (US 41/SR 45) in Naples.
- SR 45 from US 41 (SR 90) in Naples to the junction with US 441 (SR 25) and North Main Street (CR 236) in High Springs, with the following exceptions:
  - SR 45A between the north and south termini of US 41 Business (SR 45) in Sarasota County.
  - SR 684 from the junction with the south end of US 41 Business (SR 45) to 44th Avenue Connection in unincorporated Manatee County.
  - SR 55 from 44th Avenue Connection to the north end of US 41 Business (SR 45) in Palmetto.
  - State Road 599 from the junction of the south end of US 41 Business (SR 45) and SR 676 east near Tampa to US 92 (SR 600) in Tampa.
  - SR 600 from US 41 south (SR 599 south) to Nebraska Avenue (SR 45 south) in Tampa.
- SR 25 from the junction with US 441 (SR 25), US 41 (SR 45) and North Main Street (CR 236) in High Springs to the Georgia state line near Jennings.

Concurrencies include US 301 between Bradenton and Palmetto, US 92 in Tampa, US 98 and SR 50A in Brooksville, SR 44 in Inverness, US 27 between Williston and High Springs, US 441 between High Springs and Lake City, and US 129 between Hillcoat and Jasper.

According to both AASHTO documentation and FDOT straight line diagram inventory, the defined southern terminus of US 41 is located at Collins Avenue in Miami Beach, but FDOT has chosen not to sign the final leg of the route past SR 90 since 2000. From there, the route runs concurrently with SR A1A westbound, then south along US 1/SR 5, before meeting the route's signed southern terminus at Brickell Avenue.

== Route description ==
=== Miami to Tampa ===
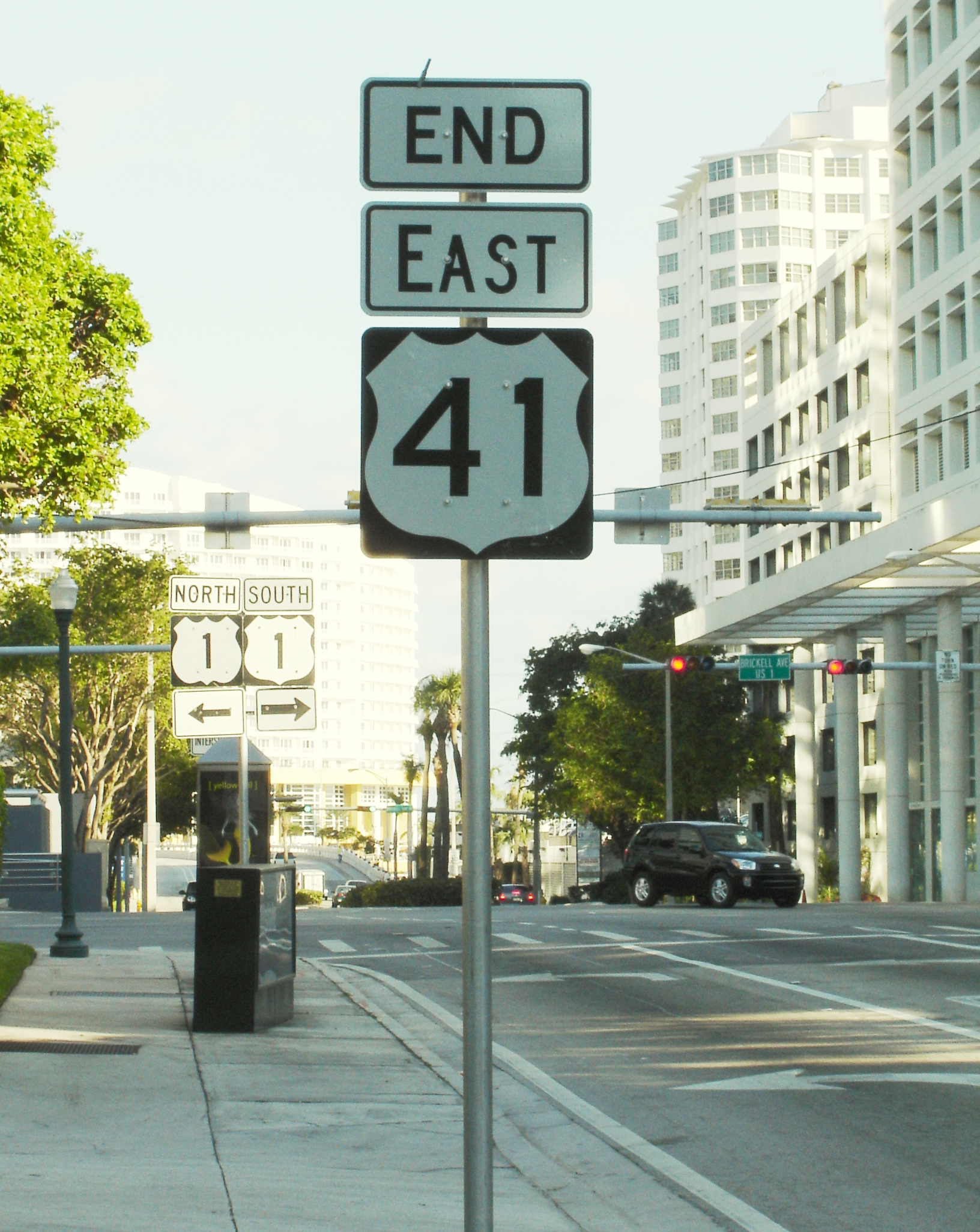
The southern end of US 41 at US 1 in Miami, signed as an east–west highway in 2006

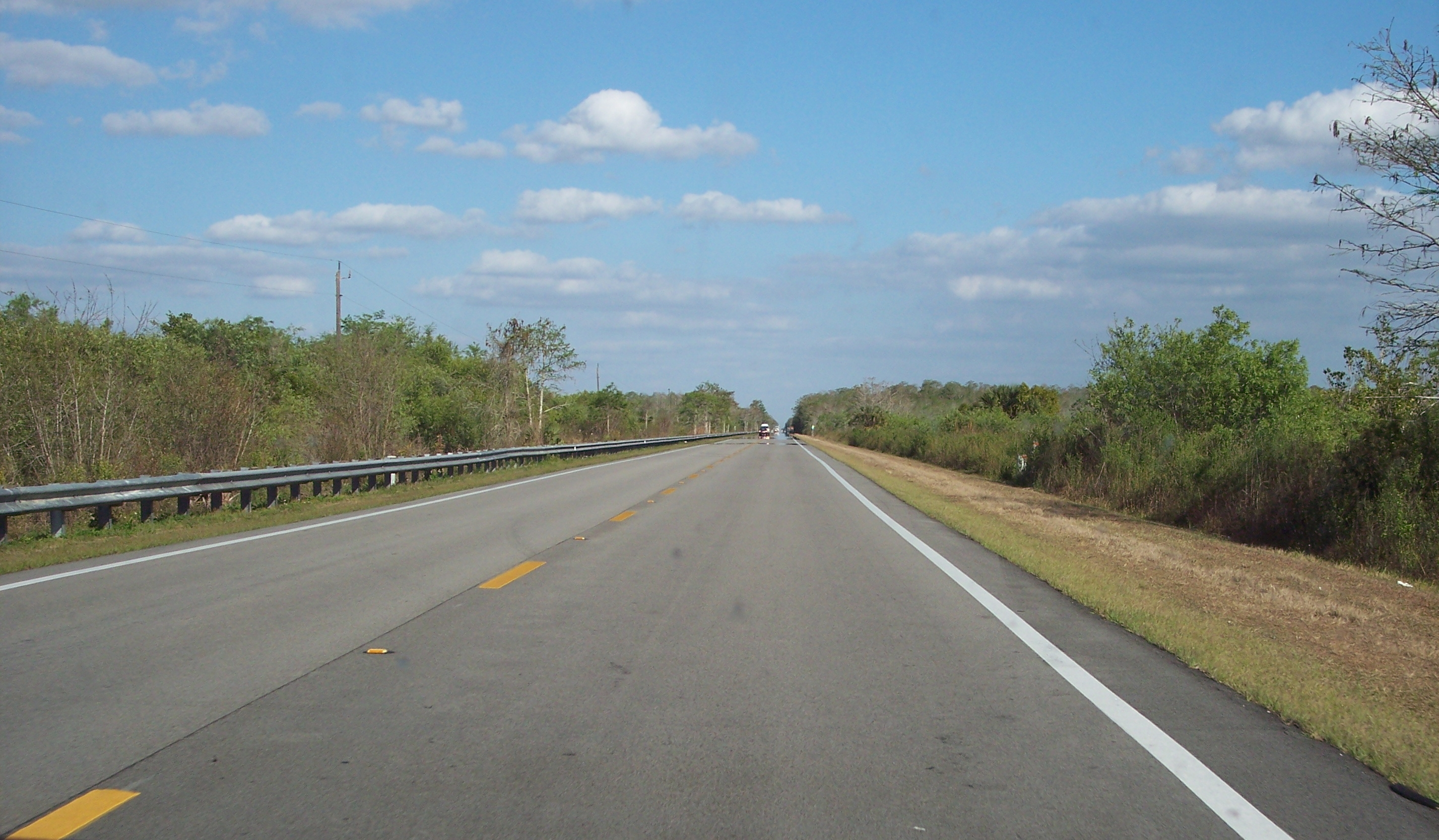
US 41 seen towards east in the Big Cypress National Preserve, a few miles north of the Everglades National Park

US 41, along with the Tamiami Trail designation, begins its northward journey at an intersection with US 1 in downtown Miami.

Between Miami and Naples, US 41 cuts across the Florida peninsula, running through the vast Everglades wilderness. This section has been designated a National Scenic Byway. The byway runs east–west through the Big Cypress National Preserve, skirting the northern border of the Everglades National Park for about 20 miles (32 km). The part of the highway between Tampa and Miami is known as Tamiami Trail (derived from the combination of Tampa and Miami, the road's two ends), thus, this section of the road is commonly known as the East Trail, as it runs east–west across this part of the state, in contrast to the road's otherwise distinctively north–south routing. Alligators are a common sight along the scenic Tamiami Trail from Miami to Naples. Unlike the parallel road, Alligator Alley, the trail is only one lane in each direction, and it has no fences to keep wildlife from crossing it.

In Naples, US 41 changes direction at the intersection of hidden SR 90 and hidden SR 45, turning from west to north towards Tampa, or from south to east towards Miami. This segment of US 41 is still considered Tamiami Trail. US 41 has a bypass in Fort Myers that separates from the trail, however in the Venice Area, US 41 breaks away from the trail onto hidden SR 45A, while US 41 Business uses the trail. A connector to I-75 can be found just north of the northern end of the business route.

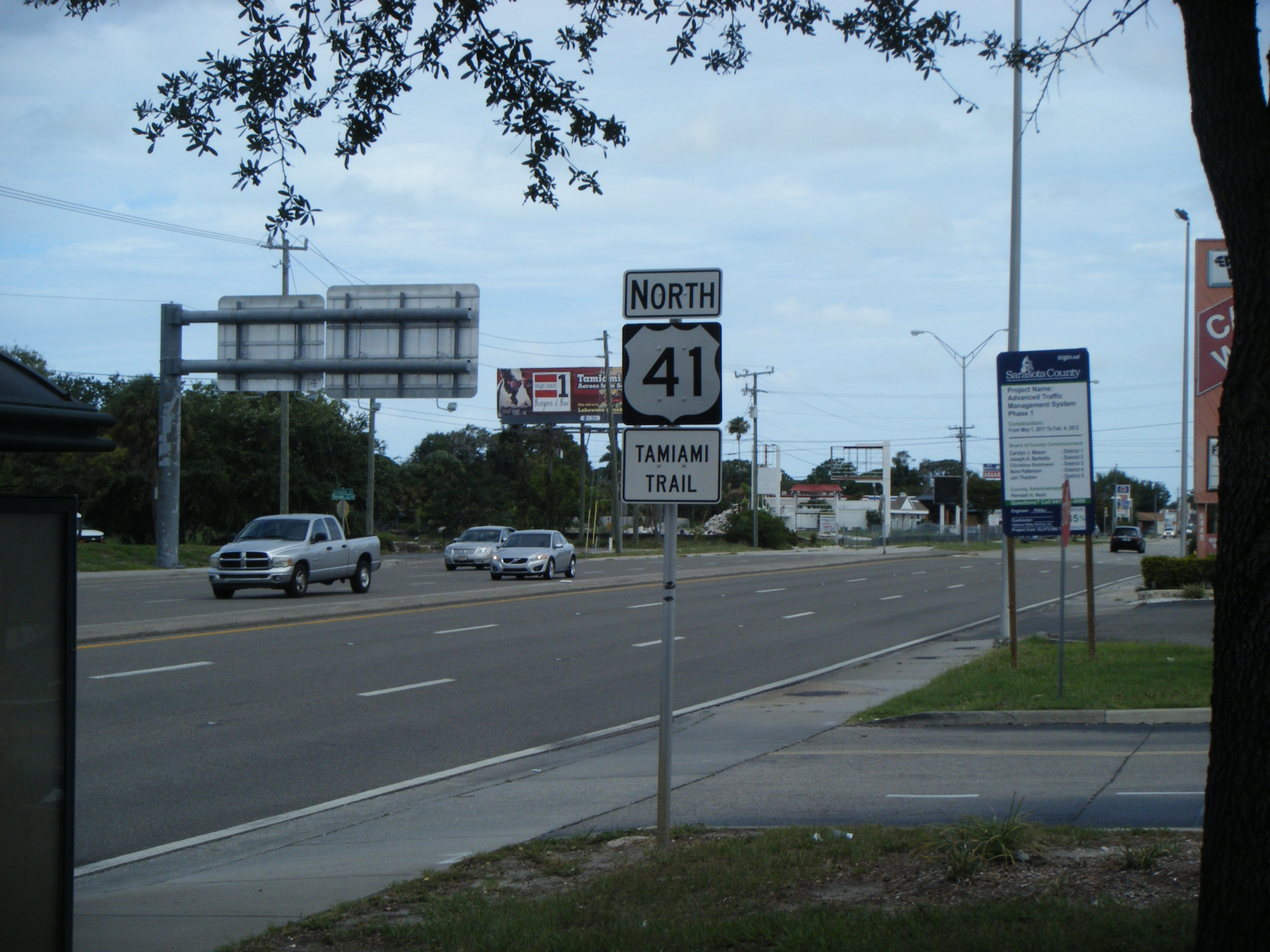
US 41 northbound past SR 72 in Gulf Gate Estates

Two major US highways terminate at US 41 in the Sarasota metropolitan area. The first is US 301 in Sarasota, which runs straight, while US 41 curves to the west towards the John Ringling Causeway, only to turn back north again. North of the western end of it CR 610, it runs along the western edge of Sarasota-Bradenton International Airport where it crosses the Sarasota-Manatee County line. Across from the airport, the road serves as the address for New College of Florida, and then the University of South Florida's Sarasota/Manatee Campus. In Bradenton, US 41 makes a sharp turn east onto SR 684 at the intersection of US 41 Business. The road curves north onto SR 55 and it encounters US 301 again, and shares a short concurrency with the road across the Manatee River. US 301 makes a sharp right turn onto SR 43 at a diamond interchange, while US 41 continues north. Just after the interchange with the northern end of US 41 Business in Memphis, another interchange exists with the southern end of US 301 exists. Here, US 41 rejoins hidden SR 45, while hidden SR 55 moves to US 19, where it will stay until it reaches Perry. The rest of US 41's journey will continue along the east coast of Tampa Bay.

=== Tampa to Lutz ===
From US 41 Business and SR 676 near the unincorporated Palm River-Clair Mel to US 92 in Tampa, US 41 carries the unsigned SR 599 designation. It contains the northwestern end of the Tamiami Trail at the SR 60 intersection. It is normally three lanes wide, but between I-4 and the northern end of SR 569 is only two lanes wide. The unsigned state highway is 5.6 miles (9.0 km) long. At the northern end, US 41 turns west. (If one continues straight, 40th Street leads to Busch Gardens Tampa Bay.) Major intersections include the Lee Roy Selmon Expressway (SR 618), SR 60, I-4, SR 583, SR 569, and SR 574. US 41 runs west along US 92 (Hillsborough Avenue) for several blocks, and upon doing so shares SR 600 as a hidden route. One other major intersection exists with SR 585, before running along the southern border of the Hampton Terrace Historic District where it turns north onto Nebraska Avenue(SR 45) just before approaching I-275 at Exit 47 A-B. Though not every signalized intersection along Nebraska Avenue provides access to I-275, many of them do. At first, the road runs through Old Seminole Heights where it remains along the border of the Hampton Terrace Historic District until the intersection of Hanna Avenue. The only other intersection that passes for a major street in the area is Sligh Avenue, which leads to Exit 48 on I-275 to the west. The road leaves Old Seminole Heights by crossing the 1923-built Nebraska Avenue Bridge over the Hillsborough River and enters Sulphur Springs, where one can find such sites as the Springs Theater on the corner of Sitka Street and on the opposite side, the former Tampa Greyhound Track between Bird Street and Waters Avenue. As the road is about to leave Sulphur Springs, a concrete median begins before US 41 crosses another at-grade railroad crossing along the south side of SR 580(Busch Boulevard). The rest of the way, it becomes the main north–south road through North Tampa, other than I-275.

West of the University of South Florida, US 41 intersects such major streets as State Road 582 (Fowler Avenue) and then several blocks north of there crosses SR 579/CR 582A (Fletcher Avenue). Further north, SR-CR 678 is the last chance for motorists to access I-275. After this, it curves to the northwest as it begins to run along the west side of the CSX Brooksville Subdivision, and both share an underpass with no access to I-275. Entering Lutz, the at-grade interchange with the northern end of BUS US 41(Hidden SR 685), is where US 41 becomes six lanes wide. Most intersections beyond this point are only of local importance. Nevertheless, US 41 crosses the Brooksville Subdivision at a sharply diagonal at-grade crossing, and both curve to the right, where they both run straight north through the rest of Lutz. From this point on, it runs along the east side of the Brooksville Subdivision, both of which run straight north throughout most of the community. Shortly after passing the historic Old Lutz Elementary School on the east side, it encounters a traffic signal with the eastern end of Lutz-Lake Fern Road (unmarked CR 582) on the west side. A replica of the former Lutz Seaboard Air Line Railroad Depot can be found on the northwest corner between the railroad tracks and the local library. The further north that US 41 runs, the more likely it runs into dead end streets and private roads, some of which are on the opposite side of the tracks. The road curves to the northwest before intersecting with County Line Road at the Hillsborough-Pasco County Line and enters Land o' Lakes, where it is named Land o' Lakes Boulevard throughout the county.

=== Pasco County ===
US 41 only remains in the northwest direction until it encounters the northern end of State Road 597 (Dale Mabry Highway) and after turning straight north passing by some naturist resorts, almost instantly intersects SR 54. Almost a mile (1.6 km) north of that point, the Brooksville Subdivision banks off to the northwest, while US 41 prepares to squeeze between some lakes for which the hamlet is named. North of County Road 583 (Ehren Cutoff) in the former community of Denham, the road narrows down to four lanes but remains divided as it curves to the northwest. Here, the road crosses the former right-of-way for a railroad line that ran between Tarpon Springs and Trilby until the mid-1970s. The road curves north again and then passes Land o' Lakes High School where it had only recently been widened. This newly widened section serves as the two gateways to the still under construction Connerton Conner development, and has been slated to become the future end of CR 524(Ridge Road Extension). Just after that, the gateway to the still under construction Tierra Del Sol development is where the division of the highway ends, although US 41 is still in the process of being widened throughout the northern Tampa Bay suburbs. Most of the surroundings beyond that point include dog sitting kennels, and run-down farms, although a road to the Pasco County Jail, with a fire station on the northeast corner stands out among the usual surroundings. After making another right curve and squeezing between two more small lakes, US 41 approaches a section of Land o' Lakes known as Gowers Corner, where the intersection of SR 52 can be found. Just east of Gowers Corner is the Pilot Country Airport, a local airport community.

Besides some random former motels and other businesses, most of the surroundings of this segment of the road consists of farmland, this time, much more active. Near a former lumber yard, US 41 crosses the Brooksville Subdivision again, and a local automotive and truck repair shop can be found on the northeast corner of that crossing. Continuing north, the road encounters sites such as the Detroit Resort Motel and shortly after this runs along the western edge of the Pasco Lake Estates community where it runs along a former section of the road known as Old Gainesville Highway and Pasco Lake Drive. An old narrow bridge across a dry creek can be found just north of this development. By the time the road reaches South Masaryktown the number of farm fields begin to diminish. A few small trailer parks, private homes and even some small businesses pop-up along the side of the road, but the farms don't completely move away from the road until after it crosses a narrow bridge over the Masaryktown Canal. Just north of the intersection of Bowman Road the west side of the road features a somewhat larger trailer park and private houses in front of a notably wide right-of-way for a future southbound lane. This right-of-way ends at Hernando-County Road 578, another County Line Road in Masaryktown, and US 41 becomes Broad Street.

=== Hernando County ===
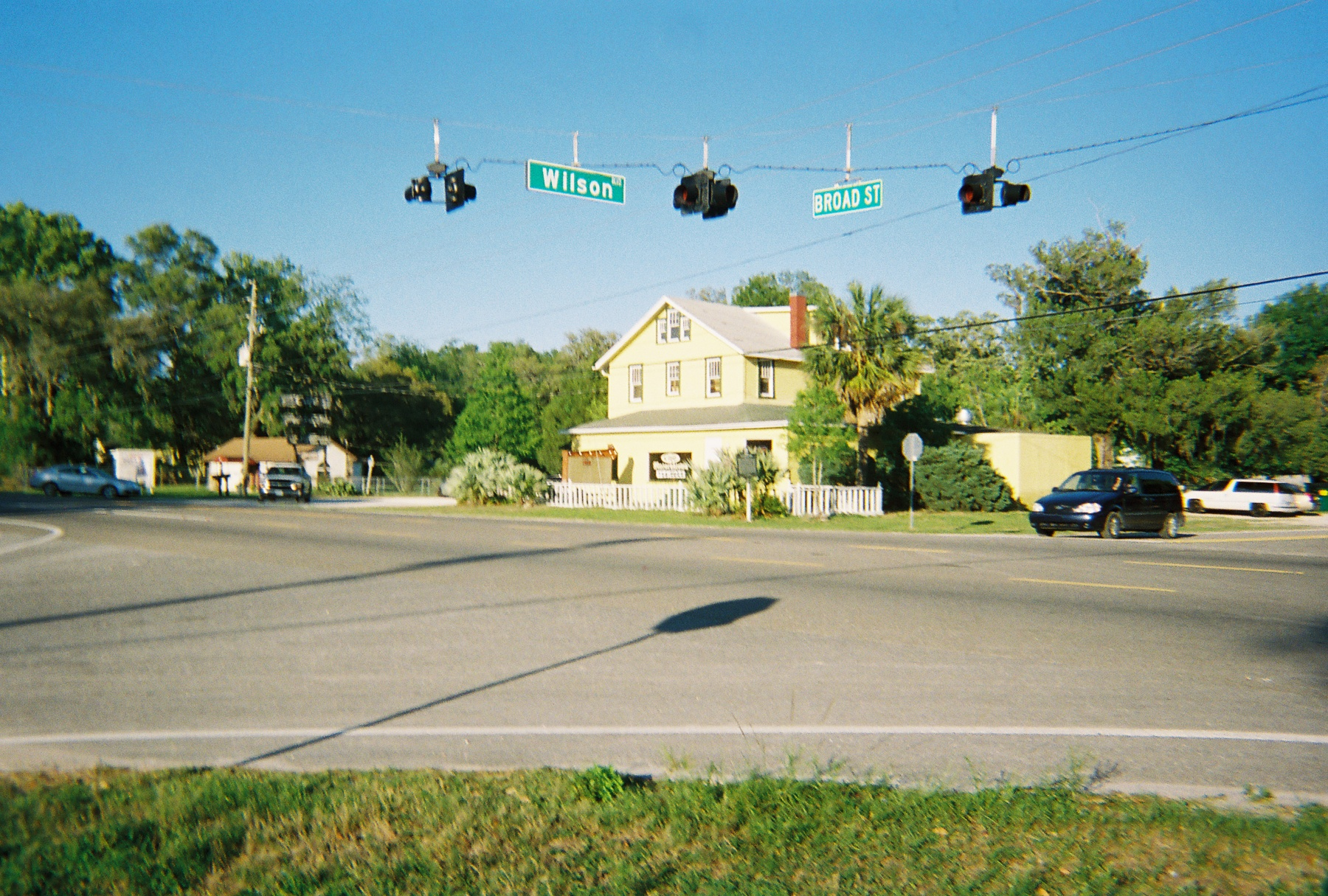
2009 Photo of US 41 and Wilson Boulevard in Masaryktown.

Within Masaryktown, US 41 remains two lanes wide and serves as the main road, which includes a few small private motels and a restaurant known as Cafe Masaryktown, at a blinker-light intersection. Before the intersection of County Road 576, the road widens to four lanes again, and then enters Garden Grove, where it serves as the eastern edge of Hernando County Airport. After the airport property ends, it intersects County Road 574(Spring Hill Boulevard), and then widens to six lanes nearly half way before approaching County Road 572(Powell Road). Near downtown Brooksville, US 41 intersects SR 50/US Truck Route 98, and secretly takes SR 700 with it. SR 700 is exposed further north as it branches off to the northwest near the former Brooksville Hospital site. US 41 then narrows down to two lanes, curves to the east and becomes a one-way street that's concurrent with southbound U.S. Route 98 and eastbound SR 50A. At the intersection of North Mildred Avenue, eastbound SR 50A, US 41, and US 98 are concurrent along Broad Street, while westbound SR 50A, US 41, and US 98 are concurrent along East Jefferson Avenue, then West Jefferson Avenue. This one-way configuration for Broad Street and Jefferson Street has been in effect since November 1993, according to the Florida Department of Transportation. While both segments go up and down steep hills in the heart of the city, the Broad Street (eastbound) section runs over an old railroad bridge built in 1936. The two intersections of Main Street(CR 445, former SR 45A) also contain the Hernando County Courthouse on the northeast corner of temporarily "eastbound" US 41/US 98/SR 50A," and the southeast corner of "westbound" US 41/98/SR 50A. After both segments drop into one last hill, US 98/SR 50A leaves US 41 at East Jefferson Street near May Avenue, and US 41 becomes a two-lane highway that drops down into yet another steep hill before curving north again where it intersects County Road 484 at a blinker-light intersection and climbs another one. It remains a two-lane highway through the rest of Hernando County. From this hill the road descends again as it runs between a trailer park on the northbound side, and a Brooksville school complex on the southbound side, both of which are on the southeast and southwest corners of CR 480(Croom Road) respectively. From there the road serves as the end of CR 445(Howell Avenue), but shortly afterwards becomes the southern end of Old Crystal River Road, which despite the name does not lead to Crystal River, assuming that it ever did. The rest of the route becomes more rural, as it runs towards some preserved land. Less private land can be found north of the southern end of CR 481 near Lake Lindsey. North of CR 476, US 41 runs through a portion of the Withlacoochee State Forest where it remains until it crosses the Hernando-Citrus County Line, and gets the name South Florida Avenue.

=== Citrus County through Marion County ===
Upon leaving the forest, the road remains almost as rural as it spends much of its time in Southern Citrus County as the same two-lane highway it was in northern Hernando County moving up and down various hills. As the road gets close to Downtown Floral City, it begins to run along the west side of the Withlacoochee State Trail, a former Atlantic Coast Line Railroad right-of-way that was converted into a rail trail shortly after being abandoned by CSX in 1987. The western end of County Road 48 is where US 41 also begins to include part of the DeSoto Trail. Meanwhile, the Withlacoochee State Trail continues to run along the east side of the road, often behind the backyards of local businesses and vacant lots. The only resemblance of a major intersection within this area is County Road 39A, a suffixed route of a former segment of State Road 39.

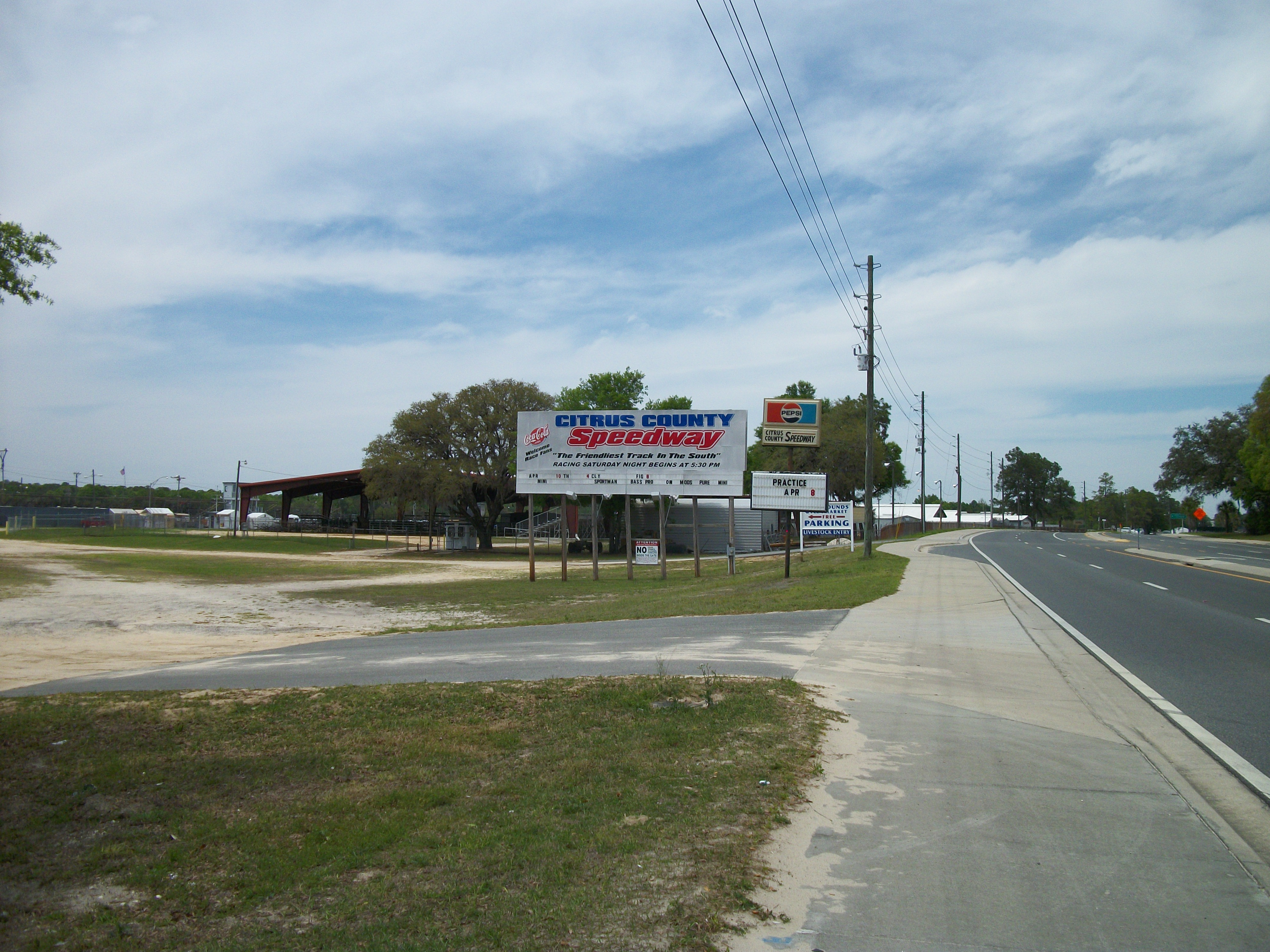
Sign for the Citrus County Speedway in Inverness Highlands South. Inverness Airport is nearby.

At some point, the road expands to a four-lane divided highway. The same types of local businesses continue to flank both roadsides until the road enters Inverness Highlands South where Citrus County Speedway and Inverness Airport can be seen on the west side. On the opposite side of these landmarks, Fort Cooper State Park is only accessible from the Withlacoochee State Trail, until the road enters the city limits of Inverness where it widens to six lanes. As the road climbs a slight grade and curves to the left, it approaches a concurrency with SR 44 which also includes a local divided highway named Highland Boulevard in this intersection. From there, US 41/SR 44 descends along a slight grade on the west coast of Cooter Lake, then winds around the Old Citrus County Courthouse and then Inverness Masonic Temple and at the intersection of Seminole Avenue suddenly turns straight west. The concurrency ends at a wye intersection west of Tallmadge Avenue, as SR 44 heads straight to Crystal River, while US 41 branches off to the northwest onto North Florida Avenue. The first intersection after this is Davidson Avenue, which is part of County Road 581. Later it dips towards a hotel at the intersection of Montgomery Avenue and curves to the right as it replacing the aforementioned road's alignment. The road runs along the eastern edge of Whispering Pines Park as it climbs another hill with a shopping center at the bottom of an embankment and descends again towards the entrance of the Inverness Middle School on the same side, and a small industrial park on the other side.

Just before leaving the Inverness city limits, the Withlacoochee State Trail crosses under US 41 and runs along the west side of the road. The trail can be seen again on the west side of the road just south of East Arlington Street near Inverness Highlands North, and remains along that side of the street, although the trail moves slightly further away north of East Van Ness Street. On the opposite side of the street, a former Seaboard Air Line Railroad right-of-way follows US 41, although it's no longer noticeable until further north. Nevertheless, US 41 and the trail still remain close enough to each other as they enter the City of Hernando. Here, the road serves as the eastern end of County Road 486, a short cut to Crystal River for southbound traffic. As the road approaches the shores of one of the Tsala Apopka Lakes, State Road 200 branches off to the northeast towards Ocala, Jacksonville, and Fernandina Beach while US 41 continues northwest. From here the road is slightly further away from the Withlacoochee State Trail, but that trail is still close enough to the road. In the meantime, the previously mentioned SAL line becomes more noticeable. The road curves to the north and descends along a hill into Holder, where it meets the only main intersection; County Road 491. From there the road curves back northwest again, and runs through Citrus Springs

The first intersection of Citrus Springs Boulevard is not the last place where Withlacoochee State Trail. and the former SAL line can be found on both sides, but it is the last place where a trailhead can be found in close proximity to the road. North of there the area has more pine trees, but both trails can still be seen on each side. Dead end streets for housing developments that were never built can be seen across the former railroad tracks. The Withlacoochee State trail moves away from US 41 for the last time just south of the second intersection with Citrus Springs Boulevard, which is the gateway to Citrus Springs. US 41 becomes wide enough for turn lanes on both sides and has a traffic signals that the previous intersection lacked. North of here, the former SAL ROW is still in sight, even though the area remains wooded for the most part, although there's some slight clearing as it curves straight north. Deep within another unfinished development on the west side of the road, the trail ends, but part of the name is encountered again at the western end of County Road 39(Withlacoochee Trail), a former segment of State Road 39, which now terminates all the way down in eastern Pasco County. The road curves northwest one last time as it prepares to leave Citrus County, passing by some small industrial lots and a local youth athletic park.

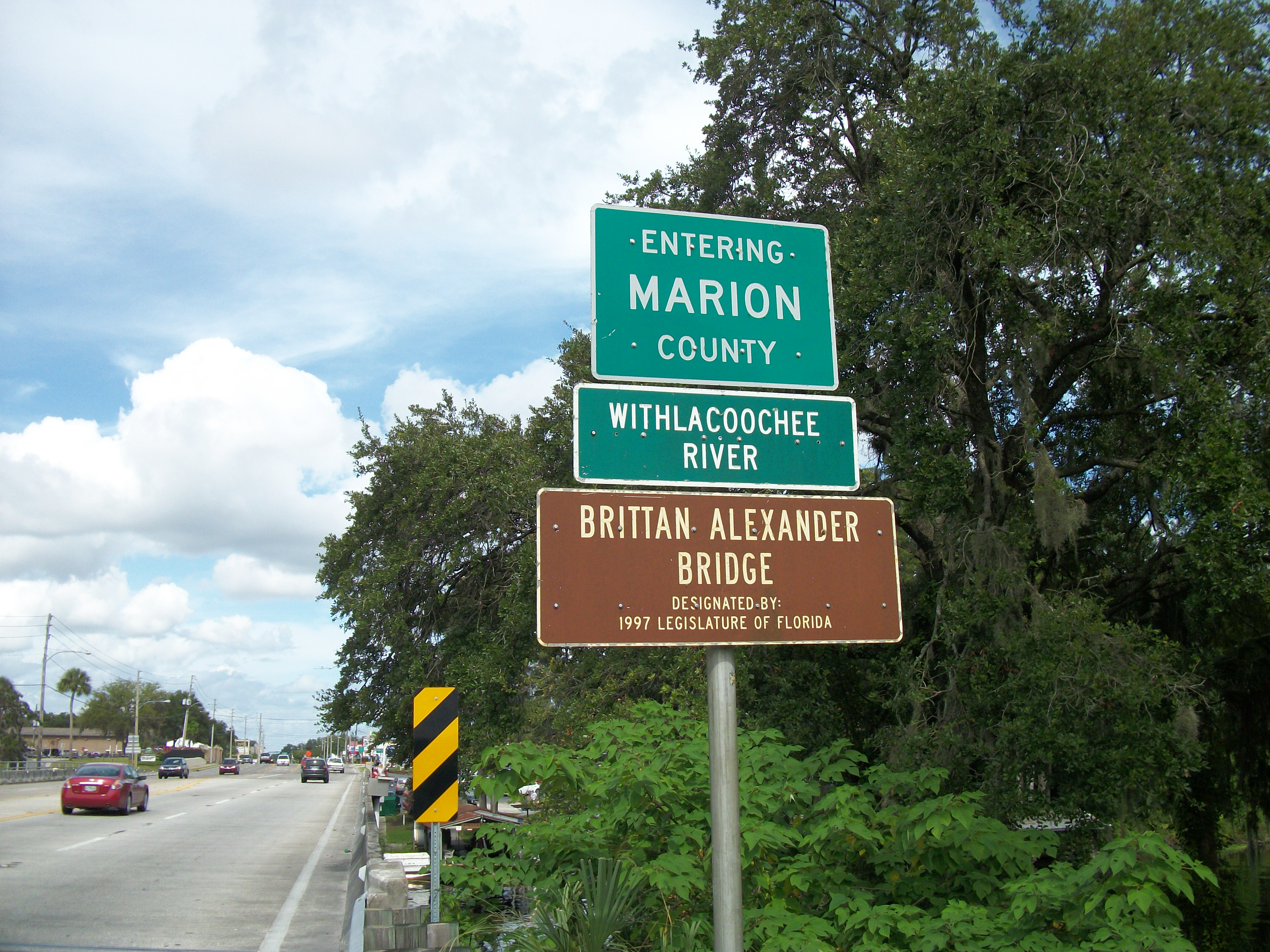
US 41 approaches the Brittan Alexander Bridge over the Withlacoochee River and enters Marion County.

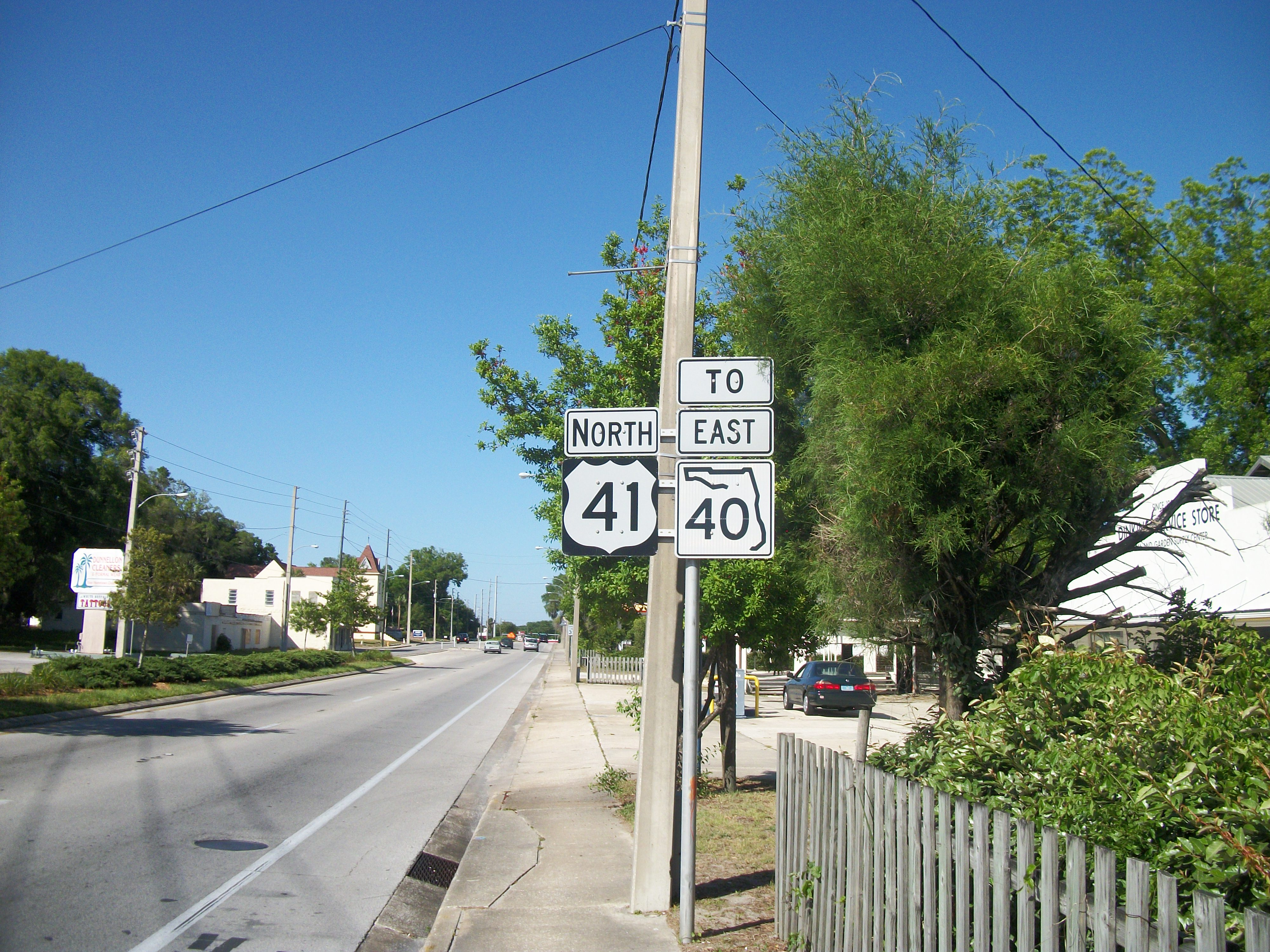
US 41 northbound in Dunnellon

After climbing an embankment for a bridge over the Florida Northern Railroad line to the Crystal River 3 Nuclear Power Plant, US 41 intersects County Road 488 then curves northeast as it approaches the Brittan Alexander Bridge over the Withlacoochee River to enter Dunnellon and turns into Williams Street. The north end of the bridge contains City Hall and a city-run boat ramp on the northwest side, and a motel/restaurant/canoe & kayak dock on the northeast side. Almost immediately, US 41 enters the Dunnellon Boomtown Historic District, which is listed on the National Register of Historic Places and includes a former Atlantic Coast Line Railroad depot that served the line now used for the previously mentioned nuclear power plant in Crystal River. Within the same district just north of the station is the intersection of Pennsylvania Avenue, which is County Roads 40/336 to the west and County Road 484 to the east. From here, US 41 also serves as a not-so hidden concurrency with State Road 40.

North of the city US 41/SR 40 enters Chatmar, then Rainbow Falls, and then Rainbow Lakes Estates, which is where the Headsprings Entrance to Rainbow Springs State Park can be found. Just north of that point, SR 40 breaks away to the northeast on its way to Ocala, Silver Springs, and Ormond Beach while US 41 continues north on its own. The last intersection of any importance is County Road 328 in Romeo, before the road crosses over into Levy County.

=== Levy County through Alachua County ===
Just as with many state and county roads in Levy County, US 41 runs along numerous farm fields interrupted by wooded areas, and intersects with many dirt and other rural roads. These roads include County Road 545 along the border, County Road 464, which becomes a suffixed alternate of State Road 464 in Marion County, and in Morriston, County Road 326, a bi-county extension of State Road 326. The road begins to curve straight north before entering the city of Williston, where the rural surroundings continue. Without the city limits sign though, drivers would find it difficult to believe they're in Williston until the road approaches the entrance to the Williston Municipal Airport. Beyond the airport, State Road 121 joins US 41 at an intersection shared by CR 316, which previously overlapped SR 121 from the southwest. The rural surroundings of southern Levy County don't start to diminish until the intersection of Southwest Seventh Avenue. Right after Southwest First Avenue, a wide turning ramp at an intersection takes northbound US 41/SR 121 drivers onto US Alt 27(SR 500), and shares a brief concurrency in the city until US Alt 27 terminates at US 27. SR 500 continues southeast as hidden routes of US 27 and other U.S. Routes as it heads towards Ocala, Orlando, Kissimmee, and Indiatlantic, while US 41, and SR 121 turn north along US 27. Shortly after the merger of US 27 and 41, SR 121 breaks away to the northeast and takes the DeSoto Trail with it.

The US 27/41 concurrency remains only two lanes wide, and it begins to lean to the northwest until briefly shifting straight north before approaching Archer, where it intersects CR 346, then a former Florida Railway and Navigation Company right-of-way, and finally State Road 24. After SR 24, US 27/41 curves back northwest but head straight northward through State Road 26 in Newberry and both remain as such until US 41 reach High Springs, where US 27 makes a left turn onto State Road 20 towards Perry, Tallahassee, and Havana, while US 41 briefly becomes independent before it joins US 441 towards Lake City and points north. The intersection of US 441 serves as the northern end of its hidden State Road 45, and the southern end of CR 236, and the road is reunited with the DeSoto Trail where it will remain until it reaches Lake City.

=== Columbia County ===
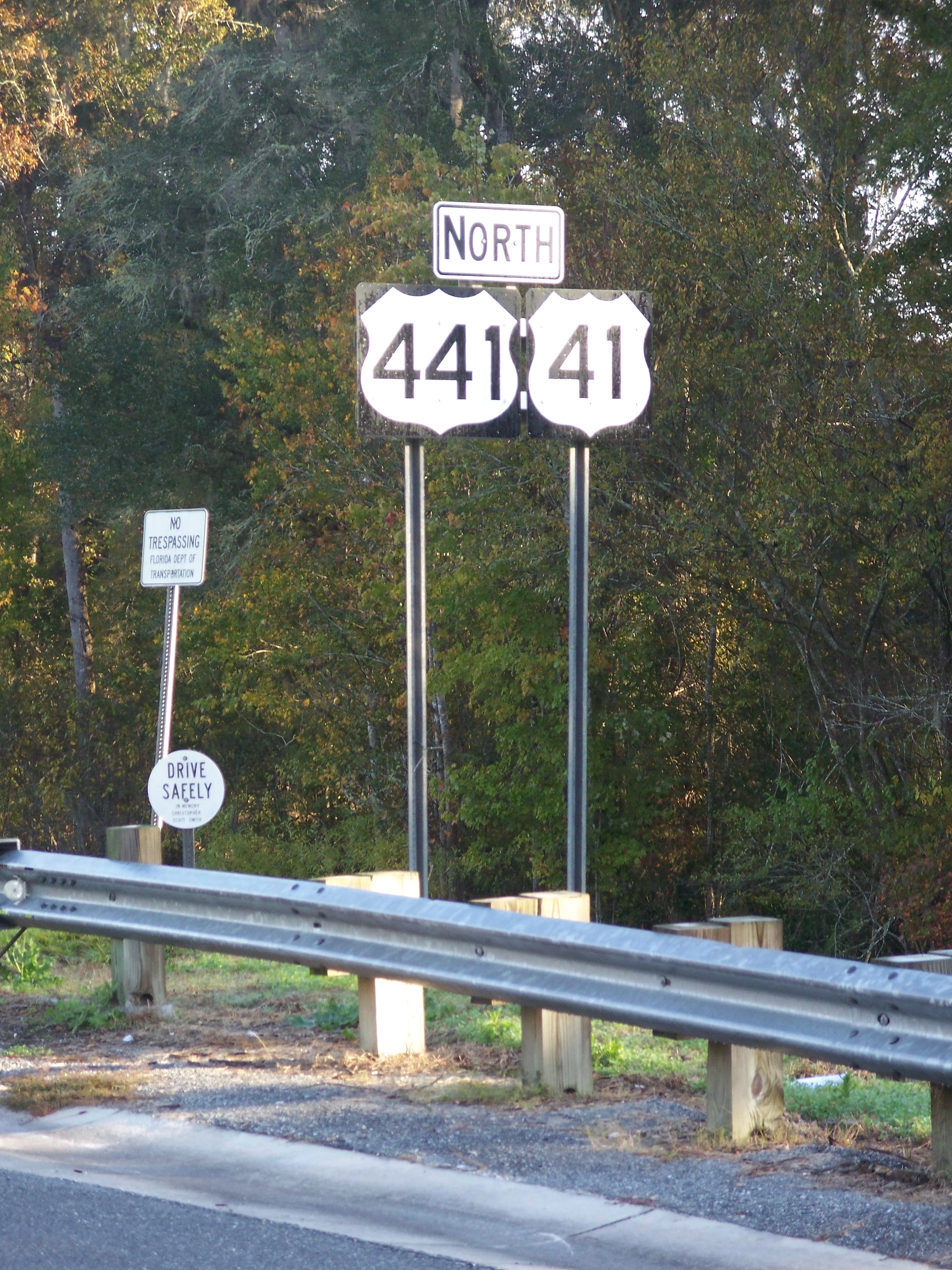
Signs for the northbound US 41/441 overlap as it approaches the Santa Fe River bridge.

US 41/441 crosses the Santa Fe River then runs north passing by O'Leno State Park and River Rise Preserve State Park, near which it shares a brief concurrency with a county extension of State Road 18. It then runs through Ellsville, where it has another interchange with I-75 (Exit 414), just south of the western end of State Road 238.

Approaching Lake City, US 441 splits from US 41 onto State Road 25A south of the city. The routes remain parallel, and at some point Route 41 is joined by State Road 47 which was signed as terminating at US 41. However, this concurrency only lasts until the intersection of State Road 10A, where SR 47 turns east for a block before joining US 441. The next block is U.S. Route 90, where the DeSoto Trail heads west, and State Road 100 joins US 41 to the northern extent of Lake City.

Before leaving Lake City's limits, US 41 curves to the northwest to run parallel to a Georgia Southern and Florida Railway line. Since it also carries two hidden state roads at this point, it serves as the end for suffixed alternates of both routes, albeit Columbia County suffixed alternates. The first is County Road 100A (Northwest Bascom Norris Drive), and much further north, outside of the city at County Road 25A (Northwest Valdosta Road), which is a county extension of State Road 25A. Due to the parallel railroad line along the east side, the interchange with Interstate 10 at exit 301 is a pair of quarter-cloverleaf ramps on the southwest and northwest corners of the underpass. Construction of the interchange itself forced the relocation of CR 131(Northwest Falling Creek Road), which terminates at US 41 just north of the aforementioned interchange. Slightly further north, the road serves as the address for WCJX (106.5 FM). From here it runs through small towns such as Winfield and Suwannee Valley. The last notable intersection in Columbia County is CR 246 (Lassie Black Road).

=== Hamilton County to the Georgia State Line ===
Crossing the Ed Scott Bridge over the Suwannee River into Hamilton County, Florida US 41 enters White Springs, Florida, where it breaks away from the GSF railroad line and turns west onto Spring Street. Here the road serves as the southern end of CR 135, and while running through the White Springs Historic District serves as the eastern end of State Road 136, before turning straight north again into Roberts Street, and running along the western edge of the city. The last suffixed route of hidden SR 25 can be found on Camp Street as CR 25A, but that route does not reunite with its parent road. As it leaves the city it returns to the same side of the GSF railroad line it was at earlier, both of which will run through the unincorporated community of Facil where it encounters the southern end of CR 137. Northwest of there, it runs through Occidental, and then Genoa where it serves as the eastern end of CR 132. Beyond that, it runs through a strip mining area where the only other community is Camps Still, however after passing through Hillcoat, which is where the northern end of CR 137 can be found, US 41 joins US 129 as well as hidden SR 51. The newly overlapped routes briefly run straight north before making a reverse curve around the left side of Roberts Pond and Shaky Pond before entering the City of Jasper. US 41/129/SR 100 turns west onto State Road 6(Hatley Street), which becomes County Road 6 east of the intersection, while hidden SR 51 becomes County Road 51(Second Avenue Northeast) north of the same intersection.

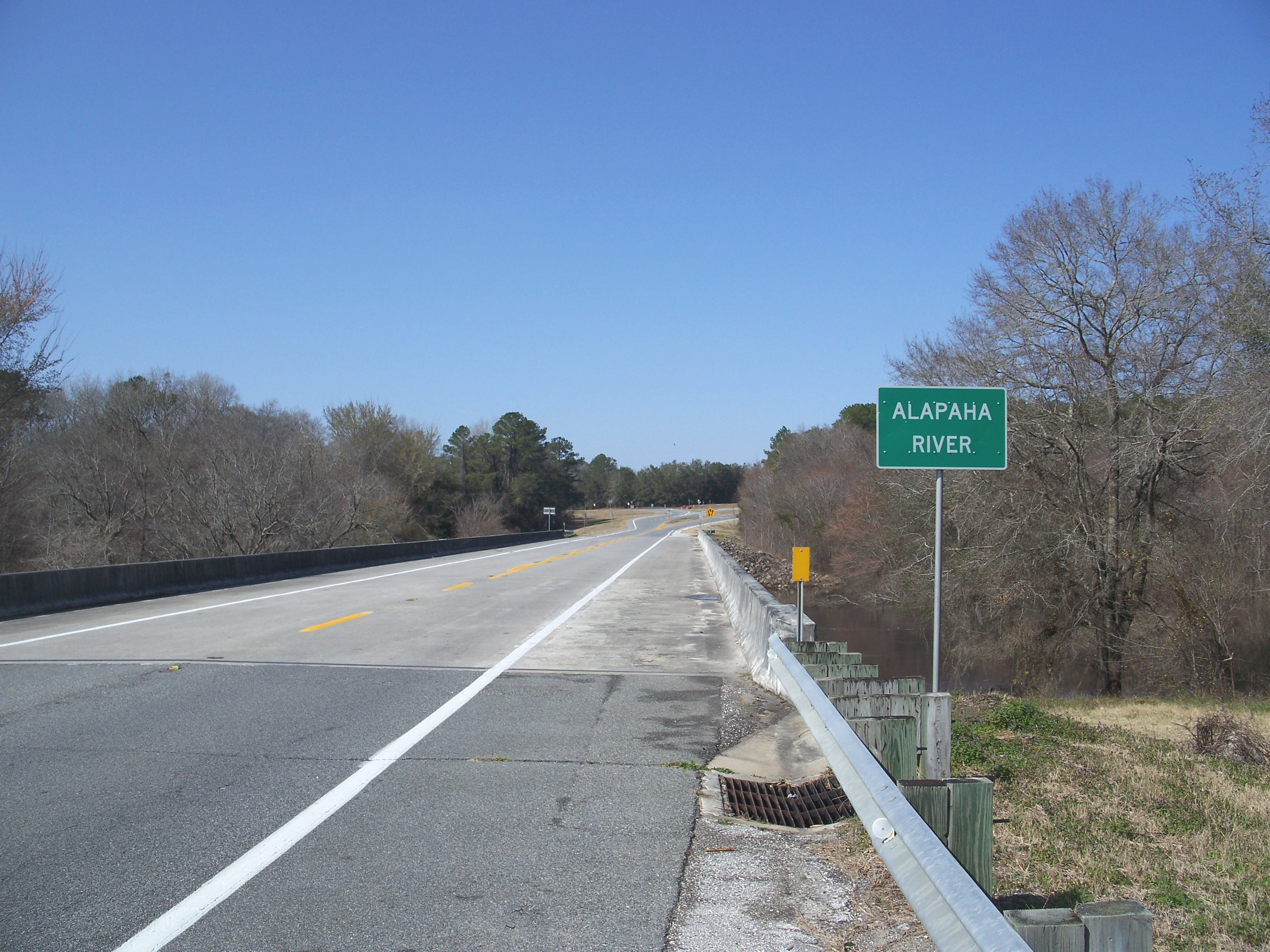
Northbound US 41 and westbound SR 6 before crossing the Alapaha River.

After Fifth Avenue, the road begins to curve to the northwest, and by 15th Avenue, the concurrency with US 129 ends as the road moves towards more of a northwest angle, taking hidden SR 100 with it. SR 6 and US 41 return straight west as it leaves the city until CR 148 (Northwest 86th Boulevard), where they begin to curve northwest again. Shortly after this curve, as well as another bridge over the Alapaha River, the concurrency with SR 6 ends. SR 6 heads southwest toward I-75 and Madison, while US 41 curves more toward the northwest. The only other intersection north of that point seems to be CR 152, although further north in Jennings, the road briefly overlaps CR 141, but that overlap ends at the eastern end of State Road 143 whose intersection is shared by CR 141. The rest of the way, US 41 serves as part of the border of Jennings, the northernmost community along the route in the state. Northwest Ninth Street and Oak Street are officially the last intersections with US 41 in the state before the road crosses the Georgia State Line, terminating hidden SR 25, and replacing it with Georgia State Route 7.

== History ==
U.S. Highway 94
- Location: Naples–Miami
- Existed: 1926–1949

US 41 was first designated in 1926 upon the creation of the United States Numbered Highway System running from Florida to Copper Harbor, Michigan. When first designated, US 41's southern terminus was in Naples. The route south of Tampa was also known as the Tamiami Trail. The current route of US 41 south and east of Naples to Miami (which was also part of the Tamiami Trail) was originally designated as U.S. Route 94.

=== Early changes ===
Changes began being made to the route of US 41 as early as the 1930s. In Southwest Florida, US 41 was shifted slightly to new river crossings with the opening of the original Barron Collier Bridge over the Peace River in Punta Gorda and the original Edison Bridge over the Caloosahatchee River in Fort Myers, both of which opened in 1931. Both bridges replaced pre-existing narrow bridges that and were intended to be temporary.

In the mid 1930s, US 41 was rerouted from to bypass Englewood in southern Sarasota County. The road previously ran south from South Venice to Englewood along Englewood Road (present-day SR 776) and Old Englewood Road. It then ran east along Dearborn Street, River Road, and Playmore Road where it reconnected to the current US 41 just east of the Myakka River near North Port.

In 1937, US 41 was rerouted to its current route between Dunnellon and High Springs. The previous route ran further east and passed through Ocala and Gainesville. The previous route between Ocala and High Springs was then redesignated as an extension of US 441.

=== Extension to Miami ===
In 1949, US 41 was extended from Naples southeast to Miami, making the entire Tamiami Trail part of US 41 as it is today. The extension of US 41 replaced US 94, a designation which was then decommissioned. By 1952, US 41 was extended further to Miami Beach via the MacArthur Causeway. As of 2000, US 41's southern terminus was restored to US 1 in Miami as it is today.

=== Later years ===
The alignment of US 41 between Tampa and Palmetto was changed in the 1950s. The original alignment ran further inland through Riverview and Parrish. The route was realigned to its current route through Ruskin and Apollo Beach in 1951, which had previously been designated US 541. The original inland alignment was then redesignated as an extension of US 301.

Historical US 41 route markers

1926 design

1948 design

1956–1993, orange highway shields

From 1956 until 1993, US 41 signs in Florida featured white numbering on an orange shield. The "color-coding" of U.S. Highways by FDOT was stopped when the state could no longer use federal funds to replace the signs with anything but the standard black-and-white version.

In 1957, both US 41 and US 301 were rerouted to the newly built Hernando Desoto Bridge over the Manatee River between Bradenton and Palmetto. The previous route, which crossed the river on the original Green Bridge, then became US 41 Business.

In 1959, US 41 was rerouted along the newly-built Bayfront Drive in Downtown Sarasota. It previously ran through Downtown Sarasota along North Palm Avenue, Main Street, and Washington Boulevard.

In 1964, US 41 was realigned in downtown Fort Myers and North Fort Myers with the opening the Caloosahatchee Bridge over the Caloosahatchee River. The original route, which ran through downtown Fort Myers and crossed the river on the original Edison Bridge, was then redesignated as US 41 Business. Though some of the original route within downtown has been relinquished to city control.

In 1966, US 41 was realigned to its current route in Venice. The previous route west of the Intracoastal Waterway was then redesignated as US 41 Business.

In 1976, US 41 was rerouted to bypass Bonita Springs in southern Lee County. The original route through downtown Bonita Springs, now known as Old 41 Road, was initially redesignated as SR 887 but it has since been relinquished to county and city control.

== Major intersections ==
| County | Location | mi | km | Destinations | Notes |
|---|---|---|---|---|---|
| Miami-Dade | Miami | 0.000 | 0.000 | Brickell Avenue | Former US 1 / SR 5 |
| Miami-Dade | Miami | 0.62 | 1.00 | I-95 (US 1 / SR 5 / SR 9A) – Downtown Miami | I-95 exit 1B |
| Miami-Dade | Miami | 1.066 | 1.716 | US 441 north (Southwest 8th Avenue / SR 7) | Southern terminus of US 441 |
| Miami-Dade | Miami | 1.504 | 2.420 | SR 933 (Southwest 12th Avenue) | |
| Miami-Dade | Miami | 3.041 | 4.894 | SR 9 (Southwest 27th Avenue) | |
| Miami-Dade | Miami | 4.568 | 7.351 | SR 953 (Southwest 42nd Avenue / Le Jeune Road) – Airport | |
| Miami-Dade | Miami–Coral Gables– West Miami tripoint | 6.103 | 9.822 | SR 959 (Southwest 57th Avenue / Red Road) | |
| Miami-Dade | Miami–Coral Terrace– Fontainebleau–Westchester quadripoint | 8.16 | 13.13 | SR 826 (Palmetto Expressway) – Airport | Interchange |
| Miami-Dade | Fontainebleau–Westchester line | 9.119 | 14.676 | SR 973 (Galloway Road / Southwest 87th Avenue) | |
| Miami-Dade | Sweetwater–Westchester line | 11.130 | 17.912 | SR 985 (Avenue of the Americas / Southwest 107th Avenue) | |
| Miami-Dade | Sweetwater–Westchester– Tamiami tripoint | 12.19 | 19.62 | Florida's Turnpike Extension (SR 821) – Homestead, Orlando, Airport, Downtown Miami | Turnpike exit 25 |
| Miami-Dade | Tamiami | 14.165 | 22.796 | SR 825 north (Southwest 137th Avenue) | |
| Miami-Dade | | 18.175 | 29.250 | SR 997 (Krome Avenue / Southwest 177th Avenue) – South Bay, Homestead | |
| Miami-Dade | Fortymile Bend | 39.725 | 63.931 | Loop Road | |
| Collier | Monroe Station | 59.231 | 95.323 | Loop Road | |
| Collier | | 69.522 | 111.885 | CR 839 north (Turner River Road) – H.P. Williams Picnic Area | |
| Collier | Ochopee | 72.733 | 117.052 | CR 841 north (Birdon Road) | |
| Collier | Carnestown | 76.198 | 122.629 | SR 29 north / CR 29 south to I-75 – Everglades City, Chokoloskee, Immokalee, Airport, Smallwood Store | |
| Collier | Royal Palm Hammock | 91.923 | 147.936 | CR 92 west (San Marco Road) – Marco Island, Goodland | |
| Collier | | 100.085 | 161.071 | SR 951 south / CR 951 north (Collier Boulevard) to I-75 – Isles of Capri, Marco Island | |
| Collier | | 104.515 | 168.201 | CR 864 (Rattlesnake Hammock Road / Thomasson Drive) – Naples Botanical Garden | |
| Collier | | 106.202 | 170.916 | CR 31 north (Airport-Pulling Road) – Airport | |
| Collier | Naples | 107.490 | 172.988 | SR 84 east (Davis Boulevard) to I-75 – Fort Lauderdale, Miami | |
| Collier | Naples | 108.039 | 173.872 | CR 851 north (Goodlette-Frank Road) – Naples Zoo | |
| Collier | Naples | 108.285 | 174.268 | 5th Avenue South – Downtown Naples; 9th Street South – Historic District | Western end of SR 90 concurrency; southern end of SR 45 concurrency |
| Collier | Naples | 110.392 | 177.659 | CR 886 east (Golden Gate Parkway) to I-75 – Airport | |
| Collier | Naples | 113.093 | 182.006 | CR 896 east (Pine Ridge Road) to I-75 – Airport | |
| Collier | | 115.796 | 186.356 | CR 862 (Vanderbilt Beach Road) | |
| Collier | | 117.308 | 188.789 | CR 846 (Immokalee Road / 111th Avenue North) to I-75 | |
| Collier | | 118.827 | 191.234 | CR 888 west (Wiggins Pass Road) | |
| Collier | | 119.050 | 191.592 | CR 887 north (Old US 41) – Everglades Wonder Gardens | |
| Lee | Bonita Springs | 121.339 | 195.276 | CR 865 (Bonita Beach Road) to I-75 – Fort Myers Beach, Dog Track | |
| Lee | Bonita Springs | 124.769 | 200.796 | Old 41 Road (CR 887 south) – Everglades Wonder Gardens, Bonita Springs Business District | |
| Lee | Estero | 128.278 | 206.443 | CR 850 east (Corkscrew Road) to I-75 | |
| Lee | | 133.007 | 214.054 | SR 739 north (Michael G. Rippe Parkway) | |
| Lee | | 133.477 | 214.810 | To I-75 / Alico Road (CR 840 east) – Southwest Florida International Airport | |
| Lee | | 136.129 | 219.078 | SR 865 north (Ben C. Pratt Six Mile Cypress Parkway) / CR 865 south (Gladiolus Drive) – Beaches | |
| Lee | | 137.389 | 221.106 | To I-75 / Cypress Lake Drive / Daniels Parkway (CR 876) – Barbara B. Mann Performing Arts Center, Southwest Florida International Airport | |
| Lee | | 138.095 | 222.242 | College Parkway – Cape Coral, Edison State College | To Cape Coral Bridge |
| Lee | Fort Myers | 139.899 | 225.146 | To I-75 / Boy Scout Drive / Fowler Street – Fort Myers Beach, Sanibel, Captiva | |
| Lee | Fort Myers | 140.87 | 226.71 | SR 884 east / CR 884 west (Colonial Boulevard) to I-75 – Cape Coral, Fort Myers Beach, Sanibel, Lehigh Acres | Interchange |
| Lee | Fort Myers | 143.888 | 231.565 | To SR 867 / McGregor Boulevard – Edison Estate | Interchange northbound and intersection southbound; southbound exit and northbound entrance |
| Lee | Fort Myers | 144.0 | 231.7 | US 41 Bus. north / SR 80 east / SR 82 east (Martin Luther King Jr. Boulevard) – Harborside, Historic District, Downtown Fort Myers | Interchange |
| Lee | Fort Myers | 144.5 | 232.6 | Caloosahatchee Bridge over Caloosahatchee River | |
| Lee | North Fort Myers | 146.005 | 234.972 | CR 78A (Pondella Road) – Cape Coral, North Fort Myers | |
| Lee | North Fort Myers | 147.272 | 237.011 | SR 78 (Pine Island Road) to I-75 – Cape Coral, Pine Island | |
| Lee | North Fort Myers | 149.390 | 240.420 | US 41 Bus. south (SR 739) | |
| Lee | Cape Coral | 150.315 | 241.909 | Del Prado Boulevard – Cape Coral | |
| Charlotte | Tropical Gulf Acres | 160.703 | 258.626 | To I-75 / Tuckers Grade (CR 762 east) | |
| Charlotte | Punta Gorda | 162.273 | 261.153 | CR 765A north (Taylor Road) – Edison State College | |
| Charlotte | Punta Gorda | 163.874 | 263.730 | CR 765 (Burnt Store Road / North Jones Loop Road) to I-75 – Airport | |
| Charlotte | Punta Gorda | 167.456 | 269.494 | US 17 north (Olympia Avenue / SR 35) – Arcadia | Southern terminus of US 17 |
| Charlotte | | 168.3 | 270.9 | Barron Collier Bridge / Gilchrist Bridge over Peace River | |
| Charlotte | Charlotte Harbor | 168.985 | 271.955 | CR 776A north (Melbourne Street) | |
| Charlotte | Charlotte Harbor | 169.719 | 273.136 | Kings Highway (CR 769 north) | |
| Charlotte | Charlotte Harbor | 170.004 | 273.595 | To I-95 / Harborview Road (CR 776 east) / Edgewater Drive | |
| Charlotte | Murdock | 175.589 | 282.583 | SR 776 west (El Jobean Road) to I-75 / Veterans Boulevard – Charlotte Sports Park, El Jobean, Englewood | |
| Charlotte | | 176.771 | 284.485 | To I-75 / Toledo Blade Boulevard – Charlotte Sports Park | |
| Sarasota | North Port | 180.610 | 290.664 | To I-75 / Sumter Boulevard (CR 771) | |
| Sarasota | | 185.774 | 298.974 | SR 777 to I-75 / River Road – Myakka State Forest, Englewood | |
| Sarasota | | 191.923 | 308.870 | To I-75 / Jacaranda Boulevard (CR 765) – Englewood | |
| Sarasota | | 192.462 | 309.738 | SR 776 south (Englewood Road) – Englewood | |
| Sarasota | | 194.518 | 313.046 | US 41 Bus. north (Tamiami Trail) | Northern end of SR 45 concurrency; south end of SR 45A concurrency |
| Sarasota | Venice | 196.423 | 316.112 | CR 772 east (Venice Avenue) to I-75 – Venice Beach | |
| Sarasota | Venice | 197.486 | 317.823 | US 41 Bus. south (Tamiami Trail) – Venice | Northern end of SR 45A concurrency; southern end of SR 45 concurrency |
| Sarasota | Nokomis | 198.692 | 319.764 | Albee Road (CR 789 north) – Casey Key, Nokomis Beach | |
| Sarasota | Nokomis | 199.701 | 321.388 | To I-75 / Laurel Road (CR 762) | |
| Sarasota | Nokomis | 200.523 | 322.710 | SR 681 north to I-75 north – Tampa | Interchange |
| Sarasota | Osprey | 202.941 | 326.602 | Blackburn Point Road (CR 789 south) | |
| Sarasota | | 206.836 | 332.870 | Beneva Road (CR 773 north) | |
| Sarasota | | 209.273 | 336.792 | SR 72 (Stickney Point Road) to I-75 – Myakka State Park, Arcadia, Gulf Beaches, Siesta Key | |
| Sarasota | | 211.106 | 339.742 | Proctor Road (CR 72A east) | |
| Sarasota | Sarasota | 212.086 | 341.319 | SR 758 (Bay Road / Bee Ridge Road) to I-75 – Siesta Key, Beaches | |
| Sarasota | Sarasota | 214.196 | 344.715 | US 301 north (Washington Boulevard / SR 683) – Bradenton | No left turn southbound; southern terminus of US 301 |
| Sarasota | Sarasota | 215.449 | 346.732 | SR 789 north (Gulf Stream) – St. Armands Key, Longboat Key, Beaches, Mote Aquarium | |
| Sarasota | Sarasota | 215.660 | 347.071 | To I-75 / SR 780 / Fruitville Road – Downtown Historic District | |
| Sarasota | Sarasota | 218.686 | 351.941 | To I-75 / University Parkway (CR 610 east) / Ringling Plaza – Sarasota-Bradenton International Airport, Ringling Museum, Asolo Theatre, Dog Track | |
| Manatee | | 223.474 | 359.647 | SR 70 east (53rd Avenue West) to I-75 – Manatee Technical Institute | |
| Manatee | | 224.481 | 361.267 | US 41 Bus. north (14th Street West / SR 45) – Palmetto SR 684 west (Cortez Road) – Beaches | Northern end of SR 45 concurrency; southern end of SR 684 concurrency |
| Manatee | | 225.226 | 362.466 | 44th Avenue Connection | Northern end of SR 684 concurrency; southern end of SR 55 concurrency |
| Manatee | Bradenton | 226.871 | 365.113 | US 301 south (SR 683) | Southern end of US 301 concurrency; interchange; southbound exit and northbound entrance |
| Manatee | Bradenton | 227.375 | 365.925 | SR 64 east (6th Avenue) to I-75 – Zolfo Springs | |
| Manatee | Bradenton | 227.465 | 366.069 | SR 64 west (Manatee Avenue) – Anna Maria Island, Beaches | |
| Manatee | | | | Hernando Desoto Bridge over the Manatee River | |
| Manatee | Palmetto | 229.26 | 368.96 | US 301 north (SR 43) to I-75 – Ellenton | Northern end of US 301 concurrency; interchange |
| Manatee | Palmetto | 230.923 | 371.635 | US 41 Bus. south (SR 45) – Palmetto | Southern end of SR 45 concurrency; interchange; southbound exit and northbound entrance |
| Manatee | | 231.305 | 372.249 | US 19 north (SR 55) to I-275 north (Sunshine Skyway) – St. Petersburg | Northern end of SR 55 concurrency; interchange; southern terminus of US 19 |
| Manatee | | 234.29 | 377.05 | I-275 (SR 93) to I-75 – St. Petersburg | I-275 exit 2 |
| Manatee | | 235.390 | 378.823 | To I-75 / Moccasin Wallow Road (CR 683 east) | |
| Hillsborough | Ruskin | 246.465 | 396.647 | SR 674 east (College Avenue) to I-75 – Sun City Center | |
| Hillsborough | | 253.131 | 407.375 | CR 672 east (Big Bend Road) to I-75 | |
| Hillsborough | Gibsonton | 257.094 | 413.753 | To I-75 / Gibsonton Drive | |
| Hillsborough | | 260.895 | 419.870 | Madison Avenue (CR 676A east) | |
| Hillsborough | | 262.409 | 422.306 | US 41 Bus. north / SR 676 east (Causeway Boulevard / SR 45 north) – Port of Tampa, Tampa | Northern end of SR 45 concurrency; southern end of SR 599 concurrency |
| Hillsborough | Tampa | 264.26 | 425.29 | SR 618 (Selmon Expressway) to I-75 – Brandon, Tampa, St. Petersburg | SR 618 exit 11 |
| Hillsborough | Tampa | 264.418 | 425.540 | SR 60 (Adamo Drive) – Brandon, Tampa | |
| Hillsborough | Tampa | 265.088 | 426.618 | East Broadway Avenue / 7th Avenue (CR 574) | |
| Hillsborough | Tampa | 265.52 | 427.31 | I-4 (SR 400) – Orlando, Tampa, St. Petersburg | I-4 exit 3 |
| Hillsborough | Tampa | 265.681 | 427.572 | SR 583 north (50th Street) – Temple Terrace, Busch Gardens | |
| Hillsborough | Tampa | 266.520 | 428.922 | SR 569 south (40th Street) | |
| Hillsborough | Tampa | 267.026 | 429.737 | SR 574 (East Martin Luther King Jr. Boulevard) | |
| Hillsborough | Tampa | 268.034 | 431.359 | US 92 east (Hillsborough Avenue / SR 600) | Northern end of SR 599 concurrency; southern end of US 92/SR 600 concurrency |
| Hillsborough | Tampa | 269.299 | 433.395 | SR 585 south (North 22nd Street) – Ybor City Historic District | |
| Hillsborough | Tampa | 270.301 | 435.007 | SR 45 south (Nebraska Avenue) US 92 west (Hillsborough Avenue / SR 600) to I-275 | Northern end of US 92/SR 600 concurrency; southern end of SR 45 concurrency |
| Hillsborough | Tampa | 271.309 | 436.630 | To I-275 / Sligh Avenue | |
| Hillsborough | Tampa | 272.132 | 437.954 | To I-275 south / Bird Street | |
| Hillsborough | Tampa | 272.306 | 438.234 | Waters Avenue | |
| Hillsborough | Tampa | 272.828 | 439.074 | SR 580 (Busch Boulevard) to I-275 | |
| Hillsborough | Tampa | 274.335 | 441.499 | SR 582 (Fowler Avenue) | |
| Hillsborough | | 275.343 | 443.122 | SR 579 west / CR 582A east (East Fletcher Avenue) | |
| Hillsborough | | 276.629 | 445.191 | SR 678 west / CR 678 east (East Bearss Avenue) | |
| Hillsborough | Lutz | 278.302 | 447.884 | US 41 Bus. south (Florida Avenue / SR 685) | Southbound exit and northbound entrance |
| Hillsborough | Lutz | 280.529 | 451.468 | Sunset Lane (CR 583A east) | |
| Hillsborough | Lutz | 281.123 | 452.424 | West Lutz Lake Fern Road | |
| Pasco | Land o' Lakes | 283.572 | 456.365 | SR 597 south (Dale Mabry Highway) to SR 589 (Veterans Expressway) – TIA | No left turn northbound |
| Pasco | Land o' Lakes | 284.010 | 457.070 | SR 54 to I-75 / SR 589 (Suncoast Parkway) | |
| Pasco | Land o' Lakes | 287.546 | 462.760 | CR 583 east (Ehren Cut-Off) | |
| Pasco | Gowers Corner | 293.891 | 472.972 | SR 52 to I-75 / SR 589 (Suncoast Parkway) – Bayonet Point, New Port Richey, San Antonio | |
| Pasco–Hernando county line | | 302.381 | 486.635 | CR 578 west (County Line Road) to SR 589 (Suncoast Parkway) | |
| Hernando | Masaryktown | 303.767 | 488.866 | CR 576 (Ayers Road) | |
| Hernando | Garden Grove | 306.023 | 492.496 | CR 574 west (Spring Hill Drive) – Spring Hill | |
| Hernando | Powell | 306.879 | 493.874 | CR 572 (Powell Road) – Spring Lake | |
| Hernando | Brooksville | 310.059 | 498.992 | CR 570 west (Wiscon Road) | |
| Hernando | Brooksville | 310.523 | 499.738 | SR 50 (Cortez Boulevard / US 98 Truck) to US 98 south / I-75 / SR 589 (Suncoast Parkway) – Weeki Wachee, Ridge Manor | |
| Hernando | Brooksville | 311.326 | 501.031 | SR 700 north (Ponce de Leon Boulevard) to US 98 north – Homosassa Springs, Pasco Hernando Community College | Northbound exit and southbound entrance |
| Hernando | Brooksville | 311.691 | 501.618 | US 98 north / SR 50A north (West Jefferson Street / SR 700 north) to SR 589 (Suncoast Parkway) | Southern end of US 98/SR 50A/SR 700 concurrency; no left turn northbound |
| Hernando | Brooksville | 312.083 | 502.249 | Main Street (CR 445) | |
| Hernando | Brooksville | 312.473 | 502.877 | US 98 south / SR 50A east (East Jefferson Street / SR 700 south) to I-75 | Northern end of US 98/SR 50A/SR 700 concurrency |
| Hernando | Brooksville | 312.754 | 503.329 | CR 484 east (Mondon Hill Road) / East Fort Dade Avenue | |
| Hernando | Brooksville | 313.723 | 504.888 | CR 480 east (Croom Road) | |
| Hernando | Brooksville | 314.498 | 506.135 | CR 445 south (Howell Avenue) | |
| Hernando | | 316.685 | 509.655 | CR 481 north (Snow Memorial Highway) – USF Chinsegut Hill Conference Center | |
| Hernando | | 318.985 | 513.357 | CR 476 (Lake Lindsey Road) – Nobleton, Bushnell, Dade Battlefield Historic State Park | |
| Citrus | | 325.907 | 524.496 | CR 480 west (East Stage Coach Trail) | |
| Citrus | Floral City | 327.250 | 526.658 | CR 48 east (East Orange Avenue) – Bushnell, Dade Battlefield State Historic Site, Floral City Historic District | |
| Citrus | | 329.467 | 530.226 | CR 39A east (East Gobbler Drive) | |
| Citrus | Inverness | 333.471 | 536.670 | SR 44 east to I-75 – Wildwood | Southern end of SR 44 concurrency |
| Citrus | Inverness | 334.381 | 538.134 | SR 44 west (West Main Street) – Crystal River | Northern end of SR 44 concurrency |
| Citrus | Inverness | 334.534 | 538.380 | To CR 581 / Davidson Avenue | |
| Citrus | Hernando | 339.345 | 546.123 | CR 486 west (East Norvell Bryant Highway) – Crystal River | |
| Citrus | Hernando | 339.720 | 546.726 | SR 200 north (Carl G. Rose Highway) | |
| Citrus | Holder | 344.797 | 554.897 | CR 491 (North Lecanto Highway) – Beverly Hills, Ocala | |
| Citrus | | 349.996 | 563.264 | CR 39 south (West Withlacoochee Trail) | |
| Citrus | | 351.061 | 564.978 | CR 488 west (West Dunnellon Road) – Crystal River | |
| Marion | Dunnellon | 351.612 | 565.865 | CR 40 west / CR 336 west / CR 484 east (Pennsylvania Avenue) – Inglis, Belleview, Airport | |
| Marion | Rainbow Lakes Estates | 356.134 | 573.142 | SR 40 east – Ocala | |
| Marion | | 362.252 | 582.988 | CR 328 east | |
| Levy | | 364.705 | 586.936 | CR 464 west (Southeast 60th Street) | Southern end of CR 464 concurrency |
| Levy | | 365.155 | 587.660 | CR 464 east | Northern end of CR 464 concurrency |
| Levy | | 367.452 | 591.357 | CR 323 north / CR 326 east (Southeast 32nd Place) – Morriston | Southern end of CR 326 concurrency |
| Levy | | 367.712 | 591.775 | CR 326 west (Southeast 30th Street) | Northern end of CR 326 concurrency |
| Levy | | 370.787 | 596.724 | CR 322 east | |
| Levy | Williston | 373.823 | 601.610 | SR 121 south / CR 316 east (Northeast 30th Street) – Lebanon Station, St. Petersburg, Airport | Southern end of SR 121 concurrency |
| Levy | Williston | 374.633 | 602.913 | US 27 Alt. north (SR 500) – Bronson | Southern end of US 27 Alt./SR 500 concurrency |
| Levy | Williston | 375.158 | 603.758 | US 27 south (Noble Avenue / SR 500) – Ocala | Northern end of US 27 Alt./SR 500 concurrency; southern end of US 27 concurrency |
| Levy | Williston | 375.578 | 604.434 | SR 121 north (Northeast 6th Boulevard) – Gainesville | Northern end of SR 121 concurrency |
| Levy | | 376.291 | 605.582 | CR 318A east (Northeast 11th Avenue) | |
| Levy | | 377.341 | 607.271 | CR 343 west (Northeast 60th Street) | |
| Levy | Raleigh | 379.073 | 610.059 | CR 335 | |
| Alachua | Archer | 386.122 | 621.403 | CR 346 east | |
| Alachua | Archer | 386.613 | 622.193 | SR 24 – Bronson, Gainesville | |
| Alachua | Archer | 387.266 | 623.244 | CR 241 north (Southwest 170th Street) | |
| Alachua | Newberry | 396.058 | 637.394 | SR 26 (West Newberry Road) – Trenton, Gainesville, Dudley Farm Historic State Park | |
| Alachua | Newberry | 396.487 | 638.084 | Newberry Lane (CR 26A east) | |
| Alachua | | 401.627 | 646.356 | CR 232 (Northwest 78th Avenue) | |
| Alachua | High Springs | 408.038 | 656.674 | CR 340 west (Poe Springs Road) | |
| Alachua | High Springs | 408.641 | 657.644 | US 27 north / SR 20 south (Northwest 1st Avenue / Northeast 1st Avenue) – Fort White, Alachua | Northern end of US 27 concurrency |
| Alachua | High Springs | 408.870 | 658.012 | US 441 south (East Santa Fe Boulevard / SR 25) / CR 236 east (North Main Street) – Santa Fe | north end of SR 45 overlap; south end of US 441 / SR 25 overlap |
| Santa Fe River | | 410.709 | 660.972 | Bridge | |
| Columbia | | 413.024 | 664.698 | CR 778 west | |
| Columbia | | 416.450 | 670.211 | CR 18 west – Fort White | |
| Columbia | Mikesville | 417.523 | 671.938 | CR 18 east – Worthington Springs | |
| Columbia | Ellisville | 420.85 | 677.29 | I-75 (SR 93) – Alachua | I-75 exit 414 |
| Columbia | Ellisville | 421.123 | 677.732 | SR 238 east – Providence, Lake Butler | |
| Columbia | | 422.866 | 680.537 | CR 349 | |
| Columbia | Myrtis | 425.388 | 684.596 | CR 240 west / Southeast Myrtis Road | |
| Columbia | | 427.932 | 688.690 | CR 133C east (Southeast Alfred Markham Street) | |
| Columbia | | 429.349 | 690.970 | CR 242A west | |
| Columbia | | 429.872 | 691.812 | CR 133B east (Southeast Race Track Lane) | |
| Columbia | | 430.865 | 693.410 | CR 131 south | |
| Columbia | | 431.518 | 694.461 | CR 252 east | |
| Columbia | | 431.599 | 694.591 | US 441 north (SR 25A) – VA Hospital, Airport | Northern end of US 441 concurrency; southern end of US 441 Truck concurrency; no left turn southbound |
| Columbia | Lake City | 432.869 | 696.635 | To SR 47 / Southwest Bascom Norris Drive | |
| Columbia | Lake City | 433.268 | 697.277 | SR 47 south | Southern end of SR 47 concurrency; southbound exit and northbound entrance |
| Columbia | Lake City | 434.240 | 698.842 | SR 10A (Southwest Baya Drive) – VA Hospital | |
| Columbia | Lake City | 434.658 | 699.514 | US 90 (West Duval Street / SR 10 / SR 47 north / SR 100 east) to I-75 / SR 100 – Live Oak, Macclenny, Florida Gateway College, Airport | Northern end of SR 47 concurrency; southern end of SR 100 concurrency |
| Columbia | Lake City | 435.691 | 701.177 | CR 100A east / US 441 Truck north (Northwest Bascom Norris Drive) | Northern end of US 441 Truck concurrency |
| Columbia | | 438.913 | 706.362 | CR 25A south | |
| Columbia | | 439.14 | 706.73 | I-10 (SR 8) – Live Oak, Jacksonville | I-10 exit 301 |
| Columbia | | 439.350 | 707.065 | CR 131 north (Northwest Falling Creek Road) – Falling Creek Falls Park | |
| Columbia | | 444.400 | 715.192 | CR 246 east (Northwest Lassie Black Street) | |
| Hamilton | White Springs | 446.918 | 719.245 | CR 135 north (Third Street) – Big Shoals | |
| Hamilton | White Springs | 447.411 | 720.038 | SR 136 west (Bridge Street) to I-75 – Live Oak | |
| Hamilton | White Springs | 447.739 | 720.566 | CR 25A north | |
| Hamilton | Facil | 450.823 | 725.529 | CR 137 north | |
| Hamilton | Genoa | 454.287 | 731.104 | CR 132 west | |
| Hamilton | Hillcoat | 460.727 | 741.468 | CR 137 south | |
| Hamilton | | 462.637 | 744.542 | US 129 south (SR 51) to I-75 – Live Oak | Southern end of US 129/SR 51 concurrency |
| Hamilton | Jasper | 464.988 | 748.326 | CR 6 east (Hatley Street) | Northern end of SR 51 concurrency; southern end of SR 6 concurrency |
| Hamilton | Jasper | 465.044 | 748.416 | Northeast First Avenue (CR 51 north) | |
| Hamilton | Jasper | 465.158 | 748.599 | Southwest First Avenue (CR 249 south) | |
| Hamilton | Jasper | 465.973 | 749.911 | Northwest 15th Avenue (CR 152 south) | |
| Hamilton | Jasper | 466.038 | 750.015 | US 129 north (SR 100) – Statenville | Northern end of US 129/SR 100 concurrency |
| Hamilton | | 470.938 | 757.901 | SR 6 west to I-75 – Madison | Northern end of SR 6 concurrency |
| Hamilton | | 472.880 | 761.027 | CR 152 west | |
| Hamilton | Jennings | 476.866 | 767.441 | CR 141 south | |
| Hamilton | Jennings | 477.082 | 767.789 | SR 143 south / CR 141 north (Hamilton Avenue / Scenic Route) to I-75 | |
| Hamilton | Jennings | 478.920 | 770.747 | US 41 north / SR 7 north – Lake Park, Valdosta | Georgia state line |
1.000 mi = 1.609 km; 1.000 km = 0.621 mi: Concurrency terminus; Incomplete access

== See also ==
- Special routes of U.S. Route 41

U.S. Route 41
| Previous state: Terminus | Florida | Next state: Georgia |
