= Dale Mabry Highway =

North–south road in Tampa, Florida, USA

Dale Mabry Highway
- State Road 573, US Route 92, State Road 597
- Dale Mabry Highway highlighted in red

Route information
- Length: 22.644 mi (36.442 km)
- Existed: 1943–present

Major junctions
- South end: MacDill Air Force Base in Tampa
- I-275 in Tampa
- North end: US 41 in Land o' Lakes

Location
- Country: United States
- State: Florida
- Counties: Hillsborough, Pasco

Highway system
- Florida State Highway System; Interstate; US; State; Former; Pre‑1945; Toll; Scenic
← SR 570B	SR 573	→ SR 574
← SR 595	SR 597	→ SR 599

Dale Mabry Highway is a north–south road in Tampa, Florida. The majority of its length consists of three lanes each direction plus a central turn-lane and often includes a right-turn lane. It begins at the MacDill Air Force Base entrance in South Tampa and ends by merging with US 41 just north of the Pasco County line. The highway carries multiple designations, carrying US 92 for an approximately five-mile (8.0 km) stretch between Hillsborough Avenue and Gandy Boulevard.

Dale Mabry Highway has many items of interest, including Raymond James Stadium, George M. Steinbrenner Field, Tampa International Airport, the Dale Mabry branch of the Hillsborough Community College, Plant High School, Gaither High School, shopping centers, car dealerships and restaurants.

== Route description ==
Dale Mabry Highway carries several designations throughout its route.

The lane counts along the highway are as follows.

- Four lanes (divided) from MacDill AFB to Euclid Ave.
- Four lanes (undivided) from Euclid Ave to Kennedy Boulevard (State Road 60).
- Six lanes (mostly divided, with some segments containing center turn lane) from Kennedy Boulevard to Van Dyke Rd. With a brief four lane section at Hillsborough Ave.
- Mostly six lanes (mostly divided, with some segments containing center turn lane) from Ehrlich Rd/Bearss Ave to State Road 568 (Veterans Expressway).
- Four lanes (divided) from State Road 568 (Veterans Expressway) to US 41.

The speed limit for most of the length is 45 mph (72 km/h). There is a 55 mph (89 km/h) speed limit on the segment north of State Road 568.

=== MacDill Air Force Base to Gandy Boulevard (SR 573) ===
The southern portion of Dale Mabry Highway between MacDill AFB and Gandy Boulevard (US 92, SR 600) is designated as State Road 573 for its entire length. This portion is also cosigned with unsigned SR 685. This section is four lanes wide, divided. Until the late 1990s, a Jai Alai fronton stood on the west side of the highway just south of Gandy Boulevard. The facility closed in July 1998 after 45 years of operation after the parent company of the fronton sold the 40-acre (160,000 m^{2}) property for $8.3 million. Today, a Home Depot and Sam's Club store sit on the property.

Originally a two-lane stretch, a widening project took place in the 1970s, increasing the road to four lanes. The project was at least partly contributed by the construction of the Lee Roy Selmon Expressway in 1974. In 2002, a roundabout was constructed just north of the main gate to MacDill as part of a security enhancement and road improvement project for the base.

=== Gandy Boulevard to Hillsborough Avenue (US 92) ===
The section of Dale Mabry Highway between Gandy Boulevard and Hillsborough Avenue is signed as U.S. Route 92 (State Road 600). This stretch of Dale Mabry Highway snakes through several south Tampa business areas and a residential district before approaching Raymond James Stadium with the SR 685 concurrency ending at Henderson Boulevard. The section of Dale Mabry between Gandy Boulevard and Kennedy Boulevard (SR 60) remains four lanes with moderate improvements taking place over the years, such as intersection improvements. The section of highway from Kennedy northward is six lanes with many businesses surrounding the highway.

Until 2000, the section of highway between Gandy Boulevard and Euclid Ave was two lanes. Additionally a 1950s era overpass stood over a CSX rail corridor just north of the Lee Roy Selmon Crosstown Expressway. The overpass was torn down in the late 1990s and replaced with an at-grade railroad crossing as part of a widening project which increased that section to four lanes.

=== Hillsborough Avenue to Busch Boulevard/Gunn Highway (SR 580) ===
The section of Dale Marby Highway between Hillsborough Avenue and Busch Boulevard/Gunn Highway is signed as a portion of State Road 580. The Hillsborough Avenue interchange is a remnant of a failed freeway plan along Dale Mabry Highway. The original North Crosstown Expressway was supposed to have connected Dale Mabry at this (or the MLK) intersection, but was killed as well. Along the highway in the stadium and Northdale area are many businesses, more specifically car dealerships. The overall scene along Dale Mabry however, begins to shift from to a more suburban setting. The Busch/Gunn Interchange at the end of this stretch is also a remnant of the canceled expressway.

=== Busch Boulevard/Gunn Highway to U.S. Route 41 (SR 597) ===
The northern portion of Dale Mabry Highway between Busch Boulevard/Gunn Highway and U.S. Route 41 is designated as State Road 597's entire length. This section of Dale Mabry Highway continues to be four to six lanes north of Bearss Ave up to the Veterans Expressway. The line of businesses and apartment/condo developments continue along the highway until the Veterans Expressway. North of the expressway, the highway changes to a more rural setting towards the terminus of US 41, where it also crosses the CSX Brooksville Subdivision.

North of the expressway, the highway used to narrow back down to two lanes as it snaked through a rural setting to US 41. This scene has since changed, as Dale Mabry between the Veterans and US 41 was widened to four lanes in 1996.

=== Surfacing ===
Dale Mabry Highway is also one of the last roads in Hillsborough County to include concrete (driving surface) segments (Hillsborough Avenue and Bayshore Boulevard are the other major, non-interstate, arteries that have concrete segments). Originally, the concrete segment was continuous, stretching from MacDill AFB to just south of Hillsborough Ave. However, after numerous intersection modifications and widening over the years, some of the original areas have disappeared as they were replaced by asphalt surfaces. The existing concrete surfaces have since been rehabilitated, though there is a 1-mile (or less) exception between Spruce and Cypress Streets. The only reason why that noted section was not rehabilitated is because of pending reconstruction on Interstate 275.

== History ==
Originally constructed in 1943 to connect MacDill Air Force Base with Drew Field, Dale Mabry Highway was named after Dale Mabry, a Florida native and World War I aviator. Dale Mabry runs along what was originally called Vera Ave. according to land plots from the Hillsborough County Property Appraiser. The highway has seen many changes throughout the years, including an extension to US 41 in Pasco County, and several major widening projects.

During the 1960s/1970s, a portion of Dale Mabry Highway was to be converted into a limited-access highway between what was then I-4 (now I-275) to the Northwest Hillsborough Expressway (now Veterans Expressway's eastern terminus). The plan was scrapped after overpasses over Hillsborough Avenue and Busch Boulevard were built, relieving congestion at what would be very busy intersections.

Dale Mabry Highway is typical of a roadway in a suburban sprawl setting. The road is a minimum four lanes wide along its entirety and in many places has wide medians, no sidewalks, and open drainage.

== Major intersections ==
County	Location	mi	km	Destinations	Notes
Hillsborough	Tampa	0.000	0.000	MacDill Air Force Base	
Hillsborough	Tampa	1.842	2.964	US 92 west (Gandy Boulevard / SR 600) – St. Petersburg	North end of SR 573; south end of US 92 / SR 600 overlap
Hillsborough	Tampa	2.01	3.23	SR 618 east (Selmon Expressway) to I-75 – Brandon, Downtown Tampa	SR 618 exit 1; no access from Dale Mabry south to SR 618 east
Hillsborough	Tampa	4.609	7.417	SR 685 north (Henderson Boulevard)	No left turn southbound
Hillsborough	Tampa	5.363	8.631	SR 60 (West Kennedy Boulevard) – Tampa, Clearwater	
Hillsborough	Tampa	6.061	9.754	I-275 (SR 93) to I-4 – Ocala, Orlando, St. Petersburg	I-275 exit 41
Hillsborough	Tampa	6.875	11.064	SR 616 west (West Columbus Drive) – Tampa International Airport, Clearwater	
Hillsborough	Tampa	7.892	12.701	SR 574 east (West Dr. Martin Luther King Jr. Boulevard)	
Hillsborough	Tampa	8.887	14.302	US 92 east / SR 580 west (Hillsborough Avenue / SR 600 east)	Interchange; north end of US 92 / SR 600 overlap; south end of SR 580 overlap
Hillsborough		9.651	15.532	Lambright Street (CR 598 east) - Lowry Park Zoo	
Hillsborough		10.911	17.560	To SR 589 (Veterans Expressway) / West Waters Avenue (CR 584 west / CR 587A east)	
Hillsborough		11.675	18.789	SR 580 east (Busch Boulevard) / CR 587 west (Gunn Highway) – Temple Terrace, Busch Gardens, Citrus Park	Interchange; north end of SR 580 overlap; south end of SR 597
Hillsborough		13.684	22.022	West Fletcher Avenue (CR 582A east)	
Hillsborough		15.033	24.193	Ehrlich Road / Bearss Avenue (CR 678)	
Hillsborough		18.028	29.013	CR 685A west (Van Dyke Road) to SR 589	
Hillsborough	Cheval	18.39	29.60	SR 568 west (Veterans Expressway) to SR 589 south / I-275 – Clearwater, St. Petersburg, Tampa International Airport	
Hillsborough	Lutz	20.494	32.982	Lutz Lake Fern Road (CR 582 west)	
Pasco	Land o' Lakes	22.644	36.442	US 41 (SR 45)	
1.000 mi = 1.609 km; 1.000 km = 0.621 mi: Concurrency terminus
