= Florida State Road 569 =

State highway in Florida, United States

State Road 569

Route information
- Maintained by FDOT
- Length: 1.331 mi (2.142 km)

Major junctions
- South end: SR 60 in Tampa
- North end: US 41 in Tampa

Location
- Country: United States
- State: Florida
- Counties: Hillsborough

Highway system
- Florida State Highway System; Interstate; US; State; Former; Pre‑1945; Toll; Scenic
← SR 568	→ SR 570

State Road 569 (SR 569) is a short state road located entirely in Tampa, Florida. Also known as 39th Street south of 11th Avenue and 40th Street north of it, it is approximately 1.3 miles (2.1 km) long.

The I-4/Crosstown Connector parallels this state route for most of its length.

== Route description ==
With 6 lanes, the northern terminus is with an intersection of US 41/SR 599. Formerly, SR 569 had an interchange with Interstate 4 (I-4) at exit 2, but later closed in 2005 due to I-4's widening project and the future I-4/Crosstown Connector.

South of I-4, the highway loses a lane in each direction and makes an S bend. It next intersects CR 574, an access road to Ybor City. It then intersects the CSX Tampa Terminal Subdivision, and later reaches its southern terminus, State Road 60.

SR 569's previous southern terminus was with exit 10 of the Lee Roy Selmon Expressway (SR 618), which was immediately on the south side of SR 60, but closed May 13, 2010 due to construction of the I-4/Crosstown Connector.

== Major intersections ==
The entire route is in Tampa, Hillsborough County.

mi	km	Destinations	Notes
0.000	0.000	SR 60 (East Adamo Drive)	
0.334	0.538	East 7th Avenue (CR 574)	
0.824	1.326	To I-4 / East Columbus Drive	
1.331	2.142	US 41 (East 26th Avenue / North 40th Street / SR 599)	
1.000 mi = 1.609 km; 1.000 km = 0.621 mi
