= Florida State Road 678 =

Highway in Florida

State Road 678
- Bearss Avenue

Route information
- Maintained by FDOT
- Length: 0.501 mi (806 m)

Major junctions
- West end: US 41 Bus. near Tampa
- I-275 near Tampa
- East end: US 41 near Tampa

Location
- Country: United States
- State: Florida
- Counties: Hillsborough

Highway system
- Florida State Highway System; Interstate; US; State; Former; Pre‑1945; Toll; Scenic
← SR 676	→ SR 679

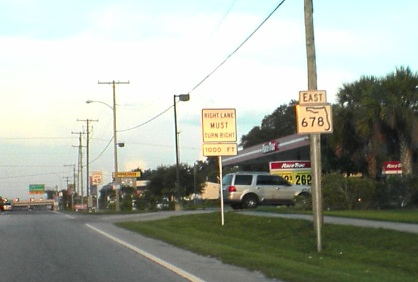
SR 678 road sign in Tampa, Florida. An Interstate 275 overpass can be seen in the background.

State Road 678 (SR 678) is a 0.501-mile (0.806 km) stretch of Bearss Avenue between (Business US 41 (U.S. Route 41 Bus.) and SR 685 (Florida Avenue) and US 41/SR 45 (Nebraska Avenue) in Tampa, Florida. Similar to SR 579 to the south, it connects those two north–south roads with Interstate 275 (I-275 or SR 93), halfway between them. SR 678 is signed east–west.

== Route description ==
SR 678 serves as a connector between US 41 Business and US 41. State Road 678 has its western terminus at an interchange with US 41 Business. At this point, Bearss Avenue, designated as County Road 678, becomes State Road 678. Immediately the roadway widens to 6 lanes as it begins its eastern route. The state road along its entire stretch goes through a commercial district with numerous strip malls. After .3 miles from its western terminus, State Road 678 has an interchange with Interstate 275, providing access to both the interstate's northbound and southbound lanes. After the interchange, the number of lanes on the road thins down to 4. State Road 678 continues through the shopping district before each its eastern terminus with US 41 after .2 miles. At its eastern terminus, East Bearss Avenue loses its state road signage and returns to being County Road 678.

== Major intersections ==
The entire route is in Hillsborough County.

Location	mi	km	Destinations	Notes
	0.000	0.000	US 41 Bus. (North Florida Avenue / SR 685) / CR 678 west (West Bearss Avenue) – Tampa, Lutz	
	0.293	0.472	I-275 (SR 93) – Ocala, St. Petersburg	I-275 exit 53
	0.501	0.806	US 41 (North Nebraska Avenue / SR 45) / CR 678 east (East Bearss Avenue) – Lutz, Tampa	
1.000 mi = 1.609 km; 1.000 km = 0.621 mi
