= Florida State Road 579 =

State highway in Florida, United States

State Road 579
- Fletcher Avenue

Route information
- Maintained by FDOT
- Length: 0.499 mi (803 m)

Major junctions
- West end: US 41 Bus. near Tampa
- I-275 near Tampa
- East end: US 41 near Tampa

Location
- Country: United States
- State: Florida
- Counties: Hillsborough

Highway system
- Florida State Highway System; Interstate; US; State; Former; Pre‑1945; Toll; Scenic
← SR 575	→ SR 580

State Road 579 (SR 579) is a 0.5-mile (0.80 km) stretch of Fletcher Avenue between Florida Avenue and Nebraska Avenue in Tampa, Florida. Similar to SR 678 to the north, it exists to connect U.S. Route 41 (US 41 or SR 45), Interstate 275 (SR 93), and US 41 Business (US 41 Bus. or SR 685). Despite its odd-numbered Florida Department of Transportation designation, SR 579 is signed east–west.

== History ==
The current SR 579 is a remnant of a much longer one, extending from the current western terminus to an intersection with SR 54 near Zephyrhills, following Fletcher Avenue to an interchange with Interstate 75 (I-75 or SR 93A), then turning northeastward and following Morris Bridge Road through Branchton and toward SR 54. Fletcher Avenue between Nebraska Avenue and I-75 was later redesignated State Road 582A (and a spur, 50th Street between Fletcher Avenue and Fowler Avenue adjacent to University of South Florida, became State Road 582B) while Morris Bridge Road was transitioned to County Road 579. Eventually SR 582A and SR 582B were transferred to county control.

== Major intersections ==
The entire route is in Hillsborough County.

Location	mi	km	Destinations	Notes
	0.000	0.000	US 41 Bus. (North Florida Avenue / SR 685) / CR 582A west (West Fletcher Avenue) – Tampa, Lutz	
	0.29	0.47	I-275 (SR 93) – Ocala, St. Petersburg	I-275 exit 52
	0.499	0.803	US 41 (North Nebraska Avenue / SR 45) / CR 582A east (East Fletcher Avenue)	
1.000 mi = 1.609 km; 1.000 km = 0.621 mi

== Other segments ==
There are two other segments in Hillsborough County that carry the County Road 579 designation - one stretch from US 301 in Thonotosassa to SR 574 in Mango; and another from SR 674 in Wimauma to SR 62 east of Parrish in Manatee County.

== Historic State Road 579 ==
In the 1950s and 1960s a different SR 579 was in existence, not in Hillsborough County but Dade (now Miami-Dade) County. Locally known as Biscayne Drive and Southwest 288th Street, the historic State Road 579 was a 3.2-mile (5.1 km) east–west street connecting South Dixie Highway (U.S. Route 1/SR 5) in Homestead to the west (primary) gate of Homestead Air Force Base.

While Homestead AFB was downgraded to a smaller Homestead Air Reserve Base after its destruction by Hurricane Andrew in 1993, Coral Castle, a tourist attraction at the western end of historic SR 579, has remained essentially unchanged since the FDOT signs were removed from Biscayne Drive in the late 1960s. The predominantly rural nature of the area on both sides of the street in the 1950s and 1960s has been gradually giving way to urbanization since the 1980s and the trend appears to be accelerating throughout the former Homestead AFB property and further south in Miami-Dade County, particularly along the nearby Homestead Extension of Florida's Turnpike.
