= Florida State Road 568 =

State highway in Florida, United States

State Road 568
- Veterans Expressway
- SR 568 highlighted in red

Route information
- Maintained by Florida's Turnpike Enterprise
- Length: 3.036 mi (4.886 km)
- Existed: 1994 (opened); 2001 (as SR 568)–present

Major junctions
- West end: SR 589 near Citrus Park
- East end: SR 597 near Lutz

Location
- Country: United States
- State: Florida
- Counties: Hillsborough

Highway system
- Florida State Highway System; Interstate; US; State; Former; Pre‑1945; Toll; Scenic
← SR 566	→ SR 569

State Road 568 (SR 568) is a short freeway stub of the Veterans Expressway (SR 589) north of Tampa. The road was built in 1994, but was reassigned as SR 568 in 2001 when SR 589 moved to the new Suncoast Parkway. It connects the aforementioned SR 589 to SR 597. SR 568 is on the segment of the Veterans Expressway that was intended to be extended to Lutz, Florida in the vicinity of the northern interchange with I-75 and I-275.

== Route description ==
SR 568 begins at Exit 13 on the Veterans Expressway northbound, where the main freeway northbound becomes the Suncoast Parkway. The road heads east as a four-lane freeway, ending at its lone interchange at a traffic signal at SR 597. There is no access to the Suncoast Parkway from SR 568 or vice versa; motorists heading west on SR 568 will be heading south on the Veterans Expressway. Despite having no tolls on the spur, those using the road will have to pay a toll on the Veterans Expressway.

== History ==
The road was built as a part of the Veterans Expressway, and opened in 1994. The road was planned to extend eastward to Lutz and I-275, however, local opposition has cancelled the East-West Road. When the Suncoast Parkway was opened in 2001 as a de facto extension of the Veterans Expressway, the resulting three mile spur was reassigned as SR 568.

== Exit list ==
The entire route is in Hillsborough County.

Location	mi	km	Destinations	Notes
Northdale	0.000	0.000	SR 589 south (Veterans Expressway) – Clearwater, St. Petersburg	Western terminus; exit 13 on SR 589
Cheval	3.036	4.886	SR 597 (Dale Mabry Highway) – Tampa, Lutz	Eastern terminus; at-grade intersection
1.000 mi = 1.609 km; 1.000 km = 0.621 mi
