= Florida State Road 43 =

Highway in Florida, US

State Road 43

Route information
- Maintained by FDOT
- Length: 41.492 mi (66.775 km)
- Existed: 1945–present

Major junctions
- South end: US 41 Bus. in Palmetto
- North end: US 301 near Tampa

Location
- Country: United States
- State: Florida
- Counties: Manatee, Hillsborough

Highway system
- Florida State Highway System; Interstate; US; State; Former; Pre‑1945; Toll; Scenic
← SR 41	→ SR 44

State Road 43 (SR 43) is the unsigned state designation for U.S. Route 301 between Palmetto and the Florida State Fairgrounds, just south of Interstate 4. Names of the road include 10th Street West in Manatee County (which includes a portion not signed as any route) and Tampa East Boulevard in Hillsborough County.

A short unsigned County Road 43 continues west from Palmetto towards Emerson Point.

== Major intersections ==
County	Location	mi	km	Destinations	Notes
Manatee	Palmetto	0.000	0.000	US 41 Bus. (8th Avenue West / SR 45) – Bradenton, Ruskin	
Manatee	Palmetto	0.64	1.03	US 41 / US 301 south (SR 55) to US 19 north – Bradenton, Manatee Fairgrounds, St. Petersburg	interchange; south end of US 301 overlap
see US 301 (mile 14.44-55.291)
Hillsborough		41.492	66.775	Elm Fair Boulevard – State Fairgrounds, Amphitheatre US 301 north (SR 41) – Zephyrhills	
1.000 mi = 1.609 km; 1.000 km = 0.621 mi
