= Florida State Road 616 =

State highway in Florida, United States

State Road 616
- Boy Scout Boulevard; Spruce Street

Route information
- Maintained by FDOT
- Length: 2.702 mi (4.348 km)

Major junctions
- West end: SR 60 / SR 589 in Tampa
- East end: US 92 in Tampa

Location
- Country: United States
- State: Florida

Highway system
- Florida State Highway System; Interstate; US; State; Former; Pre‑1945; Toll; Scenic
← SR 615	→ SR 618

State Road 616 (SR 616) is an east–west road consisting of two wide streets near Tampa International Airport; West Spruce Street, and Boy Scout Boulevard. It runs from the interchange with Veterans Expressway and George J. Bean Parkway to Dale Mabry Highway (U.S. Route 92 or US 92). In September 2001, the International Plaza shopping mall opened on the corner of SR 616 and West Shore Blvd.

State Road 616 was originally a free section of State Road 589 when SR 60/589 overlapped between Exits 1 and 2A. SR 589 was planned to be extended to a connecting road between I-275 & the Lee Roy Selmon Expressway, which would've led to a change in the designation for West Spruce Street and Boy Scout Boulevard. The connection between the Veterans and Crosstown Expressways was cancelled, but the free section of SR 589 was converted anyway.

== Major intersections ==
The entire route is in Tampa, Hillsborough County.

mi	km	Destinations	Notes
0.000	0.000	SR 60 west / SR 589 north (Veterans Expressway) – Clearwater	interchange; no access from SR 616 west to SR 60 east/SR 589 south; SR 589 exit 1B
0.5	0.80	Tampa International Airport	interchange; westbound exit and eastbound entrance
0.911	1.466	Airport Service Road / O'Brien Street	
1.379	2.219	CR 587 south (Westshore Boulevard)	
2.702	4.348	US 92 (North Dale Mabry Highway / SR 600)	
1.000 mi = 1.609 km; 1.000 km = 0.621 mi
