= Old Lutz Elementary School =

- U.S. National Register of Historic Places
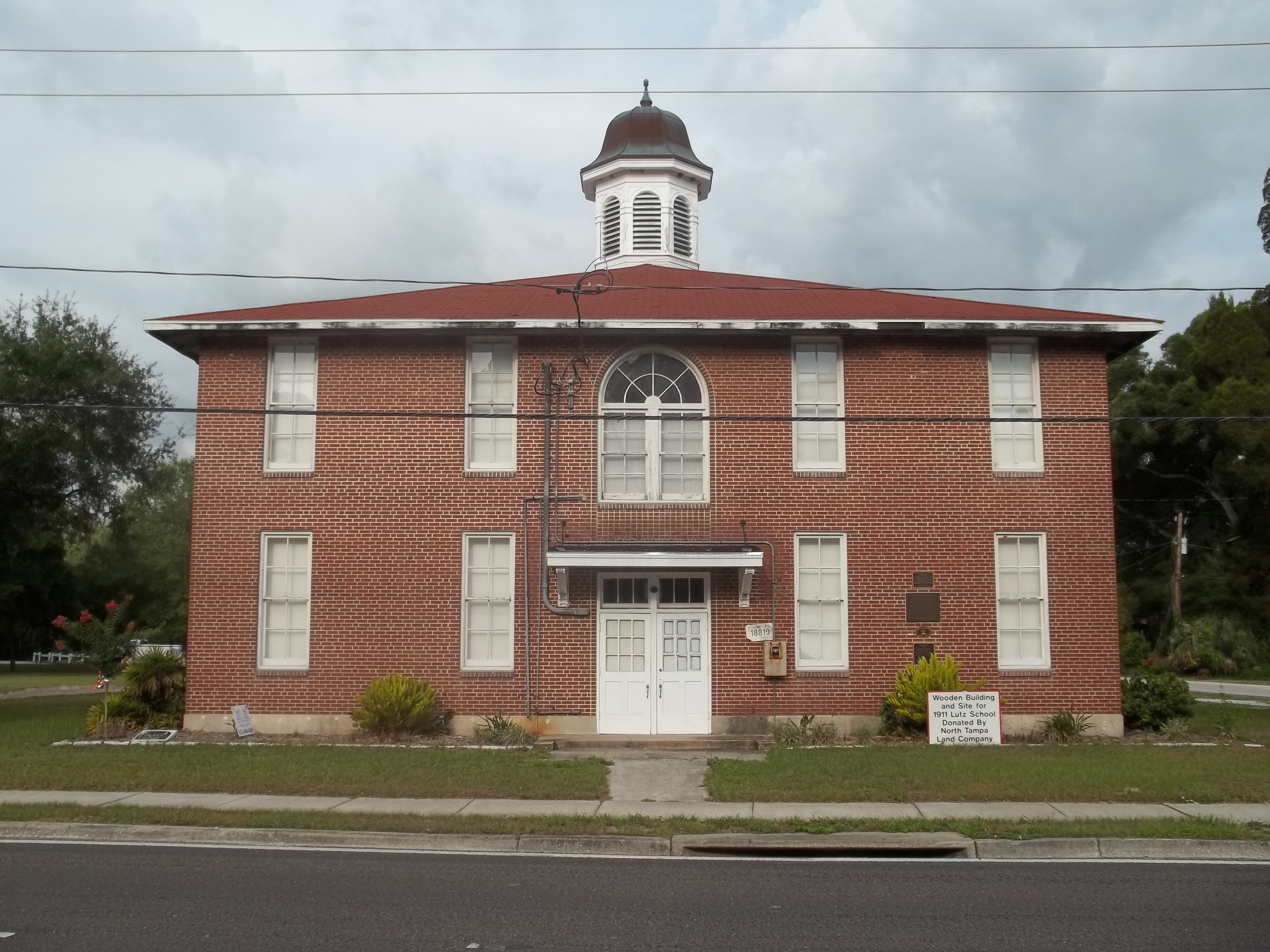

- Location within Florida Location within the United States
- Location: 18819 U.S. 41, North; Lutz, Florida
- Coordinates: 28°08′52″N 82°27′42″W
- Area: 1 acre (0.40 ha)
- Built: 1927
- Architect: Frank A. Winn, Jr.
- Architectural style: Colonial Revival
- NRHP reference No.: 96000852
- Added to NRHP: August 15, 1996

The Old Lutz Elementary School (also known as the Old Lutz Schoolhouse) is a historic school in Lutz, Florida. It is located at 18819 U.S. 41, North. On August 15, 1996, it was added to the U.S. National Register of Historic Places.
