= Florida State Road 685 =

State highway in Florida, United States

State Road 685

Route information
- Maintained by FDOT
- Length: 14.683 mi (23.630 km)

Major junctions
- South end: US 92 in Tampa
- North end: US 41 in Lutz

Location
- Country: United States
- State: Florida
- Counties: Hillsborough

Highway system
- Florida State Highway System; Interstate; US; State; Former; Pre‑1945; Toll; Scenic
← SR 684	→ SR 686

State Road 685 (SR 685) is mainly a north–south highway in Tampa, Florida. From Dale Mabry Highway in South Tampa, the route follows Henderson Boulevard northeasterly for roughly one mile to Kennedy Blvd/SR 60. The remainder of the route is unsigned, but the hidden designation follows Kennedy Boulevard eastward to U.S. Route 41 Business (US 41 Bus.), at which point it turns north and becomes that highway's secret designation for just over 11 miles (18 km) until the merge with US 41 near Lutz.

== Major intersections ==
The entire route is in Hillsborough County.

Location	mi	km	Destinations	Notes
Tampa	0.000	0.000	US 92 (Dale Mabry Highway / SR 600)	
Tampa	0.983	1.582	SR 60 west (West Kennedy Boulevard)	south end of SR 60 overlap; no left turn northbound
Tampa	3.111	5.007	Kennedy Boulevard Bridge over Hillsborough River	
Tampa	3.197	5.145	To I-275 / I-4 / Ashley Street North	
Tampa	3.416	5.498	US 41 Bus. south / SR 60 east (Jackson Street East) to SR 618 (Selmon Expressway) / Tampa Street North – Brandon, Bartow	north end of SR 60 overlap; south end of US 41 Bus. overlap
see US 41 Bus. (mile 5.492-16.703)
Lutz	14.683	23.630	US 41 north (SR 45)	
1.000 mi = 1.609 km; 1.000 km = 0.621 mi: Concurrency terminus
