= Manatee Technical College =

College in Bradenton, Florida, US

Coordinates: 27°26′52″N 82°28′52″W

Manatee Technical College, originally Manatee Vocational and Technical Center (MVTC) and later renamed Manatee Technical Institute, is in Bradenton, Florida.

== History ==
In 1963 the campus on 20 acres near what is now 57th Avenue and 26th Street West opened for Manatee County Vocational and Technical Center. In 2014 it changed its name from Manatee Technical Institute.

Its East Campus is in Lakewood Ranch.

== Faculty ==
As of 2018, one of its professors had received eight patents.

== Programs ==
In 2024 it hosted a "Construction Rodeo" for high school students to experience some of the work involved in careers in the construction field.

It has had a Law Enforcement Academy. It has a Fire Academy. Testing at one of its Fire Academy sites showed groundwater contamination but no wells were located in the area at the time. It also has surgical technology and videography programs.

The school has had a nursing program for over 50 years.

== Theft ==
An employee allegedly stole financial aid money for four years.
