= Fort Myers Downtown Commercial District =

Historic district in Florida, United States

- U.S. National Register of Historic Places
- U.S. Historic district
- Corner of First and Hendry in the Fort Myers Downtown Commercial District

- Location within Florida Location within the United States
- Location: Fort Myers, Florida
- Coordinates: 26°38′38″N 81°52′6″W
- Area: 82 acres (330,000 m^{2})
- NRHP reference No.: 89002325
- Added to NRHP: January 26, 1990

The Fort Myers Downtown Commercial District is a U.S. historic district (designated as such on January 26, 1990) located in Fort Myers, Florida. The district is bounded by Bay and Lee Streets, Martin Luther King Jr. Blvd and Monroe Street. It contains 69 historic buildings. The area is notable for being made up primarily of local shops.

Thomas Edison and Henry Ford both had summer homes off of McGregor Boulevard, which is located near the Downtown District. Tours of their estates are available.

1914 First National Bank Building

Arcade Theatre Building
