= Naples Historic District =

Historic district in Florida, United States

- U.S. National Register of Historic Places
- U.S. Historic district
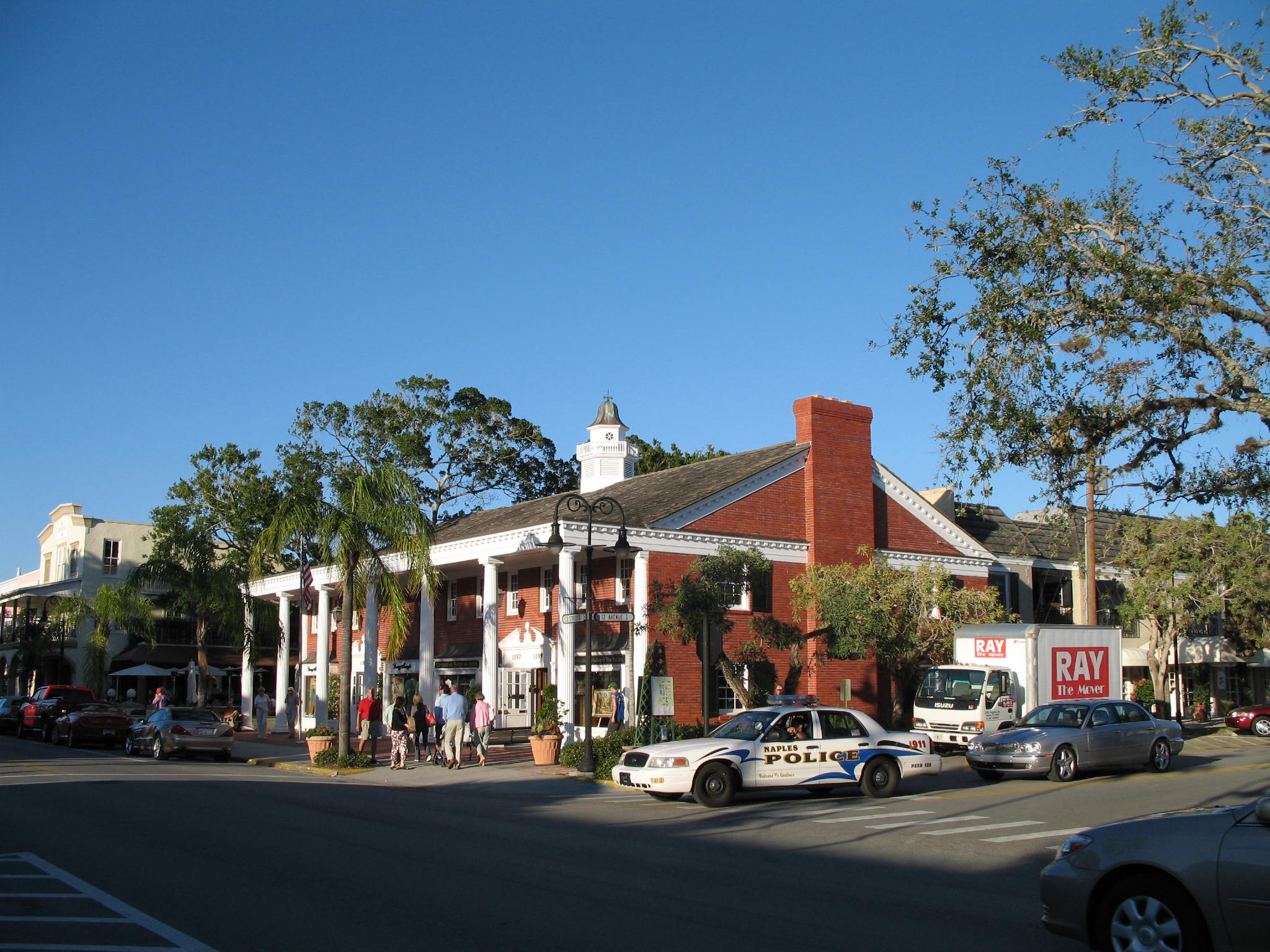

- Location within Florida Location within the United States
- Location: Naples, Florida
- Coordinates: 26°8′0″N 81°48′17″W
- Area: 500 acres (2.0 km^{2})
- NRHP reference No.: 87002179
- Added to NRHP: December 17, 1987

The Naples Historic District is a U.S. historic district listed on the National Register of Historic Places in 1987, located in Naples, Florida. The 500 acres (2.0 km^{2}) district is bounded by Ninth Avenue S, 3rd Street, Thirteenth Avenue S, and the Gulf of Mexico. It contains 65 historic houses, two historic commercial buildings, and 26 non-contributing buildings. The historic development was from 1887 to 1937.

The oldest buildings are "simple, frame vernacular cottages which exhibit small hints of Queen Anne and Stick style influences" such as The Haldeman House, on the beach at Twelfth Avenue South.

The contributing building addresses are:

- Broad Avenue South #s: 38, 50, 53, 75, 88, 91, 107, 110, 131, 151, 165, 180, 187, 207, 239, 245
- Tenth Avenue South #s: 32, 112, 132, 144, 149, 163, 215, 255, 263, 264, 273, 290
- Gulf Shore Boulevard #s: 926, 1037, 1111, 1120, 1144
- Second Street South #s: 1180, 1188
- Third Street South #s: 1148, 1177
- Eleventh Avenue South #s: 12, 15, 44, 88, 111, 123, 157, 175, 205, 210, 223, 230, 231, 244, 255, 256, 269, 272, 281, 287
- Ninth Avenue South #s: 40, 62
- Twelfth Avenue South #s: 50, 71, 95, 111, 137
- Thirteenth Avenue South #s: 40, 55, 76.
