= Florida State Road 45 =

State highway in Florida, United States

State Road 45

Route information
- Maintained by FDOT
- Length: 300.547 mi (483.684 km)

Major junctions
- South end: US 41 in Naples
- North end: US 41 / US 441 / CR 236 in High Springs

Location
- Country: United States
- State: Florida
- Counties: Collier, Lee, Charlotte, Sarasota, Manatee, Hillsborough, Pasco, Hernando, Citrus, Marion, Levy, Alachua

Highway system
- Florida State Highway System; Interstate; US; State; Former; Pre‑1945; Toll; Scenic
← SR 44	SR 45, SR 45A	→ SR 46

State Road 45 (SR 45) is a major north–south highway extending almost the entire length of the Florida peninsula. It is the mostly unsigned designation from the Florida Department of Transportation (FDOT) for most of the current U.S. Highway 41 (US 41) in the state. The southern terminus of SR 45 is an intersection with SR 90 in downtown Naples; the northern terminus is an intersection with US 441 (SR 25) in High Springs. South of Causeway Boulevard (SR 676) near Tampa, SR 45 is also known as Tamiami Trail.

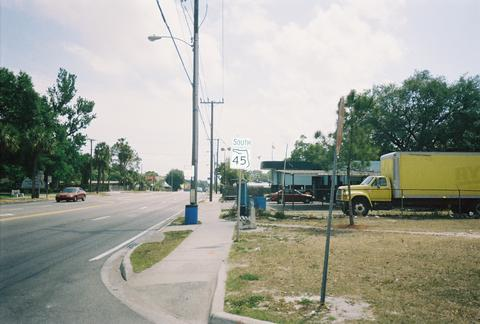
SR 45 in South Seminole Heights, Tampa, south of SR 574 (April 8, 2006)

South and east of Naples, US 41 turns eastward as SR 90 as the Tamiami Trail crosses the Everglades on its way to Miami; north of High Springs, US 41 overlaps US 441 until their split in Lake City (from there US 41 continues to the Georgia border with the hidden SR 25 designation).

== Major intersections ==
County	Location	mi	km	Destinations	Notes
Collier	Naples	0.000	0.000	US 41 south (5th Avenue South/SR 90 east) / 9th Street South – Downtown Naples, Historic District	Southern end of US 41 concurrency
See US 41 (mile 108.285-194.518)
Sarasota		86.233	138.779	US 41 north (SR 45A)	Northern end of US 41 concurrency; southern end of US 41 Bus. concurrency
Sarasota	See US 41 Bus. (mile 0.000-2.928)				
Sarasota	Venice	89.161	143.491	US 41 south (SR 45A)	Northern end of US 41 Bus. concurrency; southern end of US 41 concurrency
See US 41 (mile 197.486-224.481)
Manatee		116.156	186.935	US 41 north / SR 684 west (Cortez Road) – Beaches	Northern end of US 41 concurrency; southern end of US 41 Bus. concurrency
Manatee	See US 41 Bus. (mile 0.000-6.118)				
Manatee	Palmetto	122.274	196.781	US 41 south (SR 55) – Bradenton, Sarasota	Northern end of US 41 Bus. concurrency; southern end of US 41/SR 55 concurrency; interchange; southbound exit and northbound entrance
See US 41 (mile 230.923-262.409)
Hillsborough		153.760	247.453	US 41 north (South 50th Street/SR 599) / SR 676 east (Causeway Boulevard) – Tampa	Northern end of US 41 concurrency; southern end of US 41 Bus. concurrency
Hillsborough	See US 41 Bus. (mile 0.000-5.053)				
Hillsborough	Tampa	158.813	255.585	US 41 Bus. north / SR 60 west (Kennedy Boulevard) to I-275 / SR 618 west (Selmon Expressway) – St. Petersburg	Northern end of US 41 Bus./SR 60 concurrency
Hillsborough	Tampa	158.89	255.71	SR 618 east (Selmon Expressway) to I-75 – Brandon	SR 618 exit 8
Hillsborough	Tampa	160.968	259.053	SR 574 (Martin Luther King Jr. Boulevard)	
Hillsborough	Tampa	161.978	260.678	US 41 south / US 92 (Hillsborough Avenue/SR 600) to I-275	Southern end of US 41 concurrency
See US 41 (mile 270.301-408.870)
Alachua	High Springs	300.547	483.684	US 41 north / US 441 (East Santa Fe Boulevard/SR 25) / CR 236 east (North Main Street)	Northern end of US 41 concurrency
1.000 mi = 1.609 km; 1.000 km = 0.621 mi: Concurrency terminus

== State Road 45A ==
State Road 45A
- Location: Venice
- Length: 2.968 mi (4.777 km)

State Road 45A (SR 45A) is the Venice Bypass, a segment along US 41 east of Tamiami Trail in Venice, which was originally part of US 41 until 1965 when that segment was redesignated as Business US 41 after the Intracoastal Waterway (ICW) was dredged through Venice by the U.S. Army Corps of Engineers in 1964. The higwhay begins near Shamrock Boulevard in Venice Gardens and terminates at Venetia Bay Boulevard in the Eastgate section of Venice.
