= Lutz, Florida =

- Unincorporated Community
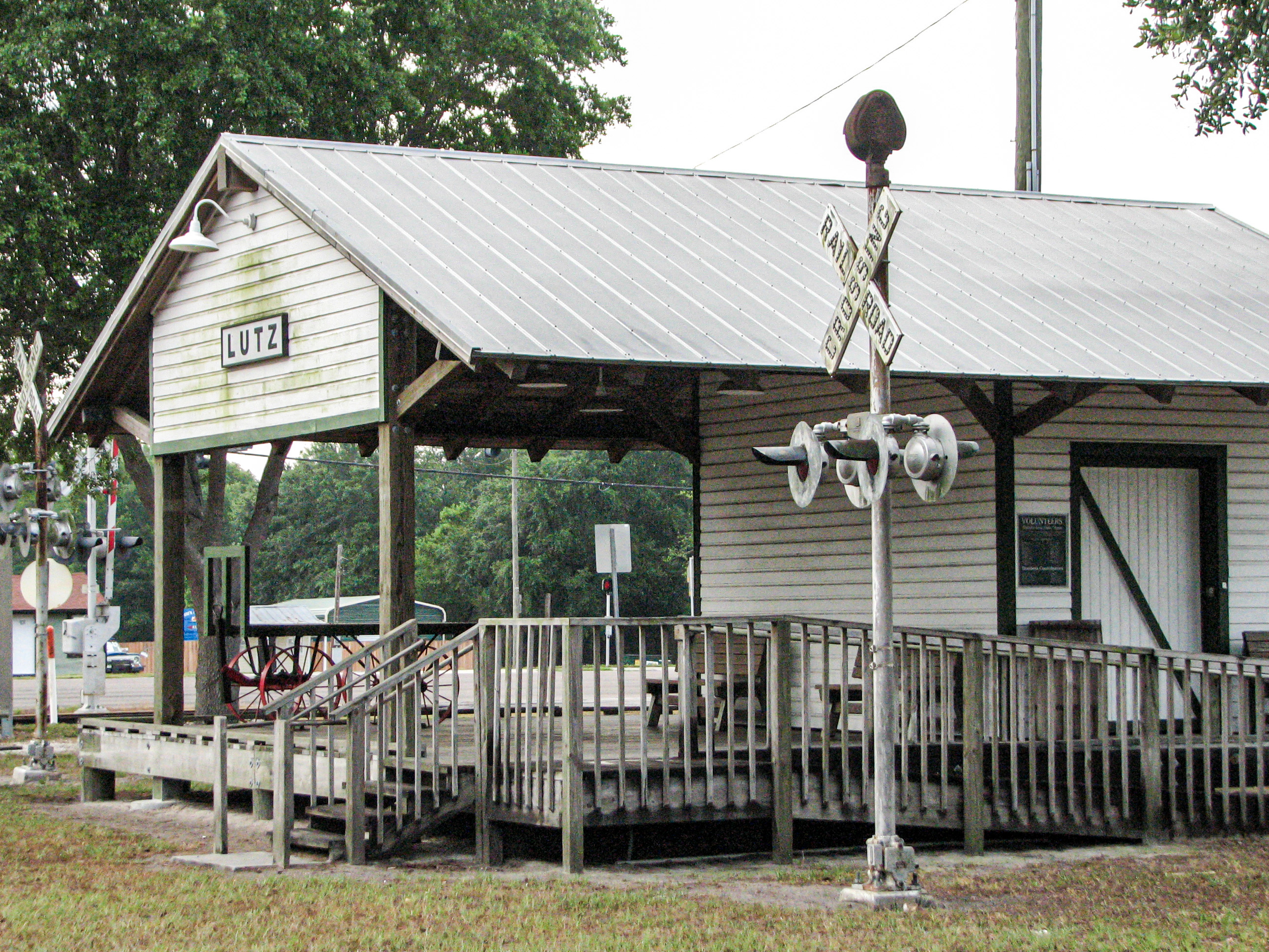
- Lutz Train Depot
- Nickname: "Cactus Hat"
- Location in Hillsborough County and the state of Florida
- Coordinates: 28°07′48″N 82°28′14″W
- Country: United States
- State: Florida
- County: Hillsborough, Pasco

Area
  - Total: 26.84 sq mi (69.51 km^{2})
  - Land: 24.43 sq mi (63.27 km^{2})
  - Water: 2.41 sq mi (6.24 km^{2})
- Elevation: 59 ft (18 m)

Population (2020)
  - Total: 23,707
  - Density: 970/sq mi (374.7/km^{2})
- Time zone: UTC-5 (Eastern (EST))
  - Summer (DST): UTC-4 (EDT)
- ZIP code(s): 33548, 33549, 33558, 33559
- Area code: 813
- FIPS code: 12-41775
- GNIS feature ID: 2403247

Lutz /ˈluːts/ is an unincorporated community in Hillsborough County and Pasco County, Florida, United States, 15 miles (24 km) north of Tampa. As of the 2020 census, Lutz had a population of 23,707.

While there is a census-designated area of Lutz, the community itself extends beyond those boundaries into other census-designated areas.

== History ==
Lutz began with the construction of a small train depot on the Tampa Northern Railroad. The area surrounding the depot officially became known as "Lutz" when the U.S. Postal Service authorized a post office. The community was named for W. P. Lutz, who was credited with bringing the railroad to town.

As people moved to the rural community from Tampa, the Lutz area continued to grow until it no longer depended on the "Lutz Junction", which was demolished in the late 1960s.

In 2000, a replica of the depot was rebuilt in the approximate location, which is now at the intersection of Lutz-Lake Fern Road and U.S. Highway 41. The post office's structure is still in the same place today, although it is now an art gallery. A public library is located behind the train depot replica. This area is known as "Beautiful Downtown Lutz" and had a song written about it in 1981.

Part of the movie Edward Scissorhands was filmed on Tinsmith Circle in the neighborhood of Carpenter's Run in north Lutz in Pasco County. In the credits the town is named in the "Thank you" section.

== Geography ==
Lutz is located in northwestern Hillsborough County and southern Pasco County. It is bordered to the northeast in Pasco County by Wesley Chapel and in Hillsborough County by a region of Tampa known as New Tampa, to the south by the Lake Magdalene and University unincorporated communities, and to the west by unincorporated Keystone in Hillsborough County and to. the northwest by Odessa in Pasco County. To the north, Lutz is bordered by Land o' Lakes and Wesley Chapel in Pasco County.

Interstate 275 runs through the east side of Lutz, joining its parent highway Interstate 75 in the northeast corner of the community. U.S. Route 41 runs through the center of Lutz, and Florida State Road 597 forms part of the western border. Downtown Tampa is 14 miles (23 km) to the south.

According to the United States Census Bureau, the Lutz CDP has a total area of 27.1 square miles (70.2 km^{2}), of which 24.6 square miles (63.8 km^{2}) are land and 2.5 square miles (6.4 km^{2}), or 9.06%, are water.

== ZIP codes ==
ZIP codes which serve Lutz and the surrounding areas are 33548, 33549, 33558 and 33559. These ZIP codes extend north past the Hillsborough County line to State Road 54 in unincorporated southern Pasco County. That area is also called Lutz, and often referred to as "Pasco Lutz" by residents and newspapers.

== Demographics ==
Historical population
Census	Pop.	Note	%±
1980	5,555		—
1990	10,552		90.0%
2000	17,081		61.9%
2010	19,344		13.2%
2020	23,707		22.6%
U.S. Decennial Census

=== 2020 census ===
As of the 2020 census, Lutz had a population of 23,707. The median age was 43.2 years. 22.3% of residents were under the age of 18 and 18.5% of residents were 65 years of age or older. For every 100 females there were 97.0 males, and for every 100 females age 18 and over there were 95.3 males age 18 and over.

93.1% of residents lived in urban areas, while 6.9% lived in rural areas.

There were 8,616 households in Lutz, of which 33.1% had children under the age of 18 living in them. Of all households, 60.9% were married-couple households, 14.4% were households with a male householder and no spouse or partner present, and 18.5% were households with a female householder and no spouse or partner present. About 18.3% of all households were made up of individuals and 7.6% had someone living alone who was 65 years of age or older.

There were 9,194 housing units, of which 6.3% were vacant. The homeowner vacancy rate was 2.1% and the rental vacancy rate was 12.3%.

Racial composition as of the 2020 census
Race	Number	Percent
White	17,124	72.2%
Black or African American	1,130	4.8%
American Indian and Alaska Native	72	0.3%
Asian	1,315	5.5%
Native Hawaiian and Other Pacific Islander	9	0.0%
Some other race	734	3.1%
Two or more races	3,323	14.0%
Hispanic or Latino (of any race)	4,132	17.4%

== Schools ==
Lutz is served by Hillsborough & Pasco County Public Schools through the following:

- Schwarzkopf Elementary School
- Lutz K-8
- Mckitrick Elementary School
- Bexley Elementary School
- Miles Elementary School
- Buchanan Middle School
- Martinez Middle School
- Walker Middle School
- Ben Hill K-8
- Maniscalco K-8
- Charles S. Rushe Middle School
- Freedom High School
- Gaither High School
- Steinbrenner High School
- Sickles High School
- Sunlake High School
