= State roads in Florida before 1945 =

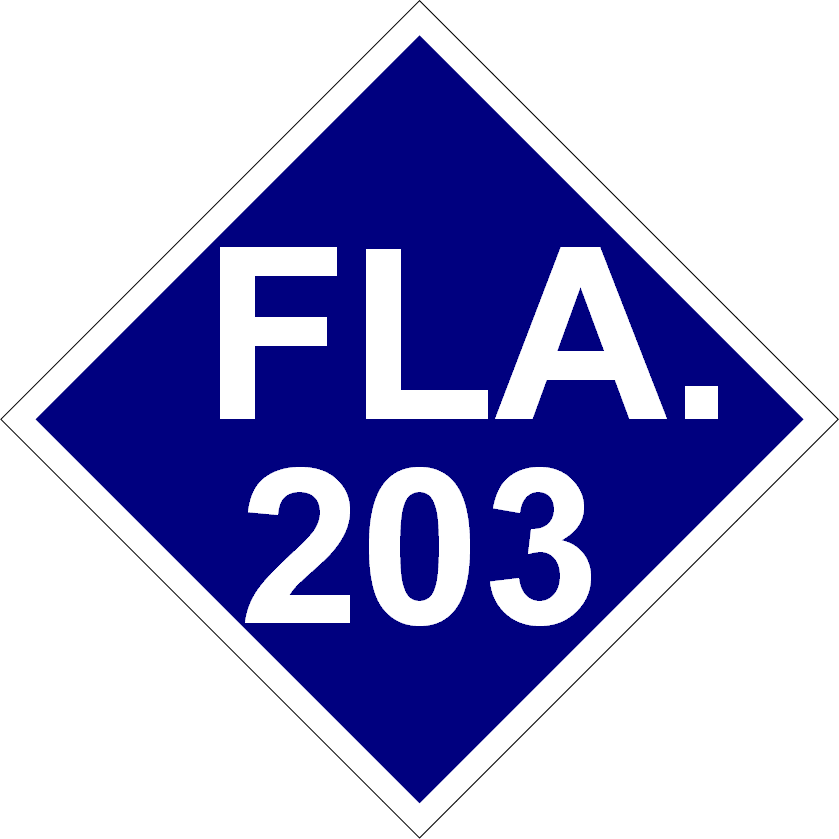
- Original State Road shield

System information
- Notes: State Roads are generally state-maintained.

Highway names
- Interstates: Interstate X (I-X)
- US Highways: U.S. Highway X (US X)
- State: State Road X (SR X)
- County: County Road X (CR X)

System links
- Florida State Highway System; Interstate; US; State; Former; Pre‑1945; Toll; Scenic

Before the 1945 Florida State Road renumbering, Florida had a system of numbered state roads administered by the State Road Department.

Beginning in 1923, the Florida Legislature added routes to the system by law, initially assigning numbers itself and later allowing the State Road Department to select them. Many routes had spurs and loops, and state road numbers continued to be posted even when routes were part of the U.S. Highway system. By 1939, numbering had reached State Road 545 (SR 545). Numerous additional roads, including many minor routes, were added to the state system in 1941, although not all were numbered; by 1945, the numbering had reached at least SR 625. A 1941 law authorized a renumbering, but implementation was delayed by World War II until 1945.

== History ==
The State Road Department (SRD) published official road maps biennially as early as 1917. In 1923, the Florida State Legislature began writing the routes into law. Every two years, when the legislature met, new roads were added, at first by number, and later, giving the SRD the ability to choose a number. Many routes, specifically SR 2, had not only a main route, but spurs and loops to different places. These were mostly caused by the legislature. Even when a road was also a U.S. Highway, the State Road number was signed.

Up to and including 1939, every road written into law by the legislature was given a number by the SRD. This included the range from SR 397 to SR 449, which included most of the 1926 Bond Issue Roads in Orange County and some other major roads. The 1939 numbering ended with SR 545; 546 to 549 were skipped.

In 1941, many laws were passed assigning not only the main roads, as had been done in Orange County, but also many minor roads to the State Road System in many counties. FDOT did not give all these numbers. Information about which were assigned is sparse. Very few roads were added in 1943 and 1945 due to World War II; the system got to at least SR 625. A state law passed in 1941 authorized a renumbering; this didn't happen until 1945, due to the war.

== See also ==
- 1945 Florida State Road renumbering
- List of state roads in Florida (post-1945)
