= Florida State Road 60 =

Highway in Florida, United States

State Road 60
- SR 60 highlighted in red

Route information
- Maintained by FDOT
- Length: 161.336 mi (259.645 km)
- Existed: 1945 renumbering–present

Major junctions
- West end: CR 245 in Clearwater Beach
- US 19 in Clearwater; I-275 in Tampa; US 41 in Tampa; I-75 in Brandon; US 17 / US 98 in Bartow; US 27 in Lake Wales; Florida's Turnpike / US 441 at Yeehaw Junction; I-95 near Fellsmere; US 1 in Vero Beach
- East end: SR A1A in Vero Beach

Location
- Country: United States
- State: Florida
- Counties: Pinellas, Hillsborough, Polk, Osceola, Indian River

Highway system
- Florida State Highway System; Interstate; US; State; Former; Pre‑1945; Toll; Scenic
← SR 59	→ SR 61

State Road 60 (SR 60) is an east–west route transversing Florida from the Gulf of Mexico to the Atlantic Ocean. The western terminus of SR 60 is at the Sunsets at Pier 60 site in Clearwater Beach. The eastern terminus is in Vero Beach near the Atlantic Coast just past State Road A1A.

== Route description ==
=== Clearwater through Tampa ===
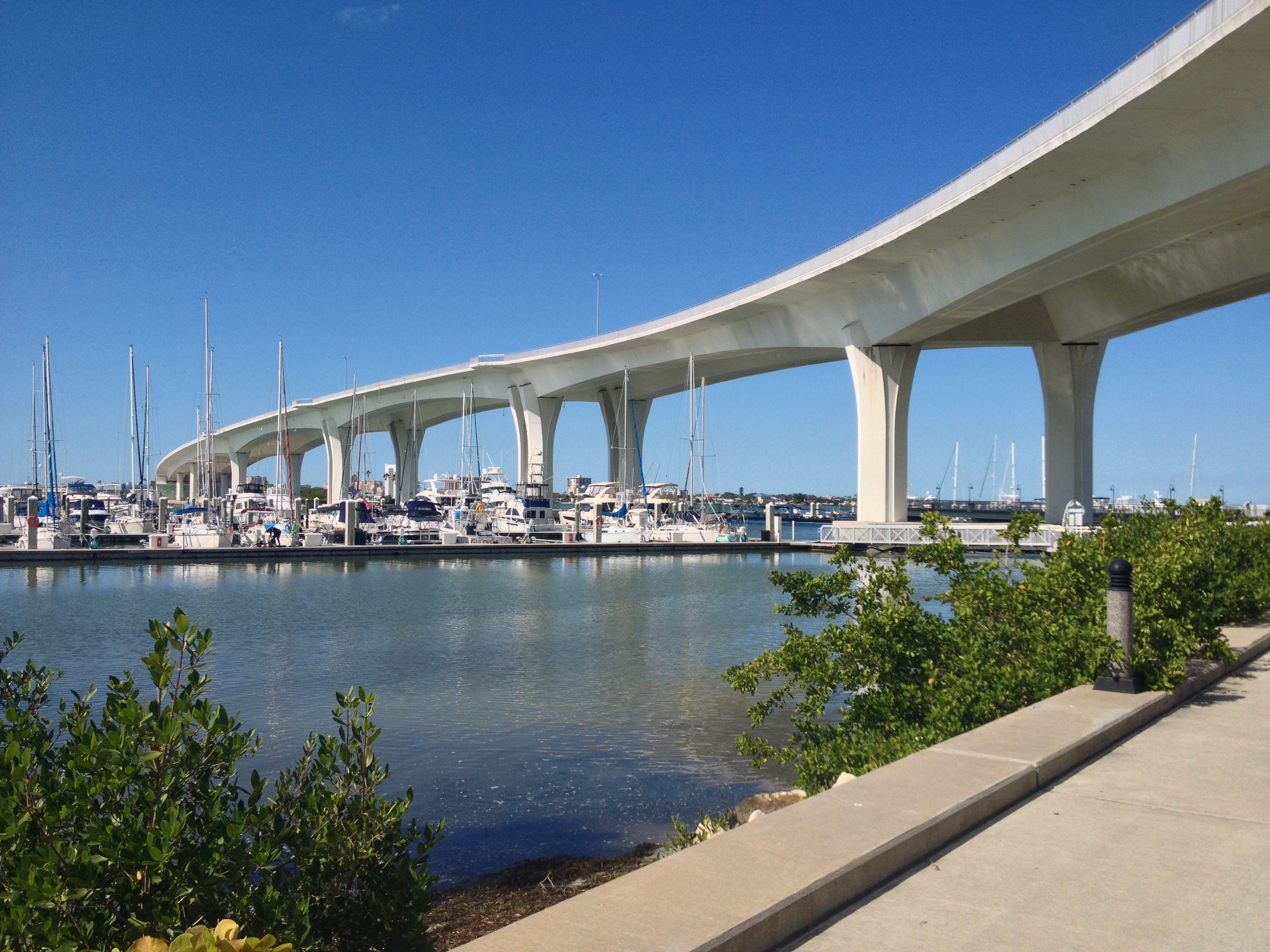
Clearwater Memorial Causeway Bridge viewed from the southeast corner of the bridge

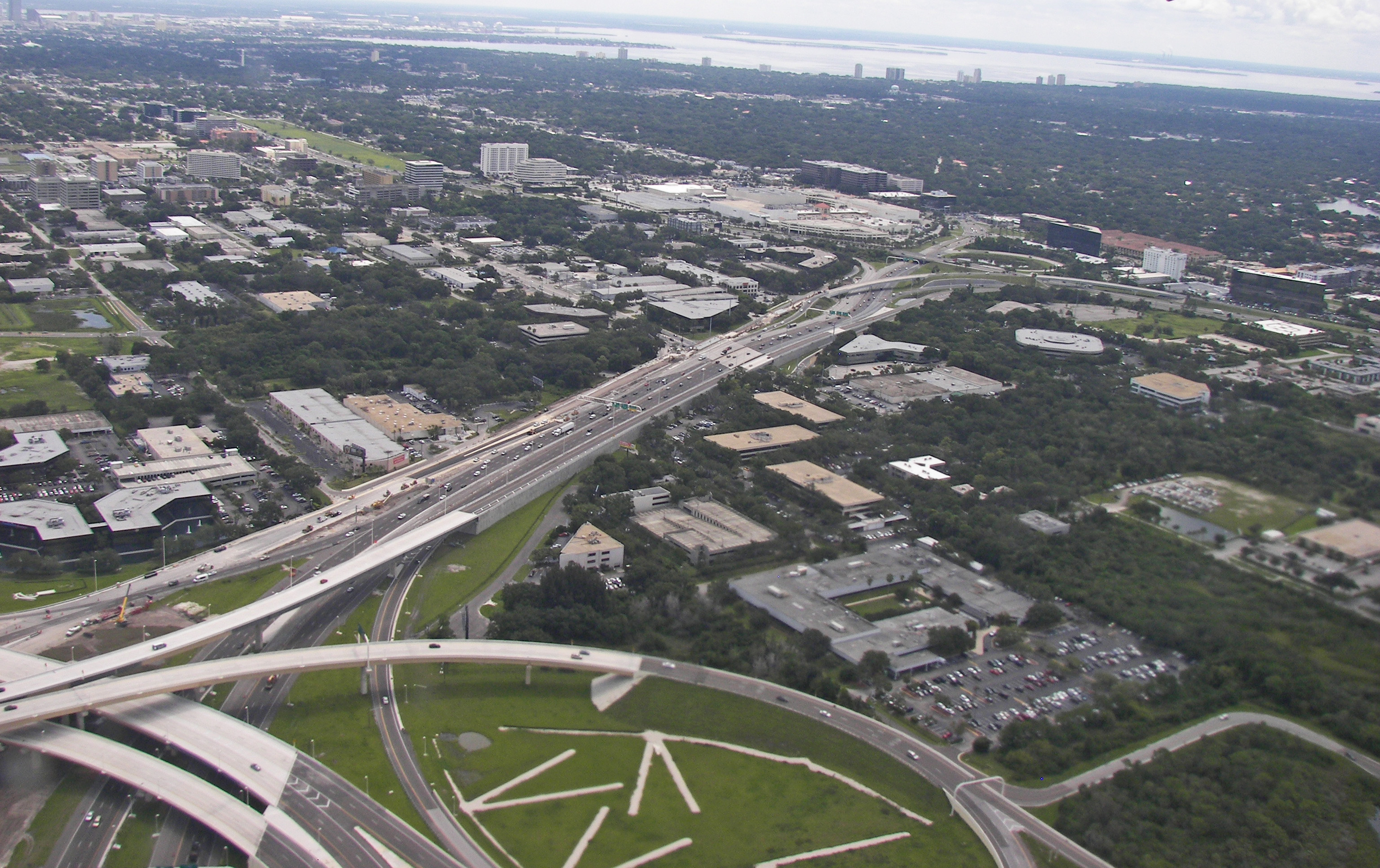
SR60 between the Florida State Road 616/Tampa International Airport interchange (bottom left) and Interstate 275 (upper right)

SR 60 begins in Clearwater Beach, at the once controversial Clearwater Roundabout, which is also shared by Coronado Drive, Poinsettia Avenue and Mandalay Avenue. The route is primarily a four lane divided highway named Causeway Boulevard. This segment includes the Clearwater Bridge over the Mandalay Channel which leads to a man-made island containing only one intersection with Island Way, which leads to Pasadees Key and Big Mangrove Key, the former of which is where the Clearwater Marine Aquarium can be found. Before the man-made island ends, SR 60 rises above the Intracoastal Waterway along the Clearwater Memorial Causeway to reach mainland Clearwater. Once on the mainland, the road divides into Court Street (one-way westbound) and Chestnut Street (one-way eastbound) between Bay Avenue and Ewing Avenue. Along the way, both streets intersect the Pinellas Trail and the CSX Clearwater Subdivision at the same time along East Street. One block later, the streets are joined by US 19 Alternate at Myrtle Avenue, and are overlapped through the end of the one-way pair west of MLK Avenue where the routes only run along Court Street. The overlap with US Alternate 19, ends as it turns south at Missouri Avenue (hidden SR 651), while SR 60 continues east until reaching the intersection of South Highland Avenue, where hidden SR 651 terminates. From there the route also joins Gulf-to-Bay Boulevard.

Throughout Clearwater, Gulf-to-Bay Boulevard serves as a long, straight west-to-east commercial strip, with notable intersections at Keene Road, later Belcher Road, and then Old Coachman Road and a power line crossing. The first interchange along the route is with US 19 which is the first Single-Point Urban Interchange in the United States. Another SPUI interchange follows with County Road 611, which consists of McMullen-Booth Boulevard and the Bayside Bridge. The last intersection in mainland Pinellas County is South Bayshore Drive, before the road becomes the Courtney Campbell Causeway over Tampa Bay to Memorial Highway, the eastern terminus of the causeway, and the southern terminus of SR 589 (Veterans Expressway) in Tampa. The road runs along a reverse J hook around Runway 19R of the Tampa International Airport into the airport interchange which includes SR 616 (Spruce Street) to US 92 in Westshore, and the George L. Bean Parkway to the airport.

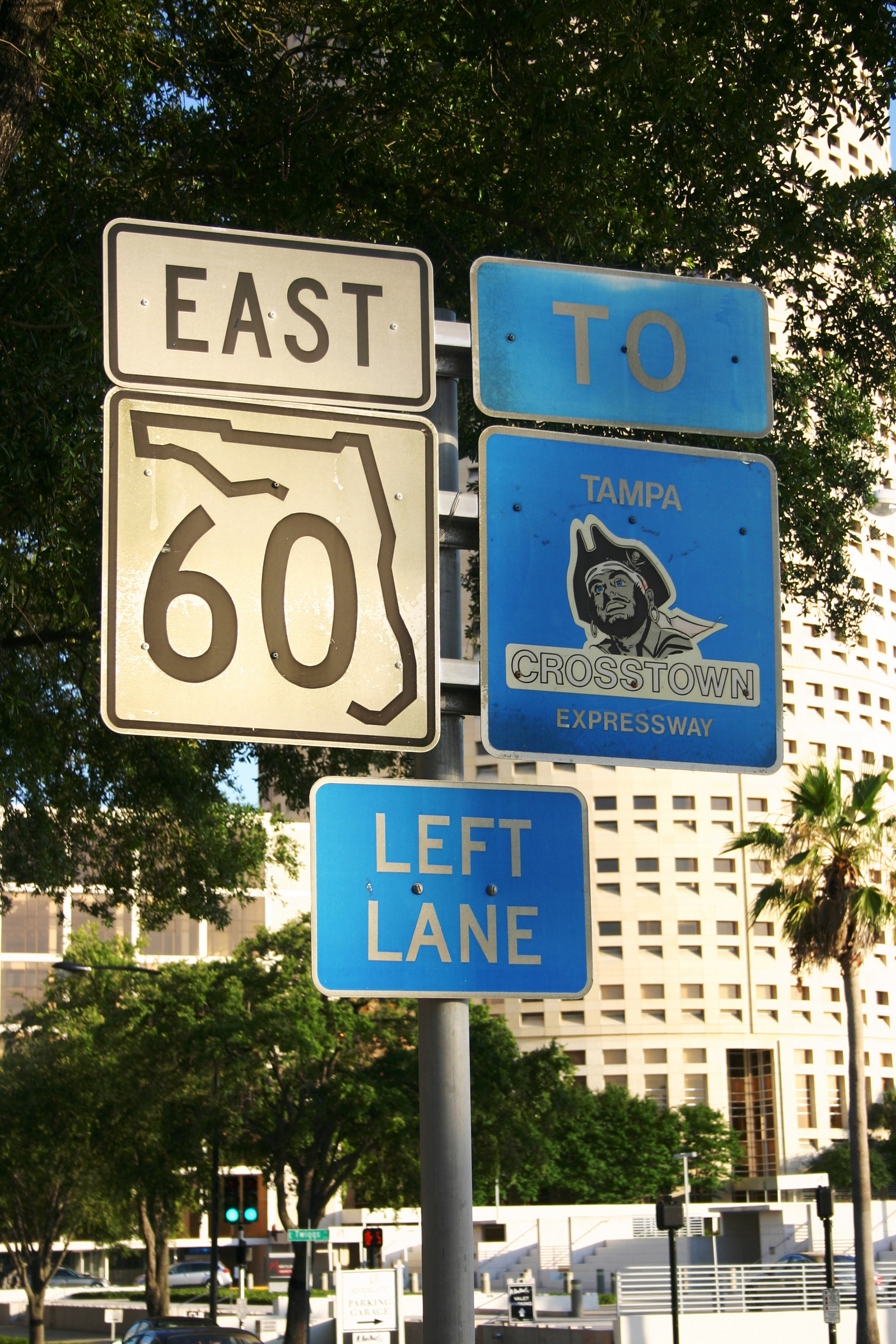
A Florida State Road 60 sign on Kennedy Boulevard in Tampa, with an older Crosstown Expressway sign alongside.

Memorial Highway ends at the interchange with I-275, but SR 60 turns east along John F. Kennedy Boulevard (originally Grand Central Avenue), thus becoming the main non-limited access route from downtown Tampa to Brandon, as it passes WestShore Plaza. As it was in Clearwater, SR 60/Kennedy Boulevard serves as a commercial strip within western Tampa. Notable exceptions are sites such as the American Legion Cemetery just before the intersection with U.S. Route 92 at Dale Mabry Highway. Diagonally across from WTVT (Fox-13 TV station), the road intersects Florida State Road 685 (Henderson Boulevard). Few realize that beyond Henderson, SR 685 continues in a hidden overlap with SR 60. One of the more unique intersections is with Willow Avenue which also has a railroad crossing with the CSX Port Tampa Spur from the southwest to northeast corners. Beginning at "Boulevard" SR 60 enters the territory of the University of Tampa. At Snow Park, Kennedy Boulevard branches off to the northeast while Grand Central Avenue continues straight east. From there, the route passes by the Henry B. Plant Museum just before crossing the Kennedy Boulevard Drawbridge over the Hillsborough River. Originally known as the Lafayette Street Drawbridge, the bridge was added to the National Register of Historic Places on February 20, 2018.

Immediately after crossing the Hillsborough River, eastbound SR 60 turns south for one block along Ashley Drive, then turns back east again along Jackson Street. Merely one block later the route is joined in another overlap with southbound US Business Route 41 at the intersection with North Tampa Street. Northbound US Bus 41 can be accessed two blocks later at North Florida Avenue when it leaves Kennedy Boulevard a block north, taking hidden SR 685 with it to Lutz.

Just before leaving downtown Tampa, SR 60/US Bus 41 runs beneath the Lee Roy Selmon Expressway (westbound only Exit 8) and is joined by southbound Florida State Road 45 at Brush Street, while northbound SR 45 is encountered at Nebraska Avenue. The one-way pair in Tampa ends when eastbound SR 60/45/US Bus 41 turns north onto Meridian Avenue and east onto Kennedy Boulevard. Three blocks later the routes end at Channelside Drive then turn north along that street until the intersection with Adamo Drive where they turn east. From there it continues paralleling the Lee Roy Selmon Expressway, and is surrounded by more industrial zoning.

Southbound US Bus 41/SR 45 leaves SR 60 at 21st Street, while northbound US Bus 41/SR 45 joins SR 60 at 22nd Street. SR 60 continues to run in close proximity to the Lee Roy Selmon Expressway. East of US Bus 41, the route runs under the southern terminus of the Interstate 4 Connector with no connecting ramps, then has a major intersection with US 41 (50th Street) followed by driveways to the CSX Uceta Yard. The US 41 intersection marks the northern terminus of the Tamiami Trail, which encompasses the southernmost 284 miles (457 km) of US 41 down towards Miami. The industrial development continues as the road runs along a bridge over the Tampa Bypass Canal then intersects South 78th Street (CR 573), which includes part of another interchange with Lee Roy Selmon Expressway on the southeast corner.

=== Brandon through Polk County ===
Within the vicinity of the intersection with US 301, SR 60 makes the transition into Brandon where the route approaches a parclo interchange with Interstate 75 at exit 257 and Adamo Drive changes its name to Brandon Boulevard. The zoning gradually transitions from industrial to mainstream commercial, most notably at the northwest entrance to the Brandon Town Center. Brandon Boulevard ends at Mount Carmel Road, but the route continues eastward simply as "State Road 60." Between Valrico Road and Miller Road, SR 60 runs along the Brandon-Valrico border, fully entering Valrico at the intersection of Miller Road. Between Saint Cloud Avenue and Skywood Drive, SR 60 has a railroad crossing with the CSX Valrico Subdivision, although a local street to a gated community near the tracks is named "Valrico Station Road," suggesting the historic presence of a former railroad station. Just outside of the border of Valrico, is a local preserve area named the Sydney Dover Conservation Park, which includes the Dover Horse Trails.

In Hopewell, south of Plant City, the route is locally named Hopewell Road, even though it is still signed as S.R. 60. The major intersection in Hopewell is the southern terminus of Florida State Road 39 and northern terminus of Hillsborough County Road 39. East of the intersection is the Hopewell Weigh Station, located in the median. Following the weigh station, SR 60 encounters a railroad crossing with the CSX Plant City Subdivision. The route begins curving to the southeast as it enters Bealsville then turns east again as it crosses the wetlands of the English River, and shortly after it intersects South County Line Road at the Hillsborough-Polk County Line only to return to the southeast as it approaches the South Lakeland Airstrip. Along this second southeast trajectory it crosses a pair of bridges over Poley Creek, continuing the name of "SR 60." The road intersects with an old alignment of the highway that is aptly named "Old Highway 60", Bailey Road, and Shady Hammock Road in a 5-way intersection just before Mulberry city limits, just before crossing the bridges over the North Prong of the Alafia River. At the intersection with the east end of Polk County Road 676 and Old Highway 60, current SR 60 has a railroad crossing with the CSX Mulberry Yard, then the road turns east again at another segment of Old Highway 60. At the intersection with Prairie Mine and Diesel Roads, SR 60 is named West Canal Street. The road encounters a local street named Phosphate Boulevard which flanks the west side of the crossing with the Bone Valley Subdivision, and then intersects Florida State Road 37. West Canal Street becomes East Canal Street one block later at the intersection with Northeast and Southeast First Avenue. The name Canal Street terminates at Kid Ellis Road and SR 60 resumes signage east of Mulberry.

Beyond the Mulberry City Limits, the road is scattered with various construction, chemical, and mining equipment companies. The road takes a brief northeast bend after it approaches a railroad crossing with a spur leading to some phosphate mines owned by Mosaic. Similar scattered businesses continue along the road with the addition of a TECO Substation on the south side and an FDOT building on the north side. East of these two structures, the road edges at a southeast angle where the presence of construction and chemical companies begins to diminish (though not necessarily disappear) as it approaches the second crossing of the Valrico Subdivision.

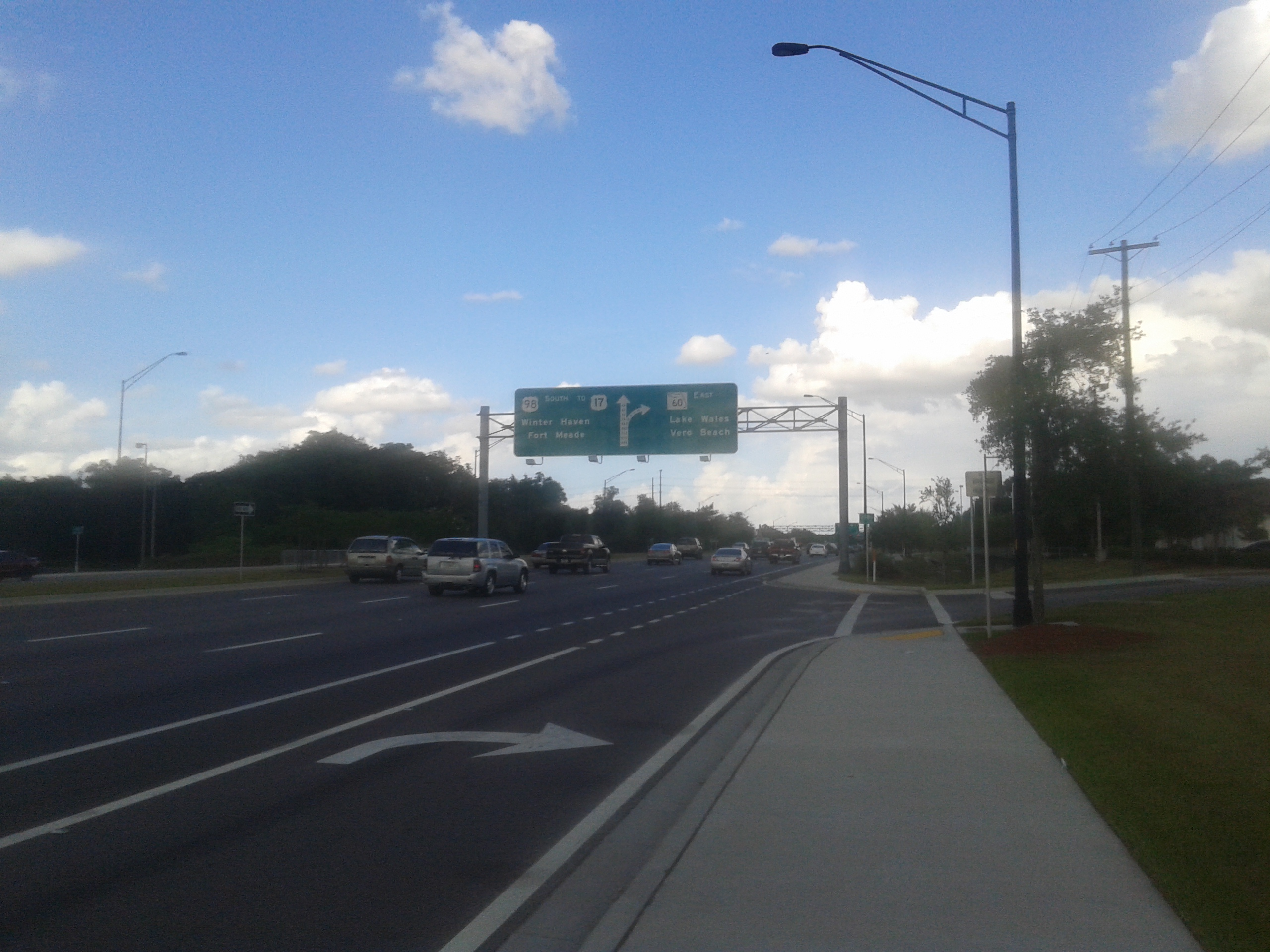
Concurrent US98/SR60 (eastbound) in Bartow approaching their split

The road gains the name West Main Street west of Bartow city limits, but then moves northeast onto North Van Fleet Drive between West Main Street runs straight east into downtown Bartow. North Van Fleet Drive runs along a bridge over the Valrico Subdivision, then as it descends it curves straight east again where it becomes West Van Fleet Drive. The transition from West to East Van Fleet Drive occurs when SR 60 encounters the intersection with U.S. Route 98 in Florida (Broadway Avenue and hidden SRs 35 and 700). US 98 and SR 35 join SR 60 in a short overlap while SR 700 continues south along Broadway Avenue to East Main Street. Just after crossing the Fort Fraser Trail, the overlap with US 98/SR 35 ends when SR 60 moves onto a new alignment onto East Van Fleet Drive, then runs over a bridge below the US 17-98 overlap. East Van Fleet Drive continues to the Peace River Bridges. From east of Bartow the road is simply called SR 60. A few small businesses dot the road as it starts to take a few more curves to the northeast. One other site includes the TECO Peace Creek Solar Plant. An intersection that would otherwise be unimportant is Enterprise Boulevard, a small road leading to the Polk State College - Clear Springs Advanced Technology Center. One of the more significant intersections along this segment is with Polk County Road 655A southeast to Alturas then moves around the north coast of Lake Garfield, where it encounters the intersection of Polk County Road 655 north to US 17 and the southern terminus of Florida State Road 655 in Eloise. East of the vicinity of the lake is a share intersection between Old Bartow-Lake Wales Road which leads to Polk County Road 653 and the northeast end of Polk County Road 655A, and after this the route runs southeast again.

Still not able to remove itself from its not too urban surroundings and features, the road's barren scenery is interrupted by the crossing of the CSX Auburndale Subdivision, which is frequently used by Amtrak's Silver Star and Silver Meteor lines. Attempting to move to the northeast one last time before turning back southeast, the landscape is slightly more developed, and it encounters the road to Lake Wales Municipal Airport. However, it doesn't officially enter the City of Lake Wales itself until another railroad crossing, this time with the Lake Wales Branch of the Florida Midland Railroad. The Lake Wales city line is where the name changes to West Polk Avenue. Curving to southeast and east again, it encounters a single-point urban interchange with US 27. Until 2024, the interchange was a parclo interchange before being converted by the Florida Department of Transportation. SR 60 leaves West Polk Avenue and moves southeast onto Hesperides Road in eastern Lake Wales. The road turns straight east at South Second Street, and then runs along a pair of bridges over SR 17 (5th Street), Florida Midland Railroad tracks, and 4th Street. Access to SR 17 is only available through the aforementioned West Polk Avenue continuation from eastbound SR 60 and a half-diamond interchange with 4th Street from westbound SR 60.

=== East of Lake Wales ===
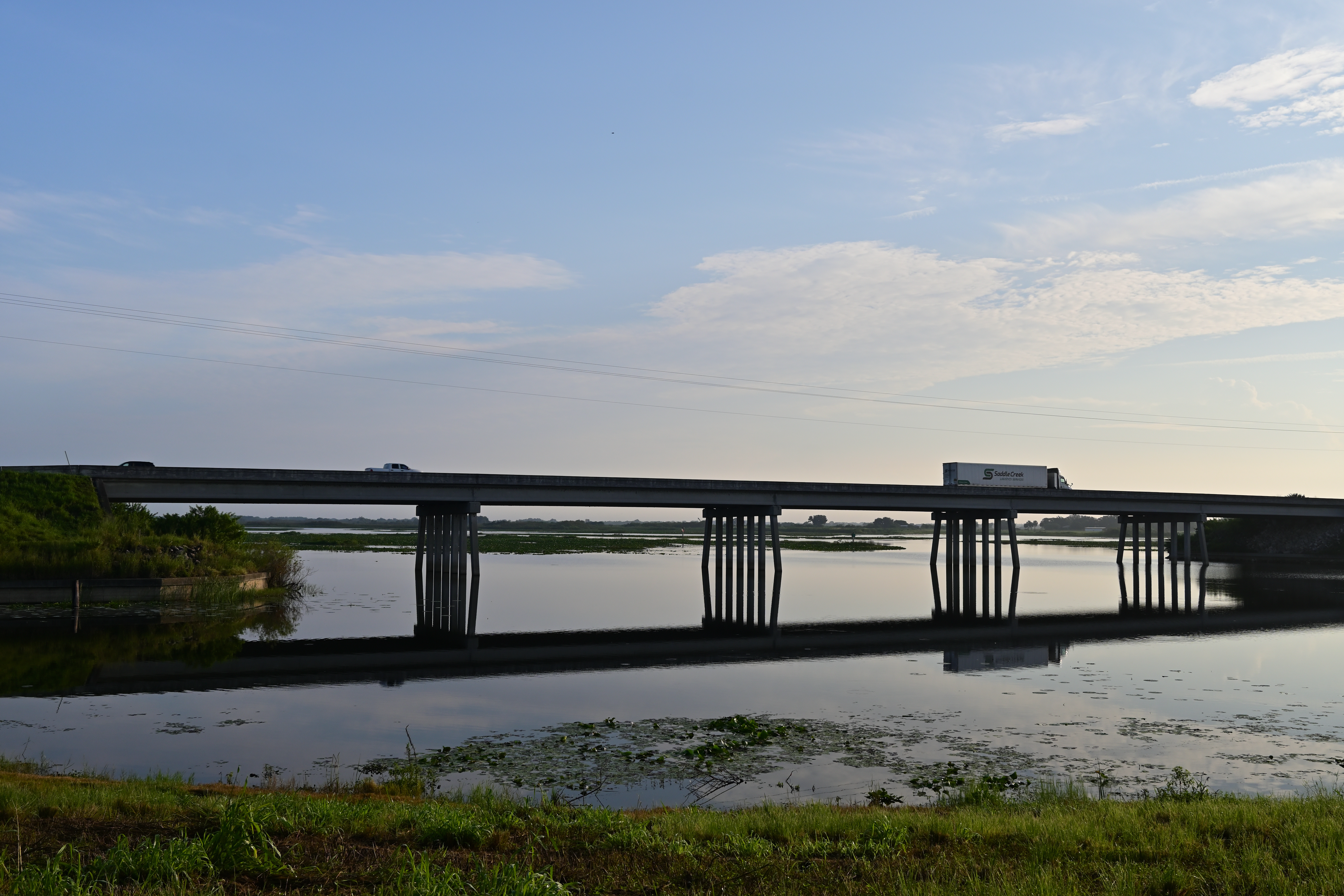
Crossing the Kissimmee River at the southern edge of Lake Kissimmee, between Polk (left) and Osceola (right) Counties

The name Hesperides Road continues into County Road 630 near Indian Lake Estates. From there it is a two-lane road, however the road briefly becomes wider at locations such as Robert's Ranch, Grape Hammock Road and the KICCO (Kissimmee Island Cattle Company) Wildlife Management Area The road is joined by the Florida National Scenic Trail just before the bridge and dam over the Kissimmee River, where it crosses the Polk-Osceola County Line. From there the road curves southeast again, and the trail leaves SR 60 at an intersection with a dirt road leading to the Three Lakes Wildlife Management Area. Very little exists beyond this point besides farms and scrubland.

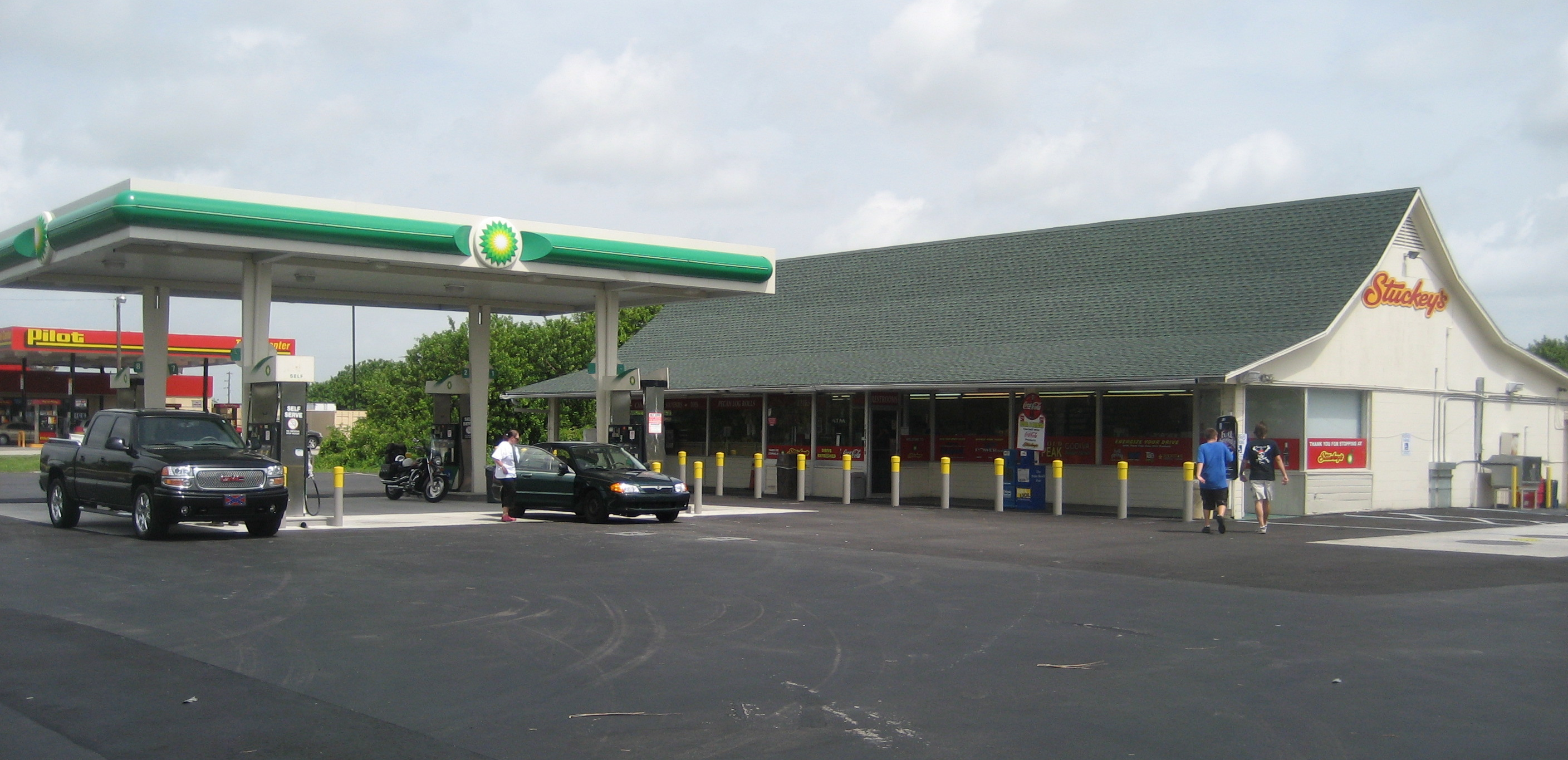
Stuckey's/BP in Yeehaw Junction, Florida, with a Pilot station in the background. These are the only gas stations for 60 miles (97 km) westbound towards Lake Wales and Tampa and 25 miles (40 km) eastbound towards Vero Beach.

Still rural, the route enters Yeehaw Junction where it encounters US 441 and the historic site of the former Desert Inn and Restaurant, until it was destroyed by a jackknifing tractor-trailer in 2019. East of US 441, the road is upgraded again at the interchange Florida's Turnpike and resumes its status as a four-lane divided highway. Additionally, it receives the street name Stan Mayfield Memorial Highway, a name that it will continue to possess even as it crosses the Osceola-Indian River County Line. Entering the county, the road briefly turns east then southeast again after the north gate of Wedgworth Farms, only to turn east again at the Fort Drum Marsh, where it runs between the Blue Cypress Conservation Area and Fort Drum Wildlife Management Area. Beyond these two preserves, the road is surrounded mostly by sod farms, with a brief interruption known as the intersection with Indian River County Road 512, a county road leading to Sebastian. Further east, it passes by a historical marker at the site of Fort Vinton in the eastbound lanes. The area becomes more developed as it approaches Interstate 95 at Exit 147 in West Vero Corridor. The street name is changed to Richard Raczkoski Memorial Highway from I-95 to 43rd Avenue, though it still signed as 20th Street. It is at 43rd Street east of the bridge over the Main Canal where SR 60 officially enters the City of Vero Beach.

Before the intersection with 20th Avenue, SR 60 divides into the last one-way pair. It becomes 19th Place (one-way eastbound) and 20th Street (one-way westbound). The two streets run parallel to each other through the railroad crossing of the Florida East Coast Railway Main Line. Running parallel to this line is Commerce Avenue where eastbound 19th Place becomes 20th Street (one-way eastbound) and 20th Place (one-way westbound). Five blocks later in intersects US 1 at Eighth Avenue. The one-way pair finally comes to and end on 20th Street just west of the intersection with Sixth Avenue. 20th Street ends at Indian River Boulevard and continues eastbound onto a dead-end street named Tarpon Road, but SR 60 turns north along Indian River Boulevard (CR 603).

Even without the cosigning with SR 60, Indian River Boulevard is a four-lane divided highway. Here the route is flanked by a tree-obstructed frontage road for a boat channel-lined community on the east side, and condominiums apartments on the west side until the second crossing of the main canal, where the surroundings become more natural. The route leaves Indian River Boulevard to turn east again at the road leading to the Merrill P. Barber Bridge. The bridge climbs above marshland on the mainland before passing over the Indian River then lands on Orchid Island. At the first intersection with Indian River Drive East and Riverside Park Drive, the street is named Beachland Boulevard, a four-lane tree-lined often divided highway with provisions for left-turn lanes. On the first block after this intersection, SR 60 is flanked by the Beachland Elementary School along the north side to Mockingbird Drive, and the Riverside Theater along the south side. The rest of the boulevard appears to be typical land-boom era development. Florida State Road 60's eastern terminus is at Florida State Road A1A. Beachland Boulevard continues east of SR A1A as a four-lane divided city street until Ocean Boulevard, where it becomes a loop entrance and exit to Sexton Plaza Beach.

=== Local street names for SR 60 ===
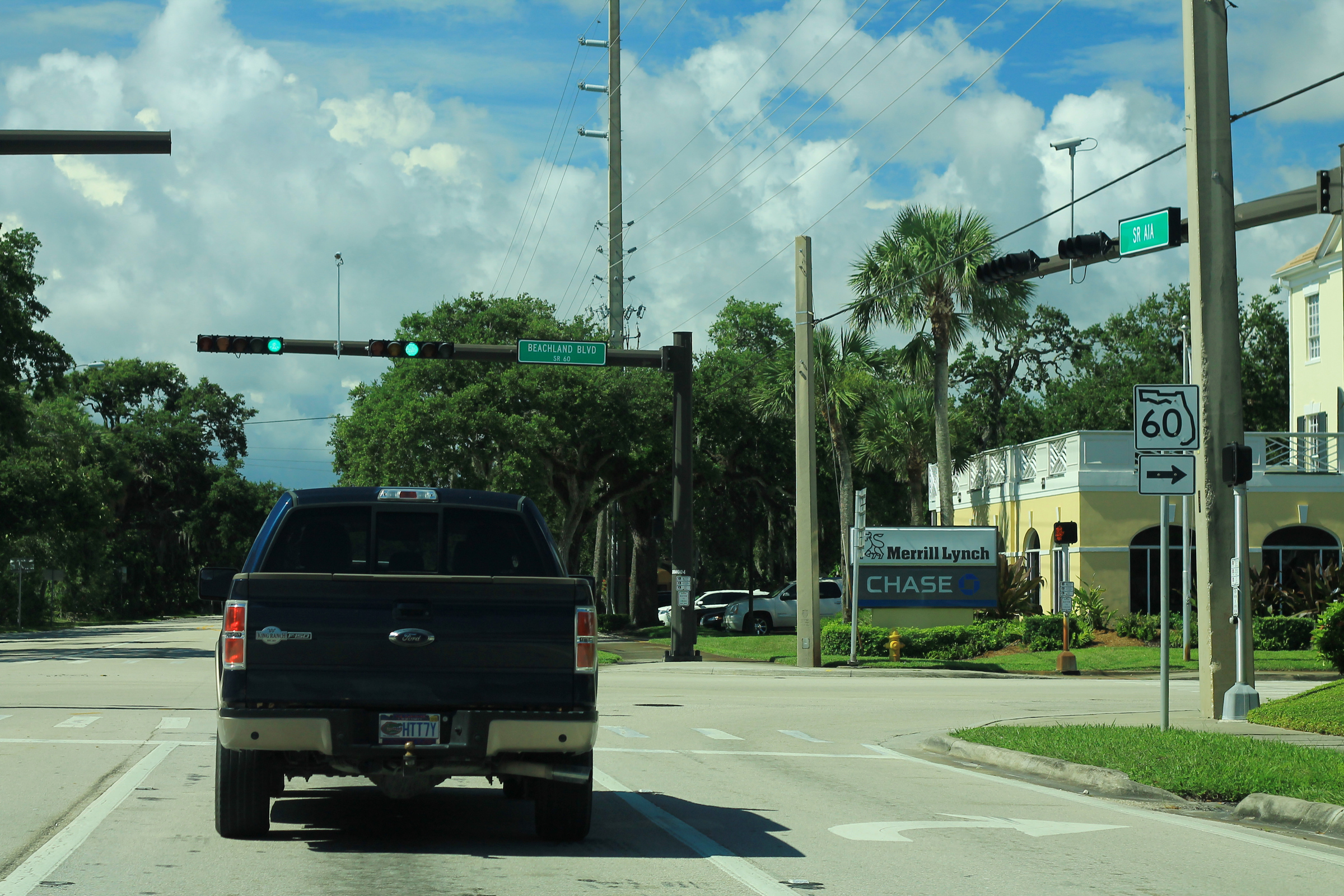
The eastern terminus of Florida State Road 60 is located on State Road A1A.

From west to east:

- Causeway Boulevard from the roundabout with Coronado Drive and Poinsettia Avenue and Mandalay Avenue on Clearwater Beach to causeway.
- Memorial Causeway on causeway between Clearwater Beach and mainland Clearwater.
- SR 60 divides into Court Street (one-way westbound) and Chestnut Street (one-way eastbound) between Bay Ave and Ewing Ave.
- Court Street from Ewing Ave to S Highland Ave.
- Gulf-to-Bay Boulevard from S Highland Avenue to Tampa Bay.
- Courtney Campbell Causeway over Tampa Bay to Memorial Highway, the eastern terminus of Courtney Campbell Causeway in Tampa
- Memorial Highway from the eastern terminus of Courtney Campbell Causeway to junction I-275
- John F. Kennedy Boulevard from I-275 to Channelside Drive. (Cosigned with Business U.S. Highway 41 most of that section)
- Channelside Drive until junction Adamo Drive.
- Adamo Drive until junction with Interstate 75.
- Brandon Boulevard from I-75 until Mount Carmel Road.
- SR 60 to Plant City.
- Hopewell Road in Plant City, resumes SR 60 east of Plant City.
- Simply signed SR 60 from there until reaching Mulberry city limits.
- Canal Street in Mulberry, resumes SR 60 signage east of Mulberry.
- West Main Street west of Bartow city limits.
- Van Fleet Drive between West Main Street in Bartow, to the Peace River Bridges.
- From east of Bartow to Lake Wales is simply called SR 60. In Lake Wales it is called West Polk, although it changes to Hesperides Road in eastern Lake Wales and east of the city.
- Simply signed SR 60 until Interstate 95.
- Stan Mayfield Memorial Highway from the Florida Turnpike to I-95.
- Richard Raczkoski Memorial Highway from I-95 to 43rd Avenue.
- 20th Street in Vero Beach from Interstate 95 to 20th Avenue.
- 19th Place (one-way eastbound) and 20th Street (one-way westbound) in Vero Beach from east of 20th Avenue until Commerce Avenue.
- 20th Street (one-way eastbound) and 20th Place (one-way westbound) in Vero Beach from east of Commerce Avenue to west of 6th Avenue.
- 20th Street from west of 6th Avenue in Vero Beach to Indian River Blvd.
- Cosigned with Indian River Blvd until Merrill P. Barber Bridge.
- Merrill P. Barber Bridge over the Indian River.
- Beachland Boulevard after bridge until eastern terminus at State Road A1A.

== History ==
=== Early years ===
The route of SR 60 was originally designated as SR 73 from Tampa to present-day CR 630 (known then as SR 30) in eastern Polk County. The remainder of the route from there to Vero Beach was designated as part of SR 30.

The Davis Causeway (known today as the Courtney Campbell Causeway) opened in 1934 providing a more direct route between Tampa and Clearwater. The causeway was built as a toll road and was not initially part of the state highway system. The State Road Department purchased the causeway in 1944 bringing it under state control.

After the 1945 Florida state road renumbering, the full route from Clearwater Beach to Vero Beach was designated as SR 60.

=== Tampa realignments ===
Originally, Adamo Drive in Tampa ended at 22nd Avenue just east of downtown. At this point, SR 60 turned north along 22nd Avenue to East 7th Avenue in Ybor City. It then ran east along 7th Avenue and Broadway Avenue before turning southeast along present-day Tampa East Boulevard and Old Hopewell Road. It reconnected with the current route about half a mile west of Falkenburg Road. Adamo Drive was extended east to its full length in the early 1950s, and SR 60 was rerouted onto Adamo Drive upon its opening in 1954. Adamo Drive is named for Dr. Francisco "Frank" Adamo, a local physician and World War II veteran.

The current alignment of SR 60 southwest of Tampa International Airport was built in the 1960s. The realignment allowed for the construction of the airport's Runway 1L/19R.

=== Bartow realignment ===
SR 60 originally ran through Downtown Bartow along Main Street and Flamingo Drive. In the late 1950s, a bypass was built around Downtown Bartow to the north. The bypass, known as Van Fleet Drive, was initially designated as SR 60A. Van Fleet Drive was named for James Van Fleet, a local veteran of World War I, World War II, and the Korean War.

SR 60 was later rerouted to Van Fleet Drive, and the original route was designated as SR 60 Business. The SR 60 Business designation was decommissioned in 2004 when Main Street and Flamingo Drive were relinquished to city control.

=== Lake Wales realignment ===
Originally, SR 60 ran east through Lake Wales along Polk Avenue. After crossing SR 17 and passing under the Atlantic Coast Line Railroad's Haines City Branch (the present-day Florida Midland Railroad), SR 60 turned southeast along 4th Street and rejoined the current route at Hesperides Road. SR 60 was realigned to its current route in the 1960s.

=== Clearwater realignment ===
Originally, SR 60 in Clearwater traveled west of Highland Avenue along Gulf-to-Bay Boulevard and Cleveland Street to the Memorial Causeway. When construction of the new Memorial Causeway began in 2001/2002, SR 60 was realigned along Court Street and Pierce Boulevard to the Causeway, with the original alignment downloaded to the city of Clearwater. Between Pierce and Martin Luther King Jr. Boulevard, SR 60 is split into two one-way streets—Court Street carrying westbound traffic, and Chestnut Street carrying eastbound traffic.

Prior to the realignment, Court Street east of Missouri Avenue was known as SR 651, while Court and Chestnut Streets west of Missouri was a locally maintained road signed as "Bypass 60".

== Major intersections ==
County	Location	mi	km	Destinations	Notes
Pinellas	Clearwater	−0.14	−0.23	CR 245 south (Coronado Drive, Mandalay Drive, Poinsettia Avenue) - Marina, Sand Key	traffic circle
Pinellas	Clearwater	0.000	0.000	west end of state maintenance at base of Clearwater Harbor Channel bridge	
Pinellas	Clearwater	0.447	0.719	Island Way - Clearwater Marine Aquarium	
Pinellas	Clearwater	1.195– 1.634	1.923– 2.630	Clearwater Memorial Causeway over Clearwater Harbor (Gulf Intracoastal Waterway)	
Pinellas	Clearwater	1.971	3.172	CR 321 south (South Fort Harrison Avenue)	former US 19 Alt. / SR 595
Pinellas	Clearwater	2.221	3.574	US 19 Alt. north (South Myrtle Avenue / SR 595)	west end of US 19 Alt. / SR 595 overlap
Pinellas	Clearwater	2.725	4.385	US 19 Alt. south (South Missouri Avenue / SR 595 / SR 651)	east end of US 19 Alt. / SR 595 overlap; west end of SR 651 overlap
Pinellas	Clearwater	3.482	5.604	CR 375 (South Highland Avenue / Gulf to Bay Boulevard) – Downtown Clearwater	former SR 60 west; east end of SR 651 overlap; no left turn any direction
Pinellas	Clearwater	3.734	6.009	Lake Drive (CR 385)	
Pinellas	Clearwater	4.243	6.828	CR 1 (Keene Road)	
Pinellas	Clearwater	4.752	7.648	South Hercules Avenue (CR 425)	
Pinellas	Clearwater	5.262	8.468	CR 501 (South Belcher Road)	
Pinellas	Clearwater	6.002	9.659	Old Coachman Road (CR 535 north)	
Pinellas	Clearwater	6.261	10.076	US 19 (SR 55) – St. Petersburg, Tarpon Springs	SPUI interchange
Pinellas	Clearwater	7.55	12.15	CR 611 (McMullen Booth Road / Bayside Bridge) – St. Petersburg, Safety Harbor, Ruth Eckerd Hall, St. Petersburg-Clearwater International Airport	SPUI interchange
Old Tampa Bay		12.406– 13.023	19.966– 20.958	Courtney Campbell Causeway	
Hillsborough	Tampa	17.265	27.785	Bayport Drive	interchange
Hillsborough	Tampa	17.539	28.226	SR 589 (Veterans Expressway) / Independence Parkway	interchange; Independence Parkway (exit 2B) only has access from SR 60 west and to SR 60 east; SR 60 westbound follows exit 2A from nascent SR 589 north; west end of SR 589 overlap
Hillsborough	Tampa	17.539	28.226	CR 576 (Memorial Highway) / Eisenhower Boulevard – Air Cargo	interchange; signed as exit 3; exit is combined with SR 589 in both directions
Hillsborough	Tampa	18.397	29.607	SR 616 east (Spruce Street) – Raymond James Stadium	interchange; no eastbound entrance; signed eastbound as exit 1B
Hillsborough	Tampa	18.418	29.641	Tampa International Airport	interchange; signed eastbound as exit 1A
Hillsborough	Tampa	19.058	30.671	I-275 south (SR 93) – St. Petersburg	interchange; eastbound exit and westbound entrance; I-275 exit 39
Hillsborough	Tampa	19.228	30.944	I-275 north (SR 93) to I-4 – Tampa	interchange; eastbound exit and westbound entrance; I-275 exit 39
Hillsborough	Tampa	19.404	31.228	To I-275 south / Kennedy Boulevard – St. Petersburg	I-275 exit 39; east end of SR 589 overlap
Hillsborough	Tampa	19.757	31.796	CR 587 (South West Shore Boulevard) to I-275 north	
Hillsborough	Tampa	20.897	33.630	US 92 (South Dale Mabry Highway / SR 600)	
Hillsborough	Tampa	21.511	34.619	SR 685 south (Henderson Boulevard)	west end of SR 685 overlap
Hillsborough	Tampa	23.639	38.043	Kennedy Boulevard Bridge over Hillsborough River	
Hillsborough	Tampa	23.725	38.182	To I-275 / I-4 / Ashley Street North	
Hillsborough	Tampa	23.944	38.534	US 41 Bus. north (Florida Avenue North / SR 685) to I-4 / I-275	east end of SR 685 overlap; west end of US 41 Bus. overlap
Hillsborough	Tampa	24.160	38.882	To SR 618 (Selmon Expressway) / I-4 east / I-275 north / Jefferson Street North – Brandon, St. Petersburg	
Hillsborough	Tampa	24.388	39.249	SR 45 north (Nebraska Avenue) to SR 618 east (Selmon Expressway Local Lanes)	west end of SR 45 overlap
Hillsborough	Tampa	24.459	39.363	Meridian Avenue	
Hillsborough	Tampa	24.518	39.458	To SR 618A east (Selmon Expressway Express Lanes) / Meridian Avenue – Brandon	
Hillsborough	Tampa	25.703	41.365	US 41 Bus. south (21st Street / SR 45) to SR 618 – Port Cargo, Ferry Terminal 7	east end of US 41 Bus. / SR 45 overlap
Hillsborough	Tampa	25.761	41.458	22nd Street north	former SR 585 north
Hillsborough	Tampa	26.961	43.390	SR 569 north (North 39th Street) to I-4	
Hillsborough	Tampa	27.862	44.840	US 41 (50th Street / SR 599) to I-4 – Temple Terrace, Gibsonton	northern terminus of Tamiami Trail
Hillsborough	Palm River	29.860	48.055	South 78th Street (CR 573 south)	
Hillsborough	Palm River	29.983	48.253	SR 618 west (Selmon Expressway)	SR 618 exit 12
Hillsborough	South Tampa	30.809	49.582	US 301 (SR 43) – Zephyrhills, Riverview	
Hillsborough	Brandon	32.47	52.26	I-75 (SR 93A) to SR 618 (Selmon Expressway) – Naples, Ocala, Tampa	I-75 exit 257
Hillsborough	Brandon	33.697	54.230	To SR 618 west (Selmon Expressway) / South Lakewood Drive (SR 618A west) – Brandon Town Center	
Hillsborough	Brandon	35.467	57.079	Lithia Pinecrest Road (CR 640 east)	
Hillsborough	Hopewell	45.256	72.832	SR 39 north (James L. Redman Parkway) / CR 39 south – Plant City, Pinecrest, Alafia River State Park	
Polk	Mulberry	53.751	86.504	CR 676 west (Nichols Road) – Nichols	
Polk	Mulberry	55.317	89.024	SR 37 (Church Avenue) to SR 570 (Polk Parkway) – Lakeland, Bradley Junction	
Polk	Bartow	62.397	100.418	CR 555 south	
Polk	Bartow	62.733	100.959	Main Street	former SR 60 Bus. east
Polk	Bartow	63.591	102.340	US 98 north (Broadway Avenue / SR 35 / SR 700 north) to SR 570 (Polk Parkway) – Lakeland, downtown Bartow, Historic District	west end of US 98 / SR 700 overlap
Polk	Bartow	64.204	103.326	US 98 south (East Van Fleet Drive / SR 700) to US 17 (SR 555) – Winter Haven, Fort Meade	east end of US 98 / SR 700 overlap
Polk	Bartow	65.100	104.768	Flamingo Drive - Historic District	former SR 60 Bus. west
Polk		68.781	110.692	CR 655A south (80 Foot Road)	
Polk		71.030	114.312	CR 655 north (Rifle Range Road)	
Polk		71.538	115.129	CR 655A south (Alturas Road North) – Alturas	
Polk		75.899	122.148	West Lake Wales Road South - West Lake Wales	
Polk	Lake Wales	79.11	127.32	US 27 (SR 25) to I-4 – Haines City, Avon Park, Legoland	SPUI interchange
Polk	Lake Wales	79.593	128.093	To SR 17 / Polk Avenue (CR 60A east)	
Polk	Lake Wales	80.45	129.47	To SR 17 / Hesperides Road (CR 60A west) – Historic District	interchange; westbound exit and eastbound entrance
Polk	Lake Wales	81.380	130.968	CR 17B south (11th Street)	west end of CR 17B overlap
Polk	Lake Wales	81.912	131.825	CR 17B north (Buck Moore Road) – Bok Tower Gardens	east end of CR 17B overlap
Polk	Hesperides	88.615	142.612	Boy Scout Camp Road / Walk-in-Water Road - Lake Kissimmee State Park	
Polk		90.424	145.523	Doherty Drive - Nalcrest, Lakeshore	
Polk	Indian Lake Estates	98.684	158.817	CR 630 west – Frostproof, Lake Wales Ridge State Forest	
Osceola	Yeehaw Junction	125.457	201.903	US 441 (SR 15) – Holopaw, Okeechobee	
Osceola	Yeehaw Junction	126.09	202.92	Florida's Turnpike (SR 91) – Orlando, Miami	Turnpike exit 193
Indian River		142.776	229.776	CR 512 east	
Indian River	West Vero Corridor	150.47	242.16	I-95 (SR 9) – Daytona Beach, West Palm Beach, Fort Pierce	I-95 exit 147
Indian River	West Vero Corridor	151.819	244.329	82nd Avenue (CR 619)	
Indian River	West Vero Corridor	153.816	247.543	66th Avenue (CR 615)	
Indian River	West Vero Corridor	154.839	249.189	58th Avenue (CR 613)	
Indian River	Vero Beach	155.839	250.799	CR 611 (43rd Avenue)	
Indian River	Vero Beach	156.852	252.429	27th Avenue	former SR 607 south
Indian River	Vero Beach	157.774	253.913	Old Dixie Highway (CR 605 south)	
Indian River	Vero Beach	158.362	254.859	US 1 (SR 5) – McKee Botanical Garden	
Indian River	Vero Beach	158.916	255.751	CR 603 south to SR A1A	west end of CR 603 overlap
Indian River	Vero Beach	159.892	257.321	CR 603 north (Indian River Blvd) – Cleveland Clinic Indian River Hospital	east end of CR 603 overlap
Indian River	Vero Beach	160.062– 160.749	257.595– 258.700	Merrill P. Barber Bridge over Indian River (Atlantic Intracoastal Waterway)	
Indian River	Vero Beach	161.336	259.645	SR A1A / Beachland Boulevard – Business District	
1.000 mi = 1.609 km; 1.000 km = 0.621 mi: Concurrency terminus

== Related routes ==
=== State Road 60A ===
State Road 60A
- Location: Bartow

State Road 60A served as a bypass for Bartow, Florida, until SR 60 was realigned to follow that route in 2006. It is briefly cosigned with US 98 during its route. It is mainly known as Van Fleet Drive.

=== State Road 60 Business ===
State Road 60 Business
- Location: Bartow

State Road 60 Business served as a business route for Bartow, Florida, until SR 60 was realigned to follow the bypass in 2006. It was briefly cosigned with SR 700 between Broadway and Holland Parkway (US 17/98). It was mainly known as Main Street and Flamingo Drive.

== See also ==
- Conners Highway
