= X49 =

X49 or X-49 may refer to:

- X49, airport code for South Lakeland Airport
- X-49, a fictional robot assassin in the animated series Samurai Jack
- Piasecki X-49 SpeedHawk, an experimental compound helicopter
