= Lakeshore, Florida =

- Unincorporated community
- Location within Florida Location within the United States
- Coordinates: 27°51′26″N 81°24′45″W
- Country: United States
- State: Florida
- County: Polk
- Elevation: 66 ft (20 m)
- Time zone: UTC-5 (Eastern (EST))
  - Summer (DST): UTC-4 (EDT)
- ZIP code: 33854
- Area code: 863
- GNIS feature ID: 282405

Lakeshore, formerly known as Fedhaven, is an unincorporated community in Polk County, Florida, United States. Lakeshore is located in eastern Polk County, 1 mile (1.6 km) east of Nalcrest and 11 miles (18 km) east-southeast of Lake Wales. The community was established in the 1960s as a retirement community for former federal employees, and was thus named Fedhaven; when the land was later sold to private ownership, its name was changed to Lakeshore. Lakeshore has a post office with ZIP code 33854; Fedhaven and Lake Wales are both considered alternate addresses for the community. In 2004, three hurricanes severely damaged Lakeshore.
