= Polk County, Florida =

- County
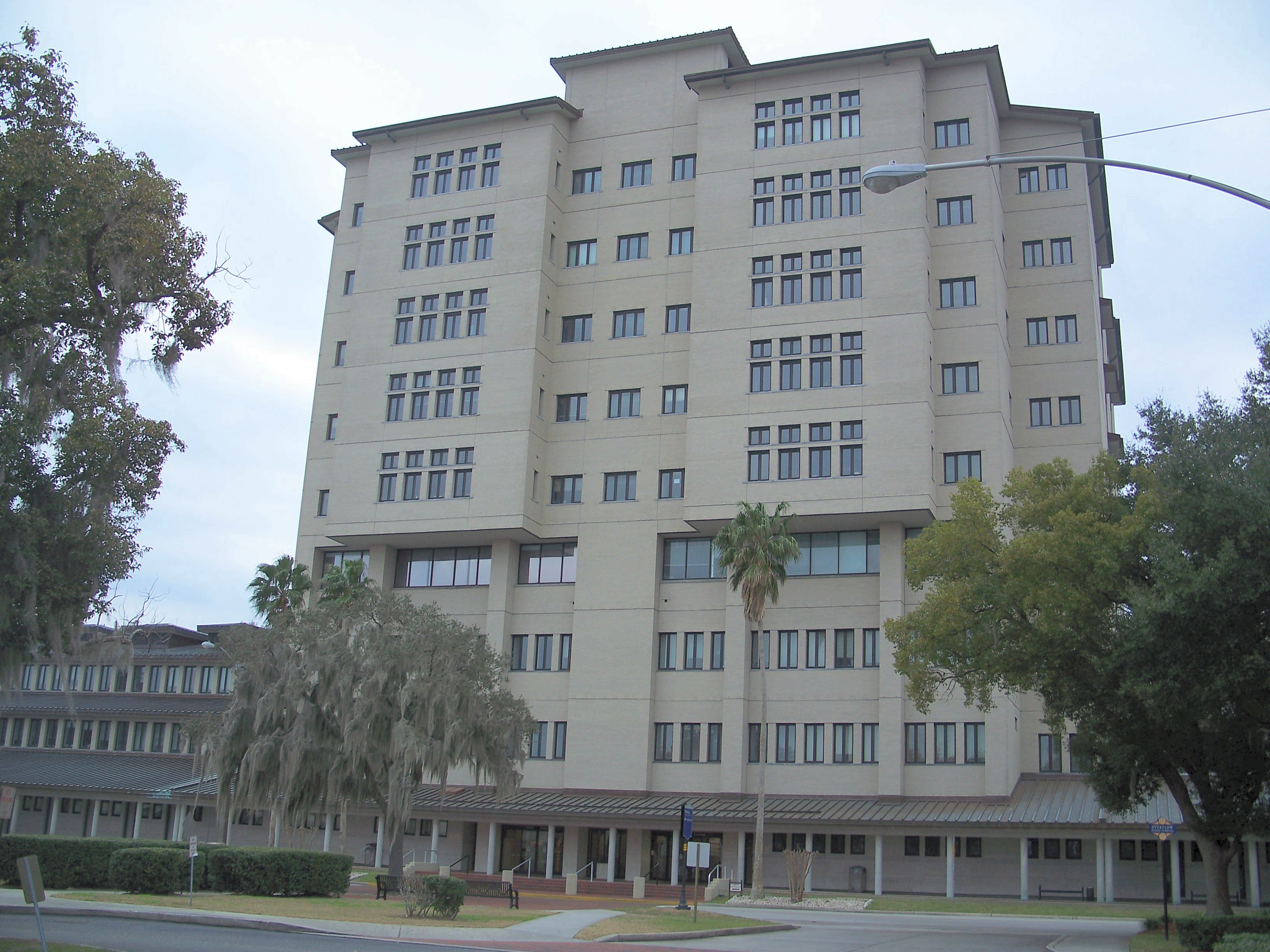
- The Polk County Courthouse in Bartow

- Flag Seal Logo

- Location within the U.S. state of Florida
- Coordinates: 27°58′N 81°42′W
- Country: United States
- State: Florida
- Founded: February 8, 1861
- Named for: James K. Polk
- Seat: Bartow
- Largest city: Lakeland

Area
  - Total: 2,011 sq mi (5,210 km^{2})
  - Land: 1,798 sq mi (4,660 km^{2})
  - Water: 213 sq mi (550 km^{2}) 10.6%

Population (2020)
  - Total: 725,046
  - Estimate (2025): 874,790 ▲
  - Density: 403.3/sq mi (155.7/km^{2})
- Time zone: UTC−5 (Eastern)
  - Summer (DST): UTC−4 (EDT)
- Area code: 863
- Congressional districts: 9th, 11th, 15th, 18th
- Website: www.polkfl.gov

Polk County (/poʊk/) is located in the central portion of the U.S. state of Florida. The county population was 725,046 in the 2020 census, and was estimated to be 818,330 in July 2023. Its county seat is Bartow, and its largest city is Lakeland. Polk County comprises the Lakeland–Winter Haven metropolitan statistical area (MSA). This MSA is the 77th-most populous one and the 89th-most populous primary statistical area of the United States as of July 1, 2012.

The center of Florida's population is located in Polk County, near the city of Lake Wales. Polk County is home to one public university, one state college, and four private universities.

The county is sometimes included in definitions of the Tampa Bay area, and Lakeland has close historical and economic ties to Tampa, though eastern parts of Polk County are more closely oriented toward the Orlando metropolitan area.

== History ==
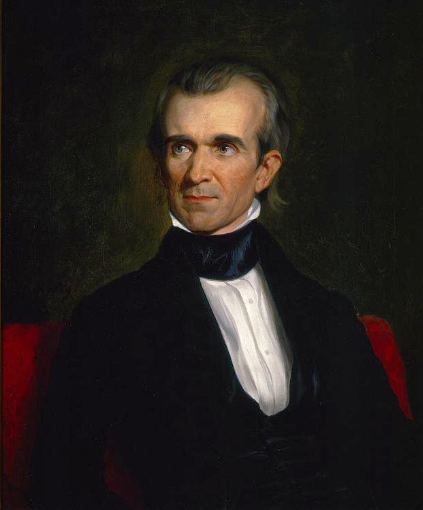
U.S. President James Knox Polk, namesake of the county

=== Early history ===
The first people to inhabit the area now called Polk County were the Paleoindians who arrived in Florida at least 12,000 years ago, late in the last ice age. With large amounts of water locked up in continental ice caps, the sea level was more than 150 feet (46 m) lower than at present. The Florida peninsula was twice as wide as it is today, and Florida was cooler and much drier, with few, if any, flowing rivers. Both animals and humans were dependent on scattered water holes, such as sinkholes, deep holes in otherwise dry river beds, and rain-fed lakes perched on impervious clay. Most Paleoindian campsites found in Florida have been found at water holes. The largest collection of late, more than 9,500 years ago, Paleoindian microlithic tools known from Florida were found in Lake Weohyakapka, near Nalcrest in Polk County.

As sea levels rose and Florida became warmer and wetter, the Paleoindian period was followed by the Archaic period, which ended 2,500 to 3,000 years ago, with the emergence of recognizable archaeological cultures in Florida. In eastern Polk County, the Kissimmee River valley was occupied by people of the Belle Glade culture, which persisted from about 3,000 years ago until the collapse of the Native American population in Florida after 1700. Native American people in western Polk County were part of, or influenced by, the Manasota culture, which flourished from 2,500 years ago until around 800 AD, when it was replaced by the Safety Harbor culture, from circa 800 until after 1700. The Peace River valley may have hosted a distinct culture during the Safety Harbor period.

In 1539, Hernando de Soto sent a detachment of between 80 and 180 men of his expedition, from his landing place on Tampa Bay across northern Polk County to visit Urriparacoxi, a powerful chief based in southern Lake County or eastern Orange County. For the next 280 years, the Spanish, and, between 1763 and 1783, the British, ruled Florida, but did not venture into the interior of the Florida peninsula south of the Oklawaha River valley, Acuera Province. The indigenous peoples of the Florida peninsula declined in numbers, and the people who became known as the Seminole moved into central Florida.

=== United States control ===
In 1821, Florida became a U.S. territory as a result of the Adams-Onis Treaty. In 1823, the Treaty of Moultrie Creek created a reservation in central Florida for the Seminoles and other Native Americans in Florida. What is now Polk County was within the boundaries of that reservation. An attempt to remove all Native Americans in Florida to west of the Mississippi River, starting in 1832, led to the Second Seminole War. Most of the fighting in the early years of the war occurred north of Polk County.

By 1837, the Seminoles were being pushed south. Late that year, Colonel Zachary Taylor, as part of a coordinated push against the Seminoles, led a column east from Fort Brooke (today's Tampa) into what is now Polk County, and then south between the Kissimmee and Peace River valleys, culminating in the Battle of Lake Okeechobee. By 1843 the few Seminoles remaining in Florida were confined to an informal reservation in southern Florida.

While Florida gained statehood in 1845, Polk County was created a month after Florida had seceded from the Union. It was formed from the eastern part of Hillsborough County and named in honor of former US President James K. Polk, who had been popular with Southerners for supporting the expansion of slavery and whose 1845 inauguration was on the day after Florida became a state.

Following the Civil War, the county commission established the county seat on 120 acres (0.49 km^{2}) donated in the central part of the county. Bartow, the county seat, was named after Francis S. Bartow, a Confederate colonel from Georgia, who was the first Confederate brigade commander to die in battle. Colonel Bartow was buried in Savannah, Georgia, with military honors, and promoted posthumously to the rank of brigadier general. The original name of the town was Fort Blount.

Several other towns and counties in the South changed their names to Bartow to honor the brigade commander. The first courthouse built in Bartow was constructed in 1867. It was replaced twice, in 1884 and in 1908. As the third courthouse to stand on the site, the present structure houses the Polk County Historical Museum and Genealogical Library. After the Civil War, some 400 Confederate veterans settled here with families before the end of the century.

=== Post-Reconstruction era to World War II ===
In 1883, in the post-Reconstruction period, black railway workers were among the first African Americans to settle in Polk County, south of Lake Wire. In 1884, they founded St. John's Baptist Church, which also served as the first school for freedmen's children. Other workers arrived for jobs in the phosphate industry. This area became the center of a predominately African-American community later known as Moorehead, after Rev. H.K. Moorehead, called to St. John's in 1906. The community developed its own businesses, professional class, and cultural institutions. Its students had to go to other cities for high school until 1928, when the first upper school to serve blacks was established here.

Fred Rochelle, 16, was burned alive in a public spectacle lynching before thousands in Polk County, Florida, in 1901.

White violence rose against blacks in the late 19th century in a regionwide effort to establish and maintain white supremacy as Southern states disenfranchised most blacks and imposed Jim Crow. Whites lynched 20 African Americans in Polk County from 1895 to 1921. Three black men, whose names were not recorded, were murdered in a mass lynching on May 25, 1895, accused of rape. While others were killed for alleged crimes (never proven), one black man was lynched for supposedly insulting a white woman. The man, Henry Scott, was a porter on a train from Lakeland to Bartow. While he was preparing a berth for one woman on May 20, 1920, another white woman became angry that he made her wait. She sent a telegram to the next station where he was met by a sheriff, arrested, and then turned over to a mob that shot him 40-50 times. Columbia County had 20 such lynching murders. These two counties had the second-highest total of lynchings of African Americans of any county in Florida.

In the first few decades of the 1900s, thousands of acres of land around Bartow were purchased by the phosphate industry. The county seat became the hub of the largest phosphate industry in the United States, attracting both immigrants and African-American and white workers from rural areas.

Polk County was the leading citrus county in the United States for much of the 20th century. Even the county seat Bartow has had several large groves. In 1941, the city built an airport northeast of town in the county. The airport was taken over by the federal government during World War II and was the training location for many Army Air Corps pilots during the war. The airport was returned to the city in 1967 and renamed as Bartow Municipal Airport.

=== Mid-20th century to present ===
In the 20th century, the Ku Klux Klan revived and was active in Polk County, even after World War II. Klansmen were photographed in hoods and robes in 1958 in a church in Mulberry. During the 1960s, violence related to civil-rights movement was attributed to the Klan. In 1967, a white man shot and severely wounded a popular African-American high-school football player who was integrating Lake Ariana Beach. A Klan group marched in Lakeland in full regalia in 1979, their last public march by the Confederate monument in Munn Park.

Since the late 20th century, growth in Polk County has been driven by its proximity to both the Tampa and Orlando metropolitan areas along the Interstate 4 corridor. Recent growth has been heaviest in Lakeland, closest to Tampa, and the northeast areas near Haines City, nearest to Orlando. From 1990 to 2000, unincorporated areas grew 25%, while incorporated areas grew only 11%. In addition to cottage communities that have developed for commuters, Haines City has suburban sprawl into unincorporated areas. Despite the impressive growth rate, the unemployment rate of Polk has typically been higher than that of Florida. For example, in August 2010, the county had an unemployment rate of 13.4%, compared to 11.7% for Florida.

During the 2004 Atlantic hurricane season, three hurricanes, Charley, Frances, and Jeanne, all tracked over Polk County, intersecting in a triangle that includes the city of Bartow.

Winter Haven was best known as the home of the Cypress Gardens theme park, which operated from 1936 to September 2009. Legoland Florida has since been built on the site of former Cypress Gardens, and has preserved the botanical garden section. Winter Haven was the location of the first Publix supermarket circa 1930. Today, Publix's corporate offices are located in Lakeland.

In 2018, the Lakeland City Commission voted to move the Confederate monument from Munn Park, where it was installed in 1910, to Veterans Memorial Park. What is now Veterans Memorial Park was first settled in 1883 as the community of Moorehead, the original African-American community in the area. Owners were bought out in 1967 by eminent domain for county civic development of a conference center and the later Veterans Memorial Park. Some members of the black community have objected to the Confederate monument being relocated to the site of what had been their historic community in Lakeland, saying it would be more appropriate to be located in the cemetery with numerous Confederate graves.

== Geography ==
According to the U.S. Census Bureau, the county has a total area of 2,011 square miles (5,210 km^{2}), of which 213 square miles (550 km^{2}) (10.6%) are covered by water. It is the fourth-largest county in Florida by land area and fifth-largest by total area.

Polk County is within the Central Florida Highlands area of the Atlantic coastal plain, with flatland interspersed with gently rolling hills. Part of the Lake Wales Ridge runs through eastern Polk County, which is known for its rolling hills with unique wildlife and plants. The highest elevation in the county is Crooked Lake Sandhill at 305 feet. The second-highest is Iron Mountain. Bok Tower is 295 feet above sea level. Several artificial raised phosphate tailings ponds in the center of the county rise up to 375 feet.

=== Adjacent counties ===
- Lake County – north
- Osceola County – east
- Orange County - northeast
- Okeechobee County – southeast
- Highlands County – southeast
- Hardee County – south
- Manatee County – southwest
- Hillsborough County – west
- Sumter County – northwest
- Pasco County – northwest

At its northeast corner, Polk County touches Orange County at a quadripoint called Four Corners, Florida. Lake and Osceola Counties lie between.

=== Climate ===
Polk County, like most of Florida, has a humid subtropical climate (Köppen Cfa). It lies in the USDA plant hardiness zone 9b, where the average annual minimum temperature is 25–30 °F (−4 – −1 °C). The last measurable snow in the county fell in 1977. Snow flurries and sleet fell on January 8, 2010, over the course of an hour on an exceptionally cold day.

During the summer rainy season from June to September, sea breezes from both coasts move inland, where the moist air is heated and rises to form thunderstorms. On many days, the sea-breeze thunderstorms from both coasts move inland, colliding in Polk County to form especially strong thunderstorms. Polk County is located in the middle of "lightning alley", which has more lightning annually than any region in the United States. Largely due to its size, the county receives the overall highest number of lightning strikes in the area.

The Green Swamp is prone to fog in winter. In the predawn hours of January 8, 2008, smoke from a prescribed burn contributed to especially dense fog on Interstate 4 that caused a major pileup, involving 70 vehicles in 10 separate crashes that resulted in five deaths.

Climate data for Lakeland (LAL), 1981–2010 normals, extremes 1948–present
Month	Jan	Feb	Mar	Apr	May	Jun	Jul	Aug	Sep	Oct	Nov	Dec	Year
Record high °F (°C)	87 (31)	90 (32)	92 (33)	95 (35)	103 (39)	105 (41)	102 (39)	100 (38)	98 (37)	96 (36)	93 (34)	87 (31)	105 (41)
Mean daily maximum °F (°C)	73.6 (23.1)	76.9 (24.9)	81.0 (27.2)	85.7 (29.8)	90.7 (32.6)	93.2 (34.0)	93.9 (34.4)	94.2 (34.6)	91.7 (33.2)	86.6 (30.3)	79.9 (26.6)	74.5 (23.6)	85.2 (29.6)
Mean daily minimum °F (°C)	50.2 (10.1)	52.5 (11.4)	56.2 (13.4)	60.0 (15.6)	66.5 (19.2)	71.7 (22.1)	72.8 (22.7)	73.1 (22.8)	72.1 (22.3)	66.0 (18.9)	58.5 (14.7)	52.3 (11.3)	62.7 (17.1)
Record low °F (°C)	20 (−7)	27 (−3)	25 (−4)	35 (2)	47 (8)	56 (13)	64 (18)	63 (17)	62 (17)	42 (6)	28 (−2)	20 (−7)	20 (−7)
Average precipitation inches (mm)	2.59 (66)	2.67 (68)	3.68 (93)	2.54 (65)	3.19 (81)	8.74 (222)	7.88 (200)	7.51 (191)	6.10 (155)	2.60 (66)	1.79 (45)	2.88 (73)	52.17 (1,325)
Average rainy days (≥ 0.01 in)	7.8	7.4	7.8	6.4	7.5	14.4	17.1	16.8	12.4	6.9	6.4	5.9	116.8
Mean monthly sunshine hours	203.2	209.4	258.2	302.1	306.7	255.8	255.4	248.9	226.5	239.9	213.4	203.5	2,923

==== Tropical cyclones ====
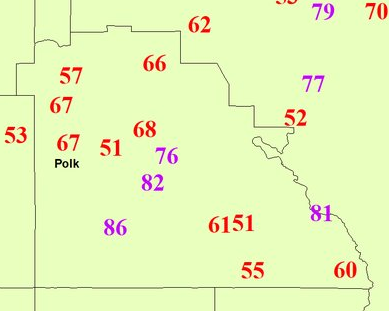
The maximum recorded wind gusts during Hurricane Irma (in mph)

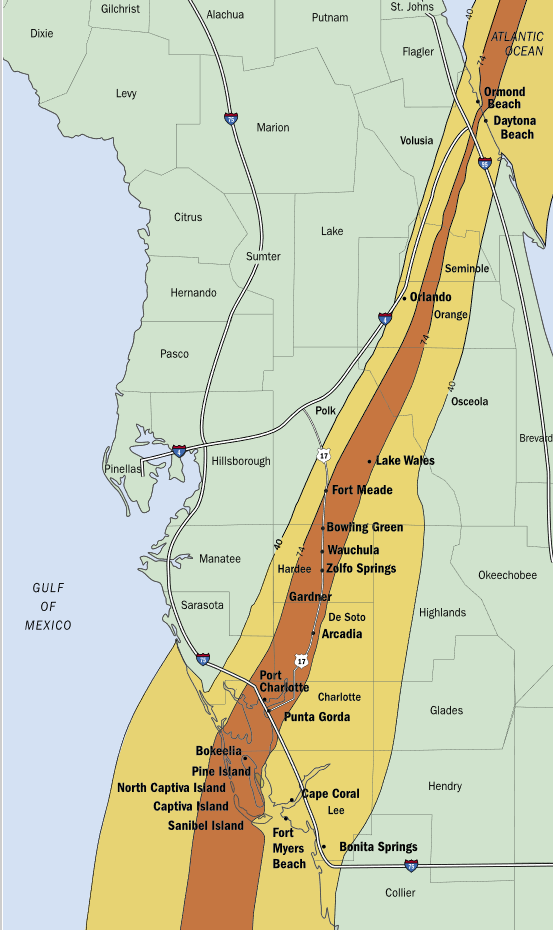
Wind field of Hurricane Charley

The eyes of 12 hurricanes have passed through the county at hurricane strength in recorded history, including Hurricane Irma (2017, category 1), Hurricane Jeanne (2004, category 1), Hurricane Charley (2004, category 2), Hurricane Donna (1960, category 2), Hurricane King (1950, category 1), the 1949 Florida hurricane (category 2), the 1945 Homestead hurricane (category 1), the 1933 Treasure Coast hurricane (category 1), the 1928 Okeechobee hurricane (category 2), Hurricane Four of the 1894 season (category 1), and Hurricane Three of the 1871 season, and Hurricane Eight of the 1859 season (category 1). Additionally, four storms were downgraded from hurricane strength at a location outside the county to tropical storm force at some point within the county and, given the hours between National Hurricane Center updates (modern era) or earlier estimates, it is not clear whether these brought hurricane-force sustained winds to Polk County: Hurricane Frances (2004), Hurricane Erin (1995) Hurricane Two of the 1939 season, and the 1910 Cuba hurricane (category 1). Numerous tropical storms have passed through the county.

Hurricane Charley in 2004—the first of three hurricanes to hit the county in six weeks—is the strongest storm in recent history to pass through the county, mainly impacting the eastern half of the county. The Lake Wales Fire Department recorded an unofficial maximum wind speed of 95 mph (153 km/h) sustained and a gust of 101 mph (163 km/h). The hurricane entered the county south of Fort Meade, shortly after it passed Wauchula (in Hardee County), where a maximum wind gust of 109 mph (175 km/h) was recorded by emergency management officials. The hurricane-force wind field was relatively narrow, with the most intense wind damage being within 10 mi (16 km) of the center of the eye. For example, maximum recorded winds were only 41 kn (76 km/h; 47 mph) sustained and a gust of 54 kn (100 km/h; 62 mph) at Gilbert Airport on the northwest side of the city.

== Demographics ==
Historical population
Census	Pop.	Note	%±
1870	3,169		—
1880	3,181		0.4%
1890	7,905		148.5%
1900	12,472		57.8%
1910	24,148		93.6%
1920	38,661		60.1%
1930	72,291		87.0%
1940	86,665		19.9%
1950	123,997		43.1%
1960	195,139		57.4%
1970	227,222		16.4%
1980	321,652		41.6%
1990	405,382		26.0%
2000	483,924		19.4%
2010	602,095		24.4%
2020	725,046		20.4%
2025 (est.)	874,790	▲	20.7%
U.S. Decennial Census; 1790–1960 1900–1990

=== 2020 Census ===
Polk County, Florida – Racial and ethnic composition Note: the US Census treats Hispanic/Latino as an ethnic category. This table excludes Latinos from the racial categories and assigns them to a separate category. Hispanics/Latinos may be of any race.
Race / Ethnicity (NH = Non-Hispanic)	Pop 1980	Pop 1990	Pop 2000	Pop 2010	Pop 2020	% 1980	% 1990	% 2000	% 2010	% 2020
White alone (NH)	262,087	331,732	361,366	388,769	392,621	81.48%	81.83%	74.67%	64.57%	54.15%
Black or African American alone (NH)	47,870	53,500	64,544	85,336	100,950	14.88%	13.20%	13.34%	14.17%	13.92%
Native American or Alaska Native alone (NH)	607	1,079	1,411	1,658	1,623	0.19%	0.27%	0.29%	0.28%	0.22%
Asian alone (NH)	1,054	2,338	4,448	9,567	13,181	0.33%	0.58%	0.92%	1.59%	1.82%
Native Hawaiian or Pacific Islander alone (NH)	x	x	129	238	300	x	x	0.03%	0.04%	0.04%
Other race alone (NH)	391	133	477	1,083	3,684	0.12%	0.03%	0.10%	0.18%	0.51%
Mixed race or Multiracial (NH)	x	x	5,616	8,912	24,992	x	x	1.16%	1.48%	3.45%
Hispanic or Latino (any race)	9,643	16,600	45,933	106,532	187,695	3.00%	4.09%	9.49%	17.69%	25.89%
Total	321,652	405,382	483,924	602,095	725,046	100.00%	100.00%	100.00%	100.00%	100.00%

As of the 2020 census, the county had a population of 725,046 and 165,183 families. The median age was 40.8 years; 21.9% of residents were under the age of 18 and 20.6% were 65 years of age or older. For every 100 females there were 94.5 males, and for every 100 females age 18 and over there were 92.0 males age 18 and over.

The racial makeup of the county was 60.6% White, 14.6% Black or African American, 0.5% American Indian and Alaska Native, 1.9% Asian, 0.1% Native Hawaiian and Pacific Islander, 9.5% from some other race, and 12.9% from two or more races. Hispanic or Latino residents of any race comprised 25.9% of the population.

89.1% of residents lived in urban areas, while 10.9% lived in rural areas.

There were 272,418 households in the county, of which 30.0% had children under the age of 18 living in them. Of all households, 48.6% were married-couple households, 16.7% were households with a male householder and no spouse or partner present, and 26.9% were households with a female householder and no spouse or partner present. About 24.1% of all households were made up of individuals and 12.0% had someone living alone who was 65 years of age or older.

There were 316,381 housing units, of which 13.9% were vacant. Among occupied housing units, 69.2% were owner-occupied and 30.8% were renter-occupied. The homeowner vacancy rate was 2.6% and the rental vacancy rate was 9.4%.

=== 2010 Census ===
U.S. Census Bureau 2010 Ethnic/Race Demographics:

- White (non-Hispanic) (75.2% when including White Hispanics): 64.6%
- Black (non-Hispanic) (14.8% when including Black Hispanics): 14.2%
- Hispanic or Latino of any race: 17.7%
- Asian: 1.6%
- Two or more races: 2.4%
- American Indian and Alaska Native: 0.4%
- Native Hawaiian and other Pacific Islander: 0.1%
- Other races: 5.5%

In 2010, the largest ancestry groups were: 12.2% German, 11.6% American, 11.2% English, 10.8% Irish, 7.6% Mexican, 5.8% Puerto Rican, 4.1% Italian, 2.6% French, 2.1% Polish, 2.0% Scotch-Irish, 1.8% Scottish, 1.5% Dutch, and 1.2% Cuban.

Of the 227,485 households, 27.3% had children under 18 living with them, 51.1% were married couples living together, 13.7% had a female householder with no husband present, and 30.0% were not families. About 23.8% of all households were made up of individuals, and 11.0% (3.4% male and 7.6% female) had someone living alone who was 65 or older. The average household size was 2.59, and the average family size was 3.05.

In the county, the age distribution was 23.5% under 18, 8.8% from 18 to 24, 24.0% from 25 to 44, 25.6% from 45 to 64, and 18.0% who were 65 or older. The median age was 39.8 years. For every 100 females, there were 96.3 males. For every 100 females 18 and over, there were 93.7 males.

The median income for a household in the county was $43,946, and for a family was $51,395. Males had a median income of $37,768 versus $30,655 for females. The per capita income for the county was $21,881. About 11.5% of families and 15.2% of the population were below the poverty line, including 23.5% of those under age 18 and 8.7% of those aged 65 or over.

In 2010, 10.7% of the county's population was foreign-born, with 37.8% being naturalized American citizens. Of foreign-born residents, 70.4% were born in Latin America, 11.5% Europe, 10.2% Asia, 4.9% North America, 2.6% Africa, and 0.4% were born in Oceania.

=== 2000 Census ===
In the 2000 census, 483,924 people, 187,233 households, and 132,373 families resided in the county. The population density was 258 people per square mile (100 people/km^{2}). The 226,376 housing units had an average density of 121 per square mile (47/km^{2}). The racial makeup of the county was 79.58% White (74.6% were Non-Hispanic White), 13.54% Black or African American, 0.38% Native American, 0.93% Asian, 0.04% Pacific Islander, 3.82% from other races, and 1.71% from two or more races. About 9.49% of the population were Hispanic or Latino of any race. In 2000, only 37% of county residents lived in incorporated metropolitan areas.

Of the 187,233 households, 29.0% had children under 18 living with them, 54.4% were married couples living together, 12.0% had a female householder with no husband present, and 29.3% were not families; 24.10% of all households were made up of individuals, and 11.10% had someone living alone who was 65 or older. The average household size was 2.52, and the average family size was 2.96.

In the county, the age distribution was 24.4% under 18, 8.3% from 18 to 24, 26.4% from 25 to 44, 22.5% from 45 to 64, and 18.3% who were 65 or older. The median age was 39 years. For every 100 females, there were 96.3 males. For every 100 females 18 and over, there were 93.1 males.

The median income for a household in the county was $36,036, and for a family was $41,442. Males had a median income of $31,396, versus $22,406 for females. The per capita income for the county was $18,302. 12.90% of the population and 9.40% of families were below the poverty line. Of the total population, 19.1% were under 18 and 8.1% were 65 or older.

=== Languages ===
In 2010, 81.80% of all residents spoke English as their first language. 14.34% spoke Spanish, 0.70% French Creole (mostly Haitian Creole,) and 0.51% of the population spoke French as their mother language. 18.20% of the population spoke languages other than English as their primary language.

== Economy ==
Polk County's economy is supported by a workforce of over 275,000 in 2010. Traditionally, the largest industries in Polk County's economy have been phosphate mining, agriculture, and tourism.

Notable companies headquartered in Polk County include Publix (an employee-owned grocery chain), and Florida's Natural (an agricultural cooperative).

=== Top employers ===
The top employers of Polk County are as follows:

1. Publix (16,537)
2. Polk County Public Schools (13,500)
3. Lakeland Regional Health (8,279)
4. Amazon (5,500)
5. Polk County Government (5,262)

== Sports ==
Polk County is home to professional baseball and basketball teams and boasts a rich history of collegiate sports competition at a number of its institutions of higher learning, including perennial NCAA Division II national championship contender and titleholder (in multiple sports), Florida Southern College.

Professional baseball, especially major league spring training, was historically a major generator of tourist traffic for Polk County. Today, only the Detroit Tigers remain for spring training. The Single-A Lakeland Flying Tigers play in Joker Marchant Stadium after spring training.

Professional basketball made its debut in 2017 when the Lakeland Magic took the court in its home venue, RP Funding Center. The team is the NBA G League developmental affiliate of the NBA's Orlando Magic. In 2023, the team relocated from Polk County to Osceola County.

College sports are popular in Polk County. The Florida Southern Moccasins play in NCAA Division II in the Sunshine State Conference. The Southeastern Fire play in NAIA Sun Conference.

== Government and politics ==
The executive and legislative powers of the county are vested in the five-member board of county commissioners. The county is divided into five separate districts. Each commissioner is elected countywide to a four-year term, and are required to live in their districts. Odd-numbered districts hold elections in presidential election years, and even-numbered districts hold elections two years later. County commissioners are subject to recall. The commissioners elect a chairman and vice-chairman annually. The chairman selects the chairs of each committee, who work with the county manager to establish the policies of the board. The commission meets twice a month - generally every other Tuesday. Additional meetings take place as needed, but must be announced per the Florida sunshine laws.

Among the most important duties of the county commission is levying taxes and appropriations. The ad valorem millage rate levied by the county for county government purposes is 6.8665. The commission is responsible for providing appropriations for other countywide offices, including the sheriff, property appraiser, tax collector, and supervisor of elections. The county and circuit court systems are also partially supported by the county budget, including the state attorneys and public defenders. A portion of the county's budget is dedicated to providing municipal-level services and regulations to unincorporated areas, such as zoning, business codes, and fire protection. Other services benefit both those in municipalities and in unincorporated Polk County, such as those that provide recreational and cultural opportunities.

Beyond the county commission, the sheriff, supervisor of elections, tax collector, property appraiser, and clerk of courts are elected offices.

=== County Commission ===
Polk County Board of County Commissioners
District	Commissioner	Party	Current term ends
1	Becky Troutman	Republican	2028
2	Rick Wilson	Republican	2026
3	Bill Braswell	Republican	2028
4	Martha Santiago	Republican	2026
5	Michael Scott	Republican	2028

=== County elected officials ===
Polk County elected officials
Office	Officeholder	Party	Current term ends
Sheriff	Grady Judd	Republican	2028
Clerk of Courts	Stacy Butterfield	Republican	2028
Property Appraiser	Neil Combee	Republican	2028
Supervisor of Elections	Melony Bell	Republican	2028
Tax Collector	Joe Tedder	Republican	2028

=== Party registration ===
As of April 30, 2025.

Party	Number of registered voters	Percentage
Republican	181,163	43.07%
Democratic	123,756	29.42%
No Party Affiliation	101,319	24.09%
Minor parties	14,372	3.42%
Total	420,610	100%

Since 1980, Polk County has supported the Republican candidate in every election, often by comfortable margins, though Democrats usually obtain over 40% of the vote. In 2024, Donald Trump performed better than any Republican in the county since George H. W. Bush in 1988 and held the Democratic candidate under 40% of the vote, with Kamala Harris obtaining 39.1%, for the first time since 1992.

United States presidential election results for Polk County, Florida
Year	Republican		Democratic		Third party(ies)	
Year	No.	%	No.	%	No.	%
1892	0	0.00%	869	81.90%	192	18.10%
1896	279	18.42%	1,155	76.24%	81	5.35%
1900	133	10.77%	983	79.60%	119	9.64%
1904	125	11.72%	869	81.44%	73	6.84%
1908	290	16.14%	1,251	69.62%	256	14.25%
1912	106	4.98%	1,520	71.43%	502	23.59%
1916	578	17.10%	2,574	76.13%	229	6.77%
1920	1,782	29.95%	3,918	65.86%	249	4.19%
1924	1,530	28.89%	3,070	57.97%	696	13.14%
1928	7,460	60.23%	4,576	36.94%	350	2.83%
1932	3,490	26.94%	9,463	73.06%	0	0.00%
1936	4,164	28.51%	10,441	71.49%	0	0.00%
1940	5,564	23.93%	17,690	76.07%	0	0.00%
1944	5,150	28.14%	13,152	71.86%	0	0.00%
1948	7,692	33.60%	12,034	52.57%	3,166	13.83%
1952	20,874	51.63%	19,556	48.37%	0	0.00%
1956	23,682	55.98%	18,626	44.02%	0	0.00%
1960	31,618	57.32%	23,546	42.68%	0	0.00%
1964	35,906	55.02%	29,355	44.98%	0	0.00%
1968	27,839	36.98%	15,898	21.12%	31,540	41.90%
1972	60,748	78.42%	16,419	21.20%	293	0.38%
1976	44,238	47.72%	47,286	51.01%	1,182	1.27%
1980	59,651	56.11%	43,327	40.75%	3,337	3.14%
1984	84,246	70.33%	35,516	29.65%	22	0.02%
1988	77,104	66.45%	38,249	32.96%	687	0.59%
1992	65,963	45.21%	51,450	35.26%	28,487	19.53%
1996	67,962	45.26%	66,747	44.45%	15,464	10.30%
2000	90,310	53.56%	75,207	44.60%	3,112	1.85%
2004	123,559	58.61%	86,009	40.80%	1,262	0.60%
2008	128,878	52.45%	113,865	46.34%	2,961	1.21%
2012	131,577	52.75%	114,622	45.95%	3,243	1.30%
2016	157,430	54.86%	117,433	40.92%	12,106	4.22%
2020	194,586	56.56%	145,049	42.16%	4,391	1.28%
2024	209,044	59.71%	136,879	39.10%	4,191	1.20%

== Education ==
Polk County Public Schools serves the county.

=== Universities and colleges ===
==== State University System of Florida (public) ====
- Florida Polytechnic University

==== Florida College System (Public) ====
- Polk State College (previously known as Polk Community College)

==== Private institutions ====
- Southeastern University (affiliated with the Assemblies of God)
- Florida Southern College
- Warner University (affiliated with the Church of God)
- Webber International University
- Keiser University, Lakeland Campus (not-for-profit)
- Southern Technical College, Auburndale Campus

== Library cooperative ==
The coordinator of the Library Co-Op discusses outreach services provided by the public library system.

The Polk County Library Cooperative was formed in 1997, through an interlocal agreement between the 13 municipalities with public libraries and the board of county commissioners. The cooperative enables the city-owned and -operated public libraries to open their doors to all residents of the county, including those in the unincorporated areas.

=== Interlibrary Loan ===
Interlibrary Loan (ILL) offers library patrons the opportunity to request and receive books that are not owned by the Winter Haven Public Library. Through ILL, patrons have access to the book collections of all the library systems in Polk County, and all of the library systems in Florida, and universities and public library systems in the United States.

=== Cooperative member libraries ===
- Auburndale Public Library
- Bartow Public Library
- Dundee Public Library
- Eagle Lake Public Library
- Fort Meade Public Library
- Latt Maxcy Memorial Library
- Haines City Public Library
- Lake Alfred Public Library
- Lake Wales Public Library
- Lakeland Public Library
- Lakeland Main (Downtown)
- Larry R. Jackson Branch (North Lakeland)
- eLibrary (South Lakeland) a joint project between City of Lakeland and Library Cooperative
- Mulberry Public Library
- Polk City Community Library
- Winter Haven Public Library, Kathryn L. Smith Memorial
- Justice Stephen H. Grimes Law Library (County operated non-circulating special collection)

=== Services ===
- Provides the structure for members to give seamless countywide library services
- Coordinates activities, information and funding for member libraries
- Facilitates Interlibrary Loans
- Delivers materials between member libraries five days a week
- Operates a Wide Area Network linking all member libraries to shared resources and services
- Provides e-mail to and designs/houses web pages for members
- Manages e-rate program for members
- Synchronizes continuing education and staff development opportunities for members

=== Polk County Historical and Genealogical Library ===
==== History ====
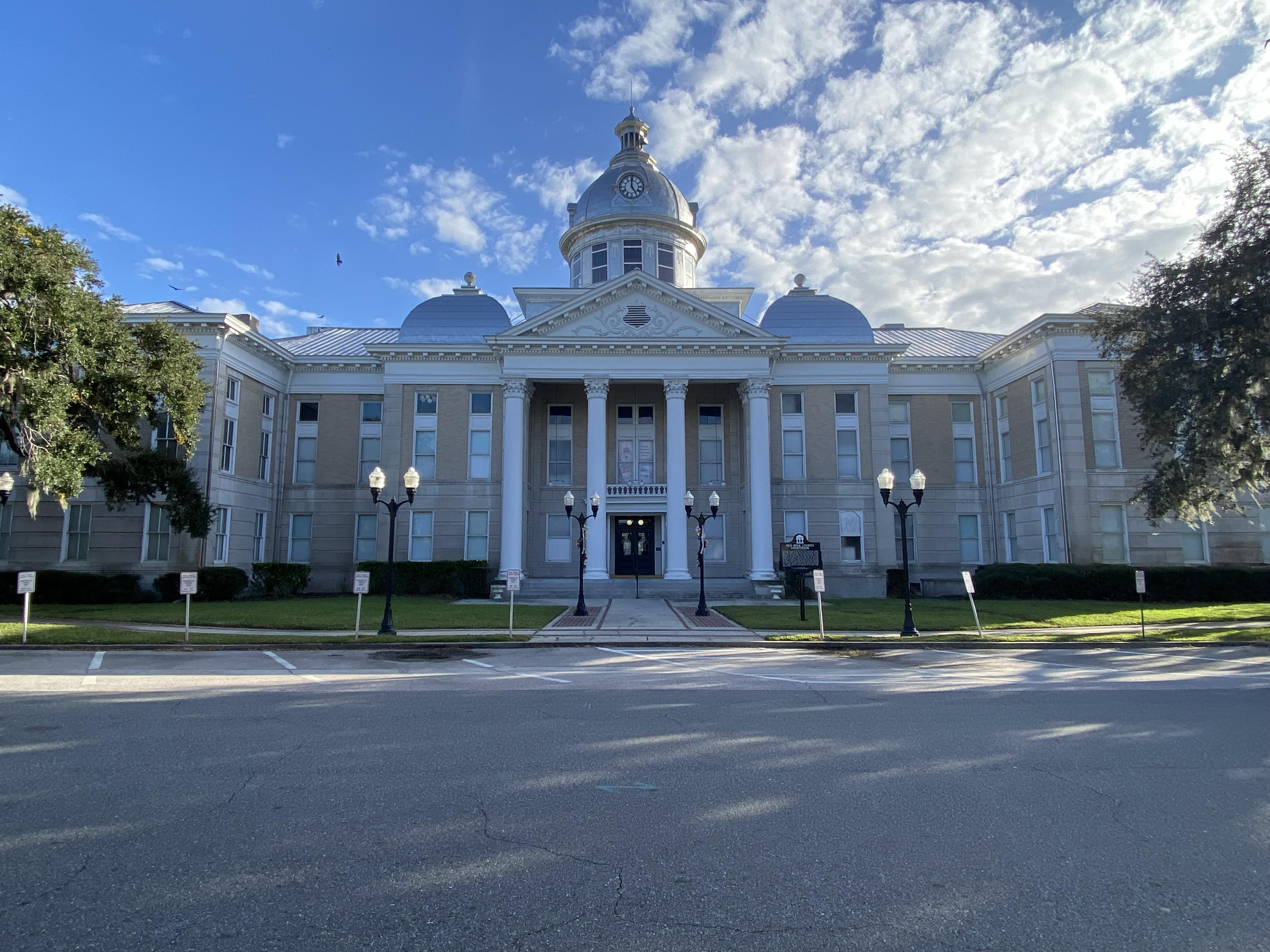
Polk County History Center where the Genealogical Library is located.

The Polk County Historical and Genealogical Library was established in 1937, and opened to the public in January 1940. The library was first located in the office of the county attorney and its holdings were all housed in a metal bookcase. Since then, the library has been housed in different locations within the old Polk County Courthouse. In 1968, the library hired its first full-time employee. In 1974, the library added a second employee and was moved to a new location on Hendry Street. In 1987, the library relocated back to the 1908 Courthouse.

It was renovated during a 10-year process, incorporating all three floors of the eastern wing of the courthouse. As of 2013, the library is located in the east wing of the historical courthouse in Bartow. It is governed by the Polk County Board of County Commissioners and administered by the Neighborhood Services Department and the Leisure Services Division. The library holds one of the largest genealogical and historical collections in the Southeastern United States.

==== Collections and services ====
The Polk County Historical and Genealogical Library holds more than 40,000 items in its collection, which includes books, microfilm, and periodicals with information about the history and genealogy of the entire Eastern United States. The selection of materials related to the history of Polk County contains local newspapers dated back to 1881, aerial photography to 1938, city directories to 1925 and property tax rolls to 1882. Four full-time staff members are available for assistance at the library. The library also offers local obituary searches and basic looks-ups via email.

== Sites of interest ==
- Bok Tower Gardens
- Child of the Sun
- Dundee station
- Explorations V Children's Museum
- Fantasy of Flight
- Florida Air Museum
- Homeland Heritage Park
- Lake Kissimmee State Park
- Lake Wales station
- Legoland Florida
- Mulberry Phosphate Museum
- Old Fort Meade School House
- Polk County Historical Museum
- Polk Museum of Art
- Polk's Nature Discovery Center
- Posner Park
- Saddle Creek Park
- Water Ski Hall of Fame and Museum

== Media ==
Polk is part of the Tampa Bay media market.

=== Newspapers ===
- The Polk County Democrat 1931–present
- The Lakeland Ledger 1924–present; owned by New Media Investment Group
- The Winter Haven News Chief 1911–present
- The Business Observer 1997–present

=== Radio ===
Callsign	City	Format
WLLD	Lakeland	Rhythmic contemporary
WLKF	Lakeland	News Talk Information
WPCV	Lakeland	Country music
WSEU	Lakeland	Contemporary Christian music, sports
WWBF	Bartow	Classic hits music and Bartow High School sports
WLVF	Haines City	Southern gospel music

=== Television ===
- WMOR-TV (licensed to Lakeland, with studios in Tampa)

== Transportation ==
=== Airports ===
- Lakeland Linder International Airport. In 2017, Linder welcomed its first international flight. In 2018, the name was changed to reflect the airport's international status.
- Bartow Municipal Airport
- Lake Wales Municipal Airport
- Jack Browns Seaplane Base
- Winter Haven's Gilbert Airport
- South Lakeland Airport
- Chalet Suzanne Air Strip
- River Ranch resort Airport

=== Highways ===
- Limited Access Highways
  - I-4 (Interstate 4) – This interstate highway cuts across the northern part of the county, entering from Tampa and Plant City in the west, bypassing Lakeland, Auburndale, and Haines City, and heading northeast toward the greater Orlando area.
  - SR 570 (or Polk Parkway) – With endpoints at I-4, this toll road traverses primarily around Lakeland, intersecting with several major routes in southern Lakeland and additionally providing access to Winter Haven and Legoland via SR 540, and Auburndale via US 92. It exists as SR 570.
  - Central Polk Parkway (Under Development)
  - Heartland Parkway (proposed)
- U.S. Highways
  - US 17 – This U.S. highway enters Polk County from the southwest, bypassing Fort Meade on its way to Bartow, and eventually through Eagle Lake into Winter Haven. North of Winter Haven, in Lake Alfred, it joins with US 92 to form a concurrency that continues north and east through Haines City and Davenport toward Kissimmee and Orlando.
  - US 27 – This primary thoroughfare in eastern Polk County bypasses several cities, including Frostproof, Lake Wales, Dundee, Lake Hamilton, Haines City, and Davenport. Its interchange with I-4 is a gateway to the Orlando area.
  - US 92 – This route essentially parallels I-4 to the south over its journey through Polk County. From Plant City to the west, it enters Polk County and crosses Lakeland, emerging and continuing on through Auburndale. It joins US 17 in Lake Alfred.
  - US 98 – This route crosses northwest to southeast across Polk County. Entering from Pasco County, it cuts through Lakeland and leads to Bartow. In Bartow, it begins a concurrency with US 17 through Fort Meade, where it jogs over to meet US 27 in Frostproof. US 98 is concurrent with US 27 as it exits Polk County to the southeast.
  - US 192 – This highway has its western terminus at US 27 along the border of Polk and Lake Counties. It runs eastward from this junction to provide access to Disney World, the Orlando area, and the Space Coast.
- Major State Roads
  - SR 17 – This scenic highway winds parallel to the east of US 27, running through the downtown areas of Lake Wales, Dundee, Lake Hamilton, and Haines City.
  - SR 33 – It stems northward from Lakeland and leads to Polk City, and continues northward through the Green Swamp.
  - SR 37 – Also called South Florida Avenue, this road connects Mulberry to southern Lakeland.
  - SR 60 – The major route of southern Polk County and the county's largest state road, it connects Mulberry and Bartow with Lake Wales on its route from coast to coast in Florida.
  - SR 540 – This road leads from Highland City in the Lakeland area to Winter Haven as Winter-Lake Road, then jogging over at US 17 and providing access to Legoland and US 27 as Cypress Gardens Boulevard.
  - SR 542 – This road travels through central Polk County, connecting downtown Winter Haven to US 27 and Dundee.
  - SR 544 – This road leads first from Auburndale to Winter Haven as Havendale Boulevard, and continues north and east as a scenic route to southern Haines City.
  - SR 559 – This route straddles Lake Ariana in Auburndale and connects this city with Polk City, also providing access to I-4.

=== Intercity rail ===
Polk County has two Amtrak train stations, in Winter Haven and Lakeland. Both stations are served by the Floridian, with the Winter Haven station alone also served by the Silver Meteor.

== Communities ==
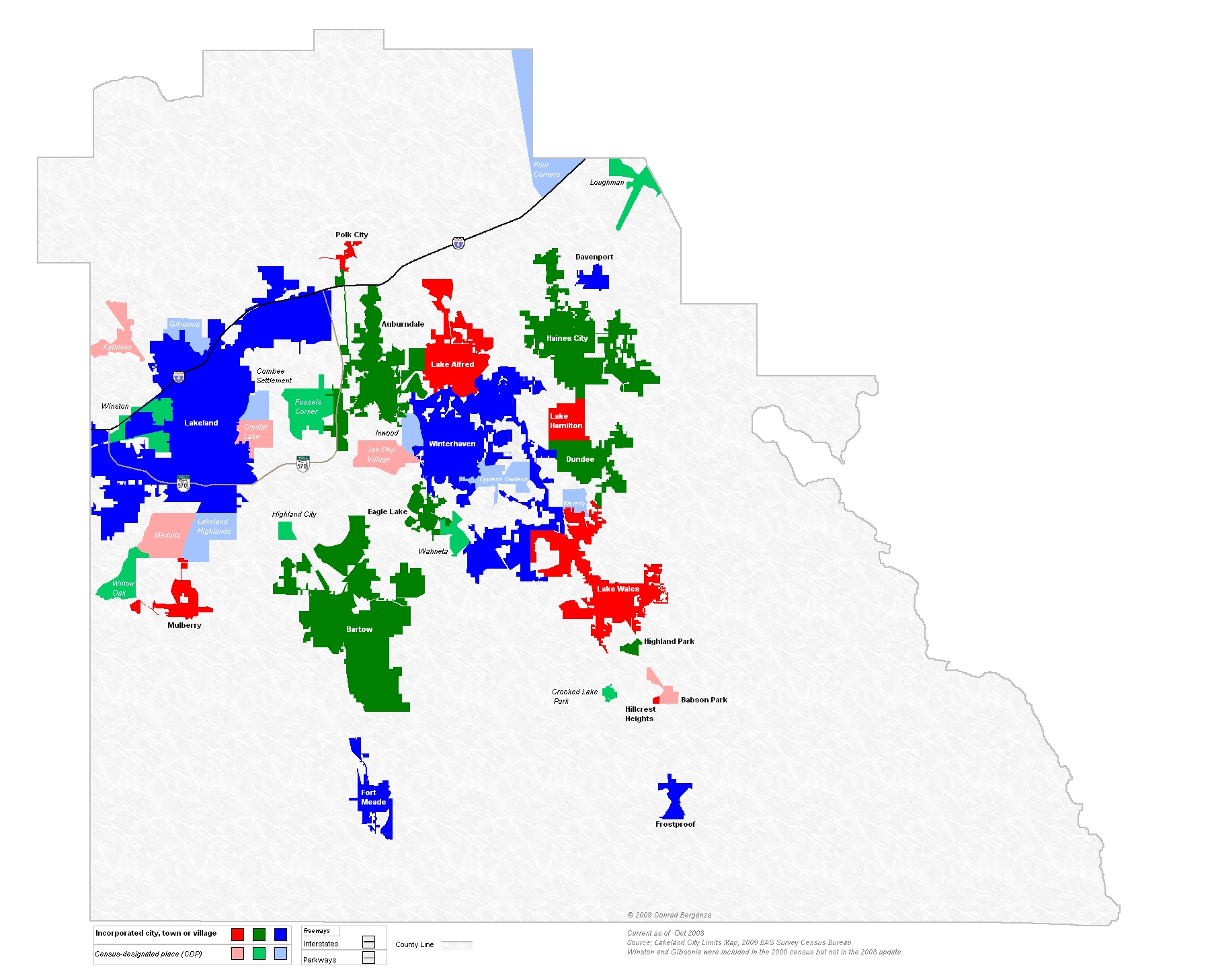
Municipalities of Polk County

In the 2010 Census, just under 38% of the county's population lives in one of Polk's seventeen incorporated municipalities. The largest city, Lakeland, has over 112,000 residents and is located in the western edge of the county. The other core city of the metropolitan area, Winter Haven, is located in the eastern part of the county and has 34,000 residents.

The county seat, Bartow, is located southeast of Lakeland and southwest of Winter Haven and has over 17,000 residents. The cities of Bartow, Lakeland, and Winter Haven form a roughly equilateral triangle pointed downward with Bartow being the south point, Lakeland the west point, and Winter Haven the east point.

The other major cities in the county with a population over 10,000 include Haines City, Auburndale, and Lake Wales. Haines City is in the northeast part of the county and has over 20,000 residents. Auburndale is located northwest of Winter Haven. Lake Wales is around 16 miles east of Bartow.

=== Cities ===
- Auburndale
- Bartow
- Davenport
- Eagle Lake
- Fort Meade
- Frostproof
- Haines City
- Lake Alfred
- Lakeland
- Lake Wales
- Mulberry
- Polk City
- Winter Haven

=== Towns ===
- Dundee
- Hillcrest Heights
- Lake Hamilton

=== Village ===
- Highland Park

=== Census-designated places ===
- Alturas
- Babson Park
- Bradley Junction
- Combee Settlement
- Crooked Lake Park
- Crystal Lake
- Cypress Gardens
- Four Corners
- Fuller Heights
- Fussels Corner
- Grenelefe
- Highland City
- Homeland
- Indian Lake Estates
- Inwood
- Jan Phyl Village
- Kathleen
- Lakeland Highlands
- Loughman
- Medulla
- Poinciana
- Wahneta
- Waverly
- Willow Oak

=== Other unincorporated communities ===
- Acton
- Galloway
- Gibsonia
- Griffin
- Lakeshore
- Mountain Lake
- Nalcrest
- Pittsburg
- Winston

== See also ==
- National Register of Historic Places listings in Polk County, Florida
