= Winter Haven Public Library =

Public library

- 28.023819906720135°N 81.73022351239189°W
- Location: Winter Haven, Florida, United States
- Type: Public library
- Established: 1907
- Branch of: Polk County Library Cooperative

Other information
- Website: www.mywinterhaven.com/library

The Winter Haven Public Library, Kathryn L. Smith Memorial is located in Winter Haven, Florida at 325 Avenue A NW. It is a member of the Polk County Library Cooperative.

== History ==
Winter Haven first established a library in 1907, when Dr. Samuel Harrison Woods placed a few books on a shelf in his drugstore. Mrs. Woods was in charge of the lending and returns. In 1915, the Women's Civic League (later the Woman's Club of Winter Haven) announced that it would be assuming responsibility and control of the library, now situated on the second floor of a commercial building downtown, and did so until 1952.

In 1924, the library moved to the former home of a prominent citizen (still located downtown), and, in 1952, the Woman's Club of Winter Haven donated the building, collection, plans and monies for a new library to the City of Winter Haven. In 1955, the first portion of the library located on Central Avenue was opened, with 6,000 books and plenty of room to expand the collection. Thirty years later, the library held a collection of 48,000, and had added an annex ten years earlier, in 1976. Also, in 1976, the Friends of the Winter Haven Public Library Inc. was formed with its stated purpose "to promote public interest and participation in the Winter Haven Public Library, its services, facilities, and needs, and to promote gifts of books, magazines, desirable collections, endowments, bequests, and any other thing which would be helpful to those using the facilities of the public library" The organization has a small bookshop across the hall from the library that is staffed by volunteers. In the current building they sell weeded books for $1 or less, and at predetermined times in the year, gives books away to the public. The third Saturday of each month is "Half-Price Day." Everything in the store, including the collectibles, is sold for half of the marked price.

In 1997, the Polk County Library Cooperative was created. This library co-op allows patrons from any location in the county to receive and enjoy materials from any Polk County Library; a mobile library is included along with Books by Mail (a service that allows a member to check out material online upon which point it is mailed to them with no fees.

== Current library ==
In 1998, the City of Winter Haven contracted Architects in Association Rood and Zwick, Inc., to conduct a “Space Needs Study for the Expansion of the Winter Haven Public Library” The space is also used for hosting technology classes for the public. This firm was subsequently hired as architects for the new library

The current library opened in 2004, and was titled the 'Kathryn L. Smith Memorial Library'. Mrs. Smith had been Head Librarian from 1973 to 2004, and was responsible for many programs, including Friends of the Library, and had helped raise funds for the current building. In 2014, a new space was created in the Information Commons, called the S.E.E.D. (Science, Education, Exploration, Design) Lab. This space offers more flexible hands-on access to research and project space, including a 3-D printer and a Cameo electronic cutter that allows users to create designs for fabrics, vinyl, etching glass, and scrapbooking.

In 2020, the children’s department was renovated to include a sensory room. The sensory room, which was designed considering the needs of children on the spectrum, allows children to engage in a variety of sensory experiences. Interactive elements within the room include a bubble tube, an infinity wall, tactile wall panels, LED lights, fiber optic glow strands, a vibro acoustic bench, a sound interactive panel, fidget toys, and a video screen that displays calming scenes. Caregivers can customize the experience depending on the sensory needs of the child, transforming the room into either a calming space for those experiencing sensory overload or a more active play area for those in need of sensory stimulation. The room is available by appointment during library business hours.

The Winter Haven Public Library began construction for a Sensory Garden and Discovery Space in 2023. The garden is designed for the “well-being, learning, and coping needs of children and adults with autism, sensory impairments, Alzheimer’s, and dementia”. Once completed, the garden will offer an immersive sensory experience for patrons and serve as a programming space for the library. The project is funded by donations from the nonprofit Friends of the Library organization and Rockin’ on the Chain, a group that fundraises for projects benefiting people with autism and special needs. The Sensory Garden and Discovery Space is expected to open in 2024.
