= Alturas, Florida =

- Census-designated place
- Location in Polk County, Florida
- Coordinates: 27°52′18″N 81°42′54″W
- Country: United States
- State: Florida
- County: Polk

Area
  - Total: 60.00 sq mi (155.39 km^{2})
  - Land: 54.00 sq mi (139.85 km^{2})
  - Water: 6.00 sq mi (15.53 km^{2})
- Elevation: 174 ft (53 m)

Population (2020)
  - Total: 4,084
  - Density: 76/sq mi (29.2/km^{2})
- Time zone: UTC-5 (Eastern (EST))
  - Summer (DST): UTC-4 (EDT)
- ZIP code: 33820
- Area code: 863
- GNIS feature ID: 277828

Alturas is an unincorporated community and census-designated place in Polk County, central Florida, United States. Its population was 4,084 as of the 2020 census. Alturas has a post office with ZIP code 33820.

The main road that runs through Alturas is Polk County Road 665A. Florida State Road 60 runs just north of the community.

== Demographics ==
Historical population
Census	Pop.	Note	%±
2010	4,185		—
2020	4,084		−2.4%
U.S. Decennial Census

Alturas first appeared as a census designated place in the 2010 U.S. census.

=== Racial and ethnic composition ===
Alturas CDP, Florida – Racial and ethnic composition Note: the US Census treats Hispanic/Latino as an ethnic category. This table excludes Latinos from the racial categories and assigns them to a separate category. Hispanics/Latinos may be of any race.
Race / Ethnicity (NH = Non-Hispanic)	Pop 2010	Pop 2020	% 2010	% 2020
White alone (NH)	3,237	3,040	77.35%	74.44%
Black or African American alone (NH)	134	106	3.20%	2.60%
Native American or Alaska Native alone (NH)	18	30	0.43%	0.73%
Asian alone (NH)	14	8	0.33%	0.20%
Native Hawaiian or Pacific Islander alone (NH)	0	0	0.00%	0.00%
Other race alone (NH)	3	11	0.07%	0.27%
Mixed race or Multiracial (NH)	65	131	1.55%	3.21%
Hispanic or Latino (any race)	714	758	17.06%	18.56%
Total	4,185	4,084	100.00%	100.00%

=== 2020 census ===
As of the 2020 census, Alturas had a population of 4,084. The median age was 42.1 years. 22.5% of residents were under the age of 18 and 18.9% of residents were 65 years of age or older. For every 100 females there were 98.3 males, and for every 100 females age 18 and over there were 99.9 males age 18 and over.

0.0% of residents lived in urban areas, while 100.0% lived in rural areas.

There were 1,453 households in Alturas, of which 29.4% had children under the age of 18 living in them. Of all households, 54.4% were married-couple households, 18.1% were households with a male householder and no spouse or partner present, and 19.9% were households with a female householder and no spouse or partner present. About 21.8% of all households were made up of individuals and 12.8% had someone living alone who was 65 years of age or older.

There were 1,691 housing units, of which 14.1% were vacant. The homeowner vacancy rate was 2.7% and the rental vacancy rate was 7.2%.

Racial composition as of the 2020 census
Race	Number	Percent
White	3,313	81.1%
Black or African American	116	2.8%
American Indian and Alaska Native	45	1.1%
Asian	10	0.2%
Native Hawaiian and Other Pacific Islander	0	0.0%
Some other race	221	5.4%
Two or more races	379	9.3%
