= Lake Kissimmee State Park =

State park in Florida, United States

- IUCN category V (protected landscape/seascape)
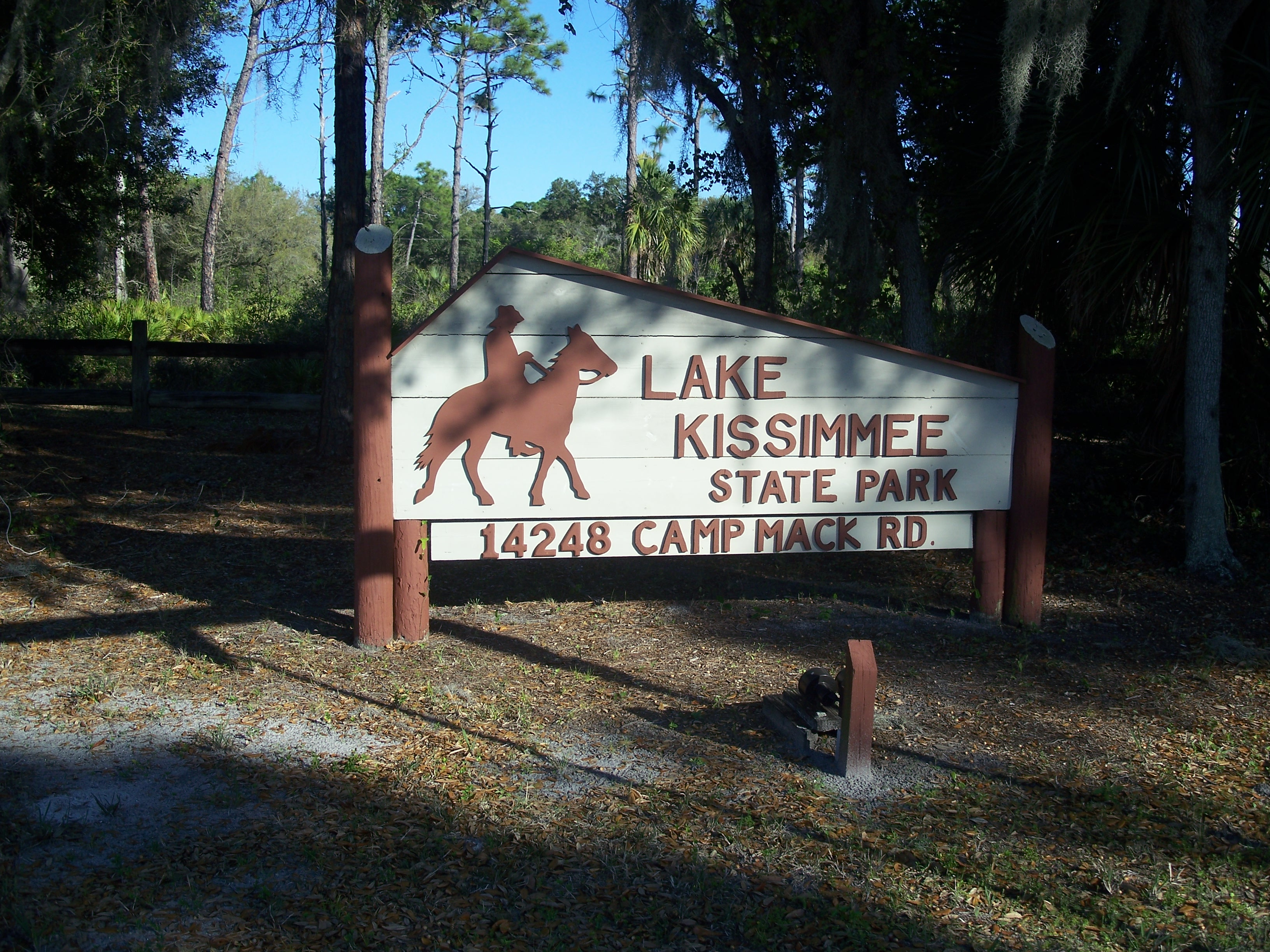
- Park sign at the entrance on Camp Mack Road

- Location within Florida Location within the United States
- Interactive map of Lake Kissimmee State Park
- Location: Polk County, Florida, USA
- Nearest city: Lake Wales, Florida
- Coordinates: 27°57′29″N 81°22′30″W
- Area: 5,930 acres (24.0 km^{2})
- Governing body: Florida Department of Environmental Protection

Lake Kissimmee State Park is a 5,930-acre (24 km^{2}) Florida State Park located north of State Road 60, 15 miles (24 km) east of Lake Wales. It contains floodplain, forest, prairie, hammock, flatwoods and Lakes Kissimmee, Tiger, and Rosalie. The park is home to 50 species of plants and animals that are either threatened, of special concern or endangered.

Activities include boating, canoeing, kayaking and fishing as well as camping, hiking, biking, horseback riding trails, and nature viewing. Among the wildlife of the park are two hundred species of birds, including the bald eagle, snail kite and whooping crane. Other animals are bobcat, grey fox and wild turkey, as well as white-tailed deer, sandhill crane, fox squirrel and otter. . Amenities include thirteen miles (21 km) of hiking and multi-use trails and six miles (9.7 km) of horse trails and fishing docks. The park's sixty full facility campsites are located in an oak hammock. There are two primitive campsites and a youth camping area. More than 30,000 acres (120 km^{2}) of lakes are accessible from the park. The park is open from 7:00 am till sundown year-round. The cow camp is open 9:30 a.m. to 4:30 p.m. on weekends and holidays from October through May 1.

== Cow Camp ==
Cow Camp is a living history site that depicts an 1876 cattle camp, including Florida scrub cattle. Local cattlemen were commonly referred to as Cracker Cowboys or "Cow Hunters". Cow Camp is open on weekends and holidays from the first weekend in October through May 1 .

.

== Gallery ==
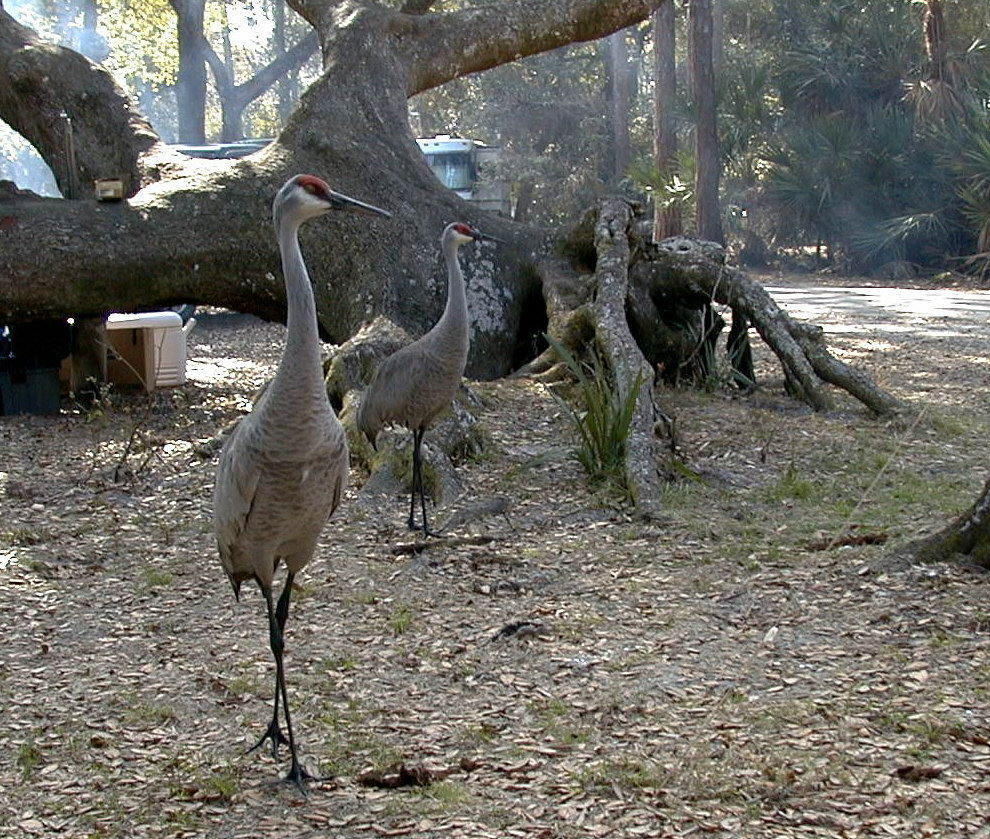
Sandhill cranes in the campground.

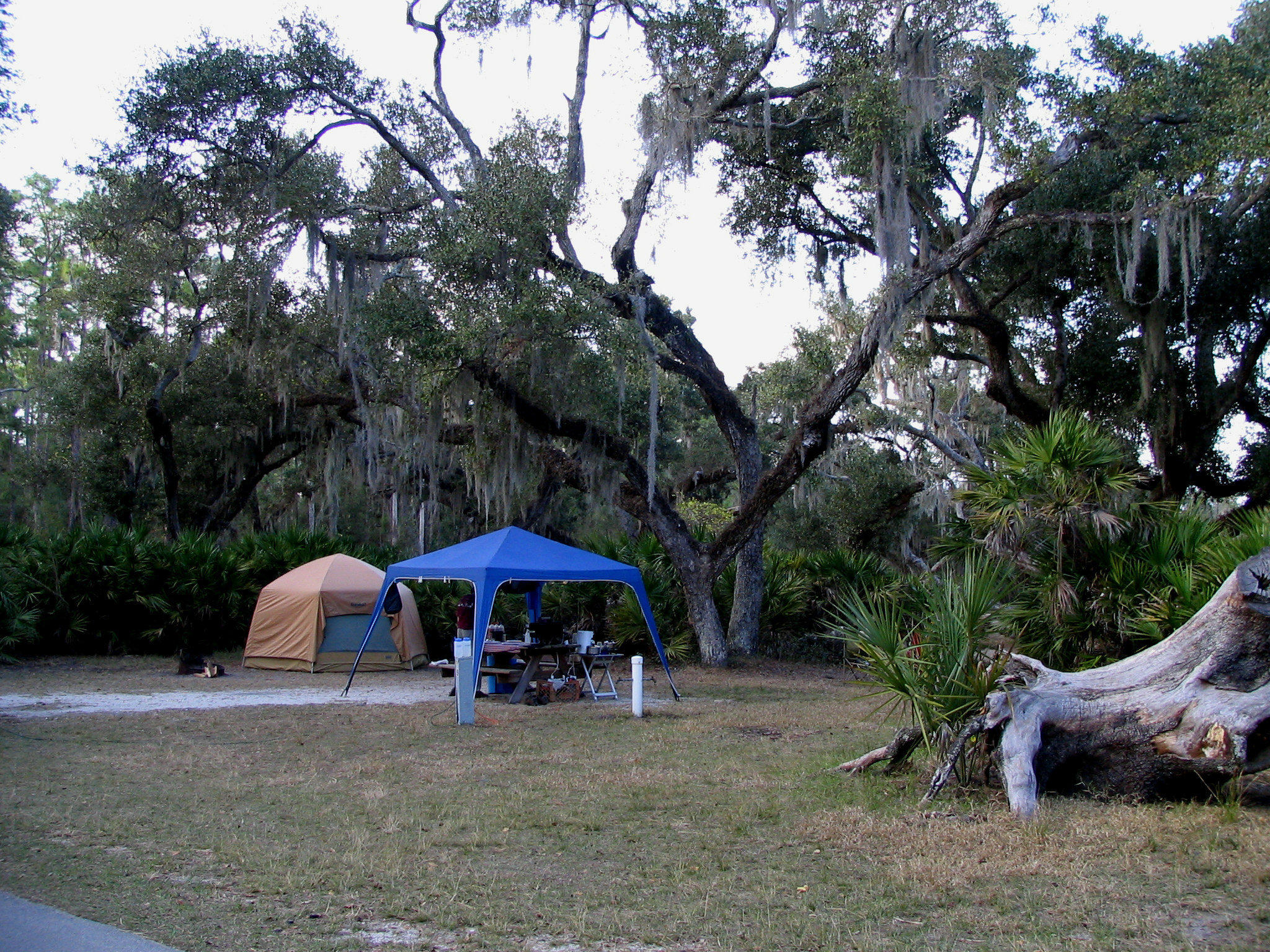
A campsite in the park.
