= Indian Lake Estates, Florida =

- Unincorporated community
- Location within Florida Location within the United States
- Coordinates: 27°47′52″N 81°21′55″W
- Country: United States
- State: Florida
- County: Polk
- Elevation: 82 ft (25 m)
- Time zone: UTC-5 (Eastern (EST))
  - Summer (DST): UTC-4 (EDT)
- ZIP code: 33855
- Area code: 863
- GNIS feature ID: 2806013

Indian Lake Estates is an unincorporated community in Polk County, Florida, United States. As of the 2020 census, Indian Lake Estates had a population of 926. Indian Lake Estates is located on the eastern shore of Lake Weohyakapka (Lake Walk-in-Water), 14 miles (23 km) east-southeast of Lake Wales.

== History ==
El Dorado Estates, Inc. was incorporated in January 1955, with Washington, D.C. real estate developer Leon Ackerman as its only shareholder. In October 1955, the company's name was changed to Indian Lake Estates, Inc. and it purchased a large tract of undeveloped land on the shores of Lake Walk-in-Water, about 19 miles southeast of Lake Wales. The company purchased the 12-square-mile tract for $222,000, or roughly $35 per acre.

Ackerman envisioned an exclusive gated community of 15,000 residents, complete with golf course, country club, marina, and pier on Lake Walk-in-Water. In December 1955, the first plat of the 7,200-acre community was recorded at the county courthouse. The company invested millions to build a network of canals near the lake, a quarter-mile pier, and 200 miles of roads throughout the development, of which 98 miles are paved. Prices for half-acre lots in the community started at $2,250. However, most of the buyers of plots were land speculators and only about 150 homes were built in the initial years after the community was founded. By 1959, financial problems seemed imminent and the following year Ackerman sold his interest in the company to Alaska Oil & Mineral Company, Inc. However, the Indian Lake Estates, Inc. went bankrupt in April 1965. As of 2009, there are about 700 homes, mostly near the lake or golf course, on the community's over 8,000 lots.

== Demographics ==
Indian Lake Estates first appeared as a census designated place in the 2020 U.S. census.

== Notable residents ==
- Harold Edward "Red" Grange (1959–1991)
