= Bartow Downtown Commercial District =

Historic district in Florida, United States

- U.S. National Register of Historic Places
- U.S. Historic district
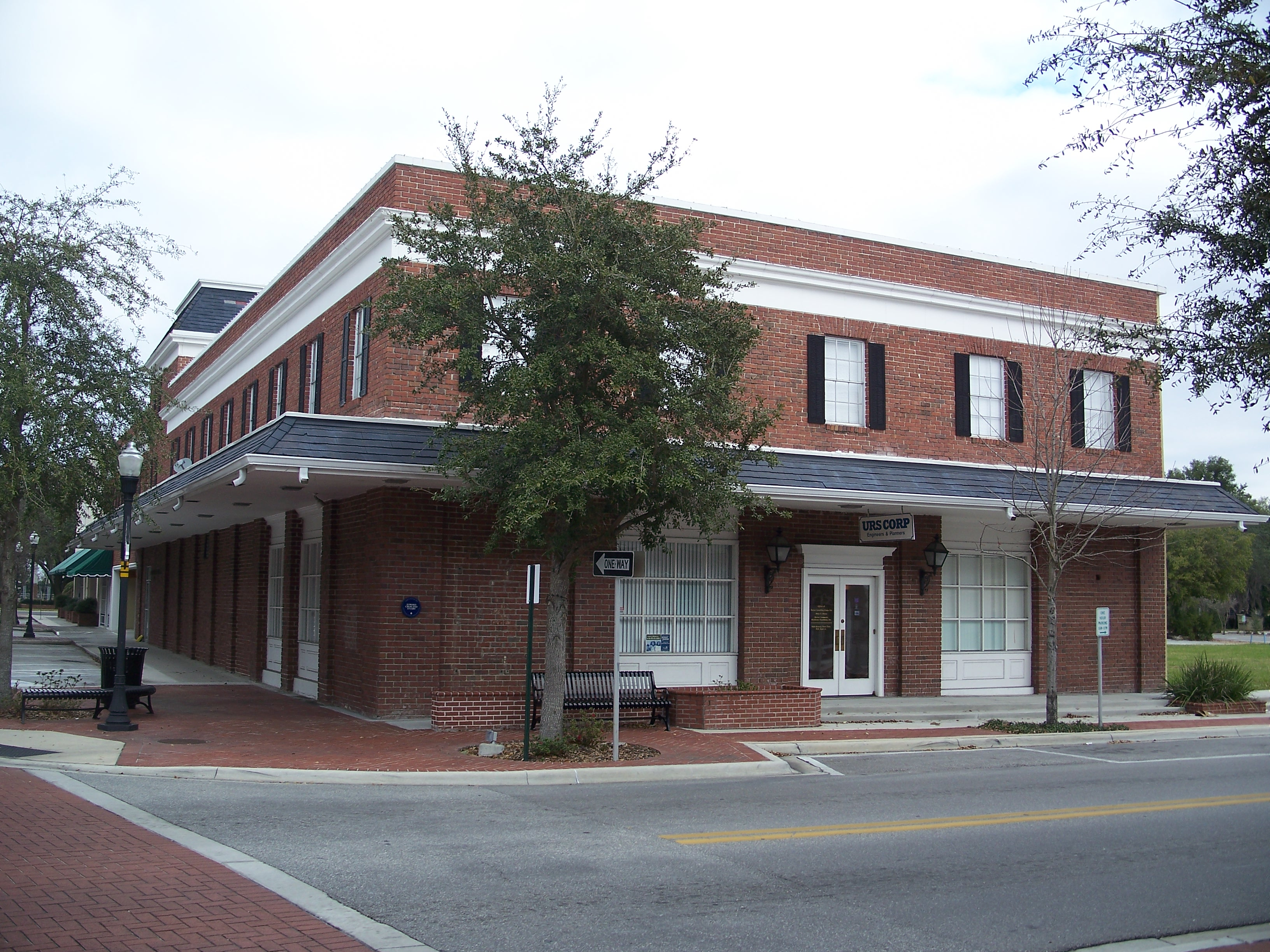

- Location within Florida Location within the United States
- Location: Roughly bounded by Davidson and Summerlin Sts. and Broadway and Florida Aves., Bartow, Florida
- Coordinates: 27°53′47″N 81°50′34″W
- Area: 7 acres (2.8 ha)
- Built: 1885
- Architectural style: Classical Revival, Vernacular, Masonry
- MPS: Bartow MPS
- NRHP reference No.: 93000393
- Added to NRHP: May 18, 1993

The Bartow Downtown Commercial District (also known as the Old Polk County Courthouse) is a historic district in central Bartow, Florida. Composed of an area bounded by Davidson and Summerlin Streets and Broadway and Florida Avenues, the district includes twenty-one contributing properties. It was added to the National Register of Historic Places in 1993.
