= South Lakeland Airport =

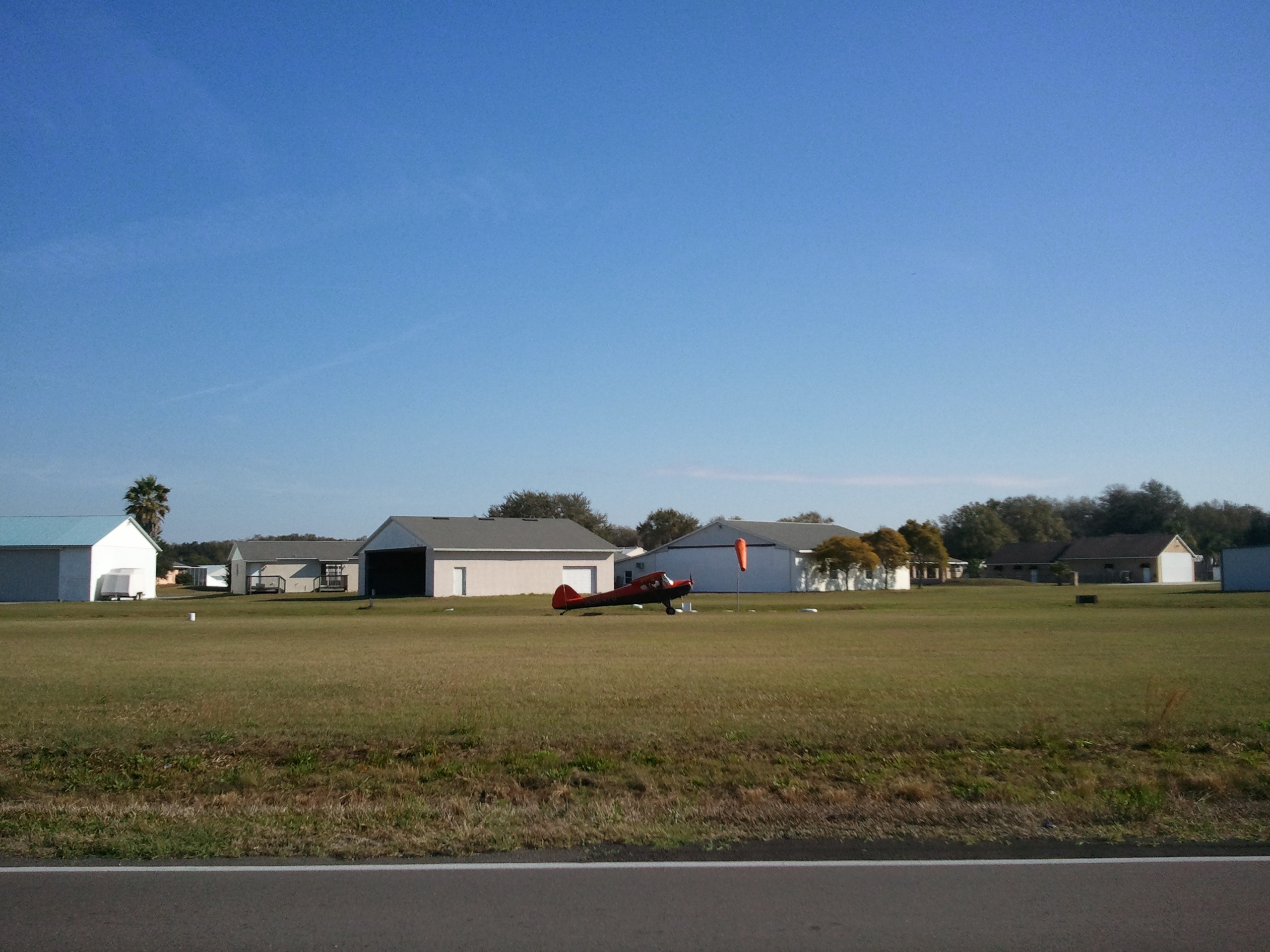
- South Lakeland Airport in 2012
- IATA: none; ICAO: none; FAA LID: X49

Summary
- Airport type: Public
- Owner: South Lakeland Airport, Inc.
- Location: Lakeland, Florida
- Elevation AMSL: 110 ft / 34 m
- Coordinates: 27°56′00″N 82°02′38″W
- Interactive map of South Lakeland Airport

Runways
Direction	Length		Surface
Direction	ft	m	Surface
14/32	3,115	949	Turf

South Lakeland Airport (FAA LID: X49) is a public airport located 13.5 miles south of the central business district (CBD) of Lakeland, a city in Polk County, Florida, United States. The airport covers 32 acres and has one runway. The airport is also home to a regional skydiving company, Skydive Tampa Bay, Inc.

== Gallery ==
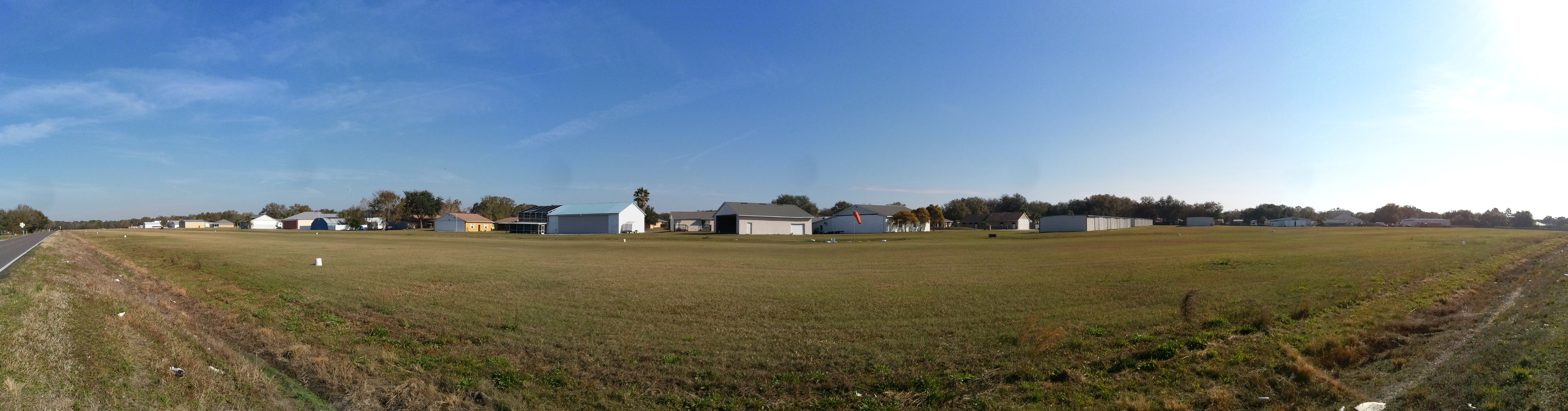
South Lakeland Airport in 2012

== See also ==
- Lakeland Linder International Airport
- List of airports in Florida
