= Nalcrest, Florida =

Retirement community in Florida, U.S.

Coordinates: 27°51′30″N 81°25′30″W

Nalcrest is a retirement community in Polk County, Florida, United States. The community's ZIP code is 33856. It is part of the Lakeland–Winter Haven Metropolitan Statistical Area.

The community's name is an acronym for National Association of Letter Carriers Retirement, Education, Security and Training, as it was designed by and continues to be operated by the Nalcrest Foundation, Inc., a branch of the National Association of Letter Carriers (NALC), the union representing United States Postal Service city letter carriers. It was the brainchild of William Doherty, the first United States Ambassador to Jamaica and NALC President from 1941 to 1962.

== History and structure ==
Construction began in July 1962 and the community opened in 1963. Initially, due to HUD regulations, residency was open to both NALC members and others, but when the mortgage was paid in 2002, the HUD restrictions were removed and residency is now limited to NALC retirees in good standing only.

The community consists of 253 acres (1.0 km^{2}), 153 acres (0.6 km^{2}) of which are developed into 500 garden-style apartments. The remaining 100 acres (0.4 km^{2}) are undeveloped and include a manmade lake of 15 acres, around which the community is developed and connects to the 7,500 acre Lake Weohyakapka.

The apartments are a mix of efficiency and one-bedroom units, and all are on ground level. Units are leased on an annual basis and the rental rate includes water, sewer, trash removal, basic cable TV, interior/exterior maintenance, and use of the community's recreational facilities (but not electricity). Pets are not permitted. In addition to being NALC retirees in good standing, tenants must also be able to care for themselves and for housekeeping chores, as the community is not an assisted living facility and does not have an on-site physician.

Among the most interesting features of the community is that, despite being a retirement community for postal letter carriers, there is no home mail delivery – residents must pick up their mail at the post office in the Town Center.

== Activities ==
The community has a pool, tennis court, driving range, bocce and horseshoe pits, and a softball field.
