= Mark Danish =

American politician

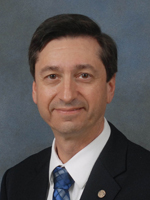

Member of the Florida House of Representatives from the 63rd district
- In office November 20, 2012 – November 3, 2014
- Preceded by: Seth McKeel
- Succeeded by: Shawn Harrison

Personal details
- Born: February 15, 1954 (age 72) New York City, New York, U.S.
- Party: Democratic
- Spouses: Rochelle Dworkin (m. 1977, divorced); Linda Danish (m. 1991)
- Children: Richard Michael, Lisa Michelle, Michael Jeffrey
- Education: City University of New York (B.S.)
- Profession: Science teacher

Mark Danish (born February 15, 1954) is a former Democratic member of the Florida House of Representatives, representing the 63rd District, which includes northern Hillsborough County, namely northern Tampa, Pebble Creek, Lake Magdalene, University, and Carrollwood, since 2012.

== History ==
Danish was born in New York City and attended Queens College, City University of New York, where he graduated with a degree in Earth and environmental sciences with secondary education in 1976. However, due to the fact that, in 1977, New York City faced a budget crisis and laid off several thousand teachers, Danish moved to the state of Florida and began work as a middle school science teacher. After a few years, he began serving as a union representative for the local teachers' union.

In November 2017, Mark's wife Linda Danish won $1 million in a Florida Lottery scratch-off game.

== Florida House of Representatives ==
In 2012, following the reconfiguration of the Florida House of Representatives districts, Danish ran in the newly created 63rd District. He easily defeated Z. J. Hafeez in the Democratic primary with 62% of the vote. He faced incumbent Republican State Representative Shawn Harrison in the general election, and a contentious election ensued. Despite praising Danish for his policy aims, the Tampa Tribune endorsed Harrison, noting that he was not an "abusive lawmaker" and instead was "conscientious and industrious." The Tampa Bay Times concurred, praising Danish as "a credible first-time candidate who knows this district well," but ultimately endorsing Harrison, praising him as "a moderate voice at the state and local level for his north Tampa constituents." Additionally, Harrison "out-fundraised Danish by nearly $200,000." Despite this, however, Danish emerged victorious over Harrison on election night, defeating the incumbent by 728 votes and with 51% of the vote.

Danish ran against Harrison again in 2014, though this time Danish was the incumbent and Harrison the challenger. The Tampa Bay Times endorsed Danish, praising him for his "willingness to work with Republicans on behalf of his district." Ultimately, Harrison unseated Danish with 53% of the vote.
