= Carrollwood (CDP), Florida =

- Census-designated place
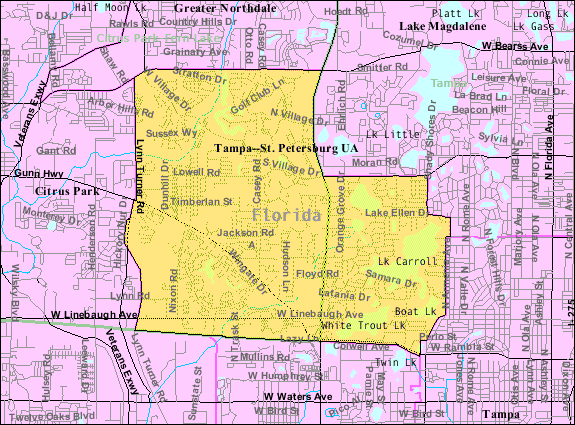
- U.S. Census map of Carrollwood CDP

- Location in Hillsborough County and the state of Florida
- Coordinates: 28°03′14″N 82°30′15″W
- Country: United States
- State: Florida
- County: Hillsborough

Area
  - Total: 10.27 sq mi (26.61 km^{2})
  - Land: 9.22 sq mi (23.89 km^{2})
  - Water: 1.05 sq mi (2.71 km^{2})
- Elevation: 46 ft (14 m)

Population (2020)
  - Total: 34,352
  - Density: 3,723.7/sq mi (1,437.71/km^{2})
- Time zone: UTC-5 (Eastern (EST))
  - Summer (DST): UTC-4 (EDT)
- ZIP Codes: 33612, 33618, 33624
- Area codes: 813, 656
- FIPS code: 12-10825
- GNIS feature ID: 2402548
- Website: www.carrollwoodvillage.com

Carrollwood Village Park with Carrollwood Pond in the background on September 5, 2026

Carrollwood is a census-designated place (CDP) in northwestern Hillsborough County, Florida, United States. The census area includes the unincorporated communities of Carrollwood and Carrollwood Village. For the 2000 census the area was enumerated under the name "Greater Carrollwood". A similar area was listed as "Lake Carroll" in 1970 and 1980; for the 1990 census it was split into the smaller Carrollwood and Carrollwood Village CDPs. The population was 34,352 at the 2020 census.

== Geography ==
Carrollwood is in northwestern Hillsborough County about 9 miles (14 km) north-northwest of downtown Tampa. The Carrollwood CDP is bordered by Citrus Park to the west, Egypt Lake-Leto and Town 'n' Country to the south, Northdale to the north and Lake Magdalene and Forest Hills (Tampa) to the east. The CDP borders follow West Busch Boulevard and a CSX rail line on the south; Anderson Road and Lynn Road on the west; County Road 582 (Ehrlich Road) on the north; and State Road 597 (N. Dale Mabry Highway), Fletcher Avenue, and N. Armenia Avenue on the east to the Tampa border.

According to the United States Census Bureau, the Carrollwood CDP has a total area of 10.3 square miles (26.6 km^{2}), of which 9.2 square miles (23.9 km^{2}) are land and 1.0 square mile (2.7 km^{2}), or 10.33%, is water. Lake Carroll, Lake Ellen, Lake Lipsey, White Trout Lake, and Boat Lake are in the eastern part of the CDP.

== Demographics ==
Historical population
Census	Pop.	Note	%±
2000	33,519		—
2010	33,365		−0.5%
2020	34,352		3.0%

Carrollwood racial composition (Hispanics excluded from racial categories) (NH = Non-Hispanic)
Race	Pop 2010	Pop 2020	% 2010	% 2020
White (NH)	19,934	17,266	59.75%	50.26%
Black or African American (NH)	2,296	2,304	6.88%	6.71%
Native American or Alaska Native (NH)	45	27	0.13%	0.08%
Asian (NH)	1,257	1,447	3.77%	4.21%
Pacific Islander or Native Hawaiian (NH)	12	8	0.04%	0.02%
Some other race (NH)	82	226	0.25%	0.66%
Two or more races/Multiracial (NH)	584	1,558	1.75%	3.37%
Hispanic or Latino (any race)	9,155	11,916	27.44%	34.69%
Total	33,365	34,352		

As of the 2020 United States census, there were 34,352 people, 14,528 households, and 8,960 families residing in the CDP.

From 2011 through 2015, the estimated median annual income for a household in the community was $62,266, and the median income for a family was $75,297. Male full-time workers had a median income of $50,575 versus $40,490 for females. The per capita income for the community was $35,090. About 7.1% of families and 9.6% of the population were below the poverty line, including 11.6% of those under age 18 and 7.0% of those age 65 or over.

As of the 2010 United States census, there were 33,365 people, 14,256 households, and 9,363 families residing in the CDP.

In 2010, there were 14,256 households, out of which 29.1% had children under the age of 18 living with them, 45.9% were headed by married couples living together, 13.1% had a female householder with no husband present, and 36.7% were non-families. 29.1% of all households were made of persons living alone, and 8.6% were someone living alone who was 65 years of age or older. The average household size was 2.36, and the average family size was 2.93.

In 2010, the community the population was spread out, with 20.7% under the age of 18, 8.4% from 18 to 24, 26.3% from 25 to 44, 30.3% from 45 to 64, and 14.2% who were 65 years of age or older. The median age was 41.3 years. For every 100 females, there were 90.2 males. For every 100 females age 18 and over, there were 86.8 males.

== Education ==
Carrollwood is part of the Hillsborough County Public Schools system.

The schools that serve the area are the following:

- Cannella Elementary School
- Carrollwood K-8 School
- Essrig Elementary School
- Hill Middle School
- Chamberlain High School
- Gaither High School
- Leto High School
- Corbett Preparatory School of IDS
