= Florida State Road 589 =

State road in Florida

State Road 589
- Completed section of SR 589 highlighted in red

Route information
- Maintained by Florida's Turnpike Enterprise
- Length: 67.5 mi (108.6 km)

Major junctions
- South end: I-275 in Tampa
- SR 60 in Tampa SR 54 in Odessa SR 52 near Shady Hills; SR 50 in Spring Hill; US 98 near Sugarmill Woods
- North end: CR 486 near Lecanto

Location
- Country: United States
- State: Florida
- Counties: Hillsborough, Pasco, Hernando, Citrus

Highway system
- Florida State Highway System; Interstate; US; State; Former; Pre‑1945; Toll; Scenic
← SR 586	→ SR 590

State Road 589 (SR 589), also known as the Veterans Expressway and Suncoast Parkway, is a controlled-access toll road near the Florida Gulf Coast. Maintained and operated by Florida's Turnpike Enterprise, this 67.5-mile (108.6 km) transportation corridor extends from I-275 in Tampa, north to Citrus County Road 486 near Lecanto. The Veterans Expressway was built to accommodate the increasing commuter traffic in the Tampa-St. Petersburg metropolitan area, with the Suncoast Parkway's first phase opening in 2001.

== Route description ==
=== Veterans Expressway ===
The Veterans Expressway extends 17 miles (27 km) from I-275 south of Tampa International Airport to Van Dyke Road in northern Hillsborough County. The southern two miles (3 km), between Courtney Campbell Causeway and Hillsborough Avenue (on the west side of Tampa International Airport), upgraded Eisenhower Boulevard to expressway standards with frontage roads, is tolled when entering southbound from Hillsborough Avenue, and when exiting northbound onto Hillsborough Avenue, else not tolled. North of Hillsborough Avenue, the remaining 13 miles (21 km) are tolled.

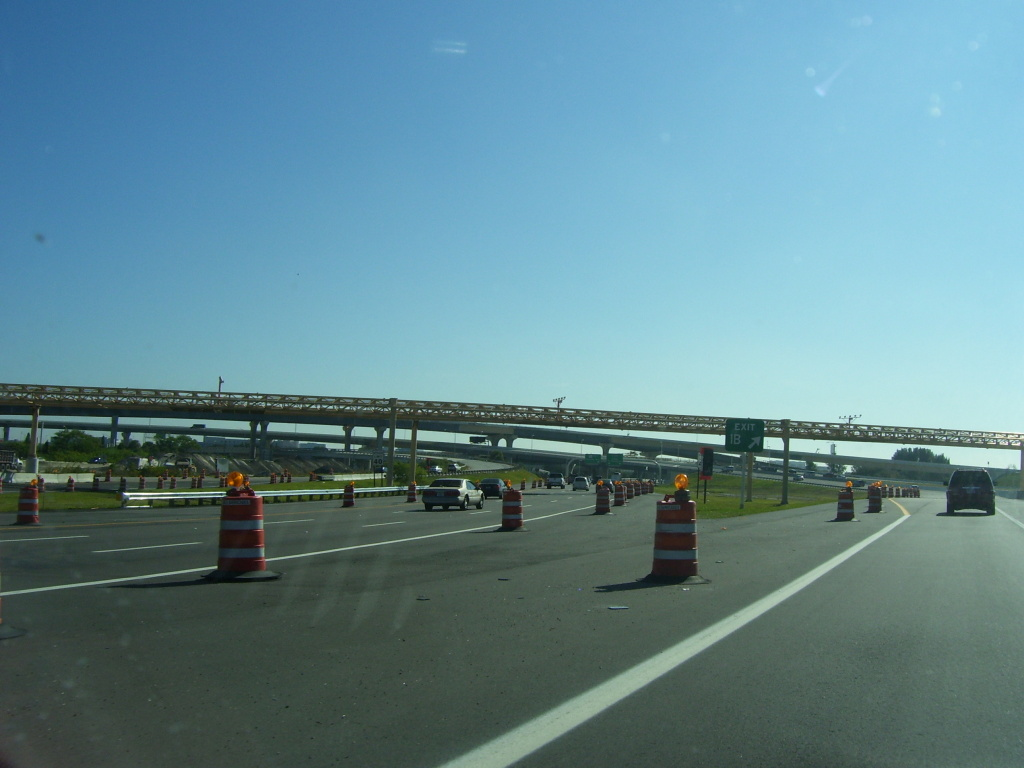
Interchange construction in November 2008. The ramp from southbound SR 589 to Tampa International Airport opened in September 2008. Note that the southbound exit is now numbered as "1B".

Between Courtney Campbell Causeway and Van Dyke Road, intermediate interchanges are provided at Independence Parkway, Memorial Highway, Hillsborough Avenue, Waters Avenue, Anderson Road, Linebaugh Avenue/Wilsky Boulevard, Gunn Highway, Ehrlich Road, Hutchison Road and Dale Mabry (known as the spur). There are two mainline SunPass gantries (Anderson and Sugarwood) and six ramp plazas. The Veterans Expressway converted to all-electronic, cashless tolling in 2014. Drivers must have a SunPass or they will be billed with TOLL-BY-PLATE. The "N minus 1" formula is used for multiaxle vehicles on all Turnpike facilities except for the ticket system on the Turnpike mainline and the T ramp on the I-4 Connector. N minus 1 may be calculated by counting the number of axles, minus 1, times the passenger car toll rate at each plaza.

=== Suncoast Parkway ===
The 55-mile-long Suncoast Parkway (SR 589) proceeds north from the Veterans Expressway to SR 44 in Citrus County, Florida, near Lecanto, then onwards to County Road 486.

The Suncoast Parkway was the first Florida's Turnpike Enterprise toll road to feature open road tolling. The three mainline toll plazas on the Suncoast Parkway originally featured bypasses where those paying cash remained on the mainline and stopped at the toll plaza while those with a SunPass or related transponder exited the mainline roadway, bypassed the toll plaza and then re-entered the mainline. This differed from later open road tolling locations in Florida where transponder users remained on the mainline to bypass toll booths built or moved to the side of mainline traffic.

The mainline tolling stations on the Suncoast Parkway were closed at 7 PM local time on January 31, 2020, making SR 589 a cashless toll road for its entire length.

=== Suncoast Trail ===
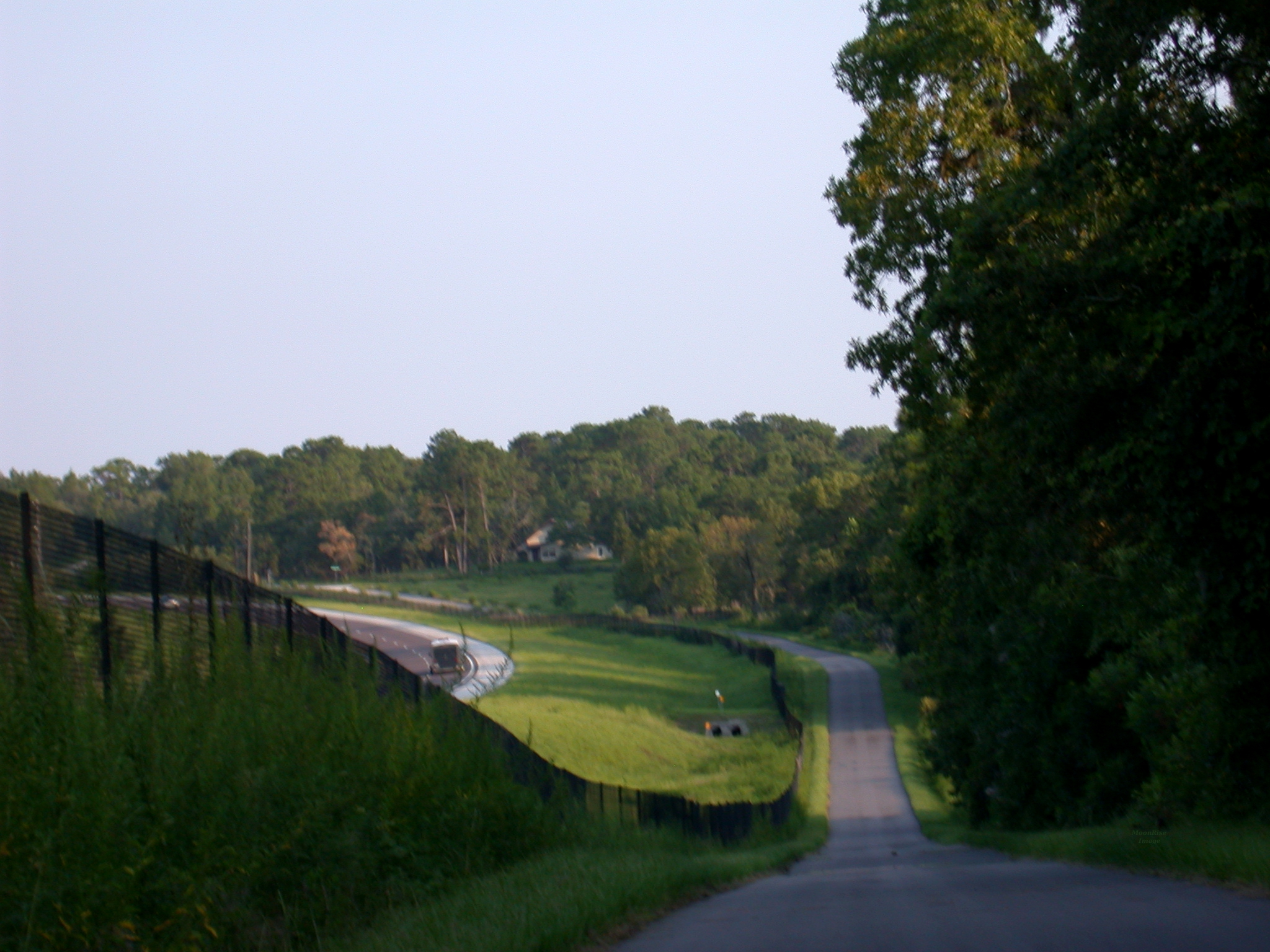
Scenic view along the upper portion of trail

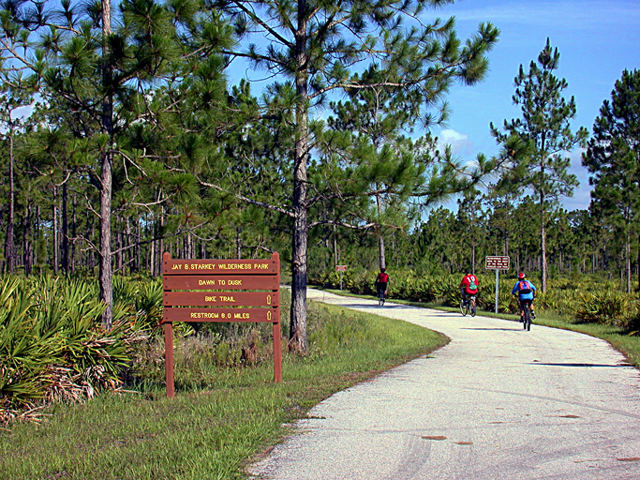
J.B. Starkey Wilderness Trail

As part of the Suncoast Parkway project, a multi-use paved recreational trail called the Suncoast Trail was constructed parallel to the western side of the highway, and opened along with the Parkway itself in 2001. The trail begins at Lutz-Lake Fern Road (Exit 16), and continues north for 55 miles (89 km) to the highway's Phase I terminus at State Road 44. Four miles north of State Road 54, an additional 6.5-mile paved bicycle trail connects the Suncoast Trail to the J. B. Starkey Wilderness Park in New Port Richey. Use of the Suncoast Trail is free, but in late 2010, a $2.00 parking fee was implemented at the Lutz-Lake Fern trailhead (Hillsborough County). At the same time, Pasco County implemented a parking fee, but it was rescinded in late 2017. Motor vehicles are prohibited along the entire trail, except for Park Rangers, and other authorized vehicles.

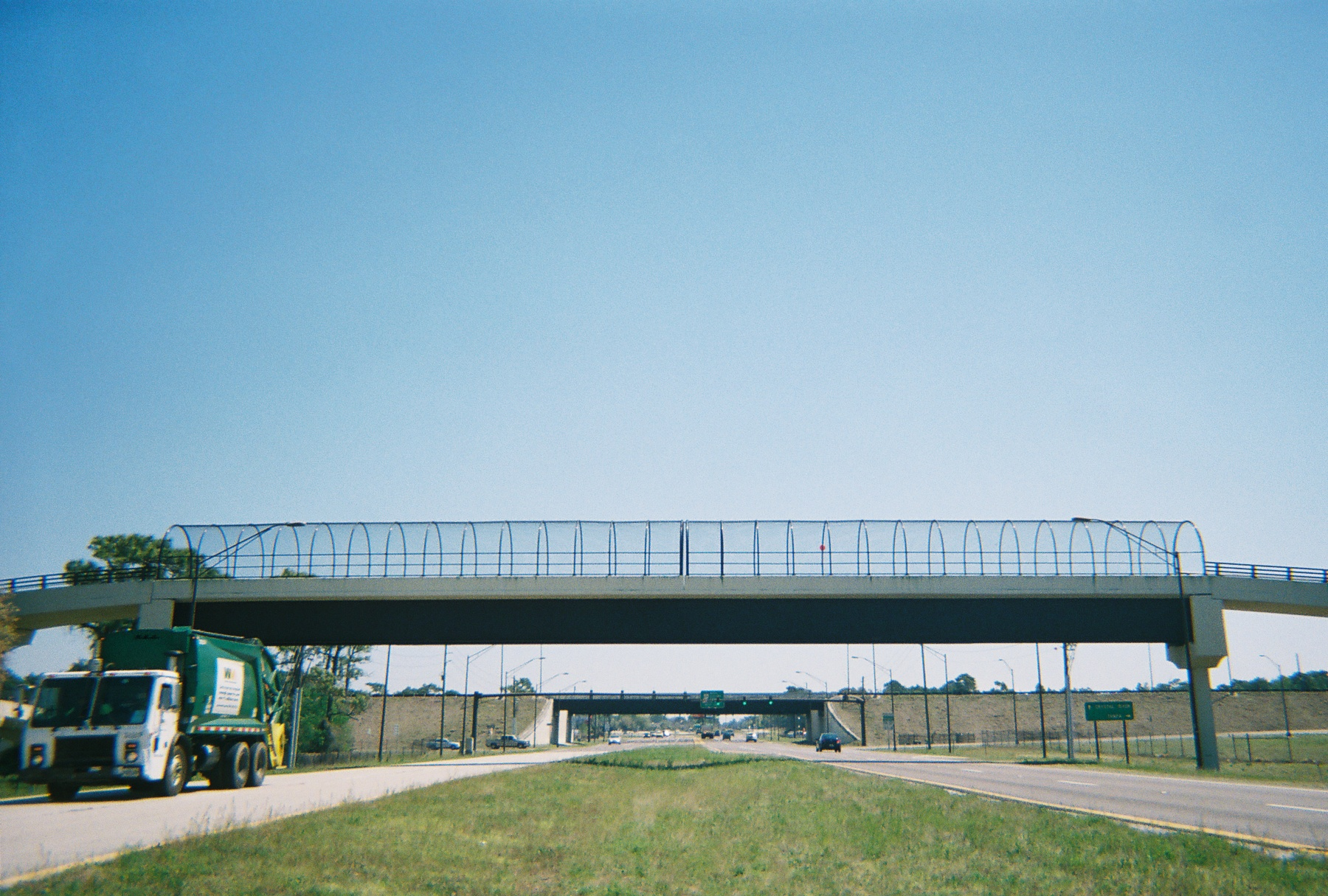
The Suncoast Trail bridge over SR 50 with the Suncoast Parkway in the background

For most of its length, the Suncoast Trail stays close to the parkway, separated by fences, grass, and in some places concrete barriers. Bridges that cross rivers and streams were built with enough width to accommodate trail users. Where roads cross above the parkway, particularly north of State Road 52, the trail briefly strays from the parkway, allowing users to cross the intersecting road at-grade.

Pedestrian and cyclist crossing of minor cross streets is regulated by posted signs. At busier intersections, pedestrian crossing signals are part of the traffic signal systems already in place. The notable exception is at the State Road 50 interchange near Brooksville, where a dedicated overpass has been constructed to cross State Road 50, approximately 500 feet (150 m) west of the main parkway.

== Tolls ==
The Veterans Expressway is an electronic toll collection and does not accept cash. It ceased cash collection in June 2014.

The Suncoast Parkway was the first of Florida's Turnpike Enterprise expressways to feature open-road tolling when it opened in 2001. However, unlike roads that were later converted into open-road tolling, the SunPass transponder users must use an off-ramp while cash users stay on the main highway route at toll plazas. During a resurfacing project in 2012-2013, the lanes were reconfigured, and signage modified, to give the outer SunPass lanes the appearance of being the primary route. Access to the booths on the inner part of the roadway, was reduced to a single lane.

Toll rates were adjusted statewide on October 29, 2017. In January 2020, the Suncoast Parkway stopped accepting cash payment of tolls, converting fully to SunPass and Toll-By-Plate.

== History ==
=== Veterans Expressway ===
The Veterans Expressway is the north-south portion of what was the Northwest Hillsborough Expressway, originally proposed in the 1960s as the northwest beltway around Tampa's outer limits. As the plans finalized, the communities along the route grew, leading to rising land costs and opposition to the expressway dividing the towns. Lutz was especially vocal, eventually rallying state politicians to cancel the expressway construction altogether. By the mid-1980s, the expressway was broken in two segments, the Veterans Expressway and the Lutz Expressway. In the early 1990s, the Tampa-Hillsborough Expressway Authority began to build the Veterans Expressway, but was depleted of funds, leading to Florida's Turnpike Enterprise purchasing the right of way using the existing design to complete construction of the expressway. State Road 589 was designated the Veterans Expressway in 1992 and was completed in October 1994.

From its opening in 1994, the Veterans Expressway saw very little changes in its roadway configuration. When the Suncoast Parkway was constructed in 1998 (through 2001), the Van Dyke Road interchange was reconfigured.

==== Former sections ====
With the completion of the Suncoast Parkway in 2001, the stub of the Veterans Expressway from Exit 13 to Dale Mabry Highway was designated State Road 568.

Originally, State Road 589 was concurrent with State Road 60 between Exit 2A and Exit 1, then extended to West Spruce Street and Boy Scout Boulevard. These roads were re-designated as SR 616.

South of the southern terminus, SR 589 was planned to be branched off onto the West Crosstown Expressway and become part of the Lee Roy Selmon Expressway, at the Selmon Expressway's Exit 4. The West Crosstown was canceled due to a freeway revolt, and the SR 589 and SR 449 designations were eliminated from the Lee Roy Selmon Expressway.

=== Suncoast Parkway ===
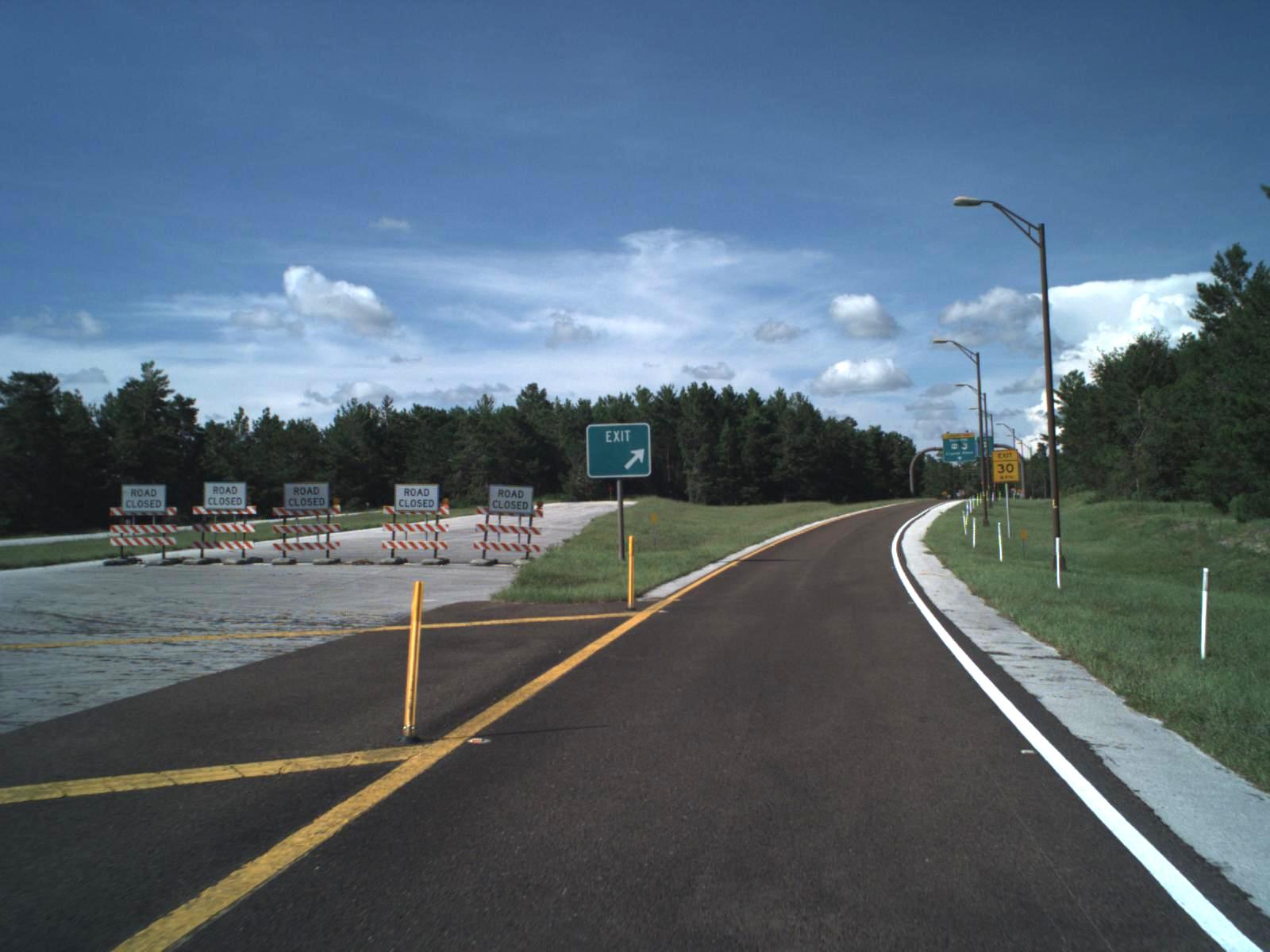
Former north end of SR 589 at US 19-98

Construction began on the Suncoast Parkway in 1998, and opened in 2001 in two stages at a cost of $507 million. The section from the Veterans Expressway to State Road 50 opened in February 2001 and the section from State Road 50 north to U.S. Route 98 opened in August 2001.

On August 18, 2006, the highway was formally designated as the Suncoast Scenic Parkway, making it the only controlled-access roadway to be an official Florida Scenic Highway.

=== Tampa Airport interchanges ===
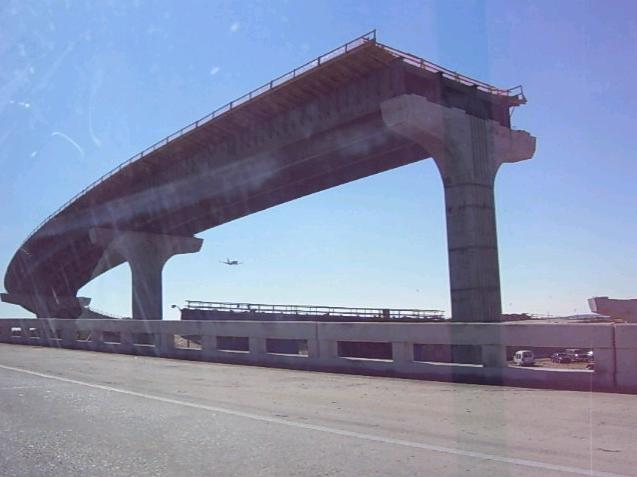
Construction of the flyover that now carries traffic from Tampa International Airport to I-275 north and SR 60 east

In August 2005, a massive reconstruction project began on the interchanges between I-275 and Memorial Highway, near Tampa International Airport after being shelved for over fifteen years. The project consisted of a four-level stack interchange at the Spruce St Interchange, a three-level interchange at the Courtney Campbell Causeway, and an extensive auxiliary exit ramp system stretching from Independence Pkwy to just north of I-275. The first phase, dealing with the northbound lanes to the airport was completed on March 31, 2010, at a cost of $202 million. The second phase, which upgrades the southbound lanes, is currently in the early design stages and there is currently no timetable set for construction.

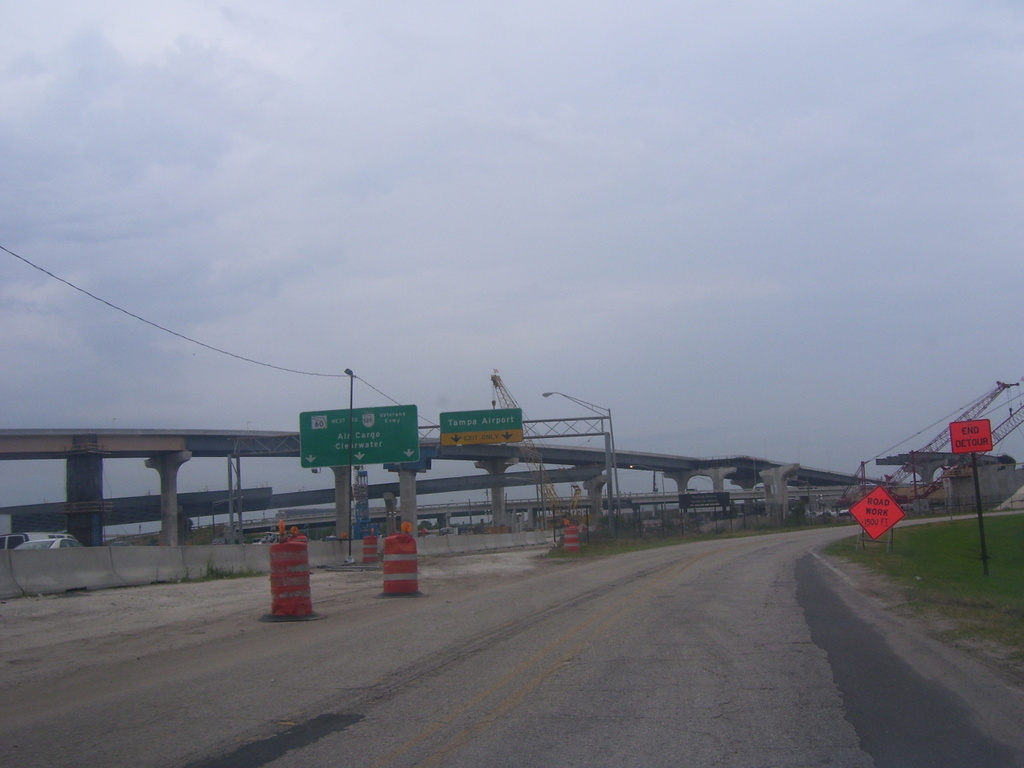
Interchange construction in early 2008; the flyovers from SR 589 south to TIA, SR 589 south to SR 616 (Spruce St), and TIA to I-275 south during construction

The project has resulted in better access from southbound Veterans Expressway to the Courtney Campbell Causeway on State Road 60, the Airport to I-275 and the WestShore Business District. According to the Florida Department of Transportation, the tallest flyover is 2,096 feet (639 m) long and 75 feet (23 m) high at its peak.

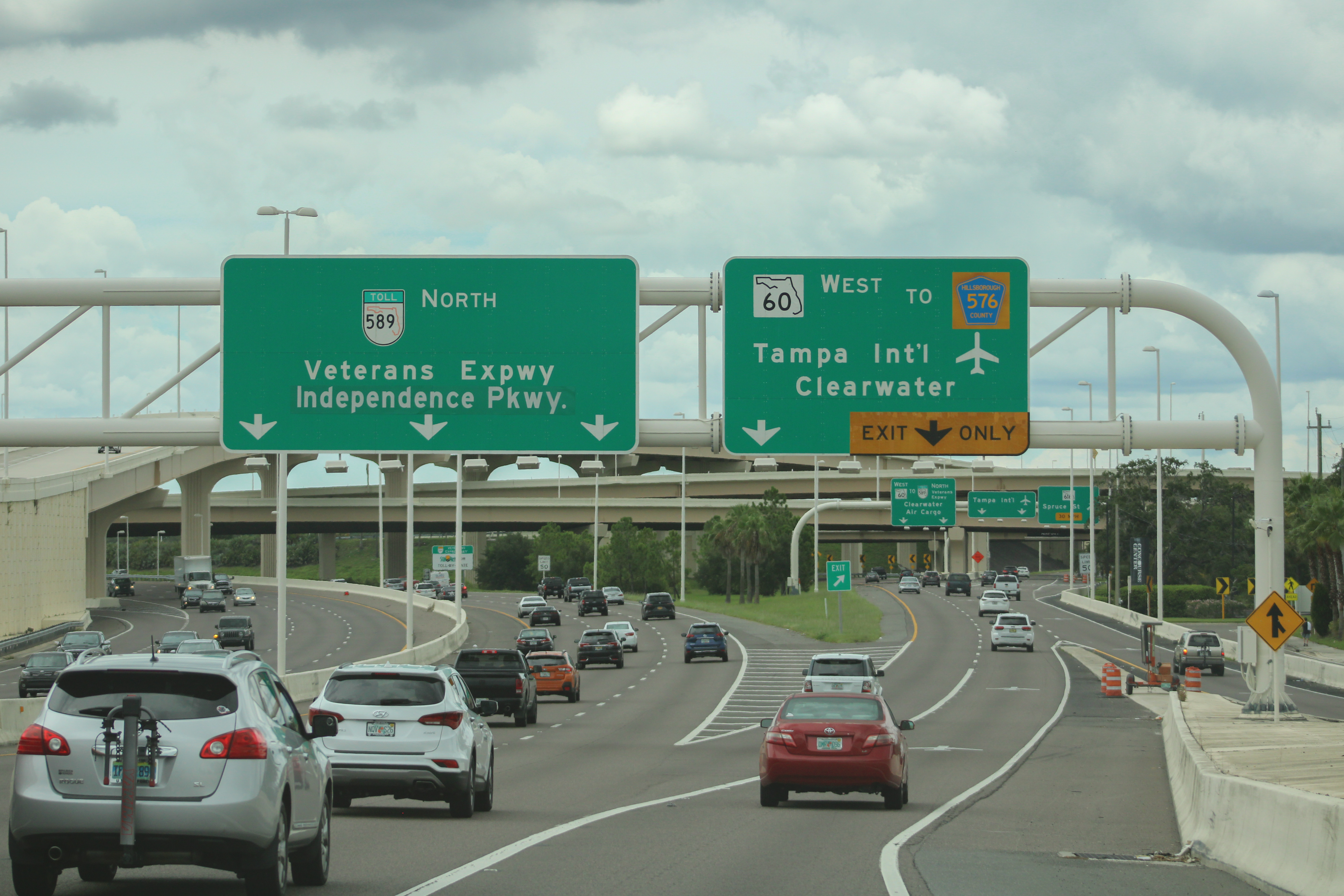
Tampa Airport interchange exit facing north.

As of August 2007, video cameras have been added on the road every 10th of a mile down the span of the toll road.

This improvement project, which began May 2013, widens 11 miles (17.7 km) of the Veterans Expressway between Memorial Hwy and Van Dyke Rd. The improvements, which are divided into five separate projects, double the capacity of the highway from four to eight lanes. Part of the widening improvements include reconstruction of 38 existing bridges and the building of three new bridges.

The widening project also includes a concurrent project to convert the section from Memorial Highway to Van Dyke Road to all-electronic tolling (AET), providing non-stop travel. In addition, the conversion of the Suncoast Parkway to AET will occur concurrent with the expansion into Citrus County, thereby providing enhanced benefits to drivers using the entire Toll 589 corridor. The project introduces Express Lanes (also known as Managed Lanes) to the region. A congestion management tool (which is already in place along parts of I-95 and I-595 in Miami), Express Lanes offer motorists a choice that provides an opportunity for a faster through-trip, with greater trip reliability and safety. All-electronic tolling is being implemented in segments while the widening project continues. This latter process began in June 2014.

The new Linebaugh southbound on-ramp opened in early summer 2015. The Anderson Road exit was reconstructed to accommodate widening the mainline roadway under the bridge. The southbound on-ramp opened in spring 2015, with the northbound off-ramp following by early summer. On the night of June 13, 2014, the segment between Memorial Highway and Gunn Highway converted to All-Electronic Toll Collection. On September 5, 2014, the segment between Gunn Highway and Hutchison Road was converted.

On December 9, 2017, the first phase of the Express Lanes, between Gunn Hwy and Hillsborough Ave, opened to traffic. The lanes will not be subjected to the variable rate toll until closer to the time that the second phase from Gunn Hwy to Dale Mabry opens.

While the reconstruction of the Veterans wrapped up in 2018, the Florida's Turnpike Enterprise still has not activated variable tolling for the express lanes. As of October 2021, the agency is converting the lanes to general-purpose "Thru Lanes", similar to that of portions of the Beachline Expressway. Lane dividers will remain intact, but signage will change to reflect the conversion.

==== 2020s Enhancements ====
On August 11, 2022, FDOT began an enhancement/improvement project aimed at adding an additional travel lane along the south end of the Veterans (westbound State Rd 60 overlap) from the Airport/Spruce St interchange to the Courtney Campbell Causeway interchange. The project also includes adding a left-hand exit from the northbound "outer lanes" to Independence Pkwy to allow drivers entering the expressway from the airport, Spruce St, and northbound I-275 direct access to Independence. Previously, only the northbound "inner lanes" had access to Independence - which meant that only traffic from southbound I-275 and Kennedy Blvd could access the roadway. Scheduled completion of this project is set for Spring of 2026.

=== Suncoast Parkway extension ===
An expansion project of the Suncoast Parkway featured a 13-mile extension from US 98 to State Road 44 in Citrus County, providing the Parkway's extension into that county.

The project followed a northerly route, paralleling US 19 and CR 491. Three interchanges were constructed: completion of the US 98 interchange, a new interchange at Cardinal Road and a partial interchange at SR 44. The extension is an all-electronic, cashless toll facility.

The extension was implemented under two separate projects let as design-bid-build contracts in 2016. Estimated project costs were $135 million, opening on February 28, 2022.

On August 25, 2025, Phase II of Suncoast Parkway, extending the route to County Road 486, opened.

== Future ==
The original expansion plans featured an additional 15-mile extension from SR 44 to US 19; however, this portion remained unfunded with no timetable for its beginning for some time. In January 2025, it was announced that the two final phases of the parkway expansion would be built simultaneously.

=== Possible extension towards Jacksonville ===
FDOT evaluated the possibility of further extending the Suncoast Parkway to create a seamless, limited access, tolled highway between Tampa and Jacksonville. The highway would be able to connect to I-75 either near the Ocala/Gainesville area, or near Lake City, then possibly I-10, the First Coast Expressway, and/or I-95 as it enters the Jacksonville metro area. Currently, those wishing to make a trip between Tampa and Jacksonville can use I-4 to I-95, I-75 to I-10, or various surface roads such as U.S. 301.

== Criticism ==
The Suncoast Parkway (both the existing route and the newly opened extension) has raised criticism from several opponents.

Citrus County residents believe that the extension would disrupt the quiet, undisturbed sections of Citrus County and bring forth more urban sprawl to the county. Furthermore, impacted residents fear that the parkway alignments come too close to their residences and will cause excessive noise and decreased property values.

Historic preservation groups oppose the extension as the planned alignment would essentially wipe out the Etna Turpentine Camp Archeological Site, which is on the National Register of Historic Places. In addition, a planned alignment threatens an underground water supply for the Homosassa Special Water District.

Furthermore, the toll estimates for the original Suncoast Parkway have fallen far below expectations (actual revenues USD$22M vs. USD$150M estimated), leading Tampa Bay Times columnist Craig Pittman to ask why an extension is needed on a road that has had far fewer users than planned.

== Exit list ==
County	Location	mi	km	Exit	Destinations	Notes
Hillsborough	Tampa	0.000	0.000		SR 60 east / I-275 – Tampa, St. Petersburg	Southern terminus; south end of SR 60 overlap
Hillsborough	Tampa	0.215	0.346	1A	Tampa International Airport	Exit number not signed northbound
Hillsborough	Tampa	0.236	0.380	1B	SR 616 east (Spruce Street) – Raymond James Stadium	Exit number not signed northbound; no southbound entrance
Hillsborough	Tampa	0.918	1.477	2A	SR 60 west – Clearwater	North end of SR 60 overlap
Hillsborough	Tampa	1.813	2.918	2B	Independence Parkway	Northbound exit and southbound entrance. For the northbound exit; the "inner lanes" ramp is situated on the right side, while the "outer lanes" ramp is situated on the left side.
Hillsborough	Tampa	2.155	3.468	3	CR 576 (Memorial Highway)	
Hillsborough	Town 'n' Country	3.123	5.026	4	SR 580 (Hillsborough Avenue)	Electronic tolling northbound exit and southbound entrance
Hillsborough	Town 'n' Country	5.167	8.315	6A	CR 584 (Waters Avenue)	Electronic tolling northbound exit and southbound entrance
Hillsborough	Town 'n' Country	5.776	9.296	6B	Anderson Road	Northbound exit and southbound entrance. Reconstructed in 2016. Electronic tolling
Hillsborough	Town 'n' Country			Anderson/Linebaugh Toll Gantry ($1.07 with SunPass, $1.34 with Toll-By-Plate)		
Hillsborough	Citrus Park	6.734	10.837	7	Linebaugh Avenue	Northbound exit and southbound entrance. Reconstructed in 2016.
Hillsborough	Citrus Park	7.332	11.800	8	Linebaugh Avenue / Wilsky Boulevard	Southbound exit and northbound entrance. Reconstructed in 2014. Electronic tolling
Hillsborough	Citrus Park	8.823	14.199	9	CR 587 (Gunn Highway)	Electronic tolling southbound exit and northbound entrance
Hillsborough	Citrus Park	9.766	15.717	10	Ehrlich Road	
Hillsborough				Sugarwood Toll Gantry ($1.07 with SunPass, $1.34 with Toll-By-Plate)		
Hillsborough	Northdale	11.699	18.828	12	Hutchison Road	Electronic tolling southbound exit and northbound entrance
Hillsborough	Northdale	13.218	21.272	13	To SR 597 (Dale Mabry Highway)	Florida State Road 568; Veterans Expressway follows this route; Northbound exit and southbound entrance
Hillsborough	Northdale	13.218	21.272	Southern end of Suncoast Parkway		
Hillsborough	Northdale–Cheval– Keystone tripoint	13.902	22.373	14	CR 685A (Van Dyke Road)	Electronic tolling southbound exit and northbound entrance
Hillsborough	Keystone	15.964	25.692	16	CR 582 (Lutz Lake Fern Road)	opened August 15, 2009
Pasco	Odessa	18.421	29.646	19	SR 54 – New Port Richey, Zephyrhills	Access to Medical Center of Trinity; electronic tolling northbound exit and southbound entrance
Pasco		21.2	34.1	Anclote Toll Gantry		
Pasco		24.9	40.1	25	CR 524 (Ridge Road)	Northbound exit and southbound entrance opened December 31, 2021; interchange opened fully on March 17, 2022; electronic tolling on northbound entrance and southbound exit; full interchange with access to complete Ridge Road Extension to US-41 by FY 2025.
Pasco	Quail Ridge	28.238	45.445	27	SR 52 – San Antonio, Dade City, New Port Richey	Access to Regional Medical Center Bayonet Point
Pasco	Shady Hills	32.0	51.5	Spring Hill Toll Gantry		
Pasco–Hernando county line	Shady Hills–Spring Hill line	37.017	59.573	37	CR 578 (County Line Road)	Access to Bayfront Health Spring Hill; electronic tolling southbond exit and northbound entrance
Hernando	Spring Hill	40.470	65.130	41	CR 574 – Spring Hill, Airport	
Hernando	Spring Hill	44.232	71.185	46	SR 50 – Brooksville, Weeki Wachee	Access to Bayfront Health Brooksville; electronic tolling northbound exit and southbound entrance
Hernando		49.2	79.2	Oak Hammock Toll Gantry		
Hernando		54.730	88.079	55	US 98 (Ponce De Leon Bouelvard)	Former northern terminus until February 28, 2022
Citrus	Sugarmill Woods	57	92	Sugarmill Toll Gantry		
Citrus	Sugarmill Woods–Homosassa Springs line	60	97	60	CR 482 (W Cardinal Street)	
Citrus	Lecanto	65	105	Lecanto Toll Gantry		
Citrus	Lecanto	67.5	108.6	68	SR 44 – Inverness	Former northern terminus until August 25, 2025; electronic tolling southbound exit and northbound entrance
Citrus	Lecanto	70	110	70	CR 486 – Crystal River, Hernando	Current northern terminus
Citrus				75	CR 495	Will be part of the Suncoast Parkway Extension Phase 3A to start construction in FY 2026; northbound exit and southbound entrance tolled
Citrus				Proposed Toll Gantry		
Citrus				80	US 19 / US 98 (SR 55) – Crystal River, Chiefland	Will be part of the Suncoast Parkway Extension Phase 3B; proposed northern terminus
1.000 mi = 1.609 km; 1.000 km = 0.621 mi: Concurrency terminus; Electronic toll collection; Incomplete access; Route transition; Unopened

=== Thru lanes ===
Thru lanes are separated from the general lanes with tubular markers, but all lanes pay the same general toll posted. All exits are unnumbered.

County	Location	mi	km	Destinations	Notes
Hillsborough	Tampa	2.155	3.468	SR 60 / I-275 – Tampa International Airport	Southern terminus of Thru lanes; Merges with mainline; Northbound entrance a mile ahead
Hillsborough	Citrus Park	7.332– 8.823	11.800– 14.199	CR 587 (Gunn Highway) / Wilsky Boulevard	Thru lane merges with mainline briefly; Gunn Highway signed northbound and Wilsky Boulevard signed southbound
Hillsborough	Northdale	13.218	21.272	To SR 597 (Dale Mabry Highway)	Northern terminus of thru lanes; merges with mainline
1.000 mi = 1.609 km; 1.000 km = 0.621 mi: Electronic toll collection
