= Shawn Harrison (politician) =

American politician (born 1965)

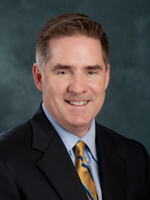

Member of the Florida House of Representatives
- In office November 4, 2014 – November 6, 2018
- Preceded by: Mark Danish
- Succeeded by: Fentrice Driskell
- Constituency: 63rd district
- In office November 2, 2010 – November 6, 2012
- Preceded by: Ed Homan
- Succeeded by: Redistricted
- Constituency: 60th district

Personal details
- Born: Shawn Edward Harrison; March 20, 1965 (age 61) Anderson, Indiana
- Party: Republican
- Spouse: Susan Harrison
- Children: Sarahcate, Ethan
- Education: University of South Florida (B.A.); Fredric G. Levin College of Law (J.D.)
- Profession: Attorney

Shawn Edward Harrison (born March 20, 1965) is a Republican politician and a former member of the Florida House of Representatives, representing the 63rd District, which includes northern Tampa, Pebble Creek, Lake Magdalene, University, and Carrollwood in northern Hillsborough County, from 2014 to 2018. Harrison previously represented the 60th District from 2010 to 2012.

== History ==
Harrison was born in Anderson, Indiana, in 1965, and moved to Florida in 1983 to attend the University of South Florida. He graduated with his bachelor's degree in political science and then attended the Fredric G. Levin College of Law at the University of Florida, receiving his Juris Doctor in 1990. In 1996, he was elected to the Tampa Palms Community Development District, defeating incumbent Bob Doran, and in 1999, he was elected to the Tampa City Council as the first city councilman elected to represent New Tampa since it had been incorporated into the city. Harrison was re-elected in 2003 to his second and final term on the City Council, and served as the Chairman Pro Tempore of the Council from 2004 to 2007. Upon leaving the City Council, he was appointed by then-Governor Charlie Crist to the Tampa Bay Area Regional Transportation Authority, a position that he held from 2007 to 2010.

== Florida House of Representatives ==
In 2010, incumbent State Representative Ed Homan was unable to seek re-election due to term limits, so Harrison ran to succeed him in the 60th District, which stretched from Lake Magdalene to Thonotosassa and Mango. He faced Ramon Stroud in the Republican primary and defeated him handily, winning 59% of the vote. In the general election, he faced Russ Patterson, the Democratic nominee and a retired United States Air Force officer. Harrison campaigned on a plan to create jobs in the state, supporting a regional transit system and declaring, "Florida's economy depends on quality job creation, and low taxes encourage job creation." He ended up defeating Patterson by a wide margin, winning his first term in the legislature with 56% of the vote.

When the state's legislative districts were redrawn in 2012, Harrison was moved into the 63rd District, where he ran for re-election. He won the Republican primary unopposed and faced Mark Danish, a middle school science teacher and the Democratic nominee, in the general election. Harrison earned the endorsement of both the Tampa Bay Times and the Tampa Tribune, with the Times praising him as "a moderate voice at the state and local level for his north Tampa constituents," and the Tribune calling him "conscientious and industrious" as a lawmaker Despite the fact that he significantly outraised Danish, he ended up losing his campaign for re-election by 728 votes, receiving 49% of the vote to Danish's 51%.

Harrison ran against Danish again in 2014, though this time Danish was the incumbent and Harrison the challenger. He campaigned on his experience creating jobs, calling for "job creators" to be setting the agenda in the legislature, and noting, "I know what it takes to start a business from scratch." Once again, Harrison won the endorsement of the Tribune, but was passed over for the endorsement of the Times, which endorsed Danish, praising him for his "willingness to work with Republicans on behalf of his district." Ultimately, the 2014 rematch was not as close or as contentious as the initial 2012 campaign, and Harrison unseated Danish with 53% of the vote.
