= Carrollwood Village, Florida =

- Unincorporated community
- Location within Florida Location within the United States
- Coordinates: 28°4′28″N 82°31′20″W
- Country: United States
- State: Florida
- County: Hillsborough

Area
  - Total: 11.7 sq mi (30.3 km^{2})
  - Land: 9.6 sq mi (24.8 km^{2})
  - Water: 0.69 sq mi (1.8 km^{2})
- Time zone: UTC-5 (EST)
  - Summer (DST): UTC-4 (EDT)

Carrollwood Village is an unincorporated community in Hillsborough County, Florida, United States. Along with neighboring Carrollwood, it is part of the Carrollwood census-designated place. The ZIP codes for the community are 33624 and 33618. Carrollwood Village was its own census-designated place during the 1990 census, with a recorded population of 15,051.

== Geography ==
Carrollwood Village is located at 28.1 degrees north, 82.5 degrees west (28.068, -82.521). The elevation for the community is 46 feet (14 m) above sea level.

Carrollwood Village boundaries include Gunn Highway to the south, Dale Mabry Highway to the east, Northdale to the north, and Citrus Park to the west.

== Areas in Carrollwood Village ==
Carrollwood Village consists of the following neighborhoods.

- Avista
- Banbury
- Bardmoor Place
- Belemere Apartments
- Bradcliff
- Bryn Mawr
- Buckingham
- Chardonnay
- Chattam
- Cloisters
- Clubside
- Country Club
- Cypress Clusters
- Cypress Run
- Cypress Trace
- Diamond Head I
- Diamond Head II
- Fairway Lakes I
- Fairway Lakes II
- Fairway Townhouses
- Golf Crest
- Greenfield Midrises
- Hayward Place
- Lennox
- Links Apartments
- Lytton Way
- Mid Village
- Monaco Garden
- Northampton
- Northmeadow
- Pepperrell
- Pinelake Garden Villas
- Plantation
- Rolling Green
- Somerset Stonegate
- Top-of-the-Village
- Turner Trace
- Twinlakes Village Cove
- Village Green
- Village Towers Wellington
- Village West
- Whisper Sound
- Windemere East
- Windemere West
- Wolcott

== Carrollwood Country Club ==
Along with the development of the housing community was the development of a 27-hole golf course, the Carrollwood Village Golf and Country Club. This course entertained some Senior PGA tournaments in the 1980s. The club changed names three times - first to the Country Club of Carrollwood in 2001, then to Emerald Greens Golf Resort & Country Club in 2003, then to Carrollwood Country Club in 2013. As Emerald Greens, all holes on the course were renovated or redesigned, a new club house and recreation center were built, along with Condos, Vacation Villas, resurfaced tennis courts and a new pool area. The name changed to Carrollwood Country Club to preserve the original history of the club, opening in the 1970s.

== Transportation ==
Some of the major roads serving the community are Dale Mabry Highway, Turner Road, Gunn Highway, and Ehrlich Road.

== Education ==
The community of Carrollwood Village is served by Hillsborough County Schools. High school students attend Gaither High School.

== Parks ==
Carrollwood Village Park with Carrollwood Pond in the background on September 5, 2026

Carrollwood Village Park has a playground, splash pad, dog park, and skatepark. There are also various activities such as fitness classes and fishing contests. The park has more than 300 trees from countries around the world, including trees native to Florida, flowering trees, conifers, and palms.

== See also ==
- Carrollwood
- Carrollwood (CDP), a census-designated place which consists of the communities of Carrollwood and Carrollwood Village
