= Shawn Harrison =

Shawn Harrison may refer to:

- Shawn Harrison (actor)
- Shawn Harrison (politician)
