= Curiosity Creek =

Waterway in Hillsborough County, Florida

Coordinates: 28.0851°N 82.4649°W

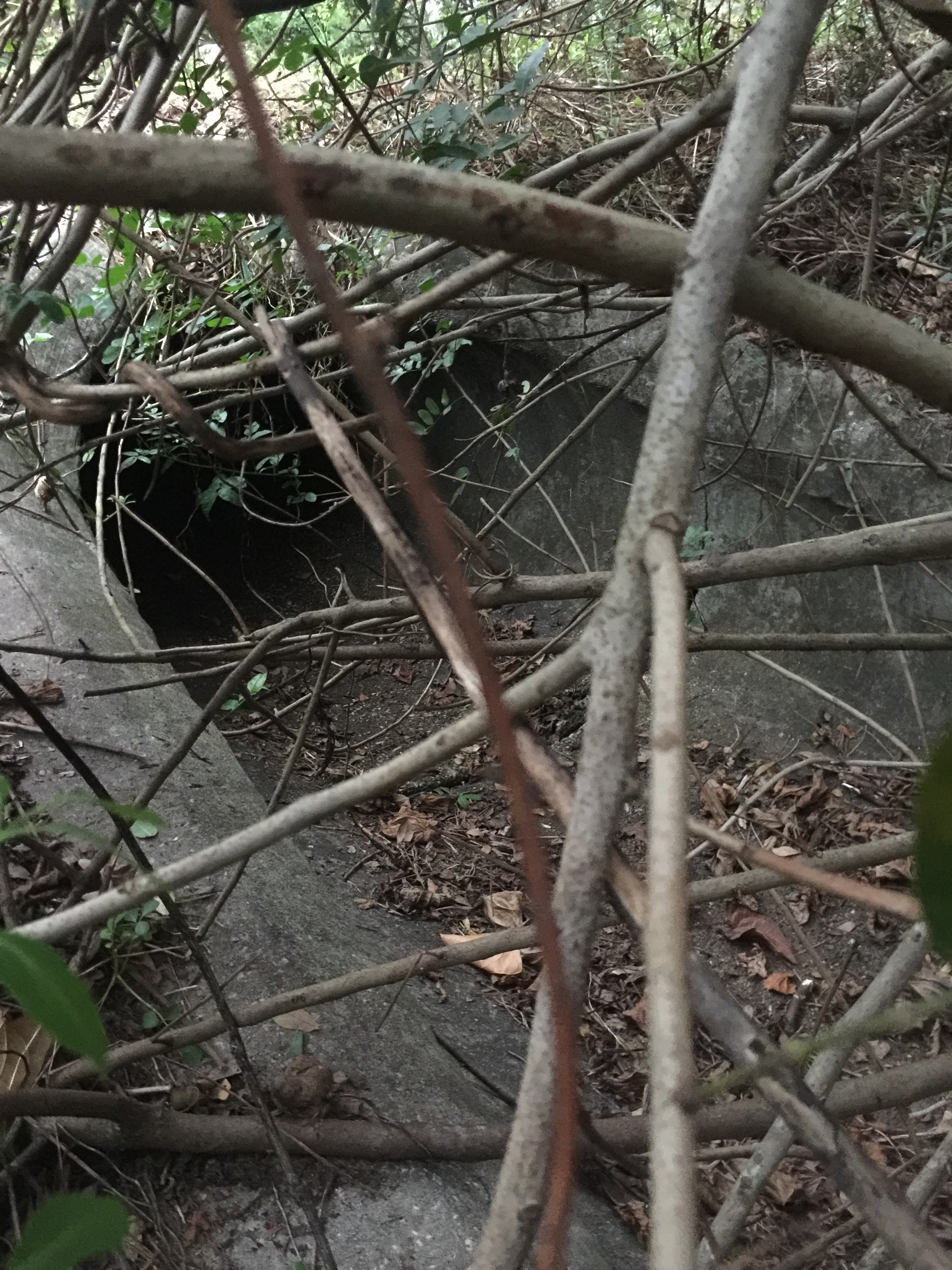
The drain in which Curiosity Creek flows northwards from. In wintertime, this drain is often dry and clogged due to a lack of rainfall in south Florida.

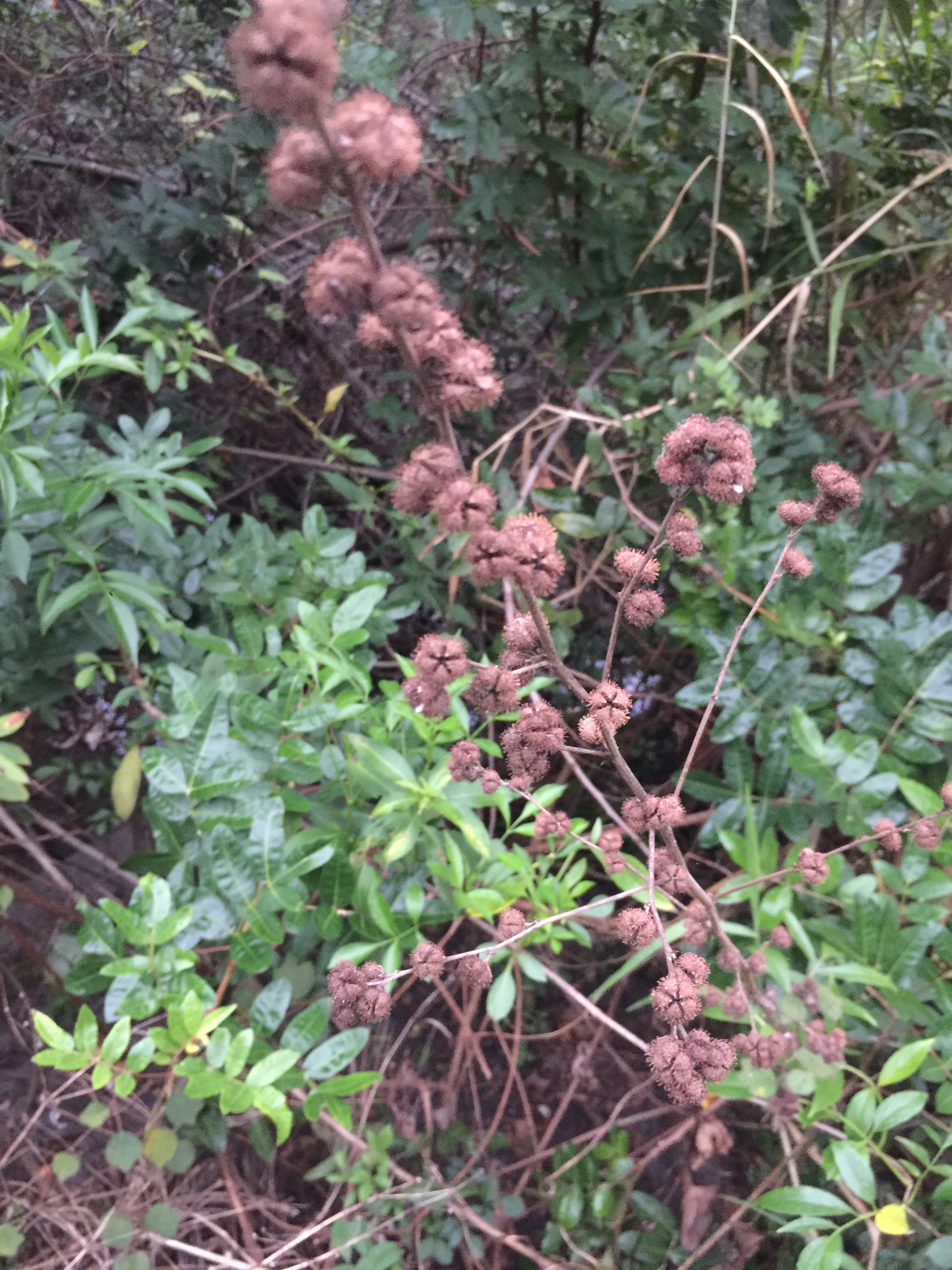
The Southern-most point of Curiosity Creek is home to a diverse ecosystem.

Curiosity Creek is a fresh waterway running through parts of residential and commercial Hillsborough County, Florida. The creek begins in woodlands by the neighborhood of Lake Magdalene, and runs north to Woodbriar Village. It is approximately 3.5 miles in length and ranges from two to ten feet in width. Its depth is approximately one foot. The creek forks three times and fills up once in a pond near Lake Gass, Tampa. Although running through private property, Curiosity Creek is considered to be a public waterway by the city of Tampa.

== Watershed Management Plan ==
Hillsborough County partnered with the Stormwater Fee Capital Improvement Program in late 2017 to fund the Curiosity Creek Watershed Management Master Plan. The funding for this project was priced at $150,000.

== Wildlife ==
Curiosity Creek is home to a diverse Florida ecosystem that includes plants such as serenoa, sabal palm, and cladium. Increasing pollution rates have disturbed the natural growth of the wildlife in Curiosity Creek, but cleanup efforts are helping the expansion of this wildlife.
