= Stevie Morgan (boxer) =

American professional boxer (born 1989)

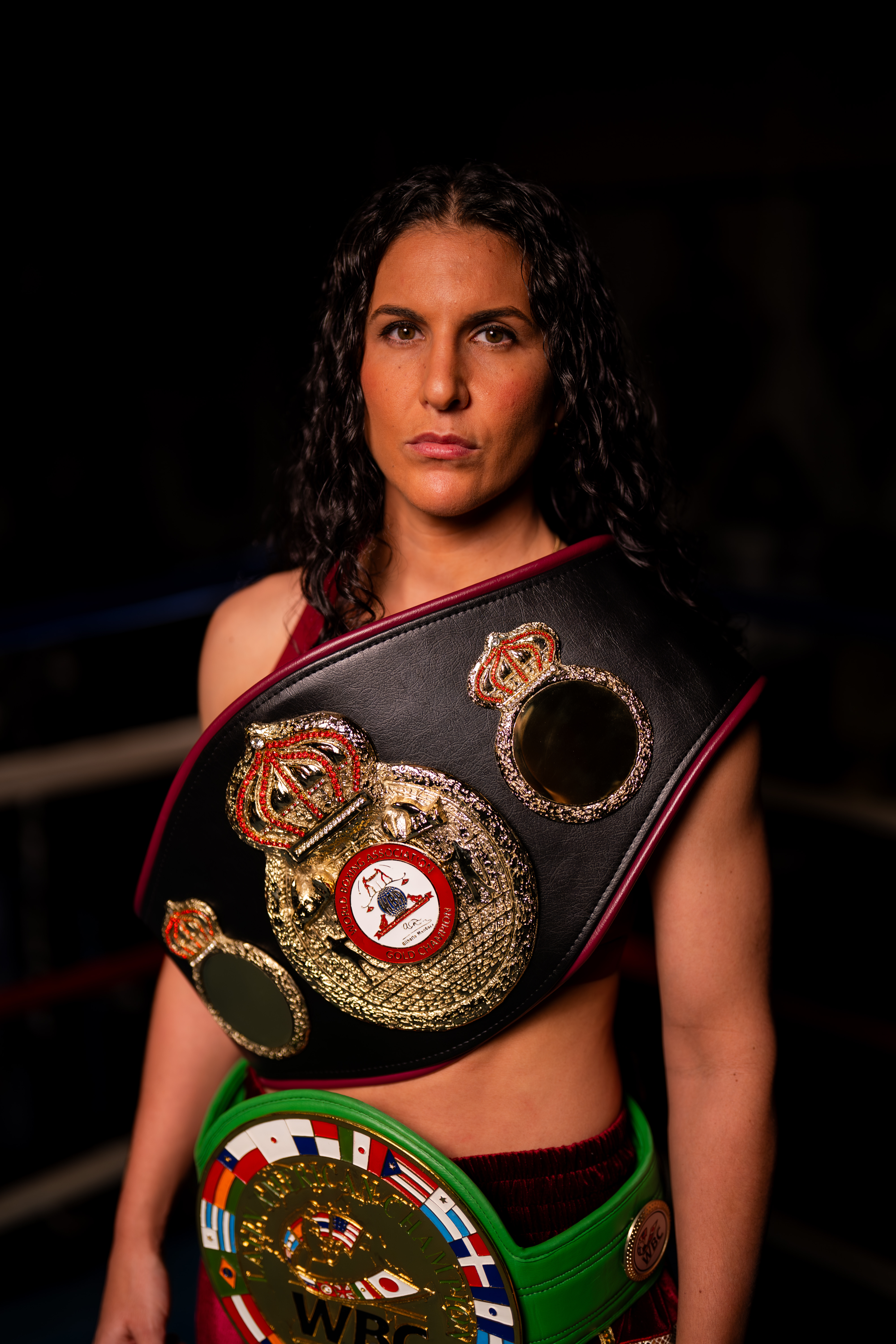
- Born: February 15, 1989 (age 37); Tampa, Florida
- Citizenship: American
- Education: Gaither High School
- Occupation: Professional boxer

Stevie Morgan (born February 15, 1989) is an American lightweight professional boxer. As of 2025, she is the WBA Gold Lightweight Champion. She won several other regional titles, including the UBO title, the WBF Intercontinental title, and the ABF Intercontinental title.

== Early life ==
Stevie Morgan was born on February 15, 1989, in Tampa, Florida. Her mother was born in France, and her father is from the United States. She played several sports in school, including track and field and basketball. She attended Gaither High School, after which she played professional women's tackle football for the Tampa Bay Breeze.

== Professional career ==
Morgan made her professional debut on June 18, 2022, in Memphis, Tennessee. She trains with Monyette Flowers at Flowers Boxing Lab in New Port Richey, Florida. With Flowers, Morgan developed her skills and became known for her power and pressure fighting.

In 2023, she won the UBO Lightweight Title when she defeated Lira Huyke. Morgan then defeated Paola Herrera to win the WBF Intercontinental title in 2024. The same year, she fought Amanda Serrano, the unified featherweight champion, in Tampa on the undercard of Jake Paul and Mike Perry, and lost in the second round by TKO.

After that fight, Morgan won four bouts, including on July 12, 2025 - winning the WBA Gold world Title after defeating Dominican Crystal Nova by 2nd round stoppage.

On July 24, 2025, Morgan was awarded the keys to the city of Tampa by Mayor Jane Castor.

== Personal life ==
In 2014, Morgan founded Cater Me Fit, a meal delivery company that employs over 30 people. The company operates Food Factory Tampa, a grab-and-go wholesale business at Tampa International Airport, and runs a nonprofit organization, SHE Boxing, which helps women and young girls.
