= Sugarmill Woods, Florida =

Census-designated place in Florida, US

- Census-designated place
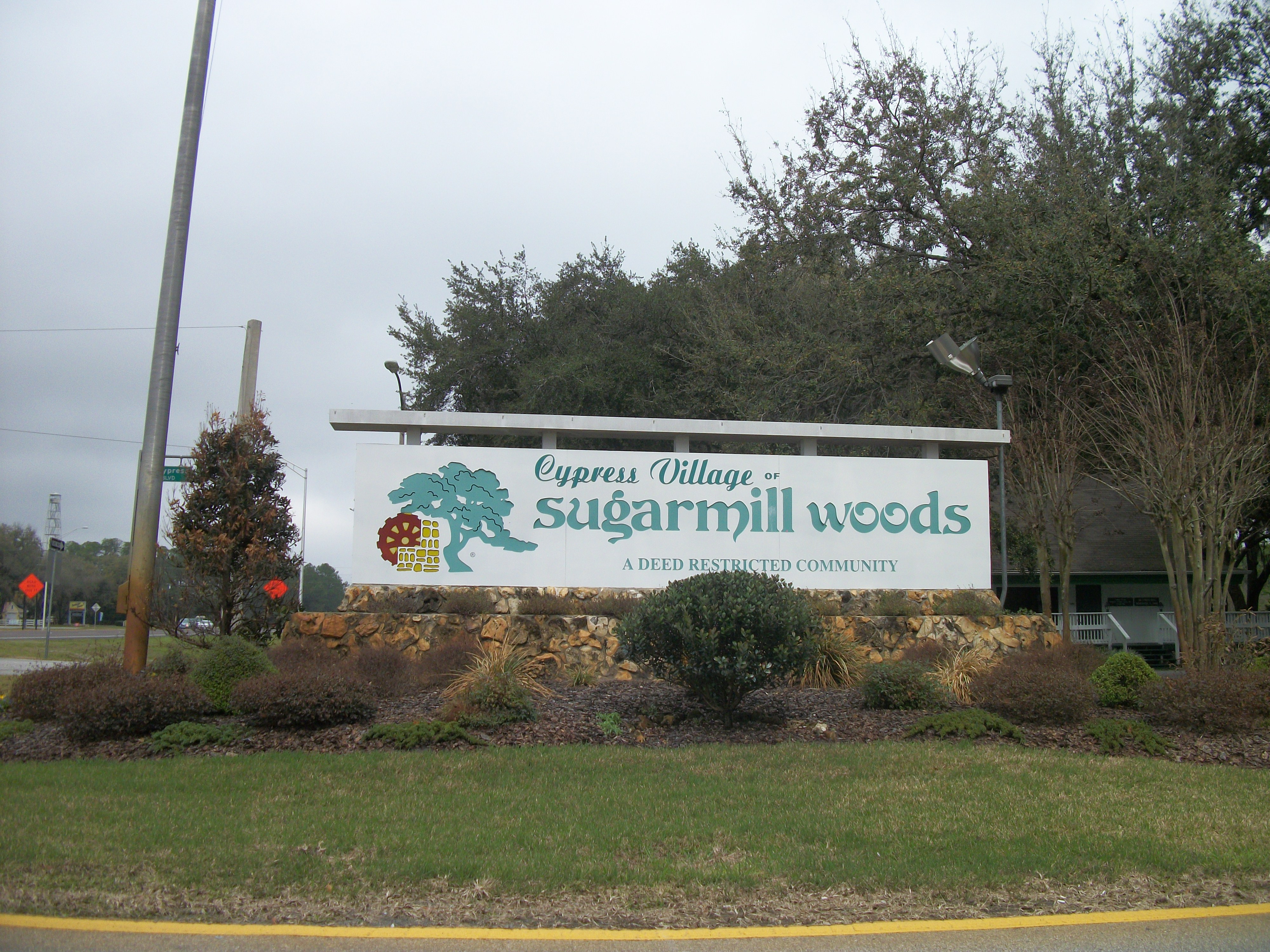
- The gateway to Sugarmill Woods on US 19-98

- Location in Citrus County and the state of Florida
- Coordinates: 28°44′25″N 82°30′02″W
- Country: United States
- State: Florida
- County: Citrus
- Established: 1972

Area
  - Total: 28.63 sq mi (74.14 km^{2})
  - Land: 28.63 sq mi (74.14 km^{2})
  - Water: 0 sq mi (0.00 km^{2})
- Elevation: 66 ft (20 m)

Population (2020)
  - Total: 11,204
  - Density: 391.4/sq mi (151.12/km^{2})
- Time zone: UTC-5 (Eastern (EST))
  - Summer (DST): UTC-4 (EDT)
- Postal code: 34446
- Area code: 352
- FIPS code: 12-68950
- GNIS feature ID: 2402899

Sugarmill Woods is an unincorporated, census-designated place (CDP) in southwestern Citrus County, Florida. The population was 11,204 at the 2020 census, up from 8,287 at the 2010 census. It is part of the Homosassa Springs, Florida Metropolitan Statistical Area.

== History ==
The name is derived from the Yulee Sugar Mill Ruins in nearby Homosassa.

The settlement was platted in 1972 by community developer Jim Sanders, with a concept of six villages: Cypress, Oak, Pinewood, Palm, Orange, and Meadow Run — each with its own village center. 24,000 lots were planned. The first nine holes of Sugarmill Woods Country Club's golf course, two tennis courts, and a swimming pool were completed in 1975. In 2023, Scott Yates took over the Sugarmill Woods Country Club golf course to restore it.

== Geography ==
Sugarmill Woods is located in southern Citrus County. It is bordered to the north by Homosassa Springs and Lecanto, to the south by Hernando County, to the west by US Highways 19/98 (Suncoast Boulevard), and the east by the Suncoast Parkway Extension (SR 589 Tollway) traversing the Withlacoochee State Forest. According to the United States Census Bureau, the Sugarmill Woods CDP has a total area of 26.6 square miles (69 km^{2}), mostly land, with the exception of several retention ponds.

== Demographics ==
Historical population
Census	Pop.	Note	%±
1990	4,073		—
2000	6,409		57.4%
2010	8,287		29.3%
2020	11,204		35.2%
U.S. Decennial Census

The CDP's demography is subject to seasonal migratory owners and their preferred registry locations. The CDP's occupancy increases significantly November through April.

=== 2020 census ===
As of the 2020 census, Sugarmill Woods had a population of 11,204. The median age was 65.1 years. 10.6% of residents were under the age of 18 and 50.2% of residents were 65 years of age or older. For every 100 females there were 93.2 males, and for every 100 females age 18 and over there were 92.5 males age 18 and over.

94.5% of residents lived in urban areas, while 5.5% lived in rural areas.

There were 5,273 households in Sugarmill Woods, of which 12.4% had children under the age of 18 living in them. Of all households, 59.5% were married-couple households, 12.6% were households with a male householder and no spouse or partner present, and 22.9% were households with a female householder and no spouse or partner present. About 24.9% of all households were made up of individuals and 18.3% had someone living alone who was 65 years of age or older.

There were 5,895 housing units, of which 10.6% were vacant. The homeowner vacancy rate was 2.2% and the rental vacancy rate was 15.1%.

Racial composition as of the 2020 census
Race	Number	Percent
White	9,947	88.8%
Black or African American	224	2.0%
American Indian and Alaska Native	28	0.2%
Asian	171	1.5%
Native Hawaiian and Other Pacific Islander	1	0.0%
Some other race	141	1.3%
Two or more races	692	6.2%
Hispanic or Latino (of any race)	595	5.3%

=== Demographic estimates ===
According to the US Census Bureau, in 2018, 1,507 residents identified as veterans.

=== Income and poverty ===
The median household income for the CDP in 2018 was $48,433, with 12.3% in poverty.

== Parks and recreation ==
Recreational facilities include:

- Sugarmill Woods Country Club - opened in 1975
- Oak Village Sports Complex - opened in 1984
- Southern Woods Golf Club - opened in 1992
- World Woods Golf Club - opened in 1994

=== The Suncoast Trail ===
The Suncoast Trail is a paved multi-use path (MUP) traversing the 42 miles (68 km) of the Suncoast Parkway (SR 589). Its northern trailhead is located at its intersection with US Highway 98, east of Oak Village. Planned for completion in 2022, the "Suncoast 2" project will extend the trail another 13 miles (21 km) and provide another access point for Sugarmill Woods at Oak Park Boulevard.

== Government ==
=== Owner associations ===
The mix of property types in Sugarmill Woods dictated that the main associations be designated as Property Owners Associations (POA) instead of Homeowner Associations (HOA). The POAs are Cypress Village, Oak Village, and Southern Woods. The Hammocks, Oakleaf, and Fairway Woods have their own recorded HOAs, while Cypress Run, Pinewood Gardens, Springwood, 3rd Fairway Condominiums I & II, The Villas at Beechwood Point, Pinewood and Fairway Run are condominium associations.

The POAs, certain HOAs and condo associations, administer and enforce their own restrictions and bylaws. They are typically structured to include a board of directors and several committees dedicated to the various concerns of the organization, such as Architectural Control, Rules & Regulations, Deed Restrictions, Common Areas, Finance, Public Safety, and Communications.

In Cypress Village, elected board directors are permitted to serve two consecutive 3-year terms without a maximum number of terms, while committee members serve at the pleasure of the Board of Directors by invitation, and without term limits.

=== Politics ===
Sugarmill Woods is located within Precinct 307 of Citrus County. In May 2020, Precinct 307 had 8,994 registered voters, 4,778 (53.1%) listed as Republican, 2,146 (23.9%) Democrats, 1,946 (21.6%) No Party Affiliation (NPA), and 124 (1.4%) Other Parties.

== Education ==
Sugarmill Woods is served by the Citrus County School District.

== Infrastructure ==
=== Transportation ===
Sugarmill Woods is served by Citrus County roads and US Highways 19 and 98.

=== Emergency services ===
A Citrus County Fire Rescue and Sheriff's Office precinct are located here.
