= Disappearance of Jennifer Kesse =

Florida disappearance case

Jennifer Kesse
- Born: Jennifer Joyce Kesse; May 20, 1981; New Jersey, U.S.
- Disappeared: January 23, 2006 (aged 24); Orlando, Florida, U.S
- Status: Missing for 20 years, 9 months and 25 days
- Education: University of Central Florida
- Known for: Missing person
- Height: 5 ft 8 in (1.73 m)

On January 23/24, 2006, Jennifer Joyce Kesse, a 24‑year‑old finance manager, disappeared from her home in Orlando, Florida. Her car was found about a mile away shortly afterward. Security footage showed an unidentified "person of interest" parking the vehicle and walking away. The individual could not be identified because of poor image quality, a fence obstructing the view, and the lack of distinguishing features. The disappearance received national media attention.

No arrests have been made, and Kesse's whereabouts remain unknown. In October 2025, her father announced that investigators had identified new DNA evidence and significantly narrowed the pool of suspects, and that the case is no longer considered cold.

== Background ==
Jennifer Joyce Kesse was born on May 20, 1981, in New Jersey, U.S., the eldest child and only daughter of Joyce and Drew Kesse. She was raised in Tampa, Florida. She has a younger brother, Logan. She attended Vivian Gaither High School in Tampa and graduated before enrolling at the University of Central Florida in Orlando, where she earned a finance degree in 2003. At the time she disappeared, she was working as a finance manager at Central Florida Investments Timeshare Company in Ocoee and had recently bought a condominium in Orlando. The weekend before she vanished, Kesse vacationed with her boyfriend on Saint Croix, U.S. Virgin Islands. After returning on Sunday, she spent that night at her boyfriend's home in Ft. Lauderdale, then drove straight to work on the morning of Monday, January 23, 2006, a trip of about 212 miles that takes roughly three hours.

== Disappearance ==
Locations
1 Kesse's apartment, Mosaic
2 Car found, next to a condo complex at Huntington Green Ct

Kesse was last known to have been seen when she left work at approximately 6:00 p.m. on January 23, 2006. She spoke by phone with her father while driving home at around 6:15 p.m., and later with her boyfriend at around 10:00 p.m. She normally texted or telephoned her boyfriend before leaving for work, so it was unusual when she did neither the next morning. His call went straight to her voicemail.

When Kesse failed to arrive at work, her employer contacted her parents, who began the two-hour drive from their home to hers. Her parents noticed that her car was missing but saw nothing out of place inside the home. A wet towel and clothes laid out, among other things, suggested she had showered, dressed, and prepared for work that morning. Friends and family distributed fliers that evening, and the Orlando Police Department organized search efforts on foot and on horseback, as well as by boat, helicopter, car, and ATV.

=== Timeline ===
Times are approximate and based on witness statements:

Monday, January 23, 2006

- 6:00 p.m. Kesse leaves work and calls her parents. This is the last time her family hears from her. She arrives home for the first time since returning from vacation.
- 10:00 p.m. Kesse and her boyfriend speak by phone and say their goodnights. He is the last known person to speak with her before her disappearance.

Tuesday, January 24, 2006

- 7:30 a.m. – 8:00 a.m. Investigators initially believed that Kesse was abducted as she was walking from her front door to her car. They now believe she left her condominium complex and was abducted at some point on her way to work.
- 8:00 a.m. – 9:00 a.m. Kesse's boyfriend, whom she would normally call but did not, phones her on his way to work. The call goes directly to voicemail. He assumes she is in a meeting she had mentioned. His later attempts also fail. Kesse's parents call him to say she did not show up at work.
- 11:00 a.m. Alarmed by her uncharacteristic "no call, no show" her employer contacts her parents, who begin the drive from Tampa to Orlando. On the way, they ask the manager of her condominium to check her home with a spare key. He reports that everything appears normal inside and that her car is missing outside.
- 12:00 p.m. Only 1.2 miles (1.9 km) from her home, surveillance cameras at an apartment complex record a person parking her car and walking away. The car and footage are not discovered until two days later.
- 3:00 p.m – 3.15 p.m. Kesse's parents and brother arrive at her apartment. They find evidence that she had been home that morning. They call the police. As Kesse is an adult, police initially hold she may have left voluntarily.
- 5:00 p.m. – 7:00 p.m. Family and friends distribute fliers with Kesse's picture. Police send a detective to her home and begin interrogations and searches.

Thursday, January 26, 2006

- 8:10 a.m. After seeing Kesse's car on the news, a tenant of a nearby complex informs police that it has been parked in front of their building for several days. Police confirm it is her 2004 Chevy Malibu. The vehicle is photographed and taken for forensic examination. Police review local surveillance footage and discover an unidentified person parking her car and walking away.

== Investigation ==
The person of interest who parked Kesse's car was captured by a surveillance camera that snapped a photo once every three seconds. To the dismay of investigators, all three captures of the subject in frame had the suspect's face obscured by the fencing.

With no sign of forced entry or a struggle, investigators initially theorized that on the morning of January 24, Kesse left her apartment for work and locked her front door, only to be abducted at some point while walking toward or getting into her car. On January 26, around 8:10 a.m., her black 2004 Chevrolet Malibu was found parked at another apartment complex about a mile from her own.

Investigators learned that the parking lot where the car was found was covered by several hidden cameras. The footage showed an unidentified "person of interest" parking Kesse's vehicle at approximately noon on the day she went missing. None of her family or friends recognized the person, whose physical features were unclear on the video. Despite extensive camera coverage and multiple snapshots, fencing around the lot obscured the person's face. The FBI attempted to determine the person's size and gender but could only estimate a height between 5'3" and 5'5", shorter than Kesse, who stood 5'7". NASA also enhanced the video.

A search dog tracked a scent from the parked car back to Kesse's apartment complex, leading detectives to believe that the suspect might have returned to her parking lot after abandoning the car. No other evidence was found along the route. A forensic examination of the car yielded little, only a latent print and a small DNA fiber. Investigators concluded that the car had been wiped down. Valuables were left inside, which led detectives to rule out robbery as a motive. Missing items included her cell phone, iPod, keys, purse, briefcase, and the outfit she was wearing. Authorities were unable to ping her phone, which remained powered off. Her bank account keycard had not been used since her disappearance.

Investigators first questioned Kesse's immediate family and close friends to determine whether any of them could have had a motive. Her ex‑boyfriend, who had recently wanted to reconcile, was interrogated but ruled out. Her current boyfriend was also questioned and eliminated as a suspect. At the time of her disappearance, Kesse's condominium complex was undergoing a major expansion, and many of the laborers on site were non‑English speaking. Kesse had told family members that the construction workers frequently catcalled, whistled at, and harassed her. Because of the language barrier, investigators were unable to interview many of them. No leads emerged from this group.

Detectives then focused on her workplace and questioned her coworkers. Her computer was taken for forensic examination. It was revealed that she had refused the advances of a manager because she opposed workplace relationships. Detectives interviewed him multiple times but ultimately ruled him out. Investigators and Kesse's family and friends remain open to the theory that she was a victim of human trafficking but consider it less likely than other possibilities.

In May 2007, Kesse's company, led by David A. Siegel, offered a $1 million reward for information leading to her whereabouts, with a July 4 deadline and the stipulation that she had to be alive. It was never claimed. A $5,000 reward for information leading to the recovery of her remains was available through Central Florida Crimeline. The case received state and national press attention at the time. On May 2, 2008, the Florida House of Representatives unanimously passed Senate Bill 502, "The Jennifer Kesse and Tiffany Sessions Missing Persons Act", to reform how missing-persons cases are handled in Florida.

As of June 10, 2010, the FBI took over the case from the Orlando Police Department at the urging of police chief Val Demings. In 2018, Kesse's parents filed suit against the Orlando Police Department to gain access to police records. The lawsuit was settled in March 2019, giving the family access to 16,000 pages of documents.

In December 2022, it was reported that the investigation had been turned over to the Florida Department of Law Enforcement (FDLE) cold case unit. The FDLE intends to interview people already identified as possible suspects or individuals who may have valuable information, and to retest evidence that the family says has never been retested. Kesse is still considered missing and endangered by the Orlando Police Department, FBI, Orange County Sheriff's Office, FDLE, NCIC, NCMA, and Interpol. She also remains on the FBI's Most Wanted/Missing List.

On May 20, 2025, coinciding with Kesse's 44th birthday, the FDLE announced that they had reviewed thousands of pages of documents and spoken to about 45 people since taking over the case. They stated that they had identified "several" persons of interest and that the case was no longer considered cold. They also said artificial intelligence may be able to identify the person of interest seen on camera shortly after Kesse disappeared.

On October 21, 2025, Kesse's father announced that the FDLE had found DNA within evidence that had not been previously tested, contradicting an earlier statement by the Orlando Police Department that DNA had only been found on the steering wheel. He also said that the list of persons of interest had been greatly reduced and that investigators now have a better chance of finding Kesse than in previous years.

In 2026, the FDLE stated that its agents "have been working diligently on reviewing thousands of documents and following up on new leads that may help find her. The investigation remains active, and FDLE continues to be steadfast in its pursuit of justice in this case."

== In media ==
In 2020, Fox News Investigates released a podcast on Kesse's disappearance, House of Broken Dreams: The Jennifer Kesse Story.

On October 21, 2025, Kesse's father announced that a documentary team would be working on a television series about her disappearance.

== See also ==
- List of people who disappeared mysteriously (2000–present)
