= Cheval, Florida =

- Census-designated place
- Location in Hillsborough County and the state of Florida
- Coordinates: 28°08′57″N 82°30′48″W
- Country: United States
- State: Florida
- County: Hillsborough

Area
  - Total: 6.79 sq mi (17.58 km^{2})
  - Land: 5.95 sq mi (15.41 km^{2})
  - Water: 0.84 sq mi (2.17 km^{2})
- Elevation: 62 ft (19 m)

Population (2020)
  - Total: 12,522
  - Density: 2,104.3/sq mi (812.47/km^{2})
- Time zone: UTC-5 (Eastern (EST))
  - Summer (DST): UTC-4 (EDT)
- Area code: 813
- FIPS code: 12-11912
- GNIS feature ID: 2402769

Cheval is a census-designated place in Hillsborough County, Florida, United States. As of the 2020 census, Cheval had a population of 12,522.

== Geography ==
Cheval is located in northwestern Hillsborough County. It is bordered to the east by the Lutz, to the south by Northdale, to the west by Keystone, and to the north by Pasco County. Florida State Road 597 (Dale Mabry Highway) forms part of the CDP eastern border, and State Road 589 (Suncoast Parkway) forms part of the western border. The community is 17 miles (27 km) north of Tampa.

According to the United States Census Bureau, the Cheval CDP has a total area of 6.8 square miles (17.6 km^{2}), of which 5.9 square miles (15.4 km^{2}) are land and 0.85 square miles (2.2 km^{2}), or 12.30%, are water.

Cheval CDP is made up of a few subdivisions but derives its name from the large gated subdivision that makes up the majority of the CDP. It is located within the boundaries of the unincorporated community of Lutz.

== Demographics ==
Historical population
Census	Pop.	Note	%±
2000	7,602		—
2010	10,702		40.8%
2020	12,522		17.0%

=== 2020 census ===
As of the 2020 census, Cheval had a population of 12,522. The median age was 40.3 years. 25.1% of residents were under the age of 18 and 13.8% of residents were 65 years of age or older. For every 100 females there were 91.2 males, and for every 100 females age 18 and over there were 87.2 males age 18 and over.

100.0% of residents lived in urban areas, while 0.0% lived in rural areas.

There were 4,978 households in Cheval, of which 37.1% had children under the age of 18 living in them. Of all households, 50.6% were married-couple households, 15.5% were households with a male householder and no spouse or partner present, and 27.7% were households with a female householder and no spouse or partner present. About 25.8% of all households were made up of individuals and 8.9% had someone living alone who was 65 years of age or older.

There were 5,204 housing units, of which 4.3% were vacant. The homeowner vacancy rate was 2.1% and the rental vacancy rate was 3.9%.

Racial composition as of the 2020 census
Race	Number	Percent
White	7,864	62.8%
Black or African American	811	6.5%
American Indian and Alaska Native	37	0.3%
Asian	1,221	9.8%
Native Hawaiian and Other Pacific Islander	8	0.1%
Some other race	592	4.7%
Two or more races	1,989	15.9%
Hispanic or Latino (of any race)	2,645	21.1%

=== 2000 census ===
As of the census of 2000, there were 7,602 people, 3,407 households, and 2,047 families residing in the community. The population density was 1,137.5 inhabitants per square mile (439.2/km^{2}). There were 3,659 housing units at an average density of 547.5 units per square mile (211.4 units/km^{2}). The racial makeup of the community was 85.86% White, 4.63% African American, 0.18% Native American, 5.01% Asian, 0.16% Pacific Islander, 2.12% from other races, and 2.04% from two or more races. Hispanic or Latino of any race were 13.02% of the population.

There were 3,407 households, out of which 30.5% had children under the age of 18 living with them, 47.8% were married couples living together, 8.9% had a female householder with no husband present, and 39.9% were non-families. 32.9% of all households were made up of individuals, and 6.3% had someone living alone who was 65 years of age or older. The average household size was 2.23 and the average family size was 2.88.

In the community the population was spread out, with 23.2% under the age of 18, 7.5% from 18 to 24, 37.5% from 25 to 44, 23.9% from 45 to 64, and 7.9% who were 65 years of age or older. The median age was 36 years. For every 100 females, there were 95.3 males. For every 100 females age 18 and over, there were 91.7 males.

The median income for a household in the community was $46,888, and the median income for a family was $65,960. Males had a median income of $45,551 versus $29,161 for females. The per capita income for the community was $32,444. About 2.5% of families and 4.9% of the population were below the poverty line, including 6.2% of those under age 18 and 2.2% of those age 65 or over.
