= Keystone, Florida =

- Census-designated place
- Location in Hillsborough County and the state of Florida
- Coordinates: 28°07′13″N 82°37′05″W
- Country: United States
- State: Florida
- County: Hillsborough

Area
  - Total: 39.14 sq mi (101.38 km^{2})
  - Land: 35.12 sq mi (90.95 km^{2})
  - Water: 4.03 sq mi (10.43 km^{2})
- Elevation: 46 ft (14 m)

Population (2020)
  - Total: 25,211
  - Density: 718/sq mi (277.2/km^{2})
- Time zone: UTC-5 (Eastern (EST))
  - Summer (DST): UTC-4 (EDT)
- ZIP Codes: 33556 & 33558
- FIPS code: 12-36462
- GNIS feature ID: 2403173

Keystone is an unincorporated census-designated place in Hillsborough County, Florida, United States. The Keystone area was first settled in the middle 1800s by the W.M. Mobley Family who migrated from Savannah, Georgia. The region has evolved from citrus and farming into a rural retreat of many lake homes and ranches. As of the 2020 census, Keystone had a population of 25,211. The ZIP Codes encompassing the CDP area are 33556 and 33558.

== Geography ==
Keystone is located in the northwest corner of Hillsborough County. It is bordered to the east by Cheval and Northdale, to the southeast by Citrus Park, and to the south by Westchase, all in Hillsborough County. To the west, Keystone is bordered by East Lake in Pinellas County, and to the north the CDP is bordered by Trinity and Odessa in Pasco County. Keystone is 22 miles (35 km) northwest of downtown Tampa. According to the United States Census Bureau, the CDP has a total area of 39.2 square miles (101.4 km^{2}), of which 35.1 square miles (91.0 km^{2}) are land and 4.0 square miles (10.4 km^{2}), or 10.29%, are water.

== Demographics ==
Historical population
Census	Pop.	Note	%±
2000	14,627		—
2010	24,039		64.3%
2020	25,211		4.9%

=== 2020 census ===
As of the 2020 census, Keystone had a population of 25,211. The median age was 44.8 years. 24.7% of residents were under the age of 18 and 16.3% of residents were 65 years of age or older. For every 100 females there were 97.4 males, and for every 100 females age 18 and over there were 94.8 males age 18 and over.

86.9% of residents lived in urban areas, while 13.1% lived in rural areas.

There were 8,699 households in Keystone, of which 40.9% had children under the age of 18 living in them. Of all households, 72.2% were married-couple households, 9.6% were households with a male householder and no spouse or partner present, and 14.2% were households with a female householder and no spouse or partner present. About 13.0% of all households were made up of individuals and 6.4% had someone living alone who was 65 years of age or older.

There were 9,351 housing units, of which 7.0% were vacant. The homeowner vacancy rate was 2.0% and the rental vacancy rate was 7.6%.

Racial composition as of the 2020 census
Race	Number	Percent
White	18,886	74.9%
Black or African American	820	3.3%
American Indian and Alaska Native	39	0.2%
Asian	1,893	7.5%
Native Hawaiian and Other Pacific Islander	15	0.1%
Some other race	532	2.1%
Two or more races	3,026	12.0%
Hispanic or Latino (of any race)	3,338	13.2%

=== 2000 census ===
As of the census of 2000, there were 14,627 people, 5,160 households, and 4,380 families residing in the community. The population density was 405.4 inhabitants per square mile (156.5/km^{2}). There were 5,709 housing units at an average density of 158.2 per square mile (61.1/km^{2}). The racial makeup of the community was 91.30% White, 3.50% African American, 0.34% Native American, 2.45% Asian, 0.05% Pacific Islander, 0.94% from other races, and 1.42% from two or more races. Hispanic or Latino of any race were 8.48% of the population.

There were 5,160 households, out of which 41.7% had children under the age of 18 living with them, 78.2% were married couples living together, 4.7% had a female householder with no husband present, and 15.1% were non-families. 11.1% of all households were made up of individuals, and 3.0% had someone living alone who was 65 years of age or older. The average household size was 2.83 and the average family size was 3.08.

In the community the population was spread out, with 27.2% under the age of 18, 4.8% from 18 to 24, 33.3% from 25 to 44, 27.1% from 45 to 64, and 7.7% who were 65 years of age or older. The median age was 38 years. For every 100 females, there were 100.4 males. For every 100 females age 18 and over, there were 97.9 males.

The median income for a household in the community was $80,677, and the median income for a family was $84,592 (these figures had risen to $106,549 and $112,119 respectively as of a 2007 estimate). Males had a median income of $55,905 versus $37,190 for females. The per capita income for the community was $35,136. About 1.4% of families and 2.4% of the population were below the poverty line, including 2.7% of those under age 18 and 5.4% of those age 65 or over.

== Schools ==
Keystone is served by Hillsborough County Public Schools through the following:

- Bryant Elementary School
- Hammond Elementary School
- Northwest Elementary School
- McKitrick Elementary School
- Farnell Middle School
- Martinez Middle School
- Walker Middle School
- Steinbrenner High School
