= Nowatney, Florida =

Unincorporated community in Florida, US

- Unincorporated community
- Location within Florida Location within the United States
- Coordinates: 28°4′25″N 82°26′49″W
- Country: United States
- State: Florida
- County: Hillsborough
- Time zone: UTC-5 (Eastern (EST))
  - Summer (DST): UTC-4 (EDT)

Nowatney is an unincorporated community in northern Hillsborough County, Florida, United States. The community is within the census-designated place of University.

== Education ==
The community of Nowatney is served by Hillsborough County Schools.
