= Gaither High School =

Public high school in Florida, United States

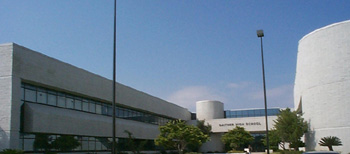

Location
- 16200 North Dale Mabry Highway; Tampa, Florida 33618; United States; 28°06′11″N 82°30′14″W

Information
- Type: Public high school
- Motto: "Commitment to Excellence"
- Established: 1984
- School district: Hillsborough County Public Schools
- Superintendent: Van Ayers
- Principal: Dr. Jeremy D. Klein
- Teaching staff: 97.50 (FTE)
- Grades: 9–12
- Enrollment: 2,078 (2023-2024)
- Student to teacher ratio: 21.31
- Colors: Silver, white, and blue
- Nickname: Cowboys
- Rival: Steinbrenner High School
- Newspaper: The Pony Express
- Yearbook: Silver Star
- Feeder schools: Ben Hill Middle School, Buchanan Middle School, Walker Middle School
- Website: www.hillsboroughschools.org/o/gaither

Gaither High School is a public high school located in the Northdale area of Hillsborough County, Florida, United States. It opened in 1984 and is located on 16200 North Dale Mabry Highway. Bloomingdale High School in Valrico, Florida, was built around the same time and has the same architectural design.

The school serves the communities of Northdale, Carrollwood Village, Lake Magdalene, and other parts of northern Hillsborough County, such as Avila and parts of southern Lutz.

== History and traditions ==
When Gaither first opened up its doors in 1984–85, seniors were not in attendance, and the school served only 9th–11th graders. (Gaither did not have a class of 1985.) In the 1985–86 year (class of 1989), Gaither kept its doors open to 9th graders. The following year in 1986–87, Gaither ceased to include 9th graders and began to only house the 10th–12th grades until 1997, when Gaither reinstated a four-year program. Gaither's graduating class of 1988 was the very first group of students that included all four years.

On January 31, 2009, Gaither High School hosted the seventh annual Snoop Bowl, a youth football game which puts a youth team coached by Snoop Dogg against a youth team coached by an NFL player in conjunction with the Super Bowl, which was in Tampa.

Each year, the school hosts a Special Olympics and a Multicultural Assembly. The school's homecoming is called Starlight.

== Athletics ==
Gaither offers a variety of seasonal sports for student participation. Sports for both boys and girls include cross country, golf, swimming, volleyball, basketball, soccer, tennis and track. Hockey players attending Gaither play for Freedom High School . In addition, boys sports include baseball, wrestling and football while girls compete in softball, flag football and competitive cheer. In certain situations girls may compete on boys teams that do not have a comparable girls team; this typically is found in wrestling, and more rarely in football and baseball. Gaither's main rivals are Steinbrenner High School and Sickles High School.

== Demographics ==
As of 2020, Gaither High School was 44% Hispanic, 37.6% White, 10.4% Black, 3.8% Asian, 3.7% Multi-racial, 0.3% American Indian and 0.1% Pacific Islander.

== Notable alumni ==
- Eddie Ababio, Major League Soccer player
- Adam Bilzerian, winner of the 2009 World Series of Poker
- Dan Bilzerian, internet personality and professional poker player
- Kevin Cash, Major League Baseball catcher and current Tampa Bay Rays manager
- Fernando Gonzalez, North American Soccer League player
- Donovan Jennings, NFL offensive guard for the Green Bay Packers
- Jennifer Kesse, missing person
- Alex McGough, NFL quarterback for the Seattle Seahawks
- Oscar Mercado, baseball player
- Carlton Mitchell, NFL wide receiver for the Atlanta Falcons
- Jordan Oladokun, NFL cornerback for the Los Angeles Chargers
- Amani Oruwariye, NFL cornerback for the Detroit Lions
- Lydell Ross, NCAA Football National Champion (2002 - Ohio State), NFL Running Back (San Diego Chargers)
- J.R. Russell, NFL wide receiver
- Brittany Snow, actress
- Jenn Sterger, sports reporter and model
- Kaleb Stewart, musician
- Channing Tatum, actor (transferred to and graduated from Tampa Catholic High School)
- Jackie Toledo, politician
- Eugene Wilson III, Florida Gators wide receiver
- Chad Zerbe, San Francisco Giants relief pitcher
