= Citrus Park, Florida =

- Census-designated place
- Location in Hillsborough County and the state of Florida
- Coordinates: 28°04′23″N 82°33′46″W
- Country: United States
- State: Florida
- County: Hillsborough

Area
  - Total: 10.82 sq mi (28.02 km^{2})
  - Land: 10.17 sq mi (26.33 km^{2})
  - Water: 0.66 sq mi (1.70 km^{2})
- Elevation: 26 ft (7.9 m)

Population (2020)
  - Total: 28,178
  - Density: 2,772.3/sq mi (1,070.38/km^{2})
- Time zone: UTC-5 (Eastern (EST))
  - Summer (DST): UTC-4 (EDT)
- Zip code: 33625
- Area code: 813
- FIPS code: 12-12425
- GNIS feature ID: 2402776

Citrus Park is an unincorporated census-designated place in Hillsborough County, Florida, United States. The population was 28,178 at the 2020 census, up from 24,252 at the 2010 census.

== Geography ==
Citrus Park is located in northwestern Hillsborough County approximately 15 miles (24 km) northwest of Tampa. It is bordered to the north by Keystone, to the northeast by Northdale, to the east by Carrollwood, to the south by Town 'n' Country, and to the west by Westchase. Florida State Road 589 (Veterans Expressway) crosses the CDP from north to south.

According to the United States Census Bureau, the Citrus Park CDP has a total area of 10.8 square miles (28.0 km^{2}), of which 10.2 square miles (26.3 km^{2}) are land and 0.66 square miles (1.7 km^{2}), or 6.08%, are water.

== Schools ==
High schools (grades 9-12) serving Citrus Park are Sickles (public), Citrus Park Christian School (private-Baptist) and Hope Christian School (private-Baptist).

Middle schools (grades 6-8) serving Citrus Park are Sgt. Smith (public), Walker (public), Tampa Day School (private), Citrus Park Christian School (private-Baptist) and Hope Christian School (private-boarding-Baptist).

Elementary schools (grades K-5) serving Citrus Park are Citrus Park (public), Northwest (public), Bellamy (public), Tampa Day School (private), Citrus Park Christian School (private-Baptist) and Hope Christian School (private-boarding-Baptist).

== Demographics ==
Historical population
| Census | Pop. | Note | %± |
|---|---|---|---|
| 2000 | 20,226 | | — |
| 2010 | 24,252 | | 19.9% |
| 2020 | 28,178 | | 16.2% |

=== 2020 census ===
As of the 2020 census, Citrus Park had a population of 28,178. The median age was 40.0 years. 20.9% of residents were under the age of 18 and 14.7% of residents were 65 years of age or older. For every 100 females there were 91.4 males, and for every 100 females age 18 and over there were 87.4 males age 18 and over.

100.0% of residents lived in urban areas, while 0.0% lived in rural areas.

There were 10,891 households in Citrus Park, of which 31.6% had children under the age of 18 living in them. Of all households, 47.5% were married-couple households, 15.9% were households with a male householder and no spouse or partner present, and 28.5% were households with a female householder and no spouse or partner present. About 23.7% of all households were made up of individuals and 8.1% had someone living alone who was 65 years of age or older. The community contained 6,617 families.

There were 11,406 housing units, of which 4.5% were vacant. The homeowner vacancy rate was 1.9% and the rental vacancy rate was 5.5%.

Citrus Park racial composition as of 2020 (NH = Non-Hispanic) (Note: Note: the US Census treats Hispanic/Latino as an ethnic category. This table excludes Latinos from the racial categories and assigns them to a separate category. Hispanics/Latinos can be of any race.)
| Race | Number | Percentage |
|---|---|---|
| White (NH) | 11,970 | 42.48% |
| Black or African American (NH) | 2,021 | 7.17% |
| Native American or Alaska Native (NH) | 26 | 0.09% |
| Asian (NH) | 1,818 | 6.45% |
| Pacific Islander (NH) | 10 | 0.04% |
| Some Other Race (NH) | 249 | 0.88% |
| Mixed/Multi-Racial (NH) | 1,064 | 3.78% |
| Hispanic or Latino | 11,020 | 39.11% |
| Total | 28,178 | |

Racial composition as of the 2020 census
| Race | Number | Percent |
|---|---|---|
| White | 14,623 | 51.9% |
| Black or African American | 2,238 | 7.9% |
| American Indian and Alaska Native | 70 | 0.2% |
| Asian | 1,842 | 6.5% |
| Native Hawaiian and Other Pacific Islander | 17 | 0.1% |
| Some other race | 2,767 | 9.8% |
| Two or more races | 6,621 | 23.5% |
| Hispanic or Latino (of any race) | 11,020 | 39.1% |

=== 2006–2008 American Community Survey ===
As of the census bureau's American Community Surveys of 2006–2008, there were 23,825 people, 9,085 households, and 6,243 families residing in the community. The population density was 2,247.6 inhabitants per square mile (867.8/km^{2}). There were 9,740 housing units at an average density of 719.5 per square mile (277.8/km^{2}). The racial makeup of the community was 82.6% White( 56.1% non-Hispanic white), 9.2% African American, 0.4% Native American, 1.4% Asian, less than 0.05% Pacific Islander, 4.8% from other races, and 1.6% from two or more races. Hispanics or Latinos were 31.3% of the population.

There were 9,085 households, out of which 33.4% had children under the age of 18 living with them, 48.3% were married couples living together, 16.2% had a female householder with no husband present, and 31.3% were non-families. 23.5% of all households were made up of individuals, and 6.3% had someone living alone who was 65 years of age or older. The average household size was 2.62 and the average family size was 3.16.

In the community the population was spread out, with 26.8% under the age of 18, 6.8% from 18 to 24, 26.9% from 25 to 44, 29.5% from 45 to 64, and 9.3% who were 65 years of age or older. The median age was 38 years. For every 100 females, there were 96.6 males. For every 100 females age 18 and over, there were 93.5 males.

The median income for a household in the community was $54,732, and the median income for a family was $60,165. Males had a median income of $35,360 versus $29,739 for females. The per capita income for the community was $22,162. About 4.7% of families and 6.3% of the population were below the poverty line, including 7.1% of those under age 18 and 13.7% of those age 65 or over.

== Notable residents ==
- Carole Baskin the CEO of Big Cat Rescue, a non-profit animal sanctuary
- Dan Spivey (Born in 1952) Professional wrestler, grew up in Citrus Park

== Attractions ==
- Big Cat Rescue is a non-profit sanctuary for large cats that is open to the public. It is located off Citrus Park Drive near Gunn Highway and Veterans Expressway.
- Westfield Citrus Park is a major shopping center opened in 1999.
