= Shady Hills, Florida =

- CDP
- Location in Pasco County and the state of Florida
- Coordinates: 28°24′44″N 82°31′54″W
- Country: United States
- State: Florida
- County: Pasco

Area
  - Total: 29.14 sq mi (75.48 km^{2})
  - Land: 28.64 sq mi (74.18 km^{2})
  - Water: 0.50 sq mi (1.29 km^{2})
- Elevation: 59 ft (18 m)

Population (2020)
  - Total: 11,690
  - Density: 408.1/sq mi (157.58/km^{2})
- Time zone: UTC-5 (Eastern (EST))
  - Summer (DST): UTC-4 (EDT)
- ZIP code: 34610
- Area code: 727
- FIPS code: 12-65385
- GNIS feature ID: 2583340

Shady Hills is a census-designated place (CDP) in Pasco County, Florida, United States. As of the 2020 census, Shady Hills had a population of 11,690. It is in the Tampa-St. Petersburg-Clearwater, Florida Metropolitan Statistical Area and home to a pigeon racing group.

== Geography ==
According to the United States Census Bureau, the CDP has a total area of 27.4 square miles (71 km^{2}), of which 26.2 square miles (68 km^{2}) is land and 1.2 square miles (3.1 km^{2}) (4.49%) is water.

== Demographics ==
Historical population
Census	Pop.	Note	%±
2020	11,690		—
U.S. Decennial Census

=== 2020 census ===
As of the 2020 census, Shady Hills had a population of 11,690. The median age was 49.4 years. 18.4% of residents were under the age of 18 and 23.2% of residents were 65 years of age or older. For every 100 females there were 101.3 males, and for every 100 females age 18 and over there were 100.5 males age 18 and over.

84.5% of residents lived in urban areas, while 15.5% lived in rural areas.

There were 4,504 households in Shady Hills, of which 24.6% had children under the age of 18 living in them. Of all households, 50.8% were married-couple households, 19.3% were households with a male householder and no spouse or partner present, and 20.9% were households with a female householder and no spouse or partner present. About 22.6% of all households were made up of individuals and 11.3% had someone living alone who was 65 years of age or older.

There were 4,987 housing units, of which 9.7% were vacant. The homeowner vacancy rate was 2.2% and the rental vacancy rate was 10.3%.

Racial composition as of the 2020 census
Race	Number	Percent
White	10,073	86.2%
Black or African American	95	0.8%
American Indian and Alaska Native	50	0.4%
Asian	92	0.8%
Native Hawaiian and Other Pacific Islander	8	0.1%
Some other race	273	2.3%
Two or more races	1,099	9.4%
Hispanic or Latino (of any race)	1,110	9.5%

=== 2000 census ===
As of the 2000 census, there were 7,798 people, 2,811 households, and 2,144 families residing in the CDP. The population density was 298.0 inhabitants per square mile (115.1/km^{2}). There were 3,060 housing units at an average density of 116.9 per square mile (45.1/km^{2}). The racial makeup of the CDP was 96.83% White, 0.56% African American, 0.62% Native American, 0.18% Asian, 0.01% Pacific Islander, 0.62% from other races, and 1.18% from two or more races. Hispanic or Latino of any race were 3.90% of the population.

There were 2,811 households, out of which 34.4% had children under the age of 18 living with them, 60.6% were married couples living together, 10.1% had a female householder with no husband present, and 23.7% were non-families. 17.6% of all households were made up of individuals, and 6.8% had someone living alone who was 65 years of age or older. The average household size was 2.77 and the average family size was 3.10.

In the CDP, the population was spread out, with 26.8% under the age of 18, 7.1% from 18 to 24, 27.8% from 25 to 44, 26.7% from 45 to 64, and 11.6% who were 65 years of age or older. The median age was 38 years. For every 100 females, there were 97.6 males. For every 100 females age 18 and over, there were 96.8 males.

The median income for a household in the CDP was $34,564, and the median income for a family was $40,090. Males had a median income of $26,805 versus $23,657 for females. The per capita income for the CDP was $14,686. About 10.8% of families and 13.6% of the population were below the poverty line, including 18.0% of those under age 18 and 16.3% of those age 65 or over.

== Pigeon racing ==
Shady Hills is one of the premier areas for pigeon racing and hosts the Gulfcoast Homing Club, a group that races homing pigeons and hosts an annual Gulfcoast Classic competition. The event included $250,000 in prize money in 2011. Races can challenge the birds to cover 600 miles back to their home lofts. The Highlands subdivision (off Shady Hills Road in an area just south of the Hernando County line) is the center of activity for the pigeon racing participants and is home to the 200 member club and about 100 owners of homing pigeon.
