= University, Hillsborough County, Florida =

- Census-designated place
- Location in Hillsborough County and the state of Florida
- Coordinates: 28°04′38″N 82°26′01″W
- Country: United States
- State: Florida
- County: Hillsborough

Area
  - Total: 6.56 sq mi (17.00 km^{2})
  - Land: 6.33 sq mi (16.39 km^{2})
  - Water: 0.24 sq mi (0.61 km^{2})
- Elevation: 46 ft (14 m)

Population (2020)
  - Total: 50,893
  - Density: 8,039.9/sq mi (3,104.21/km^{2})
- Time zone: UTC-5 (Eastern (EST))
  - Summer (DST): UTC-4 (EDT)
- ZIP Codes: 33612 and 33613
- Area code: 813
- FIPS code: 12-73163
- GNIS feature ID: 2402946

University is an unincorporated census-designated place in Hillsborough County, Florida, United States. The population was 41,163 at the 2010 census, up from 30,736 at the 2000 census. The University of South Florida is located just southeast of the community, within the Tampa city limits.

== Economy ==
In 1974, University Square opened, a shopping center located at the southern end of the community that was later renamed to University Mall. It was the main source of economic development within the community during the 1970s and '80s. The businesses that were concentrated in the mall have been replaced by many stand-alone shops along Fowler and Fletcher Avenues, such as Wal-Mart, Target and dozens of fast food establishments. University Mall was later rebranded under a new name called Rithm. Since then, it has functioned as a mixed-use development incorporating student accommodation, retail outlets, and spaces for technology and innovation. One of its former department stores has been redeveloped as Hub Tampa, an off-campus student housing complex. Another Rithm project, is a 1,195-bed student housing development named Hub Tampa Fowler. Construction began in 2025 and is scheduled to open in 2027. There is a county bus transportation center operated by HARTline and a county health department located in the area. In 2021, HART started making improvements to the University Area Transit Centre with the goal to enhance public transport safety for people with disabilities. This included replacing and raising the pavements along 27th Street to reduce the gaps to the bus ramps. The number of bus stops was also increased from two to six. Fletcher East has become a hub of medical and dental groups adjacent to AdventHealth Tampa, formerly known as Florida Hospital Tampa.

The University Area Community Development Corporation (UACDC) was founded in 1998 and is located within the University CDP in Florida. Its aim is to revitalise the neighbourhoods surrounding the USF campus.

In 2025, Hillsborough County provided the UACDC with approximately $850,000 in funding. The same year, the Hillsborough County Board voted to reduce this funding by 25% each year until it was completely eliminated in 2029. Also in 2025, UACDC received a $750,000 state grant for its Prodigy Cultural Arts Programme, which offers arts, dance and music programmes for young people.

In 2026, Hillsborough County approved a $70 million project to improve drainage in the University area, as part of a flooding prevention initiative following Hurricanes Helene and Milton in 2024.

== Geography ==
University is located in northern Hillsborough County. It is 9 miles (14 km) north of downtown Tampa. The community of Lake Magdalene is to the west, and Lutz is to the north. The CDP includes the area known as Nowatney.

University is bounded by Interstate 275 to the west, Tampa city limits to the south and east, including the University of South Florida, and Sinclair Hills Road to the north. Its historical boundaries stretch as far east as Morris Bridge Road; however, the boundaries were scaled back owing to annexations by Tampa and Temple Terrace during the 1980s.

According to the United States Census Bureau, the University CDP has a total area of 6.7 square miles (17.3 km^{2}), of which 6.4 square miles (16.6 km^{2}) are land and 0.2 square miles (0.6 km^{2}), or 3.62%, are water.

== Demographics ==
Historical population
Census	Pop.	Note	%±
1970	10,039		—
1980	24,514		144.2%
1990	23,760		−3.1%
2000	30,736		29.4%
2010	41,163		33.9%
2020	50,893		23.6%

=== Racial and ethnic composition ===
University CDP, Hillsborough County, Florida – Racial and ethnic composition Note: the US Census treats Hispanic/Latino as an ethnic category. This table excludes Latinos from the racial categories and assigns them to a separate category. Hispanics/Latinos may be of any race.
Race / Ethnicity (NH = Non-Hispanic)	Pop 2000	Pop 2010	Pop 2020	% 2000	% 2010	% 2020
White alone (NH)	12,488	13,814	14,221	40.63%	33.56%	27.94%
Black or African American alone (NH)	10,141	12,699	13,676	32.99%	30.85%	26.87%
Native American or Alaska Native alone (NH)	93	108	92	0.30%	0.26%	0.18%
Asian alone (NH)	1,098	1,531	3,119	3.57%	3.72%	6.13%
Native Hawaiian or Pacific Islander alone (NH)	21	26	70	0.07%	0.06%	0.14%
Other race alone (NH)	123	104	381	0.40%	0.25%	0.75%
Mixed race or Multiracial (NH)	837	898	1,908	2.72%	2.18%	3.75%
Hispanic or Latino (any race)	5,935	11,983	17,426	19.31%	29.11%	34.24%
Total	30,736	41,163	50,893	100.00%	100.00%	100.00%

As of the 2020 United States census, there were 50,893 people, 19,315 households, and 7,190 families residing in the CDP.

As of the 2010 United States census, there were 41,163 people, 17,498 households, and 7,474 families residing in the CDP.

=== 2000 census ===
As of 2000, there were 13,623 households, out of which 24.9% had children under the age of 18 living with them, 18.1% were married couples living together, 18.4% had a female householder with no husband present, and 57.8% were non-families. 41.7% of all households were made up of individuals, and 7.1% had someone living alone who was 65 years of age or older. The average household size was 2.12 and the average family size was 2.96.

In 2000, in the CDP, the population was spread out, with 22.8% under the age of 18, 22.1% from 18 to 24, 32.5% from 25 to 44, 12.1% from 45 to 64, and 10.5% who were 65 years of age or older. The median age was 27 years. For every 100 females, there were 97.4 males. For every 100 females age 18 and over, there were 94.8 males.

In 2000, the median income for a household in the community was $22,090, and the median income for a family was $24,094. Males had a median income of $22,419 versus $20,219 for females. The per capita income for the community was $13,417. About 24.8% of families and 31.3% of the population were below the poverty line, including 39.6% of those under age 18 and 14.0% of those age 65 or over.
