= Northdale, Florida =

- Census-designated place
- Location in Hillsborough County and the state of Florida
- Coordinates: 28°06′55″N 82°31′37″W
- Country: United States
- State: Florida
- County: Hillsborough

Area
  - Total: 8.57 sq mi (22.19 km^{2})
  - Land: 8.09 sq mi (20.95 km^{2})
  - Water: 0.48 sq mi (1.24 km^{2})
- Elevation: 59 ft (18 m)

Population (2020)
  - Total: 23,033
  - Density: 2,846.9/sq mi (1,099.21/km^{2})
- Time zone: UTC-5 (Eastern (EST))
  - Summer (DST): UTC-4 (EDT)
- ZIP Code: 33624
- Area code: 813
- FIPS code: 12-49260
- GNIS feature ID: 2402549

Northdale is an unincorporated census-designated place in Hillsborough County, Florida, United States. Northdale was named by the combination of the words in North Dale Mabry, the main highway through the Northdale area. As of the 2020 census, Northdale had a population of 23,033.

== Geography ==
Northdale is located in northwest Hillsborough County. It is bordered to the north by Cheval, to the northeast by Lutz, to the east by Lake Magdalene, to the south by Carrollwood, to the southwest by Citrus Park, and to the northwest by Keystone. North Dale Mabry Highway (Florida State Road 597) forms the eastern edge of the CDP, and Veterans Expressway (Florida State Road 589) forms the southwest border. Northdale is 19 miles (31 km) north-northwest of downtown Tampa.

According to the United States Census Bureau, the Northdale CDP has a total area of 8.6 square miles (22.2 km^{2}), of which 8.1 square miles (20.9 km^{2}) are land and 0.50 square miles (1.3 km^{2}), or 5.67%, are water.

== Demographics ==
Historical population
Census	Pop.	Note	%±
1990	16,318		—
2000	20,461		25.4%
2010	22,079		7.9%
2020	23,033		4.3%

=== 2020 census ===
As of the 2020 census, Northdale had a population of 23,033. The median age was 40.9 years. 20.7% of residents were under the age of 18 and 17.4% of residents were 65 years of age or older. For every 100 females there were 92.1 males, and for every 100 females age 18 and over there were 89.3 males age 18 and over.

100.0% of residents lived in urban areas, while 0.0% lived in rural areas.

There were 8,898 households in Northdale, of which 31.1% had children under the age of 18 living in them. Of all households, 51.3% were married-couple households, 14.9% were households with a male householder and no spouse or partner present, and 26.4% were households with a female householder and no spouse or partner present. About 23.2% of all households were made up of individuals and 8.8% had someone living alone who was 65 years of age or older.

There were 9,219 housing units, of which 3.5% were vacant. The homeowner vacancy rate was 1.0% and the rental vacancy rate was 5.2%.

Racial composition as of the 2020 census
Race	Number	Percent
White	13,579	59.0%
Black or African American	1,682	7.3%
American Indian and Alaska Native	55	0.2%
Asian	1,079	4.7%
Native Hawaiian and Other Pacific Islander	16	0.1%
Some other race	1,616	7.0%
Two or more races	5,006	21.7%
Hispanic or Latino (of any race)	7,636	33.2%

=== 2010 census ===
As of the 2010 census, there were 22,079 people, 8,546 households, and 5,939 families residing in the community. The population density was 2,903.3 inhabitants per square mile (1,121.0/km^{2}). There were 9,120 housing units at an average density of 993.9 per square mile (383.7/km^{2}). The racial makeup of the community was 82.6% White (63.3% non-Hispanic white), 6.9% African American, 0.2% Native American, 4.7% Asian, less than 0.1% Pacific Islander, 2.8% from other races, and 2.8% from two or more races. Hispanic or Latino of any race were 23.5% of the population.

There were 8,546 households, out of which 31.0% had children under the age of 18 living with them, 51.8% were married couples living together, 12.8% had a female householder with no husband present, and 30.5% were non-families. 23.5% of all households were made up of individuals, and 5.5% had someone living alone who was 65 years of age or older. The average household size was 2.56 and the average family size was 3.05.

In the community the population was spread out, with 26.6% under the age of 18, 5.2% from 18 to 24, 26.4% from 25 to 44, 30.6% from 45 to 64, and 11.2% who were 65 years of age or older. The median age was 39.5 years. For every 100 females, there were 92.0 males. For every 100 females age 18 and over, there were 90.1 males.

=== Education ===
For residents 25 years and over, an estimated 93.8% are High School graduates (or equivalent). 26.5% of residents possess a bachelor's degree, and 11.1% have Graduate or Professional Degrees.

=== Income ===
The median income for a household in the community was $60,855, and the median income for a family was $72,825. The per capita income for the community was $30,371. About 8.2% of families and 10.4% of the population were below the poverty line, including 12.3% of those under age 18 and 7.4% of those age 65 or over.
