= Odessa, Florida =

- CDP
- Location in Pasco County and Hillsborough county, Florida and the state of Florida
- Coordinates: 28°10′55″N 82°33′11″W
- Country: United States
- State: Florida
- County: Hillsborough and Pasco

Area
  - Total: 5.70 sq mi (14.75 km^{2})
  - Land: 5.36 sq mi (13.89 km^{2})
  - Water: 0.33 sq mi (0.86 km^{2})
- Elevation: 52 ft (16 m)

Population (2020)
  - Total: 8,080
  - Density: 1,506.3/sq mi (581.58/km^{2})
- Time zone: UTC-5 (Eastern (EST))
  - Summer (DST): UTC-4 (EDT)
- FIPS code: 12-51100
- GNIS feature ID: 2403369

Odessa is a census-designated place (CDP) in Pasco County, Florida, United States. As of the 2020 census, Odessa had a population of 8,080. Northwest of Tampa, Odessa had been an area of open spaces, ranching, and horse properties. More recently it has seen many suburban property developments as Tampa's population expands.

== History ==
The Odessa area was first settled in the middle 1800s by the W.M. Mobley Family who migrated from Savannah, Georgia. Odessa was named in the 1880s by Peter Demens, a Russian immigrant who developed the community through the Orange Belt Railway. Later, the railroad came through, running parallel with S.R. 54. Demens also founded St. Petersburg, Florida and named both communities after places he used to go to in Russia.

There was once a large sawmill in the area providing employment. This sawmill replaced some smaller ones and was burned in a fire in 1922.

Odessa was home to Tampa Bay Executive Airport until 2004.

== Geography ==
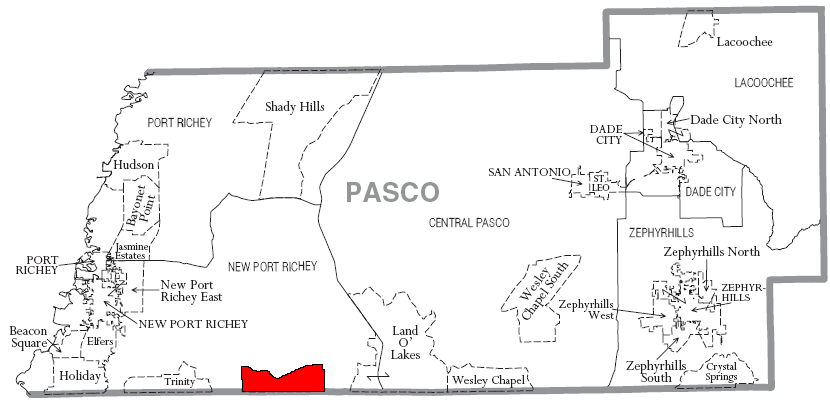
Location within county from https://www.census.gov

According to the United States Census Bureau, the Census Designated Place lies entirely in Pasco County, Florida, and has a total area of 5.6 square miles (15 km^{2}) of which 5.3 square miles (14 km^{2}) is land and 0.3 square miles (0.78 km^{2}) (6.04%) is water.

== Demographics ==
Historical population
Census	Pop.	Note	%±
2020	8,080		—
U.S. Decennial Census

=== 2020 census ===
As of the 2020 census, Odessa had a population of 8,080. The median age was 40.1 years. 23.4% of residents were under the age of 18 and 13.2% of residents were 65 years of age or older. For every 100 females there were 95.5 males, and for every 100 females age 18 and over there were 96.3 males age 18 and over.

100.0% of residents lived in urban areas, while 0.0% lived in rural areas.

There were 3,012 households in Odessa, of which 36.0% had children under the age of 18 living in them. Of all households, 56.8% were married-couple households, 14.7% were households with a male householder and no spouse or partner present, and 20.8% were households with a female householder and no spouse or partner present. About 19.1% of all households were made up of individuals and 5.5% had someone living alone who was 65 years of age or older.

There were 3,302 housing units, of which 8.8% were vacant. The homeowner vacancy rate was 1.3% and the rental vacancy rate was 18.6%.

Racial composition as of the 2020 census
Race	Number	Percent
White	5,813	71.9%
Black or African American	366	4.5%
American Indian and Alaska Native	20	0.2%
Asian	409	5.1%
Native Hawaiian and Other Pacific Islander	9	0.1%
Some other race	290	3.6%
Two or more races	1,173	14.5%
Hispanic or Latino (of any race)	1,383	17.1%

=== 2000 census ===
As of the 2000 census, there were 3,173 people, 1,181 households, and 896 families residing in the CDP. The population density was 598.9 inhabitants per square mile (231.2/km^{2}). There were 1,272 housing units at an average density of 240.1 units per square mile (92.7 units/km^{2}). The racial makeup of the CDP was 95.93% White, 0.66% African American, 0.57% Native American, 0.72% Asian, 0.03% Pacific Islander, 0.91% from other races, and 1.17% from two or more races. Hispanic or Latino of any race were 6.81% of the population.

There were 1,181 households, out of which 35.1% had children under the age of 18 living with them, 62.8% were married couples living together, 8.6% had a female householder with no husband present, and 24.1% were non-families. 18.0% of all households were made up of individuals, and 4.1% had someone living alone who was 65 years of age or older. The average household size was 2.69 and the average family size was 3.04.

In the CDP, the population was spread out, with 24.9% under the age of 18, 7.0% from 18 to 24, 32.1% from 25 to 44, 27.6% from 45 to 64, and 8.4% who were 65 years of age or older. The median age was 39 years. For every 100 females, there were 108.3 males. For every 100 females age 18 and over, there were 104.8 males.

The median income for a household in the CDP was $45,864, and the median income for a family was $55,461. Males had a median income of $38,992 versus $26,818 for females. The per capita income for the CDP was $21,548. About 3.7% of families and 6.7% of the population were below the poverty line, including 10.4% of those under age 18 and 11.5% of those age 65 or over.

== Notable people ==
- Jay Feely
- Karl Gotch
- Chris Jericho
- Carl Nicks
- Nate Pearson
- Vinny Testaverde
