= Carrollwood, Florida =

- Unincorporated community
- Location within Florida Location within the United States
- Coordinates: 28°3′8″N 82°29′9″W
- Country: United States
- State: Florida
- County: Hillsborough
- Elevation: 39 ft (12 m)
- Time zone: UTC-5 (Eastern (EST))
  - Summer (DST): UTC-4 (EDT)
- ZIP code: 33618, 33624
- Area code: 813
- Website: www.carrollwood.com

Hillsborough County Florida Incorporated and Unincorporated areas Greater Carrollwood Highlighted

Carrollwood is an unincorporated community in Hillsborough County, Florida, United States. It is part of the larger census-designated place (CDP) of Carrollwood, which also includes the neighborhood of Carrollwood Village. As of the 2020 census, Carrollwood had a population of 34,352. The ZIP code for Carrollwood is 33618.

== History ==
Carrollwood was founded in 1959 and was built out in the 1960s. The community spread westward during the 1970s and 1980s. The community was planned by Matt Jetton and originally developed by his land development company, Sun State Homes. From 1959 through 1970, more than 900 homes were built on land in the vicinity of Lake Carroll. Carrollwood Elementary school was constructed in 1963. Carrollwood was struck by a tornado outbreak, which occurred throughout Central Florida on April 4, 1966. As the neighboring development of Carrollwood Village was established in the early 1970s, the Carrollwood Country Club was built in 1972 and remains a popular landmark in the community today.

== Geography ==
Carrollwood is located at 28.1 degrees north, 82.5 degrees west (28.0523, -82.4858). The elevation for the community is 39 feet (12 m) above sea level.

Carrollwood boundaries include Lake Magdalene to the north, Tampa to the east, Egypt Lake to the south, and Carrollwood Village to the west.

== Demographics ==
=== 2020 census ===
As of the 2020 census, Carrollwood had a population of 34,352. The median age was 43.5 years. 18.4% of residents were under the age of 18 and 20.1% of residents were 65 years of age or older. For every 100 females there were 90.5 males, and for every 100 females age 18 and over there were 86.6 males age 18 and over.

100.0% of residents lived in urban areas, while 0.0% lived in rural areas.

There were 14,497 households in Carrollwood, of which 26.0% had children under the age of 18 living in them. Of all households, 45.9% were married-couple households, 16.6% were households with a male householder and no spouse or partner present, and 30.3% were households with a female householder and no spouse or partner present. About 28.7% of all households were made up of individuals and 11.4% had someone living alone who was 65 years of age or older.

There were 15,200 housing units, of which 4.6% were vacant. The homeowner vacancy rate was 1.3% and the rental vacancy rate was 6.4%.

Racial composition as of the 2020 census
Race	Number	Percent
White	20,215	58.8%
Black or African American	2,546	7.4%
American Indian and Alaska Native	97	0.3%
Asian	1,483	4.3%
Native Hawaiian and Other Pacific Islander	14	0.0%
Some other race	2,690	7.8%
Two or more races	7,307	21.3%
Hispanic or Latino (of any race)	11,916	34.7%

== Transportation ==
Some of the major roads serving the community are Dale Mabry Highway, Busch Boulevard, Bearss Avenue and Fletcher Avenue.

== Education ==
- Lake Magdalene Elementary School
- Essrig Elementary School
- Hill Middle School
- Adams Middle School
- Chamberlain High School
- Carrollwood Elementary School
- Canela Elementary School
- Gaither High School

== See also ==
- Carrollwood Village
- Carrollwood (CDP), a census defined area which consists of the communities of Carrollwood & Carrollwood Village
