= Lake Magdalene, Florida =

- Census-designated place
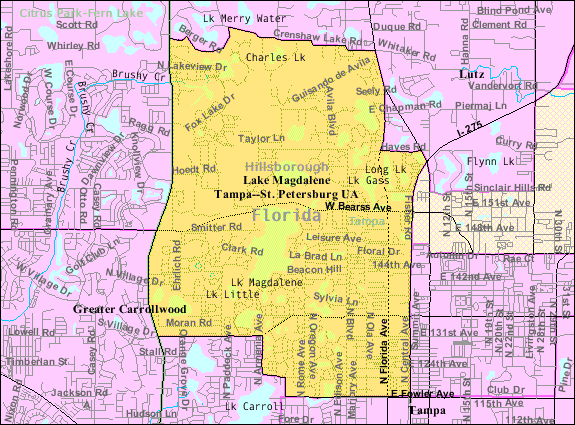

- Location in Hillsborough County and the state of Florida
- Coordinates: 28°05′12″N 82°29′22″W
- Country: United States
- State: Florida
- County: Hillsborough

Area
  - Total: 11.61 sq mi (30.07 km^{2})
  - Land: 10.20 sq mi (26.42 km^{2})
  - Water: 1.41 sq mi (3.65 km^{2})
- Elevation: 46 ft (14 m)

Population (2020)
  - Total: 30,742
  - Density: 3,013.6/sq mi (1,163.55/km^{2})
- Time zone: UTC-5 (Eastern (EST))
  - Summer (DST): UTC-4 (EDT)
- ZIP Code: 33612, 33613 & 33618
- Area code: 813
- FIPS code: 12-38350
- GNIS feature ID: 2403199

Lake Magdalene is a census-designated place (CDP) in Hillsborough County, Florida, United States. It is part of the Tampa Bay area. The population was 30,742 at the 2020 census.

== History ==
As a rural community northwest of Tampa, this area of Hillsborough County had welcomed enough residents to receive its first post office in 1888, followed by a scattering of schools and churches—most notably the United Brethren Church (now Lake Magdalene United Methodist), started in 1895 by Reverend Isaac W. Bearss, whose family line still maintains several acres of citrus groves in the region, butted up against the busy east-west, North Tampa corridor that bears the family name. The rustic qualities of Lake Magdalene remained until the 1990s when residential construction in Tampa pushed northward. By 1990 almost 16,000 people lived in Lake Magdalene, and according to the 2000 census, its population had nearly doubled to 28,755.

Lake Magdalene is surrounded by, and takes its name from, a 206-acre (0.83 km^{2}) freshwater lake. The lake's name may come from the moniker of a Native American woman, Magdalena, who interpreted the language for a Spanish expedition into Florida in 1549, or the name may have resulted from the 1882 marriage in the community of John Parrish and Mary Magdalene Yates, daughter of Jonah Yates, first mayor of Plant City.

== Geography ==
Lake Magdalene is located in northwestern Hillsborough County. It is bordered to the north by Lutz, to the east by the University neighborhood, to the south by the city of Tampa, to the southwest by Carrollwood, and to the west by Northdale. Interstate 275 forms the eastern edge of the CDP, and the Dale Mabry Highway (Florida State Road 597) forms the western edge.

According to the United States Census Bureau, the community has a total area of 11.6 square miles (30.1 km^{2}), of which 10.2 square miles (26.5 km^{2}) are land and 1.4 square miles (3.6 km^{2}), or 12.11%, are water. There are at least 11 named lakes in the CDP, the largest of which is Lake Magdalene near the center of the community.

== Demographics ==
Historical population
Census	Pop.	Note	%±
1970	9,266		—
1980	13,331		43.9%
1990	15,973		19.8%
2000	28,755		80.0%
2010	28,509		−0.9%
2020	30,742		7.8%

=== Racial and ethnic composition ===
Lake Magdalene racial composition (Hispanics excluded from racial categories) (NH = Non-Hispanic)
Race	Pop 2010	Pop 2020	% 2010	% 2020
White (NH)	19,076	16,560	66.91%	53.87%
Black or African American (NH)	1,974	2,344	6.92%	7.62%
Native American or Alaska Native (NH)	55	44	0.19%	0.14%
Asian (NH)	774	1,112	2.71%	3.62%
Pacific Islander or Native Hawaiian (NH)	16	14	0.06%	0.05%
Some other race (NH)	75	185	0.26%	0.60%
Two or more races/Multiracial (NH)	520	1,181	1.82%	3.84%
Hispanic or Latino (any race)	6,019	9,302	21.11%	30.26%
Total	28,509	30,742		

=== 2020 census ===
As of the 2020 census, Lake Magdalene had a population of 30,742. The median age was 44.5 years. 17.8% of residents were under the age of 18 and 21.6% of residents were 65 years of age or older. For every 100 females there were 93.0 males, and for every 100 females age 18 and over there were 90.6 males age 18 and over.

100.0% of residents lived in urban areas, while 0.0% lived in rural areas.

There were 12,785 households in Lake Magdalene, of which 25.4% had children under the age of 18 living in them. Of all households, 44.9% were married-couple households, 19.1% were households with a male householder and no spouse or partner present, and 28.5% were households with a female householder and no spouse or partner present. About 29.4% of all households were made up of individuals and 12.0% had someone living alone who was 65 years of age or older.

There were 13,750 housing units, of which 7.0% were vacant. The homeowner vacancy rate was 1.9% and the rental vacancy rate was 10.4%.

Racial composition as of the 2020 census
Race	Number	Percent
White	18,961	61.7%
Black or African American	2,574	8.4%
American Indian and Alaska Native	102	0.3%
Asian	1,129	3.7%
Native Hawaiian and Other Pacific Islander	20	0.1%
Some other race	2,298	7.5%
Two or more races	5,658	18.4%
Hispanic or Latino (of any race)	9,302	30.3%

=== 2010 census ===
As of the 2010 United States census, there were 28,509 people, 12,263 households, and 7,509 families residing in the CDP.

=== 2000 census ===
As of the census of 2000, there were 28,755 people, 12,085 households, and 7,722 families residing in the community. The population density was 2,718.9 inhabitants per square mile (1,049.8/km^{2}). There were 12,938 housing units at an average density of 1,223.3 per square mile (472.3/km^{2}). The racial makeup of the community was 86.65% White, 5.91% African American, 0.35% Native American, 2.33% Asian, 0.03% Pacific Islander, 2.64% from other races, and 2.09% from two or more races. Hispanic or Latino of any race were 13.51% of the population.

As of 2000, there were 12,085 households, out of which 28.9% had children under the age of 18 living with them, 49.5% were married couples living together, 10.9% had a female householder with no husband present, and 36.1% were non-families. 28.9% of all households were made up of individuals, and 8.6% had someone living alone who was 65 years of age or older. The average household size was 2.35 and the average family size was 2.93.

In 2000, in the community the population was spread out, with 22.5% under the age of 18, 7.9% from 18 to 24, 29.9% from 25 to 44, 26.8% from 45 to 64, and 13.0% who were 65 years of age or older. The median age was 39 years. For every 100 females, there were 91.7 males. For every 100 females age 18 and over, there were 89.7 males.

In 2000, the median income for a household in the community was $43,259, and the median income for a family was $54,276. Males had a median income of $39,556 versus $30,398 for females. The per capita income for the community was $26,685. About 5.6% of families and 7.2% of the population were below the poverty line, including 8.6% of those under age 18 and 8.1% of those age 65 or over.

== Government ==
Politically, Lake Magdalene is part of congressional district 14.

== Schools ==
Lake Magdalene is served by Hillsborough County Public Schools through the following:

- Lake Magdalene Elementary School
- Miles Elementary School
- Buchanan Middle School
- Chamberlain High School
- Gaither High School

Hillsborough County Public Schools has a magnet program and students in the district can attend these schools:

- Walker Middle Magnet School
- Hillsborough High School
