= Antioch, Florida =

- Unincorporated community
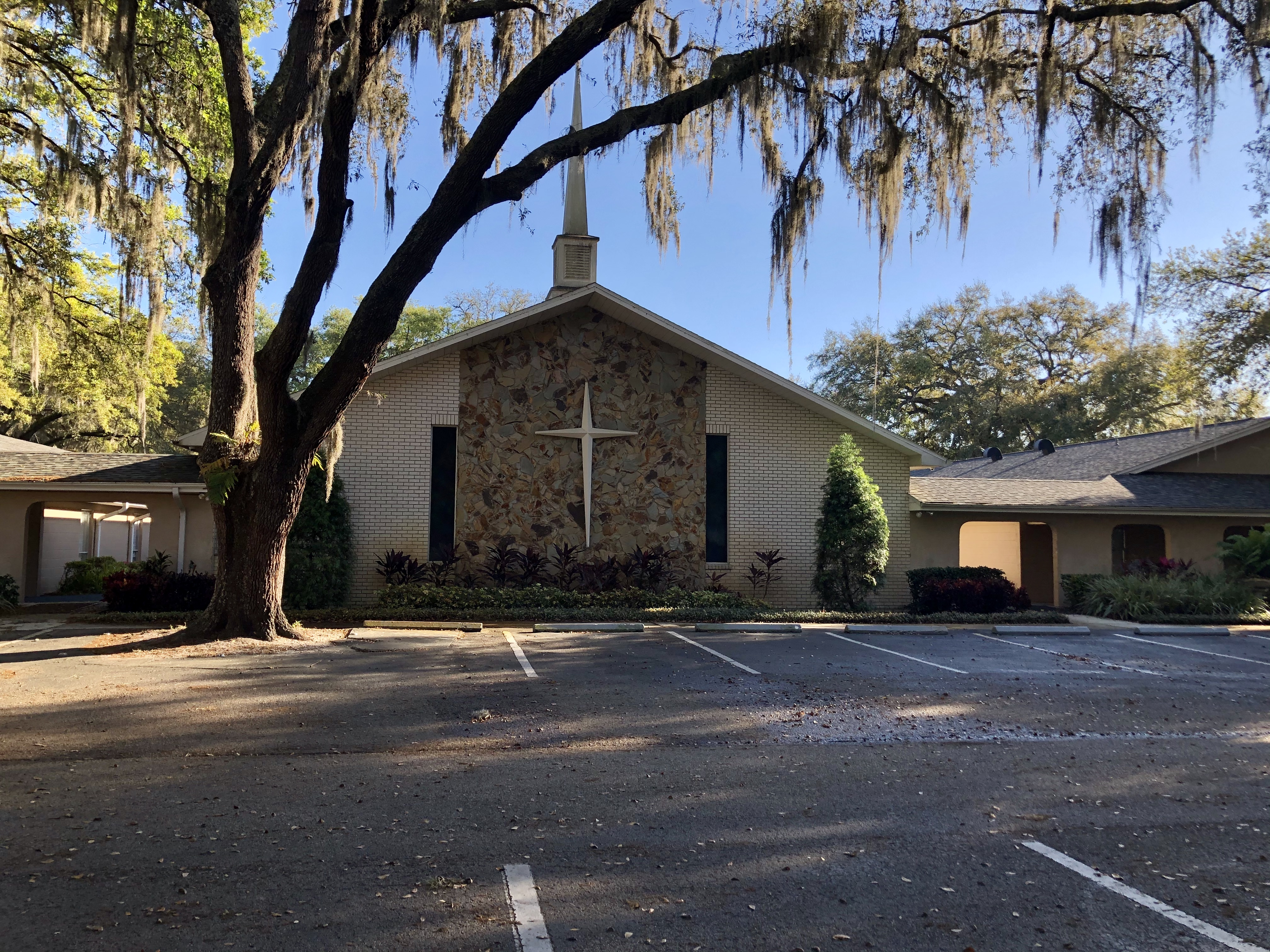
- East Thonotosassa Baptist Church in Antioch

- Location within Florida Location within the United States
- Coordinates: 28°02′49″N 82°14′56″W
- Country: United States
- State: Florida
- County: Hillsborough
- Time zone: UTC-5 (Eastern (EST))
  - Summer (DST): UTC-4 (EDT)

Antioch is an unincorporated community in eastern Hillsborough County, Florida, United States, located on the east side of Lake Thonotosassa. It is partly within the Thonotosassa census-designated place.

== History ==
As a community, Antioch dates to 1885. The community draws its name from the earliest church in the area, now known as the Antioch church of Christ. In the late 19th century the church served Baptists on the second and fourth Sundays and churches of Christ on the first and third.

== Education ==
The first school was established in 1877. The community is now served by Hillsborough County Schools. For high school, the area is zoned to Armwood High School in nearby Seffner.
