= East Lake, Florida =

East Lake, Florida, may refer to:

- East Lake, Pinellas County, Florida, an unincorporated community and census designated place in Pinellas County, Florida
- East Lake, Hillsborough County, Florida, an unincorporated community in Hillsborough County, Florida
- East Lake-Orient Park, Florida, an unincorporated census-designated place in Hillsborough County, Florida
