= East Lake, Hillsborough County, Florida =

- Unincorporated community
- Location within Florida Location within the United States
- Coordinates: 27°59′48″N 82°22′59″W
- Country: United States
- State: Florida
- County: Hillsborough
- Time zone: UTC-5 (Eastern (EST))
  - Summer (DST): UTC-4 (EDT)
- ZIP code: 33610
- GNIS feature ID: 2407579

East Lake (or East Lake Park) is an unincorporated community in Hillsborough County, Florida, United States. It is combined with Orient Park to form the census-designated place of East Lake-Orient Park. According to Rand McNally in 2002, the population estimate for the community was 3,400. The community is served by ZIP Code 33610.

== Geography ==
East Lake is located about 4 miles (6.4 km) northeast of Tampa.

== Description ==
East Lake's boundaries include Tampa city limits to the west, the unincorporated community of Del Rio to the north, U.S. Route 301 to the east, and Dr. Martin Luther King Jr. Boulevard to the south. Interstate 4 runs through the community. East Lake Park is a 325-home subdivision which was developed in the 1950s around the 100-acre (0.40 km^{2}) East Lake (a.k.a. Bellows Lake). The community is accessible to locations including the Florida State Fairgrounds.

== East Lake Square Mall ==
East Lake Square Mall was a shopping mall located within the area. It was opened in 1976 and operated until 1998, when sales and customer volume declined sharply after the opening of the Brandon Town Center in nearby Brandon. In addition to featuring several major retailers, the mall had a branch of the Tampa–Hillsborough County Public Library System, which opened in 1988; the branch moved its operations to the Seffner-Mango Branch Library, in nearby Mango, after the mall's closing. The mall was quickly converted to a commercial complex called Netpark.
