= Edward J. DeBartolo =

Edward J. DeBartolo may refer to:

- Edward J. DeBartolo Sr. (1909–1994), shopping mall developer who founded his company, Edward J. DeBartolo Corporation
- Edward J. DeBartolo Jr. (born 1946), former owner of the San Francisco 49ers, son of the shopping mall developer
