= Desmond Watson =

American football player (born 2003)

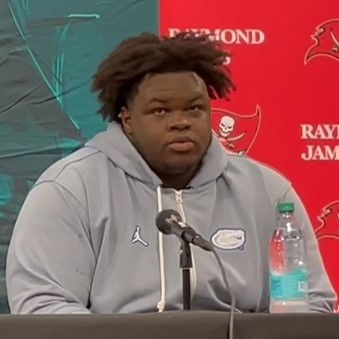
- Watson after the 2024 Gasparilla Bowl

Profile
- Position: Nose tackle

Personal information
- Born: January 5, 2003 (age 23); Plant City, Florida, U.S.
- Listed height: 6 ft 6 in (1.98 m)
- Listed weight: 464 lb (210 kg)

Career information
- High school: Armwood (Seffner, Florida)
- College: Florida (2021–2024)
- NFL draft: 2025: undrafted

Career history
- Tampa Bay Buccaneers (2025)*; DC Defenders (2026)*
- * Offseason or practice squad member only
- Stats at Pro Football Reference

Desmond Watson (born January 5, 2003), nicknamed "Big Dez", is an American professional football nose tackle. He played college football for the Florida Gators. From Armwood High School, Watson is known for his size, standing at 6 feet 6 inches (1.98 m) and weighing over 425 pounds (200 kg). One of the largest players in NCAA Division I football history, he played for Florida from 2021 to 2024. He signed with the Buccaneers as an undrafted free agent in 2025.

== Early life ==
Born in Plant City, Florida, Watson is one of six children and was the lightest at birth. He quickly increased in size and by the time he was in peewee youth football leagues he was already a "giant", according to The Naples Daily News. He attended Armwood High School in Seffner, playing football and participating in shot put. By his junior year, he weighed 375 pounds (170 kg), a number heavier than every defensive tackle in the National Football League (NFL) at the time.

Watson played 13 games as a junior in 2019, totaling 65 tackles, 34 of which were for a loss, as well as 10.0 sacks, helping Armwood compile a record of 12–2 and make a deep run in the state playoffs. He was named a second-team all-state selection for his performance. As a senior, he played eight games, posting 39 tackles and 6.0 sacks. Watson finished his time at Armwood with 158 total tackles, including 113 solo stops, 24.0 sacks and nine quarterback hurries. A four-star recruit, he received offers to play college football from several major schools, including Alabama, Florida State, Kentucky, Michigan and Tennessee, eventually choosing to commit to play for the Florida Gators.

== College career ==
When Watson enrolled at Florida in 2021, he weighed 440 pounds (200 kg). He was able to lower his weight to 400 pounds (180 kg) to begin his freshman season. He appeared in all 13 games on the year, seeing action on special teams and as a reserve defensive tackle, thus becoming one of the largest players in NCAA Division I football history. He played a total of 150 snaps and saw defensive action in eight games, recording seven tackles and half a sack. Between his freshman and sophomore seasons, his weight increased to 415 pounds (188 kg).

Watson became a starter as a sophomore in 2022, appearing in 13 games, 10 as a starter, and recording 25 tackles and 1.5 TFLs. He stripped the ball away against South Carolina while stiff-arming quarterback Spencer Rattler, which became a viral video. Watson entered spring camp in 2023 weighing 449 pounds (204 kg), but later dropped his weight. He appeared in all 12 games during the 2023 season and posted 11 tackles and one tackle for loss. He entered spring camp in 2024 with a weight of 464 pounds (210 kg), later dropping back down to 449 pounds (204 kg) for the 2024 season. As a senior in 2024, he played in all 13 games and totaled 20 tackles, a pass breakup and a quarterback hurry. In his last career game, the 2024 Gasparilla Bowl, he recorded one carry and gained one yard for a first down. Additionally, Watson held up Tulane quarterback Ty Thompson in the air, as Thompson attempted to rush on a 3rd and 2 until referees ended the play. He concluded his collegiate career having appeared in every game and made 63 tackles and 1.5 sacks.

== Professional career ==
Pre-draft measurables
Height	Weight	Arm length	Hand span	40-yard dash	10-yard split	20-yard split	20-yard shuttle	Three-cone drill	Vertical jump	Broad jump	Bench press
6 ft 6 in (1.98 m)	464 lb (210 kg)	33 1/2 in (0.85 m)	10 1/2 in (0.27 m)	5.95 s	2.05 s	3.31 s	5.28 s	9.00 s	25.0 in (0.64 m)	6 ft 10 in (2.08 m)	36 reps
All values from Pro Day

=== Tampa Bay Buccaneers ===
Although not invited to the NFL Scouting Combine, Watson impressed at his pro day. Measuring at 6 feet 6 inches (1.98 m) and 464 pounds (210 kg), he completed 36 bench press reps, which would have been the top mark at the combine, and ran the 40-yard dash in 5.95 seconds, in addition to recording a vertical jump of 25 inches (64 cm).

Watson, who went undrafted during the 2025 NFL draft, signed as an undrafted free agent with the Tampa Bay Buccaneers.

On July 24, 2025, Watson was placed on the non-football injury list. Watson weighed in at 449 pounds and head coach Todd Bowles said he wanted Watson to be a "healthier player on the field". He was waived on August 25, a day before the deadline for final roster cuts. After clearing waivers, Watson was initially not signed to the Buccaneers practice squad before the start of the 2025 regular season. On September 23, after a tryout, he was re-signed to the team's practice squad. Watson was released on November 11.

=== DC Defenders ===
On January 14, 2026, Watson was selected by the DC Defenders of the United Football League (UFL). He was released on January 21.

== Personal life ==
Watson wore number 21 to honor his younger brother, who became disabled after suffering a stroke.
