= Mango-Seffner, Florida =

Mango-Seffner
- Former CDP
- Location within the state of Florida
- Coordinates: 27°58′47″N 82°17′51″W
- Country: United States
- State: Florida
- County: Hillsborough

Area
  - Land: 4.5 sq mi (11.7 km^{2})

Population (1980)
  - Total: 6,493
  - Density: 1,440/sq mi (555/km^{2})
- Time zone: UTC-5 (Eastern (EST))
  - Summer (DST): UTC-4 (EDT)
- ZIP codes: 33550 (Mango) 33584 (Seffner)
- Area code: 813
- FIPS code: 42935

Mango-Seffner was a census-designated place in Hillsborough County, Florida during the 1980 United States Census, which consisted of the communities of Mango and Seffner. The population in 1980 was 6,493. The census area split to form Mango and Seffner CDPs in 1990, when the populations recorded were 8,700 and 5,371 respectively.

== Geography ==
The census area of Mango-Seffner was located at approximately 27.97971 north, 82.297382 west. The census area was located east of East Lake-Orient Park and north of Brandon. The CDP had a land area of 4.5 square miles (11.7 square kilometers).
