= NetPark Tampa Bay =

Business park in Tampa, Florida; former shopping mall

General information
- Status: Operational
- Type: Business park
- Location: 5701 East Hillsborough Avenue, Tampa, Florida, United States
- Coordinates: 27°59′35″N 82°23′24″W
- Opened: June 1999; 27 years ago
- Operator: Saxum real estate; CBRE Group

Technical details
- Floor count: 2
- Floor area: 1,006,932 sq ft (93,547.0 m^{2})

Website
- http://www.netparktampabay.net/

NetPark Tampa Bay is a business park in the East Lake-Orient Park neighborhood of Tampa, Florida, United States. The complex, which primarily houses offices, is a redevelopment of the former East Lake Square Mall, a shopping mall built by Edward J. DeBartolo Corporation in 1976. The mall would open on August 4, 1976 opening one day prior to the near by Tampa Bay Center. The mall opened with anchor stores JCPenney, Montgomery Ward, and Belk-Lindsey, with H. J. Wilson Co. joining in 1980. H. J. Wilson Co. became Service Merchandise in 1985, and Belk-Lindsey sold their location at the mall to Dillard's in 1992. After a period of decline in the 1990s which included the closure of all four anchor stores, the mall was closed entirely in 1998 and officially reopened as NetPark Tampa Bay a year later.

== History ==
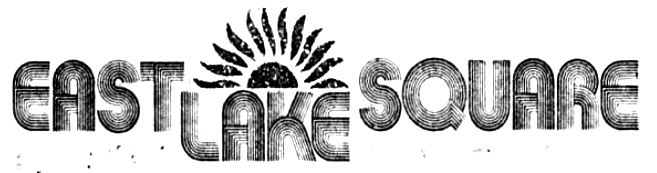
Eastlake Square Mall logo from a newspaper clipping (1979)

Edward J. DeBartolo Corporation, a former shopping mall developer based out of Youngstown, Ohio, first proposed for a 1,050,000 sq ft (98,000 m^{2}) shopping mall in Tampa, Florida in 1974. It was to be situated on Hillsborough Avenue, between North 58th Street and Harney Road. This was the second mall built by DeBartolo in the area, following University Square Mall (now University Mall).

East Lake Square Mall
- Location: Tampa, Florida, United States
- Address: East Lake-Orient Park, Tampa, Florida
- Opened: 1975
- Closed: 1998
- Developer: Edward J. DeBartolo Corporation
- Num. of anchor tenants: 4
- Floors: 2

Prior to the opening of East Lake Square, its development led to concerns from owners of other local shopping mall properties regarding market saturation. Managers of Northgate and Floriland malls, two shopping centers southwest of University Square, reported that many stores in both malls had either closed or relocated. Grant Donaldson of The Tampa Times stated in March 1975 that many merchants of Northgate and Floriland were "dumbfounded" by the construction of East Lake Square Mall.

DeBartolo had begun construction on the mall by the end of 1975, at which point JCPenney, Montgomery Ward, and Belk-Lindsey were confirmed as the three anchor stores. The 155,000 sq ft (14,400 m^{2}) Montgomery Ward was the chain's third location in Tampa.

By July 1976, the mall was near completion with a targeted opening date of August 4, except for the Belk-Lindsey which would not be completed until early 1977. Both JCPenney and the mall opened as planned on August 4, 1976. Belk-Lindsey replaced an older location along Henderson Avenue in Tampa. The first expansion to the mall came in late 1979, when H. J. Wilson Co., a catalog merchant and jeweler based in Baton Rouge, Louisiana, announced plans to become the mall's fourth anchor store. The 66,000 sq ft (6,100 m^{2}) store would be the chain's 48th location. Five years later, Wilson's was sold to Service Merchandise. In 1990, the mall had a gross leasable area of 1,006,932 sq ft (93,547.0 m^{2}) and over 115 stores on two levels. Two years later, Dillard's began negotiations with Belk-Lindsey to buy three stores as a means of expansion in the Tampa market: East Lake Square, along with DeSoto Square Mall and Gulf View Square. All three of these were sold in August of that year.

== Decline and conversion to offices ==
Despite the addition of Service Merchandise and Dillard's, the mall struggled with tenancy for most of its life. Aissatou Sidime of The Tampa Tribune attributed the mall's decline to a number of factors. One factor was a lack of commercial and residential growth around the mall; by the 1990s, most of the mall was instead surrounded by industrial sites. In addition, the mall was the scene of several crimes, including car vandalism, shoplifting, and armed robbery.

John Hancock Financial bought the mall from the DeBartolo corporation in January 1995. At the time, the mall faced increasing competition from Brandon Town Center (now Westfield Brandon), which would open only one month later. In response to this, Dillard's converted its East Lake Square store to an outlet store, while JCPenney announced plans to rearrange the store's departments in order to put a greater focus on home furniture. JCPenney closed the East Lake Square location in August 1997. At the time, the manager of the Dillard's outlet said that he had no plans to close the store at the time. Despite this, representatives of John Hancock and Divaris Real Estate, whom they had hired for management and leasing, had begun proposing redevelopment of the property. A December 1997 article in the Tampa Tribune described East Lake Square as a dead mall, "rented mostly by locally owned discount fashion stores or variety stores where everything's priced under $1."

By 1998, Dillard's, Service Merchandise, and Montgomery Ward had all closed as well, leaving the mall without an anchor store. As a result, John Hancock Financial announced a plan for renovation into a business park composed of offices. The last tenant to leave was a dentist's office. Conversion of the property began in 1998, with assistance from two real estate developers: Divaris Real Estate and Tampa-based Nat Cherry (of Paragon Group). HOK was also hired as architect for the conversion. As part of the renovation, the former mall structure was fully renovated, to the point that some portions were dismantled to dirt floors. Research conducted by Cherry concluded that Tampa had the highest number of call center employees in the country, and thus decided to include those as part of the conversion.

The center officially reopened as NetPark Tampa Bay in June 1999, with the first tenant being a 115,000 sq ft (10,700 m^{2}) call center for General Motors. John Hancock also converted 50,000 sq ft (4,600 m^{2}) of former mall space into a call center, and the former location of the mall's food court into a restaurant. Other tenants installed by John Hancock included security, child care, and a fitness center for employees of the complex. John Hancock sold a fifty percent share of NetPark Tampa Bay to Triple Net Properties in 2003; two years later, a group of tenants within the complex bought out Triple Net. Management duties changed several times until 2014, when the property became managed by Bluett Capital Realty. By 2017, NetPark Tampa Bay was at 100 percent occupancy.

Tenants of the center include Maximus Inc., Humana, and T-Mobile.
