= Mike Pearson (gridiron football) =

American gridiron football player (born 1980)

No. 72, 69
- Position: Offensive tackle

Personal information
- Born: August 22, 1980 (age 46); Tampa, Florida, U.S.
- Listed height: 6 ft 7 in (2.01 m)
- Listed weight: 297 lb (135 kg)

Career information
- High school: Armwood (Seffner, Florida)
- College: Florida
- NFL draft: 2002: 2nd round, 40th overall pick

Career history
- Jacksonville Jaguars (2002–2005); Miami Dolphins (2006)*; Houston Texans (2006); Toronto Argonauts (2007)
- * Offseason or practice squad member only

Awards and highlights
- Consensus All-American (2001); 2× First-team All-SEC (2000, 2001); University of Florida Athletic Hall of Fame

Career NFL statistics
- Games played: 40
- Games started: 33
- Stats at Pro Football Reference

Career CFL statistics
- Games played: 9
- Games started: 9

Michael Wayne Pearson (born August 22, 1980) is an American former professional football player who was an offensive tackle for five seasons in the National Football League (NFL) and the Canadian Football League (CFL). Pearson played college football for the Florida Gators, earning consensus All-American honors. A second-round pick in the 2002 NFL draft, he played professionally for the Jacksonville Jaguars of the NFL and the Toronto Argonauts of the CFL.

== Early life ==
Pearson was born in Tampa, Florida in 1980. He attended Armwood High School in Seffner, Florida, where he played high school football for the Armwood Hawks.

== College career ==
Pearson accepted an athletic scholarship to attend the University of Florida in Gainesville, Florida, where he played for coach Steve Spurrier's Florida Gators football team from 1999 to 2001. After being red-shirted in 1998, he was a three-year letterman for the Gators, and he received the Gators' James W. Kynes Award, recognizing him as the lineman who "best exemplified mental and physical toughness and iron-man determination." He was also a two-time Southeastern Conference (SEC) Academic Honor Roll selection. Pearson played in thirty-five games with thirty-three starts, including two bowl games: the 2001 Orange Bowl and the 2000 Sugar Bowl. He was a first-team All-SEC selection in 2000 and 2001, and was recognized as a consensus first-team All-American in 2001.

Pearson graduated from the University of Florida with a bachelor's degree in business administration in 2001, and was inducted into the University of Florida Athletic Hall of Fame as a "Gator Great" in 2013.

== Professional career ==
=== Jacksonville Jaguars ===
Pearson was selected in the second round (40th pick overall) in the 2002 NFL Draft by the Jacksonville Jaguars, and he played for the Jaguars from 2002 through 2005. His "break" came in his rookie season, when offensive tackle Maurice Williams was injured. Pearson started at left tackle for thirty-one consecutive games, until he was injured on October 3, 2004, against the Indianapolis Colts; after knee surgery he was placed on injured reserve, and returned in 2005. He started two games in 2005, and was released.

=== Miami Dolphins ===
In 2006, Pearson was signed by the Miami Dolphins, but released during training camp.

=== Houston Texans ===
Pearson signed by the Houston Texans in November and was released in December.

=== Toronto Argonauts ===
In June 2007, he signed as a free agent with the CFL's Toronto Argonauts. He began the season as the Argos' starting left tackle, but after two games, was moved to the injured reserved list with an infected right index finger. Pearson was treated to intravenous therapy with serious concerns over whether the infection required finger amputation. He ultimately regained full health without any amputation and returned to his starting duties at left tackle on September 3, 2007, against the Winnipeg Blue Bombers. On November 3, 2007, Pearson suffered a season-ending injury when teammate Chad Folk fell on his ankle. On May 31, 2008, Pearson announced his retirement from professional football, after having played in nine regular season games for the Argonauts during 2007.

== See also ==
- 2001 College Football All-America Team
- Florida Gators football, 1990–99
- History of the Jacksonville Jaguars
- List of Florida Gators football All-Americans
- List of Florida Gators in the NFL draft
- List of University of Florida alumni
- List of University of Florida Athletic Hall of Fame members
