= Jarriett Buie =

American football player (born 1985)

No. 16
- Position: Defensive end

Personal information
- Born: September 7, 1985 (age 41); Tampa, Florida, U.S.
- Listed height: 6 ft 3 in (1.91 m)
- Listed weight: 260 lb (118 kg)

Career information
- High school: Armwood (Seffner, Florida)
- College: South Florida
- NFL draft: 2009: undrafted

Career history
- Tampa Bay Buccaneers (2009)*; Florida Tuskers (2010); Tampa Bay Storm (2011)*
- * Offseason or practice squad member only

Jarriett Buie (born September 7, 1985) is an American former football defensive end. He was signed by the Tampa Bay Buccaneers as an undrafted free agent in 2009. He was also a member of the Florida Tuskers of the United Football League, Montreal Alouettes Canadian Football League, and the Tampa Bay Storm, Arena Football League which he holds the Storm single game sack record. He played college football at South Florida. He is currently serving In the United States Army since April 2, 2012.

== Early life ==
Attended Armwood High School in Seffner, Florida. Ranked 22nd-best defensive end by Rivals.com Ranked as 25th-best player in the state by Tampa Tribune and 39th by Orlando Sentinel Ranked No. 2 overall player in Tampa Bay area by St. Petersburg Times and also a member of that papers all-Suncoast team First-team Class 4A all-state for (15-0) state champion Armwood High Hilllsborough County Defensive Player of the Year by Tampa Tribune 44 tackles prior to state playoffs, including nine sacks and 14 tackles for loss Also had two caused fumbles.

== College career ==
In 2004, he sat out season while concentrating on his academics.

Buie missed the 2005 season with a broken foot in preseason camp ended his season. He did dress for the final few games, but did not see action.

In 2006, he started four games among his 12 appearances and had 17 tackles, with one sack.

In 2007, he was a starter at defensive end— he started nine games and made 26 tackles, including six tackles for loss, one sack, two fumble recoveries and 13 quarterback hurries.

In 2008, he started and played in all 13 games and finished year with five sacks, 31 tackles, three quarterback hurries and two pass breakups.

== Professional career ==
=== Pre-draft ===
Pre-draft measurables
! Weight	40-yard dash	20-yard split	20-yard shuttle	Three-cone drill	Vertical jump	Broad jump	Bench press
251 lb (114 kg)	4.81 s	2.78 s	4.35 s	6.94 s	29 1/2 in (0.75 m)	9 ft 2 in (2.79 m)	32 reps
All values from Pro Day.

=== Tampa Bay Buccaneers ===
After going undrafted in the 2009 NFL draft, Buie signed with the Tampa Bay Buccaneers as an undrafted free agent. He was waived on August 29, only to be re-signed on September 1.
