= Florida State Road 574 =

State highway in Florida, United States

State Road 574

Route information
- Maintained by FDOT
- Length: 23.044 mi (37.086 km)

Major junctions
- West end: US 92 in Tampa
- I-275 in Tampa; US 41 in Tampa; I-4 near Tampa; US 301 near Tampa; I-75 near Mango
- East end: US 92 in Plant City

Location
- Country: United States
- State: Florida
- Counties: Hillsborough

Highway system
- Florida State Highway System; Interstate; US; State; Former; Pre‑1945; Toll; Scenic
← SR 573	→ SR 575

State Road 574 (SR 574) is an east–west state highway in Central Hillsborough County, Florida. It runs from northwestern Tampa to Plant City, and parallels County Road 574 west of Mango.

== Route description ==
Beginning at the intersection of U.S. Route 92 (US 92 or the Dale Mabry Highway) on the north side of Raymond James Stadium and the site of the former Tampa Stadium as Martin Luther King Jr. Boulevard (formerly Buffalo Avenue), SR 574 is a six-lane divided highway until it passes the home office of the Tampa Bay Buccaneers, and narrows down to a four-lane divided highway. Instantly, the road is surrounded by the Tampa Branch of St. Joseph's Hospital. The road remains a four-lane divided highway until it reaches Armenia Avenue and becomes a four-lane undivided highway with occasional left-turn lanes. The road crosses the Hillsborough River over a high bridge built in 1960.

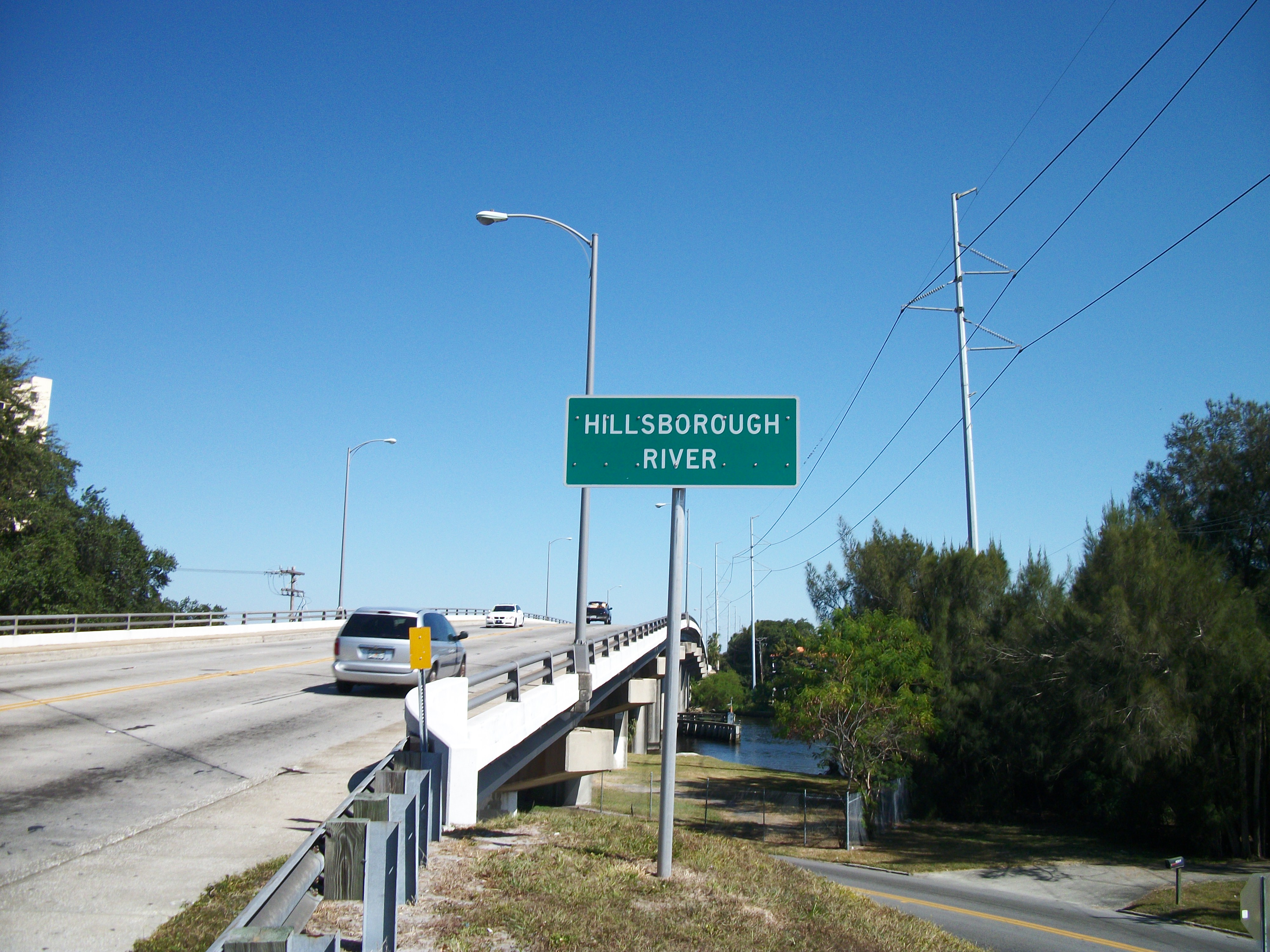
Eastbound SR 574 as it crosses the Hillsborough River over the Paul H. Smith Bridge.

The intersection of southbound US 41 Business (US 41 Bus.) moves from Highland Avenue to Tampa Avenue when it crosses SR 574, and the road gets a divider again. Northbound US BUS 41 stays consistently on Florida Avenue. The next two major crossings are a diamond interchange with Interstate 275 (I-275) and then State Road 45 (Nebraska Avenue). East of here, the road consists of residences, local businesses and churches, and most notably the headquarters of radio station WMNF 88.5 FM. The intersection of State Road 585 (22nd Street) includes the Cyrus Green Playground on the southwest corner and College Hill Memorial Park on the southeast corner. A railroad crossing exists between Short 30th Street and 30th Street, and another one two blocks west of US 41 (40th Street). East of US 41, the road narrows down to two lanes, and two blocks later at 42nd Street, the road runs between the Garden of Memories Cemetery and Myrtle Hill Cemetery. The southern boundaries of both cemeteries include East Lake Avenue, since SR 574 crosses that street before the intersection with SR 583 (50th Street).

When SR 574 enters Grant Park, it widens back to four lanes in the vicinity of the diamond interchange with Interstate 4, and then widens to six-lanes. East of here, the Florida State Fairgrounds and a gas station can be found on the northwest corner of US 301 in Mango. After this, the road crosses over the Tampa Bypass Canal before reaching a third interchange and narrowing down to four lanes, this time with Interstate 75 as a diverging diamond interchange. After this, the road widens back to six lanes and encounters its Hillsborough County doppelganger at Broadway Avenue (CR 574) then Lemon Street and Mango Road, one of three disconnected roads in Hillsborough County that have been designated County Road 579. From there, the road narrows back down to two lanes. Before the road intersects Kingsway Road in Seffner, it moves slightly to the northeast, where it runs parallel to Amtrak's Silver Star line, as it also does in Dover. Throughout this section, there are scattered private railroad crossings that intersect with SR 574.

In Plant City, SR 574 becomes Sammonds Road, then SR 574 moves onto West Reynolds Street at a sharp reverse curve However neither of these names appear on street-name signs until the route moves off of Sammonds Road. When SR 574 returns eastward it runs along the south side of the ground of the Florida Strawberry Festival. After crossing State Road 39 (North Alexander Street), SR 574 intersects with SR 566, which is part of an eastbound only segment of U.S. Route 92. Route 574 joins eastbound US 92 as a shared hidden route with SR 600, all of which enter part of the Downtown Plant City Historic Residential District at Carey Street, and leaves it at Franklin Street. Northbound State Road 39A begins at North Wheeler Street, while entering the Downtown Plant City Commercial District, as Southbound SR 39A joins eastbound US 92/SR 574 just before intersected at North Collins Street and turns south while eastbound US 92/SR 574 becomes East Reynolds Street. SR 574 finally terminates at the intersection of East Reynolds Street, East Baker Street, and North Gordon Street, where the eastbound and westbound(E. Baker St) segments of U.S. Route 92 reunite. County Road 574 and it various suffixed alternates continue into Polk County.

== Major intersections ==
The entire route is in Hillsborough County.

Location	mi	km	Destinations	Notes
Tampa	0.000	0.000	US 92 (North Dale Mabry Highway / SR 600)	
Tampa	1.837	2.956	Paul H. Smith Bridge over Hillsborough River	
Tampa	2.653	4.270	US 41 Bus. south (North Highland Avenue / SR 685)	
Tampa	2.815	4.530	US 41 Bus. north (Florida Avenue / SR 685)	
Tampa	3.16	5.09	I-275 (SR 93) to I-4 – Ocala, St. Petersburg	I-275 exit 46B
Tampa	3.317	5.338	SR 45 (North Nebraska Avenue)	
Tampa	4.310	6.936	SR 585 (North 22nd Street) – Ybor City Historic District	
Tampa	5.578	8.977	US 41 (North 40th Street / SR 599) to I-4	
Tampa	6.340	10.203	SR 583 (North 50th Street)	
	7.41	11.93	I-4 (SR 400)	I-4 exit 5
	8.880	14.291	US 301 (SR 43) to I-4 – Riverview, Zephyrhills	
	10.935	17.598	I-75 (SR 93A) – Naples, Ocala	I-75 exit 260; diverging diamond interchange
Mango	12.148	19.550	Hewitt Street (CR 574 west)	
Mango	12.394	19.946	CR 579 north	
	16.015	25.774	To I-4 / McIntosh Road	
	19.639	31.606	To I-4 / South Forbes Road	
Plant City	20.686	33.291	Turkey Creek Road (CR 574B) - Airport	
Plant City	21.643	34.831	Sammonds Road (CR 574A east)	
Plant City	22.887	36.833	To I-4 east / SR 39 south (truck route) / Alexander Street	
Plant City	23.044	37.086	US 92 east (Thonotosassa Road / SR 600)	
1.000 mi = 1.609 km; 1.000 km = 0.621 mi
