= Thonotosassa, Florida =

- Census-designated place
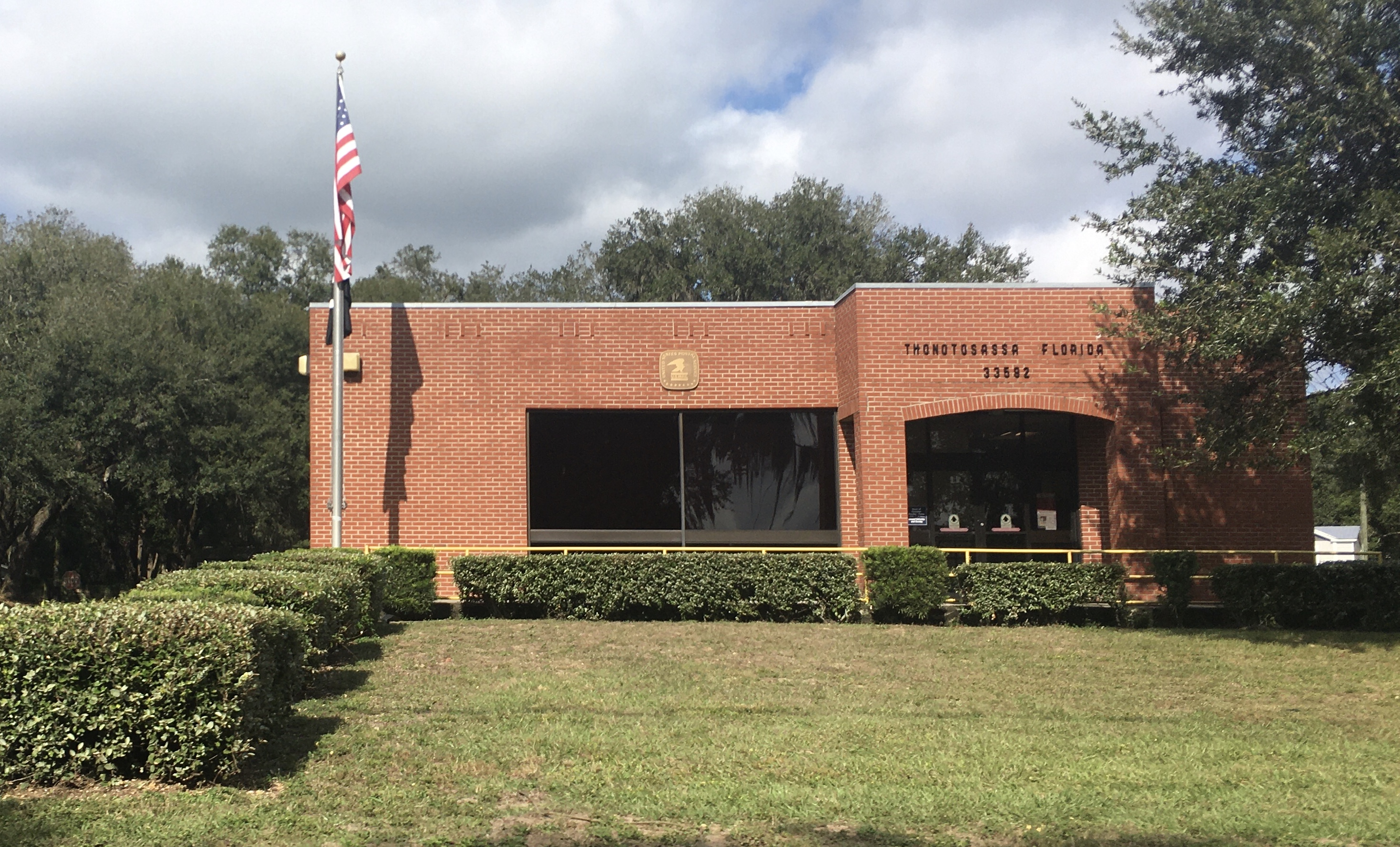
- Thonotosassa Post office

- Location in Hillsborough County and the state of Florida
- Coordinates: 28°02′37″N 82°15′54″W
- Country: United States
- State: Florida
- County: Hillsborough

Area
  - Total: 28.33 sq mi (73.37 km^{2})
  - Land: 26.48 sq mi (68.59 km^{2})
  - Water: 1.85 sq mi (4.78 km^{2})
- Elevation: 82 ft (25 m)

Population (2020)
  - Total: 15,238
- Time zone: UTC-5 (Eastern (EST))
  - Summer (DST): UTC-4 (EDT)
- ZIP code: 33592
- Area code: 813
- FIPS code: 12-71725
- GNIS feature ID: 2402927

Thonotosassa is a census-designated place (CDP) in Hillsborough County, Florida, United States. The population was 15,238 at the 2020 census, up from 13,014 at the 2010 census.

== History ==
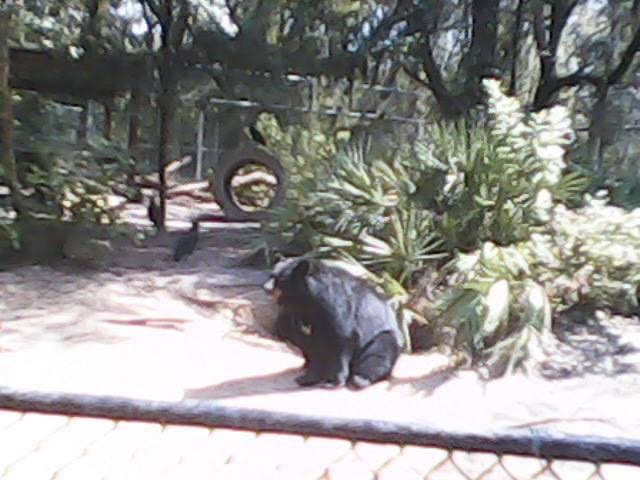
A black bear at Nature's Classroom; October 2013

The name "Thonotosassa" comes from the Seminole-Creek words ronoto "flint" and sasv "some", meaning the place was a source of valuable flint. Following the establishment of Fort Brooke in 1824 in what is now Tampa, a military road that ran northwest of Lake Thonotosassa was built between Fort Brooke and Fort King in Ocala. This road became known as the Fort King Road, which today is crossed in several locations by U.S. Route 301. Nevertheless, the presence of a Native American (probably Seminole, Creek or Mikasuki) village largely discouraged settlers from moving into the area. Following the hostilities of the Second Seminole War and with the adoption the Armed Occupation Act of 1842 American settlers began moving into the region.

In 1893, the Tampa and Thonotosassa Railroad opened a 13-mile (21 km) route between the two growing communities. This line today no longer extends into Thonotosassa, its northern tracks having been removed along with the town depot by the 1980s, but its southern portion remains a busy industrial spur, joining with the CSX main line at Neve Wye.

Among other areas for recreation for the youth is the Morris Bridge Road area and its Nature's Classroom.

== Geography ==
Thonotosassa is located in northeastern Hillsborough County. It is bordered to the southwest by East Lake-Orient Park, and to the south by Mango and Seffner. The unincorporated community of Antioch is on the eastern edge of the CDP.

The Hillsborough River forms the northern edge of the CDP, Interstate 4 forms the southern edge, and Interstate 75 forms the western edge. I-4 leads east 24 miles (39 km) to Lakeland and west 11 miles (18 km) to downtown Tampa, while I-75 leads north 90 miles (140 km) to Ocala and south 46 miles (74 km) to Bradenton. U.S. Route 301 travels through the northern part of Thonotosassa, leading northeast 15 miles (24 km) to Zephyrhills and south 16 miles (26 km) to Riverview.

According to the United States Census Bureau, the CDP has a total area of 28.3 square miles (73.4 km^{2}), of which 26.5 square miles (68.6 km^{2}) are land and 1.9 square miles (4.8 km^{2}), or 6.51%, are water. It is 40 feet (12 m) above sea level. Plant City is 13 miles (21 km) to the east.

== Demographics ==
Historical population
Census	Pop.	Note	%±
2000	6,091		—
2010	13,014		113.7%
2020	15,238		17.1%

=== 2020 census ===
As of the 2020 census, Thonotosassa had a population of 15,238. The median age was 41.8 years. 22.4% of residents were under the age of 18 and 17.1% of residents were 65 years of age or older. For every 100 females there were 100.1 males, and for every 100 females age 18 and over there were 97.9 males age 18 and over.

77.0% of residents lived in urban areas, while 23.0% lived in rural areas.

There were 5,575 households in Thonotosassa, of which 29.7% had children under the age of 18 living in them. Of all households, 45.7% were married-couple households, 20.5% were households with a male householder and no spouse or partner present, and 24.5% were households with a female householder and no spouse or partner present. About 23.7% of all households were made up of individuals and 10.2% had someone living alone who was 65 years of age or older.

There were 6,089 housing units, of which 8.4% were vacant. The homeowner vacancy rate was 1.6% and the rental vacancy rate was 8.4%.

Racial composition as of the 2020 census
Race	Number	Percent
White	9,484	62.2%
Black or African American	2,508	16.5%
American Indian and Alaska Native	128	0.8%
Asian	562	3.7%
Native Hawaiian and Other Pacific Islander	6	0.0%
Some other race	940	6.2%
Two or more races	1,610	10.6%
Hispanic or Latino (of any race)	2,648	17.4%

=== 2000 census ===
As of the 2000 census, there were 6,091 people, 2,178 households, and 1,616 families residing in the community. The population density was 365.5 inhabitants per square mile (141.1/km^{2}). There were 2,532 housing units at an average density of 151.9 per square mile (58.6/km^{2}). The racial makeup of the community was 90.63% White, 4.94% African American, 0.51% Native American, 0.38% Asian, 0.03% Pacific Islander, 1.79% from other races, and 1.72% from two or more races. Hispanic or Latino of any race were 6.29% of the population.

There were 2,178 households, out of which 34.9% had children under the age of 18 living with them, 55.6% were married couples living together, 12.2% had a female householder with no husband present, and 25.8% were non-families. 20.1% of all households were made up of individuals, and 8.1% had someone living alone who was 65 years of age or older. The average household size was 2.72 and the average family size was 3.07.

In the community the population was spread out, with 26.7% under the age of 18, 7.6% from 18 to 24, 28.6% from 25 to 44, 23.1% from 45 to 64, and 14.0% who were 65 years of age or older. The median age was 37 years. For every 100 females, there were 99.6 males. For every 100 females age 18 and over, there were 95.4 males.

The median income for a household in the community was $43,159, and the median income for a family was $44,829. Males had a median income of $31,914 versus $22,674 for females. The per capita income for the community was $18,191. About 12.7% of families and 16.0% of the population were below the poverty line, including 23.2% of those under age 18 and 17.4% of those age 65 or over.

== Education ==
=== Public schools ===
==== Elementary schools ====
- Folsom Elementary School
- Thonotosassa Elementary School

=== Charter schools ===
- Dr. Kiran C. Patel High School

=== Libraries ===
- Thonotosassa Branch Library
