= Orient Park, Florida =

Unincorporated community in Florida, US

- Unincorporated community
- Location within Florida Location within the United States
- Coordinates: 27°58′20″N 82°22′23″W
- Country: United States
- State: Florida
- County: Hillsborough
- Time zone: UTC-5 (Eastern (EST))
  - Summer (DST): UTC-4 (EDT)

Orient Park is an unincorporated community in Hillsborough County, Florida, United States. Along with East Lake, it is a part of the census-designated place of East Lake-Orient Park.

== Geography ==
Orient Park boundaries include Uceta Yard to the south, Tampa Bypass Canal to the east, East Lake to the north, and Grant Park and Florence Villa to the west.

Major surface roads include U.S. Highway 301 and Broadway.

== Education ==
The community of Orient Park is served by Hillsborough County Schools.
