= Thonotosassa Branch Library =

Coordinates: 28.0576887°N 82.2953597°W

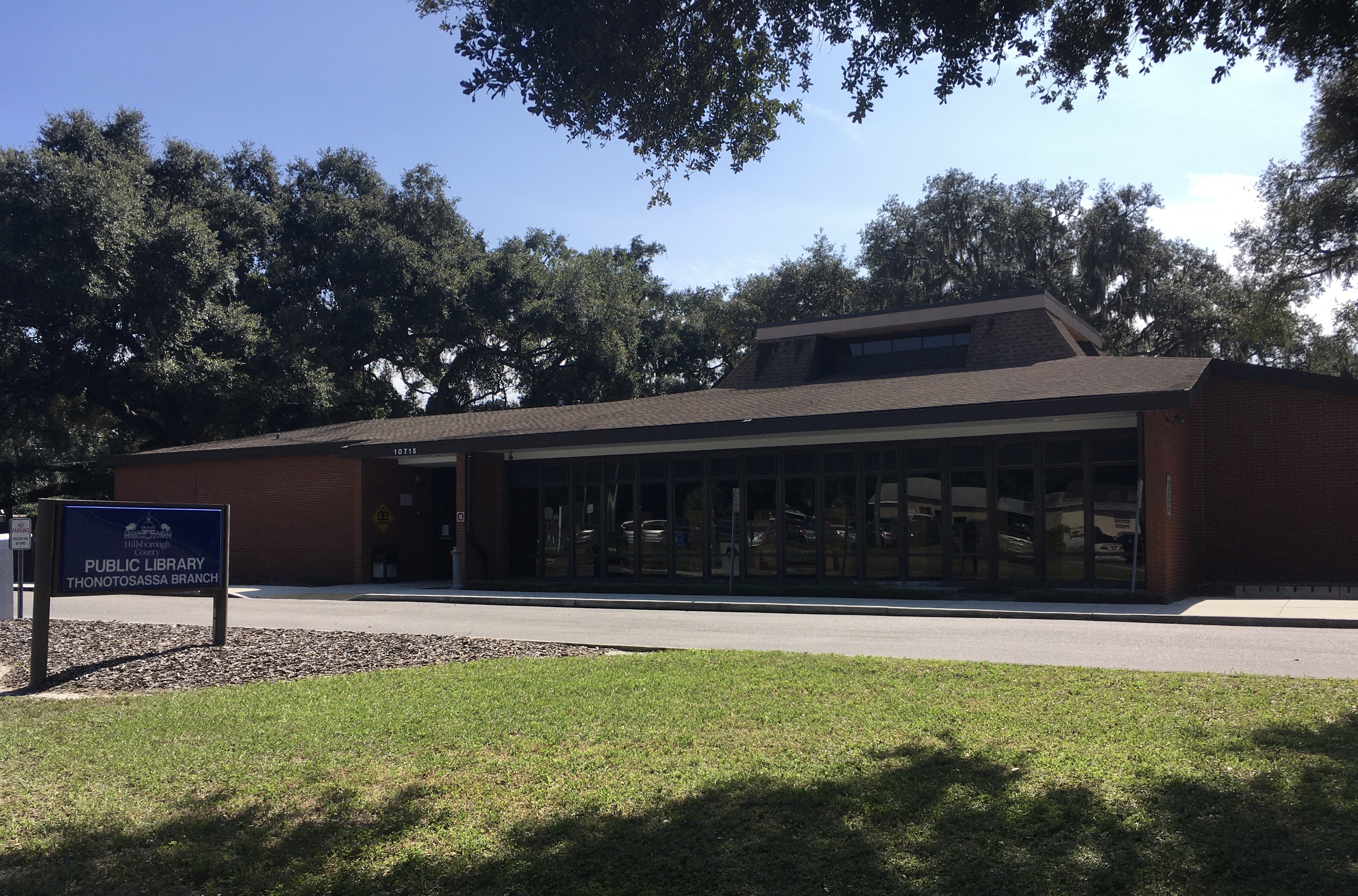
- Location: Thonotosassa, Florida, United States
- Established: 1989

Other information
- Website: www.hcplc.org/hcplc/locations/tho/

The Thonotosassa Branch Library is an 8,000 square foot library that serves the community of Thonotosassa as well as the rest of northeastern Hillsborough County. This rural Hillsborough County Branch provides easy access to library materials in physical and electronic format as well as Internet access, programs and technology classes for all ages. The Thonotosassa Branch library is a part of the Tampa-Hillsborough County Public Library System.

== History ==
The Friends of the Thonotosassa Library Association, led by Cindy Schlaudraff began their efforts to open a library in Thonotosassa, Florida in 1982 when they approached the Library board with their request. The library’s construction began on June 4, 1988. The construction, furnishing, and stocking of the building was from a grant funded by the United States Government’s Community Development Block Grant program. The library opened on July 22, 1989 and was Hillsborough County’s 16th branch at the time. The library was built on two acres of county park land on Main Street. The new library, an 8,000 square foot building that was federally funded and cost $860,000 to construct, has the ability to accommodate 25,000 to 30,000 volumes of literature and 106 patrons at a time.

== Programs and Services ==
The Thonotosassa Branch library provides various library programs including: walk in technology help, storytime for children, arts and crafts for children, and job counseling. The Thonotosassa Branch Library offers a variety of services such as access to current print and e-book fiction and non-fiction titles, access to online databases, and access to internet computers. As with all branches of the Tampa-Hillsborough County Public Library system, the Thonotosassa Branch library also offers computers with internet access, free public WiFi, copying, printing and also wireless printing, scanning, faxing, and public meeting rooms.
