= Florida State Road 585 (pre-2016) =

State highway in Florida, United States

State Road 585
- 22nd Street

Route information
- Maintained by FDOT
- Length: 2.782 mi (4.477 km)
- Existed: ?–2016

Major junctions
- South end: US 41 Bus. / SR 60 in Tampa
- I-4 in Tampa
- North end: US 41 / US 92 in Tampa

Location
- Country: United States
- State: Florida
- Counties: Hillsborough

Highway system
- Florida State Highway System; Interstate; US; State; Former; Pre‑1945; Toll; Scenic
← SR 584	→ SR 586

State Road 585 (SR 585) was a 2.782-mile-long (4.477 km), north–south state highway in Tampa, Florida connecting U.S. Route 41 Business (US 41 Bus.) with Interstate 4 (I-4) and US 92. The completion of the I-4/Selmon Expressway Connector provided a new corridor for traffic traveling between the two freeways, resulting in the Florida Department of Transportation relinquishing SR 585 to the city of Tampa in December 2016.

== Route description ==
SR 585's southern terminus was at SR 60 which also carries US 41 Bus. and SR 45. Here acting as a one-way pair, SR 585's northbound lanes were carried on 22nd Street while the southbound lanes were on 21st Street. Interstate 4 was the next major intersection of SR 585. The two sets of streets merged where it continued north on 22nd Street to intersect SR 574. The northern terminus of SR 585 was US 92 where the roadway continued north as 22nd Street. SR 585 was to the east side of Downtown Tampa but remained within the city limits throughout its entire course.

== Major intersections ==
The entire route is in Tampa, Hillsborough County.

mi	km	Destinations	Notes
0.000	0.000	US 41 Bus. / SR 60 (Adamo Drive / 21st Street / SR 45) – Cruise Terminals 2 Thru 6, Port Cargo, Ferry Terminal 7	
0.309	0.497	CR 574 (East 7th Avenue)	
0.64	1.03	I-4 (SR 400) to I-75 / I-275 – Orlando	I-4 exit 1
1.771	2.850	SR 574 (East Dr. Martin Luther King Jr. Boulevard)	
2.782	4.477	US 41 / US 92 (East Hillsborough Avenue / SR 600)	
1.000 mi = 1.609 km; 1.000 km = 0.621 mi
