= East Lake-Orient Park, Florida =

- Census-designated place
- Location in Hillsborough County and the state of Florida
- Coordinates: 28°00′02″N 82°22′26″W
- Country: United States
- State: Florida
- County: Hillsborough

Area
  - Total: 16.92 sq mi (43.83 km^{2})
  - Land: 15.81 sq mi (40.96 km^{2})
  - Water: 1.11 sq mi (2.87 km^{2})
- Elevation: 26 ft (7.9 m)

Population (2020)
  - Total: 28,050
  - Density: 1,773.8/sq mi (684.85/km^{2})
- Time zone: UTC-5 (Eastern (EST))
  - Summer (DST): UTC-4 (EDT)
- Area code: 813
- FIPS code: 12-19212
- GNIS feature ID: 2402431

East Lake-Orient Park is an unincorporated census-designated place in Hillsborough County, Florida, United States, in the Tampa Bay area. As of the 2020 census, East Lake-Orient Park had a population of 28,050. The area is the home of the Florida State Fairgrounds, which hosts the Florida State Fair in mid-February of each year. It was previously home to East Lake Square Mall. The ZIP code for East Lake-Orient Park is 33610 (East Lake) and 33619 (Orient Park).

== Geography ==
East Lake-Orient Park is located in north-central Hillsborough County. The CDP includes the communities of East Lake, Orient Park, and Del Rio. It is bordered by the city of Tampa to the south and west, Temple Terrace to the north, Thonotosassa and Mango to the east, and Brandon to the southeast. U.S. Route 301 and Interstate 4 run through the community, crossing near the center of the CDP. US 301 leads northeast 21 miles (34 km) to Zephyrhills and south 9 miles (14 km) to Riverview, while I-4 leads east 27 miles (43 km) to Lakeland and west 8 miles (13 km) to downtown Tampa. Interstate 75 forms the eastern edge of the East Lake-Orient Park CDP, leading north 93 miles (150 km) to Ocala and south 42 miles (68 km) to Bradenton.

According to the United States Census Bureau, the CDP has a total area of 17.4 square miles (45.0 km^{2}), of which 16.3 square miles (42.3 km^{2}) are land and 1.0 square mile (2.7 km^{2}), or 6.06%, are water. The Tampa Bypass Canal crosses the CDP from north to south.

== Demographics ==
Historical population
Census	Pop.	Note	%±
1970	5,697		—
1980	5,612		−1.5%
1990	6,171		10.0%
2000	5,703		−7.6%
2010	22,753		299.0%
2020	28,050		23.3%

=== Racial and ethnic composition ===
East Lake-Orient Park CDP, Florida – Racial and ethnic composition Note: the US Census treats Hispanic/Latino as an ethnic category. This table excludes Latinos from the racial categories and assigns them to a separate category. Hispanics/Latinos may be of any race.
Race / Ethnicity (NH = Non-Hispanic)	Pop 2000	Pop 2010	Pop 2020	% 2000	% 2010	% 2020
White alone (NH)	3,249	7,948	6,953	56.97%	34.93%	24.79%
Black or African American alone (NH)	1,559	9,573	11,573	27.34%	42.07%	41.26%
Native American or Alaska Native alone (NH)	57	85	50	1.00%	0.37%	0.18%
Asian alone (NH)	35	635	1,461	0.61%	2.79%	5.21%
Native Hawaiian or Pacific Islander alone (NH)	0	5	26	0.00%	0.02%	0.09%
Other race alone (NH)	12	58	160	0.21%	0.25%	0.57%
Mixed race or Multiracial (NH)	109	533	1,092	1.91%	2.34%	3.89%
Hispanic or Latino (any race)	682	3,916	6,735	11.96%	17.21%	24.01%
Total	5,703	22,753	28,050	100.00%	100.00%	100.00%

=== 2020 census ===
As of the 2020 census, East Lake-Orient Park had a population of 28,050. The median age was 32.8 years. 27.3% of residents were under the age of 18 and 10.3% of residents were 65 years of age or older. For every 100 females there were 91.5 males, and for every 100 females age 18 and over there were 86.4 males age 18 and over.

100.0% of residents lived in urban areas, while 0.0% lived in rural areas.

There were 10,425 households in East Lake-Orient Park, of which 37.3% had children under the age of 18 living in them. Of all households, 30.7% were married-couple households, 21.1% were households with a male householder and no spouse or partner present, and 38.5% were households with a female householder and no spouse or partner present. About 26.5% of all households were made up of individuals and 7.4% had someone living alone who was 65 years of age or older.

There were 11,201 housing units, of which 6.9% were vacant. The homeowner vacancy rate was 1.9% and the rental vacancy rate was 6.6%.

Racial composition as of the 2020 census
Race	Number	Percent
White	8,385	29.9%
Black or African American	12,005	42.8%
American Indian and Alaska Native	137	0.5%
Asian	1,490	5.3%
Native Hawaiian and Other Pacific Islander	31	0.1%
Some other race	2,332	8.3%
Two or more races	3,670	13.1%

=== 2010 census ===
As of the 2010 census, there were 22,753 people, residing in the census area. The population density was 1,302.0 inhabitants per square mile (502.7/km^{2}). The racial makeup of the census area was 42.8% White, 47.3% Black or African American, 0.4% Native American, 2.1% Asian, 3.7% from other races, and 3.6% from two or more races. Hispanic or Latino of any race were 16.9% of the population.

There were 1,998 households, out of which 35.4% had children under the age of 18 living with them, 48.1% were married couples living together, 19.0% had a female householder with no husband present, and 26.2% were non-families. 20.3% of all households were made up of individuals, and 6.8% had someone living alone who was 65 years of age or older. The average household size was 2.85 and the average family size was 3.24.

In the census area the population was spread out, with 28.9% under the age of 18, 8.7% from 18 to 24, 29.0% from 25 to 44, 23.7% from 45 to 64, and 9.7% who were 65 years of age or older. The median age was 34 years. For every 100 females, there were 97.1 males. For every 100 females age 18 and over, there were 93.3 males.

The median income for a household in the census area was $34,352, and the median income for a family was $36,750. Males had a median income of $27,434 versus $21,935 for females. The per capita income for the community was $14,489. About 11.4% of families and 14.6% of the population were below the poverty line, including 20.4% of those under age 18 and 16.7% of those age 65 or over.

== East Lake Square Mall ==
East Lake Square Mall was a shopping mall located within the area. It was opened in 1976 and operated until 1998, when sales and customer volume declined sharply after the opening of the Brandon Town Center in nearby Brandon. The mall featured several major retailers and a branch library, which moved its operations to nearby Mango after the mall's closing. The mall was quickly converted to an office park called NetPark Tampa Bay.
