= Armwood High School =

Public high school in Seffner, Florida, United States

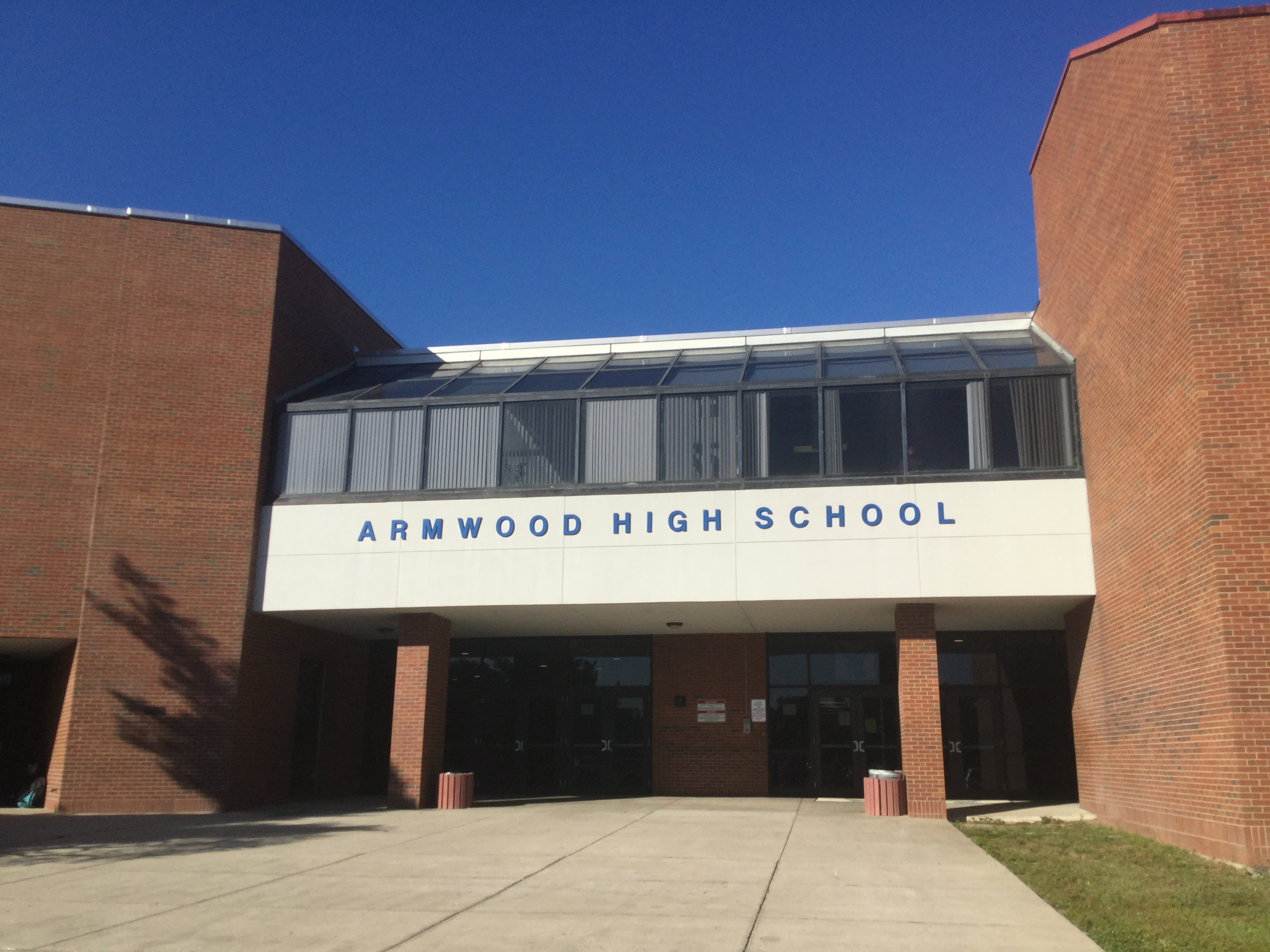

Location
- 12000 U.S. Route 92; Seffner, Florida 33584; United States; 28°00′11″N 82°17′48″W

Information
- Type: Public high school
- Established: 1984
- School district: Hillsborough County Public Schools
- Principal: Dina Langston
- Teaching staff: 97.00 FTEs
- Grades: 9–12
- Enrollment: 2,310 (2023–2024)
- Student to teacher ratio: 23.81
- Colors: Blue; Grey; Maroon
- Team name: Hawks
- Website: www.hillsboroughschools.org/o/armwood

Armwood Senior High School is a public high school located in Seffner, Florida, United States, on U.S. Highway 92. It opened in August 1984.

The school is named after Blanche Armwood, a longtime Tampa resident, educator and activist. The Armwood family lived in Seffner and became prominent community leaders in Tampa and Florida. She married a lawyer and established schools teaching “household arts.” She oversaw Hillsborough County's schools for African Americans and became a lawyer.

As of the 2014–15 school year, the school had an enrollment of 1,809 students and 104.0 classroom teachers (on an FTE basis), for a student–teacher ratio of 17.4:1. There were 1,227 students (67.8% of enrollment) eligible for free lunch and 167 (9.2% of students) eligible for reduced-cost lunch.

== Demographics ==
Armwood High School is 34.3% Black, 31.7% Hispanic, 27.4% White, 1.4% Asian, 4.3% multi-racial, 0.5% Pacific Islander, and 0.4% American Indian.

== Florida Department of Education grade ==
- 2008 C
- 2009 D
- 2010 C
- 2011 B
- 2012 C
- 2013 C
- 2014 C
- 2015 C
- 2016 D
- 2017 C
- 2018 C
- 2019 A

== Athletics ==
Armwood's athletic teams compete as the Hawks, using the school colors blue and grey. The following sports are offered at Armwood:

- Baseball (boys)
- Basketball (girls & boys)
- Cross country (girls & boys)
- Flag football (girls)
- Football (boys)
  - State champs - 2003, 2004
- Golf (girls & boys)
- Soccer (girls & boys)
- Softball (girls)
- Swimming (girls & boys)
- Tennis (girls & boys)
- Track and field (girls & boys)
- Volleyball (girls)
- Wrestling (boys)

In 2011, Armwood won the class 6A state championship game, but was stripped of the title after both the Hawks and their opponent, Miami Central High School, were determined to have used ineligible players. The FHSAA subsequently vacated the title completely, leaving 2011 without a 6A champ.

== The Collegiate Academy ==
Starting with the 2013–2014 school year, Armwood High School has been home to the Collegiate Academy at Armwood High School. The Academy provides students with an opportunity to earn an Associate of Arts degree (A.A.) through Hillsborough Community College in addition to their high school diploma. The students take college courses, free of cost (including textbooks), during the school day. The Academy provides academic preparation and other types of “college knowledge,” such as self-management of study routines and preparation for assessments, handling the pace and expectations of college courses, and strategic use of resources such as college advisers and ambassadors from local college campuses.

== Notable alumni ==
- Jarriett Buie, NFL defensive end for the Tampa Bay Buccaneers
- Byron Cowart, NFL defensive tackle for the New England Patriots
- Jerome Ford, NFL running back for the Cleveland Browns
- Sterling Hitchcock, retired Major League Baseball pitcher
- Sterling Hofrichter, football player
- Matt Jones, NFL running back for the Philadelphia Eagles
- Matt Joyce, Major League Baseball player for the Tampa Bay Rays
- Leon McQuay, NFL defensive back for the Kansas City Chiefs
- Jonathan Ordway, Arena Football League player for the Chicago Rush
- Mike Pearson, NFL offensive lineman for Jacksonville Jaguars
- Eric Striker, NFL linebacker for the Buffalo Bills
- Desmond Watson, NFL defensive tackle for the Tampa Bay Buccaneers
