= Mango, Florida =

- Census-designated place
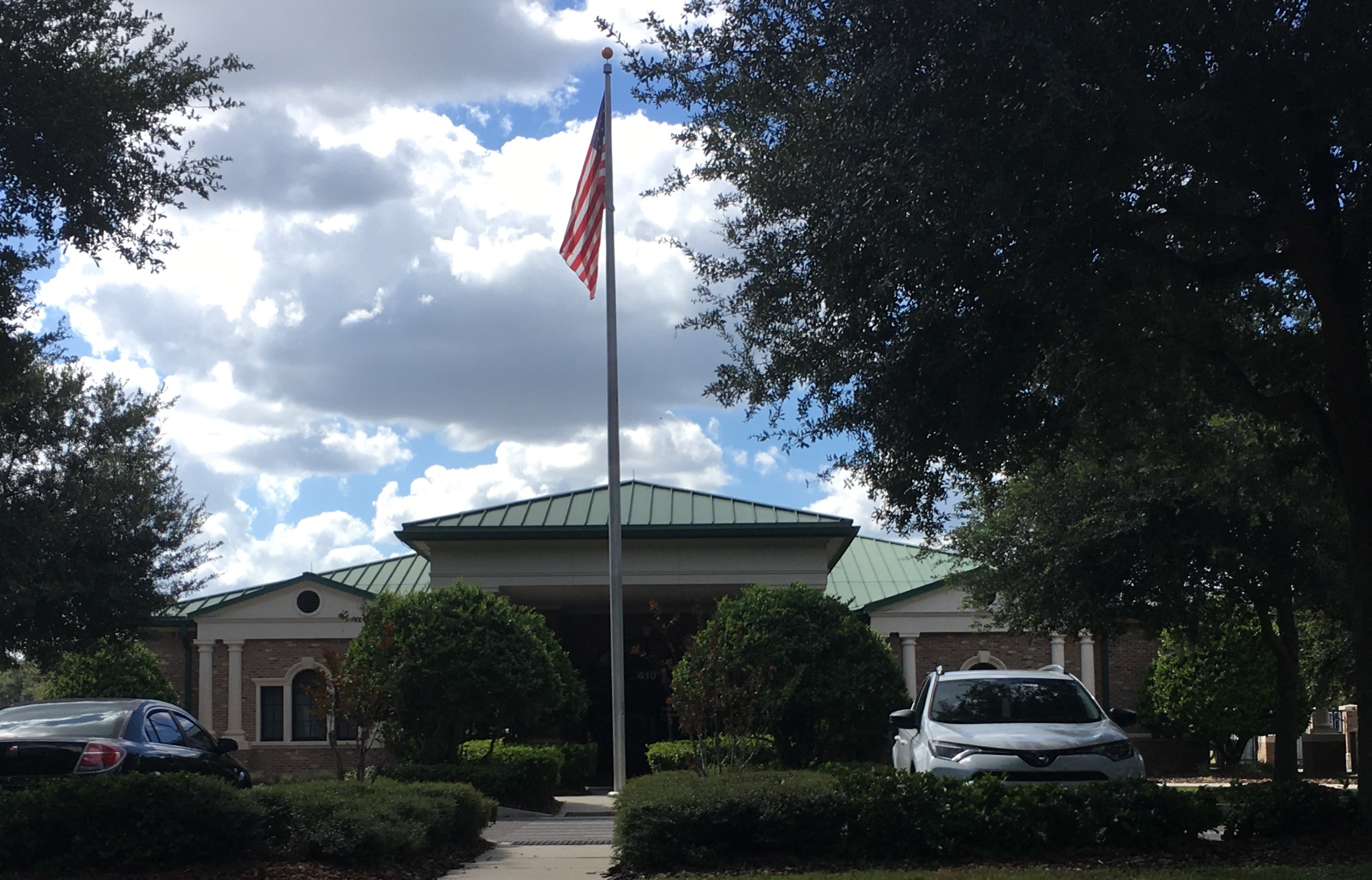
- Seffner-Mango Branch Library

- Location in Hillsborough County and the state of Florida
- Coordinates: 27°59′50″N 82°18′18″W
- Country: United States
- State: Florida
- County: Hillsborough

Area
  - Total: 4.81 sq mi (12.46 km^{2})
  - Land: 4.67 sq mi (12.09 km^{2})
  - Water: 0.14 sq mi (0.37 km^{2})
- Elevation: 33 ft (10 m)

Population (2020)
  - Total: 12,699
  - Density: 2,720.5/sq mi (1,050.38/km^{2})
- Time zone: UTC-5 (Eastern (EST))
  - Summer (DST): UTC-4 (EDT)
- ZIP code: 33550
- Area code: 813
- FIPS code: 12-42850
- GNIS feature ID: 2403254

Mango is a census-designated place (CDP) in Hillsborough County, Florida, United States. The population was 12,699 at 2020 census, up from the 11,313 at the 2010 census.

== Geography ==
Mango is located north of the geographic center of Hillsborough County. It is bordered to the north by Thonotosassa, to the east by Seffner, to the south by Brandon, and to the west by East Lake-Orient Park. Interstate 4 forms the northern boundary of the CDP, and Interstate 75 is the western boundary. The main road through the center of Mango is Dr. Martin Luther King Jr. Boulevard (Florida State Road 574). Downtown Tampa is 10 miles (16 km) to the west, and Plant City is 12 miles (19 km) to the east.

According to the United States Census Bureau, the Mango CDP has a total area of 4.8 square miles (12.4 km^{2}), of which 4.7 square miles (12.1 km^{2}) are land and 0.1 square miles (0.3 km^{2}), or 2.95%, are water.

== Demographics ==
Historical population
Census	Pop.	Note	%±
1990	8,700		—
2000	8,842		1.6%
2010	11,313		27.9%
2020	12,699		12.3%

=== Racial and ethnic composition ===
Mango CDP, Florida – Racial and ethnic composition Note: the US Census treats Hispanic/Latino as an ethnic category. This table excludes Latinos from the racial categories and assigns them to a separate category. Hispanics/Latinos may be of any race.
Race / Ethnicity (NH = Non-Hispanic)	Pop 2000	Pop 2010	Pop 2020	% 2000	% 2010	% 2020
White alone (NH)	7,163	6,440	5,159	81.01%	56.93%	40.63%
Black or African American alone (NH)	557	1,614	2,278	6.30%	14.27%	17.94%
Native American or Alaska Native alone (NH)	44	52	56	0.50%	0.46%	0.44%
Asian alone (NH)	58	171	192	0.66%	1.51%	1.51%
Native Hawaiian or Pacific Islander alone (NH)	3	13	7	0.03%	0.11%	0.06%
Other race alone (NH)	12	16	92	0.14%	0.14%	0.72%
Mixed race or Multiracial (NH)	195	209	546	2.21%	1.85%	4.30%
Hispanic or Latino (any race)	810	2,798	4,369	9.16%	24.73%	34.40%
Total	8,842	11,313	12,699	100.00%	100.00%	100.00%

=== 2020 census ===
As of the 2020 census, Mango had a population of 12,699. The median age was 33.2 years. 26.8% of residents were under the age of 18 and 11.3% of residents were 65 years of age or older. For every 100 females there were 95.2 males, and for every 100 females age 18 and over there were 90.2 males age 18 and over.

100.0% of residents lived in urban areas, while 0.0% lived in rural areas.

There were 4,620 households in Mango, of which 37.6% had children under the age of 18 living in them. Of all households, 33.2% were married-couple households, 19.6% were households with a male householder and no spouse or partner present, and 35.5% were households with a female householder and no spouse or partner present. About 23.5% of all households were made up of individuals and 9.6% had someone living alone who was 65 years of age or older.

There were 4,887 housing units, of which 5.5% were vacant. The homeowner vacancy rate was 1.4% and the rental vacancy rate was 3.9%.

Racial composition as of the 2020 census
Race	Number	Percent
White	5,960	46.9%
Black or African American	2,449	19.3%
American Indian and Alaska Native	115	0.9%
Asian	195	1.5%
Native Hawaiian and Other Pacific Islander	7	0.1%
Some other race	1,631	12.8%
Two or more races	2,342	18.4%

=== 2010 census ===
By 2010 the census showed 11,313 people, a 28% increase over 2000.

=== 2000 census ===
At the 2000 census there were 8,842 people, 3,289 households, and 2,302 families residing in the community. The population density was 1,927.1 inhabitants per square mile (744.1/km^{2}). There were 3,617 housing units at an average density of 788.3 per square mile (304.4/km^{2}). The racial makeup of the community was 86.97% White, 6.44% African American, 0.58% Native American, 0.72% Asian, 0.05% Pacific Islander, 2.40% from other races, and 2.85% from two or more races. Hispanic or Latino of any race were 9.16%.

Of the 3,289 households, 37.0% had children under the age of 18 living with them, 46.0% were married couples living together, 17.1% had a female householder with no husband present, and 30.0% were non-families. 22.1% of households were one person, and 6.2% were one person aged 65 or older. The average household size was 2.68 and the average family size was 3.10.

In the community the population was spread out, with 29.1% under the age of 18, 8.7% from 18 to 24, 32.8% from 25 to 44, 21.0% from 45 to 64, and 8.4% 65 or older. The median age was 33 years. For every 100 females, there were 100.8 males. For every 100 females age 18 and over, there were 96.3 males.

The median household income was $33,989 and the median family income was $37,818. Males had a median income of $29,038 versus $22,947 for females. The per capita income for the community was $15,478. About 9.1% of families and 12.6% of the population were below the poverty line, including 20.1% of those under age 18 and 4.0% of those age 65 or over.

== Schools ==
=== Public schools ===
==== Elementary schools ====
- Mango Elementary School

== See also ==
- Mango-Seffner, Florida, a single census area recorded during the 1980 census.
