= Edward J. DeBartolo Corporation =

Defunct American shopping mall developer

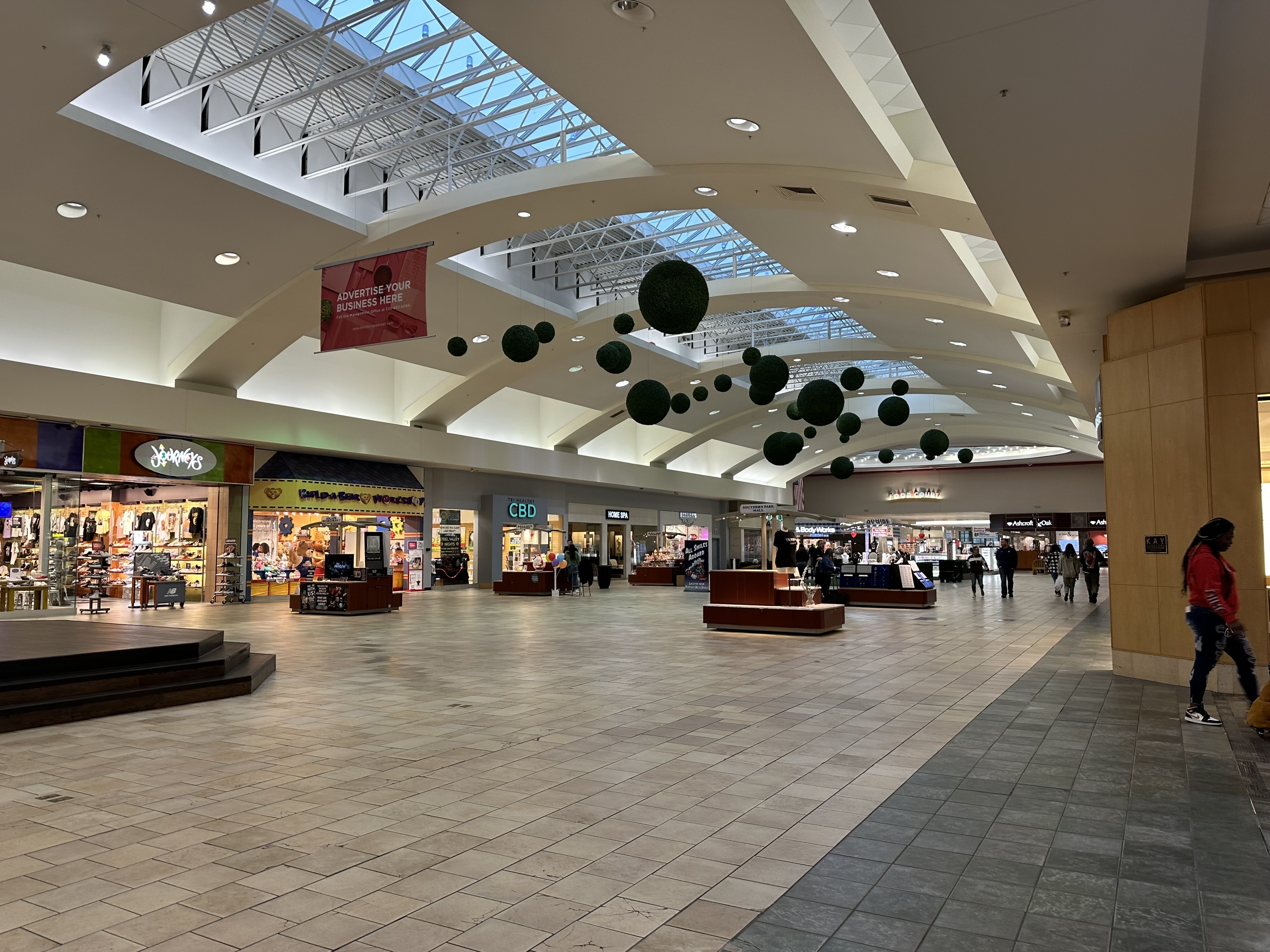
- The DeBartolo Corporation's Southern Park Mall located in the company's hometown of Boardman, Ohio.
- Type: Private (1948–2001); Public (1994–1996, for DeBartolo Realty Corp.)
- Industry: Real estate
- Founded: 1948; 78 years ago
- Founder: Edward J. DeBartolo Sr.
- Defunct: March 1996 (DeBartolo Realty Corporation); February 2001 (Edward J. DeBartolo Corporation)
- Fate: Dissolved; retail properties spun-off into DeBartolo Realty Corporation, which merged with Simon Property Group to form Simon DeBartolo Group.
- Successors: Simon Property Group; DeBartolo Development; DeBartolo Holdings; DeBartolo Sports & Entertainment
- Headquarters: Boardman, Ohio, United States
- Products: Shopping malls; Strip plazas; Sports franchises
- Website: debartolodevelopment.com

The Edward J. DeBartolo Corporation was an American real estate development company based in Boardman, Ohio. The company was founded by Edward J. DeBartolo Sr. in 1948. After its retail properties were spun-off into the DeBartolo Realty Corporation in 1994, Simon Property Group merged with the latter in 1996, while the DeBartolo Corporation was dissolved in 2001.

After the merger, Simon briefly rebranded as Simon DeBartolo Group before reverting to its former name in 1998. After the original company went defunct in 2001, it was split into two separate businesses owned by the DeBartolo Group and ran by a specific member of the DeBartolo family; DeBartolo Development, and DeBartolo Sports & Entertainment.

== History ==
=== 1944–1970: Founding and early projects ===
After serving in the U.S. Army Corps of Engineers during World War II, civil engineer Edward J. DeBartolo Sr. returned to his home in Youngstown, Ohio in 1944. In 1948, he founded the Edward J. DeBartolo Corporation to capitalize on the post-war population shift away from inner cities. Guided by DeBartolo's motto, "Stay out in the country, that's the new downtown," the company's first strip mall and project in the Youngstown metropolitan area was the Belmont Avenue Shopping Plaza, followed by the Greater Boardman Plaza in 1951, eight miles near their headquarters.

=== 1960s–1970s ===
In 1960, the DeBartolo Corporation acquired the Thistledown Racing Club for $5.1 million. In October 1965, Summit Mall in Fairlawn, Ohio, was one of the company's first regional enclosed malls. Throughout this period, since the company was based in Youngstown, which was infamous regarding a turf war between Cleveland and Pittsburgh Mafia families, the corporation persistently faced suspicion from the public and federal governments. The corporation's development operations were heavily targeted by organized crime, which repeatedly triggered federal authorities to investigate DeBartolo Sr. for potential, alleged mob connections.

Louisiana Downs opened on October 30, 1974. Randall Park Mall opened on August 11, 1976, briefly holding the title of the largest mall in the world, on the former site of the Randall Park Racetrack. Eddie DeBartolo Sr. purchased the San Francisco 49ers in 1977 for $17 million, placing his son, Edward J. DeBartolo Jr., in charge. In 1978, the corporation purchased the NHL franchise out of receivership, stabilizing the team's operations in Western Pennsylvania.

=== 1980–2001: Final decades ===
The company made an aggressive expansion in development in Florida, including the Aventura Mall in Aventura, which opened in April 1983 and was developed in partnership with Oxford Development, being the largest mall in the state. In 1983, the corporation filed a lawsuit against the National Labor Relations Board (NLRB) after it attempted to boycott DeBartolo's East Lake Square Mall in Tampa over a tenant using non-unionized construction workers. The Supreme Court ruled that the National Labor Relations Act's (NLRA) "publicity proviso" did not protect the union's actions, as the mall owner and other tenants did not distribute the company's products.

As a result of several years' impaired cash flow, DeBartolo prepared to take his company public as a real estate investment trust (REIT). Most of DeBartolo's competitors were preparing to do the same, with their operations suffering from a lack of capital in the private markets. In late 1993, the two largest shopping center companies at the time, DeBartolo and Simon Property Group were coming to the market simultaneously. Their advisors informed them that the capital markets could not absorb that much equity; either one of them must back down or prices would suffer severely. DeBartolo agreed to withdraw. In April 1994, most of the retail properties owned by the DeBartolo Corporation were spun-off to DeBartolo Realty Corporation, a public REIT, in its initial public offering. The new company was chaired by Edward J. DeBartolo Jr.; DeBartolo Sr. was unwilling to deal personally with the constraints of running a public company. In March 1996, the DeBartolo Realty Corporation merged with Simon Property Group of Indianapolis, Indiana for $3 billion.

When the merger closed, the combined company was branded Simon DeBartolo Group Inc. However, DeBartolo Jr. resigned after a federal investigation started to determine whether he committed fraud related to a casino license in Louisiana, and Simon acquired Corporate Property Investors (CPI) in March 1998, reverting its name back to "Simon Property Group" that year.

In April 1999, the corporation filed a lawsuit against DeBartolo Jr. accusing him of reneging on a $94 million debt and trying to cut side-deals regarding a major stadium-mall project. A settlement in February 2001 led to the remaining private holdings, family business operations, and entertainment assets of the main Edward J. DeBartolo Corporation were officially split between DeBartolo Sr.'s children, Edward J. DeBartolo Jr. and Denise DeBartolo York, forming separate entities DeBartolo Development and DeBartolo Holdings.

== See also ==
- Category:Shopping malls developed by Edward J. DeBartolo Corporation
