= Seffner-Mango Branch Library =

Public library in Seffner, Florida

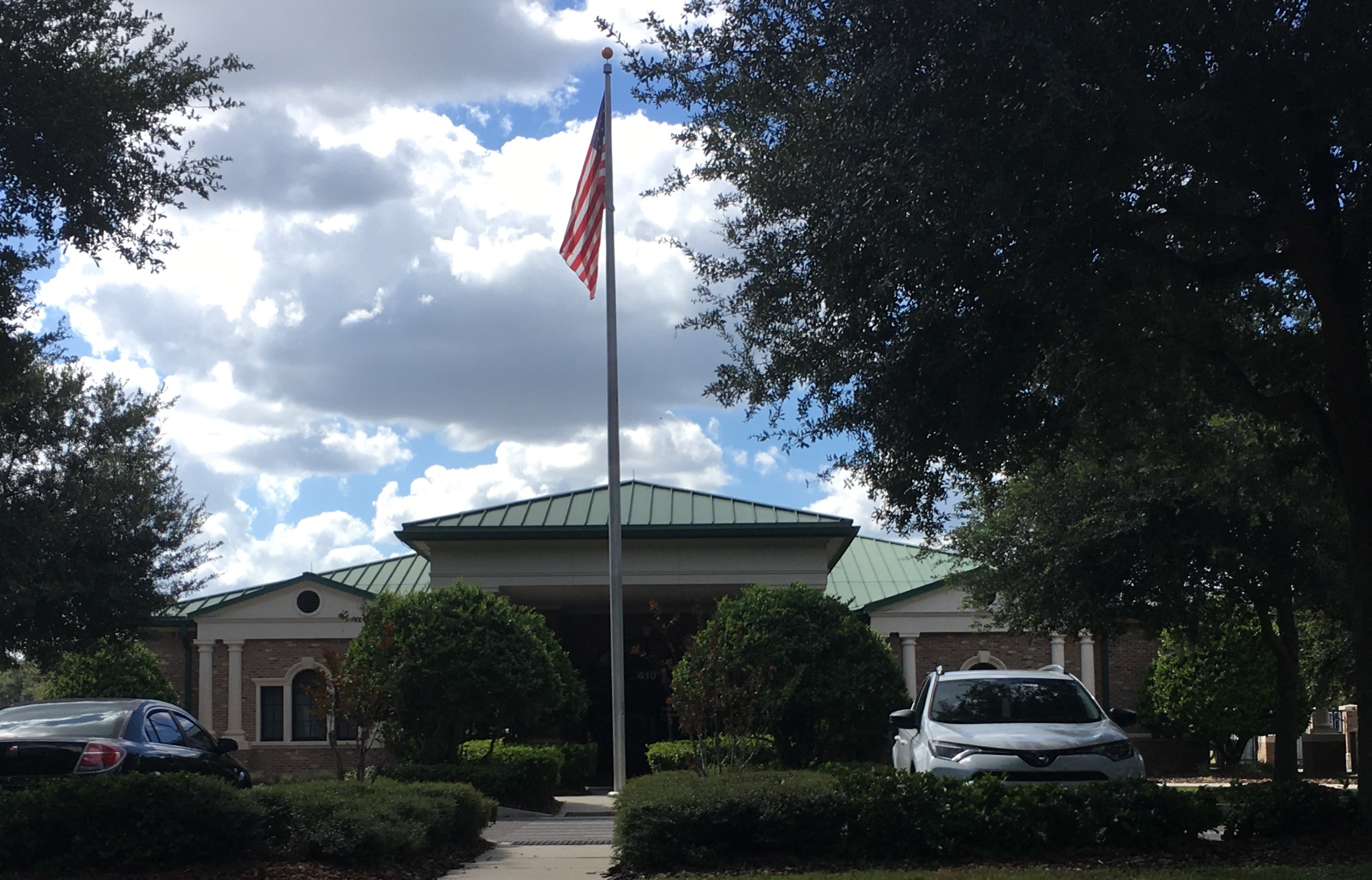
- 28°00′03″N 82°16′43″W
- Location: Seffner, Florida, United States
- Established: 2009 (current location)

Other information
- Website: hcplc.org/locations/seffner-mango

The Seffner-Mango Branch Library is a 15,000 square feet facility located on 410 N Kingsway Road, in Seffner, Florida. It is part of the Tampa–Hillsborough County Public Library System (THPL).

The library holds 84,524 volumes and offers free wireless access, 14 Internet-connected computers, photocopiers, public FAX access, snack/beverage vending machines, and a public meeting room. The Seffner-Mango Branch serves the two communities of Seffner and Mango.

== History ==
Before the Seffner-Mango Branch Library was renamed, the library served as the Eastlake Branch Library. As part of the Tampa-Hillsborough County Public Library System, this library opened on April 29, 1988, inside the Eastlake Square Shopping Mall on E. Hillsborough Avenue and 56th street. The mall closed in 1998, forcing the library to temporarily close on May 11, 1998.

The Eastlake Branch Library moved its operations to a new 6,000 square foot rental location on East Dr. Martin Luther King Jr. Boulevard, next to the Walmart in Mango Plaza. This library introduced the new name, Seffner-Mango Branch Library, and officially reopened on December 29, 1998. The Seffner-Mango Branch Library served the local community for a decade at this location before ground was broken for a new library building replacement, in 2008.

On January 15, 2009, the new and current Seffner-Mango Branch Library location was opened to the public on Kingsway Road in Seffner. This location is a 15,000 square foot facility next to the Seffner Community Park, and serves the Seffner and Mango community.

== Services ==
=== Friends of the Library ===
The Friends of the Library operate a book store in the branch lobby. The proceeds from the store help fund library programs and provide support for library operations.

The library hosts events like Movie and Popcorn Night, Story Time, and a Summer Garden Club, Seffner Stitching Society, Once a Month Book Discussions, and a game zone.

=== Technology ===
Similar to all Hillsborough County public libraries, the Seffner-Mango Branch Library offers technological services including computers with Internet access, printing, copiers, and public Wi-Fi. Computers can be used free of charge, with a personal library card number, for up to 180 minutes per day. The Seffner-Mango Branch Library also provides assistive technology to patrons with disabilities.

=== Park & Surf ===
The Seffner-Mango Branch Library is one of the numerous select Hillsborough County libraries that offer Park & Surf Wi-Fi service from 7:00 a.m. to 11 p.m. Patrons can access public Wi-Fi by parking close to the building at designated Park & Surf parking spots and connecting their devices.

== Special collections ==
The Seffner-Mango Branch Library has acquired a "distinctive collection of photographs." These were taken by the photojournalist Carlton Ward Jr., from Tampa. They can be found throughout the reading room and in the children's area of the library.
