= Lake Thonotosassa =

Lake in the state of Florida, United States

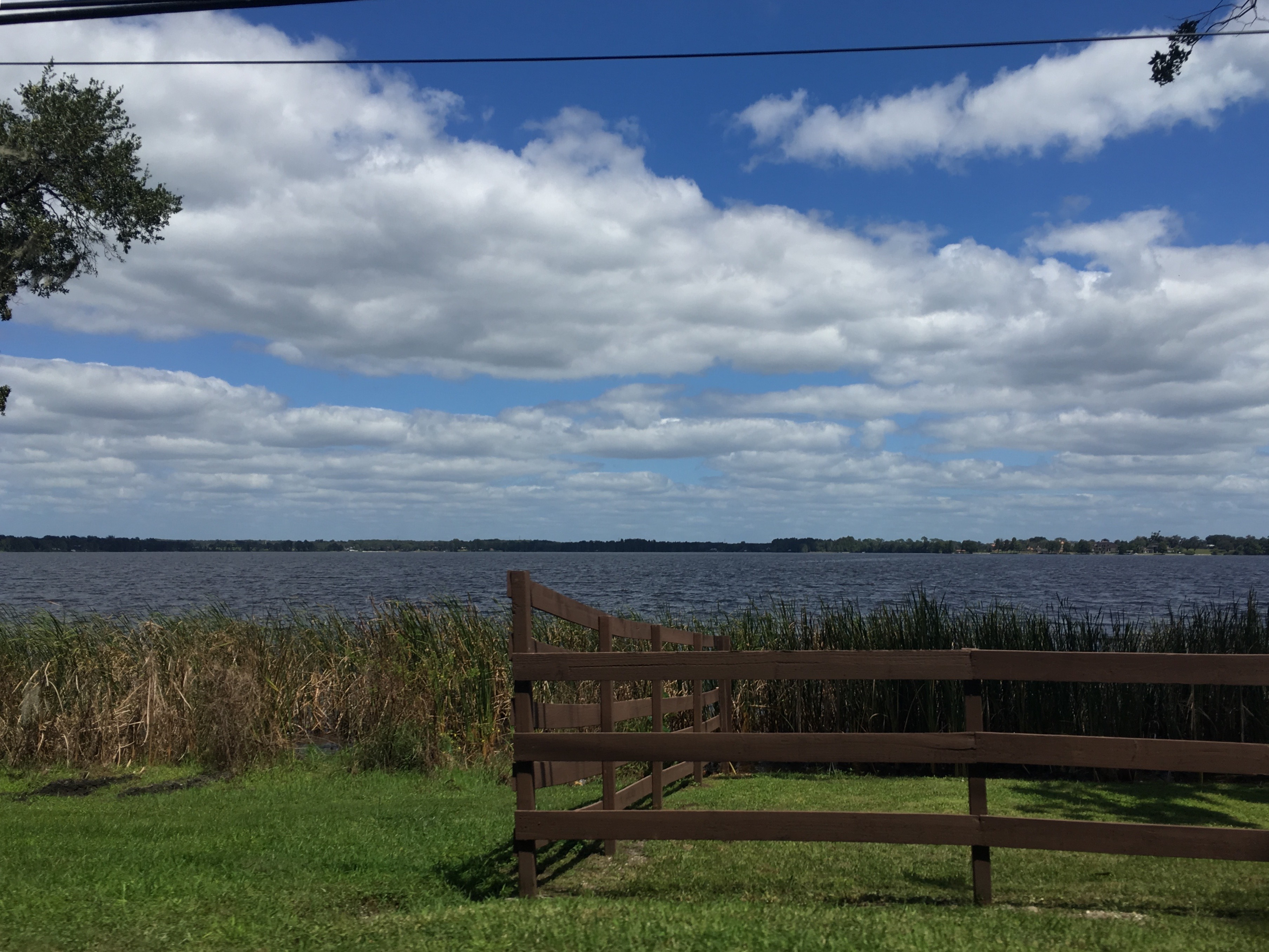
- A view of the lake from Thonotosassa Road

- Location within Florida Location within the United States
- Location: Hillsborough County, Florida
- Coordinates: 28°03′39″N 82°16′45″W
- Surface area: 839 acres (340 ha)
- Surface elevation: 33 feet (10 m)

Lake Thonotosassa is an 839 acres (340 ha) lake named after Thonotosassa, Florida. Residential development surrounds the lake. There are no roads that cross it, but the four roads that go around it are: Taylor Road/Fort King Highway (west), Thonotosassa Road (south), McIntosh Road (east), and Knights-Griffin Road (north). U.S. Route 301 is about a quarter-mile northeast of the lake. The lake is owned and maintained by the Tampa Port Authority.
