= Seffner, Florida =

- Census-designated place
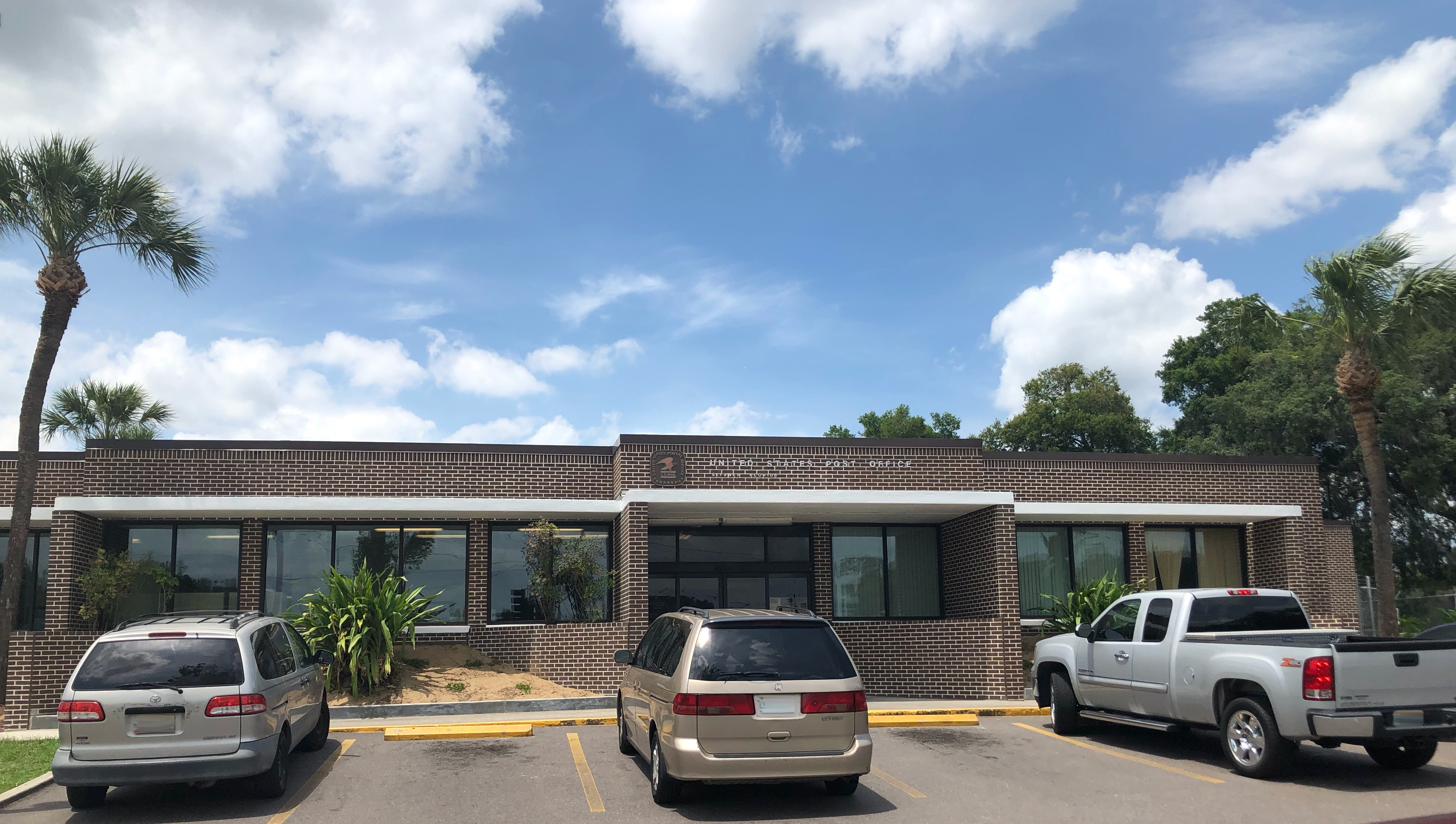
- Post office

- Location in Hillsborough County and the state of Florida
- Coordinates: 28°00′15″N 82°16′18″W
- Country: United States
- State: Florida
- County: Hillsborough

Area
  - Total: 3.81 sq mi (9.87 km^{2})
  - Land: 3.61 sq mi (9.34 km^{2})
  - Water: 0.20 sq mi (0.53 km^{2})
- Elevation: 69 ft (21 m)

Population (2020)
  - Total: 8,362
  - Density: 2,318.4/sq mi (895.12/km^{2})
- Time zone: UTC-5 (Eastern (EST))
  - Summer (DST): UTC-4 (EDT)
- ZIP codes: 33583-33584
- Area code: 813
- FIPS code: 12-64925
- GNIS feature ID: 2402836

Seffner is a census-designated place (CDP) in Hillsborough County, Florida, United States. The population at the 2020 census was 8,362, up from 7,579 at the 2010 census.

Located approximately 13 miles (21 km) east of downtown Tampa, Seffner is considered a suburb. Though still characterized by towering live oak trees, strawberry farms and lakes, Seffner has been growing rapidly in recent years, with housing subdivisions being added to the once rural landscape.

== History ==
The area southeast of the present-day community of Thonotosassa originally called Simmon’s Hammock is now known as Seffner. The Hammock was named for Baptist minister Daniel Simmon from Savannah, Georgia. Following the signing of the Treaty of Moultrie Creek and the establishment of Fort Brooke, Simmon set-up a mission to Native American (probably Seminole, Miccosukee, or Creek) people living near Lake Thonotosassa. This early settlement of Simmon's Hammock ended with the beginning of the Second Seminole War in late 1835. However, the Armed Occupation Act of 1842 following the cessation of hostilities reponed settlement into Hillsborough County. Following the Dade battle, Major-General Edmond P. Gaines led a group of U.S. soldiers through Simmon’s Hammock on their way to investigate the incident. In early 1836, Gaines reported that three homesteads in that area were burned to the ground.

Some historians claim that Seffner's streets were originally laid out in 1862, but not recorded as a plat formally until 1885.

Seffner's post office opened in 1884, when a new railroad line in the area had been planned (see Henry B. Plant). The community was named for its first postmaster, Frederick P. Seffner. That same year, Seffner's first school and store were opened. Seffner quickly became a prosperous small community with citrus groves, a hotel, one drug store, several dry goods stores, and a livery stable. When an epidemic of yellow fever hit Tampa in the fall of 1887 and in 1888, many Tampa refugees fled to Seffner for temporary shelter in the hotel. However, as refugees and mail arrived in Seffner, they were fumigated as protection from the epidemic. Among the refugees was T.C. Taliaferro of the First National Bank of Tampa, who operated a branch banking business from Seffner during the epidemic.

The cold in the winter of 1894–1895 brought disaster to Seffner. Many citizens left, while others remained to recoup their losses. Seffner survived and eventually regained its affluence. Attractive residential neighborhoods were built to accommodate the influx of desirable residents. By 1925, Seffner was the fourth-largest town in Hillsborough County.

The main thoroughfare leading north and south was Lenna Avenue, and leading east and west was Highway Number 23, renamed Buffalo Avenue, because of its erstwhile use as a buffalo trail, and then renamed again in 1989 to its current name, Dr. Martin Luther King Jr. Boulevard (Hwy 574). Seffner and neighboring Mango and Dover served as the three primary towns along the South Florida Railroad right-of-way between Tampa and Plant City. These towns owe their existence and prosperity to the railroad, each becoming an important shipping center.

== Geography ==
Seffner is located northeast of the center of Hillsborough County and is bordered by Thonotosassa to the north, Mango to the west, and Brandon to the south. Interstate 4 is the northern boundary of the CDP, and the southern boundary follows State Road 574 (Dr. Martin Luther King Jr. Boulevard). Plant City is 10 miles (16 km) to the east.

The Seffner CDP has a total area of 3.8 square miles (9.8 km^{2}), of which 3.6 square miles (9.3 km^{2}) are land and 0.2 square miles (0.5 km^{2}), or 5.34%, are water, according to the United States Census Bureau.

== Demographics ==
Historical population
Census	Pop.	Note	%±
1990	5,371		—
2000	5,467		1.8%
2010	7,579		38.6%
2020	8,362		10.3%

=== 2020 census ===
As of the 2020 census, Seffner had a population of 8,362. The median age was 40.4 years. 23.3% of residents were under the age of 18 and 14.6% of residents were 65 years of age or older. For every 100 females there were 97.7 males, and for every 100 females age 18 and over there were 93.6 males age 18 and over.

100.0% of residents lived in urban areas, while 0.0% lived in rural areas.

There were 2,971 households in Seffner, of which 32.8% had children under the age of 18 living in them. Of all households, 51.4% were married-couple households, 16.5% were households with a male householder and no spouse or partner present, and 24.2% were households with a female householder and no spouse or partner present. About 18.3% of all households were made up of individuals and 7.4% had someone living alone who was 65 years of age or older.

There were 3,104 housing units, of which 4.3% were vacant. The homeowner vacancy rate was 0.5% and the rental vacancy rate was 8.6%.

Racial composition as of the 2020 census
Race	Number	Percent
White	4,855	58.1%
Black or African American	1,321	15.8%
American Indian and Alaska Native	34	0.4%
Asian	372	4.4%
Native Hawaiian and Other Pacific Islander	1	0.0%
Some other race	668	8.0%
Two or more races	1,111	13.3%
Hispanic or Latino (of any race)	2,025	24.2%

=== 2000 census ===
As of the 2000 census, there were 5,467 people, 2,075 households, and 1,520 families residing in the community. The population density was 1,512.2 inhabitants per square mile (583.9/km^{2}). There were 2,168 housing units at an average density of 599.7 units per square mile (231.5 units/km^{2}). The racial makeup of the community was 91.35% White, 3.26% African American, 0.29% Native American, 1.02% Asian, 2.71% from other races, and 1.37% from two or more races. Hispanics or Latinos of any race were 8.21% of the population.

There were 2,075 households, out of which 34.9% had children under the age of 18 living with them, 56.1% were married couples living together, 11.7% had a female householder with no husband present, and 26.7% were non-families. 21.5% of all households were made up of individuals, and 8.9% had someone living alone who was 65 years of age or older. The average household size was 2.63 and the average family size was 3.04.

In the community the population was spread out, with 26.4% under the age of 18, 7.7% from 18 to 24, 29.9% from 25 to 44, 24.4% from 45 to 64, and 11.6% who were 65 years of age or older. The median age was 37 years. For every 100 females, there were 95.4 males. For every 100 females age 18 and over, there were 90.0 males.

The median income for a household in the community was $42,614, and the median income for a family was $49,152. Males had a median income of $32,266 versus $26,328 for females. The per capita income for the community was $19,888. About 3.2% of families and 4.6% of the population were below the poverty line, including 4.0% of those under age 18 and 7.5% of those age 65 or over.

== Arts and culture ==
=== Public library ===
The Seffner-Mango Branch Library is located in Seffner.

== Parks and recreation ==
There are six public parks in Seffner: Seffner-Mango Park, Evans Recreation Center, E.L. Bing Park, Higginbotham Park, Mango Dog Park, and Lakewood Park.

Lake Weeks is a lake located on the southeast side of Seffner. It has a surface area of 57.73 acres and is known for its fishing and Spanish moss.

Three recreation centers are located in Seffner. The Evans Recreation Center offers special programs for children ages 6–17 and it features a basketball court, playground equipment, a hockey court, a softball field, a football field, and a soccer field. The Mango Recreation Center has a large park with two basketball courts, two softball fields, a playground, and a 5-acre dog park. The Seffner Civic Center is a historical land site with a basketball court, picnic tables, a playground, and a large open field.

The Rodney Colson Sports Complex is a park with an open field, biking trail, and walking trail.

=== Wildlife conservation ===
The Life Fellowship Bird Sanctuary located in Seffner, affiliated with a local church. Birds and reptiles are kept there, and the facility is noted for its success in breeding rock iguanas in captivity.

== Education ==
=== Public schools ===
Hillsborough County Public Schools serves Seffner.

==== Elementary schools ====
- Colson Elementary
- Lopez Elementary
- McDonald Elementary
- Seffner Elementary

Pruner elementary

==== Middle schools ====
- Gordon Burnett Middle School
- Jennings Middle School

==== High schools ====
- Armwood High School

=== Private schools ===
- Hillsborough Baptist
- Impact Academy
- Legacy Christian Academy
- Livingstone Academy
- Seffner Christian Academy

== Notable people ==
- Matt Joyce, professional baseball outfielder, raised in Seffner
- Andrew W.K., musician, lived in Seffner in 1999

== See also ==
- Mango-Seffner, Florida, a single census area recorded during the 1980 census
