= Brandon Exchange =

Shopping mall in Brandon, Florida

Coordinates: 27.9333°N 82.3264°W

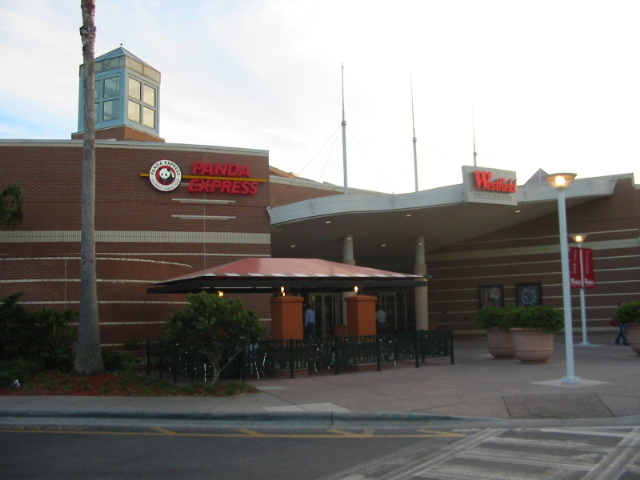
- The main entrance of Brandon Exchange, then known as Westfield Brandon, 2006
- Location: Brandon, Florida, United States
- Address: 459 Brandon Town Center, Brandon, FL 33511
- Opened: 1995; 31 years ago
- Previous names: Brandon Town Center (1995–2002); Westfield Shoppingtown Brandon (2002–2005); Westfield Brandon (2005–2023); Brandon Mall (2023–2024)
- Developer: Urban Shopping Centers
- Manager: North American Development Group
- Owner: North American Development Group
- Num. of stores: 143
- Num. of anchor tenants: 7 (6 open, 1 under construction)
- Floor area: 1,100,000 sq ft (100,000 m^{2})
- Floors: 1 (2 in Dillard's, JCPenney, and Macy's)
- Website: https://brandonexchange.com/

Brandon Exchange (formerly Brandon Town Center, Westfield Shoppingtown Brandon, Westfield Brandon, and Brandon Mall) is a shopping mall located eight miles (13 km) east of Tampa, Florida, in the suburban community of Brandon. The mall is owned by North American Development Group (U.S. Headquarters in West Palm Beach, FL). Brandon Exchange is located directly off Interstate 75, sitting on land between State Road 60 and the Lee Roy Selmon Expressway.

== History ==
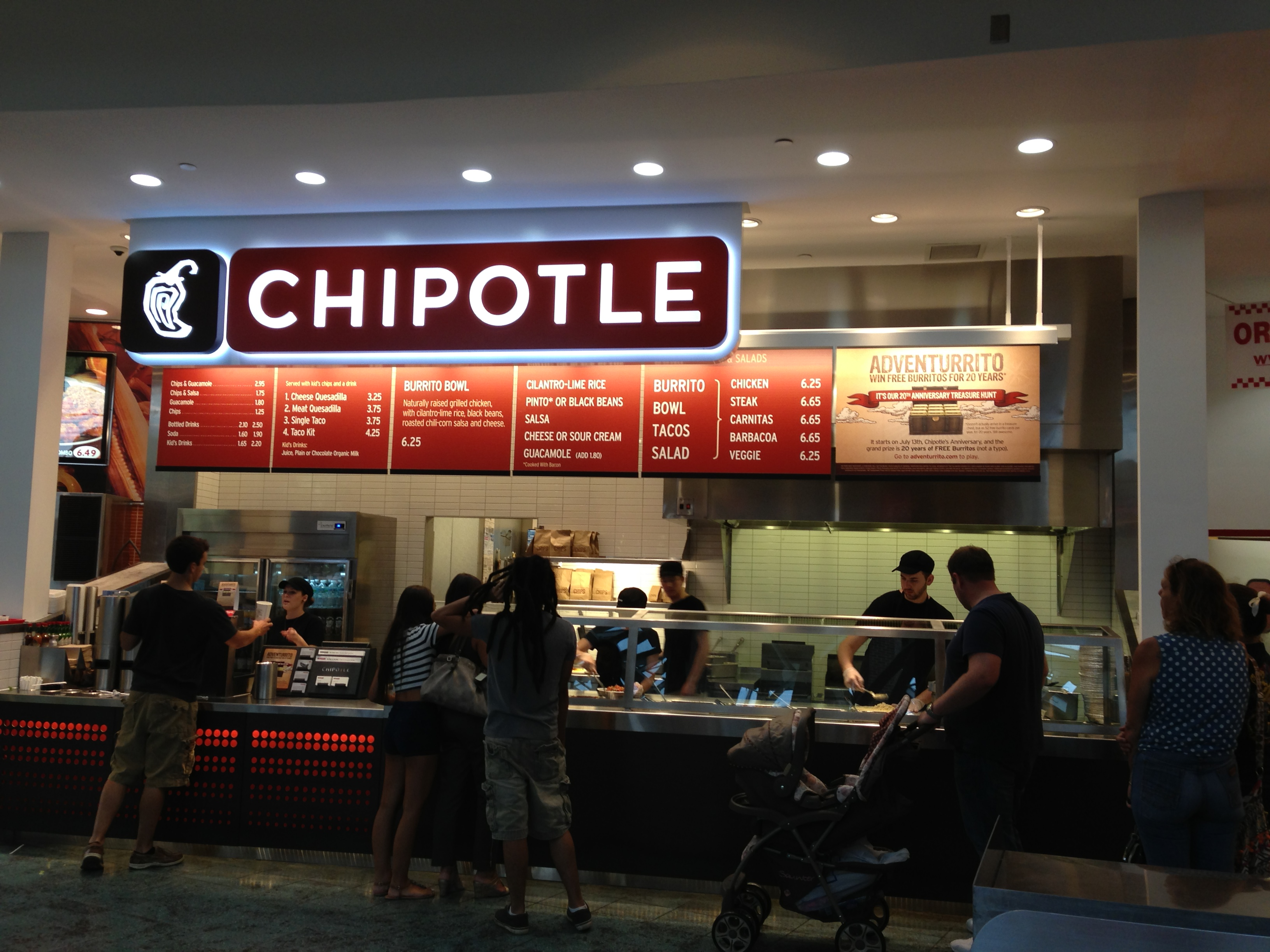
Chipotle in Brandon Exchange

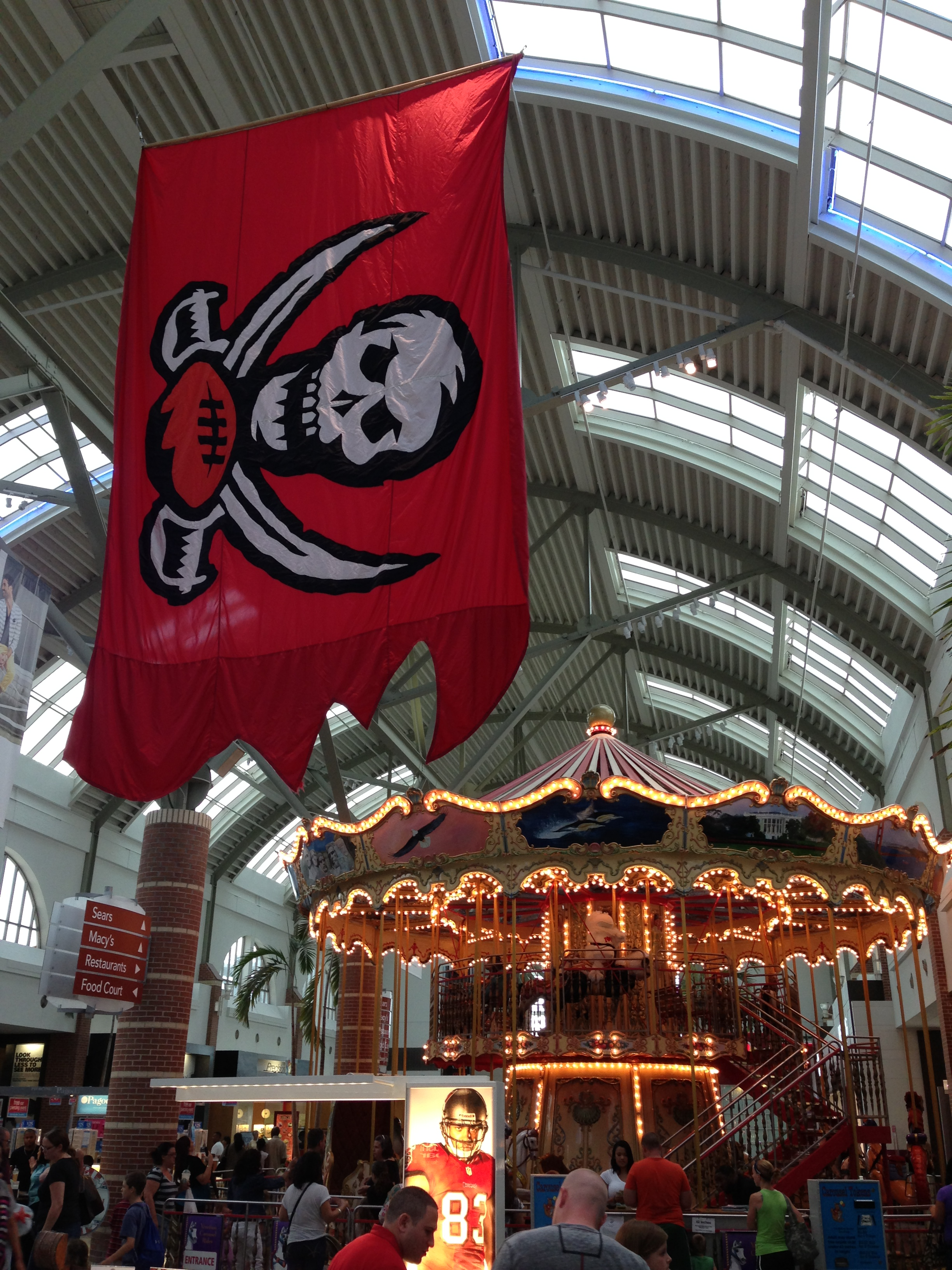
The Buccaneers Flag is seen along with the Carousel in Brandon Exchange.

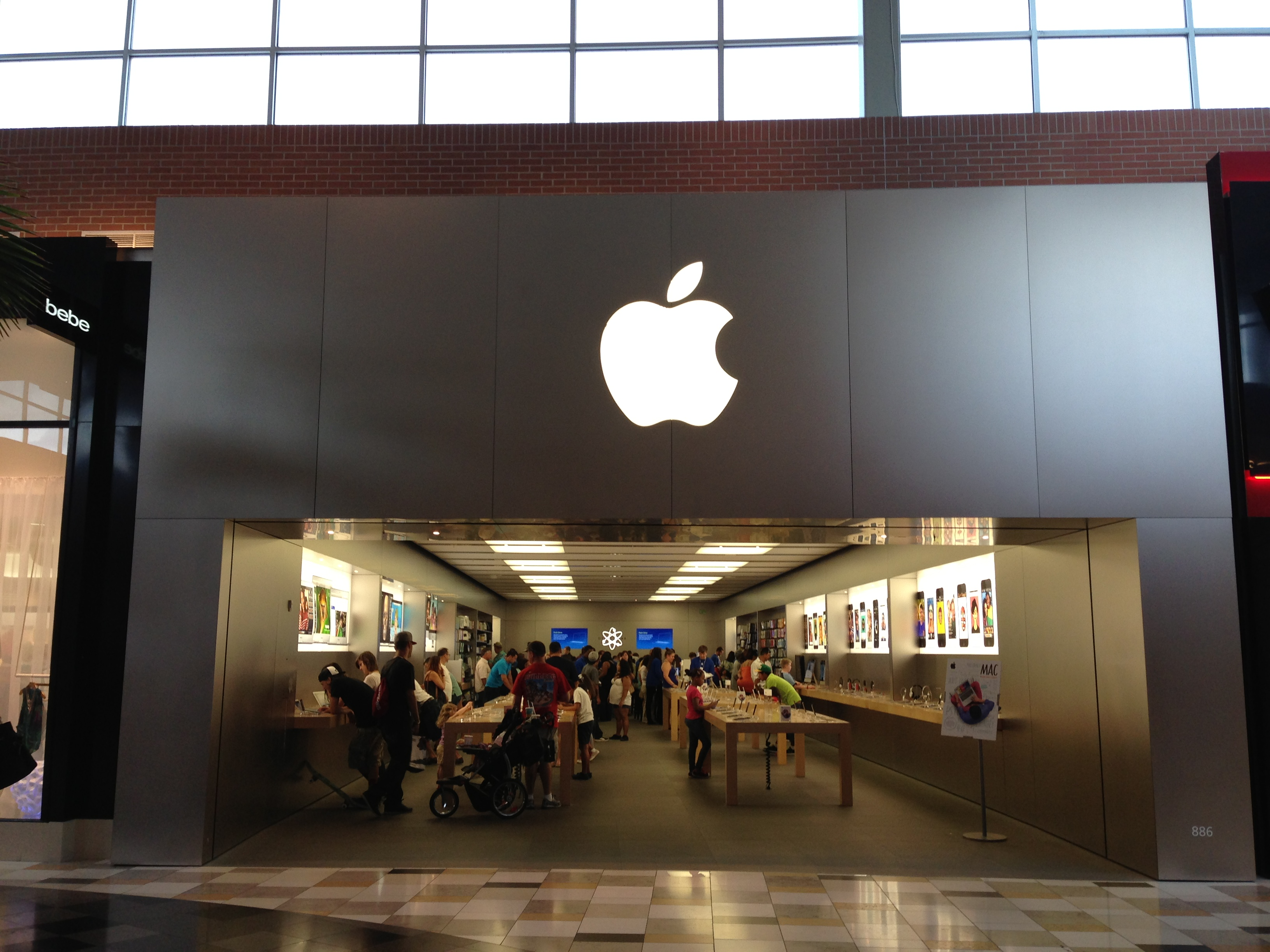
Apple Store at Brandon Exchange

The mall was first conceived in the late 1980s, and originally opened in early 1995 as Brandon Town Center. The mall served a million shoppers in its first seventeen days alone . When it first opened, Brandon Town Center boasted 974,000 square feet (90,500 m^{2}) of retail space. The original anchors were Sears, JCPenney, Burdines and Dillard's. Maas Brothers also signed although it filed for bankruptcy as it was absorbed into Burdines four years before the mall was built.

Prior to Brandon Town Center, Carey Cattle Company owned the land and operated a cattle farm there.

The Westfield Group acquired the Town Center in 2002 and renamed it "Westfield Shoppingtown Brandon" in line with the other Westfield centers. Many of the distinctive fountains featuring metal sculptures of Florida wildlife were demolished in favor of vendor kiosks in the months following the transition. Currently, 986,000 square feet (91,600 m^{2}) of space is given to retail shops and restaurants.

In March 2005, the Burdines was renamed Macy's after briefly operating as Burdines-Macy's. Like all Macy's in Florida that were Burdines, the palm tree columns reminiscent of the "Burdines style" of architecture remained. The "Shoppingtown" was dropped from the name in June 2005.

On January 11, 2006, Westfield announced a 150,000-square-foot (14,000 m^{2}) expansion, which added a Dick's Sporting Goods anchor in addition to more retail outlets and restaurants (including The Cheesecake Factory and Starbucks). It was completed in the spring of 2007. Expanding the mall to include some planned pedestrian-friendly establishments has worried commuters who may have to temporarily find alternate routes to the already-congested State Road 60 and the Lee Roy Selmon Expressway.

The new, expanded wing includes stores such as the Apple Store, Books-A-Million, DSW, Fossil, Sephora, Tillys, Torrid, and The Walking Company.

On January 29, 2021, it was announced that Sears would be closing as part of a plan to close 23 stores nationwide. The store closed on April 18, 2021.

In May 2023, Unibail-Rodamco-Westfield sold Westfield Brandon for $220 million to North American Development Group, a West Palm Beach-based real estate firm. As a result of the sale, the Westfield branding was dropped from the mall's name and was renamed to Brandon Mall.

In late May 2024, Brandon Mall became Brandon Exchange with an updated new website as well as updated branding throughout the property.

On October 31, 2025, Dick's Sporting Goods opened a concept store called Dick's House of Sport in the former Sears location. Dick’s Sporting Goods ultimately moved to this new location and closed its old location.

Later in December 2025, Irish fashion retailer Primark announced that it would open a store in the former Dick’s Sporting Goods location in 2026.

== Anchor stores ==
=== Current anchor stores ===
- Dick's House of Sport (2025–present)
- Dillard's (1995–present) 225,000 ft.²
- JCPenney (1995–present) 150,000 ft.²
- Macy's (opened as Burdines, 1995–2005, renamed Macy's, 2005-present) 146,000 ft.²

=== Former anchor stores ===
- Sears (1995–2021)
- Burdines (1995–2005)
- DSW (2007–2023)
- Dick's Sporting Goods (2007-2025)
