= Pinellas County, Florida =

County in Florida, United States

- County
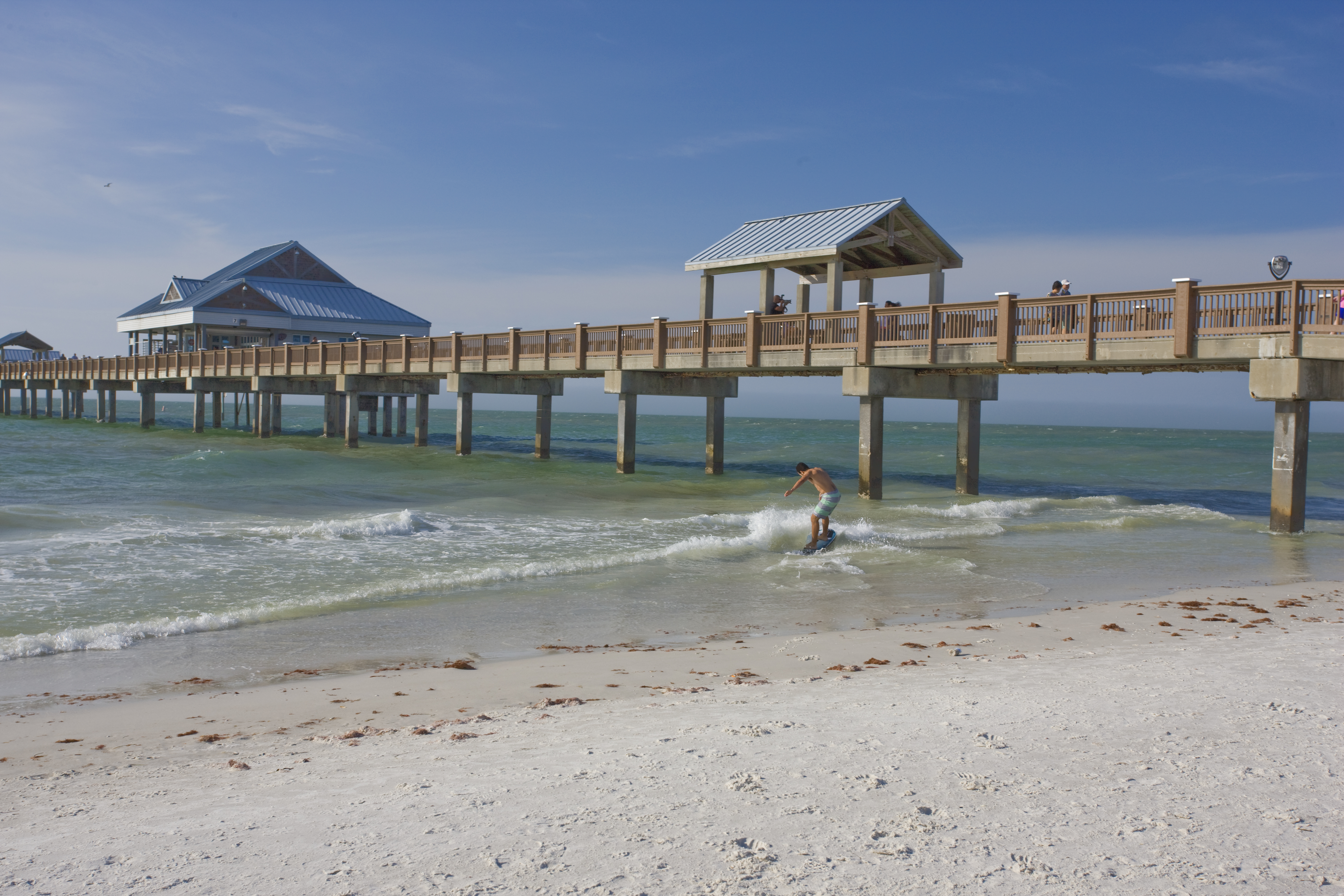
- Clearwater Beach

- Logo

- Location within the U.S. state of Florida
- Coordinates: 27.90°N 82.74°W
- Country: United States
- State: Florida
- Founded: January 1, 1912
- Named for: Spanish Punta Pinal ("Point of Pines")
- Seat: Clearwater
- Largest city: St. Petersburg

Area
  - Total: 608 sq mi (1,570 km^{2})
  - Land: 274 sq mi (710 km^{2})
  - Water: 334 sq mi (870 km^{2}) 55.0%

Population (2020)
  - Total: 959,107
  - Estimate (2025): 948,563 ▼
  - Density: 3,500/sq mi (1,350/km^{2})
- Time zone: UTC−5 (Eastern)
  - Summer (DST): UTC−4 (EDT)
- Congressional districts: 13th, 16th
- Website: www.pinellas.gov

Pinellas County (US: /pɪˈnɛləs/, pih-NEL-əss) is located on the west central coast of the U.S. state of Florida. As of the 2020 census, the population was 959,107, making it the seventh-most populous county in the state. It is also the most densely populated county in Florida, with 1,292 people per square kilometer (3,348 people per square mile). The county is part of the Tampa–St. Petersburg–Clearwater Metropolitan Statistical Area. Clearwater is the county seat. St. Petersburg is the largest city in the county, as well as the largest city in Florida that is not a county seat.

== History ==
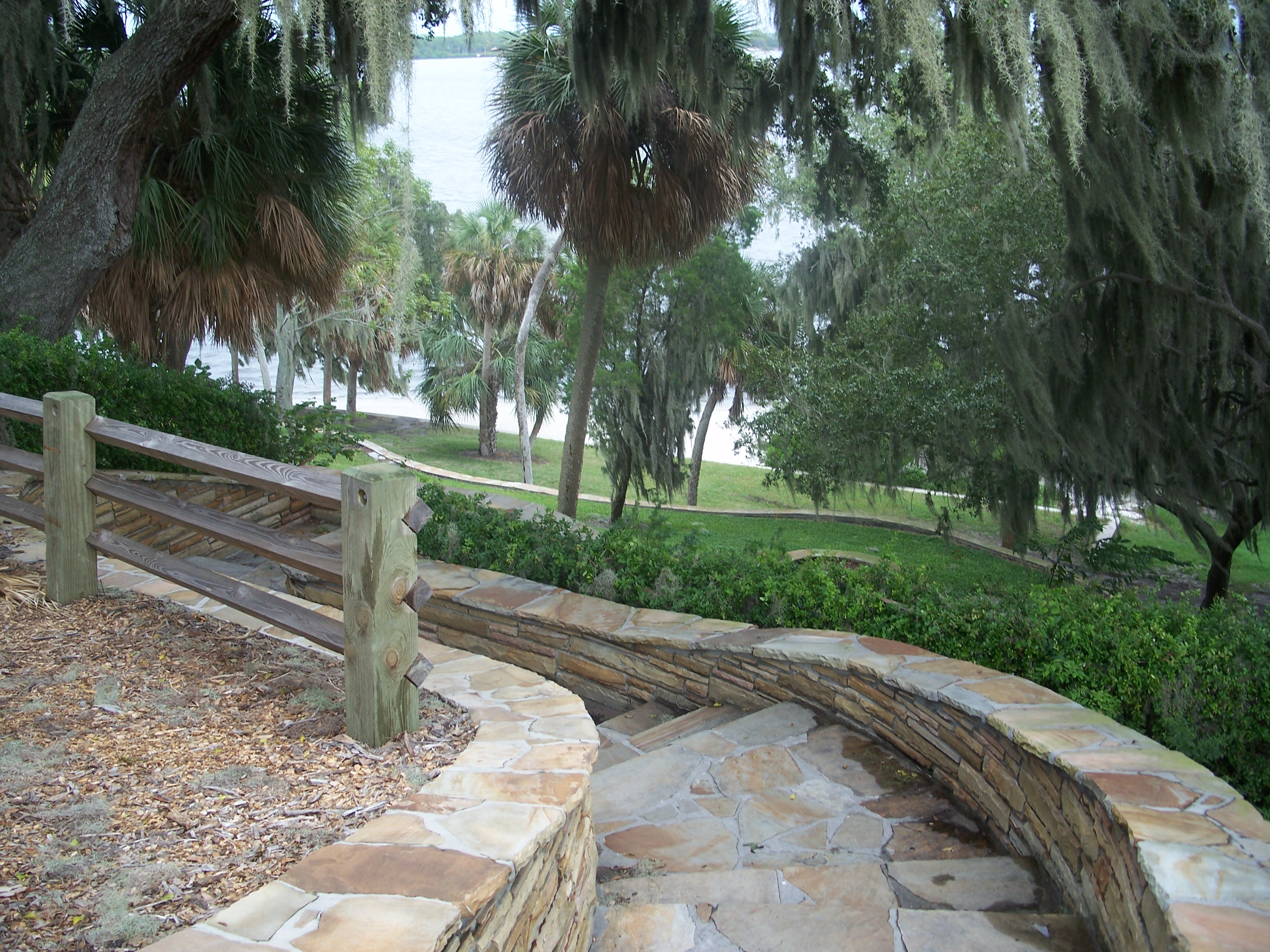
View from the top of the Tocobaga mound at Philippe Park

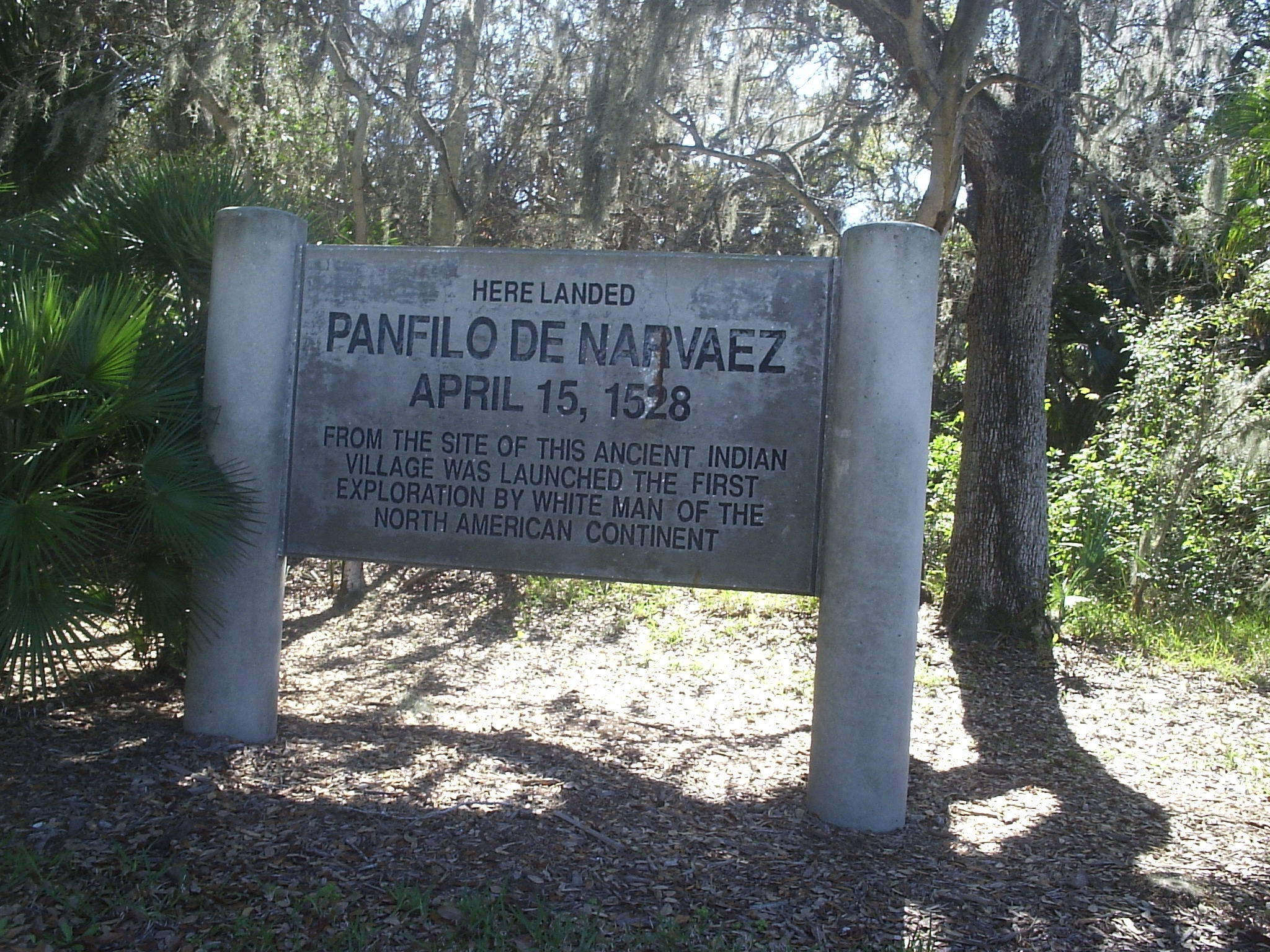
Marker at the site of the 1528 Narvaez landing, Jungle Prada, St. Petersburg

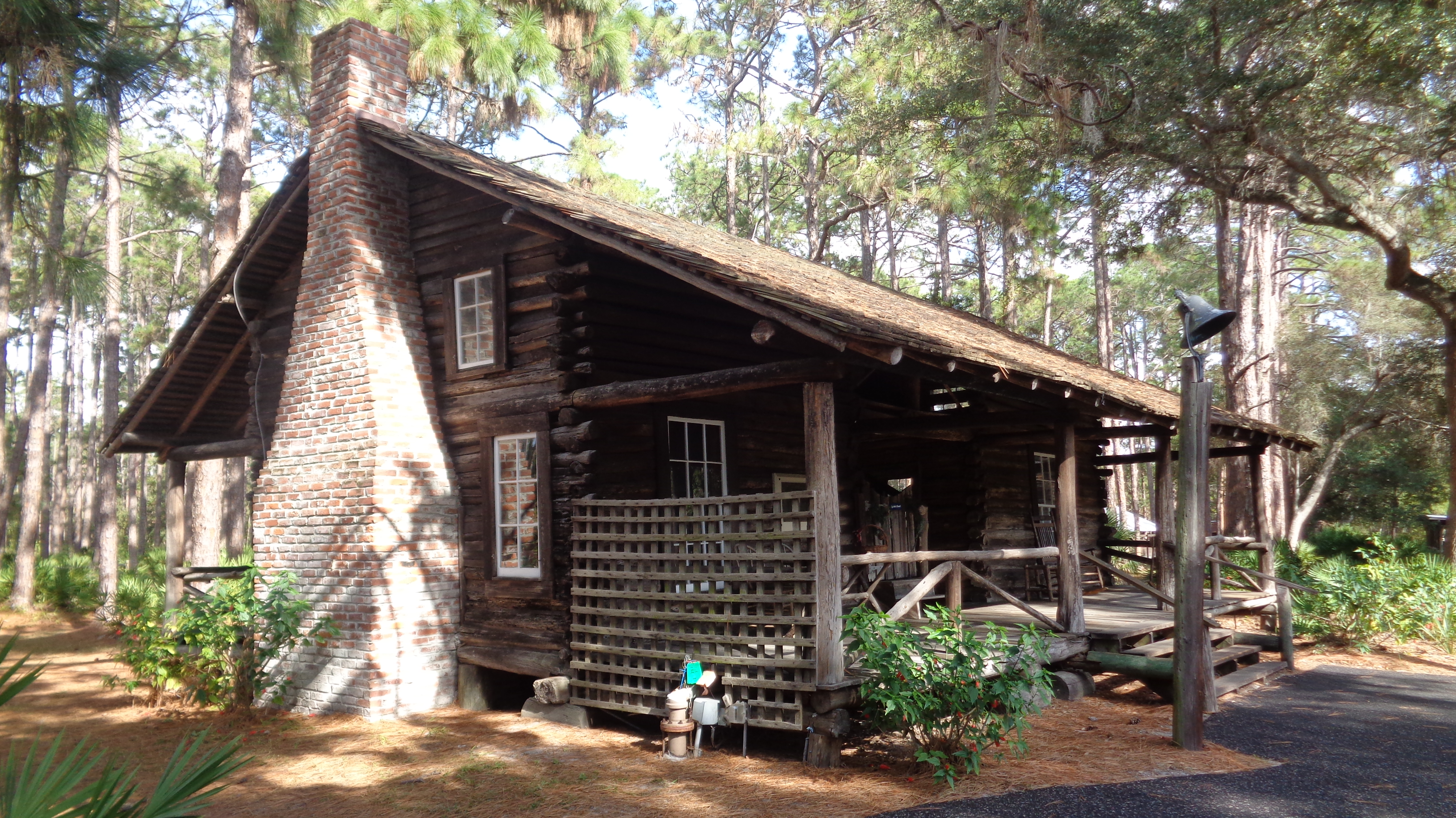
The McMullen-Coachman Log Cabin, built in 1852, is located at Heritage Village in Largo, Florida, and is the oldest standing structure in Pinellas County

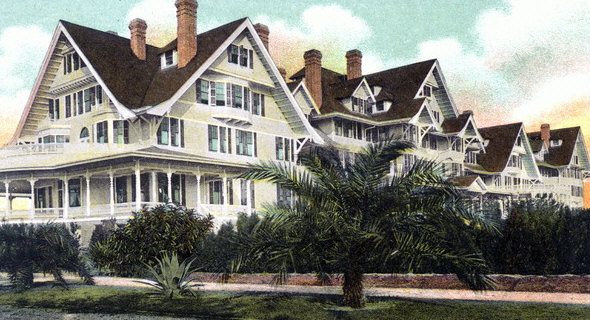
The Belleview-Biltmore Hotel built by Henry Plant

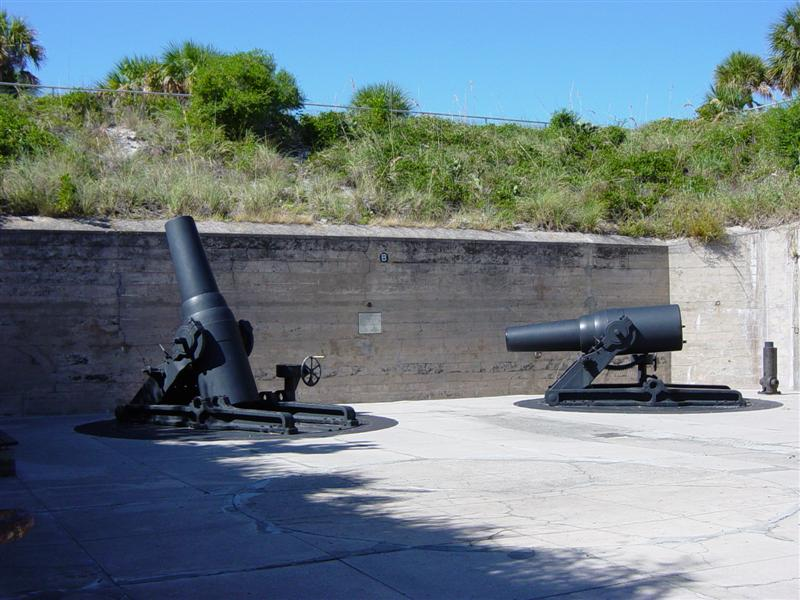
Battery and guns at Fort De Soto

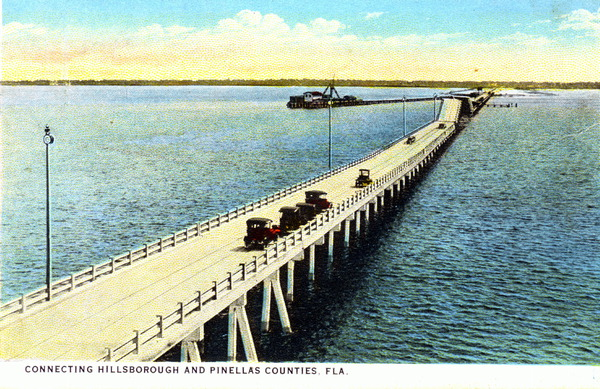
The original span of the Gandy Bridge

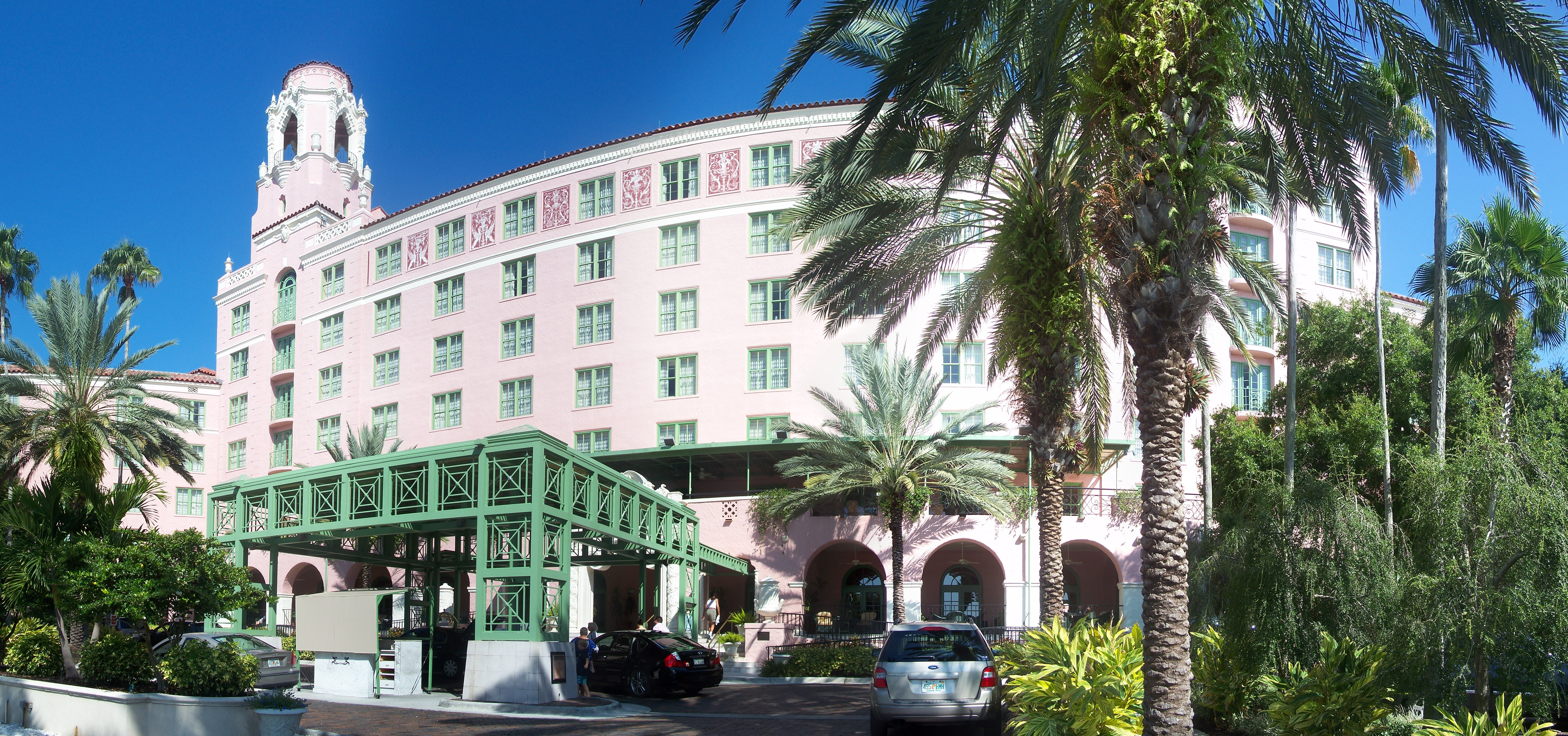
The Renaissance Vinoy Hotel

=== Pre-European settlement ===
The first evidence of human habitation in what is now Pinellas County comes from Weedon Island. Various stone tools dated to the Middle Archaic Period (5000-3000 BCE) have been found on the island.

When Europeans first reached the Pinellas peninsula, the Tampa Bay area was inhabited by people of the Safety Harbor culture. The Safety Harbor culture area was divided into chiefdoms. One documented chiefdom in what is now Pinellas County was that of the Tocobaga, who occupied a town and large temple mound, the Safety Harbor site, overlooking Safety Harbor in what is now the eponymous town of Safety Harbor.

=== Spanish and British Florida ===
During the early 16th century Spanish explorers discovered and slowly began exploring Florida, including Tampa Bay. In 1528 Pánfilo de Narváez landed in Pinellas, and 10 years later Hernando de Soto is thought to have explored the Tampa Bay area. By the early 18th century the Tocobaga had been virtually annihilated, having fallen victim to European diseases from which they had no immunity, as well as European conflicts. Later Spanish explorers named the area Punta Pinal (Spanish for "Point of Pines" or "Piney Point"). After trading hands multiple times between the British and the Spanish, Spain finally ceded Florida to the United States in 1821, and in 1823 the U.S. Army established Fort Brooke (later Tampa).

=== Settlement of West Hillsborough ===
In 1834 much of west central Florida, including the Pinellas peninsula (then known simply as West Hillsborough), was organized as Hillsborough County. The very next year Odet Philippe, a French Huguenot from Charleston, South Carolina became the first permanent, non-native resident of the peninsula when he established a plantation near the site of the Tocobaga village in Safety Harbor. It was Philippe who first introduced both citrus culture and cigar-making to Florida.

Around the same time, the United States Army began construction of Fort Harrison, named after William Henry Harrison, as a rest post for soldiers from nearby Fort Brooke during the Second Seminole War. The new fort was located on a bluff overlooking Clear Water Harbor, which later became part of an early 20th-century residential development (now historic district) called Harbor Oaks. University of South Florida archaeologists excavated the site in 1977 after Alfred C. Wyllie discovered an underground ammunition bunker while digging a swimming pool on his estate. Clearwater would later become the first organized community on the peninsula as well as the site of its first post office.

The Armed Occupation Act, passed in 1842, encouraged further settlement of Pinellas, like all of Florida, by offering 160 acres (0.65 km^{2}) to anyone who would bear arms and cultivate the land. Pioneer families like the Booths, the Coachmans, the Marstons, and the McMullens established homesteads in the area in the years following, planting more citrus groves and raising cattle. During the American Civil War, many residents fought for the Confederate States of America. Brothers James and Daniel McMullen were members of the Confederate Cow Cavalry, driving Florida cattle to Georgia and the Carolinas to help sustain the war effort. John W. Marston served in the 9th Florida Regiment as a part of the Appomattox Campaign. Many other residents served in other capacities. Otherwise the peninsula had virtually no significance during the war, and the war largely passed the area by.

On September 27, 1848, a strong hurricane struck the West Coast of Florida. It separated the barrier island on the coast and created a waterway known today as John's Pass. John Levique, along with Joseph Silva, was the one who discovered it and named it after himself and is now a federally owned canal.

Tarpon Springs became West Hillsborough's first incorporated city in 1887, and in 1888 the Orange Belt Railway was extended into the southern portion of the peninsula. Railroad owner Peter Demens named the town that grew near the railroad's terminus St. Petersburg in honor of his hometown. The town would incorporate in 1892. Other major towns in the county incorporated during this time were Clearwater (1891), Dunedin (1899), and Largo (1905).

Construction of Fort De Soto, on Mullet Key facing the mouth of Tampa Bay, was begun in 1898 during the Spanish–American War to protect Tampa Bay from potential invading forces. The fort, a subpost of Fort Dade on adjacent Egmont Key (which lies in the mouth of Tampa Bay), was equipped with artillery and mortar batteries.

=== Birth of Pinellas County ===
Even into the early years of the 20th century, West Hillsborough had no paved roads, and transportation posed a major challenge. A trip to the county seat, across the bay in Tampa, was generally an overnight affair and the automobiles that existed on the peninsula at that time would frequently become bogged down in the muck after rainstorms. Angry at what was perceived as neglect by the county government, residents of Pinellas began a push to secede from Hillsborough. They succeeded, and on January 1, 1912, Pinellas County came into being. The peninsula, along with a small part of the mainland were incorporated into the new county.

=== Land boom and prohibition ===
Aviation history was made in St. Petersburg on January 1, 1914, when Tony Jannus made the world's first scheduled commercial airline flight with the St. Petersburg–Tampa Airboat Line from St. Petersburg to Tampa. The popular open-air St. Petersburg concert venue Jannus Live (formerly known as Jannus Landing) memorializes the flight.

The early 1920s saw the beginning of a land boom in much of Florida, including Pinellas. During this period municipalities issued a large number of bonds to keep pace with the needed infrastructure, such as roads and bridges. The travel time to Tampa was cut in half—from 43 to 19 miles (69 to 31 km)—by the opening of the Gandy Bridge in 1924, along the same route Jannus' airline used. It was the longest automobile toll bridge in the world at the time.

Prohibition was unpopular in the area and the peninsula's inlets and islands were used by rum-runners bringing in liquor from Cuba. Others distilled moonshine in the county's still plentiful woods.

=== Great Depression and World War II ===
As was the case in much of Florida, the Great Depression came early to Pinellas with the collapse of the real estate boom in 1926. Local economies came into severe difficulties, and by 1930, St. Petersburg defaulted on its bonds. Only after World War II would significant growth return to the area. During the war, the area's tourist industry collapsed, but thousands of recruits came to the area when the U.S. military decided to use the area for training. Area hotels became barracks. The Vinoy Park Hotel was used as an Army training school. The area's women and girls participated in the war effort as well. Hundreds of girls from the area's most prominent families formed a group called the Bomb-a-Dears, holding dances, socializing with recruits, and selling war bonds. After the war many of these same soldiers remembered their wartime experience in Pinellas well, and returned as tourists or residents.

=== Recent history ===
With the end of the Second World War, Pinellas would enter another period of rapid growth and development. In 1954 the original span of the Sunshine Skyway Bridge was opened, replacing earlier ferry service. By 1957 Clearwater was America's fastest growing city.

Tragedy struck on May 9, 1980, when the southbound span of the original Sunshine Skyway Bridge was struck by the freighter MV Summit Venture during a storm, sending over 1,200 feet (370 m) of the bridge plummeting into Tampa Bay. The collision caused seven personal vehicles and a Greyhound bus to fall 150 feet (46 m) into the water, killing 35 people. The new bridge opened in 1987 and has since been listed as number 3 of the "Top 10 Bridges" in the World by the Travel Channel.

The county operates a 21-acre (8.5 ha) living history museum called Heritage Village containing more than 28 historic structures, some dating back to the 19th century, where visitors can experience what life was once like in Pinellas.

== Geography ==
According to the U.S. Census Bureau, the county has a total area of 608 square miles (1,570 km^{2}), of which 274 square miles (710 km^{2}) is land and 334 square miles (870 km^{2}) (55.0%) is water. It is the second-smallest county in Florida by land area, larger than only Union County. Pinellas forms a peninsula bounded on the west by the Gulf of Mexico and on the south and east by Tampa Bay. It is 38 miles (61 km) long and 15 miles (24 km) wide at its broadest point, with 587 miles (945 km) of coastline.

=== Physical geography ===
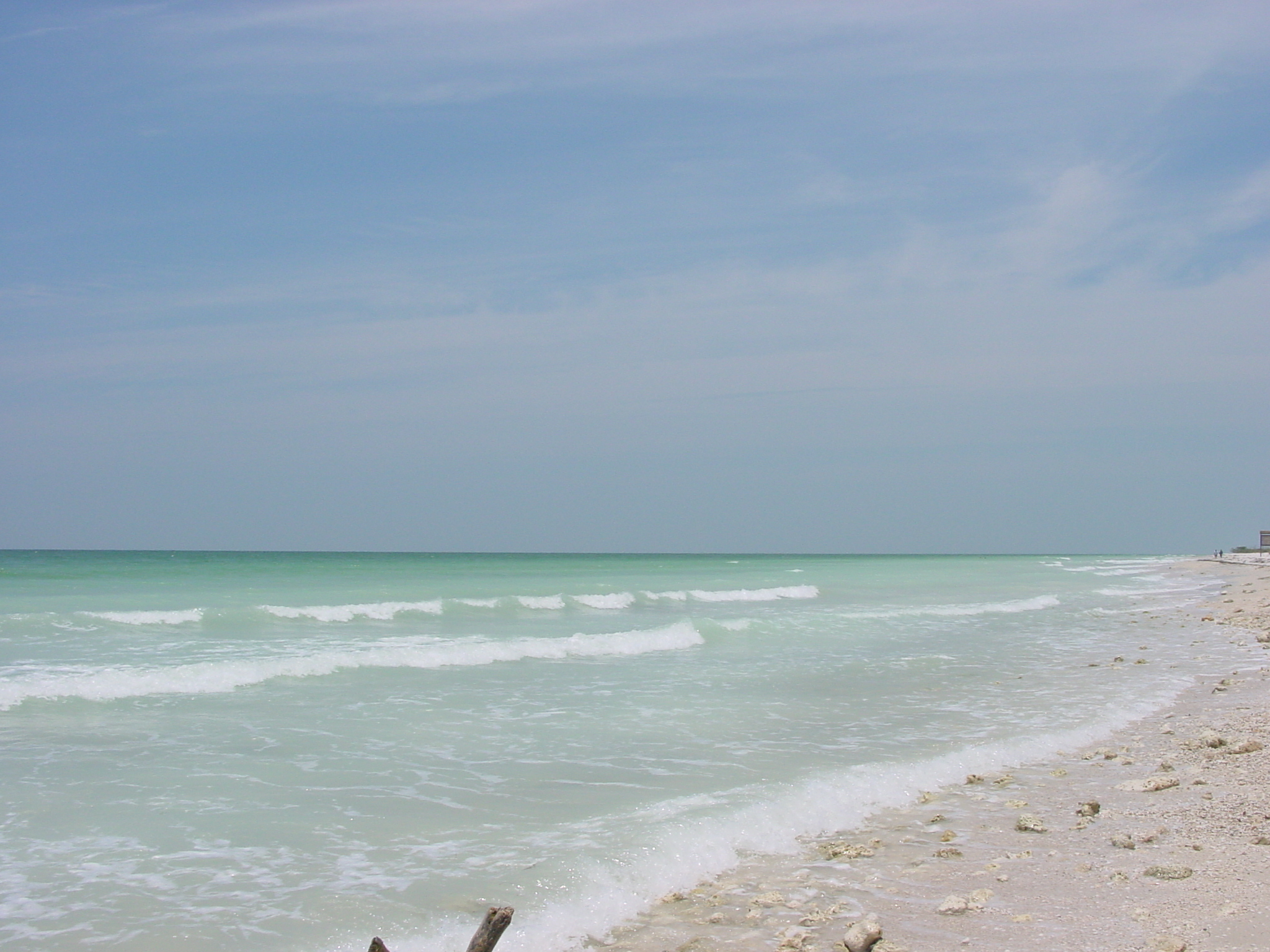
Honeymoon Island State Park near Dunedin, one of the county's barrier islands

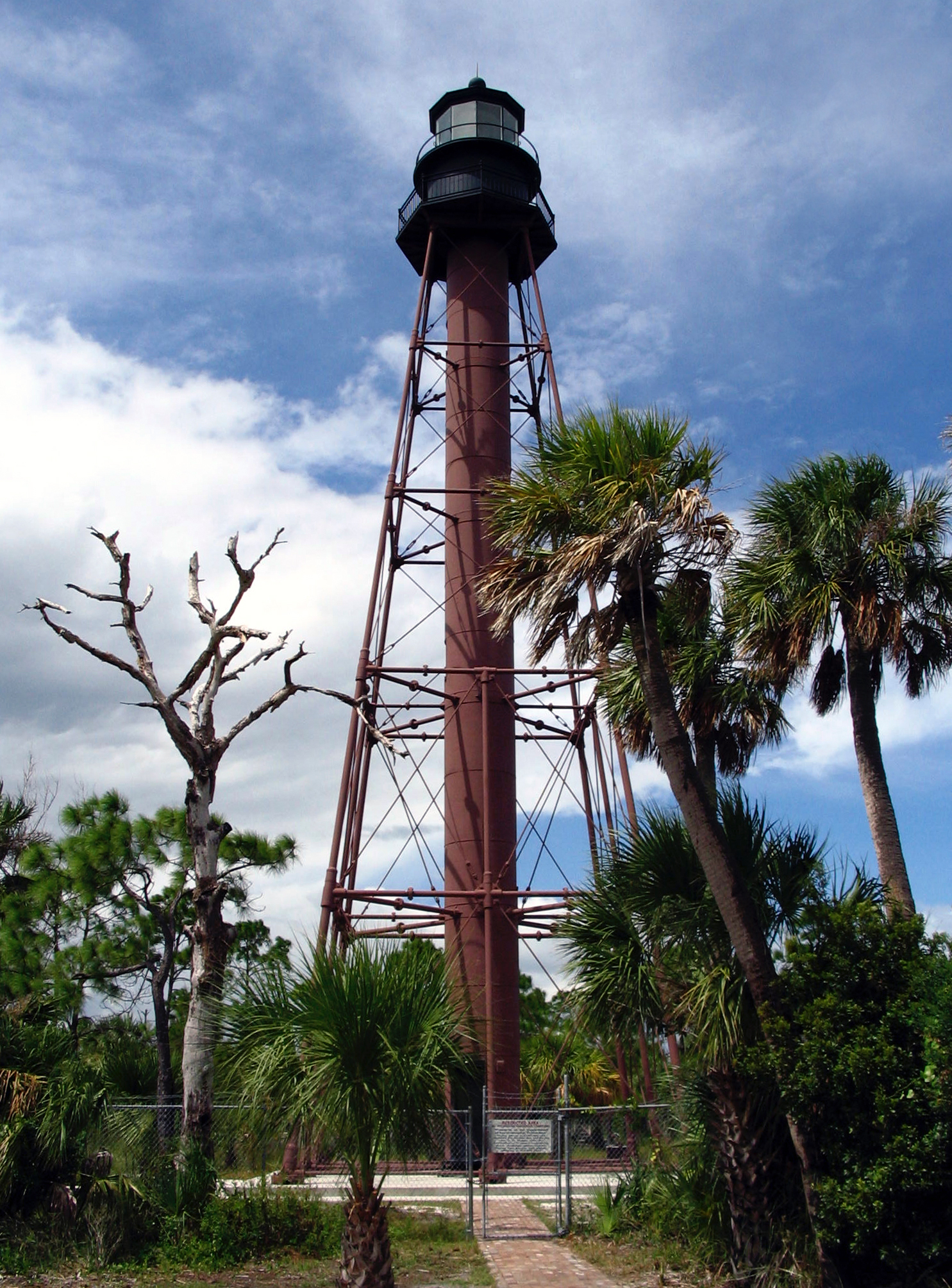
The Anclote Key Light

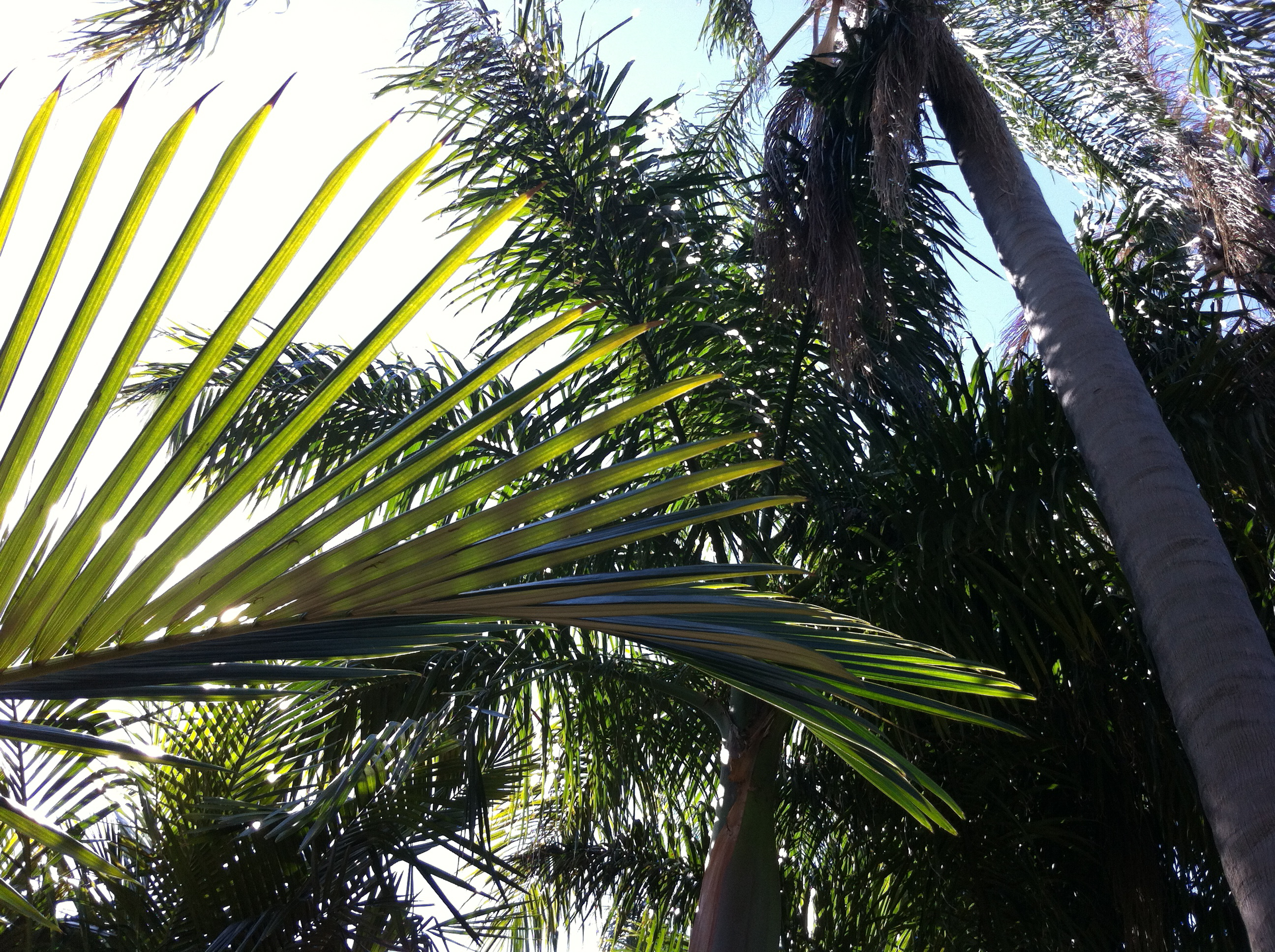
Gizella Kopsick Palm Arboretum in St. Petersburg

Elevation in the county ranges from mean sea level to its highest natural point of 110 feet (34 m) near the intersection of SR 580 and Countryside Blvd. in Clearwater. Due to its small size and high population, by the early 21st century Pinellas County has been mostly built out, with very little developable land left available. The county has maintained a fairly large system of parks and preserves that provide residents and visitors retreat from the city and a glimpse of the peninsula's original state.

Geologically, Pinellas is underlain by a series of limestone formations, the Hawthorne limestone and the Tampa limestone. The limestone is porous and stores a large quantity of water. The Hawthorne formation forms a prominent ridge down the spine of the county, from east of Dunedin, south to the Walsingham area and east towards St. Petersburg.

The 35 miles of beaches and dunes which make up the county's 11 barrier islands provide habitat for coastal species, serve as critical storm protection for the inland communities, and form the basis of the area's thriving tourism industry. The islands are dynamic, with wave action building some islands further up, eroding others, and forming entirely new islands over time. Though hurricanes are infrequent on this part of Florida's coast, they have had a major impact on the islands, with the Hurricane of 1848 forming John's Pass between Madeira Beach and Treasure Island, a hurricane in 1921 creating Hurricane Pass and cleaving Hog Island into Honeymoon and Caladesi Islands, and 1985's Hurricane Elena sealing Dunedin Pass to join Caladesi with Clearwater Beach.

Between the barrier islands and the peninsula are several bodies of water, through which traverses a section of the Gulf Intracoastal Waterway. From north to south they are: St. Joseph Sound between the islands and Dunedin, Clearwater Harbor between Clearwater and Clearwater Beach, and Boca Ciega Bay in the southern third of the county. Connecting Clearwater Harbor to Boca Ciega Bay is a thin, approximately 3.5-mile (5.6 km) stretch of water known as The Narrows, which runs next to the town of Indian Shores.

Extending from northeastern Boca Ciega Bay, Long Bayou separates Seminole from St. Petersburg near Bay Pines. Long Bayou once extended significantly farther up the peninsula until the northern portion was sealed off to create Lake Seminole. Extending further still from Long Bayou, the Cross Bayou Canal traverses the peninsula, crossing Pinellas Park in a northeasterly direction before emptying into Tampa Bay on the northwest side of St. Pete–Clearwater International Airport.

==== Barrier islands and passes ====
- Anclote Key: offshore of Tarpon Springs and the northernmost point in the county
- Howard Park: a man-made pocket beach created in the 1960s
- Three Rooker Bar: the most geologically recent of Pinellas' barrier islands
- Honeymoon Island
- Hurricane Pass
- Caladesi Island
- Dunedin Pass: shoaled and closed in the 1980s, linking Caladesi Island and Clearwater Beach
- Clearwater Beach
- Clearwater Pass
- Sand Key: the longest of Pinellas' barrier islands
- John's Pass
- Treasure Island
- Blind Pass
- Long Key (St. Pete Beach)
- Pass-a-Grille Channel
- Shell Key
- Tierra Verde: on the bay side of Shell Key, links the mainland to Fort De Soto. Created by a dredge-and-fill project that merged several smaller Keys, including Cabbage and Pine Keys
- Bunces Pass
- Mullet Key: home to Fort De Soto and the southernmost point in the county

=== National protected area ===
- Pinellas National Wildlife Refuge

=== State protected areas ===
- Honeymoon Island State Park
- Caladesi Island State Park
- Anclote Key Preserve State Park

=== County parks and preserves ===
- A.L. Anderson Park, Tarpon Springs
- Boca Ciega Millenium Park, Seminole
- John Chesnut Sr. Park, Palm Harbor
- Eagle Lake Park, Largo
- Fort De Soto Park, Tierra Verde
- Fred Howard Park, Tarpon Springs
- Lake Seminole Park, Seminole
- Philippe Park, Safety Harbor
- Ridgecrest Park, Largo
- Sand Key Park, Clearwater
- Sawgrass Lake Park, St. Petersburg
- John S. Taylor Park, Largo
- Wall Springs Park, Palm Harbor
- Walsingham Park, Largo
- War Veterans Memorial Park, St. Petersburg
- Brooker Creek Preserve
- Mobbly Bayou Preserve
- Shell Key Preserve
- Weedon Island Preserve

=== Pinellas County parks gallery ===
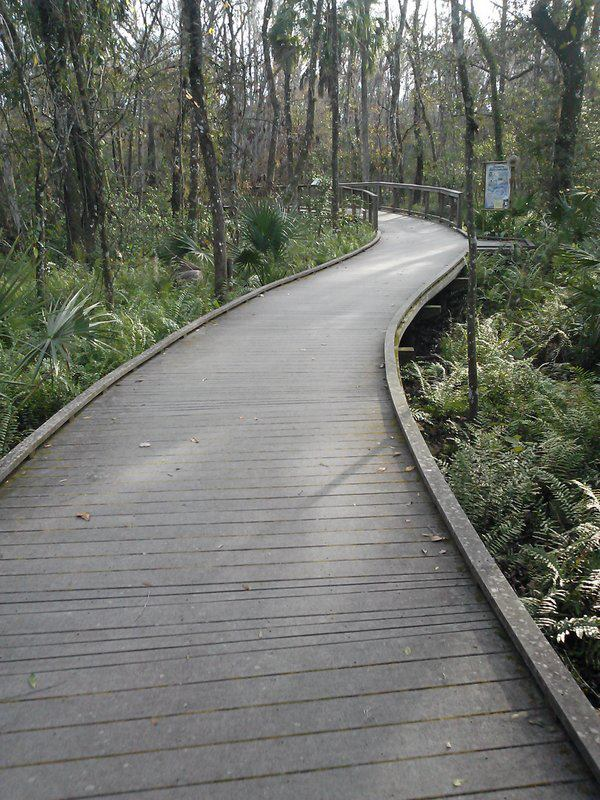
Brooker Creek Nature Preserve walkway

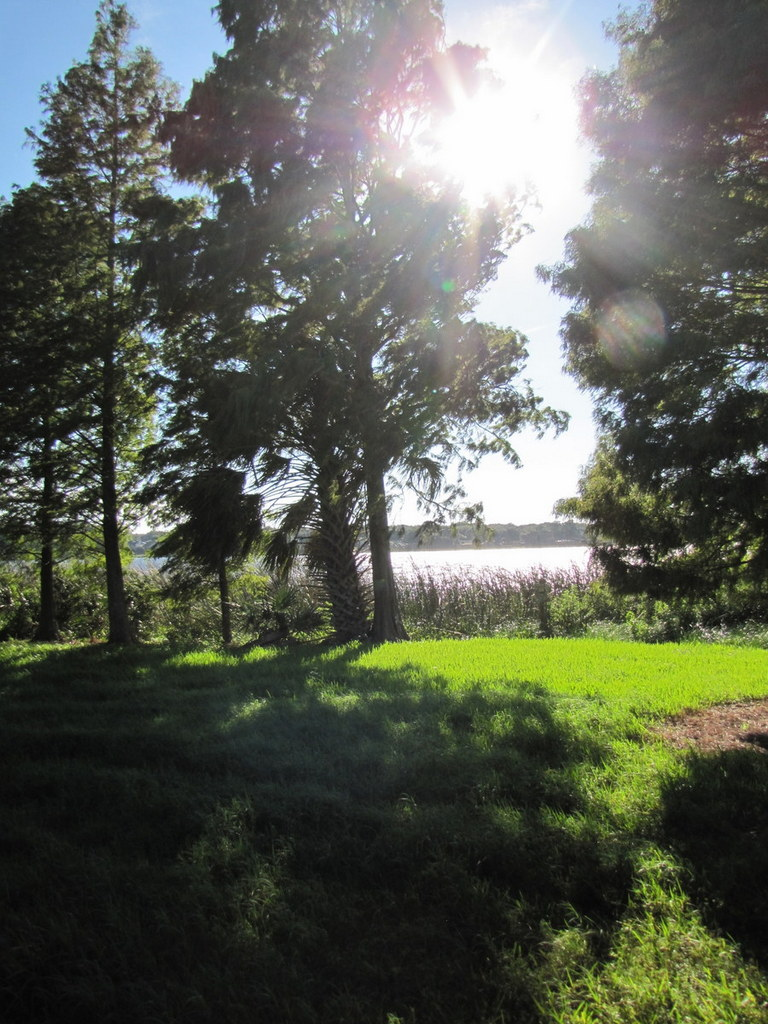
View of Lake Tarpon from John Chestnut Park

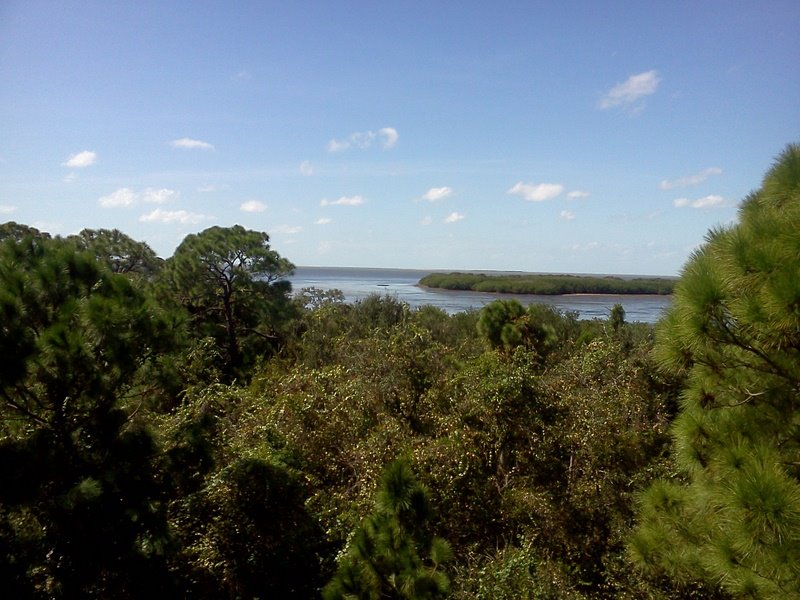
Wall Springs View of St Joseph Sound from the old observation tower

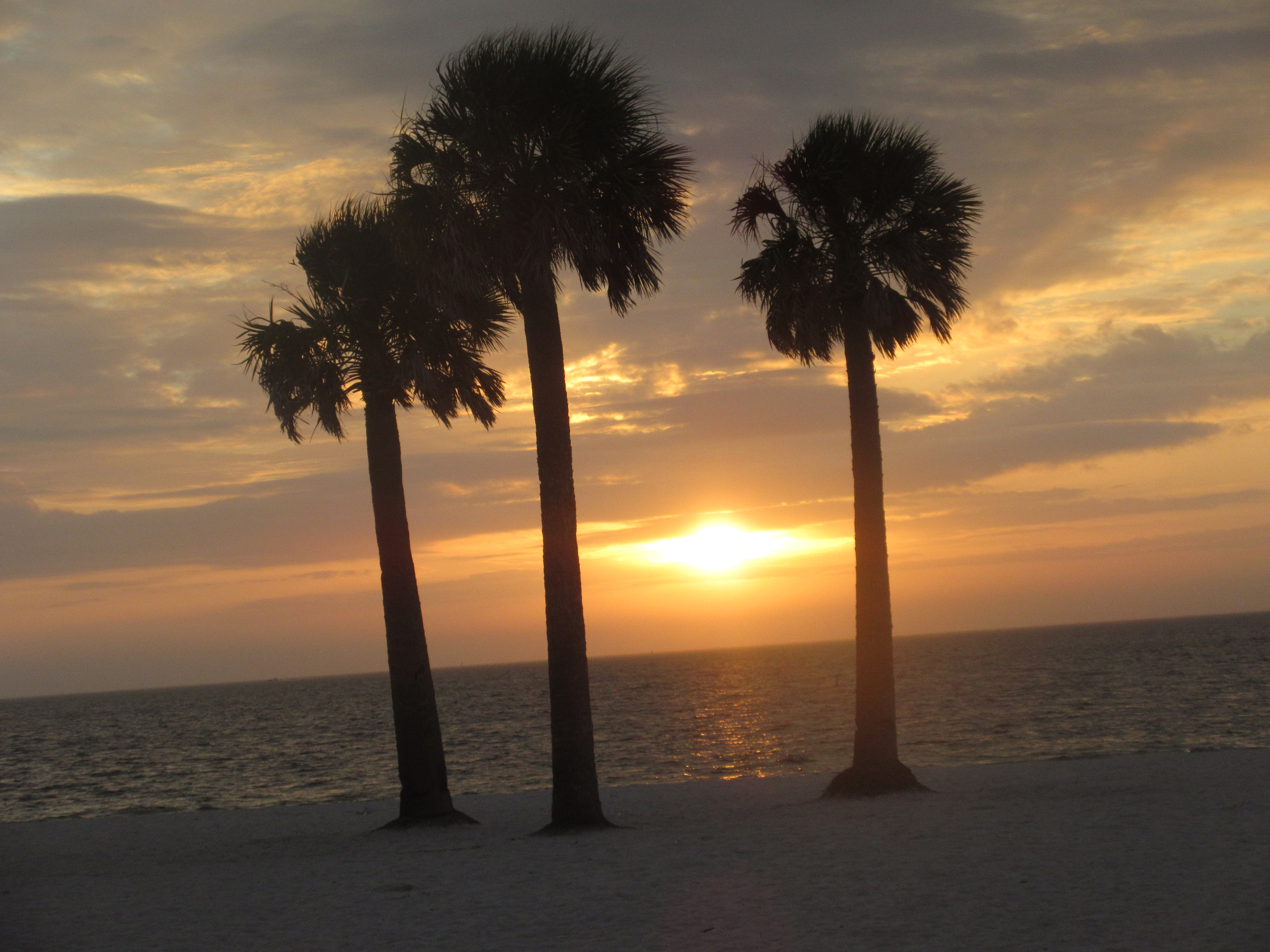
Sunset at Fred Howard Park
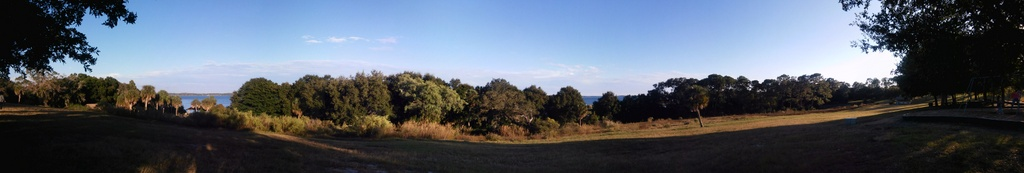
Anderson Park Panorama

=== Other protected areas ===
Boyd Hill Nature Preserve: A 245-acre (99 ha) park on the shores of Lake Maggiore in south St. Petersburg, operated by the city and featuring a nature center, bird-of-prey aviary, and over three miles of trails through a variety of ecosystems.

=== Adjacent counties ===
- Pasco County—north
- Hillsborough County—east and south

Hillsborough County extends along the shipping channel towards Egmont Key and into the Gulf of Mexico, separating Pinellas County from Manatee County.

== Ecosystems ==
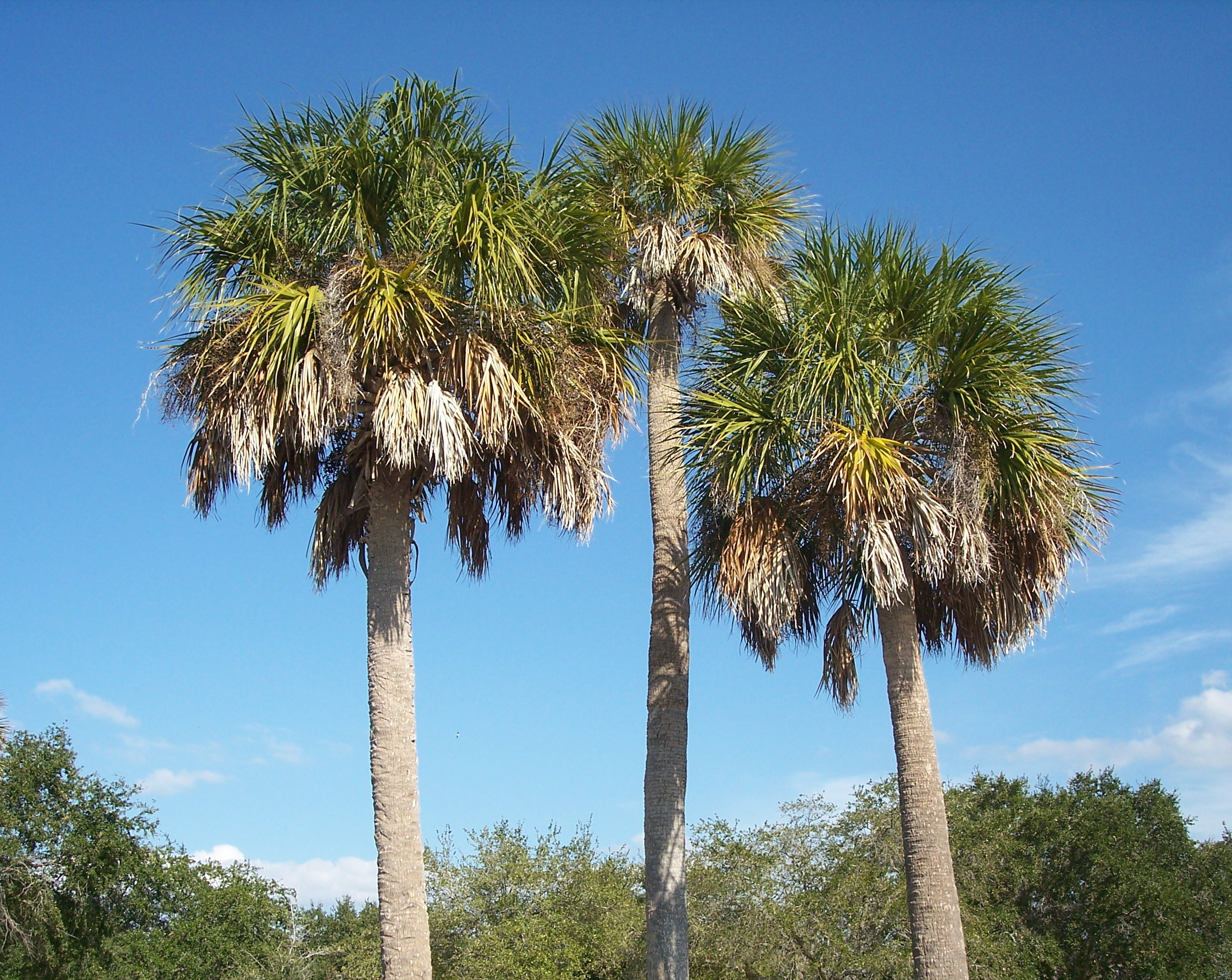
Cabbage palms, the state tree of Florida

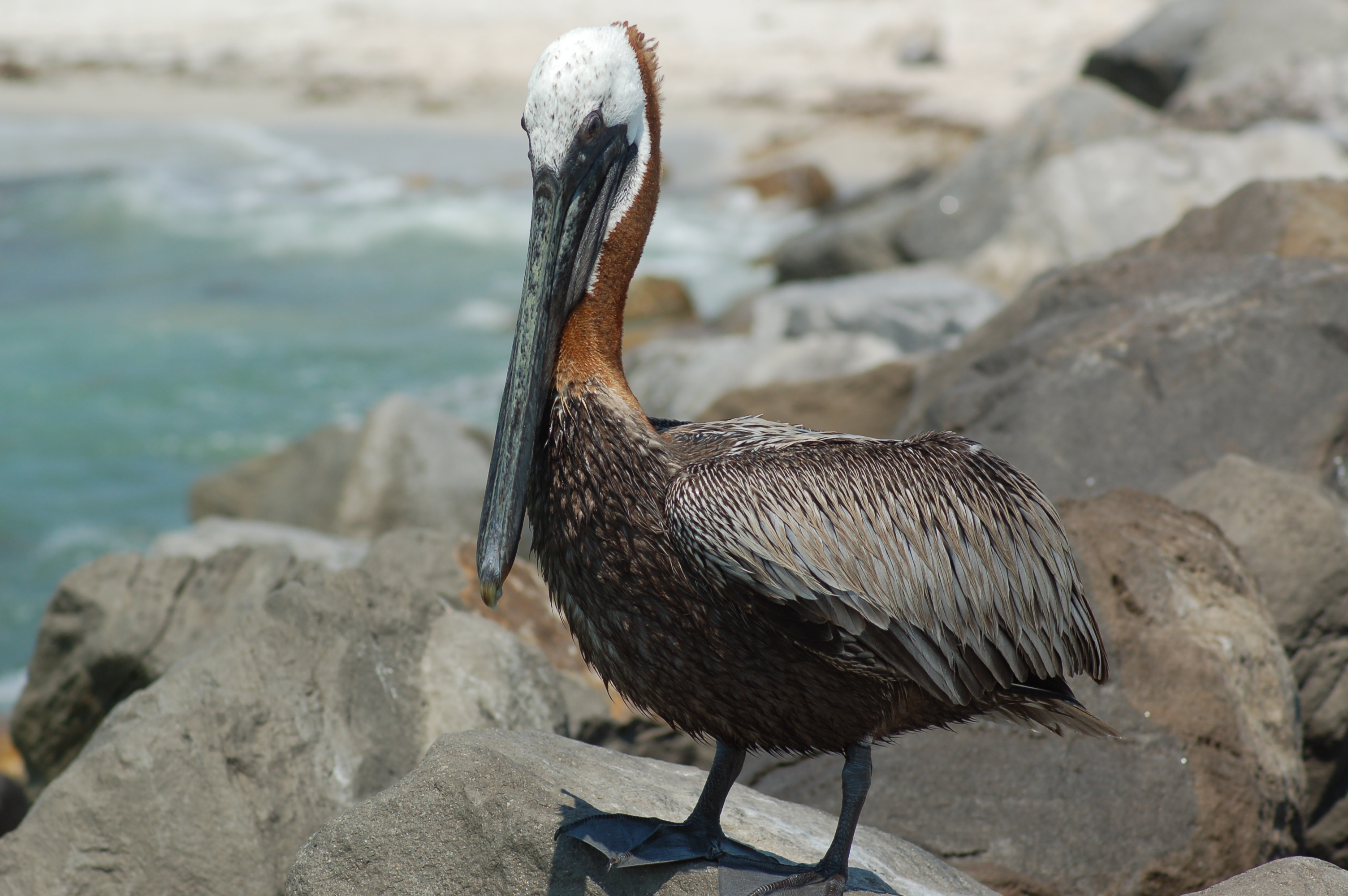
The brown pelican is commonly seen along the Gulf coast

=== Plant life ===
Several natural communities exist within the county, including areas of freshwater wetlands (dominated by bald cypresses and ferns), coastal mangrove swamps, sporadic hardwood hammocks (dominated by laurel oaks and live oaks, cabbage palms, and southern magnolias), low-lying, poorly drained pine flatwoods (dominated by longleaf pines and saw palmettos), and well-drained, upland sandhills (dominated by longleaf pines and turkey oaks) and sand pine scrub (dominated by sand pines, saw palmettos, and various oaks). Offshore ecosystems include the Tampa Bay estuary and numerous gulf seagrass beds. The county also maintains several artificial reefs.

=== Animal life ===
Numerous bird species can be sighted in Pinellas, either as permanent residents or during the winter migration, including wading birds like great blue herons, egrets, white ibises and roseate spoonbills, aquatic birds like brown pelicans, white pelicans, and cormorants, numerous species of shorebirds, and very-common birds like seagulls and passerines like the blue jay, mockingbird, and crow. Ospreys are a commonly seen bird-of-prey, with other birds of prey like turkey vultures, red tailed hawks, great horned owls, screech owls, barn owls, and bald eagles, among others, seen as well.

Gopher tortoises are found in many areas, the burrows they dig making them a keystone species. Coyotes, though often associated with the American West, are native-to and can be found in Pinellas. White-tailed deer, wild turkeys, bobcats, otters, and alligators can be found in the county as well.

Sea turtles nest on the shores or Pinellas' barrier islands and have been threatened by development. Offshore, dolphins, sharks, and manatees are numerous as well, while closer inshore stingrays are a common sight, leading those in-the-know to do the "stingray shuffle" (shuffling up the sand to scare nearby stingrays off) when entering gulf waters. Species of fish commonly caught in the waters surrounding the county include spotted seatrout, red drum or redfish, snook, pompano, sheepshead, Spanish mackerel, grouper, mullet, flounder, kingfish, and tarpon.

=== Invasive species ===
Like much of Florida, Pinellas County is home to several invasive species that propagate easily outside their (and their natural predators') native range. Examples of commonly seen invasives include Brazilian pepper, water hyacinth, Australian pine, melaleuca and air potato. These species are considered serious pests, and varying methods have been tried to eradicate them. Examples of invasive animals include the wild boar, which poses significant health and agricultural problems in Florida and can sometimes be found in Pinellas, and the monk parakeet, small flocks of which can sometimes be seen in flight or building nests on electrical poles or telecommunications towers. There is also a large flock of feral peacocks residing in St. Petersburg's Jungle Terrace, Jungle Prada and Disston Heights neighborhoods.

Pinellas gained some national attention as the home of the Mystery Monkey of Tampa Bay, a non-native, feral rhesus macaque that had been on the loose for approximately three years in the south of the county. No one was sure where the monkey came from, and a Facebook page set up for the monkey had over 84,000 likes (as of October 2012). The monkey was the subject of a sketch on the March 11, 2010, episode of the Colbert Report. As of February 2012, the monkey had apparently taken up semi-permanent residence behind a family's home at an undisclosed location in St. Petersburg, according to the Tampa Bay Times. Efforts to capture the monkey were reignited after it reportedly bit a woman living near where it had taken up residence, and the monkey was captured in late October 2012 and eventually was sent to live at Dade City's Wild Things, a 22-acre (8.9 ha) zoo north of Tampa.

== Climate ==
Cumulonimbus clouds like this one are a frequent sight during the rainy season

Pinellas, like the rest of the Tampa Bay area, has a humid subtropical climate, which shares characteristics with a tropical monsoon climate, resulting in warm, humid summers with frequent thunderstorms, and drier winters. Pinellas County's geographic position- lying on a peninsula between Tampa Bay and the Gulf of Mexico introduces large amounts of humidity into the atmosphere and serves to moderate temperatures. The geography of the peninsula also causes some variance in the county's average temperatures. St. Petersburg, further south on the peninsula, tends to have warmer daily average lows (by about 3 degrees) than areas such as Dunedin and Palm Harbor further north, though daily highs are very close. The north of the county also has fewer overall days of rain, but higher total annual precipitation when measured in inches, the county's south being prone to shorter, more frequent thunderstorms especially in the late summer.

Freezing temperatures occur only every 2–3 years, with freezing precipitation occurring extremely rarely. Springs are usually short, mild, and dry, with occasional late-season cold fronts. Summertime weather is very consistent, with highs in the low 90s °F (around 32 °C), lows in the mid-70s °F (around 24 °C), accompanied by high humidity and an almost daily chance of afternoon thundershowers. The area experiences significant rainfall during its summer months (approximately May through October), with nearly two-thirds of annual precipitation falling between the months of June and September. The area is occasionally affected by tropical storms and hurricanes, but has not suffered a direct hit since 1921. Fall, like spring, is usually mild and dry, with the hurricane season extending through November and sometimes affecting the area.

Many portions of south Pinellas, especially near the bay and gulf, have tropical microclimates. Tropical trees such as coconut palms and royal palms and fruit trees like mangoes grow very well in these microclimates.

Climate data for St. Petersburg, Florida
Month	Jan	Feb	Mar	Apr	May	Jun	Jul	Aug	Sep	Oct	Nov	Dec	Year
Mean daily maximum °F (°C)	69.3 (20.7)	70.7 (21.5)	75.2 (24.0)	80 (27)	85.8 (29.9)	89.2 (31.8)	90.2 (32.3)	89.9 (32.2)	88.2 (31.2)	83 (28)	76.6 (24.8)	71.1 (21.7)	80.8 (27.1)
Mean daily minimum °F (°C)	54 (12)	55.2 (12.9)	59.7 (15.4)	64.6 (18.1)	70.8 (21.6)	75.2 (24.0)	76.6 (24.8)	76.8 (24.9)	75.8 (24.3)	70 (21)	62.9 (17.2)	56.3 (13.5)	66.5 (19.2)
Average rainfall inches (mm)	2.76 (70)	2.87 (73)	3.29 (84)	1.92 (49)	2.80 (71)	6.09 (155)	6.72 (171)	8.26 (210)	7.59 (193)	2.64 (67)	2.04 (52)	2.60 (66)	49.58 (1,259)
Average rainy days	6.3	6.1	6.1	4.2	5	10.3	13.5	14.2	12	5.9	5	5.5	94.1
Source: NOAA

Climate data for Dunedin, Florida
Month	Jan	Feb	Mar	Apr	May	Jun	Jul	Aug	Sep	Oct	Nov	Dec	Year
Mean daily maximum °F (°C)	69 (21)	72 (22)	75 (24)	80 (27)	85 (29)	89 (32)	90 (32)	90 (32)	88 (31)	83 (28)	77 (25)	71 (22)	80.75 (27.08)
Mean daily minimum °F (°C)	50 (10)	53 (12)	57 (14)	62 (17)	68 (20)	73 (23)	75 (24)	75 (24)	72 (22)	66 (19)	59 (15)	53 (12)	63.58 (17.54)
Average rainfall inches (mm)	2.99 (76)	3.05 (77)	3.81 (97)	2.37 (60)	2.02 (51)	6.69 (170)	8.09 (205)	8.32 (211)	6.99 (178)	3.31 (84)	2.15 (55)	2.95 (75)	52.74 (1,340)
Average rainy days	4.3	3.9	4.5	3.4	3.6	9.6	11	11.6	8.3	4.1	3.2	3.6	71.1
Source: Weather Channel

== Demographics ==
Historical population
Census	Pop.	Note	%±
1920	28,265		—
1930	62,149		119.9%
1940	91,852		47.8%
1950	159,249		73.4%
1960	374,665		135.3%
1970	522,329		39.4%
1980	728,531		39.5%
1990	851,659		16.9%
2000	921,482		8.2%
2010	916,542		−0.5%
2020	959,107		4.6%
2025 (est.)	948,563	▼	−1.1%
U.S. Decennial Census; 1790–1960 1900–1990; 1990–2000 2010–2021 2022

=== 2020 census ===
As of the 2020 census, the county had a population of 959,107. The median age was 49.3 years. 15.5% of residents were under the age of 18 and 25.3% of residents were 65 years of age or older. For every 100 females there were 92.3 males, and for every 100 females age 18 and over there were 90.2 males age 18 and over. There were 232,884 families residing in the county.

The racial makeup of the county was 73.9% White, 9.8% Black or African American, 0.4% American Indian and Alaska Native, 3.6% Asian, 0.1% Native Hawaiian and Pacific Islander, 3.4% from some other race, and 8.8% from two or more races. Hispanic or Latino residents of any race comprised 10.7% of the population.

99.8% of residents lived in urban areas, while 0.2% lived in rural areas.

There were 442,789 households in the county, of which 19.4% had children under the age of 18 living in them. Of all households, 39.2% were married-couple households, 20.9% were households with a male householder and no spouse or partner present, and 31.9% were households with a female householder and no spouse or partner present. About 36.0% of all households were made up of individuals and 16.8% had someone living alone who was 65 years of age or older.

There were 516,324 housing units, of which 14.2% were vacant. Among occupied housing units, 65.1% were owner-occupied and 34.9% were renter-occupied. The homeowner vacancy rate was 2.0% and the rental vacancy rate was 8.8%.

=== Racial and ethnic composition ===
Pinellas County, Florida – Racial and ethnic composition Note: the US Census treats Hispanic/Latino as an ethnic category. This table excludes Latinos from the racial categories and assigns them to a separate category. Hispanics/Latinos may be of any race.
Race / Ethnicity (NH = Non-Hispanic)	Pop 1980	Pop 1990	Pop 2000	Pop 2010	Pop 2020	% 1980	% 1990	% 2000	% 2010	% 2020
White alone (NH)	658,296	754,802	762,614	704,786	684,463	90.36%	88.63%	82.76%	76.90%	71.36%
Black or African American alone (NH)	54,484	65,046	81,146	91,922	91,431	7.48%	7.64%	8.81%	10.03%	9.53%
Native American or Alaska Native alone (NH)	993	1,863	2,292	2,066	1,942	0.14%	0.22%	0.25%	0.23%	0.20%
Asian alone (NH)	3,134	9,506	18,794	26,749	33,700	0.43%	1.12%	2.04%	2.92%	3.51%
Native Hawaiian or Pacific Islander alone (NH)	x	x	435	724	797	x	x	0.05%	0.08%	0.08%
Other race alone (NH)	1,098	373	1,326	1,802	4,835	0.15%	0.04%	0.14%	0.20%	0.50%
Mixed race or Multiracial (NH)	x	x	12,115	15,252	39,500	x	x	1.31%	1.66%	4.12%
Hispanic or Latino (any race)	10,526	20,069	42,760	73,241	102,439	1.44%	2.36%	4.64%	7.99%	10.68%
Total	728,531	851,659	921,482	916,542	959,107	100.00%	100.00%	100.00%	100.00%	100.00%

=== 2010 census ===
U.S. Census Bureau 2010 Ethnic/Race Demographics:

- White (non-Hispanic) (82.1% when including White Hispanics): 76.9% (17.7% German, 15.5% Irish, 12.6% English, 8.9% Italian, 4.3% Polish, 4.0% French, 2.6% Scottish, 1.9% Scotch-Irish, 1.7% Dutch, 1.4% Swedish, 1.4% Greek, 1.1% Russian, 1.0% French Canadian, 0.9% Norwegian, 0.8% Welsh, 0.8% Hungarian, 0.5% Czech, 0.5% Portuguese, 0.5% Ukrainian)
- Black or African-American (non-Hispanic) (10.3% when including Black Hispanics): 10.0% (0.6% Subsaharan African, 0.5% West Indian/Afro-Caribbean American [0.2% Jamaican, 0.1% Haitian, 0.1% Trinidadian and Tobagonian, 0.1% Other or Unspecified West Indian])
- Hispanic or Latino of any race: 8.0% (2.4% Puerto Rican, 2.4% Mexican, 0.9% Cuban)
- Asian: 3.0% (0.8% Vietnamese, 0.7% Other Asian, 0.6% Indian, 0.5% Filipino, 0.3% Chinese, 0.1% Korean, 0.1% Japanese)
- Two or more races: 2.2%
- American Indian and Alaska Native: 0.3%
- Native Hawaiian and Other Pacific Islander: 0.1%
- Other Races: 2.0% (0.6% Arab)

In 2010, 6.5% of the population considered themselves to be of only American ancestry (regardless of race or ethnicity.)

There were 415,876 households, out of which 19.89% had children under the age of 18 living with them, 40.33% were married couples living together, 11.86% had a female householder with no husband present, and 43.67% were non-families. 35.42% of all households were made up of individuals, and 15.14% (4.53% male and 10.61% female) had someone living alone who was 65 years of age or older. The average household size was 2.16 and the average family size was 2.79.

The age distribution is 17.8% under the age of 18, 7.3% from 18 to 24, 23.0% from 25 to 44, 30.8% from 45 to 64, and 21.2% who were 65 years of age or older. The median age was 46.3 years. For every 100 females there were 92.3 males. For every 100 females age 18 and over, there were 89.8 males.

The median income for a household in the county was $45,258, and the median income for a family was $58,335. Males had a median income of $41,537 versus $35,003 for females. The per capita income for the county was $28,742. About 8.1% of families and 12.1% of the population were below the poverty line, including 17.7% of those under age 18 and 9.0% of those aged 65 or over.

In 2010, 11.2% of the county's population was foreign born, with 50.3% being naturalized American citizens. Of foreign-born residents, 33.6% were born in Europe, 32.1% were born in Latin America, 20.9% born in Asia, 9.8% in North America, 3.0% born in Africa, and 0.6% were born in Oceania.

=== List of cities by population ===
The following is a list of all cities, towns, and census-designated places in Pinellas County, Florida.

Source: 2010 Florida Census of Population and Housing

Name	Type	2010 census
St. Petersburg	City	244,769
Clearwater	City	107,685
Largo	City	77,648
Palm Harbor	CDP	57,439
Pinellas Park	City	49,079
Dunedin	City	35,962
East Lake	CDP	30,962
Tarpon Springs	City	23,484
Lealman	CDP	19,879
Seminole	City	17,233
Safety Harbor	City	16,884
West Lealman	CDP	15,651
Oldsmar	City	13,591
Gulfport	City	12,029
Bardmoor	CDP	9,732
St. Pete Beach	City	9,346
Treasure Island	City	6,705
South Highpoint	CDP	5,195
Kenneth City	Town	4,980
South Pasadena	City	4,964
Madeira Beach	City	4,263
Indian Rocks Beach	City	4,113
Belleair	Town	3,869
Tierra Verde	CDP	3,721
Feather Sound	CDP	3,420
Bay Pines	CDP	2,931
Harbor Bluffs	CDP	2,860
Ridgecrest	CDP	2,558
Greenbriar	CDP	2,502
Redington Shores	Town	2,121
Belleair Bluffs	City	2,031
Bear Creek	CDP	1,948
Belleair Beach	City	1,560
Redington Beach	Town	1,427
Indian Shores	Town	1,420
North Redington Beach	Town	1,417
Belleair Shore	Town	109

=== 2000 census ===
As of 2000, there were 921,482 people, 414,968 households, and 243,171 families residing in the county. The population density was 1,271/km^{2} (3,292/sq mi), making it the most densely populated county in Florida. There were 481,573 housing units at an average density of 1,720 per square mile (660/km^{2}). The racial makeup of the county was 85.85% White (82.8% were Non-Hispanic White,) 8.96% Black or African American, 0.30% Native American, 2.06% Asian, 0.05% Pacific Islander, 1.14% from other races, and 1.64% from two or more races. 4.64% of the population were Hispanic or Latino of any race.

There were 414,968 households, out of which 22.10% had children under the age of 18 living with them, 44.80% were married couples living together, 10.50% had a female householder with no husband present, and 41.40% were non-families. 34.10% of all households were made up of individuals, and 15.50% had someone living alone who was 65 years of age or older. The average household size was 2.17 and the average family size was 2.77.

In the county, the population was spread out, with 19.30% under the age of 18, 6.40% from 18 to 24, 27.30% from 25 to 44, 24.50% from 45 to 64, and 22.50% who were 65 years of age or older. The median age was 43 years. For every 100 females there were 91.00 males. For every 100 females age 18 and over, there were 87.80 males.

In 2000, 87.8% of persons age 25 or above were high school graduates, slightly above Florida's average of 84.9% for Florida. 26.7% of persons age 25 or above held a bachelor's degree or higher, also slightly higher than Florida's rate of 25.6%.

The median income for a household in the county was $37,111, and the median income for a family was $46,925. Males had a median income of $32,264 versus $26,281 for females. The per capita income for the county was $23,497. About 6.70% of families and 10.00% of the population were below the poverty line, including 13.90% of those under age 18 and 8.20% of those age 65 or over.

In 2000, as Florida's 6th and the nation's 53rd most populous county, Pinellas has a population greater than that of the individual states of Wyoming, Montana, Delaware, South Dakota, Alaska, North Dakota, and Vermont, as well as the District of Columbia. With a population density (as of the 2000 census) of 3292 inhabitants/mi^{2}, Pinellas County is by far the most densely populated county in the state, more than double that of Broward County, the next most densely populated.

=== Languages ===
As of 2010, 87.17% of all residents spoke English as their first language, while 5.56% spoke Spanish, 0.78% Vietnamese, 0.70% French, 0.65% Greek, 0.56% German, and 0.52% of the population spoke Serbo-Croatian as their mother language. In total, 12.83% of the population spoke languages other than English as their primary language.

== Government ==
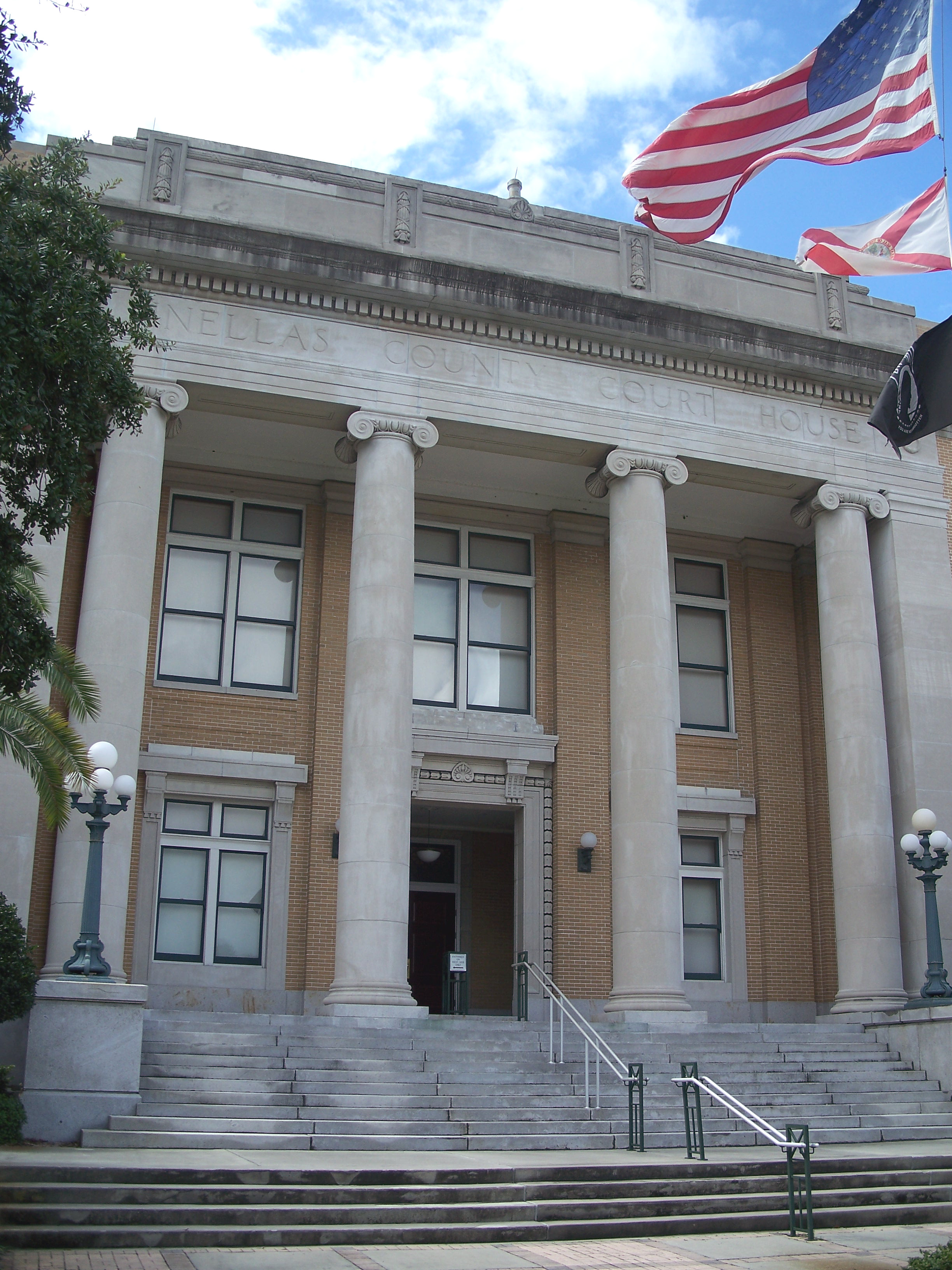
The Old Pinellas County Courthouse in Clearwater

The Board of County Commissioners governs all unincorporated areas of the county under the state's constitution, with the power to adopt ordinances, approve the county budget, set millages, and provide services. The county's municipalities, while governing their own affairs, may call upon the county for specialized services. The county administrator, appointed by and reporting to the Board, oversees most of the day-to-day operations of the county. In November 2024, Pinellas County voters approved a charter amendment (Amendment 1) that established term limits for County Commissioners, restricting them to twelve consecutive years of service.

As of 2025, The members of the Board are as follows:

- Chris Scherer (R): At-Large District #1 (2024–present)
- Brian Scott (R): At-Large District #2 (2022–present) (chair)
- Vince Nowicki (R): At-Large District #3 (2024–present)
- Dave Eggers (R), Single-Member District #4 (2014–present) (vice chair)
- Chris Latvala (R), Single-Member District #5 (2022–present)
- Kathleen Peters (R): Single-Member District #6 (2019–present)
- Rene Flowers (D): Single-Member District #7 (2020–present)
- Barry Burton: County Administrator (2018–present)

The county's government website won a "Sunny Award" from Sunshine Review in 2010 for its proactive disclosure of government data.

== Politics ==
United States presidential election results for Pinellas County, Florida
Year	Republican		Democratic		Third party(ies)	
Year	No.	%	No.	%	No.	%
1912	87	6.14%	853	60.16%	478	33.71%
1916	555	22.86%	1,503	61.90%	370	15.24%
1920	2,529	43.46%	2,848	48.94%	442	7.60%
1924	2,872	47.53%	2,633	43.57%	538	8.90%
1928	10,545	74.52%	3,439	24.30%	167	1.18%
1932	7,024	42.07%	9,670	57.93%	0	0.00%
1936	8,183	40.40%	12,072	59.60%	0	0.00%
1940	13,327	41.30%	18,941	58.70%	0	0.00%
1944	14,340	42.28%	19,574	57.72%	0	0.00%
1948	24,900	55.92%	15,724	35.32%	3,900	8.76%
1952	55,691	71.35%	22,365	28.65%	0	0.00%
1956	74,314	72.55%	28,113	27.45%	0	0.00%
1960	101,779	63.68%	58,054	36.32%	0	0.00%
1964	80,414	44.98%	98,381	55.02%	0	0.00%
1968	109,235	51.71%	68,209	32.29%	33,814	16.01%
1972	179,541	69.83%	77,197	30.02%	378	0.15%
1976	150,003	50.75%	141,879	48.00%	3,687	1.25%
1980	185,728	53.83%	138,428	40.12%	20,847	6.04%
1984	240,612	65.16%	128,574	34.82%	63	0.02%
1988	211,049	57.76%	152,420	41.72%	1,901	0.52%
1992	159,121	37.63%	160,528	37.96%	103,202	24.41%
1996	152,155	40.44%	184,748	49.10%	39,369	10.46%
2000	184,849	46.38%	200,657	50.35%	13,020	3.27%
2004	225,686	49.56%	225,460	49.51%	4,211	0.92%
2008	210,066	45.16%	248,299	53.38%	6,787	1.46%
2012	213,258	46.45%	239,104	52.08%	6,750	1.47%
2016	239,201	48.08%	233,701	46.98%	24,583	4.94%
2020	276,209	49.22%	277,450	49.44%	7,502	1.34%
2024	269,472	52.11%	242,452	46.89%	5,150	1.00%

In national politics, Pinellas County, was one of the first areas of Florida to break from the Solid South and elect Republicans to public office. Riding on the coattails of Herbert Hoover's victory in the 1928 election, Albert R. Welsh was elected to the Florida Senate and Kenneth W. Kerr to the Florida House of Representatives. In that same election, Gladstone R. Beattie, became the Pinellas County Sheriff and first Republican sheriff in Florida since Reconstruction, and Harry R. Hewitt became the Pinellas County Judge and the first Republican county judge in Florida. In 1951, Pinellas was the first county to send a majority-Republican delegation to the Florida House of Representatives in the twentieth-century.

From 1948 to 1988, it went Republican in every presidential election except Lyndon Johnson's 44-state landslide of 1964. However, for the last quarter-century, as part of the I-4 Corridor stretching from Tampa Bay to Orlando, Florida, it has been a powerful swing county in one of the nation's most critical swing states. Voter registration is almost tied, with Republicans having a small plurality of registered voters. It is closely divided between predominantly liberal St. Petersburg and its predominantly suburban and conservative north and beaches. Due in part to the more populated southern portion around St. Petersburg, it has supported a Democrat for president in all but three elections since 1992. The brand of Republicanism in Pinellas County has traditionally been a moderate one, so the county has become friendlier to Democrats as a result of the national GOP having shifted right.

In 2000, Al Gore became the first Democrat to win a majority of the county's vote since 1964, and only the second since Franklin D. Roosevelt. In 2004, Pinellas County swung the other way when George W. Bush carried the county by a narrow plurality of 49.56% (225,686 votes), with John Kerry following closely behind with 49.51% (225,460 votes)—a margin of just 226 votes. In the 2012 Presidential Election, Barack Obama won Pinellas with 52% of the vote (239,104 votes) to Mitt Romney's 46.5% (213,258 votes), slightly narrower than Obama's 2008 election results in Pinellas of 53% (248,299 votes) to John McCain's 45% (210,066 votes). Republican victories in the county since Bush in 1988 have been narrow pluralities. The exception to this is Donald Trump in 2024, who won the county with nearly 52% of the vote.

The county is considered a bellwether politically.

In the 2012 U.S. Senate election, Pinellas voters helped re-elect U.S. Senator Bill Nelson over challenger Connie Mack IV with 59% of the vote, greater than his statewide average of 55%. In the 2010 U.S. Senate election, Pinellas was one of only four Florida counties won by outgoing Republican Governor Charlie Crist, a St. Petersburg native, who won 42% of Pinellas voters running as an Independent in a three-way race with Republican nominee (and eventual winner) Marco Rubio and former Democratic U.S. Representative Kendrick Meek, who won 37% and 16.8% of the Pinellas vote, respectively. Statewide, Rubio won almost 49% of the vote to Crist's 29.7% and Meek's 20% in a highly polarized election that would witness Crist depart from the Republican Party and eventually become a Democrat.

In the 2024 election, Pinellas County shifted markedly to the right, with Donald Trump winning the county by just over 5 percentage points. This shift coincided with Republicans securing a supermajority on the Board of County Commissioners.

In the House of Representatives, most of Pinellas is represented by Republican Anna Paulina Luna of the 13th district. Most of the city of St. Petersburg, including the most Democratic parts of Pinellas, is represented by Democrat Kathy Castor of the 14th district, which spans the Tampa Bay. The way this map has been drawn has been considered an example of a pro-Republican gerrymander, given the previous Democratic lean of the 13th.

In state politics, portions of Pinellas are represented in the Florida Senate by Democratic State Senator Darryl Rouson (District 16) and Republican State Senators Nick DiCeglie (District 18) and Ed Hooper (District 21). In the Florida House parts of the county are represented by Republicans Adam Anderson (District 57-Palm Harbor, Tarpon Springs), Kim Berfield (District 58-Clearwater), Berny Jacques (District 59-Largo), and Linda Chaney (District 61), as well as Democrat Lindsay Cross (District 60-Pinellas Park). Portions of St. Pete are also included in District 62, represented by Michele Rayner-Goolsby.

=== Voter registration ===
Voter registration data is as of April 2025.

Party	Number of Voters	%
Republican	236,269	36.61%
Democratic	203,666	31.56%
Other	181,999	28.2%
Total	645,309	100%

== Education ==
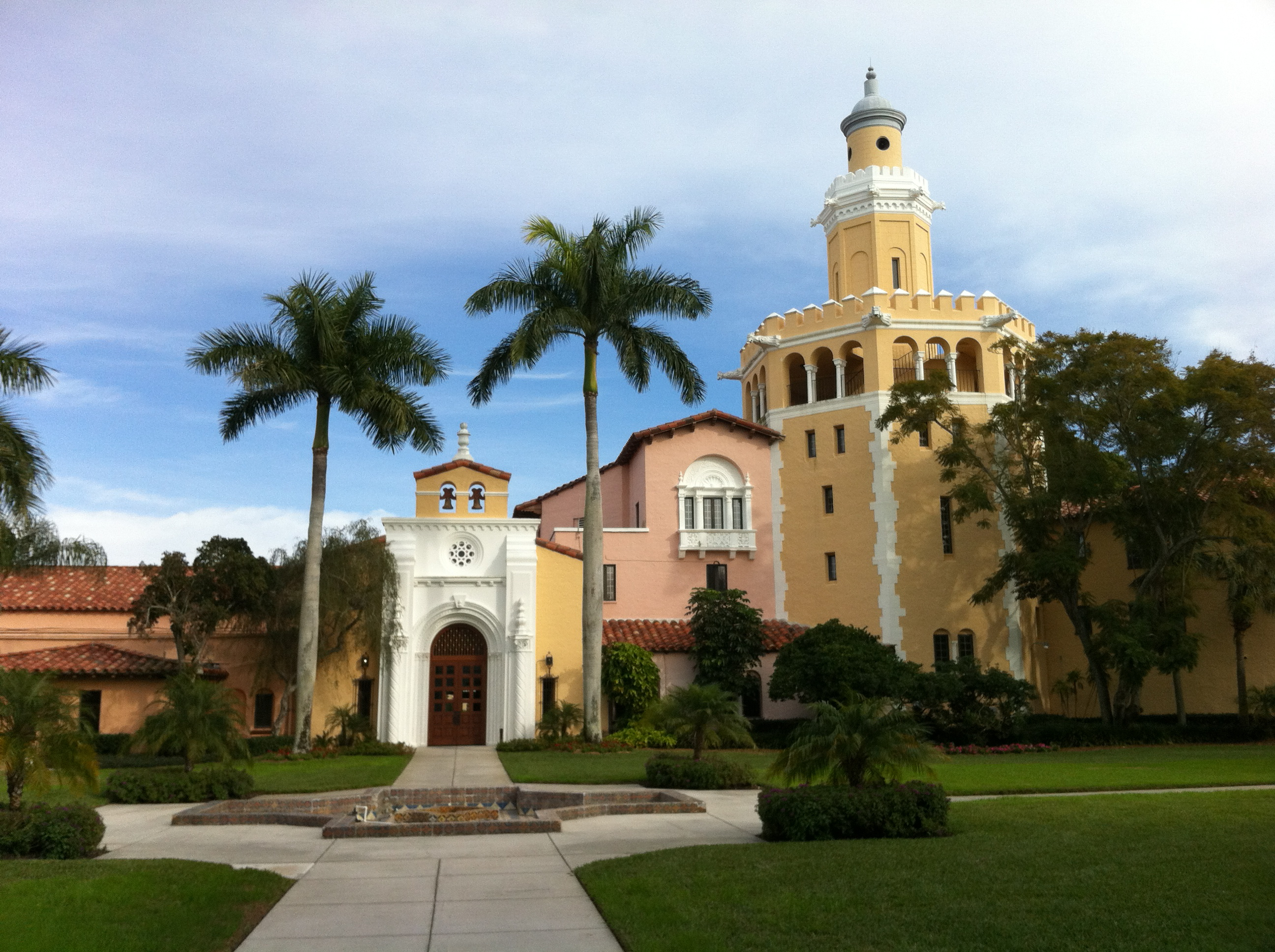
Stetson University College of Law in Gulfport

=== Primary and secondary education ===
==== Pinellas County School District ====
The entire county is served by the Pinellas County School District. The current superintendent is Kevin Hendrick. The district, the nation's 24th largest, comprises 143 schools, including 72 elementary schools, 18 middle schools, two K–8 schools, 17 high schools, and 35 additional facilities including ESE, adult ed, career/technical, and charters. The district also operates the K–12 Pinellas Virtual School (PVS). Among the many notable magnet programs in the district are three International Baccalaureate (IB) programs, at St. Petersburg High School, Palm Harbor University High School, and Largo High School, Project Lead the Way's (PLTW) engineering program at East Lake High School, the Center for Advanced Technologies (CAT) at Lakewood High School, the Pinellas County Center for the Arts (PCCA) at Gibbs High School, the Advanced International Certificate of Education (AICE) at Hollins High School, Clearwater High School, Tarpon Springs High School, and Northeast High School, four middle school Centers for Gifted Studies, at Thurgood Marshall Fundamental, Morgan Fitzgerald, John Hopkins and Dunedin Highland Middle Schools, and Florida's only Fundamental High School, at Osceola High School.

=== Private Schools ===
The county is also home to many private schools, including Admiral Farragut Academy, Canterbury School, Calvary Christian, Clearwater Central Catholic, Keswick Christian School, Shorecrest Preparatory School, Indian Rocks Christian School and St. Petersburg Catholic High School, among others.

=== Colleges and universities ===
Pinellas County is home several institutions of higher learning, including Eckerd College, the University of South Florida St. Petersburg, Nova Southeastern University, the multi-campus St. Petersburg College, the Stetson University College of Law in Gulfport, and the main campus of Schiller International University in Largo, after previously being located in Dunedin.

=== Libraries ===
The Pinellas Public Library Cooperative (PPLC) has 14 member libraries:

- Clearwater Public Library System
- Dunedin Public Library
- East Lake Community Library
- Gulf Beaches Public Library
- Gulfport Public Library
- Largo Public Library
- Oldsmar Public Library
- Palm Harbor Library
- Barbara S. Ponce Public Library
- Safety Harbor Public Library
- St. Petersburg Library System
- St. Pete Beach Public Library
- Seminole Community Library
- Tarpon Springs Public Library

The Pinellas Public Library Cooperative was established by referendum in March 1989 to serve the unincorporated areas of Pinellas County. The original Interlocal Agreement, which described the legal basis, leadership and operations of the Cooperative, was signed by sixteen cities, the taxing district of Palm Harbor, and the County in 1989. In 1994, the City of Clearwater applied for and became a member of the Cooperative, which made all existing public libraries in the county members of the first countywide public library cooperative in Florida.

The Pinellas Talking Book Library is administered through the Pinellas Public Library Cooperative. It serves county residents who are unable to read standard print material due to visual, physical or learning disabilities whether permanent or temporary. It provides free access to recorded, Braille, and Large print materials as well as a collection of descriptive videos. These materials are sent to members through postage free mail.

==== Mobile Book Bus ====
Part of the Pinellas Public Library Cooperative's efforts to reach out to underserved communities, is coordinating with the Juvenile Wellness Board, which hosts a Summer Book Bus Program. Under this program, mobile book buses go to each of the PPLC libraries and other community locations, giving away free books during the summers to encourage reading proficiency among children from beginner to the third grade. Each summer on average more than 12,000 books are given away to children in Pinellas County through this program.

== Economy ==
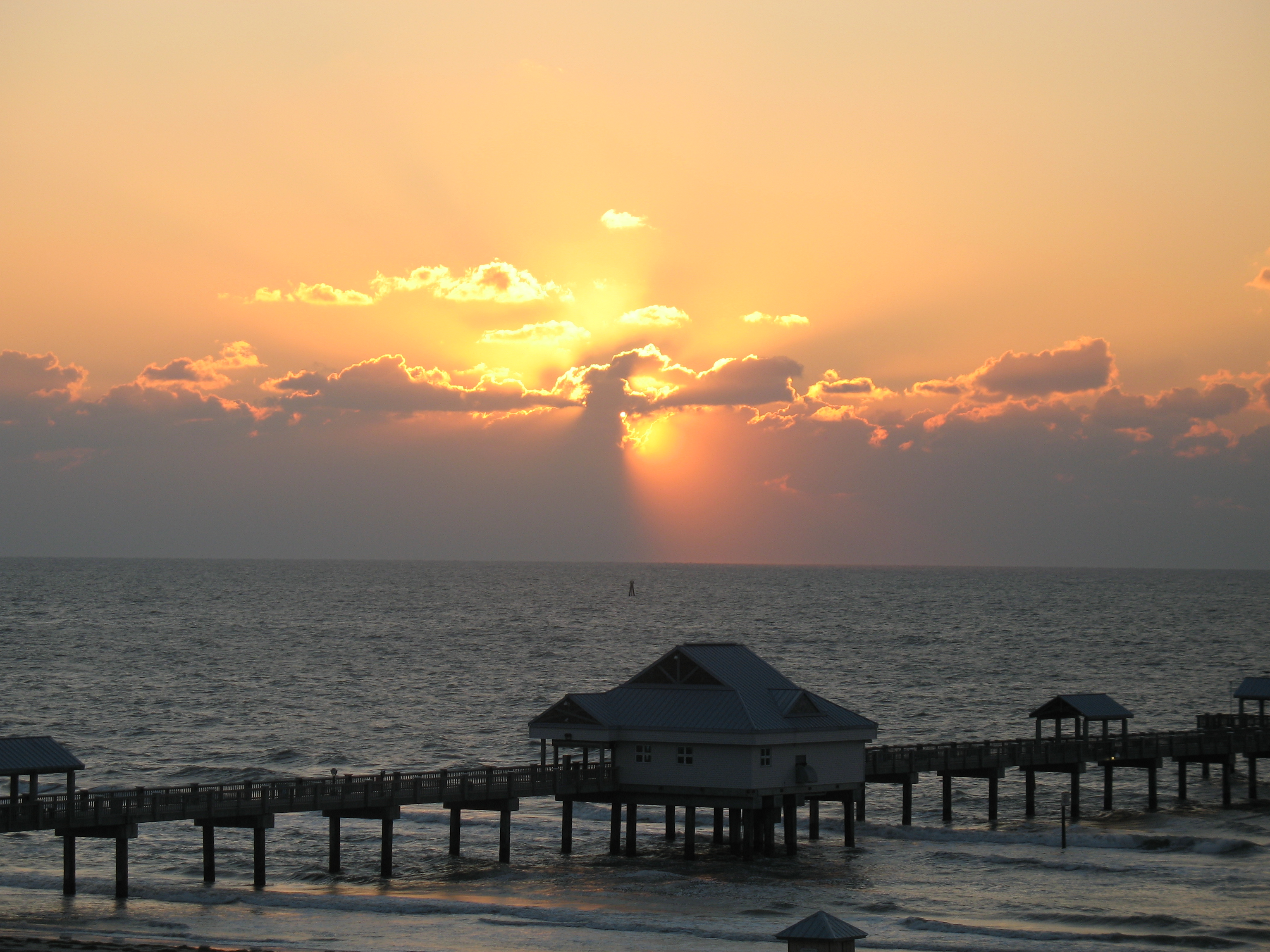
Sunset on Clearwater Beach

=== Historical economic strengths ===
Agriculture was the single most important industry in Pinellas until the early 20th century, with much of the best land devoted to citrus production. Cattle ranching was another major industry. In 1885 the American Medical Society declared the Pinellas peninsula the "healthiest spot on earth", which helped spur the growth of the tourist industry.

=== Economy today ===
Anchored by the urban markets of Clearwater and St. Petersburg, Pinellas has the second largest base of manufacturing employment in Florida.

Pinellas has various, yet symbiotic, industry clusters, including aviation/aerospace, defense/national security, medical technologies, business and financial services, and information technology.

Fortune 500 technology manufacturers Jabil Circuit and Tech Data and a Fortune 500 financial company Raymond James Financial are headquartered in the Gateway area in and adjacent to Pinellas. Other large companies include HSN, Nielsen, and Valpak.

Service industries such as healthcare, business services and education account for more than 200,000 jobs in the county, generating almost $19 billion in revenue. Other major sectors include retail, with close to 100,000 employees in jobs such as food service, bars, and retail sales generating $12 billion for the local economy in 2010, and industries related to finance, insurance and real estate with approximately 44,000 workers generating $8.5 billion in sales.

== Culture ==
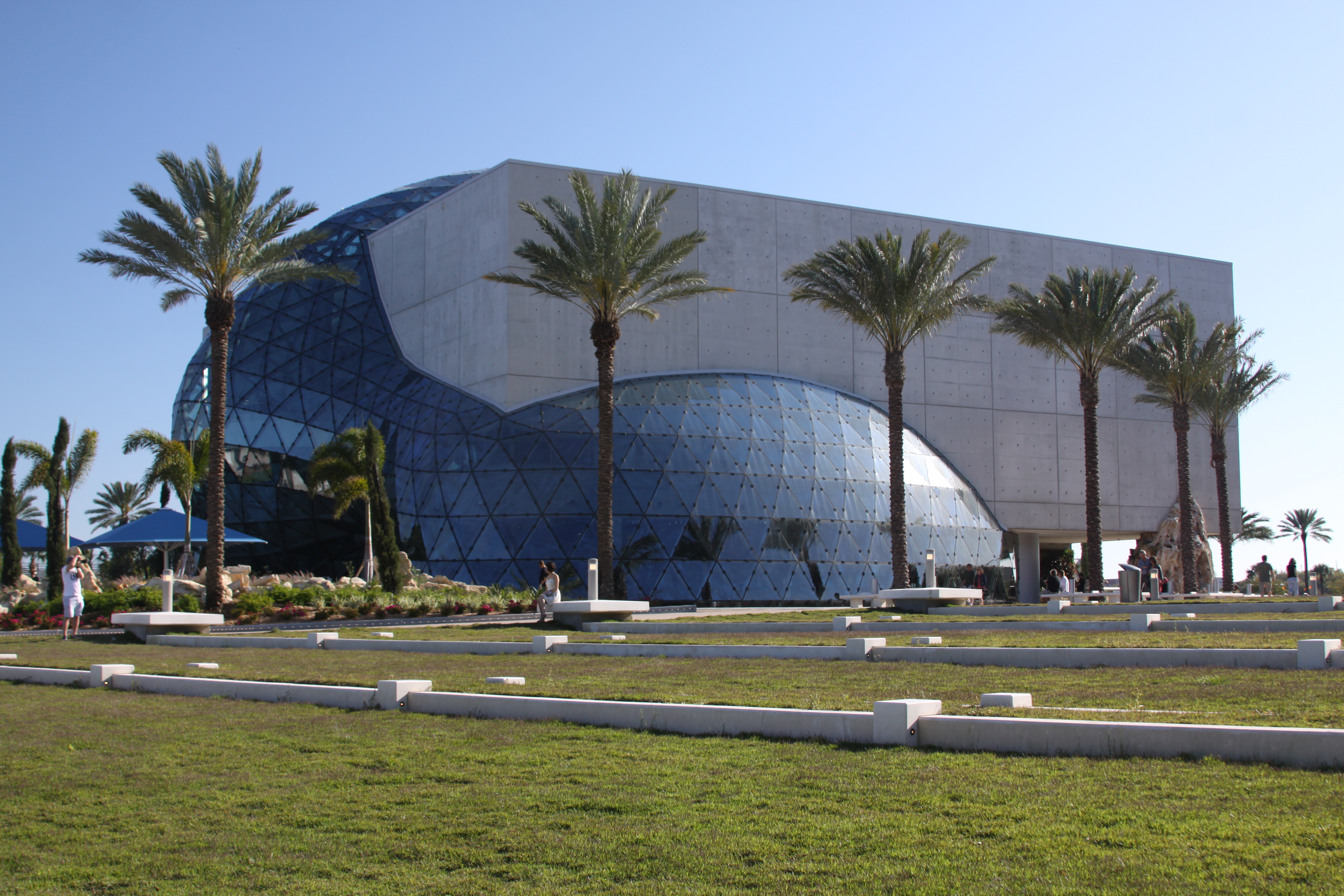
The Salvador Dalí Museum

=== Museums ===
- Museum of Fine Arts near the Pier in downtown St. Petersburg
- Salvador Dalí Museum in downtown St. Petersburg
- The James Museum of Western & Wildlife Art in downtown St. Petersburg
- Florida Holocaust Museum in downtown St. Petersburg
- Morean Arts Center in downtown St. Petersburg
- Dr. Carter G. Woodson African American Museum in South St. Petersburg
- Leepa-Rattner Museum of Art on the Tarpon Springs Campus of St. Petersburg College
- Great Explorations Children's Museum in St. Petersburg
- Dunedin History Museum in Dunedin
- Imagine Museum in St. Petersburg
- Museum of the Arts and Crafts Movement (MAACM) in St. Petersburg
- St. Petersburg Museum of History in downtown St. Petersburg
- Chihuly Collection in downtown St. Petersburg
- Great Explorations Children's Museum in St. Petersburg

=== Performing arts venues ===
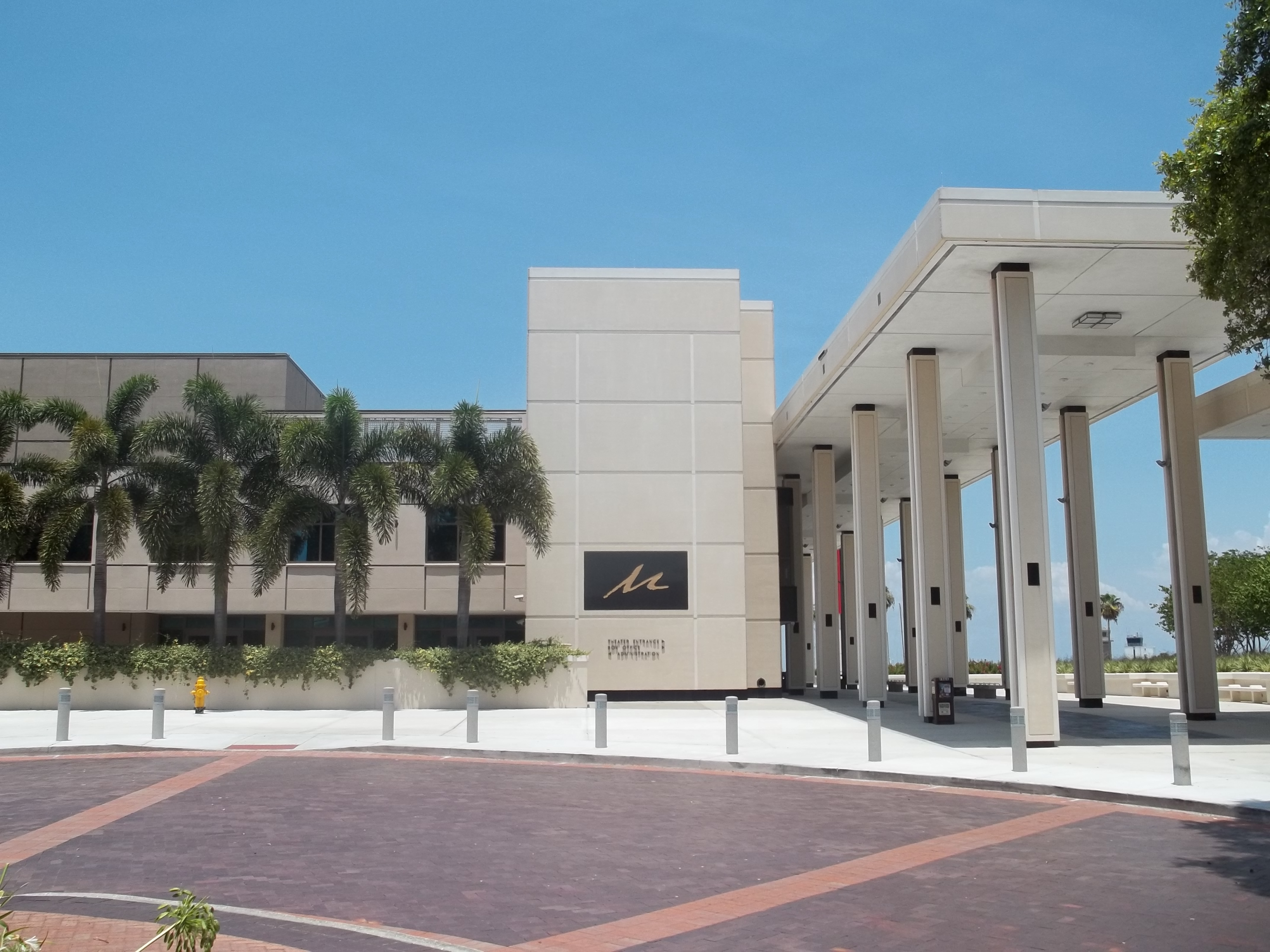
Duke Energy Center For The Arts--Mahaffey Theater

- Ruth Eckerd Hall in Clearwater
- The BayCare Sound in Clearwater
- Mahaffey Theater in St. Petersburg
- Jannus Landing in St. Petersburg
- Palladium at St. Petersburg College in St. Petersburg
- freeFall Theatre in St. Petersburg
- American Stage in St. Petersburg
- Studio@620 in St. Petersburg

The Florida Orchestra splits its performances between Ruth Eckerd Hall, the Mahaffey Theater, and the Straz Center for the Performing Arts in Tampa. Clearwater Jazz Holiday held every October in Coachman Park in downtown Clearwater; in its 32nd year.

=== Other points of interest ===
Long established communities, particularly Old Northeast in St. Petersburg, Pass-a-Grille in St. Pete Beach, Harbor Oaks in Clearwater, and old Tarpon Springs contain notable historic architecture.

The area has embraced farmer's markets, with St. Petersburg's Saturday Morning Market drawing large crowds, and other markets located weekly in several other parts of the county also seeing a growth in popularity.

Downtowns in St. Petersburg and Dunedin, and many of the beaches, especially Clearwater Beach, all feature Nightlife activities.

In addition to the above-mentioned Heritage Village in Largo, a number of small local history museums operate within the county: the St. Petersburg Museum of History on the downtown St. Petersburg waterfront, the Gulf Beaches Historical Museum in Pass-a-Grille, the Dunedin History Museum in Dunedin, the Palm Harbor Museum in Palm Harbor, and the Historic Depot Museum in Tarpon Springs all provide visitors a glimpse of the area's history.

Two botanical gardens are located within the county: the Florida Botanical Gardens, a part of the Pinewood Cultural Park in Largo, and Sunken Gardens, a former tourist attraction located in and now run by the City of St. Petersburg.

Indian Shores is home to the Suncoast Seabird Sanctuary, currently the largest non-profit wild bird hospital in the United States and considered one of the top avian rehabilitation centers in the world. A variety of species can be found at the sanctuary, which is open 365 days a year and is free to the public.

On Clearwater Beach is the Clearwater Marine Aquarium, a non-profit dedicated to the rescue, rehabilitation and release of injured marine animals and public education. CMA's best-known permanent resident, is Winter, a bottlenose dolphin who was rescued in December 2005 after having her tail caught in a crab trap. Her injuries caused the loss of her tail; CMA successfully fitted Winter with a prosthetic tail which brought worldwide attention to the facility. Winter was the subject of the 2011 film Dolphin Tale, shot partially on location at CMA.

On the south end of Anclote Key, off of Tarpon Springs, is the Anclote Key Light, a lighthouse built in 1887. The light is Pinellas County's only functioning lighthouse, and one of only two in the Tampa Bay area. The light was deactivated in 1984, but by 2003 had been restored and as of 2013 continues to be in use. The island forms Anclote Key Preserve State Park and is accessible only by private boat.

Dunedin is home to the Dunedin Brewery, Florida's oldest microbrewery.

== Sports and recreation ==
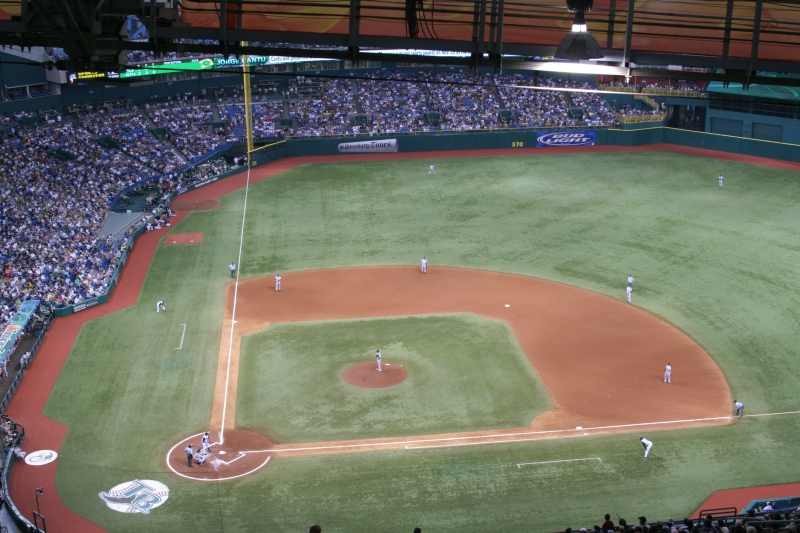
Tropicana Field, home of the Tampa Bay Rays

=== Sports teams ===
==== Tampa Bay Rays ====
Professionally, baseball's Tampa Bay Rays have historically played at Tropicana Field in St. Petersburg. However, in October 2024, the stadium's roof was destroyed by Hurricane Milton, rendering the facility unusable for the 2025 season. Consequently, the Rays temporarily relocated their home games to George M. Steinbrenner Field in Tampa for the 2025 season. Before the storm, the Pinellas County Commission and St. Petersburg City Council had approved a financing agreement for a new stadium as part of the Historic Gas Plant District redevelopment, though the timeline faced scrutiny following the hurricane damage.

==== Baseball spring training ====
During spring training, the Philadelphia Phillies play at BayCare Ballpark in Clearwater while the Toronto Blue Jays play at TD Ballpark in Dunedin.

==== Minor league baseball teams ====
Additionally, Minor League Baseball affiliates of those teams play at their spring training ballparks; the Clearwater Threshers play at BayCare Ballpark and the Dunedin Blue Jays play at TD Ballpark.

==== Tampa Bay Rowdies ====
The Tampa Bay Rowdies of the USL Championship play at Al Lang Stadium in St. Petersburg

The Honda Grand Prix of St. Petersburg is held every spring on the downtown St. Petersburg waterfront.

==== PGA Tour ====
The PGA Tour plays its Valspar Championship annually in March on the Copperhead Course at the Innisbrook Golf Resort in Palm Harbor.

=== Recreational areas ===
- Skyway Fishing Pier State Park: Remnants of the approaches to the original Sunshine Skyway Bridge and the longest fishing pier in the world.
- Fred Marquis Pinellas Trail: 37-mile running and cycling trail over a former railroad bed connecting Tarpon Springs to St. Petersburg.

Other popular fishing locations include Pier 60 on Clearwater Beach and the Gulf and Bay Piers at Fort De Soto Park, as well as countless spots along the bridges and passes of the area, among many others.

Pinellas County's coastal geography, with a long system of barrier islands on the Gulf and small-to-large mangrove islands dotting the waters on all sides, provides for an extensive series of blueways that are enjoyed by kayakers of all ability levels. The county also maintains a series of artificial reefs in the Gulf which are popular spots for fishing and scuba diving

The county's two largest freshwater lakes, Lake Tarpon (accessible through Chestnut and Anderson parks) and Lake Seminole (accessible through Lake Seminole Park), are popular for water skiing, jet-skiing, and sailing, as well as for fishing and kayaking.

Both the North Beach of Fort De Soto Park (2005) and Caladesi Island (2008) have been named by Dr. Beach as America's Top Beach.

== Media ==
Pinellas County, as a part of the Tampa Bay area (the nation's 14th largest television market), is served by fourteen local broadcast television stations, as well as a variety of cable-only local stations. More than 70 FM and AM stations compete for listenership in what is the nation's 19th largest radio market.

Major daily newspapers serving Pinellas are the Tampa Bay Times, known as the St. Petersburg Times from 1884 to 2011 and first in circulation and readership, and The Tampa Tribune. The Times also distributes a free daily (Monday-Friday) tabloid called tbt* in the most heavily populated areas of the county. Creative Loafing Tampa is the main alternative weekly.

== Transportation ==
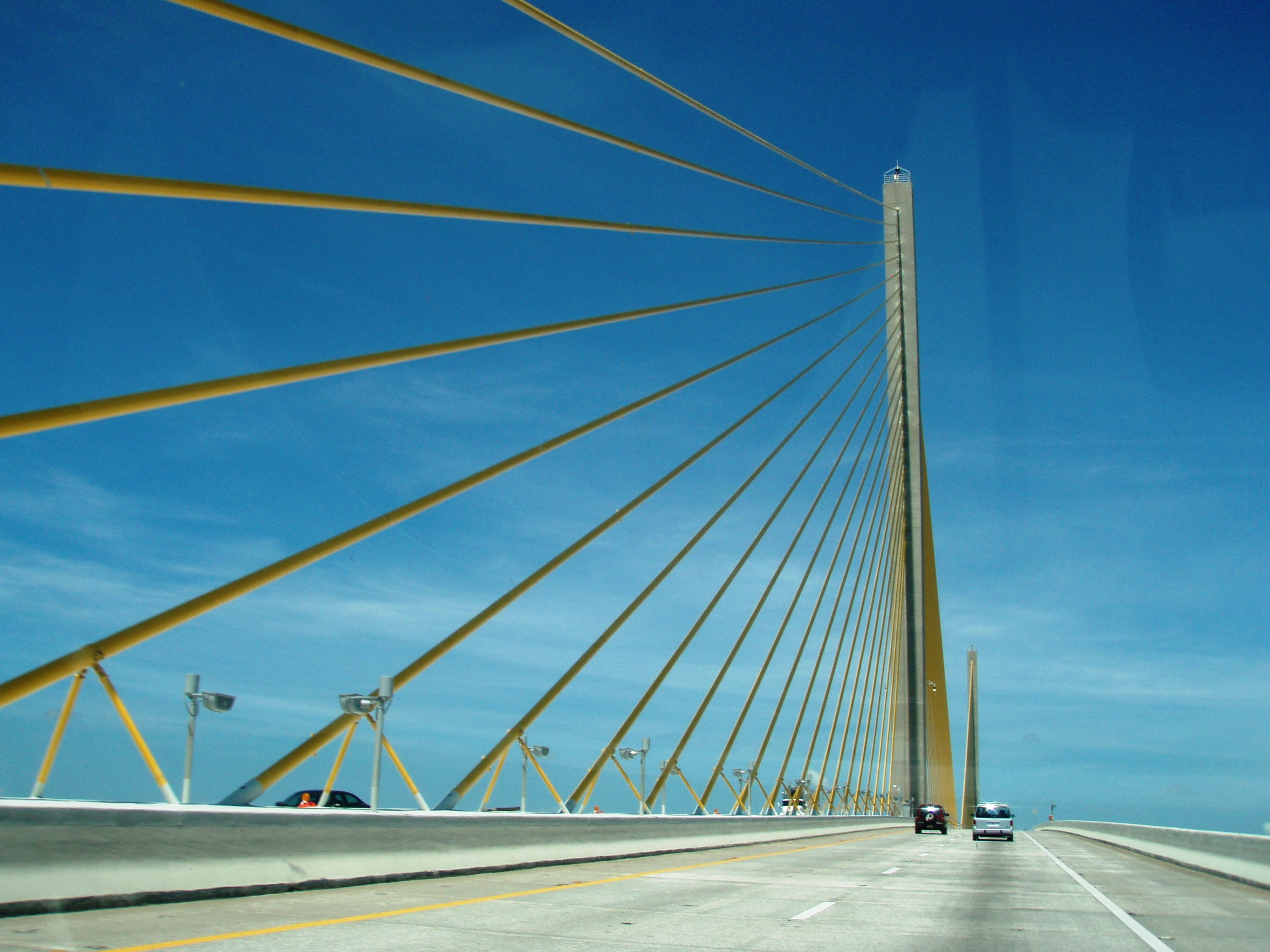
The Sunshine Skyway Bridge

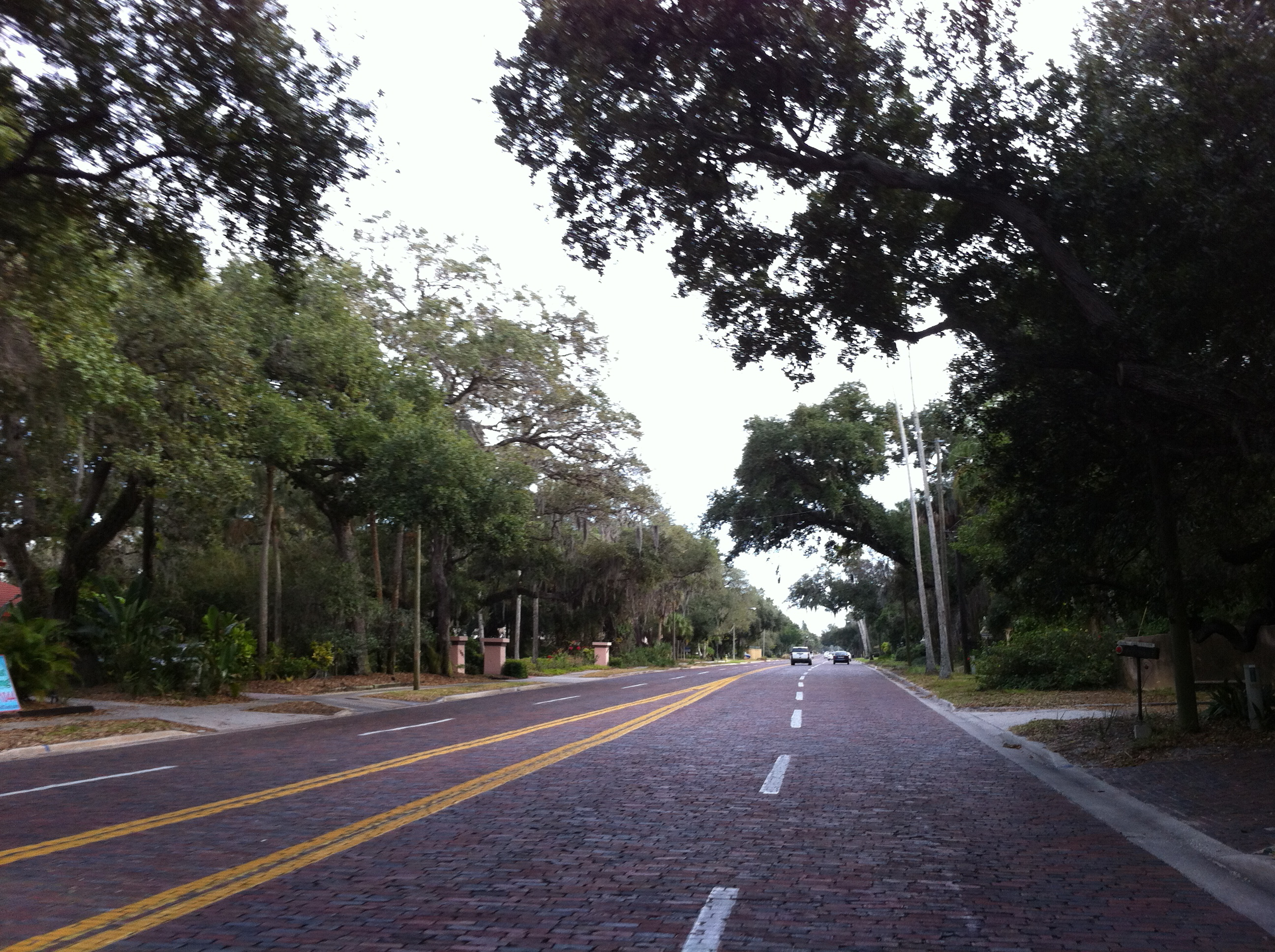
Brick-covered section of Park St. in the Jungle Prada neighborhood of St. Petersburg

=== Major highways ===
- I-175 / SR 594
- I-275 / SR 93
- I-375 / SR 592
- US 19
- US 19 Alt. / SR 595
- US 92
- SR 60
- SR 580
- SR 586
- SR 590
- SR 679
- SR 682
- SR 686
- SR 687
- SR 688
- SR 689
- SR 693
- SR 694
- SR 699

=== Airports ===
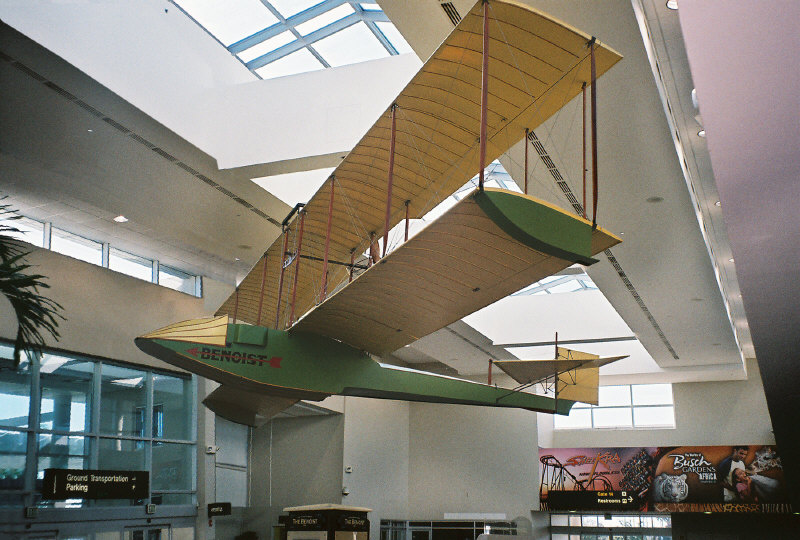
Replica of the airplane flown by Tony Jannus at St. Pete–Clearwater International Airport

- St. Pete–Clearwater International Airport in Pinellas Park
- Albert Whitted Airport in St. Petersburg
- Clearwater Executive Airpark
- Tampa International Airport in Tampa

=== Railroads ===
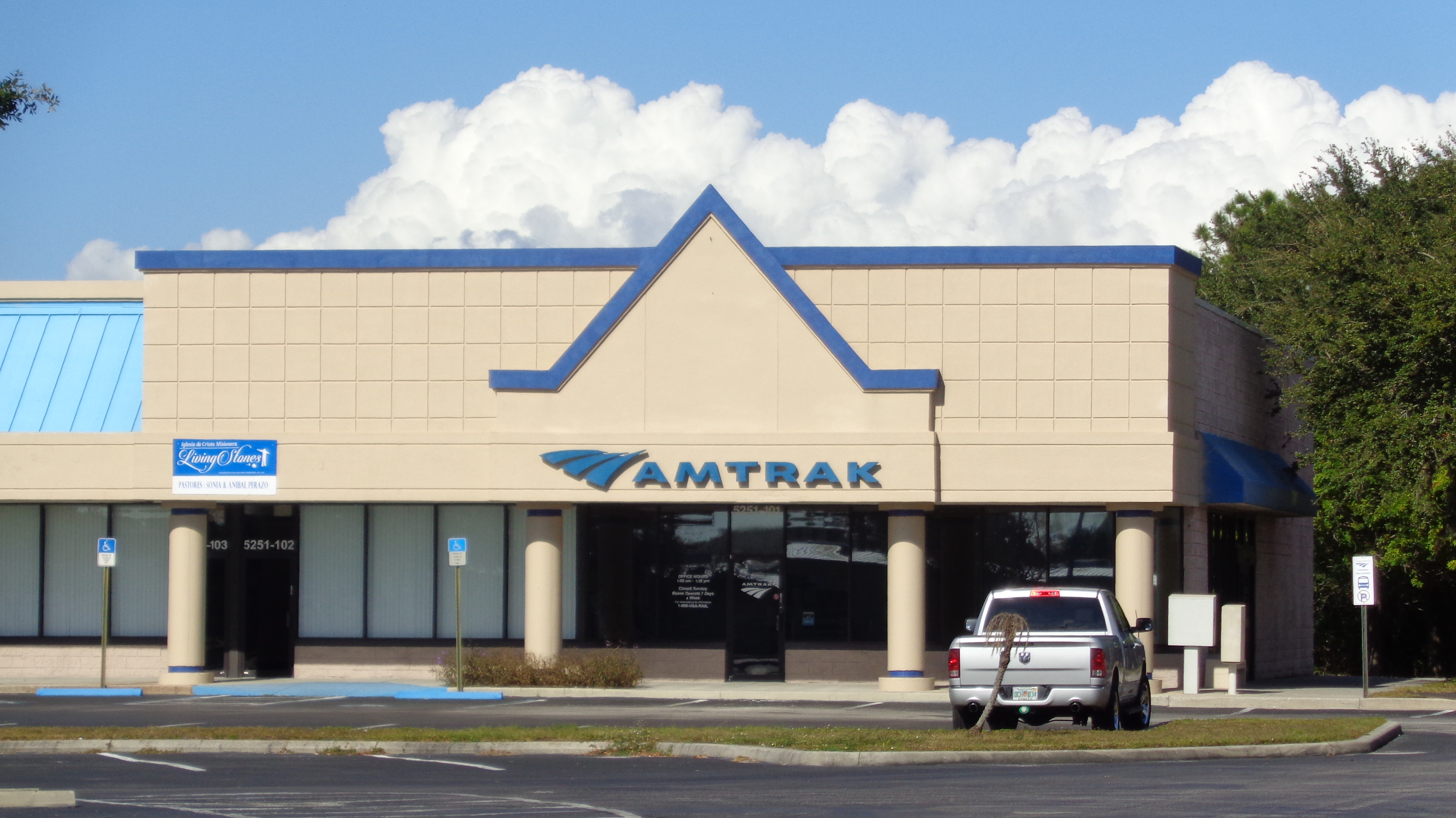
Amtrak continues to have a presence in Pinellas County through a bus station in Pinellas Park

The CSX railroad company operates the Clearwater Subdivision in Pinellas County, made up of segments of branch lines of the former Atlantic Coast Line Railroad and the Seaboard Air Line Railroad. Beginning in Tampa, the line has daily freight rail traffic through Oldsmar, Safety Harbor, Clearwater, Largo, Pinellas Park, and into St. Petersburg. Regularly scheduled passenger rail services in Pinellas County ended on February 1, 1984, when Amtrak discontinued its rail operations in the county, and the last passenger rail service in the county of any kind, a series of special excursion runs between Tarpon Springs and Dunedin, occurred on March 8, 1987. CSX owned the last remaining trackage in downtown St. Petersburg until March 2008 when it, along with the remaining trackage south of Central Avenue and east of 34th Street South, began to be dismantled. That right-of-way, as well as the right-of-way of several other former CSX railroad lines in the county beginning in the 1990s, was converted into a section of the Pinellas Trail.

In 2012, proposals began being developed by community leaders for a light rail system which would connect the regional core cities of Clearwater, St. Petersburg, and Tampa. The proposal, which won the backing of the Clearwater and St. Petersburg City Councils would have relied on a 1% sales tax. In a 2014 referendum, the proposal was soundly defeated, with only 38% of voters in favor of the plan

=== Mass transit ===
The Pinellas Suncoast Transit Authority (PSTA) operates 205 buses and trolleys servicing 37 routes across the county, with major stops at all commercial centers. Along the Gulf Beaches, PTSA operates the Suncoast Beach Trolley. PTSA also offers two express routes to downtown Tampa via the Howard Frankland and Gandy Bridges, connecting with Tampa's HartLine, and connects with Pasco's PCPT in Tarpon Springs to continue service in that county. The system's two main bus terminals are located in downtown Clearwater and downtown St. Petersburg. During fiscal year 2005–06, PSTA transported 11,400,484 passengers. Additionally, the city of St. Pete operates a rapid bus service, the SunRunner, from downtown St. Pete to St. Pete Beach.

== Emergency management ==
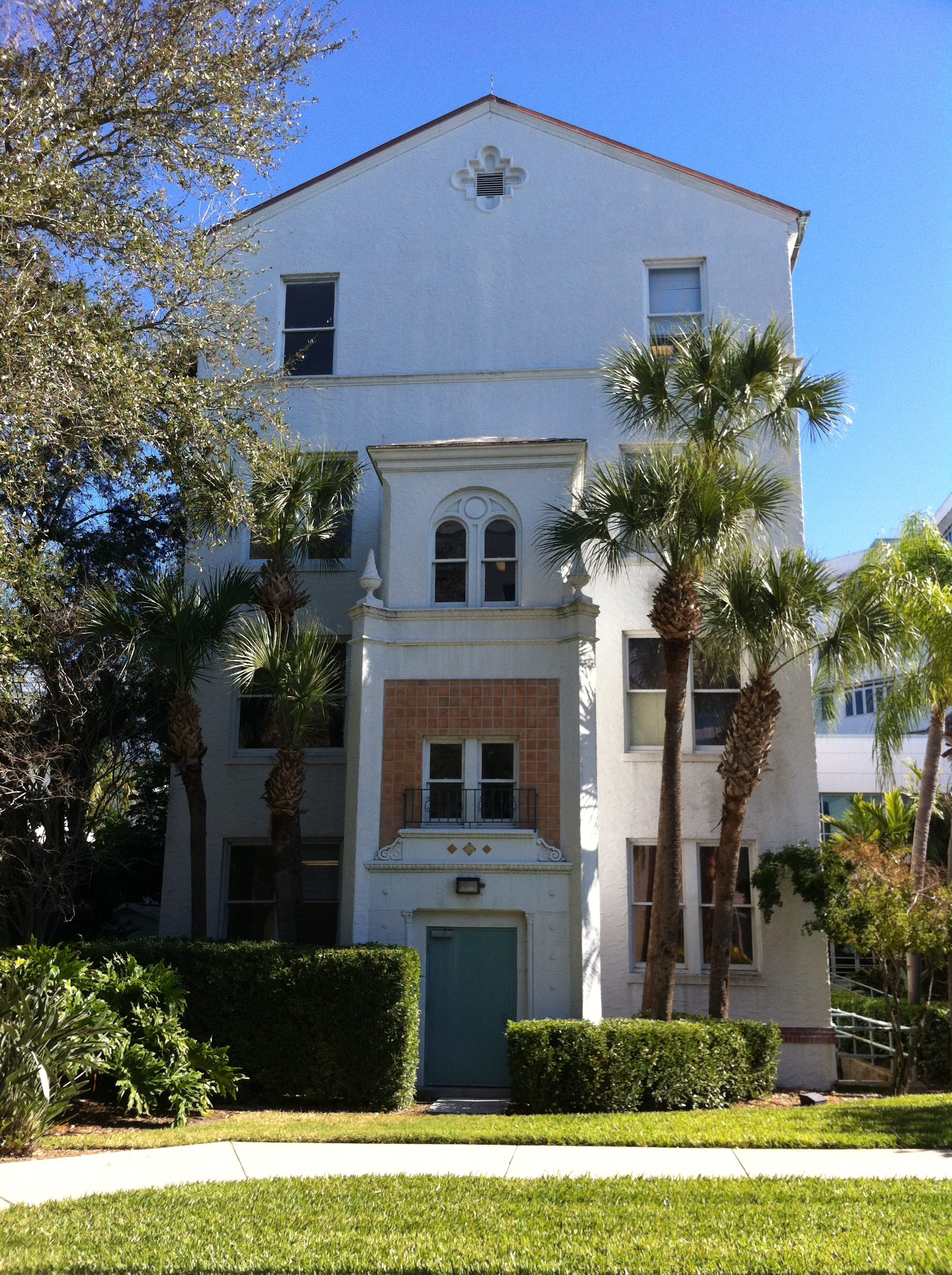
The original building of Mound Park Hospital in St. Petersburg, around which Bayfront Medical Center was built

=== Fire departments ===
- Clearwater Fire Rescue
- Dunedin Fire Rescue
- East Lake Fire Rescue
- Gulfport Fire Rescue
- Largo Fire Rescue
- Lealman Fire District
- Maderia Beach Fire Rescue
- Oldsmar Fire Rescue
- Palm Harbor Fire Rescue
- Pinellas Park Fire Rescue
- Pinellas Suncoast Fire District
- Safety Harbor Fire Rescue
- Seminole Fire Rescue
- St. Pete Beach Fire Rescue
- St. Petersburg Fire Rescue
- South Pasadena Fire Rescue
- Tarpon Springs Fire Rescue
- Treasure Island Fire Rescue

=== Emergency Medical Services ===
- Sunstar Paramedics

=== Law enforcement agencies ===
Pinellas County Sheriff's Office
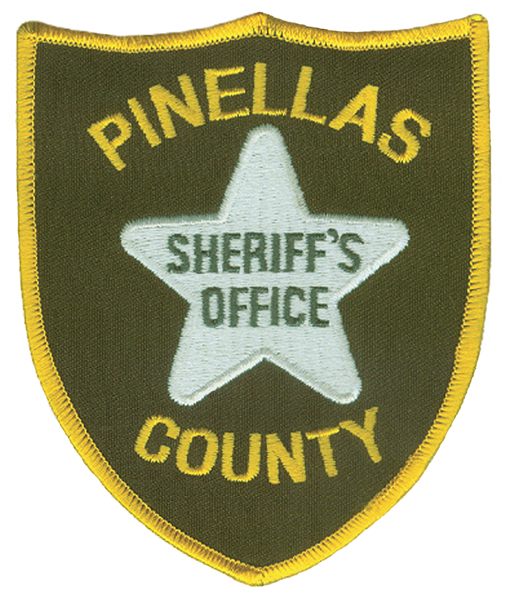
- Patch of the Pinellas County Sheriff's Office
- Abbreviation: PCSO

Agency overview
- Formed: 1912; 114 years ago

Jurisdictional structure
- General nature: Local civilian police

Operational structure
- Headquarters: Largo, Florida
- Agency executive: Bob Gualtieri (R), Sheriff

Website
- Pinellas County Sheriff's Office

The Pinellas County Sheriff's Office (PCSO) was founded in 1912 at the founding of the county. The Sheriff's Office absorbed the County Patrol in 1960. As of 2022 the sheriff is Bob Gualtieri.

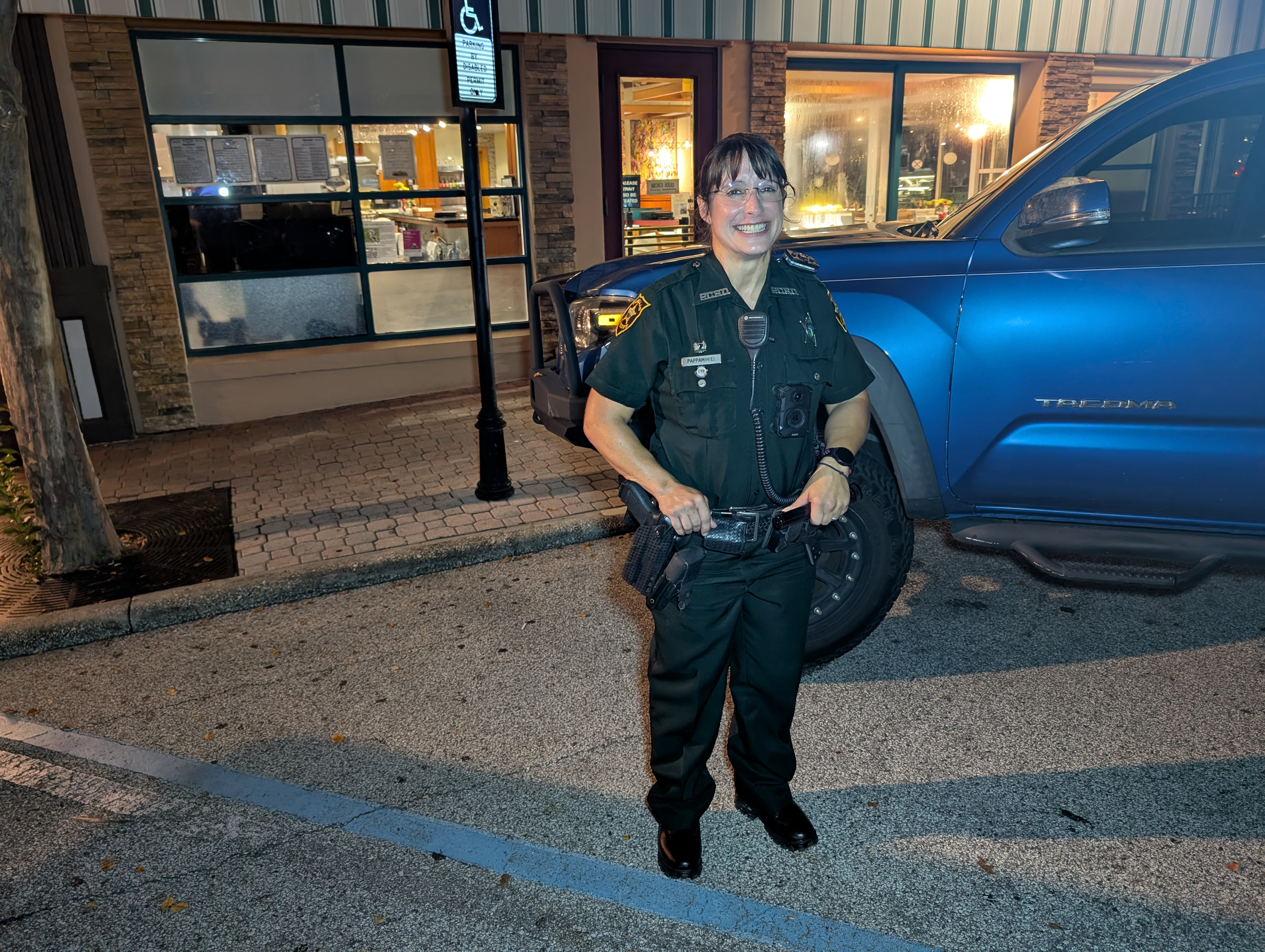
Community Deputy, Deputy Renee Pappahimiel on foot patrol in Downtown on a Friday night

The PCSO serves unincorporated areas of the county. These municipalities contract with the PCSO to be their primary law enforcement provider:

- Belleair Beach
- Belleair Bluffs
- Dunedin
- Indian Rocks Beach
- Madeira Beach
- North Redington Beach
- Oldsmar
- Redington Beach
- Safety Harbor
- Seminole
- South Pasadena
- St. Pete Beach

Many cities in the county have their own city police departments:

- Belleair Police Department
- Clearwater Police Department
- Gulfport Police Department
- Indian Shores Police Department
- Kenneth City Police Department
- Largo Police Department
- Pinellas Park Police Department
- St. Petersburg Police Department
- Tarpon Springs Police Department
- Treasure Island Police Department

=== Hospitals ===
There are several hospitals in Pinellas and the surrounding counties.

== Communities ==
Location of municipalities in Pinellas County as indicated by the list in this sections

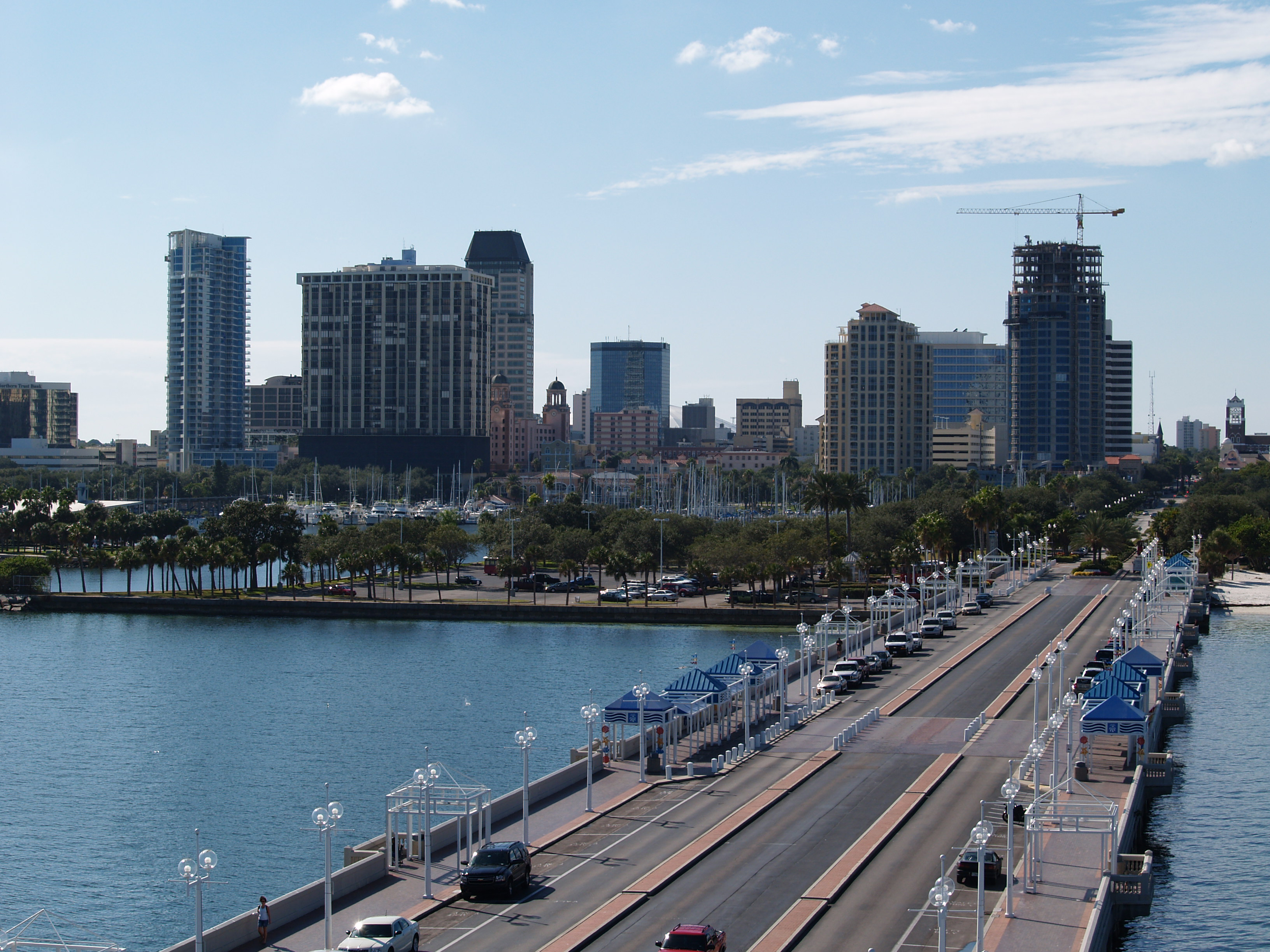
St. Petersburg skyline from the old Pier

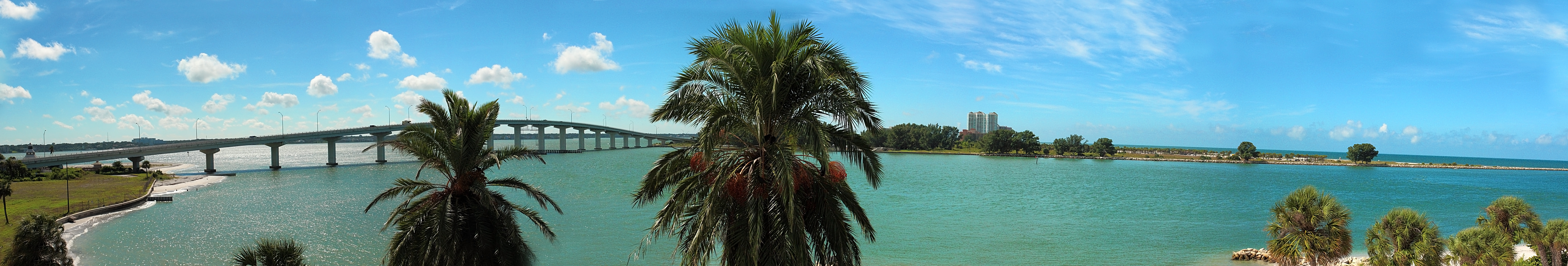
Clearwater pass from Clearwater Beach

=== Cities ===
- Belleair Beach (2)
- Belleair Bluffs (3)
- Clearwater (5)
- Dunedin (6)
- Gulfport (7)
- Indian Rocks Beach (8)
- Largo (11)
- Madeira Beach (12)
- Oldsmar (14)
- Pinellas Park (15)
- Safety Harbor (18)
- Seminole (19)
- South Pasadena (20)
- St. Pete Beach (21)
- St. Petersburg (22)
- Tarpon Springs (23)
- Treasure Island (24)

=== Towns ===
- Belleair (1)
- Belleair Shore (4)
- Indian Shores (9)
- Kenneth City (10)
- North Redington Beach (13)
- Redington Beach (16)
- Redington Shores (17)

=== Census-designated places ===
- Bardmoor
- Bay Pines
- Bear Creek
- East Lake
- Feather Sound
- Greenbriar
- Harbor Bluffs
- Lealman
- Palm Harbor
- Ridgecrest
- South Highpoint
- Tierra Verde
- West Lealman

=== Other unincorporated communities ===
- Baskin
- Crystal Beach
- Curlew
- Gandy
- Highpoint
- Oakhurst
- Ozona
- St. George
- Seminole Park
- Wall Springs
- Walsingham

== In popular culture ==
Movies filmed or set in Pinellas County include:

- Gifted (2017): Set in Pinellas County, with scenes in the Pinellas County Courthouse, but filmed in Chatham County, Georgia
- The Infiltrator (2016): Some scenes filmed at Derby Lane Greyhound Track and St. Pete Beach
- Sunlight Jr. (2013): Some shots filmed in Clearwater at the Floridian Inn at Gulf-to-Bay Boulevard.
- Spring Breakers (2013): Primarily filmed in Treasure Island, St. Pete Beach, and Gulfport.
- Magic Mike (2012): Set in Tampa, it was filmed in St. Petersburg, Treasure Island, and Ybor City alongside set filming in Los Angeles, California.
- Dolphin Tale (2011): Filmed and set at the Clearwater Marine Aquarium in Clearwater
- Immortal Island (2011)
- A Fonder Heart (2011): Scenes filmed in Clearwater
- Misconceptions (2008): Scenes filmed at Eckerd College in St. Petersburg
- Grace Is Gone (2007): Scenes filmed at Fort DeSoto Park in St. Petersburg
- Love Comes Lately (2007): Scenes filmed in the Pass A Grille neighborhood of St. Pete Beach
- Loren Cass (2006): Scenes filmed throughout St. Petersburg
- The Punisher (2004): Scenes filmed at Honeymoon Island State Park in Dunedin, Fort De Soto and the Sunshine Skyway Bridge at the mouth of Tampa Bay
- American Outlaws (2001): Scenes filmed at Fort DeSoto Park
- Ocean's Eleven (2001): Single scene filmed at the former Derby Lane Greyhound Track in St. Petersburg
- Great Expectations (1998): Scenes filmed at Fort DeSoto Park
- Lethal Weapon 3 (1992): scenes filmed at the former Soreno Hotel in St. Petersburg
- Cocoon (1985): Filmed and set in St. Petersburg
- Summer Rental (1985): Filmed in St. Pete Beach
- Once Upon a Time in America (1984): Scenes filmed at the Don CeSar hotel on St. Pete Beach
- Porky's (1982): Based on actual occurrences at Boca Ciega High School in Gulfport the early 1960s
- HealtH (1980): Filmed entirely at the Don CeSar hotel

== See also ==
- Community Service Foundation
- Robert J. Goldstein (2002)
- National Register of Historic Places listings in Pinellas County, Florida
- Timeline of Pinellas County, Florida history
- List of tallest buildings in St. Petersburg

== General and cited references ==
- Luisi, Vincent (2010), Railroading in Pinellas County (1st ed.), Arcadia Publishing, ISBN 978-0-7385-8550-5
