= Florida State Road 583 =

State highway in Florida, United States

State Road 583
- 56th Street

Route information
- Maintained by FDOT
- Length: 6.014 mi (9.679 km)

Major junctions
- South end: US 41 in Tampa
- US 92 in Temple Terrace
- North end: SR 582 in Temple Terrace

Location
- Country: United States
- State: Florida
- Counties: Hillsborough

Highway system
- Florida State Highway System; Interstate; US; State; Former; Pre‑1945; Toll; Scenic
← SR 582	→ SR 584

State Road 583 (SR 583) is a 6-mile-long (10 km), north–south highway that travels from Tampa to Temple Terrace in Hillsborough County, Florida.

== Route description ==
SR 583's southern terminus is at U.S. Route 41 (US 41) only 0.14 miles (0.23 km) away from an intersection with Interstate 4 in Tampa. The roadway then continues north passing over SR 574 before intersecting US 92 which provides easy access to US 301 which does not intersect SR 583. SR 583 then continues northward to Temple Terrace, Florida where it intersects the eastern terminus of State Road 580 and then terminates at SR 582 where the roadway continues north as 56th Street and County Road 583 (CR 583) to intersect CR 582A. SR 583 is also goes under the name of 56th Street for almost its entire duration.

== Major intersections ==
The entire route is in Hillsborough County.

Location	mi	km	Destinations	Notes
Tampa	0.000	0.000	US 41 (Melburne Boulevard / 50th Street / SR 599) to I-4	
Tampa	0.756	1.217	SR 574 (East Dr. Martin Luther King Jr. Boulevard) to US 41 north	
	1.990	3.203	US 92 (East Hillsborough Avenue / SR 600) to I-4 east – Tampa, Plant City	
Temple Terrace	4.499	7.240	SR 580 west (Busch Boulevard) / CR 580 east (Bullard Parkway) to I-275 – Busch Gardens	
Temple Terrace	6.014	9.679	SR 582 (Fowler Avenue) to I-75 / North 56th Street (CR 583 north)	
1.000 mi = 1.609 km; 1.000 km = 0.621 mi
