= Florida State Road 688 =

State highway in Florida, United States

State Road 688

Route information
- Maintained by FDOT
- Length: 12.913 mi (20.781 km)

Major junctions
- West end: SR 699 in Indian Rocks Beach
- US 19 Alt. in Largo; US 19 near Largo; SR 686A in Clearwater
- East end: I-275 in St. Petersburg

Location
- Country: United States
- State: Florida
- Counties: Pinellas

Highway system
- Florida State Highway System; Interstate; US; State; Former; Pre‑1945; Toll; Scenic
← SR 687	→ SR 690

State Road 688 (SR 688) is an east–west route in Pinellas County running from Indian Rocks Beach to northeastern St. Petersburg, Florida, where it merges onto Interstate 275 (I-275).

== Route description ==
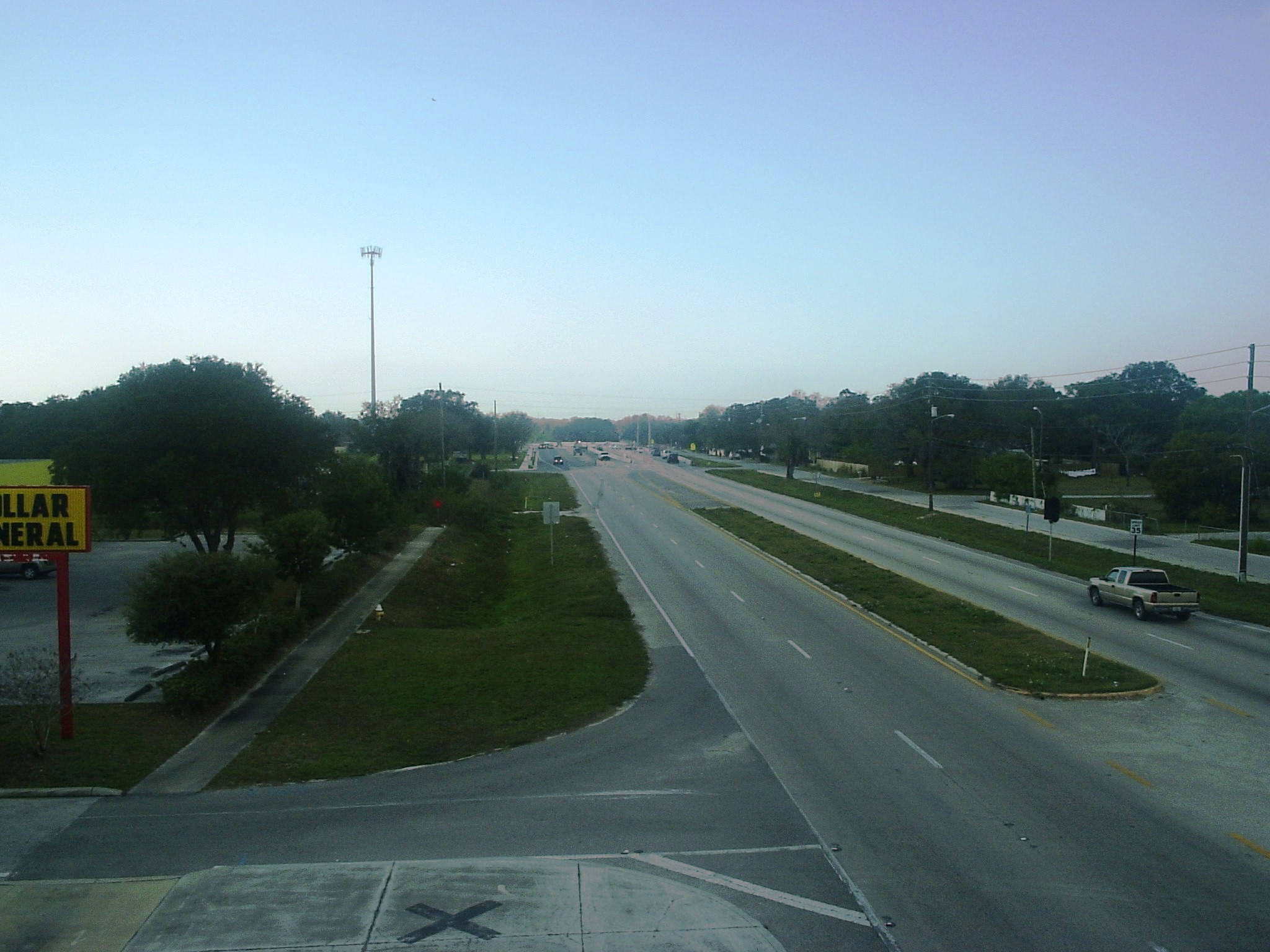
Looking west from the Pinellas Trail bridge over Ulmerton Road

The highway changes its name as it heads east across Pinellas County. From Gulf Boulevard in Indian Rocks Beach, it runs along 5th Avenue and crosses the bridge over the Intracoastal Waterway as the Indian Rocks Causeway. Once off the causeway, it becomes Walsingham Road and runs on to the intersection of Walsingham and Ulmerton Roads. Walsingham continues east, but State Road 688 loops north and then east on Ulmerton Road. It skirts Largo before crossing U.S. Route 19 (US 19) and then merges briefly with Roosevelt Boulevard (SR 686). It continues into northeast St. Petersburg and its traffic merges with I-275.

== History ==
Ulmerton Road was named for the community of Ulmers, which arose around Marion Ulmer's turpentine still, timber and naval stores interests in the first half of the twentieth century. In the 1950s, the area was very rural, and cattle were driven along the then dirt road. Today it carries traffic across the middle of the most densely populated county in Florida.

== Major intersections ==
The entire route is in Pinellas County.

Location	mi	km	Destinations	Notes
Indian Rocks Beach	0.000	0.000	SR 699 south / CR 183 north (Gulf Boulevard) – Indian Shores, Belleair Shore	
Indian Rocks Beach; Largo	0.283– 0.370	0.455– 0.595	Indian Rocks Causeway over The Narrows (Gulf Intracoastal Waterway)	
Largo	0.693	1.115	CR 213 south (Hamlin Boulevard)	
Largo	1.192	1.918	CR 233 (Indian Rocks Road / Oakhurst Road) – Belleair Bluffs, Seminole	
Largo	1.948	3.135	Vonn Road / 131st Street (CR 263)	
	2.250	3.621	Walsingham Road (CR 330 east) - Botanical Gardens, Heritage Village, Museum of Art	
Largo	3.914	6.299	Ridge Road (CR 313 south)	
Largo	4.035	6.494	CR 321 (Ridge Road / 113th Street)	
Largo	4.545	7.314	US 19 Alt. (Seminole Boulevard / SR 595) – Largo, Seminole	
	5.541	8.917	Lake Avenue Southeast	
Largo	6.053	9.741	CR 1 (Starkey Road)	
Largo	7.072	11.381	Belcher Road (CR 501)	
Largo	8.114	13.058	SR 693 (66th Street) – Clearwater, Pinellas Park	
	8.457– 8.546	13.610– 13.753	US 19 (SR 55) – Clearwater, Pinellas Park, St. Petersburg	
	8.604	13.847	62nd Street North (CR 563)	
Pinellas Park	9.851	15.854	49th Street North (CR 611)	
Pinellas Park	10.325– 10.403	16.616– 16.742	SR 686 west (Roosevelt Boulevard) / SR 686A – Largo, Clearwater	West end of SR 686 overlap; no access from SR 688 east to SR 686 west; no access from SR 688 west to SR 686A south
St. Petersburg	11.137– 11.570	17.923– 18.620	SR 686 east (Roosevelt Boulevard) to I-275 south – St. Petersburg	Interchange; east end of SR 686 overlap
St. Petersburg	12.913	20.781	I-275 (SR 93) / Martin Luther King Jr. Street (CR 803 south) – Tampa, Bradenton	I-275 exit 31; no access from I-275 north or CR 803 north to SR 688 west
1.000 mi = 1.609 km; 1.000 km = 0.621 mi: Concurrency terminus
