= Florida State Road 687 =

State highway in Florida, United States

State Road 687
- 4th Street
- SR 687 highlighted in red

Route information
- Maintained by FDOT
- Length: 9.446 mi (15.202 km)
- Existed: 1945–present

Major junctions
- South end: I-175 / SR 594 in St. Petersburg
- US 92 / US 19 Alt. / SR 595 in St. Petersburg
- North end: I-275 in St. Petersburg

Location
- Country: United States
- State: Florida
- Counties: Pinellas

Highway system
- Florida State Highway System; Interstate; US; State; Former; Pre‑1945; Toll; Scenic
← SR 686A	→ SR 688

State Road 687 (SR 687) is a north–south state road located solely within the borders of St. Petersburg, Florida. The road runs from Interstate 175 north to Interstate 375 along both 3rd Street and 4th Street. 3rd Street in a one-way route traveling northbound and 4th street is a one-way route traveling southbound. The intersections included on SR 687 on both 3rd Street and 4th Street extend between 5th Ave S and 5th Ave N in downtown St. Petersburg. North of I-375, the route runs partly concurrent with US 92 until the intersection with SR 693/SR 686/unsigned SR 600 intersection in northeast St. Petersburg and continues along 4th Street until terminating with northbound only Interstate 275 at Exit 32.

== Major intersections ==
The entire route is in St. Petersburg, Pinellas County.

mi	km	Destinations	Notes
0.000	0.000	SR 594 east (Dali Boulevard South / 5th Avenue South)	
0.018	0.029	I-175 west (South Bay Drive) / SR 594 west to I-275 – Tampa, Bradenton	
0.377	0.607	CR 150 west (Central Avenue)	
0.895	1.440	US 19 Alt. north (5th Avenue North / SR 595) to I-275 / I-375 / SR 592	south end of US 92 overlap
see US 92 (mile 0.000-5.998)
6.893	11.093	US 92 east / SR 694 west (Gandy Boulevard / SR 600 east) / SR 686 west (Roosevelt Boulevard) to I-275 south – Pinellas Park, Tampa, Dog Track	north end of US 92 overlap
9.446	15.202	I-275 north (SR 93)	Exit 32 (I-275)
1.000 mi = 1.609 km; 1.000 km = 0.621 mi: Concurrency terminus
