= Florida State Road 651 =

Highway in Florida

State Road 651

Route information
- Maintained by FDOT
- Length: 3.798 mi (6.112 km)

Major junctions
- South end: US 19 Alt. / SR 686 in Largo
- North end: SR 60 / CR 375 in Clearwater

Location
- Country: United States
- State: Florida
- Counties: Pinellas

Highway system
- Florida State Highway System; Interstate; US; State; Former; Pre‑1945; Toll; Scenic
← SR 636	→ SR 655

State Road 651 (SR 651) is a 3.798-mile-long (6.112 km) state highway in Pinellas County, Florida, that runs from U.S. Route 19 Alternate and Florida State Road 686 in southern Largo to Florida State Road 60 and County Road 375 in Clearwater. It is unsigned throughout, running concurrent with U.S. Route 19 Alternate for the first 3.041 miles (4.894 km), then with Florida State Road 60 until its terminus.

== Major intersections ==
The entire route is in Pinellas County.

Location	mi	km	Destinations	Notes
Largo	0.000	0.000	US 19 Alt. south (Seminole Boulevard / SR 595 south) / SR 686 (Bay Drive)	Southern terminus; southern end of US 19 Alt. concurrency; continues as US 19 Alt. beyond SR 686
see U.S. Route 19 Alt. (see mile 17.066-20.107)
Clearwater	3.041	4.894	US 19 Alt. north / SR 60 west (Court Street / SR 595 north) / South Missouri Avenue	Northern end of US 19 Alt. concurrency; southern end of SR 60 concurrency
see SR 60 (mile 2.725-3.482)
Clearwater	3.798	6.112	SR 60 (Gulf to Bay Boulevard) / South Highland Avenue (CR 375) / Gulf to Bay Boulevard	Northern terminus; northern end of SR 60 concurrency; continues beyond South Highland Avenue as SR 60
1.000 mi = 1.609 km; 1.000 km = 0.621 mi
