= Florida State Road 582 =

State highway in Florida, United States

State Road 582
- Fowler Avenue

Route information
- Maintained by FDOT
- Length: 7.829 mi (12.600 km)

Major junctions
- West end: US 41 Bus. in Tampa
- I-275 in Tampa; US 41 in Tampa; I-75 in Temple Terrace
- East end: US 301 near Thonotosassa

Location
- Country: United States
- State: Florida

Highway system
- Florida State Highway System; Interstate; US; State; Former; Pre‑1945; Toll; Scenic
← SR 581	→ SR 583

State Road 582 (SR 582) is an east–west state highway in Hillsborough County, Florida, United States. The current alignment of SR 582 is Fowler Avenue just south of the northern city limit of Tampa and Temple Terrace from Florida Avenue (U.S. Route 41 Business (US 41 Bus.)/SR 685) to US 301 (SR 41). It is the primary road to access of University of South Florida (50th Street, the former State Road 582B and now County Road 582B, forms the eastern boundary of the campus; Fletcher Avenue, the former State Road 582A that was once a segment of SR 579, forms the northern boundary).

The road is named after Tampa civil rights activist Cody Fowler's mother Maud Fowler.

== Route description ==
Motorists overshooting the western terminus of SR 582 travel westward along Country Club Drive 1.4 miles (2.3 km) to a T-intersection with Armenia Avenue on the western Tampa city limit, near Carrollwood; travelers overshooting the eastern terminus of SR 582 follow US 301/SR 41 near Clarkwild and toward Thonotosassa, where County Road 582 continues eastward (on Knights-Griffin Road) toward Lakeland.

=== Lane configurations ===
- Between eastern terminus and Bruce B. Downs Boulevard (3 lanes each way)
- Between Bruce B. Downs Boulevard and U.S. Route 41/Nebraska Avenue (4 lanes each way)
- Between U.S. Route 41 and Interstate 275 (3 lanes plus turn lanes each way)
- Between Interstate 275 and western terminus (2 lanes each way)

== Major intersections ==
The entire route is in Hillsborough County.

Location	mi	km	Destinations	Notes
Tampa	0.000	0.000	US 41 Bus. (North Florida Avenue / SR 685)	Western terminus; roadway continues west as Country Club Drive
Tampa	0.282	0.454	I-275 (SR 93) – Ocala, St. Petersburg	Exit 51 on I-275
Tampa	0.505	0.813	US 41 (Nebraska Avenue / SR 45)	
Tampa	2.036	3.277	CR 581 (Bruce B. Downs Boulevard / North 30th Street) - Veterans Hospital	
Tampa	2.642	4.252	CR 585A south (McKinley Drive) – Busch Gardens, Adventure Island	
Tampa	3.529	5.679	North 50th Street (CR 582B north)	
Temple Terrace	4.019	6.468	SR 583 south (North 56th Street) / CR 583 north	Northern terminus of SR 583; Southern terminus of CR 583
Temple Terrace	6.47	10.41	I-75 (SR 93A) – Ocala, Naples	Exit 265 on I-75
	7.829	12.600	US 301 (SR 41) to I-4 – Zephyrhills, Riverview	Eastern terminus
1.000 mi = 1.609 km; 1.000 km = 0.621 mi

== History ==
SR 582 formerly extended west to Tarpon Springs and east to Lakeland. A stretch of former SR 582 (locally known as Tarpon Avenue) between US 19 and Alternate US 19 in Tarpon Springs is now Pinellas County Road 582. A stretch of former SR 582 between Thonotosassa and State Road 33 in Lakeland is now Hillsborough County Road 582 to the county line and Polk County Road 582 east of the county line.

== Sources ==
- MapSource Street Atlas of Pinellas County
- MapSource Street Atlas of Hillsborough County
- Various other road maps
