= Gateway, Pinellas County, Florida =

Coordinates: 27.8442054°N 82.6508583°W

Gateway, also called the "Gateway area", or "Gateway District", is a 30-square-mile (78 km^{2}) major business district of Pinellas County, Florida, United States. As it is a major employment center located in an area of suburban density, it is considered an edge city. As of 2019, an increase in construction of residential complexes indicate that Gateway is turning into a mixed business and residential area.

== Location ==
The Gateway/Mid-County Planning area falls within the city limits of St. Petersburg and Pinellas Park, along U.S. Route 92 and Interstate 275 at the west end of the Howard Frankland Bridge. It is bordered by:

- U.S. Route 19 and Starkey Road on the west
- 62nd Avenue North and Gandy Boulevard on the south
- Tampa Bay on the north and east

== Economy ==
The district is home to 2,700 businesses and 60,000 employees, including at several of the Tampa Bay area's largest employers are located in Gateway including Raymond James Financial, Home Shopping Network, and Jabil. Since 2014, major companies including Valpak, Maxi-Blast, AGR Florida, and Great Bay Distributors have relocated or expanded their existing offices and facilities in Gateway. Planning and promotion of Gateway is managed by the Gateway Business Council.

=== Retail ===
Retail lines U.S. Route 92 and adjacent streets. Complexes include Gateway Market Center anchored by Target, Publix, and PetSmart, and Gateway Crossings anchored by Publix.

== Residential ==
Newer mixed-use and residential projects include Ibis Walk and Peridot Palms.

== Infrastructure ==
Two elevated roadways and toll lanes are under construction.

- Elevated north-south toll road paralleling 49th St. N., from the Bayside Bridge, along the west edge of the airport, to the new east-west toll road
- Elevated east-west toll road parallel to 118th Ave. N., from the junction with U.S. Route 19 in the west to the junction with I-275 in the east
- Express lanes on I-275 from the Frankland bridge to south of Gandy Blvd.
