= Florida State Road 590 =

State highway in Florida, United States

State Road 590

Route information
- Maintained by FDOT
- Length: 8.154 mi (13.123 km)

Major junctions
- West end: US 19 Alt. in Clearwater
- US 19 in Clearwater
- East end: SR 580 in Safety Harbor

Location
- Country: United States
- State: Florida
- Counties: Pinellas

Highway system
- Florida State Highway System; Interstate; US; State; Former; Pre‑1945; Toll; Scenic
← SR 589	→ SR 592

State Road 590 (SR 590) is an east–west commercial and commuter highway serving central Pinellas County, within Clearwater and Safety Harbor. It runs from Alt US 19 in Clearwater east to State Road 580 in Safety Harbor, and is a scenic route in much of Safety Harbor.

== Route description ==
State Road 590 begins at US Alternate Route 19 in Clearwater, just as it did before US Alternate 19 was realigned during the early 21st Century. Throughout most of Clearwater, SR 590 runs along Drew Street, a four-lane undivided highway with few if any provisions for left-turns. Between North Betty Lane and North Hillcrest Avenue, it runs along the south edge of the Clearwater Country Club The few intersections where the road divides is at CR 1 (North Keene Road), a major north-south county road that spans from St. Petersburg to Palm Harbor. After this the road runs Just south of the Clearwater Air Park. The road divides once again at the intersection with Hercules Avenue (unmarked CR 425), and after this SR 590 shifts onto Northeast Coachman Road, while the rest of Drew Street continues east becoming an undivided highway as it heads toward BayCare Ballpark.

Along Northeast Coachman Road, SR 590 runs northeast as it intersects another major county road known as CR 501 (Belcher Road), which runs from Gulfport to Tarpon Springs. A less important but nevertheless unique intersection within some preserved land along Alligator Creek is with Old Coachman Road (unmarked CR 535), since it also includes a railroad crossing for the CSX Clearwater Subdivision, and the Ream Wilson Trail. Leaving the preserved land, the road is surrounded by residential development once again and then becomes a divided highway as it approaches a power-line right-of-way and later the U.S. Route 19 in Florida interchange. It then turns straight west and east again, passing by neighborhoods such as Orange Blossom Estates and Mission Hills until it divides again as it approaches County Road 611 (McMullen-Booth Road), a county road that's almost as heavily traveled as US 19. From there the road enters Safety Harbor, Florida as Tenth Street South and narrows down to two lanes. Tenth Street makes a sharp left turn before reaching the Clearwater Subdivision again and becomes South 14th Street, then curves to the right again and becomes Fourth Street South. At the intersection with Tenth Avenue, SR 590 turns north again, and three blocks later intersects Main Street(CR 576), where it turns right, thus serving as the terminus of CR 576. SR 590 then crosses the Clearwater Subdivision again, the same railroad line it tried to avoid as Tenth Street and Fourth Street. At the end of Main Street, SR 590 turns north onto Philippe Parkway, a road that begins a block south at South Bayshore Boulevard and the City Marina, then runs close to the west shore of Old Tampa Bay.

North of the blinker-light intersections with Washington Drive and Grand Central Avenue, the road becomes a two-lane divided highway, except at the intersections of Marshall and Salem Streets, and Irwin Street, where the divider is interrupted to provide left-turn lanes. The divider is interrupted again between Parkside Lane and Avon Drive, and ends permanently shortly after the previously mentioned intersection. It is revived again after Pinellas Avenue, but does not extend to CR 102 (Enterprise Road East). Just north of here is the entrance to Philippe Park, the park for which this section of 590 is named. It then turns to the northwest at the broken alignment of Philippe Park Drive running much closer to the coast of Safety Harbor itself. After passing by a few more developments, SR 590 enters the Bridgeport section of Safety Harbor. It moves west off of Philippe Parkway as it crosses the Clearwater Subdivision for the last time as it divides the Bridgeport and La Playa Estates sections of Safety Harbor and then turns north to finally terminate at State Road 580 just west of the bridges over the Tarpon Canal and Moccasin Creek leading to Oldsmar, Florida.

== Major intersections ==
The entire route is in Pinellas County.

Location	mi	km	Destinations	Notes
Clearwater	0.000	0.000	US 19 Alt. (Myrtle Avenue / SR 595)	Western terminus
Clearwater	0.753	1.212	CR 355 north (Betty Lane)	
Clearwater	2.000	3.219	CR 1 (Keene Road)	
Clearwater	2.529	4.070	Hercules Avenue (CR 425)	
Clearwater	2.648	4.262	CR 528 east (Drew Street)	no left turn westbound
Clearwater	3.132	5.040	Belcher Road (CR 501)	
Clearwater	4.341– 4.396	6.986– 7.075	US 19 (SR 55) – Tarpon Springs, Pinellas Park, St. Petersburg	Interchange
Clearwater–Safety Harbor line	5.637	9.072	CR 611 (McMullen Booth Road)	
Safety Harbor	6.803	10.948	Delaware Street	East end of state maintenance
Safety Harbor	Gap in route			
Safety Harbor	9.024	14.523	Enterprise Road (CR 638 west)	West end of state maintenance
Safety Harbor	10.375	16.697	SR 580 – Dunedin, Oldsmar	Eastern terminus
1.000 mi = 1.609 km; 1.000 km = 0.621 mi

== Former State Road 590A ==
State Road 590A
- Location: Clearwater
- Length: 1.732 mi (2.787 km)
- Existed: 1976–by 1983

State Road 590A (SR 590A) was a former suffixed alternate route of SR 590 along Coachman Road between Drew Street and US 19. At the time of its designation, SR 590 continued east along Drew Street. Established in January 1976, it was replaced by 1983 as a part of SR 590.
