= I-175 =

I-175 may refer to:

- Interstate 175, an Interstate highway in Florida
- Interstate 175 (Georgia), a cancelled Interstate highway
- Interstate 175 (Kentucky-Tennessee), a proposed Interstate highway
- Japanese submarine I-175, a submarine operated by the Imperial Japanese Navy
