= Florida State Road 580 =

State highway in Florida, United States

State Road 580

Route information
- Maintained by FDOT
- Length: 28.779 mi (46.315 km)

Major junctions
- West end: US 19 Alt. in Dunedin
- US 19 in Clearwater; SR 590 in Safety Harbor; SR 584 in Oldsmar; US 92 in Tampa; I-275 in Tampa; US 41 in Tampa
- East end: SR 583 in Temple Terrace

Location
- Country: United States
- State: Florida
- Counties: Pinellas, Hillsborough

Highway system
- Florida State Highway System; Interstate; US; State; Former; Pre‑1945; Toll; Scenic
| ← SR 579 | → SR 581 |

State Road 580 (SR 580) is a major commercial and commuter route serving northern Pinellas and central Hillsborough County, Florida, The western terminus is an intersection with Broadway Street (U.S. Route 19 Alternate (US 19 Alt.)-SR 595 in Dunedin); the current eastern terminus is an intersection with 56th Street (SR 583) next to the campuses of Florida College and Florida Christian College in northeastern Tampa. The historical eastern terminus is an intersection with US 301-SR 43 near Temple Terrace, two miles (3 km) to the east.

== Route description ==
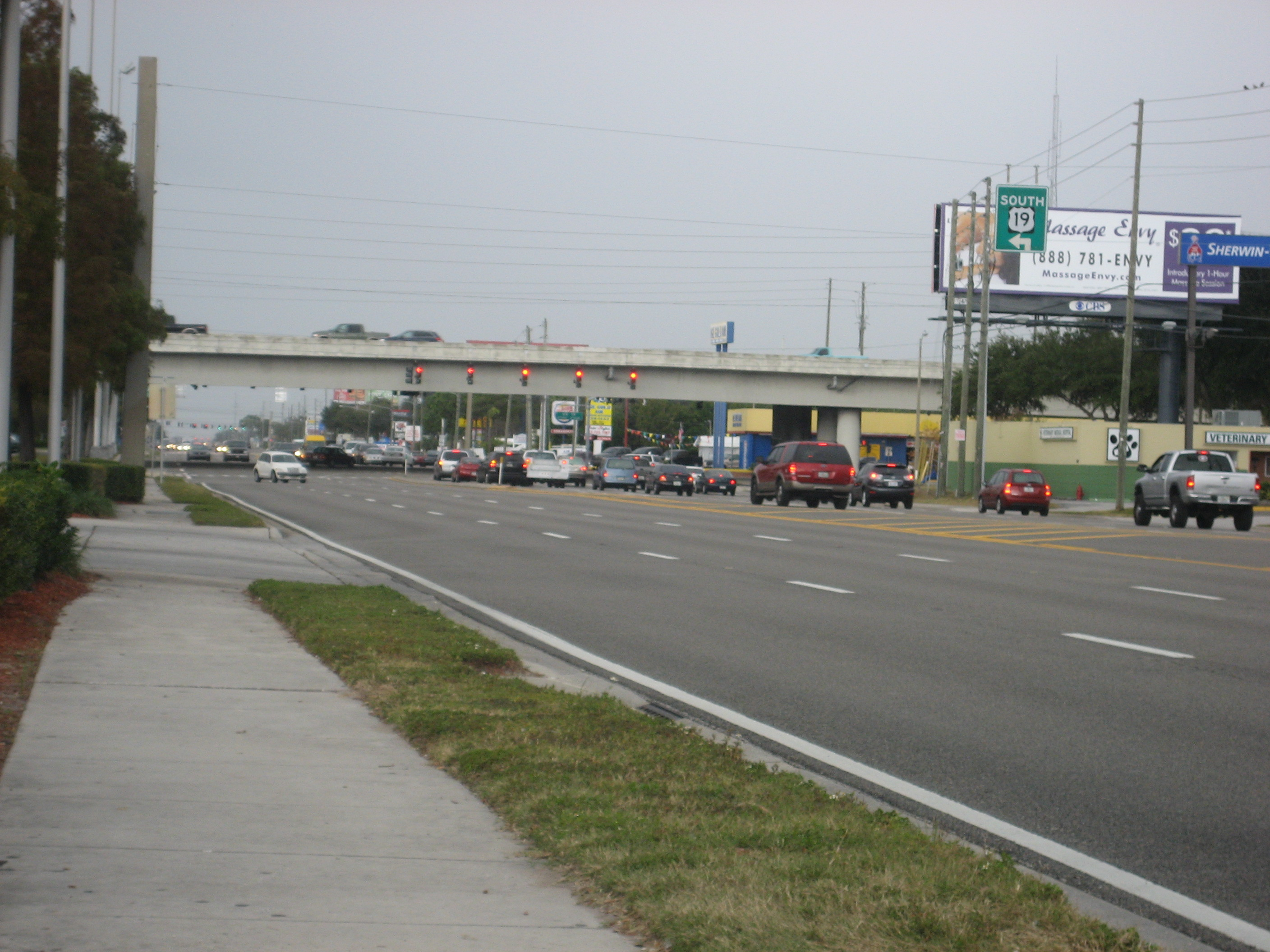
Looking west on SR 580 approaching US 19

The heavily traveled SR 580 is locally known by a variety of names. In Pinellas County (Dunedin, Safety Harbor, and Oldsmar) it is Skinner Boulevard, Main Street and Tampa Road. A motorist continuing eastward on SR 580 in Hillsborough County drives on Tampa Road, Hillsborough Avenue (through Town 'n' Country), Dale Mabry Highway (between US 92-SR 600 and SR 597), and Busch Boulevard (which continues past the eastern SR 580 terminus as Bullard Parkway).

Noteworthy sites along or near SR 580 include Countryside Mall, Trinity College, Tampa International Airport, Hillsborough Community College, Raymond James Stadium, Busch Gardens Tampa Bay, and the two colleges on the State Road's eastern terminus. SR 580 crosses Safety Harbor - the northwestern tip of Old Tampa Bay − at the SR 580 Bridge between Oldsmar and Safety Harbor.

== Major intersections ==
| County | Location | mi | km | Destinations | Notes |
|---|---|---|---|---|---|
| Pinellas | Dunedin | 0.000 | 0.000 | US 19 Alt. (Broadway / SR 595) – Clearwater, Tarpon Springs | |
| Pinellas | Dunedin | 0.479 | 0.771 | Main Street - Downtown Dunedin | former SR 580 west |
| Pinellas | Dunedin | 1.658 | 2.668 | CR 1 (Keene Road) | |
| Pinellas | Dunedin | 2.676 | 4.307 | CR 501 (Belcher Road) | |
| Pinellas | Clearwater | 3.210 | 5.166 | US 19 (SR 55) – Tarpon Springs, Clearwater, St. Petersburg | interchange |
| Pinellas | Clearwater | 5.109 | 8.222 | CR 611 (McMullen Booth Road) | |
| Pinellas | Safety Harbor | 6.030 | 9.704 | SR 590 south (Philippe Parkway) – Safety Harbor | |
| Pinellas | Oldsmar | 7.247 | 11.663 | Forest Lakes Boulevard (CR 667 north) / St. Petersburg Drive | former SR 580A east |
| Pinellas | Oldsmar | 8.380 | 13.486 | SR 584 west (Tampa Road) | westbound exit and eastbound entrance |
| Pinellas | Oldsmar | 8.699 | 14.000 | St. Petersburg Drive | former SR 580A west |
| Hillsborough | Town 'n' Country | 14.068 | 22.640 | Sheldon Road (CR 589 north) / Memorial Highway (CR 576 east) - A La Carte Pavilion | |
| Hillsborough | Town 'n' Country | 16.26 | 26.17 | SR 589 (Veterans Expressway) to I-275 / Eisenhower Boulevard – Tampa International Airport | SR 589 exit 4 |
| Hillsborough | Tampa | 18.96 | 30.51 | US 92 (Dale Mabry Highway south / Hillsborough Avenue east / SR 600) to I-275 – Raymond James Stadium | interchange |
| Hillsborough | | 19.728 | 31.749 | Lambright Street (CR 598 east) - Lowry Park Zoo | |
| Hillsborough | | 20.988 | 33.777 | To SR 589 (Veterans Expressway) / West Waters Avenue (CR 584 west / CR 587A east) | |
| Hillsborough | | 21.75 | 35.00 | SR 597 north (Dale Mabry Highway) / CR 587 west (Gunn Highway) – Citrus Park, Land o' Lakes | interchange |
| Hillsborough | Tampa | 24.733 | 39.804 | US 41 Bus. (North Florida Avenue / SR 685) | |
| Hillsborough | Tampa | 25.01 | 40.25 | I-275 (SR 93) – St. Petersburg, Ocala | Exit 50 (I-275) |
| Hillsborough | Tampa | 25.236 | 40.613 | US 41 (Nebraska Avenue / SR 45) – Dog Track | |
| Hillsborough | Tampa | 26.763 | 43.071 | North 30th Street (CR 581 north) | |
| Hillsborough | Tampa | 27.377 | 44.059 | CR 585A north (McKinley Drive) - Busch Gardens, Adventure Island | |
| Hillsborough | Temple Terrace | 28.779 | 46.315 | SR 583 (North 56th Street) / CR 580 east (Bullard Parkway) to I-4 | |
1.000 mi = 1.609 km; 1.000 km = 0.621 mi

== State Road 580A ==
State Road 580A
- Location: Oldsmar
- Existed: Late-1990's–?

State Road 580A (SR 580A) is both West Saint Petersburg and East Saint Petersburg Drive, a former segment of SR 580 in Oldsmar, Florida. The road begins at the intersection of SR 580 and County Road 233. Most of the road runs halfway between SR 580 and the north shore of Safety Harbor. The east end is at SR 580 between SR 584 and Race Track Road.

The road was established during a realignment of SR 580 in Oldsmar during the mid-to-late-1990's.
