= Florida State Road 586 =

State highway in Florida, United States

State Road 586
- Curlew Road
- SR 586 in red, CR 586 in blue

Route information
- Maintained by FDOT
- Length: 5.332 mi (8.581 km)

Major junctions
- West end: US 19 Alt. in Dunedin
- US 19 in Clearwater
- East end: SR 584 in Oldsmar

Location
- Country: United States
- State: Florida
- Counties: Pinellas

Highway system
- Florida State Highway System; Interstate; US; State; Former; Pre‑1945; Toll; Scenic
← SR 585	→ SR 589

State Road 586, also known as Curlew Road, is a state highway in the U.S. state of Florida. A five-mile-long east–west street serving northern Pinellas County, it currently extends from an intersection with Bayshore Boulevard (U.S. Route 19 Alternate (US 19 Alt.) and SR 595) in Dunedin eastward to an intersection with Tampa Road (SR 584 to the southeast, CR 752 - a former alignment of SR 584 - to the northwest) in Oldsmar.

Curlew Road continues west as Causeway Boulevard (CR 586), which crosses Pope Channel (and the Intracoastal Waterway) and ends at the entrance to Honeymoon Island State Park. A continuation to the east (after a slight turn to the east-southeast) puts motorists on Tampa Road, which is SR 584 at the turn and becomes SR 580 two miles (3 km) afterward.

== Route description ==
SR 586 begins at an intersection with US 19 Alt./SR 595 in Dunedin, Pinellas County, heading east on Curlew Road, a divided highway with two westbound lanes and one eastbound lane. Past the western terminus, the road continues as Causeway Boulevard, which heads to Honeymoon Island State Park. From the western terminus, the road heads into residential areas with some woods as a three-lane road with a center left-turn lane. SR 586 becomes a four-lane divided highway and crosses CR 1 and becomes the border between Palm Harbor to the north and Dunedin to the south. The highway continues along the southern border of Palm Harbor and intersects CR 501. Following this, the road heads into an area of businesses and widens to six lanes as it comes to a junction with US 19/SR 55. Past here, SR 586 continues back into residential neighborhoods and becomes the border between Palm Harbor to the north and Clearwater to the south. The road intersects the southern terminus of CR 90 and passes through less dense areas of development prior to an intersection with CR 611. After this junction, the highway comes to a bridge over Lake Tarpon Canal, at which point it enters Oldsmar. SR 586 passes a shopping center to the north and homes to the south before it comes to its eastern terminus at an intersection with Tampa Road, which heads northwest as CR 752 and southwest as SR 584.

== Major intersections ==
The entire route is in Pinellas County.

Location	mi	km	Destinations	Notes
Dunedin	0.000	0.000	US 19 Alt. (Bayshore Boulevard / SR 595) / CR 586 west – Dunedin, Palm Harbor, Historic Downtown Dunedin, Honeymoon Island State Park, Caladesi Island Ferry	Western terminus
Dunedin–Palm Harbor line	1.296	2.086	CR 1	
Dunedin–Palm Harbor line	2.055	3.307	Belcher Road (CR 501)	
Dunedin–Palm Harbor line	2.581	4.154	US 19 (SR 55) – Tarpon Springs, Clearwater, St. Petersburg	
Clearwater–Safety Harbor line	4.395	7.073	CR 611 (McMullen Booth Road)	
Oldsmar	5.332	8.581	SR 584 east / CR 752 west (Tampa Road)	Eastern terminus; western terminus of SR 584
1.000 mi = 1.609 km; 1.000 km = 0.621 mi
