= Florida State Road 584 =

Highway in Florida

State Road 584
- Tampa Road

Route information
- Maintained by FDOT
- Length: 2.135 mi (3.436 km)

Major junctions
- West end: SR 586 in Oldsmar
- East end: SR 580 in Oldsmar

Location
- Country: United States
- State: Florida
- Counties: Pinellas

Highway system
- Florida State Highway System; Interstate; US; State; Former; Pre‑1945; Toll; Scenic
← SR 583	→ SR 585

State Road 584, locally known as Tampa Road, is a two-mile-long street connecting Curlew Road (SR 586) and SR 580 in Oldsmar, Florida. A western continuation along Tampa Road (along current CR 752, formerly a section of SR 584) extends six miles (10 km) until its intersection with Alternate US 19-SR 595 near Ozona and one mile (1.6 km) north of Dunedin. At the eastern terminus of SR 584, Tampa Road becomes SR 580 and Hillsborough Avenue, a major highway serving Tampa International Airport in Hillsborough County.

== Route description ==
SR 584 begins at an intersection with SR 586 and CR 752 in Oldsmar, heading southeast as Tampa Road, a six-lane divided highway. CR 752 continues northwest on Tampa Road past this intersection. From the western terminus, the road passes through a mix of residential areas and businesses, crossing CR 667. SR 584 continues past more development before it crosses a CSX railroad line and ends at SR 580. Past this intersection, SR 580 continues along Tampa Road.

== Major intersections ==
The entire route is in Oldsmar, Pinellas County.

mi	km	Destinations	Notes
0.000	0.000	SR 586 west (Curlew Road) / CR 752 west (Tampa Road)	Western terminus
1.068	1.719	CR 667 (Forest Lakes Boulevard) – Tampa Bay Skating Academy	
2.135	3.436	SR 580 east (Tampa Road)	Eastern terminus
1.000 mi = 1.609 km; 1.000 km = 0.621 mi
