= U.S. Route 19 Alternate (Florida) =

Alternate highway route in Florida

U.S. Highway 19 Alternate
- US 19 Alternate highlighted in red

Route information
- Auxiliary route of US 19
- Maintained by FDOT
- Length: 37.114 mi (59.729 km)
- Existed: 1951–present

Major junctions
- South end: US 92 / SR 687 in St. Petersburg
- US 19 in St. Petersburg; SR 666 in Seminole; SR 686 in Largo; SR 60 in Clearwater; SR 580 in Dunedin; CR 582 in Tarpon Springs
- North end: US 19 in Holiday

Location
- Country: United States
- State: Florida
- Counties: Pinellas, Pasco

Highway system
- United States Numbered Highway System; List; Special; Divided; Florida State Highway System; Interstate; US; State; Former; Pre‑1945; Toll; Scenic
← I-595	SR 595	→ SR 597

U.S. Highway 19 Alternate (US 19 Alt.) is a 37.114-mile (59.729 km) former section of US 19 from St. Petersburg to Holiday, Florida.

Beginning at the intersection of 4th Street North (US 92 and State Road 687 (SR 687) and 5th Avenue North in St. Petersburg, it runs west of US 19 near the Gulf coast passing through the cities of Seminole, Clearwater, Dunedin, and Tarpon Springs before ending at US 19 in Holiday, Pasco County. It is also the unsigned State Road 595 (SR 595) throughout the entire route. It also runs along much of the Pinellas Trail.

== History ==
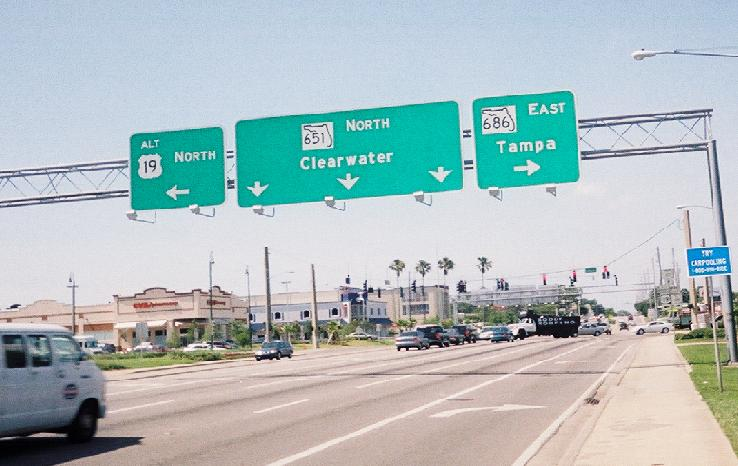
SR 686 and former SR 651 end at US 19 Alt. in Largo, May 8, 2003

US 19 Alt. was established in 1951 when US 19 was realigned from St. Petersburg through Holiday. It hugs the Gulf coast, servicing Seminole, Clearwater, Dunedin, and Tarpon Springs before ending at US 19 in Holiday. Originally, the southern terminus of US 19 Alt. was at US 92/SR 687 in downtown St. Petersburg but was truncated to US 19 in St. Petersburg.

As of September 2007, however, signage indicates that US 19 Alt. once again follows US 19's old route all the way to US 92; this original route was numbered and signed as the hidden SR 595 designation of the main route, but the signs are slowly being phased out in favor of US 19 Alt. shields. Both shields are in current use, however, for the time being, with the US 19 Alt. signage on the highway itself, and the SR 595 directional signage at the intersections, including Interstate 275 (I-275) exit 23.

=== Realignment in Clearwater–Largo ===
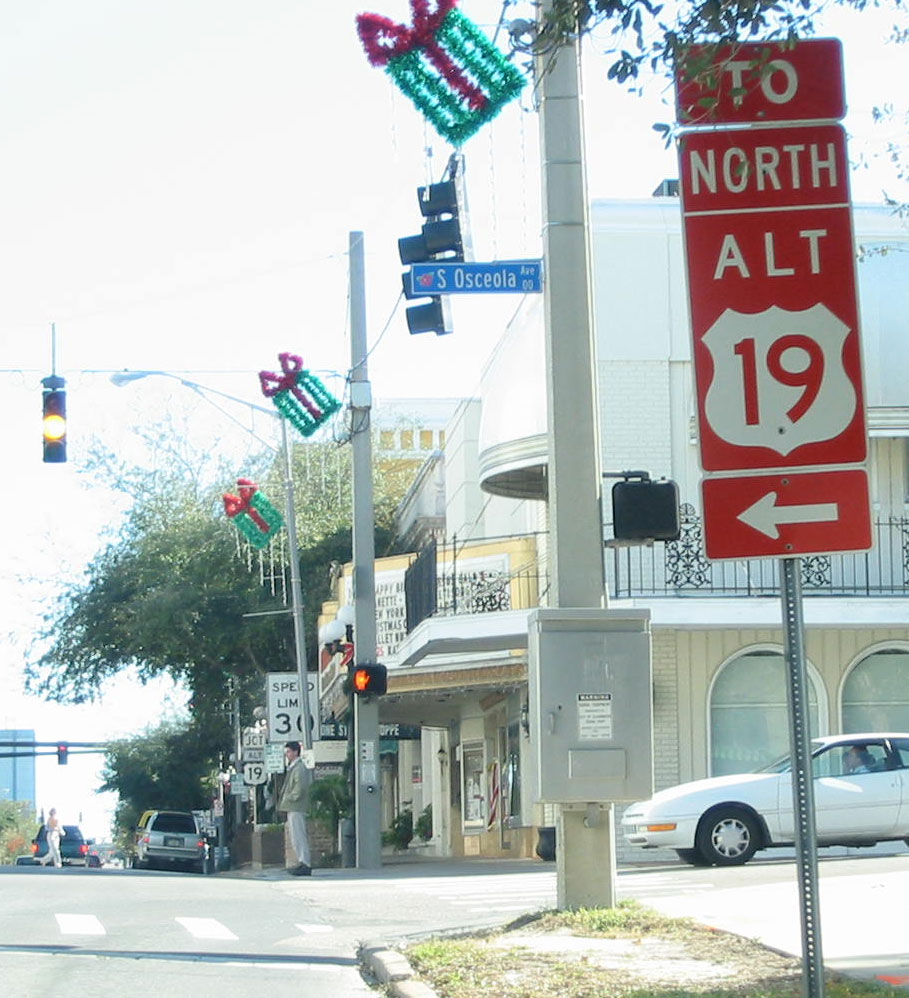
Red US 19 Alt. shield on the southwest corner of Cleveland Street and Osceola Avenue in Clearwater, December 2003

Prior to February 2007, US 19 Alt. originally went south through downtown Clearwater on Fort Harrison Avenue, which becomes Clearwater–Largo Road upon entering Largo. It then turned east along West Bay Drive to the intersection of Seminole Boulevard, then turned south. This intersection is also the western terminus of SR 686 and, until the reconfiguration, the southern terminus of SR 651.

As of February 2007, US 19 Alt. was realigned along Missouri Avenue, directly north to SR 60 (Court/Chestnut streets) in Clearwater, west to Myrtle Avenue, then north, before joining Fort Harrison Avenue south of Sunset Point Road. The new alignment now effectively bypasses the downtowns of Largo and Clearwater. The original alignment has since been decommissioned by the Florida Department of Transportation (FDOT) and transferred to the cities of Largo and Clearwater. SR 651 is used in FDOT's road inventory lists concurrent with the US 19 Alt. alignment.

When this plan was first announced in 2001, it was viewed as good news for commuters and businesses championing the project as a way to turn Clearwater into a walkable community.

=== Proposed expressways ===
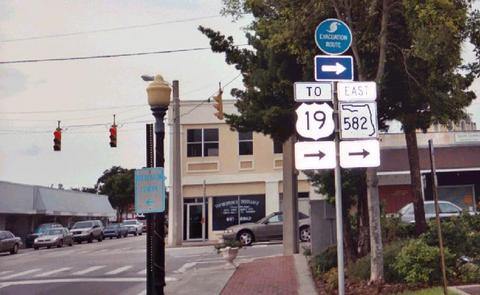
West end of SR 582 at US 19 Alt. in Tarpon Springs, July 2003

The planned St. Petersburg–Clearwater Expressway, or Pinellas Beltway, proposed in 1974, would have followed the current alignment of US 19 Alt. from I-275 to Clearwater. A freeway revolt canceled the beltway by 1980. The intersection of Seminole and Bay Pines boulevards at SR 666 is a remnant of this proposed road.

== Major intersections ==
County	Location	mi	km	Destinations	Notes
Pinellas	St. Petersburg	0.000	0.000	US 92 east / SR 687 (4th Street North)	Southern terminus of US 19 Alt./SR 595, western terminus of US 92
Pinellas	St. Petersburg	0.251	0.404	I-375 west (North Bay Drive / SR 592) / SR 592 west to I-275	
Pinellas	St. Petersburg	0.500	0.805	I-375 west (North Bay Drive / SR 592) / SR 592 west to I-275 – Tampa, Bradenton, Tropicana Field	
Pinellas	St. Petersburg	1.3	2.1	I-275 north (SR 93) / 20th Street North – Tampa	I-275 exit 23B
Pinellas	St. Petersburg	2.510	4.039	US 19 (34th Street North / SR 55) – Bradenton, Pinellas Park	
Pinellas	St. Petersburg	3.765	6.059	49th Street North (CR 611).	
Pinellas	St. Petersburg	4.522	7.277	58th Street North (CR 581)	
Pinellas	St. Petersburg	6.068	9.765	SR 693 (66th Street North)	
Pinellas	St. Petersburg–Seminole line	8.020	12.907	CR 1 (Park Street)	
Pinellas	Seminole–Bay Pines line	9.588	15.430	100th Way (CR 361 north) - VA Medical Center	
Pinellas	Seminole	10.0	16.1	SR 666 west – Madeira Beach, Redington Beach	interchange
Pinellas	Seminole	11.752	18.913	CR 694 (Park Boulevard) to I-275 – Pinellas Park, Gulf Beaches	
Pinellas	Seminole	12.510	20.133	86th Avenue North (CR 264 west)	
Pinellas	Seminole	13.518	21.755	To I-275 / 102nd Avenue North (CR 296)	
Pinellas	Largo	15.544	25.016	SR 688 (Ulmerton Road) – Tampa, Gulf Beaches	
Pinellas	Largo	16.559	26.649	CR 400 west (8th Avenue Southeast / 8th Avenue Southwest)	
Pinellas	Largo	17.066	27.465	SR 686 east (East Bay Drive / West Bay Drive) / CR 416 west – Beaches, Tampa	south end of SR 651 overlap
Pinellas	Clearwater	19.349	31.139	Lakeview Road (CR 488)	
Pinellas	Clearwater	20.107	32.359	SR 60 east (Court Street / SR 651 north)	north end of SR 651 overlap; south end of SR 60 overlap
Pinellas	Clearwater	20.637	33.212	SR 60 west (Court Street) – Beaches	north end of SR 60 overlap
Pinellas	Clearwater	21.062	33.896	SR 590 east (Drew Street)	
Pinellas	Clearwater	22.592	36.358	CR 576 east (Sunset Point Road)	
Pinellas	Clearwater–Dunedin line	23.090	37.160	Union Street (CR 600 east)	
Pinellas	Dunedin	24.492	39.416	SR 580 east (Skinner Boulevard) – Oldsmar	
Pinellas	Dunedin	26.939	43.354	SR 586 east (Curlew Road) / CR 586 west (Causeway Boulevard / Dunedin Causeway) – Dunedin Beach, Oldsmar, Honeymoon Island State Park	
Pinellas	Dunedin	27.427	44.139	Orange Street (CR 377 north)	
Pinellas	Palm Harbor	28.420	45.738	CR 752 (Tampa Road) – Ozona, Oldsmar	
Pinellas	Palm Harbor	28.676	46.150	Virginia Avenue (CR 377)	
Pinellas	Palm Harbor	29.177	46.956	CR 776 east (Nebraska Avenue)	
Pinellas	Palm Harbor	30.167	48.549	Crystal Beach Avenue (CR 808 west)	
Pinellas	Palm Harbor	30.339	48.826	CR 816 east (Alderman Road)	
Pinellas	Palm Harbor	30.615	49.270	Ulelah Avenue	
Pinellas	Palm Harbor–Tarpon Springs line	32.586	52.442	Klosterman Road (CR 880) - St. Petersburg College, Leepa-Rattner Museum of Art	
Pinellas	Tarpon Springs	33.645	54.146	Meres Boulevard (CR 399 north)	
Pinellas	Tarpon Springs	34.237	55.099	Tarpon Avenue to US 19 – Lutz	former SR 582 east
Pinellas	Tarpon Springs	35.189	56.631	Anclote Road (CR 992 west)	
Pinellas	Tarpon Springs	36.212	58.278	Anclote Boulevard (CR 994 west)	
Pasco	Holiday	37.114	59.729	US 19 (SR 55) – New Port Richey, Clearwater, St. Petersburg	
1.000 mi = 1.609 km; 1.000 km = 0.621 mi: Concurrency terminus

== State Road 595 and County Road 595 ==
State Road 595 and County Road 595
- Location: Hernando County–Pasco County

Two extensions of hidden SR 595 exist beyond US 19 Alt. The first one is between US 19 and US 92 in downtown St. Petersburg, though this is being phased out, as signage indicates that US 19 Alt. now ends at US 92 instead of US 19. The other is a brief multiplex with US 19 in Holiday which terminates a block north of the northern terminus of US 19 Alt. in Holiday at Mile Stretch Road. County Road 595 (CR 595) consists of Mile Stretch Road, then takes a sharp left onto Grand Boulevard. Within Holiday and Elfers, the road runs along the right-of-way of a former railroad line before heading to Main Street in New Port Richey, where it secretly makes another left turn before terminating at US 19. CR 595 can be found again between Hudson and Aripeka, where it crosses the Pasco–Hernando county line along the Gulf of Mexico on its way toward Hernando Beach, only to bypass downtown Hernando Beach and terminate once again with US 19, but this time also with the western terminus of CR 574/Spring Hill Drive.
