= List of county roads in Pinellas County, Florida =

- County road shields used in Florida

Highway names
- Interstates: Interstate X (I-X)
- US Highways: U.S. Highway X (US X)
- State: State Road X (SR X)
- County: County Road X (CR X)

System links
- County roads in Florida; County roads in Pinellas County

The following is a list of county roads in Pinellas County, Florida. All county roads are maintained by the county in which they reside, however not all of them are marked with standard MUTCD approved county road shields.

== List ==
| Number | Length (mi) | Length (km) | Southern or western terminus | Northern or eastern terminus | Local names | Formed | Removed | Notes |
|---|---|---|---|---|---|---|---|---|
| CR 1 | 19.91 | 32.04 | CR 150 in St. Petersburg | CR 816 in Palm Harbor | Park Street N, Starkey Road, Keene Road, Omaha Street N | — | — | Former SR 695 (US 19 Alt. to SR 694) |
| CR 138 | 3.85 | 6.20 | SR 693 in South Pasadena | US 19 in St. Petersburg | Gulfport Boulevard S, 22nd Avenue S. | — | — | |
| CR 150 | 8.04 | 12.94 | SR 699 in Treasure Island | SR 687 in St. Petersburg | 107th Avenue, Treasure Island Causeway, Central Avenue | — | — | |
| CR 183 | 5.97 | 9.61 | SR 688 in Indian Rocks Beach | CR 245 in Clearwater | Gulf Boulevard | — | — | |
| CR 184 | 6.86 | 11.04 | Alt US 19/SR 595 in St. Petersburg | US 92/SR 687 in St. Petersburg | 38th Avenue N | — | — | Former SR 595A (US 19 to rail underpass) |
| CR 192 | 3.30 | 5.31 | CR 1 in St. Petersburg | CR 611 in Lealman | 46th Avenue N. | — | — | |
| CR 202 | 7.06 | 11.36 | CR 1 in St. Petersburg | US 92/SR 687 in St. Petersburg | 54th Avenue N. | — | — | |
| CR 213 | 1.01 | 1.63 | CR 296 in Seminole | SR 688 in Largo | Hamlin Boulevard | — | — | |
| CR 216 | 7.79 | 12.54 | CR 501 in Pinellas Park | Bayou Grande Boulevard NE in St. Petersburg | 62nd Avenue N | — | — | |
| CR 233 | 7.80 | 12.55 | CR 694/CR 240 in Seminole | CR 321 in Clearwater | Oakhurst Road, Indian Rocks Road, Belleview Boulevard | — | — | Former SR 694 (CR 694 to SR 688) and SR 697 (SR 688 to US 19 Alt.) |
| CR 240 | 2.68 | 4.31 | CR 694/CR 233 in Seminole | CR 321 in Seminole | Oakhurst Road, 74th Avenue N, Old Oakhurst Road, 116th Street N, 66th Avenue N | — | — | |
| CR 245 | 1.15 | 1.85 | CR 183 in Clearwater | SR 60 in Clearwater | Gulfview Boulevard, Coronado Drive | — | — | |
| CR 264 | 2.50 | 4.02 | CR 233 in Seminole | Alt US 19/SR 595 in Seminole | 86th Avenue N | — | — | |
| CR 296 | 10.81 | 17.40 | CR 213 in Seminole | CR 682 in St. Petersburg | 102nd Avenue N, Bryan Dairy Road, 118th Avenue N, Former 126th Avenue N. | — | — | |
| CR 298 | 2.25 | 3.62 | SR 693 in Pinellas Park | CR 611 in Pinellas Park | 102nd Avenue North, 58th Street North, 110th Avenue North | — | — | |
| CR 321 | 10.67 | 17.17 | SR 666 in Madeira Beach | SR 60 in Clearwater | Duhme Road, 113th Street N, Ridge Road SW, Clearwater-Largo Road, S Fort Harrison Avenue | — | — | Former SR 595A |
| CR 345 | 2.90 | 4.67 | Alt US 19/SR 595 in Clearwater | Jackson Street in Dunedin | Marshall Street, Fulton Avenue, Fairmont Street, Douglas Avenue | — | — | |
| CR 346 | 0.75 | 1.21 | SR 693 in Pinellas Park | US 19 in Pinellas Park | 126th Avenue North | — | — | Former SR 696 |
| CR 355 | 1.33 | 2.14 | SR 590 in Clearwater | CR 345 in Clearwater | Betty Lane, Overbrook Avenue | — | — | |
| CR 361 | 0.57 | 0.92 | Alt US 19/SR 595 in Bay Pines | 54th Avenue N in Seminole | 100th Way N | — | — | |
| CR 369 | 1.88 | 3.03 | CR 896 in Tarpon Springs | Riverside Drive in Tarpon Springs | Florida Avenue | — | — | |
| CR 375 | 7.04 | 11.33 | SR 686 in Largo | SR 580 in Dunedin | Highland Avenue, Patricia Avenue | — | — | |
| CR 376 | 1.11 | 1.79 | CR 501 in Largo | US 19 in Largo | 142nd Avenue N | — | — | |
| CR 377 | 1.93 | 3.11 | Alt US 19/SR 595 in Dunedin | CR 1 in Palm Harbor | Orange Street, Pennsylvania Avenue, Virginia Avenue | — | — | |
| CR 385 | 3.56 | 5.73 | SR 686 in Largo | SR 590 in Clearwater | Lake Avenue, Lake Drive | — | — | |
| CR 399 | 1.13 | 1.82 | Alt US 19/SR 595 in Tarpon Springs | CR 928 in Tarpon Springs | Meres Boulevard, Virginia Avenue, Whitcomb Boulevard | — | — | |
| CR 400 | 2.06 | 3.32 | CR 233 in Largo | Alt US 19/SR 595 in Largo | 8th Avenue Southwest | — | — | |
| CR 416 | 3.47 | 5.58 | CR 183 in Belleair Beach | Alt US 19/SR 595/SR 686 in Largo | Causeway Boulevard, Belleair Beach Causeway, West Bay Drive | — | — | |
| CR 425 | 4.80 | 7.72 | SR 590 in Clearwater | CR 501 in Clearwater | Hercules Avenue, Greenbriar Boulevard | — | — | |
| CR 432 | 1.00 | 1.61 | CR 233 in Belleair Bluffs | Alt US 19/SR 595 in Largo | Mehlenbacher Road | — | — | |
| CR 434 | 0.40 | 0.64 | CR 385 in Largo | CR 1 in Largo | McMullen Road | — | — | |
| CR 438 | 1.05 | 1.69 | US 19 in Largo | 58th Street N in South Highpoint | Whitney Road | — | — | |
| CR 464 | 4.12 | 6.63 | CR 321 in Clearwater | US 19 in Clearwater | Belleair Road | — | — | |
| CR 474 | 2.72 | 4.38 | CR 375 in Clearwater | US 19 in Clearwater | Nursery Road | — | — | |
| CR 488 | 2.30 | 3.70 | CR 321 in Clearwater | CR 1 in Clearwater | Lakeview Road | — | — | Former SR 595B (west of Myrtle Avenue) |
| CR 501 | 21.45 | 34.52 | CR 202 in Kenneth City | CR 880 in Tarpon Springs | 71st Street N., Belcher Road | — | — | |
| CR 528 | 1.41 | 2.27 | SR 590 in Clearwater | US 19 in Clearwater | Drew Street | — | — | |
| CR 535 | 2.54 | 4.09 | SR 60 in Clearwater | CR 501 in Clearwater | Old Coachman Road | — | — | |
| CR 547 | 0.71 | 1.14 | CR 577 in Palm Harbor | US 19 in Palm Harbor | Highlands Boulevard | — | — | |
| CR 548 | 2.10 | 3.38 | Alt US 19/SR 595 in Clearwater | CR 1 in Clearwater | Palmetto Street | — | — | |
| CR 576 | 5.97 | 9.61 | Alt US 19/SR 595 in Clearwater | 10th Avenue N/Main Street in Safety Harbor | Sunset Point Road, Main Street | — | — | Former SR 588 |
| CR 577 | 0.39 | 0.63 | CR 752 in Palm Harbor | CR 547 in Palm Harbor | Lake St. George Drive | — | — | |
| CR 581 | 4.72 | 7.60 | CR 150 in St. Petersburg | SR 694 in Pinellas Park | 58th Street N | — | — | |
| CR 582 | 6.80 | 10.94 | Alt US 19/SR 595 in Tarpon Springs | Hillsborough Co. line near Tarpon Springs (continues as Tarpon Springs Road to CR 587) | Tarpon Avenue, Keystone Road | — | — | Former SR 582 |
| CR 584 | 1.30 | 2.09 | CR 1 in Clearwater | CR 501 in Clearwater | Montclair Road | — | — | |
| CR 586 | 2.55 | 4.10 | Honeymoon Island State Park in Dunedin | Alt US 19/SR 595/SR 586 in Dunedin | Causeway Boulevard | — | — | Former SR 586; also known as CR 712 |
| CR 600 | 2.43 | 3.91 | Alt US 19/SR 595 in Clearwater | CR 425 in Clearwater | Union Street | — | — | |
| CR 611 | 29.79 | 47.94 | CR 138 in Gulfport | Pasco Co. line near Tarpon Springs (continues as CR 77) | 49th Street, Bayside Bridge, McMullen-Booth Road, East Lake Road | — | — | Former SR 593 (SR 60 to SR 586) and SR 691 (SR 694 to US 19) |
| CR 618 | 0.68 | 1.09 | CR 1 in Dunedin | CR 425 in Clearwater | Virginia Avenue | — | — | |
| CR 632 | 1.39 | 2.24 | Highland Avenue in Dunedin | CR 1 in Dunedin | Virginia Street | — | — | |
| CR 638 | 2.93 | 4.72 | US 19 in Clearwater | SR 590 in Safety Harbor | Enterprise Road | — | — | |
| CR 679 | 1.39 | 2.24 | SR 679 in Fort De Soto Park | Dead end in Fort De Soto Park | Anderson Boulevard | — | — | |
| CR 682 | 0.54 | 0.87 | CR 296 in St. Petersburg | SR 686 in St. Petersburg | 28th Street N | — | — | |
| CR 690 | 7.10 | 11.43 | CR 1 in St. Petersburg | US 92/SR 687 in St. Petersburg, Florida | 22nd Avenue North | — | — | Former SR 690 (US 19 to I-275) |
| CR 691 | 3.22 | 5.18 | Dr. Martin Luther King Jr. Street N in St. Petersburg | US 19 in Pinellas Park | Haines Road | — | — | Former SR 689 |
| CR 693 | 0.20 | 0.32 | CR 150 in St. Petersburg | SR 693 in St. Petersburg | 66th Street N | — | — | County extension of SR 693 |
| CR 694 | 7.01 | 11.28 | SR 699 in Indian Shores | SR 693/SR 694 in Pinellas Park | Park Boulevard | — | — | Former SR 694 (east of CR 233) |
| CR 752 | 5.47 | 8.80 | CR 377 in Palm Harbor | SR 584/SR 586 in Oldsmar | Tampa Road | — | — | Former SR 584 |
| CR 776 | 1.39 | 2.24 | Alt US 19/SR 595 in Palm Harbor | US 19 in Palm Harbor | Nebraska Avenue | — | — | Former SR 584A |
| CR 803 | 4.89 | 7.87 | CR 216 in St. Petersburg | I-275 in St. Petersburg | Dr. Martin Luther King Jr. Street N | — | — | Former SR 688 (north of SR 694) and SR 689 (SR 595 to CR 691) |
| CR 808 | 0.52 | 0.84 | Gulf Drive in Palm Harbor | Alt US 19/SR 595 in Palm Harbor | Crystal Beach Avenue | — | — | |
| CR 816 | 2.01 | 3.23 | Alt US 19/SR 595 in Palm Harbor | US 19 in Palm Harbor | Alderman Road | — | — | |
| CR 823 | 2.82 | 4.54 | CR 803 in St. Petersburg | US 92 in St. Petersburg | 83rd Avenue N, Patica Road NE, San Martin Boulevard NE, W Gandy Blvd | — | — | |
| CR 880 | 2.53 | 4.07 | CR 896 in Tarpon Springs | US 19 in Tarpon Springs | Carlton Road, Klosterman Road | — | — | |
| CR 896 | 0.49 | 0.79 | CR 369 in Tarpon Springs | CR 880 in Tarpon Springs | Curlew Place | — | — | |
| CR 928 | 0.90 | 1.45 | CR 369 in Tarpon Springs | CR 399 in Tarpon Springs | Gulf Road | — | — | |
| CR 992 | 2.38 | 3.83 | CR 994 in Tarpon Springs | Alt US 19/SR 595 in Tarpon Springs | Anclote Road | — | — | |
| CR 994 | 0.90 | 1.45 | Pasco County line in Tarpon Springs (continues as CR 595A) | Alt US 19/SR 595 in Tarpon Springs | Anclote Boulevard | — | — | |
| CR 996 | 1.71 | 2.75 | CR 611 near Tarpon Springs | Pasco Co. line near Tarpon Springs (continues as Trinity Boulevard to SR 54) | Trinity Boulevard | — | — | |
