= Interstate 175 =

Highway in Florida

Interstate 175
- South Bay Drive
- I-175 highlighted in red

Route information
- Auxiliary route of I-75
- Maintained by FDOT
- Length: 1.372 mi (2.208 km)
- Existed: 1980–present
- NHS: Entire route

Major junctions
- West end: I-275 in St. Petersburg
- East end: SR 594 / SR 687 in St. Petersburg

Location
- Country: United States
- State: Florida
- Counties: Pinellas

Highway system
- Interstate Highway System; Main; Auxiliary; Suffixed; Business; Future; Florida State Highway System; Interstate; US; State; Former; Pre‑1945; Toll; Scenic
← SR 173	→ SR 187
← SR 592	SR 594	→ I-595

Interstate 175 (I-175) in St. Petersburg, Florida, also known as South Bay Drive, is a 1.3-mile-long (2.1 km) spur route from I-275 into downtown St. Petersburg. It is also designated as the unsigned highway State Road 594 (SR 594). There is a sibling segment of freeway nearby designated as I-375.

== Route description ==
The Interstate begins at I-275 with Tropicana Field on the northeast side of the interchange, going east into downtown St. Petersburg, passing through eastbound exits with 9th Street South/8th Street South and 6th Street South before the Interstate ends at 5th Avenue South next to an at-grade intersection with 4th Street South. Westbound, the Interstate begins with a split from southbound 4th Street South just north of the 4th Street South/5th Avenue South intersection and has no exits until the interchange with I-275. Along with its sister highway, I-375, I-175 lacks exit numbers.

== History ==
The freeway was originally to have been a part of the former Pinellas Belt Expressway, which would have continued from its western terminus at I-275. The Pinellas Belt Expressway was budgeted in 1974 but was canceled in the late 1970s due to local opposition. I-175 was built between 1977 and 1980 and opened on April 23, 1980, at a cost of $5.5 million (equivalent to $18 million in 2025).

When I-75 was relocated in the late 1970s–early 1980s, five miles (8.0 km) of additional Interstate became available; thus, the St. Petersburg feeder sections of I-175 and neighboring I-375 were upgraded to Interstate status.

== Exit list ==
The entire route is in St. Petersburg, Pinellas County. All exits are unnumbered.

mi	km	Destinations	Notes
0.000	0.000	I-275 (SR 93) – Bradenton, Tampa	Western terminus, I-275 exit 22; tri-stack interchange.
0.785	1.263	M.L. King Jr. Street South / 8th Street South	Eastbound exit and westbound entrance; access to Bayfront Health St. Petersburg
1.089	1.753	6th Street South	Eastbound exit and westbound entrance
1.285	2.068	4th Street South	East end of I-175; SR 594 continues one block (eastbound only)
1.372	2.208	SR 687 north (3rd Street South) – Downtown St. Petersburg	
1.000 mi = 1.609 km; 1.000 km = 0.621 mi: Incomplete access
