= Interstate 375 (Florida) =

Highway in Florida

Interstate 375
- North Bay Drive

Route information
- Auxiliary route of I-75
- Maintained by FDOT
- Length: 1.220 mi (1.963 km)
- Existed: 1979–present
- NHS: Entire route

Major junctions
- West end: I-275 in St. Petersburg
- East end: US 19 Alt. / SR 595 in St. Petersburg

Location
- Country: United States
- State: Florida
- Counties: Pinellas

Highway system
- Interstate Highway System; Main; Auxiliary; Suffixed; Business; Future; Florida State Highway System; Interstate; US; State; Former; Pre‑1945; Toll; Scenic
← SR 373	→ SR 375
← SR 590	SR 592	→ SR 594

Interstate 375 (I-375) in St. Petersburg, Florida, also known as North Bay Drive, is a 1.2-mile-long (1.9 km) spur route from I-275 into downtown. It is also designated as the unsigned State Road 592 (SR 592). There is a sibling segment of freeway nearby that is designated I-175. It is the shortest Interstate Highway in Florida.

== Route description ==
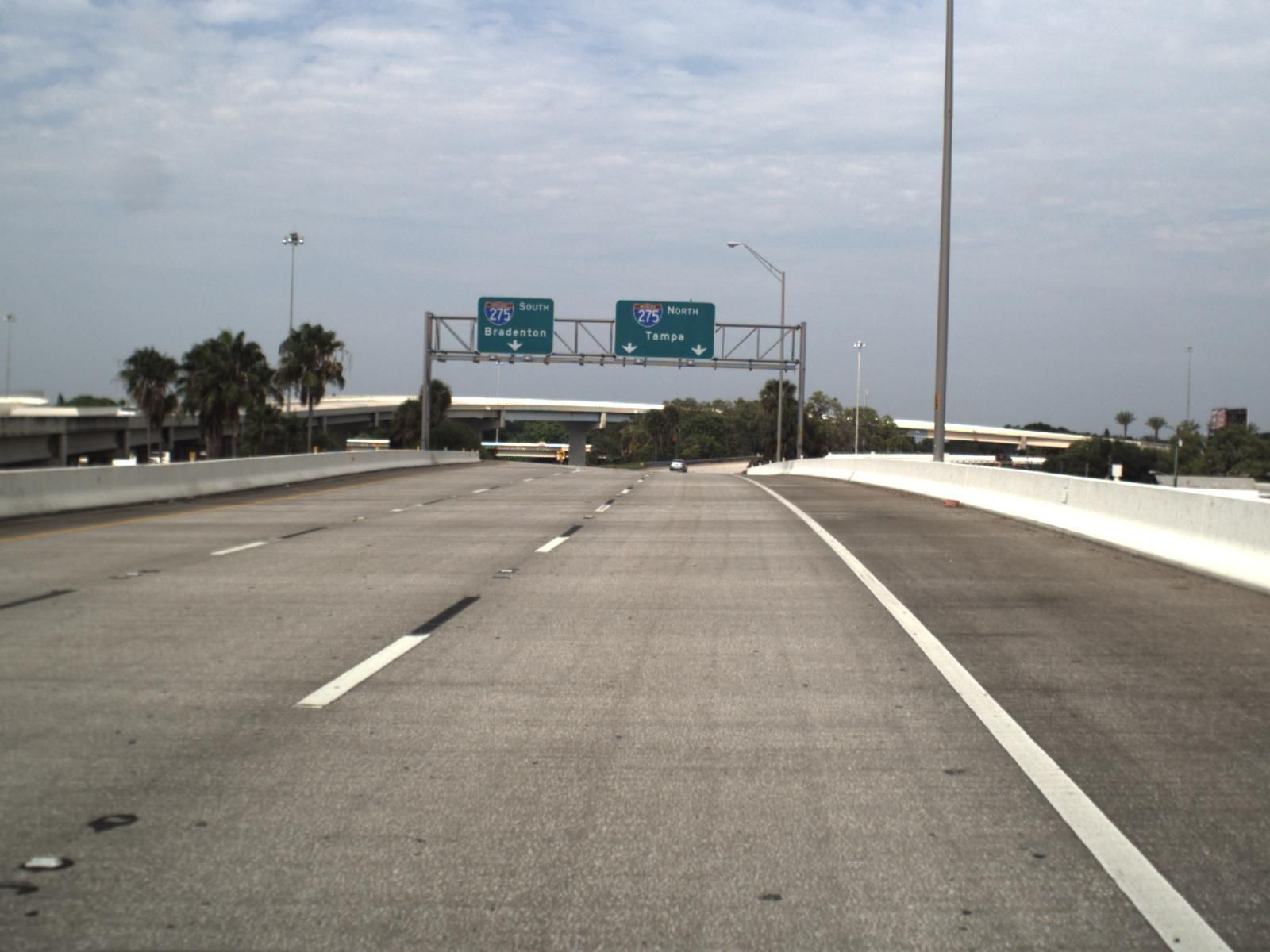
Western terminus of Interstate 375 in St. Petersburg

I-375 begins at an interchange with I-275 (exit 23), heading east toward downtown St. Petersburg, with interchanges with 8th Street North/9th Street North, before ending at 4th Avenue North west of 4th Street North. Westbound I-375 begins with a split of 5th Avenue North west of 4th Street North, with no exits until reaching I-275. Along with its sister highway I-175, I-375 lacks exit numbers.

== History ==
=== Original aspirations ===
I-375 was originally planned as a much longer state highway, extending west of I-275 and following a CSX rail line toward a proposed toll road near Clearwater. When I-75 was relocated in the late 1970s–early 1980s, five miles (8.0 km) of additional Interstate became available, thus the St. Petersburg feeder sections of I-375 and the neighboring I-175 were upgraded to Interstate status. However, the Interstate Highway standards at the time would not allow the I-375 extension to receive federal Interstate Highway funding, leaving only the section east of I-275 built to freeway standards. The planned freeway extension of I-375 was canceled by officials at the Florida Department of Transportation (FDOT) in the mid-1970s. The cancelation of the rest of I-375 eventually resulted in US Highway 19 (US 19) between SR 694 (Gandy Boulevard) and the Pinellas–Pasco county line being upgraded to freeway standards.

A ramp stub at the I-375 interchange was originally planned to be a connection to 20th Street North. The intersection at 20th Street North and 5th Avenue North was already convoluted before I-275's construction, and FDOT decided not to build the connection.

=== 2007 tanker incident ===
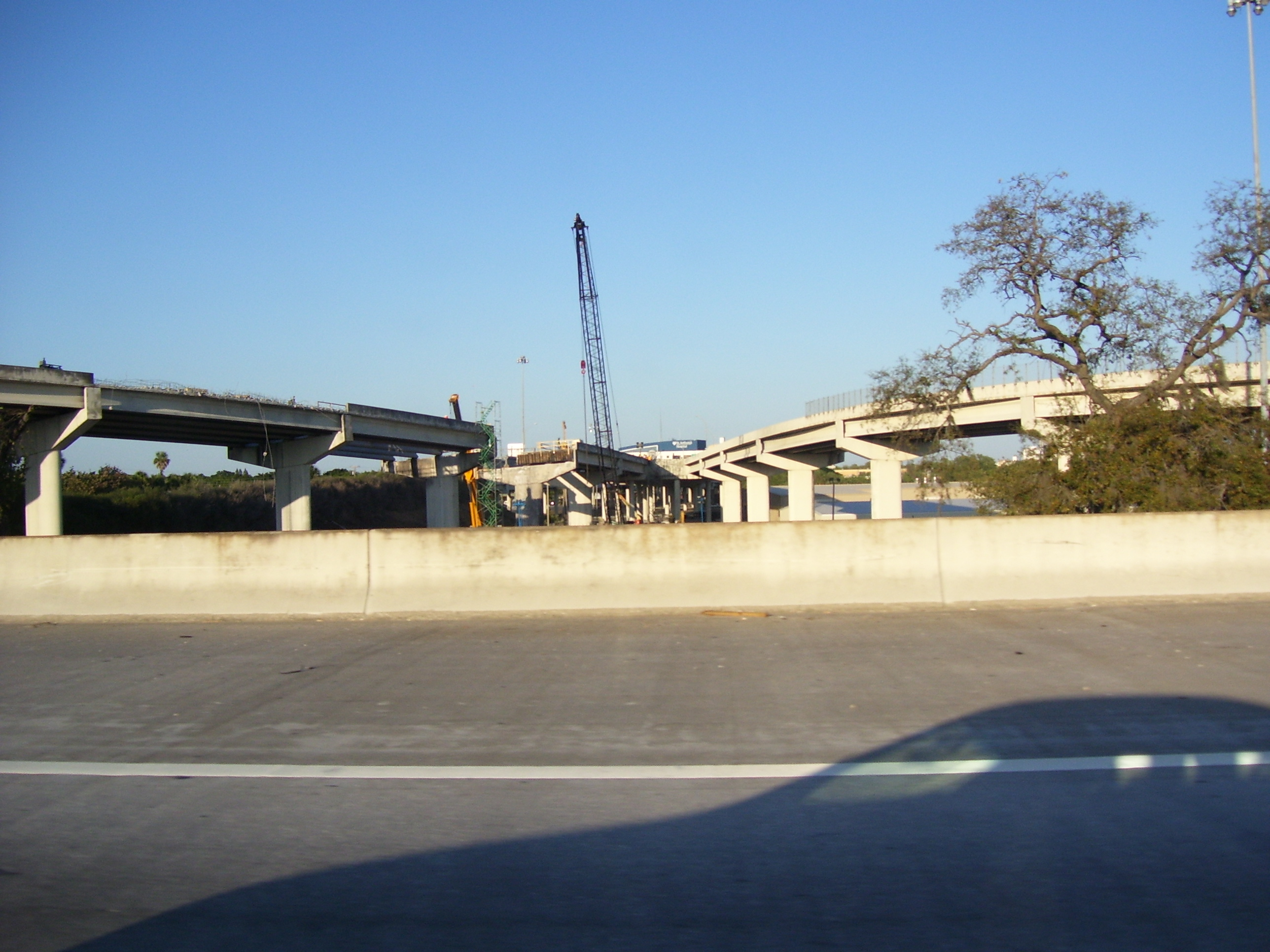
The I-275/I-375 junction during reconstruction of the damaged flyover (left)

On March 28, 2007, a tanker entering I-375 east from I-275 south's left exit lost control and hit the retaining wall, catching fire and burning for several hours. The resulting fire became so intense that it severely damaged a large section of the I-375 overpass from southbound I-275. Intense flames also fell to a city-owned (St. Petersburg) construction equipment yard and destroyed 8 to 10 city vehicles, causing an estimated $500,000 (equivalent to $726,578 in 2024) in damage to the yard. The fire also spread to St. Petersburg's stormwater system, blowing off manhole covers within the vicinity. One St. Petersburg police officer was injured as a result being struck by one of those manhole covers.

In the end, the driver of the tanker died on scene due to the fire. The I-375 overpass remained closed for almost four weeks while FDOT rebuilt the damaged sections of the bridge, reopening to traffic on the morning of April 22, 2007, about one week ahead of schedule. Reconstruction of the I-375 overpass included the rebuilding of one entire span, plus 11 concrete beams. In addition, one of the support columns underwent significant repairs to ensure its strength in supporting the roadway. FDOT placed signs along I-275 south, indicating the left exit onto I-375, due to this, as well as other fatal incidents, that have occurred on the interchange.

== Exit list ==
The entire route is in St. Petersburg, Pinellas County.

mi	km	Old exit	New exit	Destinations	Notes
0.000	0.000	—	—	I-275 (SR 93) – Bradenton, Tampa	Western terminus; I-275 exits 23 northbound, 23A southbound; tri-stack interchange.
0.907	1.460	1	—	M.L. King Jr. Street North / 8th Street North	Eastbound exit and westbound entrance
1.220	1.963	2	—	To US 92 (4th Street North) (via US 19 Alt./SR 595 south)	Eastern terminus; eastbound exit and westbound entrance
1.000 mi = 1.609 km; 1.000 km = 0.621 mi: Incomplete access
