= Florida State Road 93 =

State highway in Florida, United States

State Road 93

Route information
- Maintained by FDOT
- Length: 470.708 mi (757.531 km)

Location
- Country: United States
- State: Florida

Highway system
- Florida State Highway System; Interstate; US; State; Former; Pre‑1945; Toll; Scenic
← US 92	→ SR 93A

State Road 93 (SR 93) is the unsigned designation from the Florida Department of Transportation (FDOT) for most of Interstate 75 (I-75) in Florida. It runs from the Georgia state line to the interchange with the Palmetto Expressway and the Gratigny Parkway in Miami Lakes near the Opa-locka, Florida, Airport.

In the Tampa–St. Petersburg area, SR 93 is the hidden FDOT designation of I-275 as it traverses Tampa Bay along the Sunshine Skyway Bridge, crosses Old Tampa Bay on the Howard Frankland Bridge before intersecting with I-4 (unsigned SR 400) at the historical southern terminus of I-75 before continuing northward to rejoin the parent route near Lutz.

== Related routes ==
=== State Road 93A ===
State Road 93A
- Location: Manatee County, Hillsborough County, Pasco County

While I-275 goes toward the shore of the Gulf of Mexico in the Tampa–St. Petersburg area, I-75 bypasses the region by veering inland. Originally I-75E, the stretch of I-75 from Lutz to Gillette has the unsigned designation State Road 93A.

=== State Road 93F ===
State Road 93F
- Location: Hillsborough County, Pasco County, Hernando County

State Road 93F is the name given to a series of frontage roads that run parallel to both SR 93 and SR 93A along I-75:

- Southeast 33rd Street from SR 674 running 1.038 miles (1.670 km) south to the east of I-75.
- Southeast 33rd Street from SR 674 running 0.19 miles (0.31 km) south to the west of I-75.
- Teco Road from SR 674 running 0.466 miles (0.750 km) north to the west of I-75.
- Southeast 14th Avenue for 0.127 miles (0.204 km) west of I-75.
- Morris Bridge Road from CR 582A, intersecting SR 582, for 2.801 miles (4.508 km) south to Navajo Avenue west of I-75.
- Grand Regency Boulevard for 0.382 miles north from SR 60 to the east of I-75.
- La Rose Road for 0.34 miles (0.55 km) north from US 98 to the east of I-75.
- Fincher Lane for 0.57 miles (0.92 km) south from CR 41 in Pasco County to the east of I-75.

=== State Road 253 ===
State Road 253
- Location: Alachua
- Length: 1.55 mi (2.49 km)

State Road 253, known as April Boulevard, is a 1.5-mile (2.4 km) frontage road for I-75 (SR 93) in Alachua running directly east of the freeway. The road's southern terminus is at US 441 (SR 20/SR 25) where it heads north until it dead ends.

Browse numbered routes
← SR 249	SR 253	→ SR 261

=== State Road 547 ===
State Road 547
- Location: Tampa
- Length: 1.702 mi (2.739 km)

State Road 547, known as Lizards Tail Road, is a 1.7-mile (2.7 km) frontage road for I-75 (SR 93A) in Tampa. The road dead-ends at its northern terminus near New Tampa Boulevard and terminates at Park Centre Drive on the south end near the USAA facility entrance. The road is not contiguous with any other state highway.

Browse numbered routes
← SR 546	SR 547	→ SR 548

=== State Road 585 ===
State Road 585
- Location: Tampa
- Length: 0.694 mi (1,117 m)

State Road 585, known as Dona Michelle Drive, is a 0.69-mile (1.11 km) frontage road for I-75 (SR 93A) in Tampa. The road's northern terminus is at Bruce B. Downs Boulevard (CR 581) in Tampa. It heads south, running east of I-75, before ending at 134th Avenue Northeast at the New Tampa Nature Park.

Browse numbered routes
← SR 584	SR 585	→ SR 586

=== State Road 663 ===
State Road 663
- Location: St. Petersburg
- Length: 0.390 mi (628 m)

State Road 663, known as Sunshine Skyway Lane South, is a 0.39-mile (0.63 km) frontage road running east of I-275 (SR 93) in St. Petersburg. The road's northern terminus is at Pinellas Point Drive, and the southern terminus is at a condominium complex entrance just south of the I-275 offramp.

Browse numbered routes
← SR 659	SR 663	→ SR 666

=== State Road 928 ===
State Road 928
- Location: Hialeah
- Length: 0.913 mi (1,469 m)

State Road 928, known as West 84th Street and West 28th Court, is a 0.91-mile (1.46 km) frontage road for I-75 (SR 93) in Hialeah. The road starts at Hialeah Gardens Boulevard south of I-75 exit 2. It travels east and terminates at the intersection of Northwest 87th Avenue. West 84th Street continues east as SR 938.

Browse numbered routes
← SR 925	SR 928	→ SR 929

=== State Road 938 ===
State Road 938
- Location: Hialeah
- Length: 0.811 mi (1,305 m)

State Road 938, known as West 84th Street and Northwest 138th Street, is a 0.81-mile (1.30 km) frontage road for I-75 (SR 93) in Hialeah. The road starts at the intersection of Northwest 87th Avenue and SR 928 and heads east to terminate at the intersection with West 23rd Avenue (SR 918 east) and West 20th Avenue (SR 923 south).

Browse numbered routes
← SR 934	SR 938	→ SR 939

=== State Road 5001 ===
State Road 5001
- Location: Hillsborough County
- Length: 0.243 mi (391 m)

State Road 5001, known as Dairy Road, is a 0.24-mile (0.39 km) north-south frontage road for I-75 (SR 93A) in Hillsborough County running from Graves Road to Columbus Drive east of the freeway.

=== State Road 5005 ===
State Road 5005
- Location: Hillsborough County
- Length: 0.311 mi (501 m)

State Road 5005, known as Old Morris Bridge Road, is a 0.31-mile (0.50 km) frontage road for I-75 (SR 93A) in Hillsborough County. The road starts at Indigo Breeze Court at the entrance of the Sage Brook community, heading north until it dead-ends at its northern terminus near I-75 exit 266 at Morris Bridge Road (CR 582A).

=== State Road 5009 ===
State Road 5009
- Location: Pasco County
- Length: 0.197 mi (317 m)

State Road 5009, known as Powerline Road, is a 0.20-mile (0.32 km) frontage road for I-75 (SR 93) in Pasco County running from Lockhart Road to Roosevelt Road near the freeway underpass.

=== State Road 5050 ===
State Road 5050
- Location: Pasco County
- Length: 0.243 mi (391 m)

State Road 5050, known as Levi Loop, is a 0.24-mile (0.39 km) frontage road for I-75 (SR 93) in Pasco County running from an interchange with SR 52 and SR 5052 and ending at a cul-de-sac near the freeway's exit 285 interchange.

=== State Road 5052 ===
State Road 5052
- Location: Pasco County
- Length: 0.236 mi (380 m)

State Road 5052, known as Old Tampa Bay Drive, is a 0.24-mile (0.39 km) frontage road for I-75 (SR 93) in Pasco County running from the interchange with SR 52 and SR 5050 and terminating as a state highway before continuing as a residential street.

Browse numbered routes
← SR 2221	SR 5001; SR 5005; SR 5009; SR 5050; SR 5052	→ SR 5054
