= Howard Frankland Bridge =

Bridge in Florida, United States

W. Howard Frankland Bridge
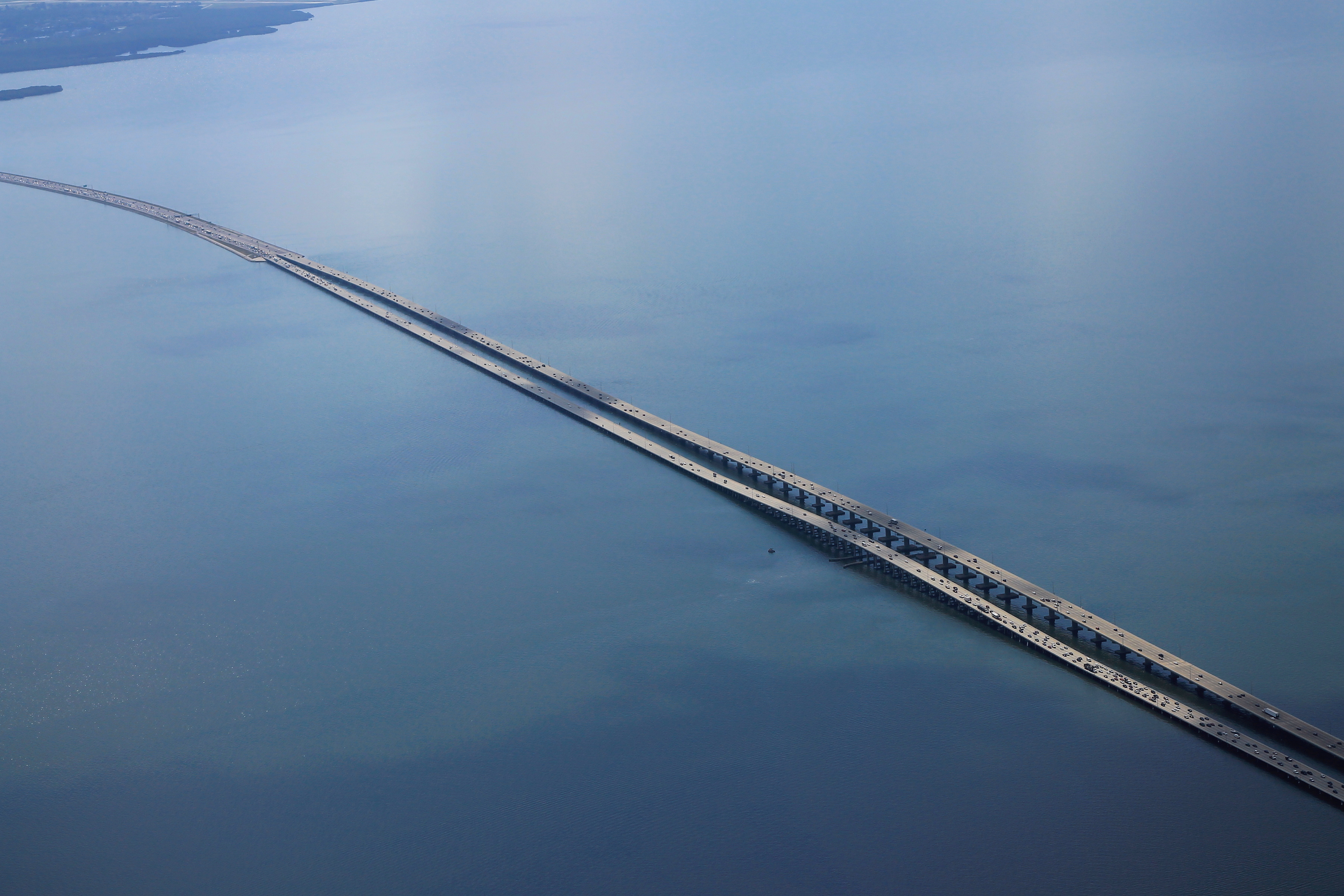
- Aerial view of the bridge in 2018
- Coordinates: 27.92793°N 82.58755°W
- Carries: 8 lanes of I-275
- Crosses: Old Tampa Bay
- Locale: St. Petersburg to Tampa, Florida
- Other name(s): Howard Franklin, Frankland Bridge
- Named for: William Howard Frankland
- Maintained by: Florida Department of Transportation
- ID number: 150107 (northbound); 150210 (southbound)

Characteristics
- Total length: 15,872 ft (4,838 m) (northbound); 15,900 ft (4,846 m) (southbound)
- Width: 58.4 ft (17.8 m) (northbound); 68.9 ft (21.0 m) (southbound)
- Clearance below: 43 ft (13 m) (northbound); 48.9 ft (14.9 m) (southbound)

History
- Opened: 1960 (former northbound); 1990 (northbound, former southbound 2025 (southbound)

Statistics
- Daily traffic: 174,000 (2024)

Location
- Interactive map of W. Howard Frankland Bridge

The W. Howard Frankland Bridge is the central fixed-link bridge spanning Old Tampa Bay from St. Petersburg, Florida to Tampa, Florida. It is one of three bridges connecting Hillsborough County and Pinellas County; the others being Gandy Bridge and Courtney Campbell Causeway. The bridge carries Interstate 275 and is by far the most traveled of the bay's bridges.

Work began in fall 2020 to rebuild this bridge with separate pedestrian and bicycle lanes, it was completed, and the new southbound span opened, overnight on March 24th 2025. The new bridge span is north of the old bridge. The old southbound bridge was converted to northbound lanes, overnight on July 9th, 2025, taking all traffic off the oldest, and previously northbound span, permanently.

The bridge is often incorrectly referred to as the Howard Franklin Bridge.

== History ==
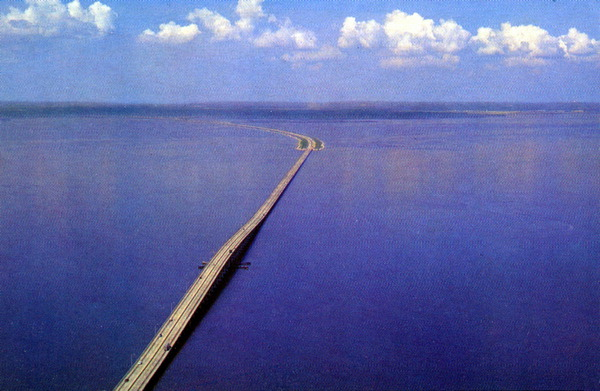
The original span looking west toward St. Petersburg

Named for the man who proposed it, Tampa businessman William Howard Frankland, the bridge opened in April 1960 and carried four lanes (two lanes in each direction separated by a short, narrow barrier). The bridge and approaches cost $16 million. Because of the bridge's design, including its lack of emergency shoulders, it proved to be dangerous. Accidents were common on the bridge and traffic backed up on both sides, leading to local nicknames, the "Howard Frankenstein Bridge" and "The Car-Strangled Spanner".

In 1962, a steel-reinforced tapered concrete barrier was installed "to prevent cars from hurtling the median and crashing into oncoming traffic." Ten people had already died.

Starting in the 1970s, I-275 utilized a bypass designation system. Whenever there would be a major delay at the Howard Frankland Bridge, special signs would alert drivers to the delay and direct them to utilize the bypass, which ran along SR 694 and across the Gandy Bridge, to the Lee Roy Selmon Expressway, Willow Avenue, Howard Avenue, and ending at Interstate 275. Special shields (marked N and S) along the route made sure that drivers were using the correct thoroughfare.

Planning for a larger-capacity replacement began in 1978. Original plans ranged from a large, multi-lane suspension (or similar type) bridge, to two parallel bridges (with the central span reserved for HOV lanes). As traffic projections increased, further exacerbated by a disaster on the Sunshine Skyway Bridge in 1980, it was clear that the new bridge would need to handle at least eight lanes (four in each direction). By 1987, it was concluded that a parallel, four lane span would be built, which would also be less steep and longer than the original structure, the bypass system would also be eliminated from the bridge. Plans were also made to rehabilitate the older bridge after the new bridge opened. Construction began on the new span in 1988. The new $54 million southbound span was opened to traffic in 1990. The older bridge was then closed, rehabilitated, and reopened in 1992.

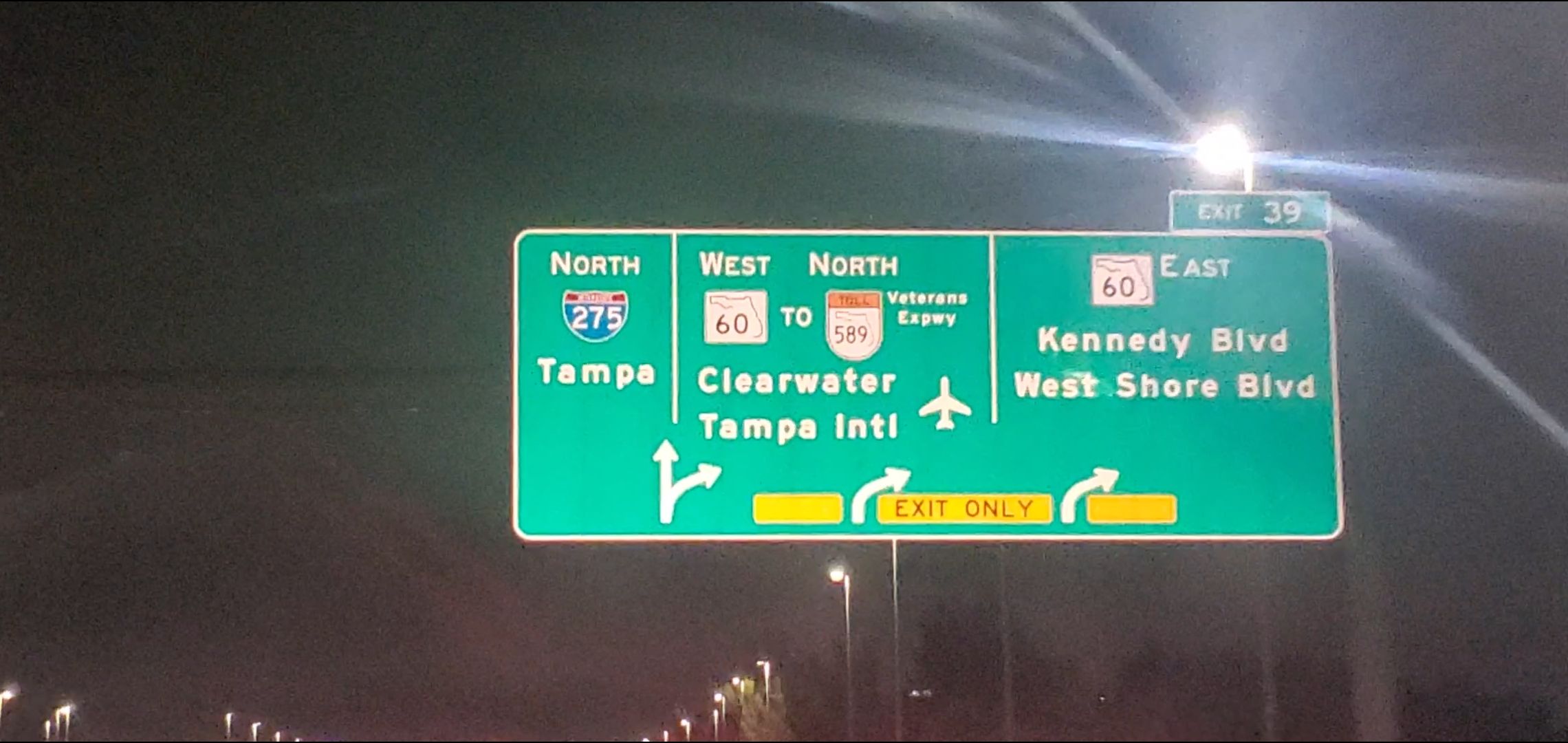
I-275 Northbound approaching Exit 39 with redesigned and updated sign after Howard Frankland Bridge section.

After the widening project in 1992, Interstate 275 was increased to eight lanes on the bridge itself. However, this did not increase capacity on either end of the bridge. Backups were still seen on the Howard Frankland heading into Tampa, primarily due to a bottleneck at the SR 60/Veterans Expressway exit. On the St. Petersburg side, after a comprehensive reconstruction project that took over ten years, lane counts were increased from four lanes prior to the bridge to six lanes through downtown St. Petersburg, and eight lanes from Gandy Boulevard to the bridge.

A reconstruction project was planned to begin in 2017 for the new Gateway Expressway project, a plan to build a new toll road to connect different parts in Pinellas County. However, FDOT planned to reconstruct the interstate in smaller phases rather than the original larger two-phase project and the start of construction was delayed to 2020. Once the reconstruction project finished in 2026, major traffic congestion on the Howard Frankland bridge was significantly reduced by the addition of new lanes. On January 7, 2021, FDOT postponed by a week to January 16, 2021 the start date for removing an overpass and the corresponding exit ramp over I-275. It had been scheduled to shut down by 8 p.m., EST, January 9, through January 10. This work was part of the U.S. $600 million toll road project. On January 16 to 17, 2021, workers removed the 4th Street North interchange bridge (overpass) from 8 p.m. on January 16, to 12 p.m. on January 17. Exit 32 was closed until late 2021 while the new overpass is constructed. Overall construction on this large project began in fall 2020 and completion is expected in spring 2026. The new southbound bridge opened to traffic on March 25th 2025, and northbound traffic was moved to the previously existing southbound bridge on July 9, 2025. The previously existing 1960s northbound bridge will be removed by spring of 2026. The newly built bridge for southbound traffic will include a separate pathway for pedestrian and bicycle traffic, and tolled express lanes for both directions.
