= Interstate 275 (Florida) =

Interstate Highway in Florida

Interstate 275
- I-275 highlighted in red

Route information
- Auxiliary route of I-75
- Maintained by FDOT
- Length: 60.237 mi (96.942 km)
- Existed: 1973–present
- NHS: Entire route

Major junctions
- South end: I-75 near Palmetto
- US 41 near Rubonia; US 19 from Terra Ceia to St. Petersburg; I-175 in St. Petersburg; I-375 in St. Petersburg; SR 690 in St. Petersburg; SR 60 / SR 589 in Tampa; US 92 in Tampa; I-4 in Tampa; US 92 in Tampa
- North end: I-75 near Wesley Chapel

Location
- Country: United States
- State: Florida
- Counties: Manatee, Pinellas, Hillsborough, Pasco

Highway system
- Interstate Highway System; Main; Auxiliary; Suffixed; Business; Future; Florida State Highway System; Interstate; US; State; Former; Pre‑1945; Toll; Scenic
← SR 273	→ SR 276
← US 92	SR 93	→ SR 93A

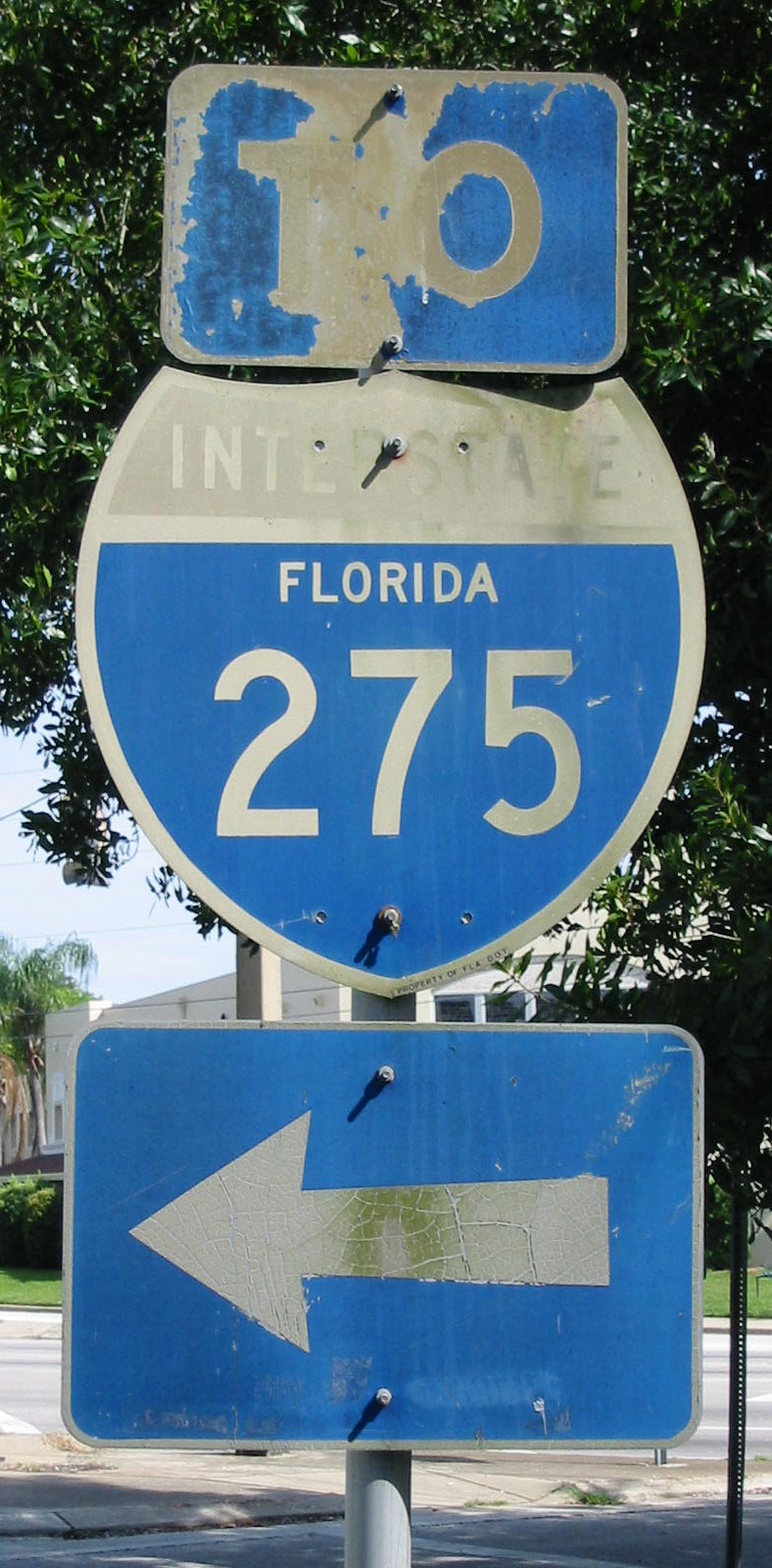
Old I-275 shield in St. Petersburg

Interstate 275 (I-275), located in Florida, is a 60-mile-long (97 km) auxiliary Interstate Highway serving the Tampa Bay area. Its southern terminus is at I-75 near Palmetto, where I-275 heads west towards the Sunshine Skyway Bridge crossing over Tampa Bay. From that point, I-275 passes through St. Petersburg before crossing Tampa Bay again on the Howard Frankland Bridge, then continues through the city of Tampa, where it connects to an interchange with I-4 in Downtown Tampa. After the interchange, I-275 passes north through the Tampa suburbs to its northern terminus at I-75 in Wesley Chapel.

== Route description ==
=== Southern terminus to St. Petersburg ===
I-275 begins at exit 228 of I-75 with two lanes in each direction in rural Palmetto. I-275 immediately heads west of its parent Interstate and has an interchange with US Highway 41 (US 41) two miles (3.2 km) up the road. I-275's next interchange is with US 19, beginning a concurrency that lasts 13 miles (21 km). After this exit, I-275 reaches the southern toll plaza for the Sunshine Skyway Bridge. There is a corresponding northern toll plaza for southbound travelers. The Sunshine Skyway Bridge is a 4.1-mile-long (6.6 km) bridge that spans Tampa Bay. After reaching the northern end of the bridge, I-275 enters St. Petersburg.

=== St. Petersburg ===
At the northern end of the bridge, drivers briefly drive on the left side as the freeway's lanes invert for about half a mile (0.80 km) before US 19 exits the freeway at exit 17, serving as a local road in St. Petersburg. At this point, the Interstate expands to three lanes. I-275 has multiple exits in the city, each of them serving the residential neighborhoods that the freeway passes through. Between exits 22 and 23, the freeway becomes two lanes each way, expanding back to three thereafter. I-275 then has a major interchange with I-175, which provides access to Albert Whitted Airport and Tropicana Field, home of the Tampa Bay Rays. The next major interchange occurs less than a mile (1.6 km) down the road with I-375, providing access to the waterfront along Tampa Bay. After this exit, I-275 continues through residential neighborhoods, widening to four lanes each way between exits 25 and 26, though the right lane in both directions being designated "exit only". It eventually passes beside Sawgrass Lake Park and then through an area of marshland. The freeway widens to four lanes in either direction at exit 30 before reaching its last interchange in St. Petersburg with SR 687 (4th Street). After traveling 19 miles (31 km) in St. Petersburg, I-275 crosses the Howard Frankland Bridge over Old Tampa Bay into Tampa.

=== Tampa ===
I-275 reduces to three lanes in each direction at exit 39, as well as has an interchange with SR 60, which provides access to SR 589 and Tampa International Airport. I-275 widens back to four lanes in each direction after this interchange. I-275 then has an interchange with US 92 (Dale Mabry Highway), the first of two interchanges with the road, allowing access to Raymond James Stadium, Steinbrenner Field, and South Tampa. I-275 then crosses the Hillsborough River for the first time along its route. Afterward, six miles (9.7 km) from its entry into Tampa, I-275 has its next major interchange with I-4, a junction known locally as "Malfunction Junction". This junction was always clogged with daily rush-hour traffic and was subsequently overhauled. This interchange serves as I-4's western terminus and allows access to Orlando and the east coast of Florida. Furthermore, the freeway expands to four lanes through the interchange. After this major exit, I-275 reaches an interchange with US 92 (Hillsborough Avenue) again, allowing access to US 41, the historic Seminole Heights neighborhood, and East Tampa. After this interchange, US 41 (Nebraska Avenue) acts as a parallel local arterial for the freeway throughout the rest of its route through Tampa. I-275 crosses the Hillsborough River a second time and enters residential neighborhoods within Tampa. I-275 travels due north and parallel to US 41 for four miles (6.4 km) before turning northeast toward I-75. At this point, I-275 exits the outskirts of Tampa and enters Lutz, a suburb of Tampa. I-275 then reconnects with its parent Interstate Highway (I-75) and reaches its northern terminus near Wesley Chapel. I-275 is a major highway used as an evacuation route. Due to the importance of this highway, it is important for traffic to flow properly which is why there have been widening projects over the years as the Tampa population continues to increase.

== History ==
=== Initial construction in Tampa ===
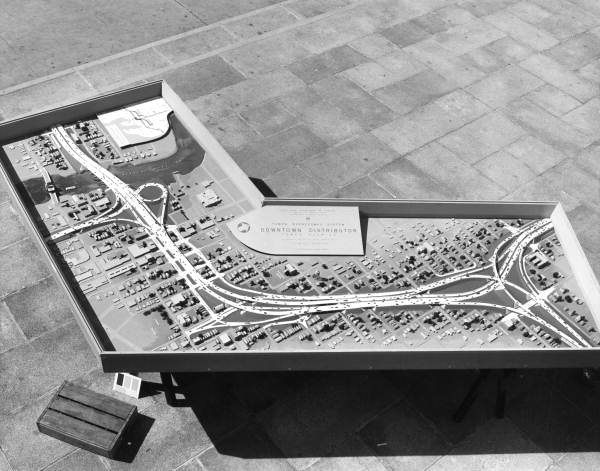
Model of the Downtown Distributor (c. 1960), from Malfunction Junction (right) to Hillsborough River (upper left)

I-275 originally opened in 1962 as a segment of I-75, from the present northern terminus to a diamond interchange at SR 678 (Bearss Avenue). The portion of I-4 that would later become a part of I-275, the Howard Frankland Bridge, and its short freeway stubs at the bridge's endpoints, opened to traffic about a year earlier. In 1964, the stub of what was then known as I-4 between 50th Street (through "Malfunction Junction") and Armenia Avenue was completed. "Malfunction Junction's" northern end was a pair of ramp stubs that would later be filled in by I-75. In 1965, the segment of I-75 from "Malfunction Junction" to about Sligh Avenue was completed, and, by 1967, the remaining gaps in I-4 and I-75 were filled and opened to traffic. When I-275 was built it split Tampa cutting through historic and ethnic neighborhoods. A local citizen, Josh Frank, initiated #blvdtampa movement, which advocates removing I-275 and building a boulevard instead.

=== Controversy and repeated delays in Pinellas ===
Around 1970, plans for the extension of I-75 into Pinellas County began. However, the first round of local opposition would lead to the eventual (and repeated) delays of I-75 through St. Petersburg. The first setback was led by 4th Street business owners and residents who demanded that construction on I-75 be stopped, since the bridge was already funneling unwanted traffic into the corridor. It has since seen many unforeseen business and residential booms due to the building of this bridge. At the same time, construction began on I-75 from SR 686 (Roosevelt Boulevard) to about 38th Avenue North. By this time, I-4 was truncated to "Malfunction Junction", allowing the I-75 designation to take over the freeway from the junction to 4th Street North. This segment was opened to traffic in 1973, with the gap between Roosevelt and 9th Street filled in a few years later. Around this time, I-75 was redesignated as I-275, and, after some more local opposition, I-275 was constructed to meander down to SR 595 (5th Avenue North), near downtown St. Petersburg, in 1975.

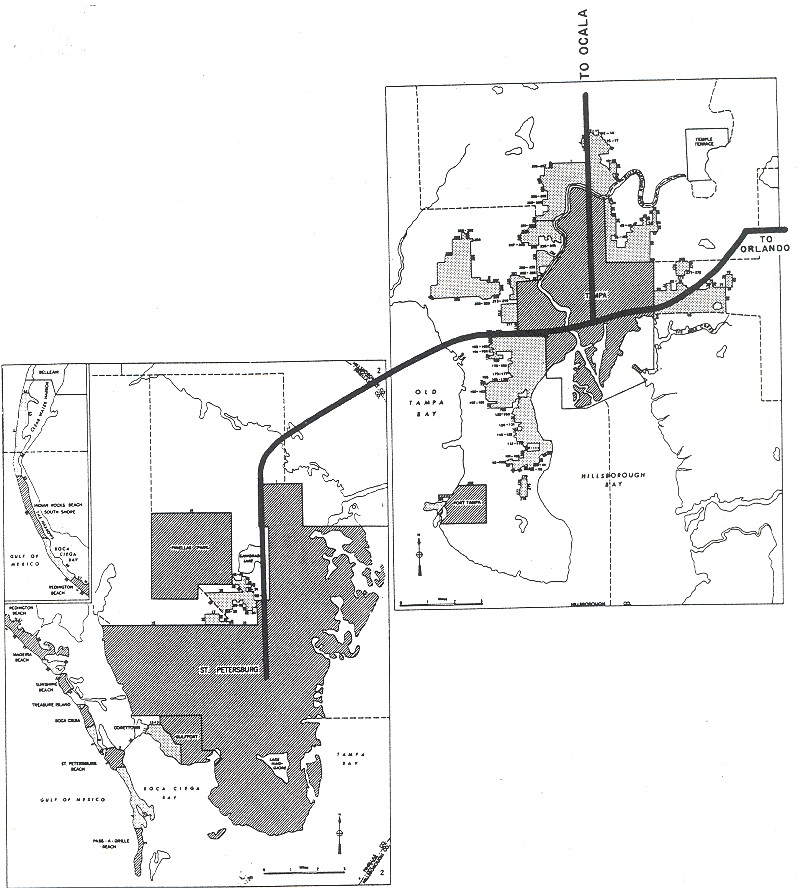
The original plans called for I-75 to end in Tampa.

The construction of I-275 over nearly a 50-year period between 1970 and 2016 uprooted many Black families in the Methodist Town, Gas Plant, and 22nd Street neighborhoods. These practices of eminent domain by the St. Petersburg government helped to shut down small companies in these neighborhoods and sustained white businesses that were located more centrally. Families in the Gas Plant neighborhood were assured good jobs at Tropicana Field to help ease the burden of moving. During the 1970s, the government removed 285 buildings and 500 families to help build the Interstate which cost $11.3 million (equivalent to $72.2 million in 2025). The widespread demolition included 10 Black-American churches. The families in the bulldozed Gas Plant neighborhood were guaranteed cheaper homes and 600 new jobs by the city, but these offers were never delivered.

The segment of I-275 between Memorial Highway (SR 60) and Himes Avenue was widened from four to six lanes in 1974. Additionally, a median barrier was built along the freeway from Himes Avenue to Downtown Tampa.

Many members in the affected neighborhoods found the actions taken by the government to be very controversial. In 1977, Chester James was appointed by the city government as the representative from Methodist Town to vote on the future development plans of his neighborhood. However, the city's unclear plans led him to vote in favor of evicting 377 families (including his own) from the neighborhood. There is also contention about the location of I-275 in southwest St. Petersburg, as its current placement is very similar to that of the 1935 segregation initiative perimeter.

Financial burdens through this part of the project caused further delays. However, I-375 opened partially to traffic in 1979, with full operation by 1981, and I-175 opened up in 1980.

With both downtown feeders now open, I-275 was extended to 28th Street South. However, another round of community revolts delayed the segment of I-275 between 28th Street South and 22nd Avenue South. In spite of the delay, the stretch was built by 1981. Exit 20 was configured for an anticipated westward expansion to a planned Pinellas Beltway. A freeway revolt killed many of Pinellas County's freeways during the 1970s and repeatedly delayed the construction of I-275. In addition, the Sunshine Skyway Bridge collapse on May 9, 1980, during which the freighter MV Summit Venture took down one of the two spans of the Sunshine Skyway Bridge and killed 35 people, reduced that future portion of I-275 to two lanes until the opening of the present bridge in April 1987.

In 1982, the segment between 22nd Avenue South and 39th Avenue South was opened to traffic. The Pinellas Bayway/US 19 interchange, opened to traffic in 1983–1984, is inverted for about half a mile (0.80 km). The reason for this configuration is unknown; however, to this day, traffic continues to flow smoothly through the interchange with very little congestion. At about the same time this interchange opened, I-275 was complete.

=== Reconstruction and later changes ===
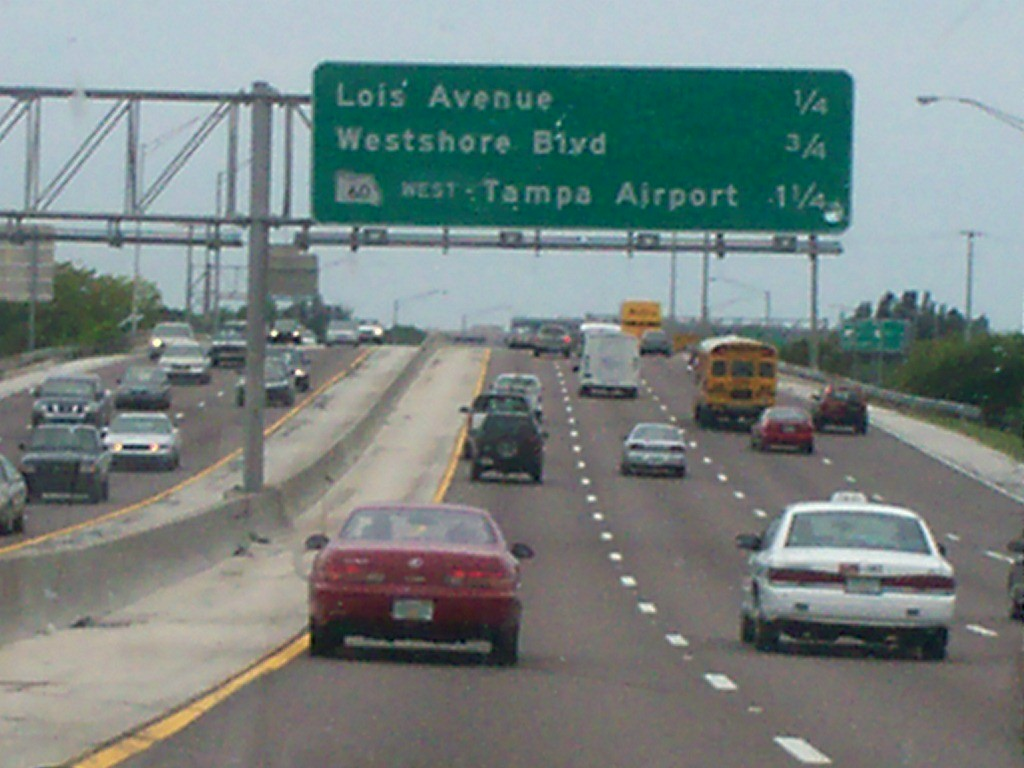
I-275 just leaving Dale Mabry Highway/US-92 heading south toward Tampa International Airport

In 1984, the Himes Avenue exit/entrance was constructed. The exit was originally rumored to supplement a failed redevelopment project in the area during that time. Today, the Himes Avenue connection serves as reliever for nearby Raymond James Stadium.

When the new Sunshine Skyway Bridge opened in 1987, the portion had been restored to four lanes.

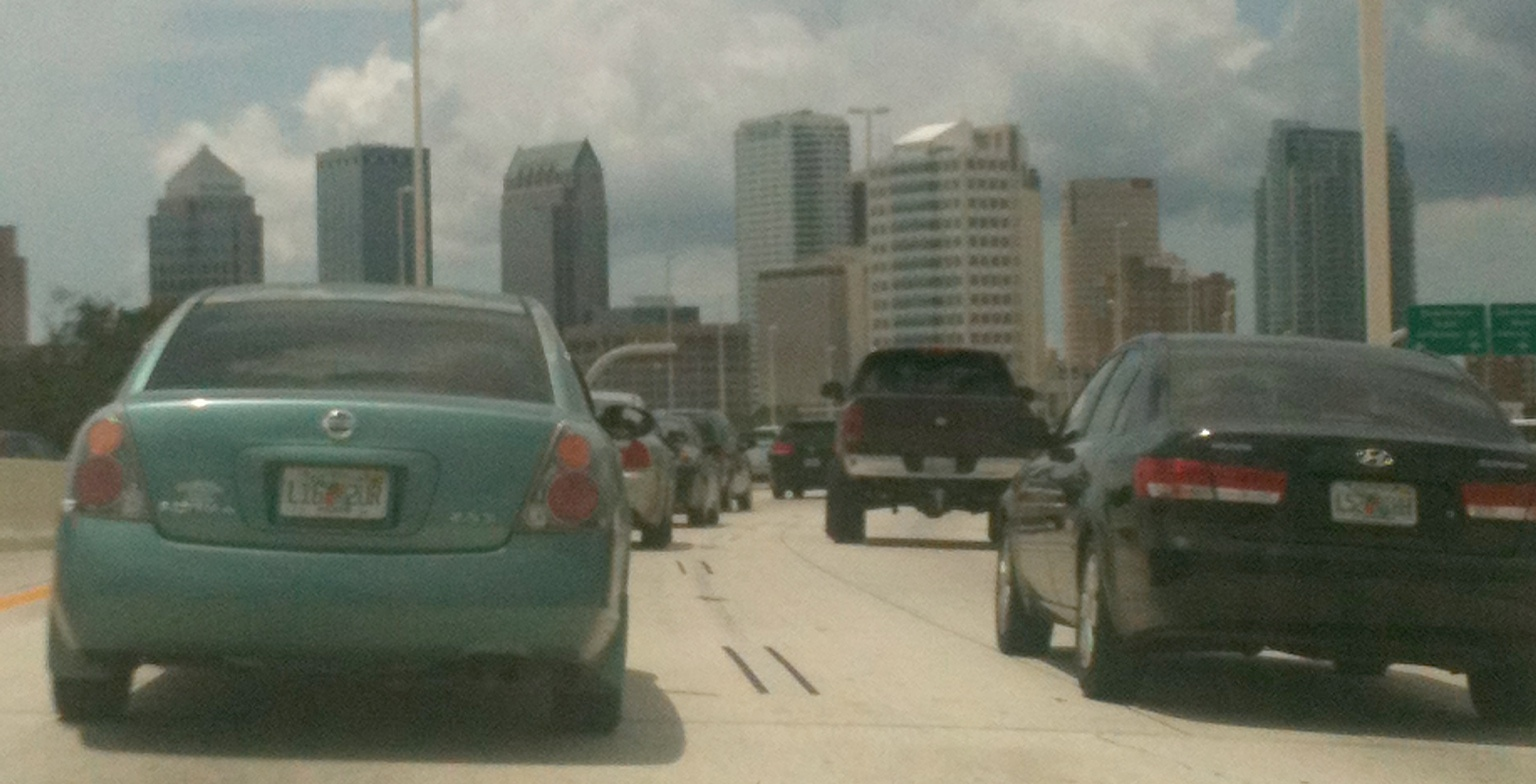
I-275 entering Downtown Tampa

As originally built, the Memorial Highway/Westshore interchange was only a half diamond, and the West Shore Boulevard interchange was a full diamond. However, by 1990, both interchanges had undergone drastic changes to allow safe, free-flowing movement to and from Tampa International Airport, the Courtney Campbell Causeway, and the future Veterans Expressway. Among the improvements were three free-flowing exit and entry ramps for Memorial Highway from I-275. The exit ramp from I-275 south to Memorial Highway was reconstructed into a directional ramp towards Memorial Highway northbound, the entry ramp from Memorial Highway onto northbound I-275 was removed, and an entry ramp from southbound Memorial Highway to southbound I-275 was constructed. The two western ramps on the nearby West Shore Boulevard interchange were also removed (truncating the West Shore interchange to a half diamond) in order to limit accidents via traffic weave caused by traffic entering and exiting the aforementioned Memorial Highway interchange.

In 1991, the expansion of the Howard Frankland Bridge and 4th Street North interchange was completed.

In 1994, the two drawbridges on the northern approach to the Sunshine Skyway Bridge, dating to the original twin Sunshine Skyway bridges, were replaced with high-level fixed spans, eliminating bottlenecks caused by openings.

The northern toll plaza to the Sunshine Skyway Bridge was relocated south of the approach bridge in 2000 due to a lack of capacity. The original plaza only allowed three lanes, while the replacement allows six lanes to flow through, with the sixth lane dedicated to SunPass users.

In 1999, a much needed, dual-stage, widening project began between SR 580 (Busch Boulevard) and Bearss Avenue. The project widened I-275 mainline from four to six lanes, rehabilitated the existing concrete surfaces, and improved interchange flow, lighting, signage, and drainage. The project was completed in 2003.

In 2004, the ramp from southbound Memorial Highway to southbound I-275 was realigned in order to ease congestion on the mainline lanes of the Interstate.

In 2001, the widening project for I-275 between SR 694 (Gandy Boulevard) and SR 686 began. The project increased I-275 from six to eight lanes, and its existing concrete surfaces were rehabilitated. A reconfiguration of the SR 686 interchange (exit 30) started in 2001 and added access to 118th Avenue North at the same interchange. The new connection to 118th Avenue North is the first phase of a proposed freeway to connect I-275 to the Bayside Bridge (although it is unclear if future segments will be built). All construction in this area was completed by 2002. Reconstruction of I-275 between SR 686 and SR 687 quickly followed the widening project. Lane counts on I-275 were increased from four to mostly six lanes (with some eight-lane segments). The Ulmerton Road and 9th Street North interchanges were originally narrow 1959 configurations that caused much congestion in the area. Additionally, the 9th Street North/Martin Luther King Jr. Street North exit and Ulmerton Road entrance ramps were situated in the left lane of I-275, causing dangerous weaving patterns. These interchanges were reconstructed into right-lane configurations, and two new ramps were added from Ulmerton Road (one leading to 9th Street North and one exiting onto southbound I-275). The southbound I-275 exits to Ulmerton Road and Martin Luther King Jr. Street North were combined into one exit ramp to provide better flow. The Martin Luther King Jr. Street North interchange was shut down for several months as a result of the reconstruction. Finally, the ramps to and from 118th Avenue North were opened to traffic. The entire reconstruction project along I-275 in the Gateway area was completed by 2005.

In November 2005, the Florida Legislature dedicated the section of I-275 in Pinellas County as the "St. Petersburg Parkway/William C. Cramer Memorial Highway". William Cato Cramer was a native of St. Petersburg who served as a member of the Florida Legislature from 1955 through 1971. He helped to procure the building of I-275 through Pinellas County.

In 2003 operational improvements began for the notorious "Malfunction Junction" in Downtown Tampa. The project consisted of widening mainline I-275 and I-4, along with an array of ramp and bridge improvements, lighting and drainage work, and new signs. The entire project was completed on December 22, 2006, with intelligent transportation system (ITS) components installed by March 2007. The renovation of the I-4 corridor through Ybor City was finished around mid-2007, almost one year ahead of schedule.

In January 2011, construction began on widening the northernmost segment of I-275 from US 41 (Nebraska Avenue) to the I-75 apex from four to six lanes. The project also includes constructing a dedicated flyover ramp over I-75 towards SR 56. This ramp, along with a new, extended ramp from I-75 to SR 56, opened on August 18, 2011.

On February 4, 2011, a new ramp connecting northbound I-275 to 118th Avenue North opened. This project, beginning in July 2009 and involving widening the existing ramp from northbound I-275 to SR 686, is being performed in conjunction with the project to build the Mid Pinellas Expressway, which has suffered numerous delays due to a lack of funding.

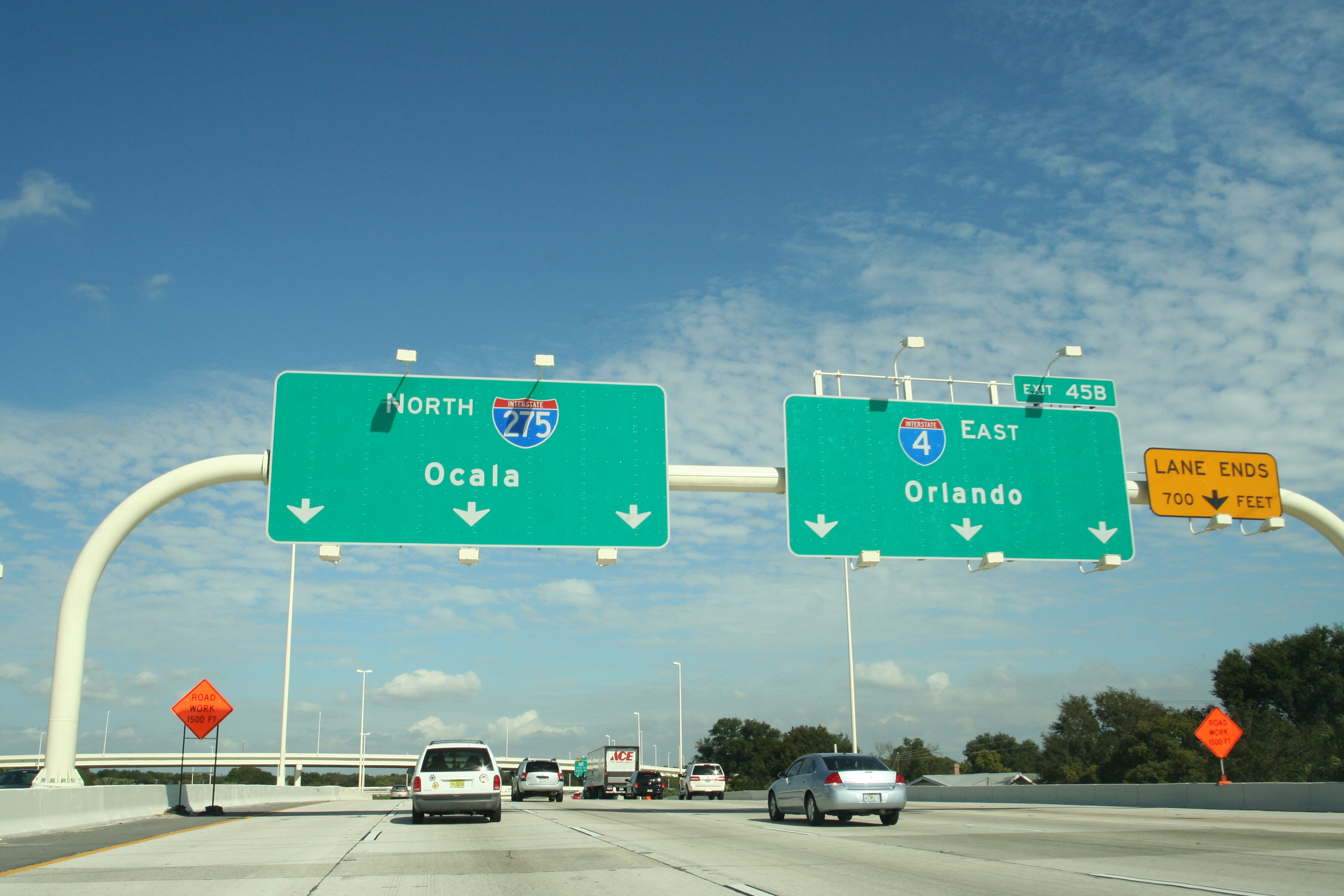
I-275 at "Malfunction Junction"

The staged reconstruction project for I-275 between the Howard Frankland Bridge and Downtown Tampa was supposed to begin in mid-2006. However, bids received by the Florida Department of Transportation (FDOT) for the project came in at $100 million (40 percent) over the projected estimates, which was blamed on the rising cost of asphalt and other materials, which was, in turn, partly blamed on the rising oil prices worldwide. As a result, FDOT commenced with the project in four smaller phases, rather than the original, large-scale, two-phase project. Construction began on phase one, the northbound lanes (south of the existing interstate) between Himes Avenue and Downtown Tampa, on August 13, 2007, and was completed in April 2010. Phase two, which includes construction of the northbound lanes from the Westshore area to Himes, was originally scheduled to begin in 2008 but was delayed further. The third phase will consist of transferring northbound traffic onto the new northbound lanes, southbound traffic onto the existing northbound lanes, and the construction of the new southbound lanes from Himes to downtown. Finally, the fourth and final phase will construct the new southbound lanes from the Westshore area to Himes. The project also reconfigured the Dale Mabry Highway (US-92) and Lois Avenue interchanges. The Dale Mabry Highway interchange was converted from a partial cloverleaf into a diamond interchange. The offramp from southbound I-275 to Lois Avenue was relocated to access Lois Avenue via Cypress Street and flyover ramps were also constructed in order to limit traffic weave between the two interchanges. The entire project was originally scheduled to be completed by around 2013 or 2014, but it was extended until early 2015 and costed an estimated $540 million (equivalent to $716 million in 2025), an increase from the original $350-million (equivalent to $464 million in 2025)budget. Finally, on June 28, 2016, the fourth and final phase was finished with the new lanes finally opening, ending the long term project in Tampa.

In 2020, the Memorial Highway interchange was reconfigured and widened I-275 to three lanes throughout the length of the interchange.

A reconstruction project was planned to begin on the Howard Frankland Bridge in 2017 for the new Gateway Expressway project, a plan to build a new toll road to connect different parts in Pinellas County. However, FDOT planned to reconstruct the interstate in smaller phases rather than the original larger two-phase project and the start of construction was delayed to 2020. Once the reconstruction project is finished in 2025, major traffic congestion on the Howard Frankland bridge is expected to be significantly reduced by the addition of new lanes. On January 7, 2021, FDOT postponed by a week to January 16, 2021 the start date for removing an overpass and the corresponding exit ramp over I-275. It had been scheduled to shut down by 8 p.m., EST, January 9, through January 10. This work was part of the U.S. $600 million toll road project. On January 16 to 17, 2021, workers removed the 4th street north interchange bridge (overpass) from 8 p.m. on January 16, to 12 p.m. on January 17. Exit 32 was closed until late 2021 while the new overpass is constructed. Overall construction on this large project began in fall 2020 and completion is expected in late 2025. A completely new bridge will carry southbound traffic. Once that bridge is completed, the existing southbound bridge will be converted to carry northbound traffic. When all traffic is moved to the final alignment, the existing northbound bridge will be removed. The newly built bridge for southbound traffic will include a separate pathway for pedestrian and bicycle traffic, and additional vehicle traffic lanes. Many projects have been completed and include many enhancements such as reduced traffic congestion, upgraded lighting, better markings, and modernized traffic signs increasing visibility.

=== Other improvements ===
Other sections not requiring a full-scale reconstruction have undergone improvements:

- Concrete rehabilitation from 62nd Avenue North to exit 17 in Pinellas County, complete, 2001–2005
- Resurfacing from the Howard Frankland Bridge to Himes Avenue (exit 41C), complete, 2002
- Resurfacing from the US 41 overpass (exit 53) to I-75 junction in Lutz, complete, 2003
- Resurfacing from the Howard Frankland Bridge to SR 687, complete, 2006
- Concrete rehabilitation/bridge upgrade/lighting improvements from "Malfunction Junction" to Busch Boulevard, complete, 2007
- Concrete rehabilitation from 26th Avenue North to exit 23, complete, 2008
- Rehabilitation at exit 28, complete, 2008
- Resurfacing between exit 17 to the Misner Bridge in Pinellas County (currently ongoing)
- Widening of the northbound exit ramp at exit 51 in Hillsborough County, complete, 2012
- Bridge reconstruction at SR 687 at exit 32 southbound, complete, 2024
- Widening project on I-275 in Pinellas begins, 2025.

== Services ==
I-275 has two rest areas, one at each end of the Sunshine Skyway Bridge. Both rest areas, each accessible by traffic in both directions, have rest rooms, vending machines, picnic tables, dog walk areas, and nighttime security. These rest areas also provide access to the fishing piers, for an extra fee.

== Exit list ==
County	Location	mi	km	Old exit	New exit	Destinations	Notes
Manatee		0.0	0.0	0	0	I-75 – Naples, Tampa	Exit 228 (I-75)
Manatee		2.2	3.5	1	2	US 41 – Palmetto, Bradenton	To Port Manatee, Bradenton Area Convention Center
Manatee	Terra Ceia	4.7	7.6	2	5	US 19 south – Palmetto, Bradenton	South end of the overlap with US 19; southbound exit and northbound entrance
Manatee	Terra Ceia	5.8	9.3	South Toll Plaza (northbound only)			
Manatee		6.9	11.1	2A	—	South Skyway Fishing Pier; Rest Area	
Tampa Bay		8.0– 12.1	12.9– 19.5	Sunshine Skyway Bridge			
Pinellas	St. Petersburg	12.9	20.8	2B	—	North Skyway Fishing Pier; Rest Area	
Pinellas	St. Petersburg	13.5– 13.8	21.7– 22.2	Structure B over Bunces Pass			
Pinellas	St. Petersburg	14.7	23.7	Scenic View (northbound only)			
Pinellas	St. Petersburg	15.1	24.3	North Toll Plaza (southbound only)			
Pinellas	St. Petersburg	15.5– 16.1	24.9– 25.9	Structure A over the Gulf Intracoastal Waterway			
Pinellas	St. Petersburg	16.9	27.2	3	16	Skyway Ln / Pinellas Point Dr	
Pinellas	St. Petersburg	17.4	28.0	4	17	US 19 north / SR 682 west (Pinellas Bayway) / 54th Ave S – St. Pete Beach	North end of the overlap with US 19; northbound left exit; To Eckerd College, Fort De Soto Park
Pinellas	St. Petersburg	19.4	31.2	5	18	26th Ave S	Northbound exit and southbound entrance; To Stetson University College of Law
Pinellas	St. Petersburg	19.6	31.5	6	19	22nd Ave S	Southbound exit and northbound entrance
Pinellas	St. Petersburg	20.3	32.7	7	20	31st St S	Northbound exit and southbound entrance (both on the left side)
Pinellas	St. Petersburg	20.6	33.2	8	21	28th St S	Southbound exit and northbound entrance
Pinellas	St. Petersburg	21.6	34.8	9	22	I-175 east – Tropicana Field	Access to Bayfront Health St. Petersburg; To Albert Whitted Airport
Pinellas	St. Petersburg	22.4	36.0	10	23 (NB) 23A (SB)	I-375 east – Sundial, The Pier	Signed as exit 23 northbound
Pinellas	St. Petersburg	22.4	36.0	11	23B	SR 595 (5th Ave N)	Southbound exit and northbound entrance; access to St. Anthony's Hospital
Pinellas	St. Petersburg	23.4	37.7	12	24	22nd Ave N	
Pinellas	St. Petersburg	24.4	39.3	13	25	38th Ave N	
Pinellas	St. Petersburg	25.4	40.9	14	26A-B (NB) 26 (SB)	54th Ave N	Signed as exits 26A (EASTBOUND) and 26B (WESTBOUND) northbound; access to Northside Hospital
Pinellas	St. Petersburg					I-275 Express north	Southern terminus of the express lanes; Opened in 2024
Pinellas	St. Petersburg	27.6	44.4	15	28	SR 694 (Gandy Blvd) – Pinellas Park (NB) SR 694 west (Gandy Blvd) – Pinellas Park (SB)	No access from I-275 south to SR 694 east or SR 694 west to I-275 north
Pinellas	St. Petersburg	29.6	47.6	16	30	SR 686 (Roosevelt Blvd) / SR 690 west (Gateway Expwy) to US 19 / 118th Ave N – St Pete - Clwtr Intl	
Pinellas	St. Petersburg					SR 690 west (Gateway Expwy) to US 19	Express lane interchange; southbound exit and northbound entrance
Pinellas	St. Petersburg	30.7	49.4	17	31	Dr Martin Luther King Jr St	Southbound exit and northbound entrance; formerly exit 31A
Pinellas	St. Petersburg	30.9	49.7	18	31	SR 688 west (Ulmerton Rd)	No northbound exit; formerly exit 31B
Pinellas	St. Petersburg					I-275 Express south	Current northern terminus of the express lanes
Pinellas	St. Petersburg	31.5	50.7	19	32	SR 687 south (4th St N) to US 92	Southbound exit and northbound entrance. Reopened in March 2024 after bridge replacements on 4th Street North
Old Tampa Bay		33.7– 36.8	54.2– 59.2	Howard Frankland Bridge			
Hillsborough	Tampa	38.4	61.8	20A	39	SR 60 east (Kennedy Blvd) / CR 587 (Westshore Blvd)	Northbound exit and southbound entrance; formerly exit 39A; To WestShore Plaza
Hillsborough	Tampa	38.9	62.6	20	39	SR 60 west / SR 589 north (Veterans Expwy) – Clearwater, Tampa Intl,	formerly exit 39B (old 20B) northbound
Hillsborough	Tampa	39.4	63.4	21	40A	Westshore Blvd	Southbound exit and northbound entrance
Hillsborough	Tampa	40.0	64.4	22	40B	Lois Ave / International Plaza	Southbound exit to westbound Cypress Street.; International Plaza signed northbound; To Raymond James Stadium, New York Yankees George M. Steinbrenner Field
Hillsborough	Tampa	40.056	64.464			I-275 Express south	Future northern terminus of the express lanes
Hillsborough	Tampa	40.6	65.3	23	41A	US 92 (Dale Mabry Hwy)	A partial cloverleaf interchange with two exits until 2013. Formerly Exits 41A and 41B (2002-2013) and Exit 41A-B (2013-2015).; To Raymond James Stadium, New York Yankees George M. Steinbrenner Field, Hillsborough Comm College, MacDill AFB
Hillsborough	Tampa	40.9	65.8	23C	41B	Himes Ave	Southbound exit (Exit 41C from 2002-2015) and northbound entrance
Hillsborough	Tampa	41.9	67.4	24	42	Armenia Ave, Howard Ave	Access to Memorial Hospital of Tampa; West Tampa Historic District
Hillsborough	Tampa	43.2	69.5	25	44	Downtown West (Ashley Dr, Tampa St) / Downtown East (Scott St)	Northbound exit and southbound entrance. Former southbound exit to Downtown West (Ashley Drive, Tampa Street) consolidated into Exit 45A; To Performing Arts Ctr, Convention Ctr
Hillsborough	Tampa	43.6	70.2	26	45A	Downtown East (Jefferson St), Downtown West (Ashley Dr, Tampa St)	Southbound exit and northbound entrance; signed as "Downtown East–West". Exit has ramps from both I-275 and I-4 (signed "Exit 45A"); To Amalie Arena, The Florida Aquarium, Port Tampa Bay, Performing Arts Ctr, Convention Ctr
Hillsborough	Tampa	44.2	71.1	27	45B	I-4 east – Orlando	Interchange commonly known as Malfunction Junction; western terminus of I-4
Hillsborough	Tampa	44.6	71.8	28	46A	Floribraska Ave	Southbound exit and northbound entrance
Hillsborough	Tampa	45.4	73.1	29	46B	SR 574 (Dr Martin Luther King Jr Blvd)	Access to St. Joseph's Hospital, St. Joseph's Children's Hospital, and St. Joseph's Women's Hospital; To Raymond James Stadium, New York Yankees George M. Steinbrenner Field
Hillsborough	Tampa	46.4	74.7	30	47A-B (NB) 47 (SB)	US 92 (Hillsborough Ave) (NB) US 92 (Hillsborough Ave) to US 41 south (SB)	Signed as exits 47A (EAST) and 47B (WEST) northbound
Hillsborough	Tampa	47.4	76.3	31	48	Sligh Ave	To ZooTampa
Hillsborough	Tampa	48.2	77.6	32	49	Bird St, Waters Ave	Northbound exit and southbound entrance
Hillsborough	Tampa	48.9	78.7	33	50	SR 580 (Busch Blvd) – Temple Terrace	Folded diamond interchange; access to Busch Gardens
Hillsborough	Tampa	50.4	81.1	34	51	SR 582 (Fowler Ave) – Univ South Florida (NB) SR 582 (Fowler Ave) – Temple Terrace (SB)	To Museum of Science & Industry (Tampa), University Mall (Florida)
Hillsborough	Lake Magdalene–University line	51.4	82.7	35	52	CR 582A (Fletcher Ave) (NB) CR 582A (Fletcher Ave) – Univ South Florida (SB)	Access to AdventHealth Tampa
Hillsborough	Lake Magdalene–Nowatney line	52.7	84.8	36	53	SR 678 (Bearss Ave)	
Hillsborough	Lutz	59.4	95.6	—	59	SR 56 – Land o' Lakes, Tarpon Springs	single northbound ramp that merges with I-75 exit 275; To AdventHealth Center Ice Sports Complex and Pasco–Hernando State College
Pasco	Wesley Chapel	60.2	96.9	—	—	I-75 north – Ocala	Exit 274 (I-75)
1.000 mi = 1.609 km; 1.000 km = 0.621 mi: Closed/former; Concurrency terminus; Electronic toll collection; Incomplete access; Unopened

== See also ==
- Traffic Patterns
