= List of Interstate Highways in Florida =

Interstate Highways of the Florida State Highway System
- Markers in use for Interstate Highways in Florida
- Interstate Highways highlighted in red

System information
- Length: 1,494.87 mi (2,405.76 km)
- Formed: June 29, 1956

Highway names
- Interstates: Interstate X (I-X)
- US Highways: U.S. Highway X (US X)
- State: State Road X (SR X)

System links
- Florida State Highway System; Interstate; US; State; Former; Pre‑1945; Toll; Scenic

The Interstate Highways in the state of Florida are owned and maintained by the Florida Department of Transportation (FDOT). There are four primary interstate highways and eight auxiliary highways, with a ninth proposed, totaling 1,497.58 miles (2,410.12 km) interstate miles in Florida. The longest interstate is I-75, extending 470.678 miles (757.483 km), and the shortest is I-395, extending just 1.292 miles (2.079 km).

== Primary Interstates ==
Number	Length (mi)	Length (km)	Southern or western terminus	Northern or eastern terminus	Formed	Removed	Notes
I-4	132.298	212.913	I-275 in Tampa	I-95 in Daytona Beach	1957	current	
I-10	362.262	583.004	I-10 at Alabama state line	I-95 in Jacksonville	1958	current	
I-75	470.678	757.483	SR 826 in Hialeah	I-75 at Georgia state line	1958	current	
I-75E	45.4	73.1	I-75 near Palmetto	I-75 in Wesley Chapel	1968	1972	Former designation for eastern bypass of Tampa when I-75 went through St. Petersburg, later swapped with I-275
I-95	382.083	614.903	US 1 in Miami	I-95 at St. Mary's River	1957	current	
Former

== Auxiliary Interstates ==
Number	Length (mi)	Length (km)	Southern or western terminus	Northern or eastern terminus	Formed	Removed	Notes
I-110	6.341	10.205	US 90/US 98 in Pensacola	I-10 north of Pensacola	1969	current	
I-175	1.440	2.317	I-275 in St. Petersburg	SR 687 in St. Petersburg	1980	current	
I-275	60.696	97.681	I-75 near Palmetto	I-75 in Wesley Chapel	1973	current	
I-375	1.340	2.157	I-275 in St. Petersburg	US 19 Alt./SR 595 in St. Petersburg	1979	current	
I-195	4.424	7.120	I-95/SR 112 in Miami	SR 907A/SR 112 in Miami Beach	1959	current	
I-295	60.864	97.951	Beltway loop located in Jacksonville		1967	current	
I-395	1.292	2.079	I-95 in Miami	SR A1A in Miami	1971	current	
I-595	12.860	20.696	I-75 on Weston–Sunrise–Davie tripoint	Eller Drive in Fort Lauderdale	1990	current	
I-795	7.5	12.1	I-95 in Jacksonville	I-295 in Jacksonville	proposed	—	Signed as State Road 9B
Proposed and unbuilt
