= Pinellas =

Peninsula in Florida, United States

Coordinates: 27.876394°N 82.7778579°W

Location of Pinellas County, Florida

Pinellas is a peninsula located roughly halfway down the west coast of Florida. It forms the western boundary of Tampa Bay and comprises the bulk of Pinellas County. There is a city named Pinellas Park in south Pinellas. The peninsula is bounded on the north by Pasco County, Florida, on the northeast by Hillsborough County, and on the east and south by Tampa Bay. It is bounded on the west by the Intracoastal Waterway and the Gulf of Mexico. The Pinellas peninsula connects to the south with Manatee County via the Sunshine Skyway Bridge and connects with Hillsborough County on the east via the Courtney Campbell Causeway, the Howard Frankland Bridge, and the Gandy Bridge.

== Overview ==
The name derives from punta pinal ("point of pines") named by Spanish conquistador Pánfilo de Narváez in 1528. The first settlers in the area include Antonio Maximo Hernandez, the McMullen family and Odet Philippe. Maximo Point is the location of Maximo's fishing camp. McMullen's descendants still live in the area. Philippe Park, a Pinellas County park, and the Philippe Parkway were named for Philippe. Now highly urbanized, the peninsula was once renowned for its wildlife, including the American black bear, the Florida panther, and many species of birds.

Pinellas County is the most densely populated county in Florida. There are 3,347 inhabitants per square mile (1,292/km^{2}) in Pinellas County.
