= Poorman =

Poorman may refer to:

- Poorman, Alaska, unincorporated community in the Yukon-Koyukuk Census Area of the Unorganized Borough of the U.S. state of Alaska
- PoorMan, light-weight web server bundled with the BeOS and Haiku operating system
- "Poorman", song by Depeche Mode from Spirit
- The Poorman or Jim Trenton, American radio broadcaster
- New Zealand grapefruit also known as the Poorman, Poorman orange, poorman's orange, poor man's orange, and goldfruit

== People with the surname Poorman ==
- Christian L. Poorman (1825–1912), American politician
- Mark L. Poorman, American theologian and academic administrator
- Tom Poorman (1857–1905), American baseball player

== See also ==
- Poor Man (disambiguation)
