= Safety Harbor site =

Archaeological site in Florida, United States

- Safety Harbor Site
- U.S. National Register of Historic Places
- U.S. National Historic Landmark
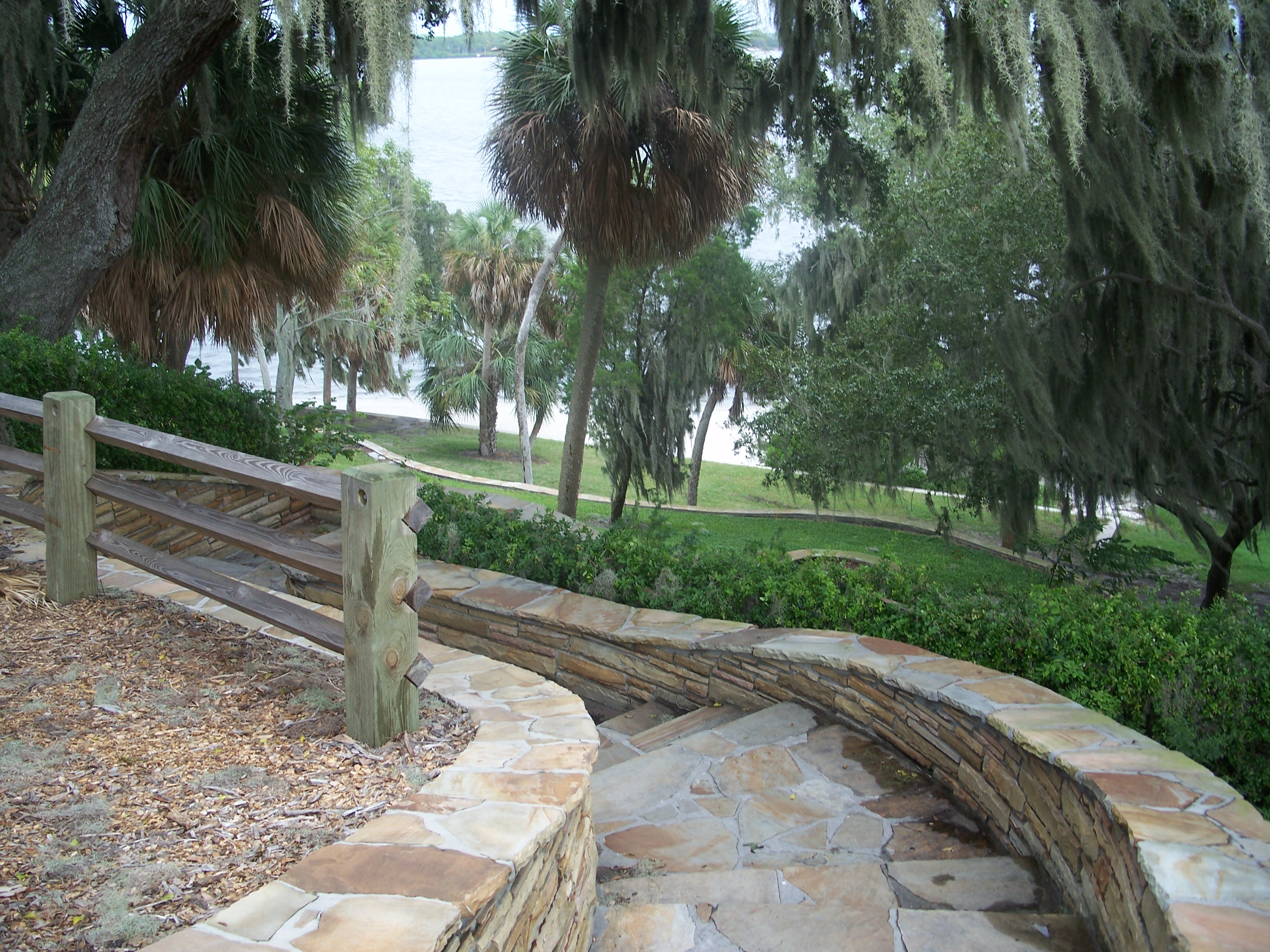
- Looking down from the top of the site

- Location within Florida Location within the United States
- Location: Safety Harbor, Florida
- Coordinates: 28°00′32″N 82°40′39″W
- Area: 2 acres (0.81 ha)
- NRHP reference No.: 66000270

Significant dates
- Added to NRHP: October 15, 1966
- Designated NHL: July 19, 1964

The Safety Harbor Site is an archaeological site in Philippe Park at 2525 Philippe Parkway in Safety Harbor, Florida, United States. It represents the site of Tocobaga, the capital of the Native American people also known as Tocobaga in the 16th century. It is the type site for the Safety Harbor culture, and includes the largest remaining mound in the Tampa Bay area. It was designated a National Historic Landmark in 1964.

== Description ==
The Safety Harbor Site is a major feature of Philippe Park. The site consists of the large temple mound, one smaller burial mound and two shell middens. The temple mound is roughly circular, 150 feet (46 m) in diameter and 20 feet (6.1 m) in height, with a summit plateau measuring about 100 by 50 feet (30 m × 15 m). It is built out of a series layers, alternating shells and sand. Archaeologists have uncovered features interpreted as post holes in the summit area, suggestive that a structure once stood there, either a residence or temple structure. There are also layers of clay, which are thought to represent levels that may have also been used in some way.

The site is open to visitors during the daylight hours. In addition to the mounds, the park has walking paths, picnic areas, a boat ramp, fishing, and scenic views.

== Archaeological significance ==
The site was documented as being occupied by early Spanish explorers of the region, who described it as the capital city of the Tocobaga people. Contact with these explorers probably introduced European diseases, which decimated the population and led to the site's abandonment, probably by 1700. It was first brought to the attention of archaeologists as early as 1880, but the first formal excavations took place only in 1929. Twentieth-century excavations, both sanctioned and illegal, resulted in the complete excavation of a burial mound which stood nearby. The county acquired the property in 1948, and has conducted investigations into the site since then.

The site is the southernmost in Florida that exhibits the influence of Mississippian culture. Pottery finds at the site share characteristics with the contemporaneous Fort Walton culture.

== See also ==
- List of National Historic Landmarks in Florida
- National Register of Historic Places listings in Pinellas County, Florida
- Odet Philippe
