= Poor Man =

Poor Man may refer to:

- New Zealand grapefruit also known as the Poorman, Poorman orange, poorman's orange, poor man's orange, and goldfruit

== Music ==
- "Poor Man", song by Odetta from the 1962 album Sometimes I Feel Like Cryin'
- "Poor Man", song sung by Eric Burdon on the 1985 album That's Live, written by Woodie Guthrie
- "Poor Man", song by Depeche Mode from the 2017 album Spirit

== See also ==
- PoorMan light-weight web server bundled with the BeOS and Haiku operating system.
- Poorman (disambiguation)
