= George Miscovich =

American politician (1916–1999)

George J. Miscovich

21 Speaker of the Alaska House of Representatives
- In office 1953–1955
- Preceded by: William A. Egan
- Succeeded by: Wendell P. Kay

Personal details
- Born: 1916 Flat, Territory of Alaska
- Died: 1999 (aged 82–83)
- Party: Republican
- Spouse: Kate Stanković

George J. Miscovich (1916–1999) was an American-Croat politician and speaker of the Alaska territorial House of Representatives.

== Biography ==
He was born in Flat, Territory of Alaska in family of scientist Peter Miscovich and Stane Bagoy, two Croatian emigrants. He got his name by his grandfather George (cro. Đuro). He attended high school in Fairbanks and he served with the US Army Air Forces in World War II. Afterward George was a miner near Flat and Poorman. George was elected to the Alaska territorial House of Representatives as a Republican in 1948. From 1953. to 1955, he was speaker of the House.

Political offices
Preceded by William A. Egan	Speaker of the Alaska House of Representatives; 1953 — 1955	Succeeded by Wendell P. Kay
