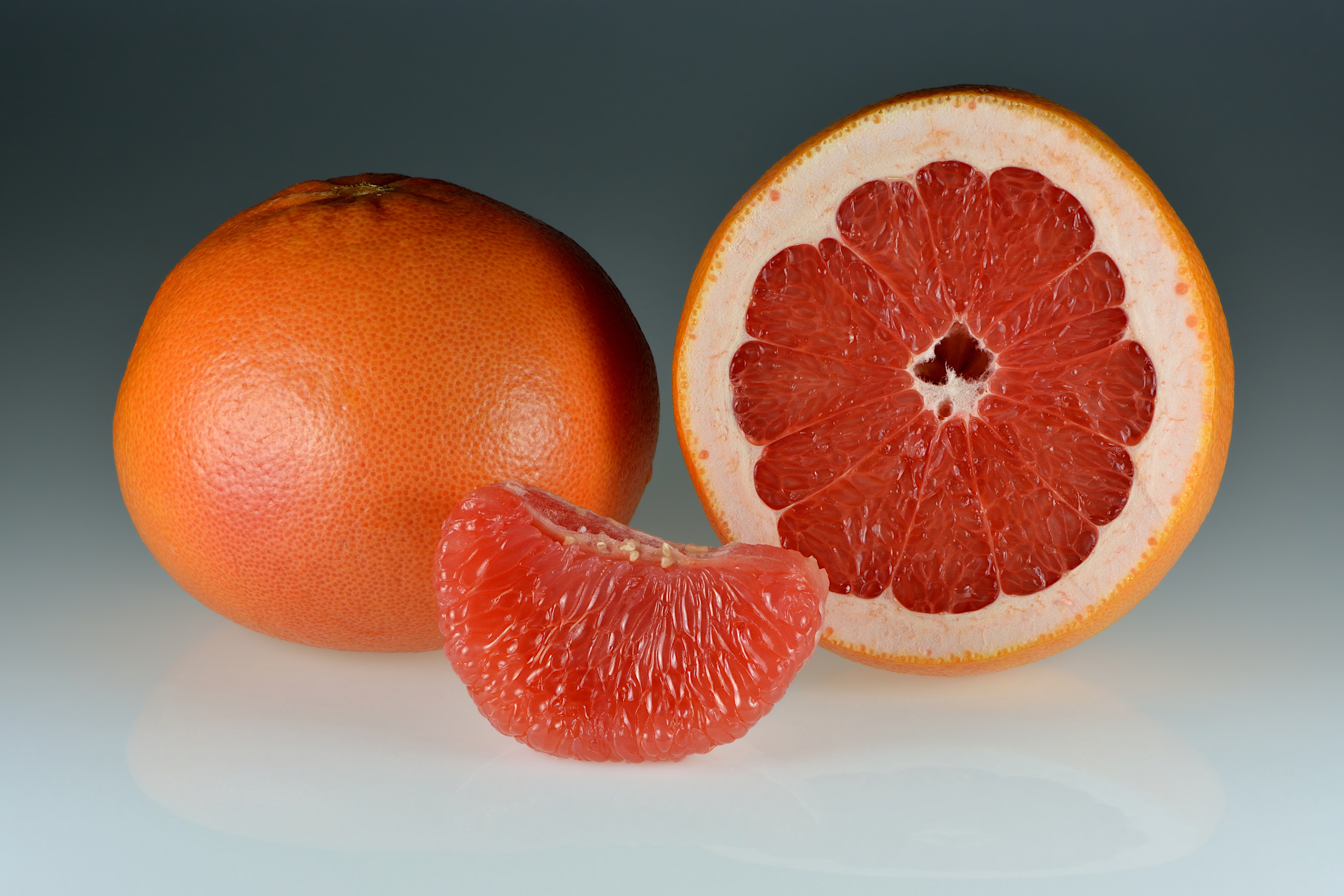

Scientific classification
- Kingdom: Plantae
- Clade: Tracheophytes
- Clade: Angiosperms
- Clade: Eudicots
- Clade: Rosids
- Order: Sapindales
- Family: Rutaceae
- Genus: Citrus
- Species: C. × paradisi

Binomial name
- Citrus × paradisi Macfad.

= Grapefruit =

Citrus fruit

The grapefruit (Citrus × paradisi) is a subtropical citrus tree known for its relatively large, sour to semi-sweet, somewhat bitter fruit. The flesh of the fruit is segmented and varies in color from pale yellow to dark red.

Grapefruits originated in Barbados in the 18th century. They are a citrus hybrid that was created through an accidental cross between the sweet orange (C. × sinensis) and the pomelo (C. maxima), both of which were introduced to the Caribbean from Asia in the 17th century. It has also been called the 'forbidden fruit'. In the past it was called the pomelo, but that term is now mostly used as the common name for Citrus maxima.

Grapefruit–drug interactions are common, as the juice contains furanocoumarins that interfere with the metabolism of many drugs. This can prolong and intensify the effects of those drugs, leading to multiple side-effects such as abnormal heart rhythms, bleeding inside the stomach, low blood pressure, difficulty breathing, and dizziness.

== Description ==
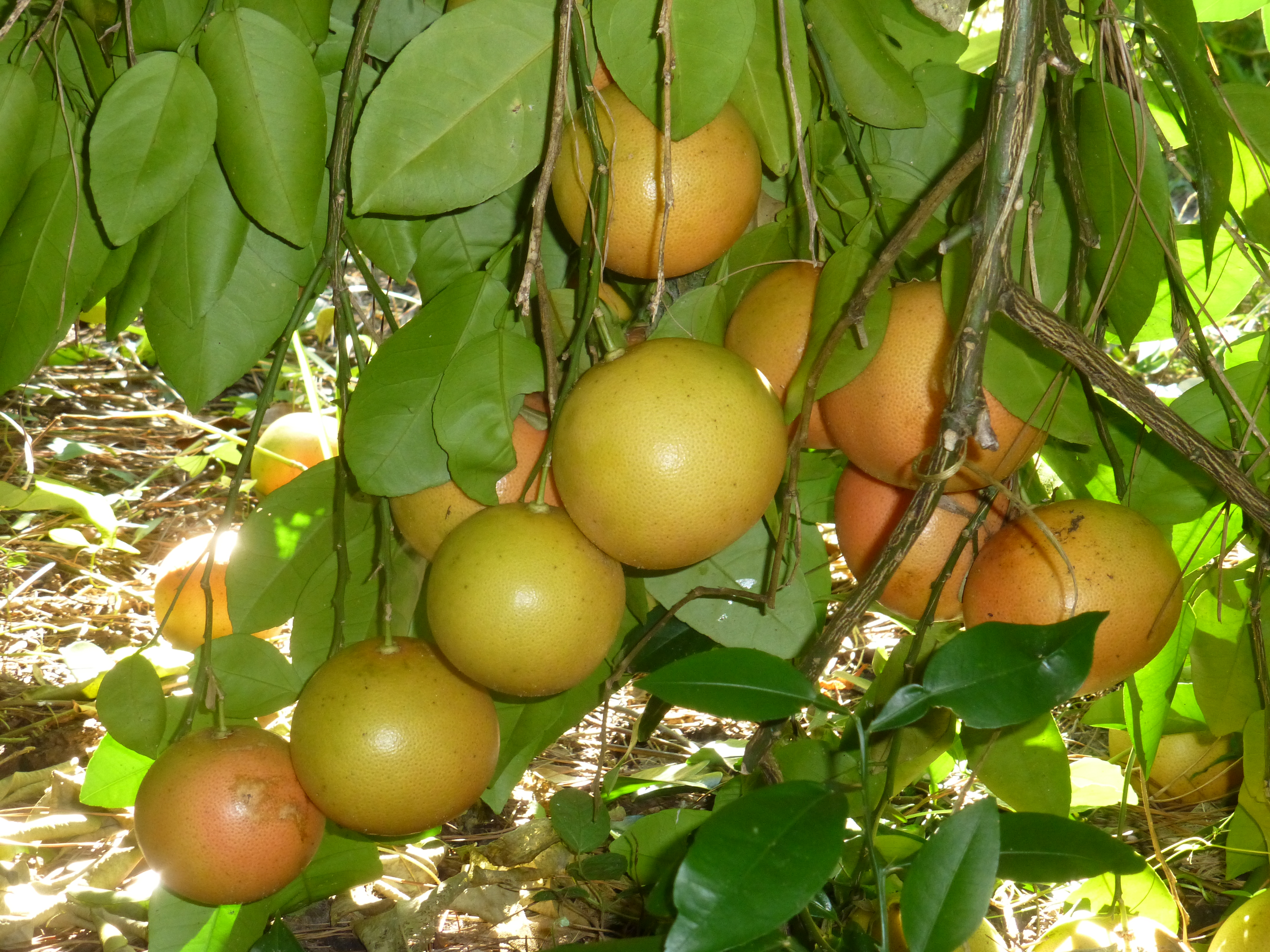
Grapefruit growing in the grape-like clusters from which their name may derive

The evergreen grapefruit trees usually grow to around 4.5–6 m (15–20 ft) tall, although they may reach 13.7 m (45 ft). The leaves are up to 15 cm (6 in) long, thin, glossy, and dark green. They produce 5 cm (2 in) white flowers with four or five petals. The fruit is yellow-orange skinned and generally an oblate spheroid in shape; it ranges in diameter from 10 to 15 cm (4 to 6 in). Its flesh is segmented and acidic, varying in color depending on the cultivars, which include white, pink, and red pulps of varying sweetness (generally, the redder varieties are the sweetest).

=== Varieties ===
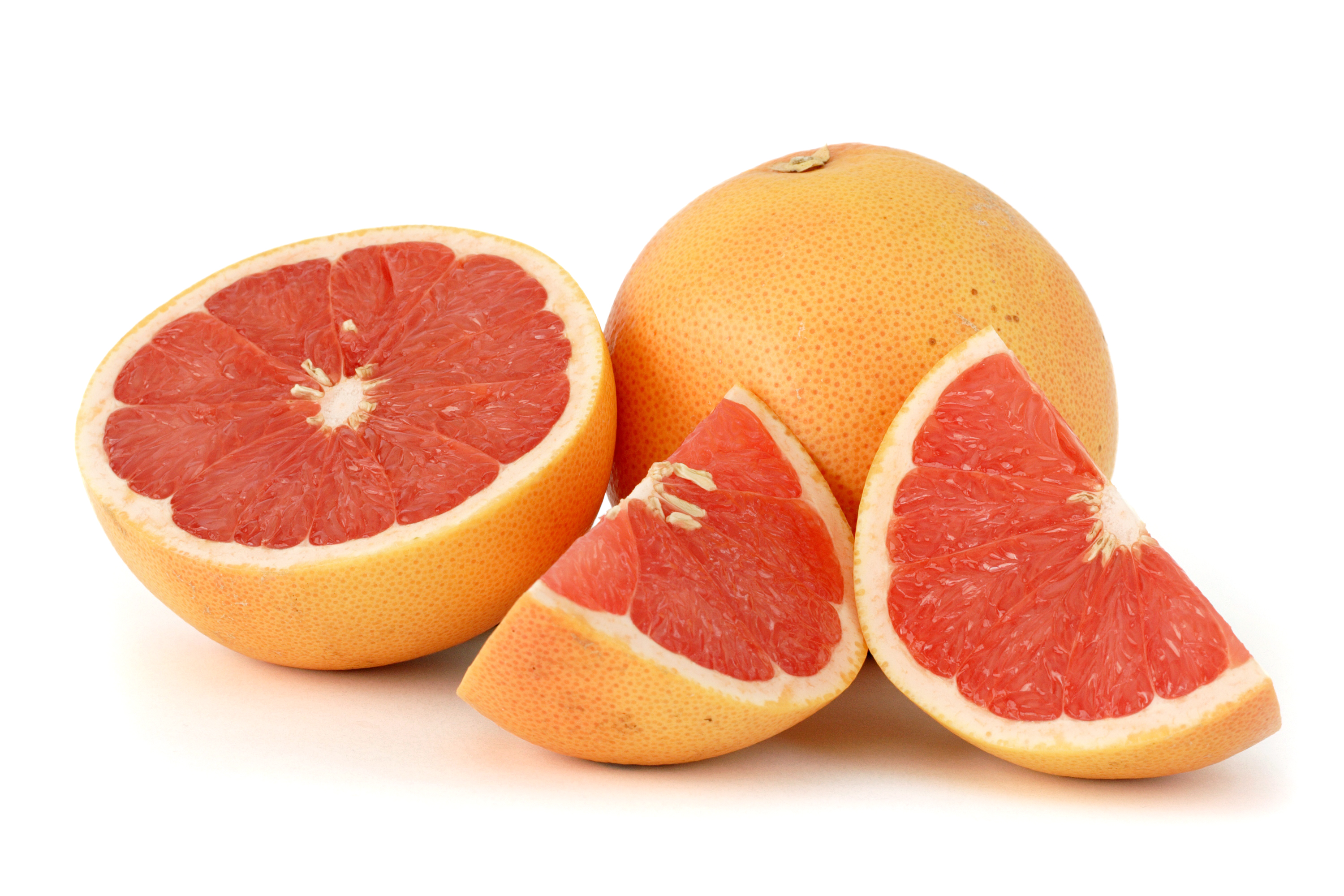
"Red" grapefruit

White grapefruit varieties include Camulos, Cecily, Duncan, Frost Marsh, Genetic Dwarf Marsh, Hall, Jochimsen, Marsh seedy, Nicholson navel, Perlis, Reed Marsh, Tetraploid, Warren Marsh, and Whitney Marsh.

Red or pink grapefruit varieties include Flame, Foster Pink, Henderson Ruby, Hudson Foster, Marsh Pink, Ray Ruby, Redblush, Rio Red, Shambar, and Star Ruby.

The 1929 'Ruby Red' (or 'Redblush') patent was associated with real commercial success, which came after the discovery of a red grapefruit growing on a pink variety. The Texas Legislature designated this variety the official "State Fruit of Texas" in 1993.

Using radiation to trigger mutations, new varieties were developed to retain the red tones that typically faded to pink. The 'Rio Red' variety is a 1984 registered Texas grapefruit with registered trademarks Rio Star and Ruby-Sweet, also sometimes promoted as Reddest and Texas Choice. The 'Rio Red' is a mutation-bred variety that was developed by treatment of bud sticks with thermal neutrons. Its improved attributes of mutant variety are fruit and juice color, deeper red, and wide adaptation.

The 'Star Ruby' is the darkest of the red varieties. Developed from an irradiated 'Hudson' grapefruit ('Hudson' being a limb sport of 'Foster', itself a limb sport of the 'Walters'), it has found limited commercial success because it is more difficult to grow than other varieties.

== As food ==
=== Nutrition ===
Grapefruit, raw, white, all areas
Nutritional value per 100 g (3.5 oz)
- Energy: 138 kJ (33 kcal)
- Carbohydrates: 8.41 g
- Sugars: 7.31 g
- Dietary fiber: 1.1 g
- Fat: 0.10 g
- Protein: 0.8 g
Vitamins and minerals
Vitamins	Quantity %DV^{†}
Thiamine (B1)	3% 0.037 mg
Riboflavin (B2)	2% 0.020 mg
Niacin (B3)	2% 0.269 mg
Pantothenic acid (B5)	6% 0.283 mg
Vitamin B6	3% 0.043 mg
Folate (B9)	3% 10 μg
Choline	1% 7.7 mg
Vitamin C	37% 33.3 mg
Vitamin E	1% 0.13 mg
Minerals	Quantity %DV^{†}
Calcium	1% 12 mg
Iron	0% 0.06 mg
Magnesium	2% 9 mg
Manganese	1% 0.013 mg
Phosphorus	1% 8 mg
Potassium	5% 148 mg
Zinc	1% 0.07 mg
- Other constituents: Quantity
- Water: 90.48 g
- Link to USDA Database entry
- ^{†}Percentages estimated using US recommendations for adults, except for potassium, which is estimated based on expert recommendation from the National Academies.

Raw white grapefruit may vary in content but is approximately 90% water, 8% carbohydrates and 1% protein, with negligible fat (table). In a reference amount of 100 grams (3 1/2 ounces), raw grapefruit provides 138 kilojoules (33 kilocalories) of food energy and is a rich source of vitamin C (37% of the DV), with no other micronutrients in significant amounts (table).

=== Culinary ===
Like other citrus fruits, grapefruits are sour because of their citric acid content; grapefruit juice contains about half the citric acid content of lemon juice, and nearly 50% more than orange juice. In Costa Rica, especially in Atenas, grapefruit are often cooked with sugar to balance their sourness, rendering them as sweets; or they are stuffed with dulce de leche as a dessert. In Haiti, grapefruit is used primarily for its juice (French: jus de Chadèque), but also is used to make jam (French: confiture de Chadèque). The peel of the grapefruit can also be candied. In Cuba, during the Special Period in the 1990s, grapefruit pith was breaded and fried to make a famine food called bistec de toronja.

Grapefruit varieties are differentiated by the colour of the fruit's flesh. Common varieties are yellow and pink. Some are highly acidic, others somewhat sour to sweet and tart, resulting from their content of sugars (mainly sucrose), organic acids (mainly citric acid), and monoterpenes and sesquiterpenes providing aromas. Grapefruit mercaptan, a sulphur-containing terpene, is one of the aroma compounds influencing the taste and odour of grapefruit, compared with other citrus fruits.

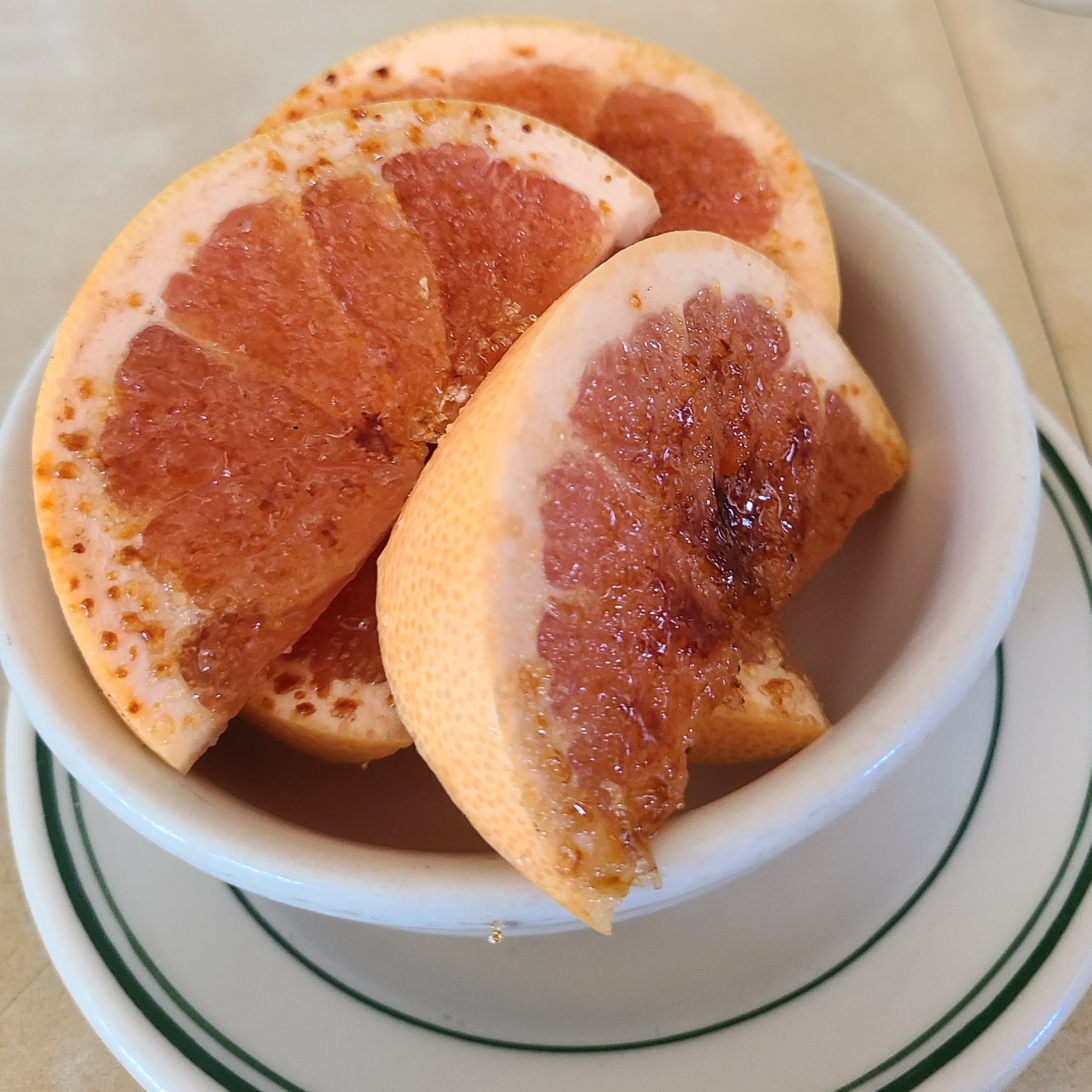
Caramelized grapefruit

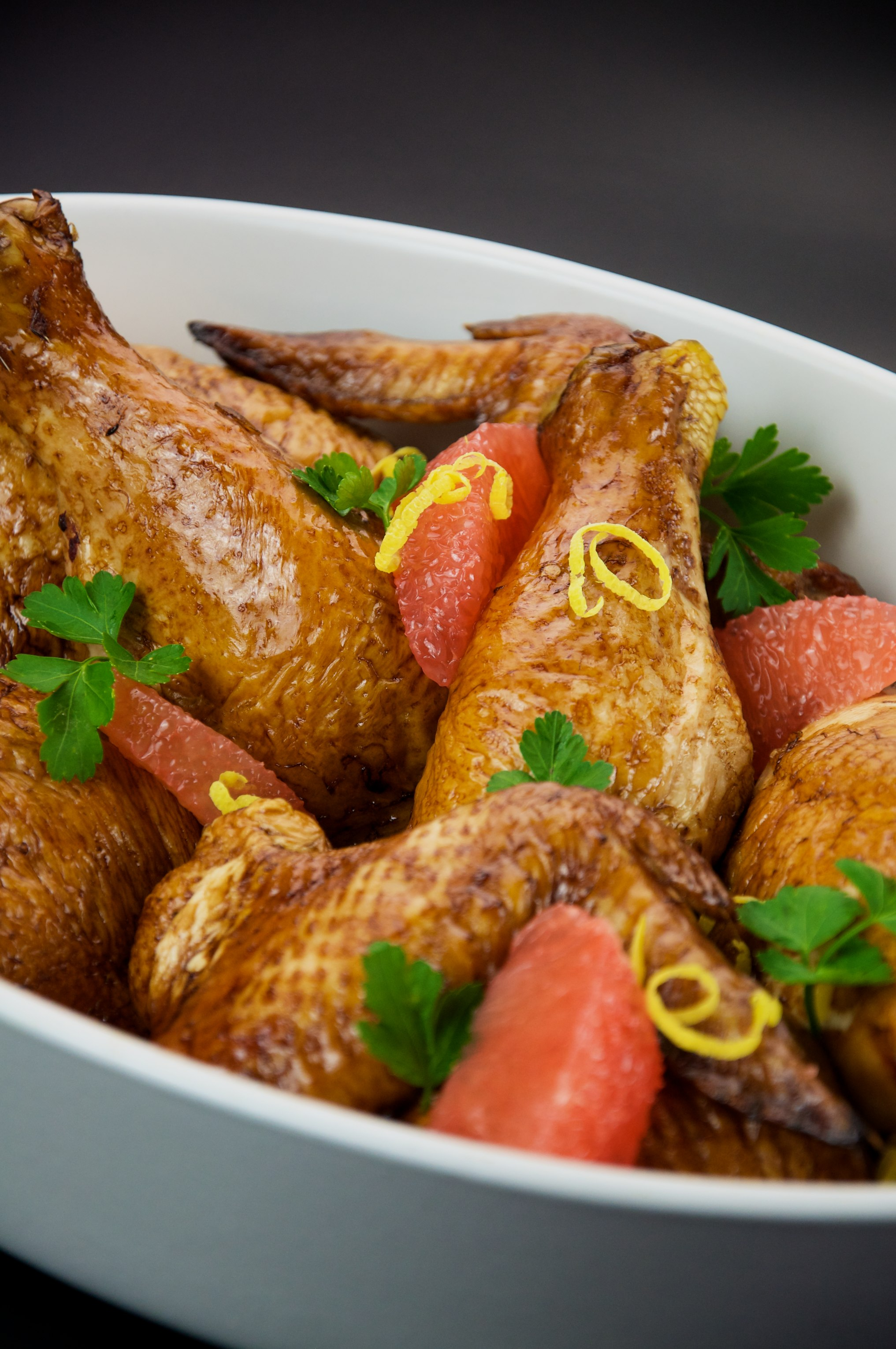
Roasted grapefruit chicken

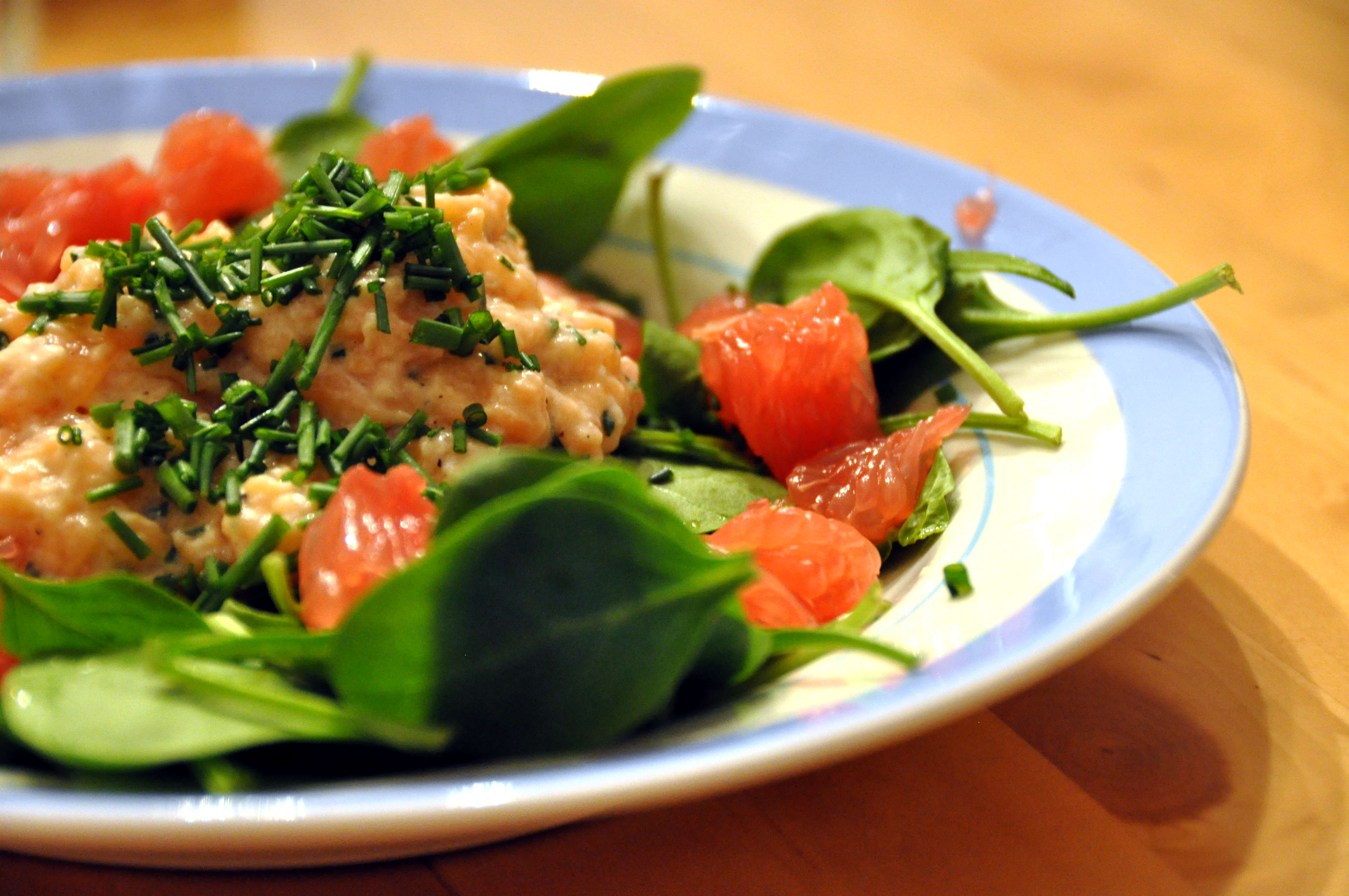
Salmon tartar with spinach and red grapefruit

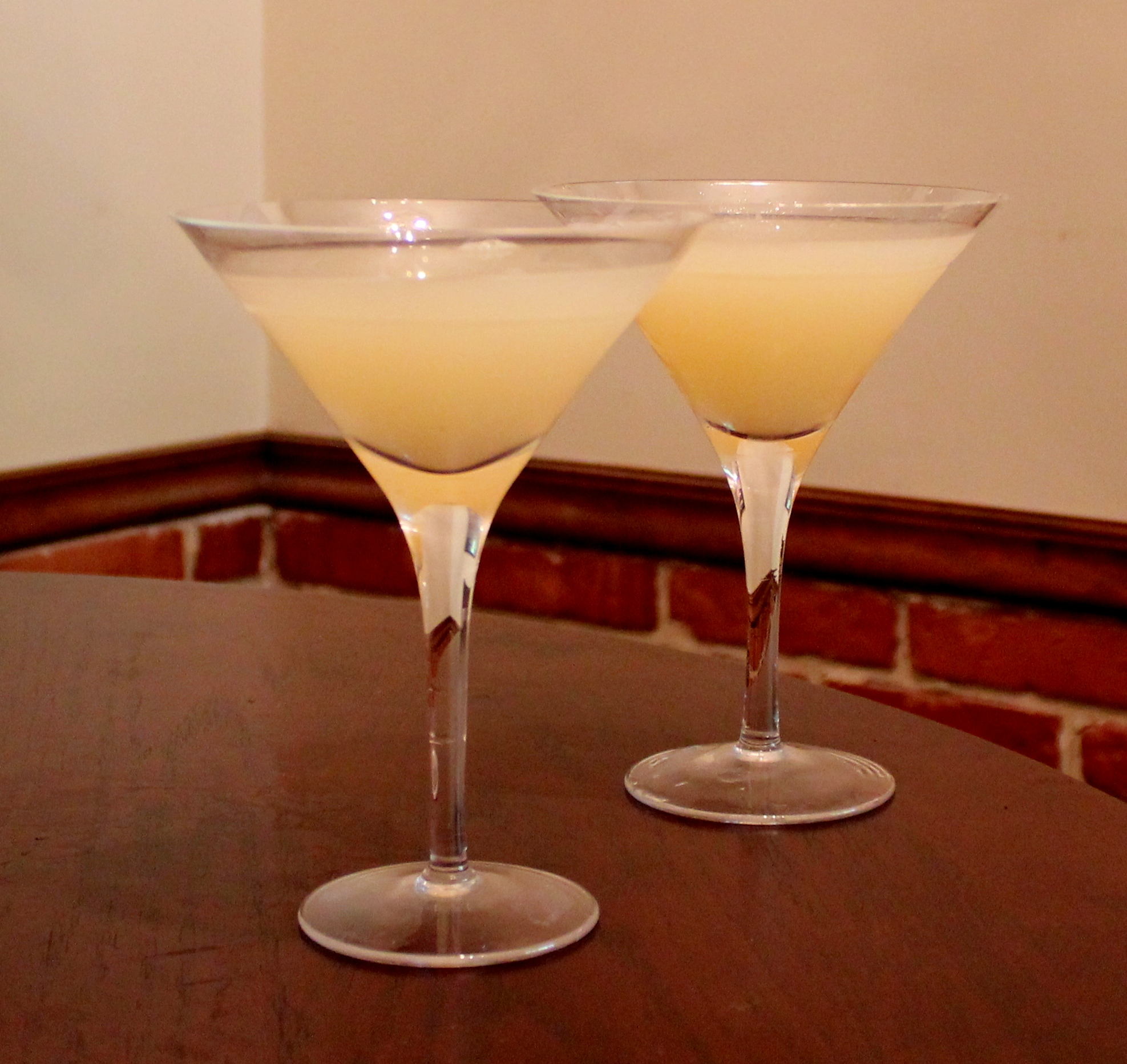
Greyhound cocktail, with gin and juice

== Drug interactions ==
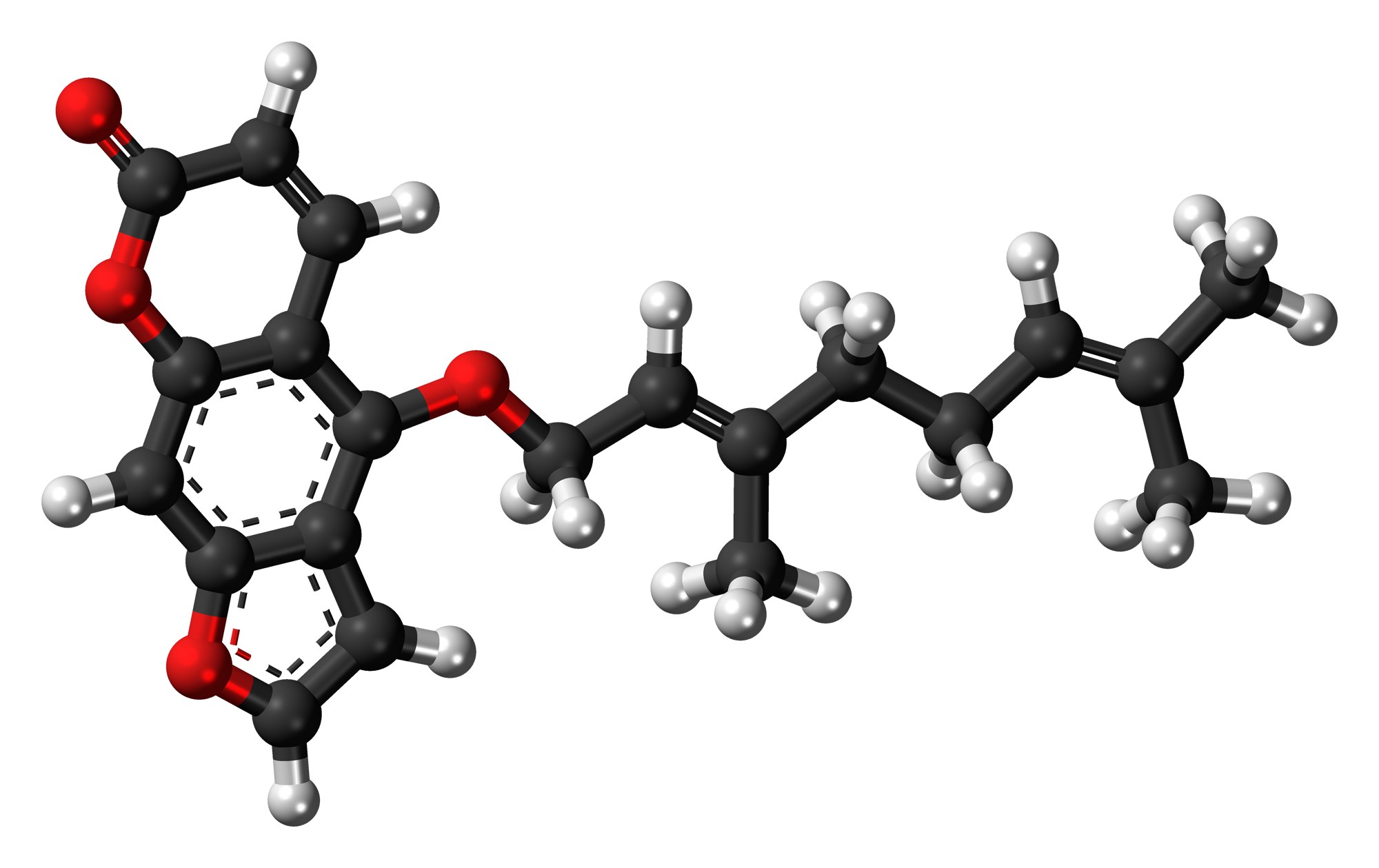
Grapefruit juice contains bergamottin, one of the furanocoumarins which inhibit the metabolism of many drugs, causing multiple side-effects.

Grapefruit and grapefruit juice interact with many drugs, resulting in numerous adverse effects including bone marrow suppression, nephrotoxicity, abnormal heart rhythm, rhabdomyolysis, hypotension, gastrointestinal bleeding, dizziness, and respiratory depression, according to the drug involved.

One interaction occurs from grapefruit furanocoumarins, such as bergamottin and 6',7'-dihydroxybergamottin, which occur in both flesh and peel. Furanocoumarins inhibit the CYP3A4 enzyme (among others from the cytochrome P450 enzyme family responsible for metabolizing 90% of drugs). The action of the CYP3A4 enzyme itself is to metabolize many medications. If a drug's breakdown for removal is lessened, then the level of that drug in the blood may become and remain high, leading to adverse effects. On the other hand, some drugs must be metabolized to become active, and inhibiting CYP3A4 may lead to reduced drug effects.

Another effect is that grapefruit compounds may inhibit the absorption of drugs in the intestine. If a drug is not absorbed, then not enough of it is in the blood to have a therapeutic effect. Each affected drug has either a specific increase of effect or decrease.

One whole grapefruit or a glass of 200 mL (7 US fl oz) of grapefruit juice is enough to cause significant increases in drug exposure and harm. This especially affects drugs with low bioavailability due to high first pass metabolism. Typically, drugs that are incompatible with grapefruit are marked as such on the container or package insert.

== Production ==
Grapefruit production 2023, millions of tonnes
China	5.20
Vietnam	1.20
Mexico	0.49
South Africa	0.41
United States	0.30
World	9.93
Source: FAOSTAT of the United Nations

In 2023, world production of grapefruits (combined with pomelos) was 9.93 million tonnes, led by China with 52% of the total and Vietnam as a secondary producer (table).

Production of grapefruit

Grapefruit yield

=== Pests and diseases ===
Grapefruits are hosts for fruit flies (family Tephritidae) such as A. suspensa, which lay their eggs in overripe or spoiled grapefruits, sometimes causing serious damage in plantations in the Americas. In sub-Saharan Africa, the Citrus swallowtail, Papilio demodocus, is a minor pest of Citrus plantations. Grapefruits are subject to several diseases of Citrus trees, including citrus tristeza virus, citrus canker (caused by a bacterium, Xanthomonas), and the vector-transmitted citrus greening disease, where the vector is a psyllid bug, and the pathogen is a bacterium, Liberibacter.

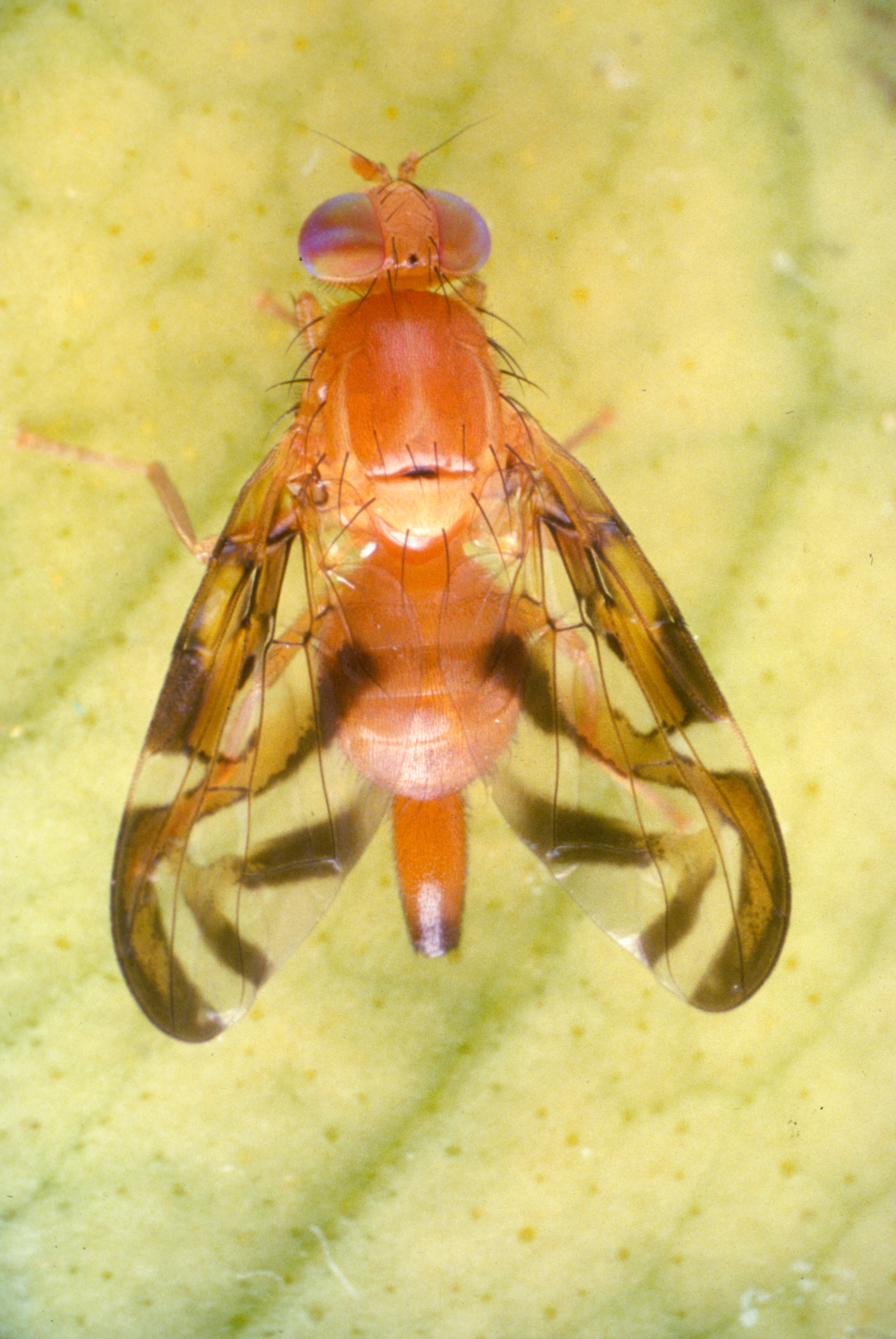
The fruit fly Anastrepha suspensa, a serious pest in the New World

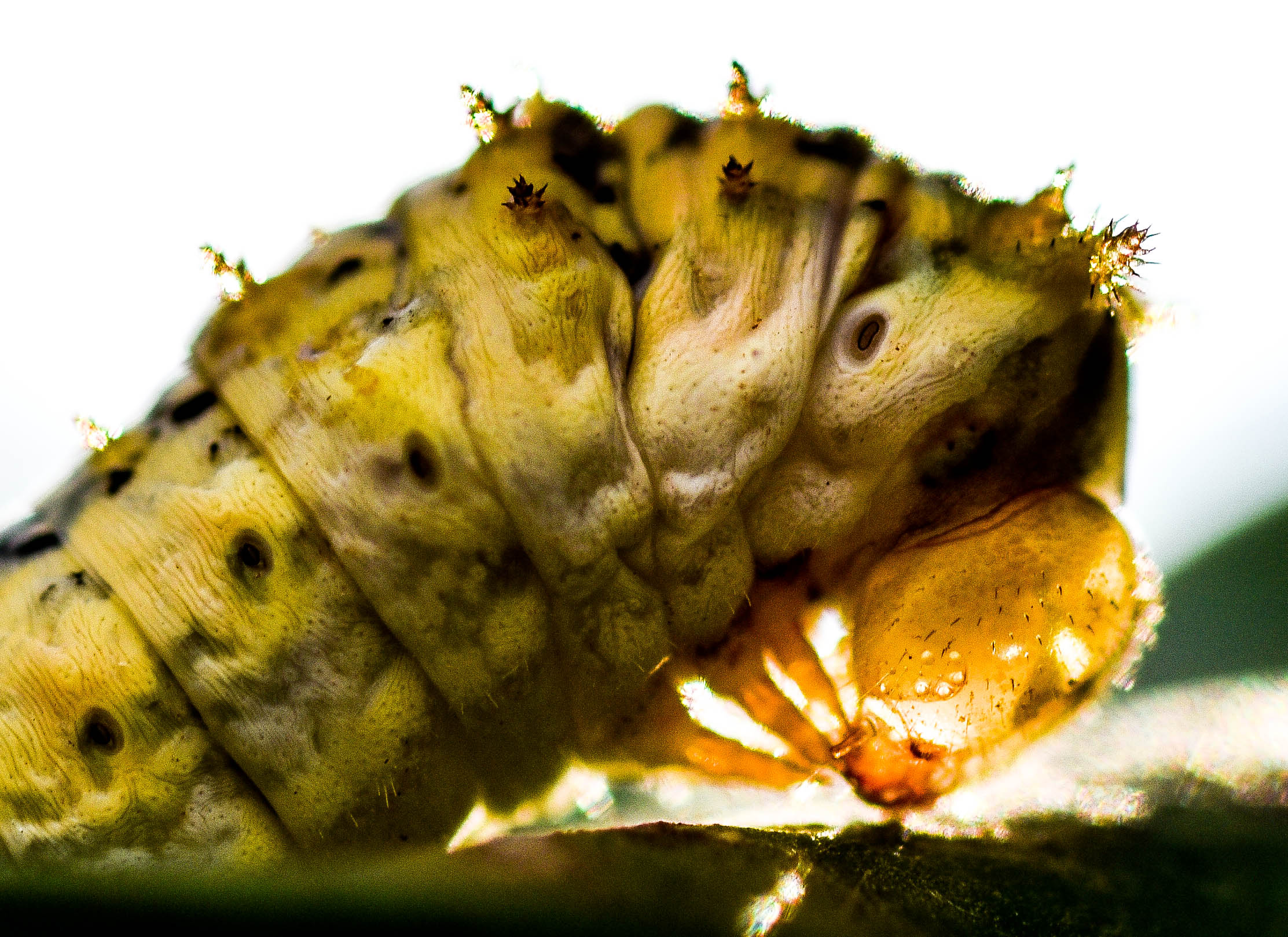
Citrus swallowtail, Papilio demodocus caterpillar, Africa

== History ==
The grapefruit, like many cultivated Citrus species, is a hybrid, in its case of the sweet orange and pomelo.

Grapefruit originated as a natural hybrid. One ancestor of the grapefruit was the Jamaican sweet orange (Citrus sinensis), itself an ancient hybrid of Asian origin; the other was the Indonesian pomelo (C. maxima). The pomelo was the female ancestor; the sweet orange, itself a hybrid, was the male. Both C. sinensis and C. maxima were present in the West Indies by 1692. One story of the fruit's origin is that a 17th-century trader named 'Captain Shaddock' brought pomelo seeds to Jamaica and bred the first fruit, which were then called shaddocks. The grapefruit then probably originated as a naturally occurring hybrid between the two plants some time after they had been introduced there.

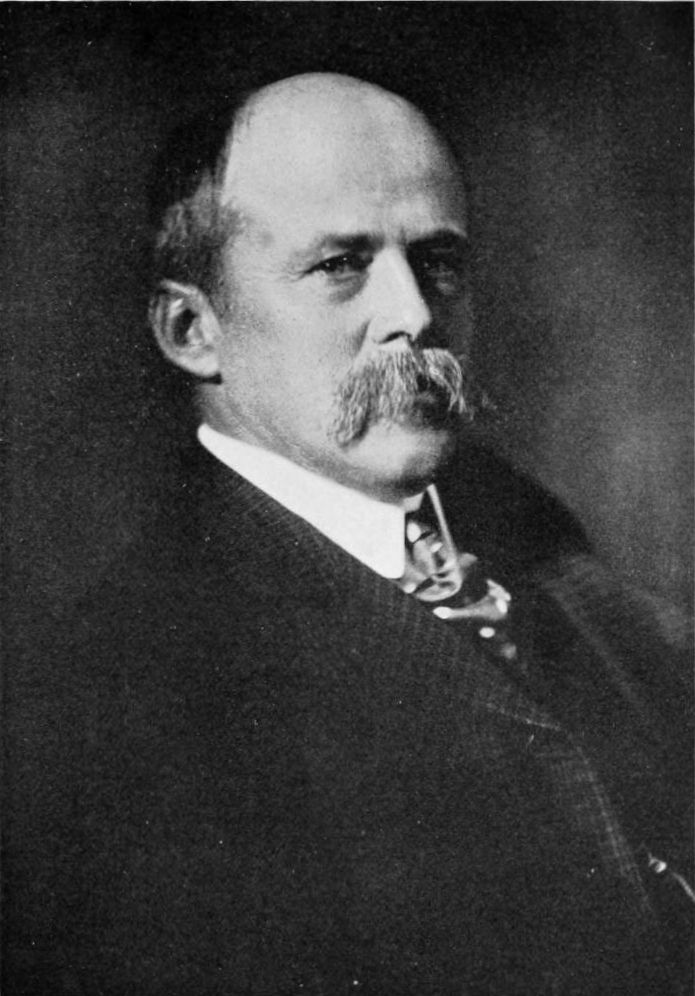
Kimball Chase Atwood founded the Atwood Grapefruit Company in the late 19th century. It became the largest grapefruit grove in the world.

A hybrid fruit, called forbidden fruit, was first documented in 1750 (along with 14 other citrus fruits including the guiney orange) by the Welsh clergyman Griffith Hughes, in his The Natural History of Barbados. However, Hughes's forbidden fruit may have been a plant distinct from grapefruit although still closely related to it.

In 1814, the British naturalist and plantation owner John Lunan published the term grapefruit to describe a similar Jamaican citrus plant. Lunan reported that the name was due to its similarity in taste to the grape (Vitis vinifera). An alternative explanation is that this name may allude to clusters of the fruit on the tree, which often appear similar to bunches of grapes.

In 1830, the Jamaican version of the plant was given the botanical name Citrus paradisi by the Scottish physician and botanist James Macfadyen. Macfadyen identified two varieties – one called forbidden fruit, the other Barbadoes Grape Fruit. Macfadyen distinguished between the two plants by fruit shape with the Barbados grapefruit being piriform (pear shaped) while the forbidden fruit was "maliformis" (apple shaped). Macfadyen's and Hughes's descriptions differ, so it is not clear that the two reports are describing the same plant. It has been suggested that Hughes's golden orange may actually have been a grapefruit, while his forbidden fruit was a different variety that may since have been lost. A citrus called forbidden fruit or shaddette has been discovered in Saint Lucia; it may be the plant described by Hughes and Macfadyen.

The name grape-fruit was used during the 19th century to refer to pomelos. It was brought to Florida by the French businessman Count Odet Philippe in 1823, in what is now known as Safety Harbor. Further crosses have produced the tangelo (1905), the Minneola tangelo (1931), and the oroblanco (1958). Its true origins were not determined until the 1940s, at which point its official name was altered to Citrus × paradisi, the × identifying it as a hybrid. An early pioneer in the American citrus industry was Kimball C. Atwood, a wealthy entrepreneur who founded the Atwood Grapefruit Company in the late 19th century. The Atwood Grove became the largest grapefruit grove in the world, with a yearly output of 80,000 boxes of fruit. There, pink grapefruit was discovered in 1906.

== See also ==
- Grapefruit knife – Knife designed for cutting grapefruit
- Grapefruit spoon – Kind of spoon intended for use with citrus fruit
- Naringenin – Main polyphenol in grapefruit
- New Zealand grapefruit – Citrus fruit
