= Wendell P. Kay =

American lawyer and politician (1913–1986)

Wendell Kay
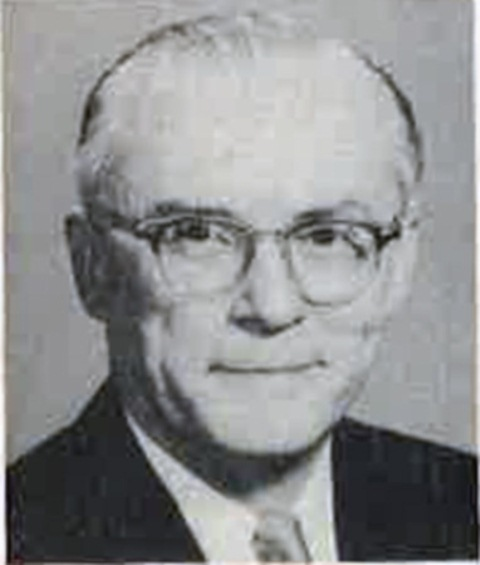

Personal details
- Born: Wendell Palmer Kay; August 17, 1913 Watseka, Illinois, U.S.
- Died: June 29, 1986 (aged 72) Anchorage, Alaska, U.S.
- Party: Democratic
- Education: DePauw University (BA); Northwestern University (JD)

Wendell Palmer Kay Jr. (August 17, 1913 – June 29, 1986) was an American lawyer and Democratic politician active in the territory and state of Alaska.

== Biography ==
Born in Illinois, Wendell Palmer Kay, a lawyer, was a member of the Alaska Territorial House of Representatives from 1951 to 1956, representing 3rd district, and the Speaker of this body during his last term (1955-1956).

In addition, during the 1956 Democratic National Convention he served as an alternate delegate from Alaska Territory and a full delegate from the State of Alaska to the successive 1960 Convention.

After U.S. Senator Bob Bartlett, a fellow Democrat, died in office in 1968, then-Republican Governor Walter Joseph Hickel appointed Ted Stevens, former U.S. Attorney and a high-level official in the United States Department of Interior during President Dwight D. Eisenhower's administration, to fill the vacancy.

Because of this, in 1970 Alaska set a special election for remainder of Bartlett's term. Kay ran as a Democratic nominee against incumbent Stevens and was defeated by 59.6% won by Stevens versus 40.4% won by him. Stevens served in the Senate until 2008 and was the longest serving Republican Senator and President pro tempore emeritus of the Senate (he was president pro tem from 2003 to 2007) at the time of his defeat.

Wendell Kay practiced law for many years in Anchorage, Alaska, and he was widely considered within the legal community there as the foremost criminal defense lawyer of his day. Known as the "Silver Fox," Mr. Kay had the rare ability to succeed at a technique known as exploratory cross-examination, where the questioner does not know the answer that the witness will give. In one trial for assault, Mr. Kay was able to use this method to establish a devastating fact of which neither side had been previously aware: that the complaining witness was on anti-psychotic medication for mental illness. Mr. Kay was then able to persuade the judge to direct the witness to show the jury the bottle of pills in question.

== See also ==
- United States Senate elections, 1970

Political offices
Preceded by George Miscovich	Speaker of the Alaska House of Representatives; 1955–1957	Succeeded by Dick Greuel
Party political offices
Preceded by Bob Bartlett	Democratic nominee for U.S. Senator from Alaska (Class 2); 1970	Succeeded by Gene Guess
