= 1970 United States Senate special election in Alaska =

- November 3, 1970
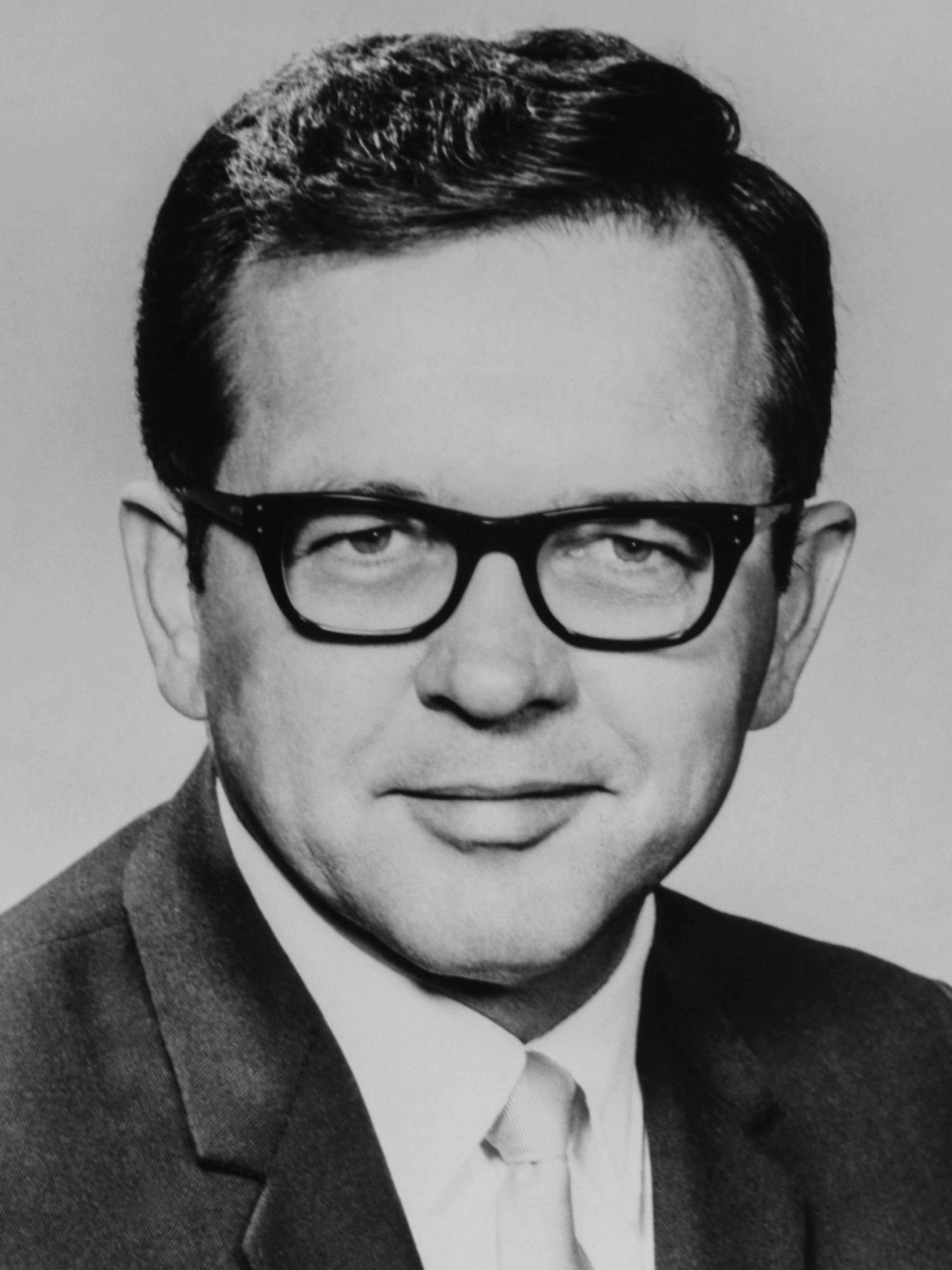

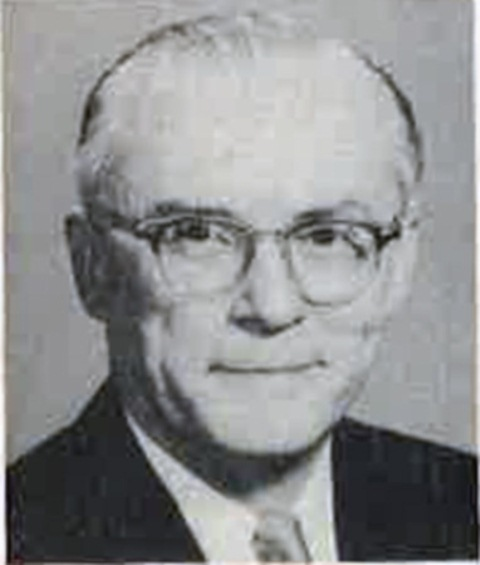
Candidate	Ted Stevens	Wendell P. Kay
Party	Republican	Democratic
Popular vote	47,908	32,456
Percentage	59.61%	40.39%
- Stevens: 50–60% 60–70% 70–80% Kay: 50–60% 60–70%
U.S. senator before election
Ted Stevens
Republican
Elected U.S. senator
Ted Stevens
Republican

The 1970 United States Senate special election in Alaska was held on November 3, 1970, to fill a seat in the United States Senate following the December 1968 death of Democrat Bob Bartlett, who had been Alaska's senior Senator since statehood in 1959. Republican Ted Stevens was appointed to the seat temporarily on December 24, 1968, to serve until the election could be held.

Stevens faced-off against Democrat Wendell P. Kay for the right to serve the remainder of Bartlett's term, which expired on January 3, 1973. Stevens won the special election, receiving 59.6% of the vote versus 40.4% won by Kay. This election marked the first time in Alaska's history that it elected a Republican to the U.S. Senate, the last remaining U.S. state to do so. Stevens would go on to win re-election to six full terms, winning easily, until his defeat in 2008.

== Campaign ==
Stevens spent most of the campaign in Washington D.C., Kay angrily trying to convince Stevens to debate, with Stevens portraying himself as a busy legislator who was taking care of Alaska's interests in the Capitol while Kay flung accusations. Stevens was noted for his solid organization, with many suborganizations such as 'Women for Stevens', and hosting frequent strategy meetings with supporters in nearly every community in the state. To encourage support from small business owners, Stevens asked the Small Business Administration to hold development conferences throughout the state.

Stevens had lost the 1962 Senate race and 1968 Republican Senate primary, there were concerns about Stevens' electability in the campaign. Kay attacked Stevens on his support of the Nixon administration, calling on him to publicly defend his record, in an attempt to overcome Stevens' large lead in support. Kay attacked Stevens & Nixon on failing to handle unemployment, the high cost of living, inflation, native land claims, the pipeline permit, continued war and pollution control. Kay released detailed "position papers" on each of these issues, in one of which he demanded a "substantial reordering of national priorities", placing local community issues ahead of financing the Vietnam War or the construction of supersonic transport.

Kay's loss was quite stark, especially considering Bill Egan's reclaiming of the governor's office and Nick Begich's election in the 1970 U.S. House race, as well as similar Democratic gains in local offices. Many Democrats quietly supported Stevens over concerns that Kay was too liberal, and Stevens had cultivated constituent issues quite skillfully while in office. Most importantly, Kay's primary challenge to Governor Egan was seen as a major factor in his re-election loss for a third term in 1966 to Republican Walter Hickel.

== Primary election ==
=== Candidates ===
==== Republican ====
- Fritz Singer
- Ted Stevens, incumbent U.S. Senator since 1968, former Solicitor of the Interior & U.S. Attorney

==== Democratic ====
- Joe Josephson, state senator
- Wendell P. Kay, Speaker of the Alaska House of Representatives

=== Results ===
Open primary results
Party	Candidate	Votes	%
Republican	Ted Stevens (incumbent)	39,062	55.91
Democratic	Wendell P. Kay	16,729	23.94
Democratic	Joe Josephson	12,730	18.22
Republican	Fritz Singer	1,349	1.93
Total votes		69,870	100.00

== General election ==
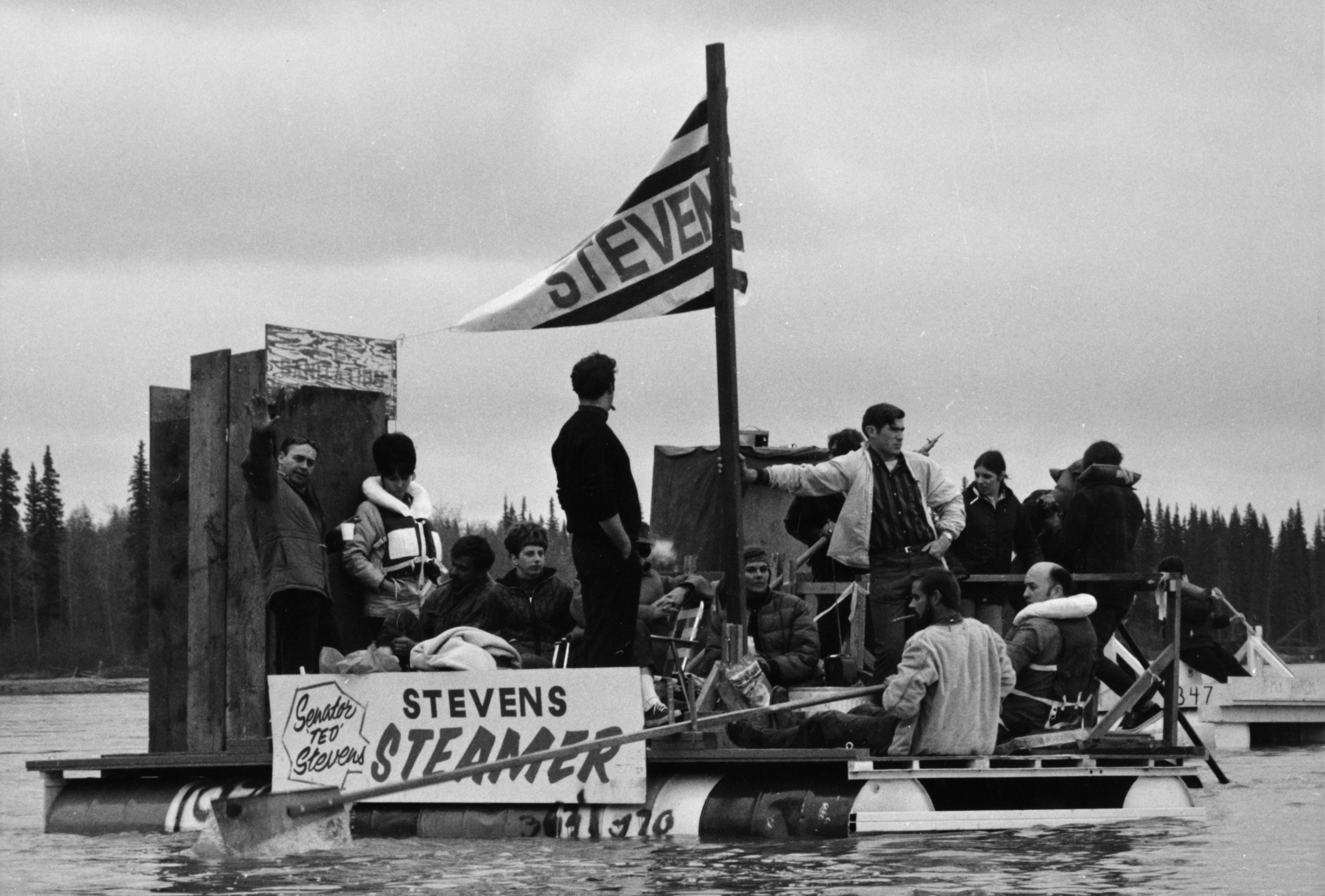
The Stevens Steamer, a raft commissioned by supporters of the Stevens campaign, which participated in the 1970 Great Tanana River Raft race.

=== Results overview ===
Special election results
Party	Candidate	Votes	%	±%
Republican	Ted Stevens (incumbent)	47,908	59.61%	+35.15
Democratic	Wendell P. Kay	32,456	40.39%	–35.15
Total votes		80,364	100.00%	
Republican hold				

=== Results by district ===
District results
District	Ted Stevens (incumbent) Republican		Wendell P. Kay Democratic		Total votes
District	#	%	#	%	Total votes
District 1	2,299	51.6%	2,160	48.4%	4,459
District 2	995	60.2%	659	39.8%	1,654
District 3	1,104	47.9%	1,203	52.1%	2,307
District 4	3,053	52.3%	2,790	47.7%	5,843
District 5	686	52.6%	617	47.4%	1,303
District 6	1,016	58.7%	714	41.3%	1,730
District 7	1,780	73.1%	656	26.9%	2,436
District 8	20,502	64.9%	11,104	35.1%	31,606
District 9	592	62.6%	354	37.4%	946
District 10	2,535	61.2%	1,604	38.8%	4,139
District 11	1,028	57.0%	777	43.0%	1,805
District 12	389	54.9%	319	45.1%	708
District 13	660	57.3%	492	42.7%	1,152
District 14	828	45.4%	994	54.6%	1,822
District 15	1,068	57.8%	781	42.2%	1,849
District 16	7,432	58.9%	5,181	41.1%	12,613
District 17	701	44.6%	871	55.4%	1,572
District 18	835	49.8%	841	50.2%	1,676
District 19	405	54.4%	339	45.6%	744
Totals	47,908	59.6%	32,456	40.4%	80,364

== See also ==
- 1970 United States Senate elections
- List of special elections to the United States Senate
