= Philippe Park =

Park in Florida, United States

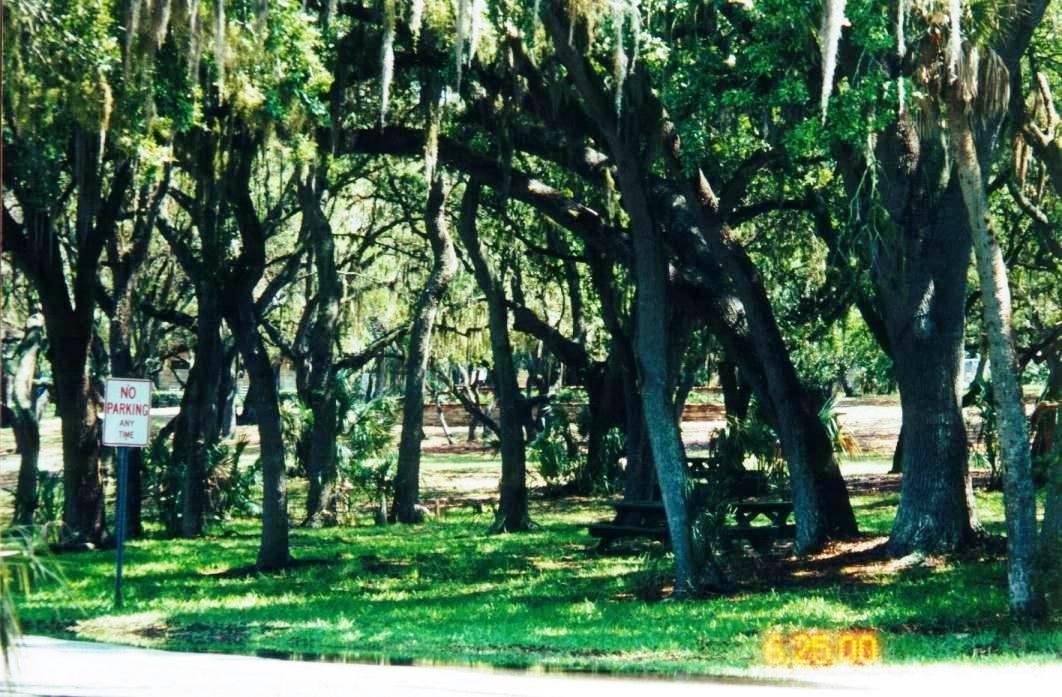
- Interactive map of Philippe Park
- Location: Safety Harbor, Florida
- Coordinates: 28°0′19″N 82°41′34″W
- Area: 122 acres (49 ha)
- Created: 1948
- Operator: Pinellas County Parks & Recreation

Philippe Park is a Pinellas County park located in Safety Harbor, Florida. It is the oldest park in the county. The park is named after Odet Philippe, who is credited with introducing grapefruit to Florida. It is situated on 122 acres (0.49 km^{2}) that was once part of Philippe's plantation. Philippe was the county's first non-native settler, arriving in 1842. Philippe is buried in the park but the exact location is undetermined. Half a century later the plantation was still growing citrus, as a nursery for the area extending north to Tarpon Springs. Then, here in 1907 citrus leprosis was first discovered by Fawcett. CL went on to almost eliminate citrus growing in Florida by 1925.

A Tocobaga Indian mound that is situated in the park is a National Historic Landmark known as the Safety Harbor Site.

The temple mound is one of the last remnants of the Tocobaga on the Pinellas Peninsula. Records indicate that Pedro Menéndez de Avilés, the founder of St. Augustine, Florida, visited the site in 1566 to help broker a truce between the Tocobaga and the Calusa to the south. During the visit Pedro Menéndez founded a Spanish outpost nearby, but by 1567 it was reported to have been wiped out by the Tocobaga. Eventually the temple mound was deserted. The Tocobaga succumbed to European diseases, and many were forced into slavery working in the Caribbean.

== Gallery ==
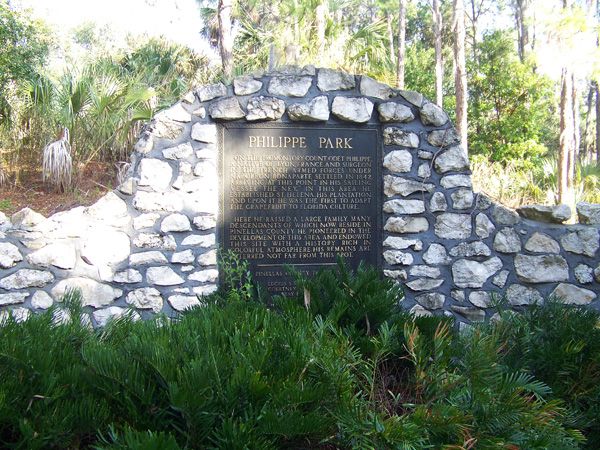

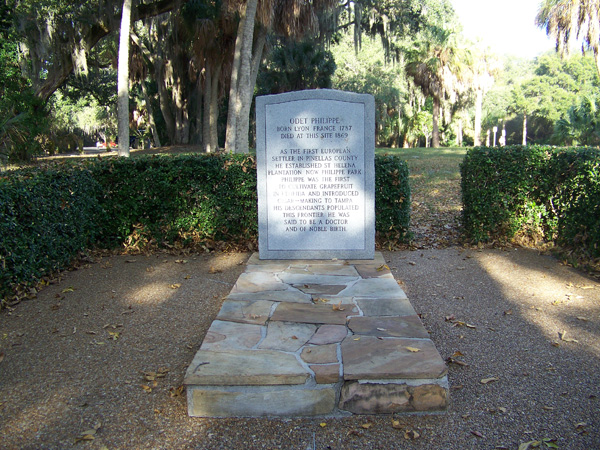

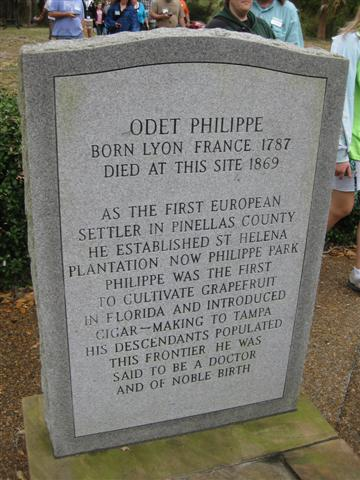

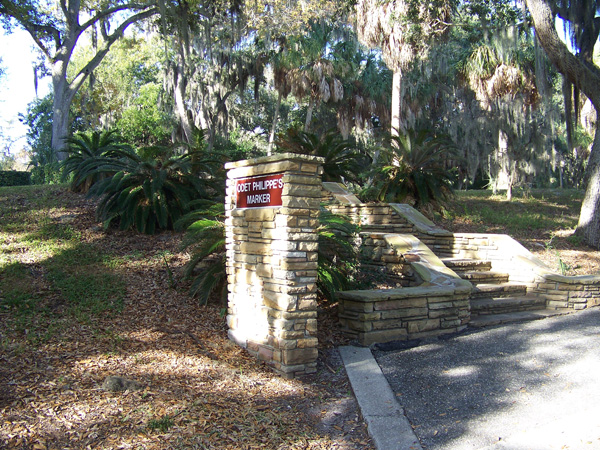

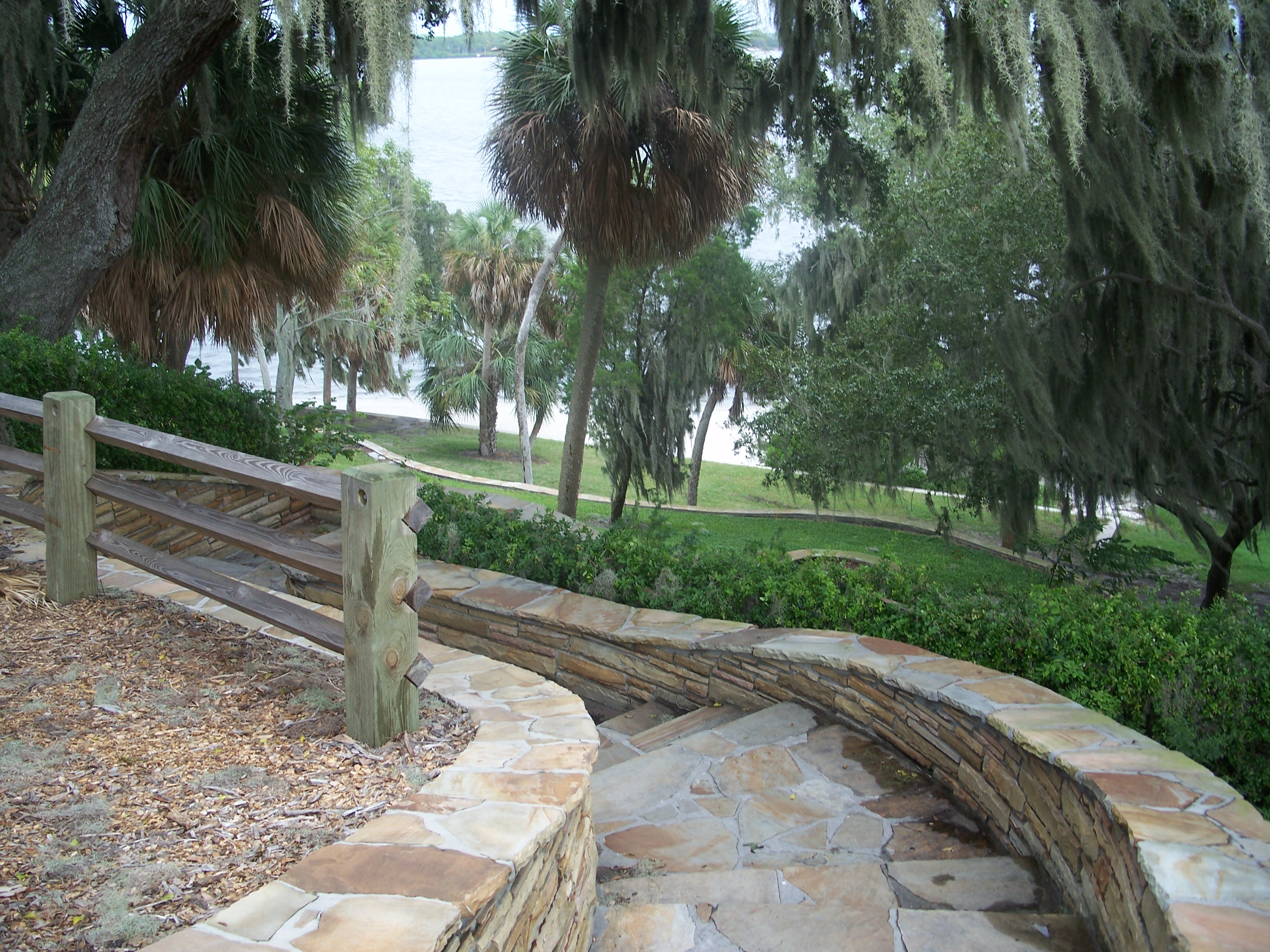

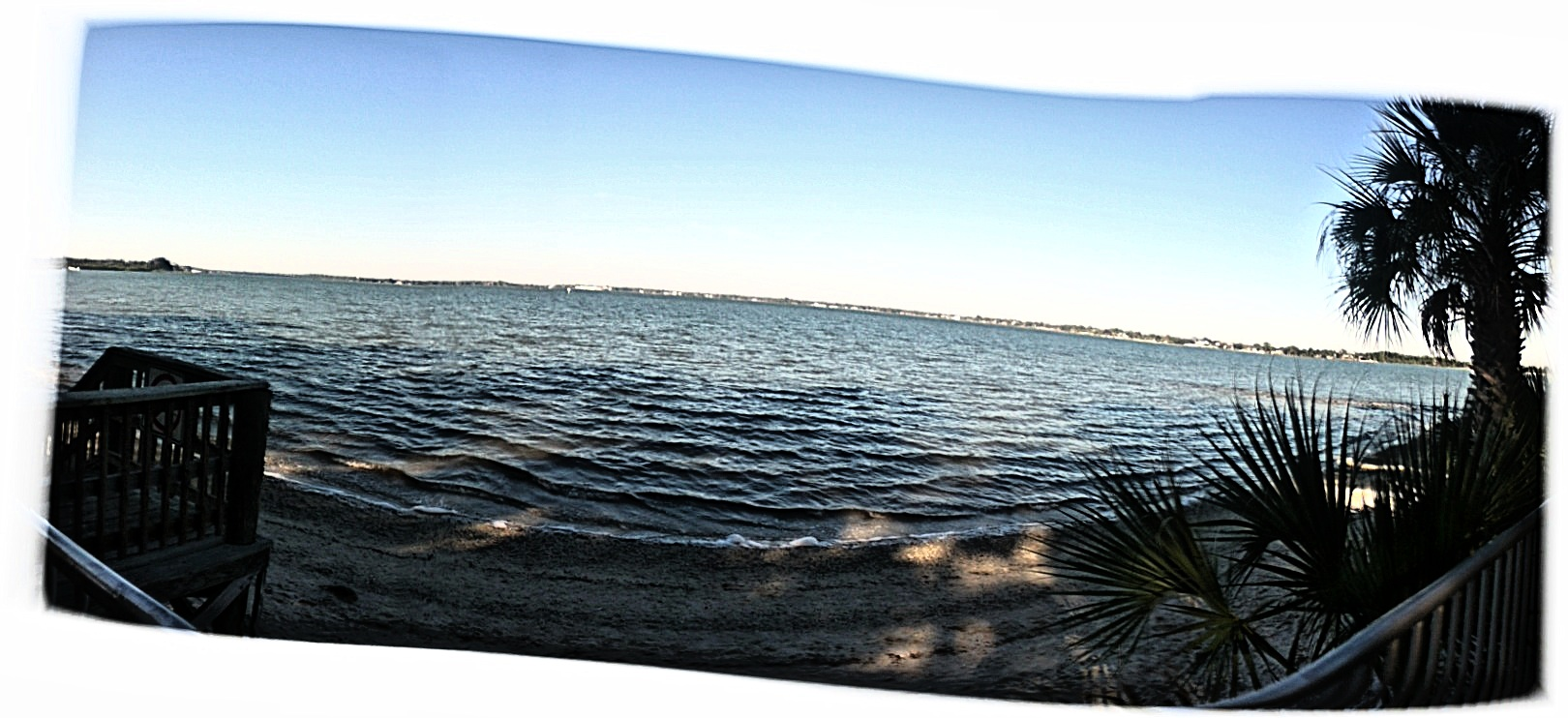

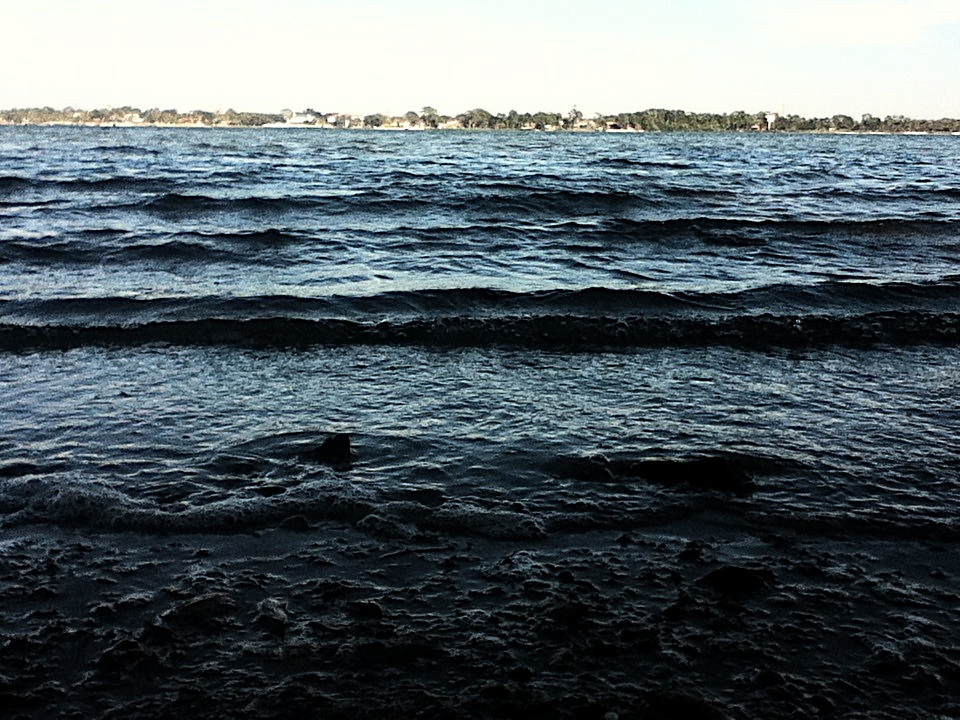

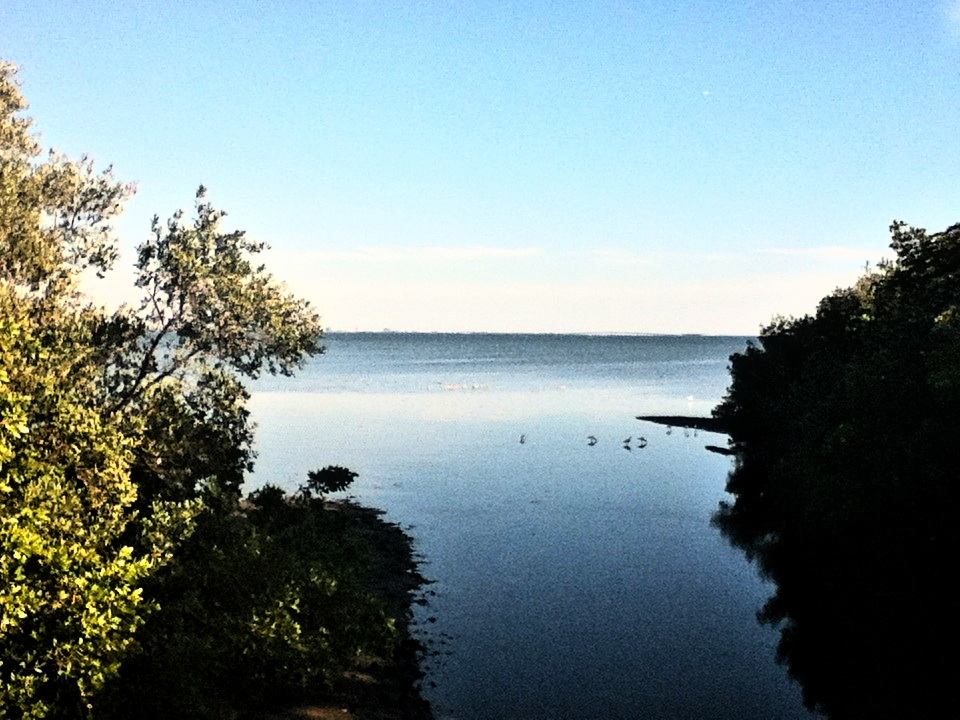

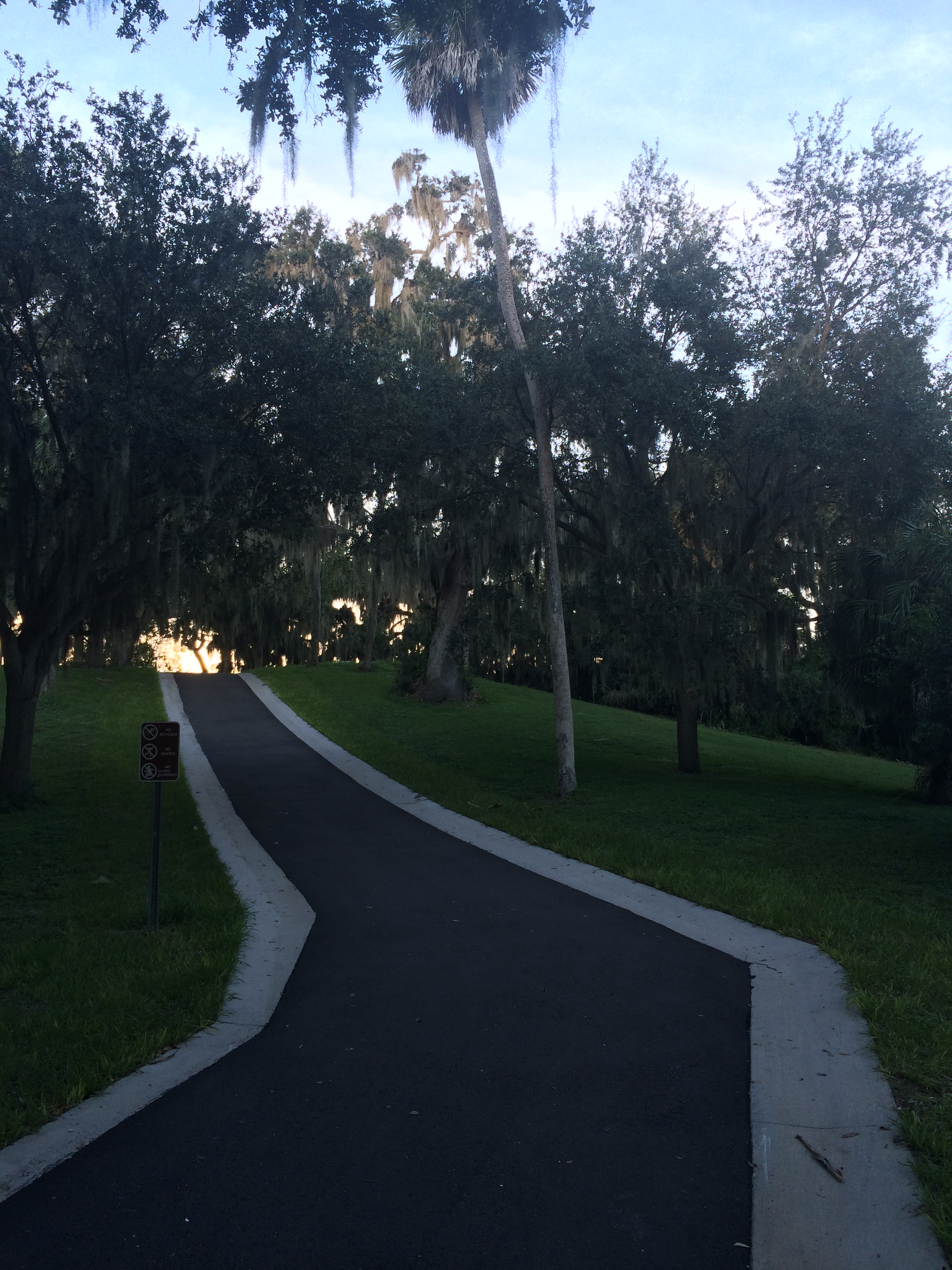

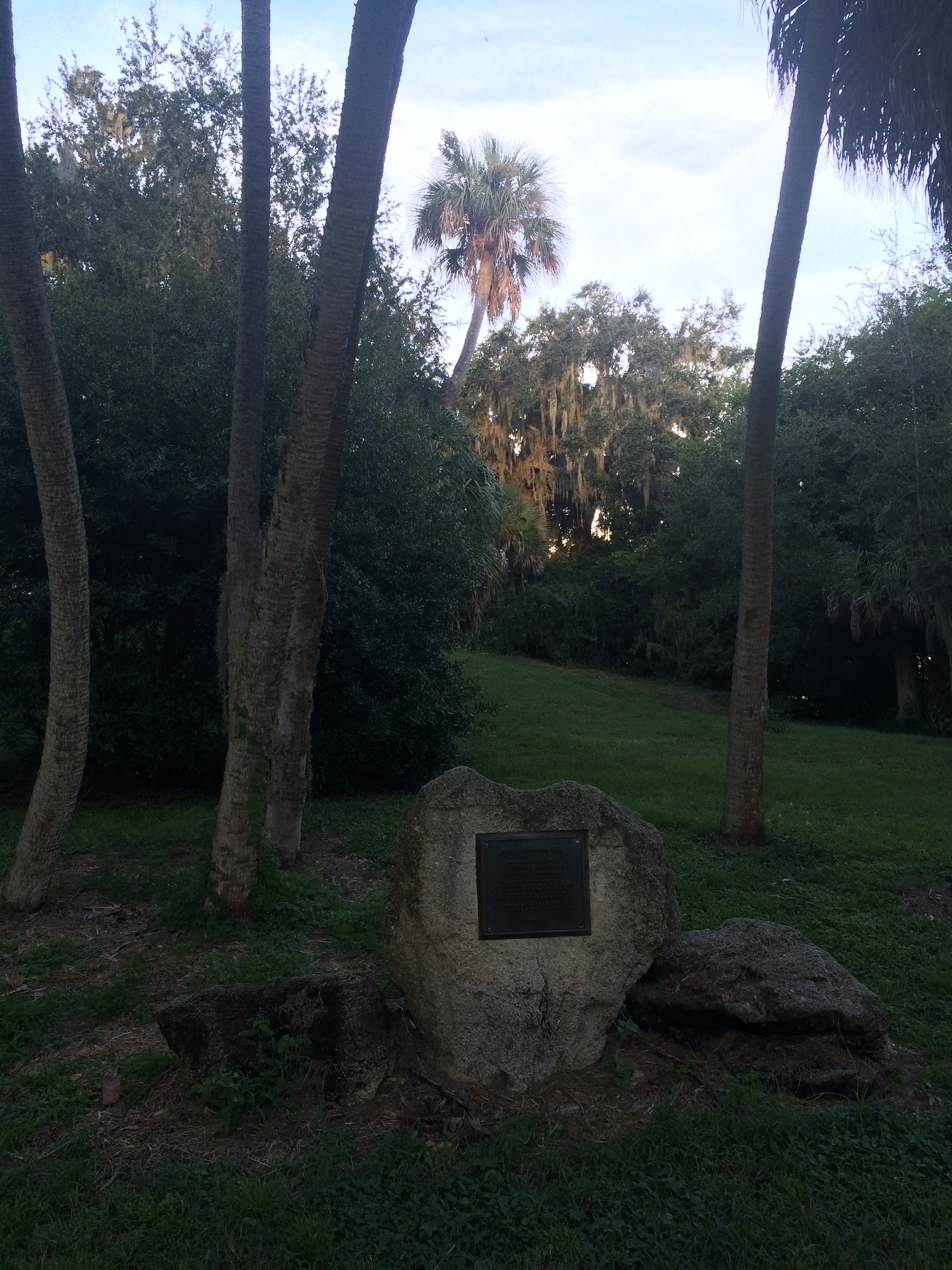

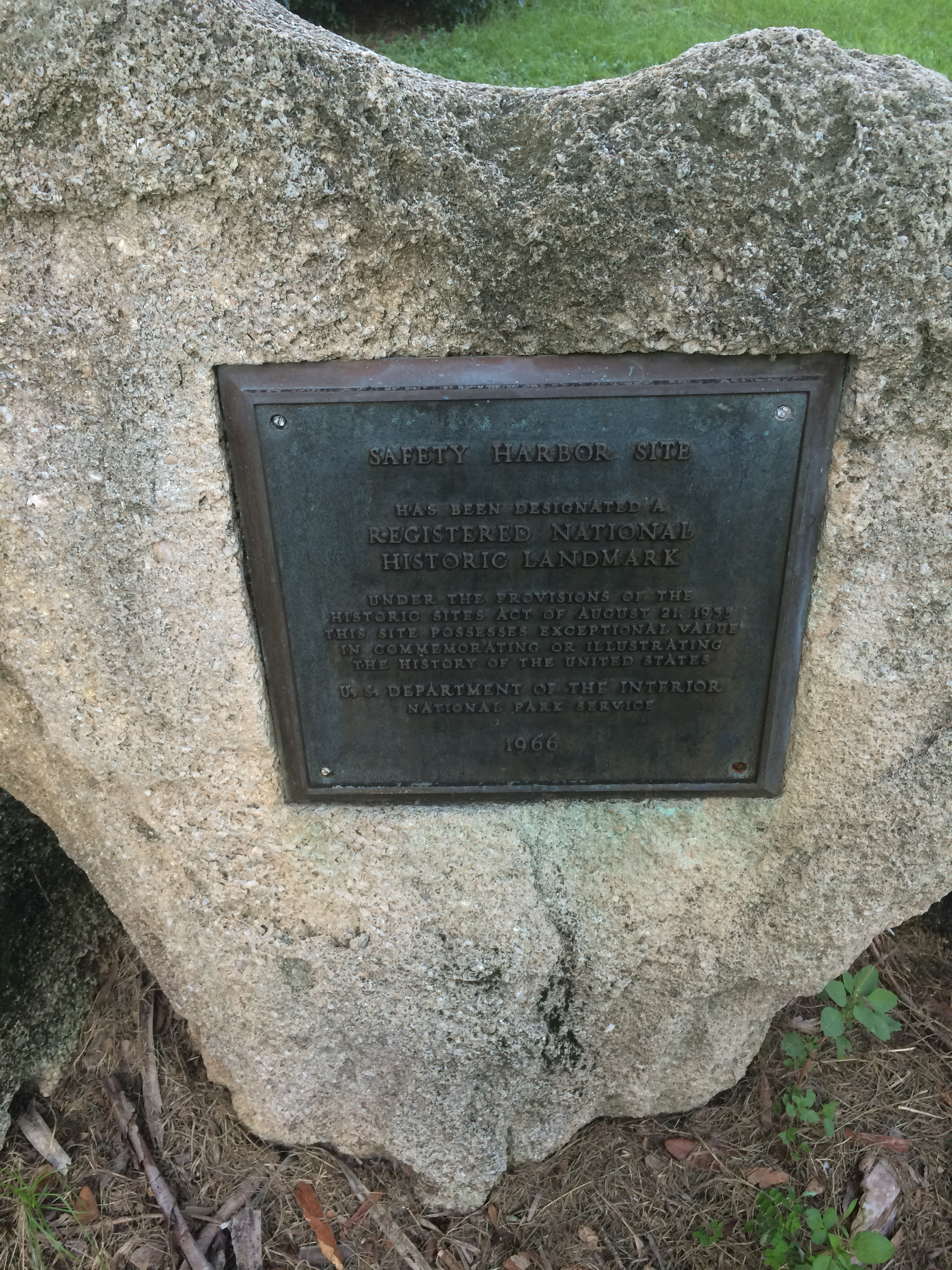

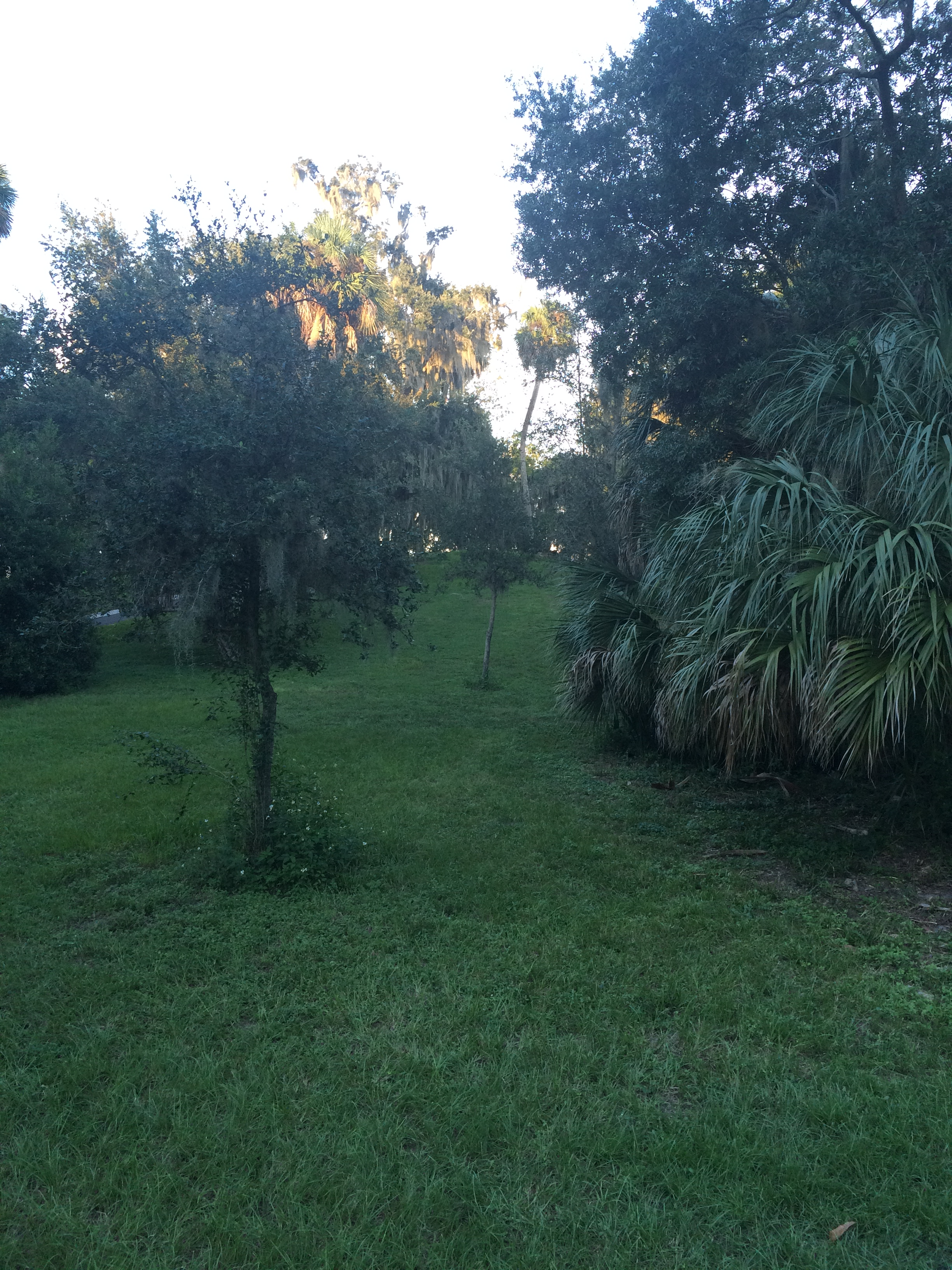
