= Safety Harbor, Florida =

- City
- City of Safety Harbor
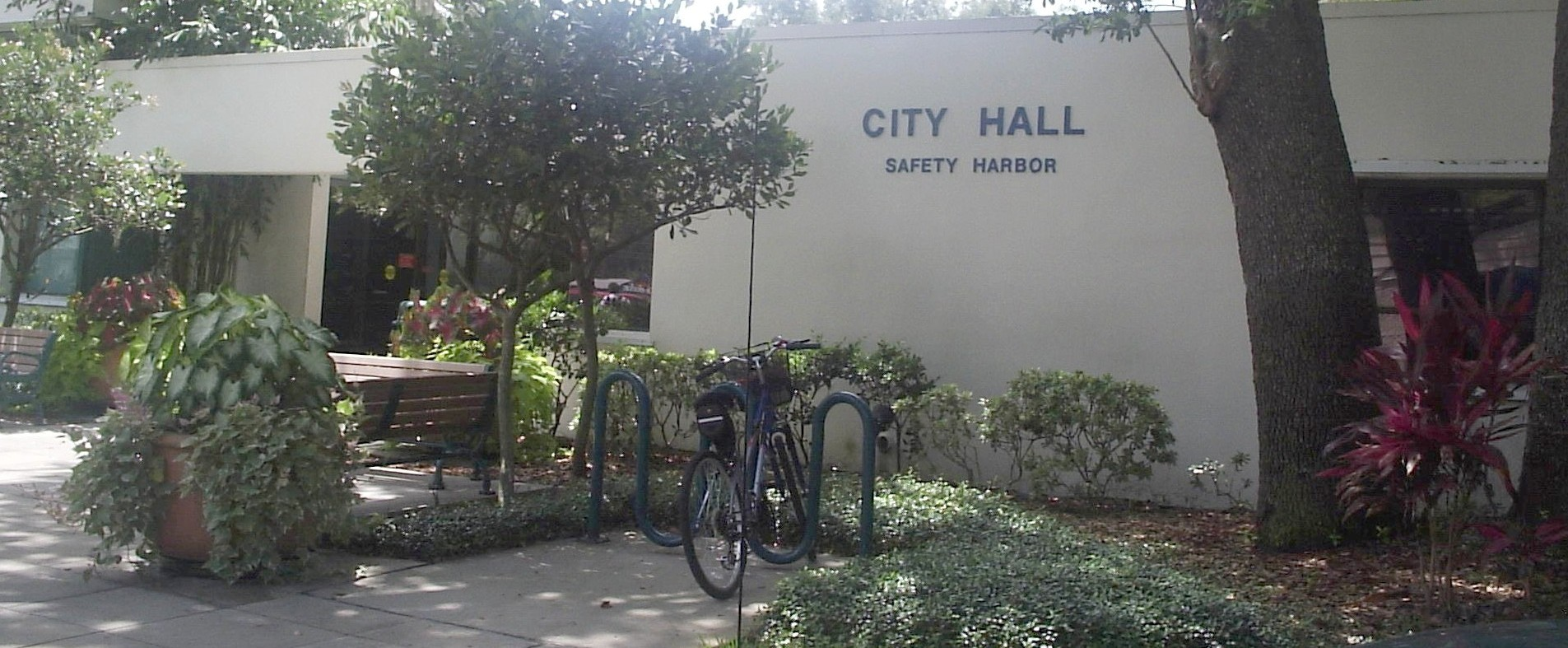
- Safety Harbor City Hall

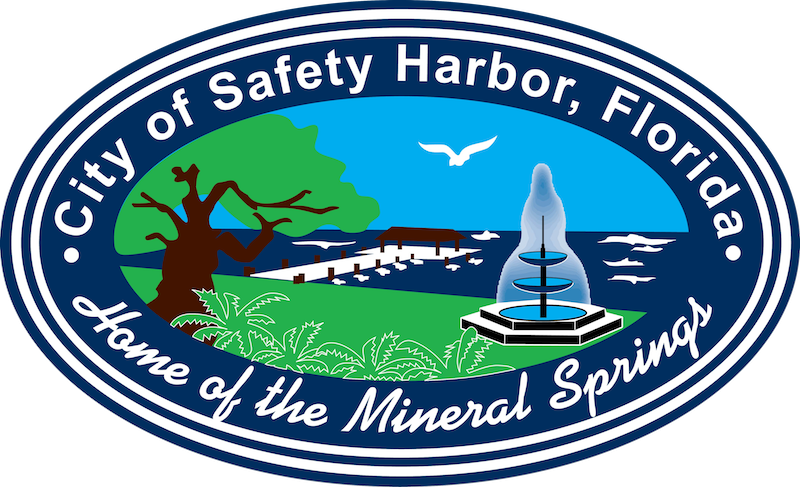
- Seal
- Motto: Home of the Mineral Springs
- Location within Florida Location within the United States
- Coordinates: 28°0.3′N 82°41.7′W
- Country: United States
- State: Florida
- County: Pinellas
- Settled: 1823
- Incorporated: 1917

Area
  - Total: 5.10 sq mi (13.21 km^{2})
  - Land: 4.92 sq mi (12.75 km^{2})
  - Water: 0.18 sq mi (0.46 km^{2})
- Elevation: 20 ft (6 m)

Population (2020)
  - Total: 17,072
  - Estimate (2021): 16,987
  - Density: 3,467.1/sq mi (1,338.66/km^{2})
- Time zone: UTC-5 (Eastern (EST))
  - Summer (DST): UTC-4 (EDT)
- ZIP code: 34695
- Area code: 727
- FIPS code: 12-62425
- GNIS feature ID: 2405388
- Website: www.cityofsafetyharbor.com

Safety Harbor is a city on the west shore of Tampa Bay in Pinellas County, Florida, United States. It was settled in 1823 and incorporated in 1917. Its population was 17,072 at the 2020 census.

== History ==
The area has been inhabited since the Stone Age. In June 2008, a 6,000-year-old spearhead was found at Marshall Street Park. The inhabitants of the area at the time of Spanish exploration were the Tocobaga people, who lived in villages around Tampa Bay. The adaptation of this culture relied on wild resources. Safety Harbor sites have yielded pottery and artifacts of copper, shell, and stone. The Tocobaga were known for constructing various ceremonial and communal mounds to bury the dead. Most of these mounds were destroyed in the early 1900s due to development. However, one of these ceremonial mounds is still visible in Safety Harbor's Phillippe Park (see photo). Shells found in these mounds were used to pave city streets.

In 1528, Spanish explorer Pánfilo de Narváez landed in the area, followed by Hernando de Soto in 1539. Safety Harbor (formerly known as Worth's Harbor and Green's Springs) was first homesteaded by Count Odet Philippe, a French nobleman who is credited with introducing the grapefruit to Florida in 1823. The name Safety Harbor originated from the early 18th century, when pirates were a substantial influence in the area. Once ships reached this area of the bay, all threats from pirates were gone, and it was commonly referred to as a "Safe Harbor".

=== Springs ===
Safety Harbor is the home of the historic Espiritu Santo Springs, or "Springs of the Holy Spirit", a natural mineral spring. Its waters were given this name in 1539 by Spanish explorer Hernando de Soto, who was supposedly searching for the mythical "Fountain of Youth". Prior to the Spanish exploration of Florida, the Tocobaga and Timuquan tribes are believed to have fished and bathed in the spring's waters.

In the 20th century, Espiritu Santo water was bottled and sold commercially, and later a health spa and hotel were built over the springs. The Safety Harbor Resort and Spa, as it is now known, continues to be a prominent visitor attraction in Pinellas County. In 1964, the site was designated a historical landmark by the U.S. Department of the Interior and in 1997, a Florida heritage landmark.

== Geography ==
The city is located on the west side of Safety Harbor, a waterway connected to Tampa Bay.

According to the U.S. Census Bureau, the city has a total area of 5.1 square miles (13 km^{2}), of which 0.1 sq mi (0.26 km^{2}) (2.57%) is covered by water.

== Demographics ==
Historical population
Census	Pop.	Note	%±
1920	429		—
1930	765		78.3%
1940	694		−9.3%
1950	894		28.8%
1960	1,787		99.9%
1970	3,103		73.6%
1980	6,461		108.2%
1990	15,124		134.1%
2000	17,203		13.7%
2010	16,884		−1.9%
2020	17,072		1.1%
2021 (est.)	16,987	▼	−0.5%
U.S. Decennial Census

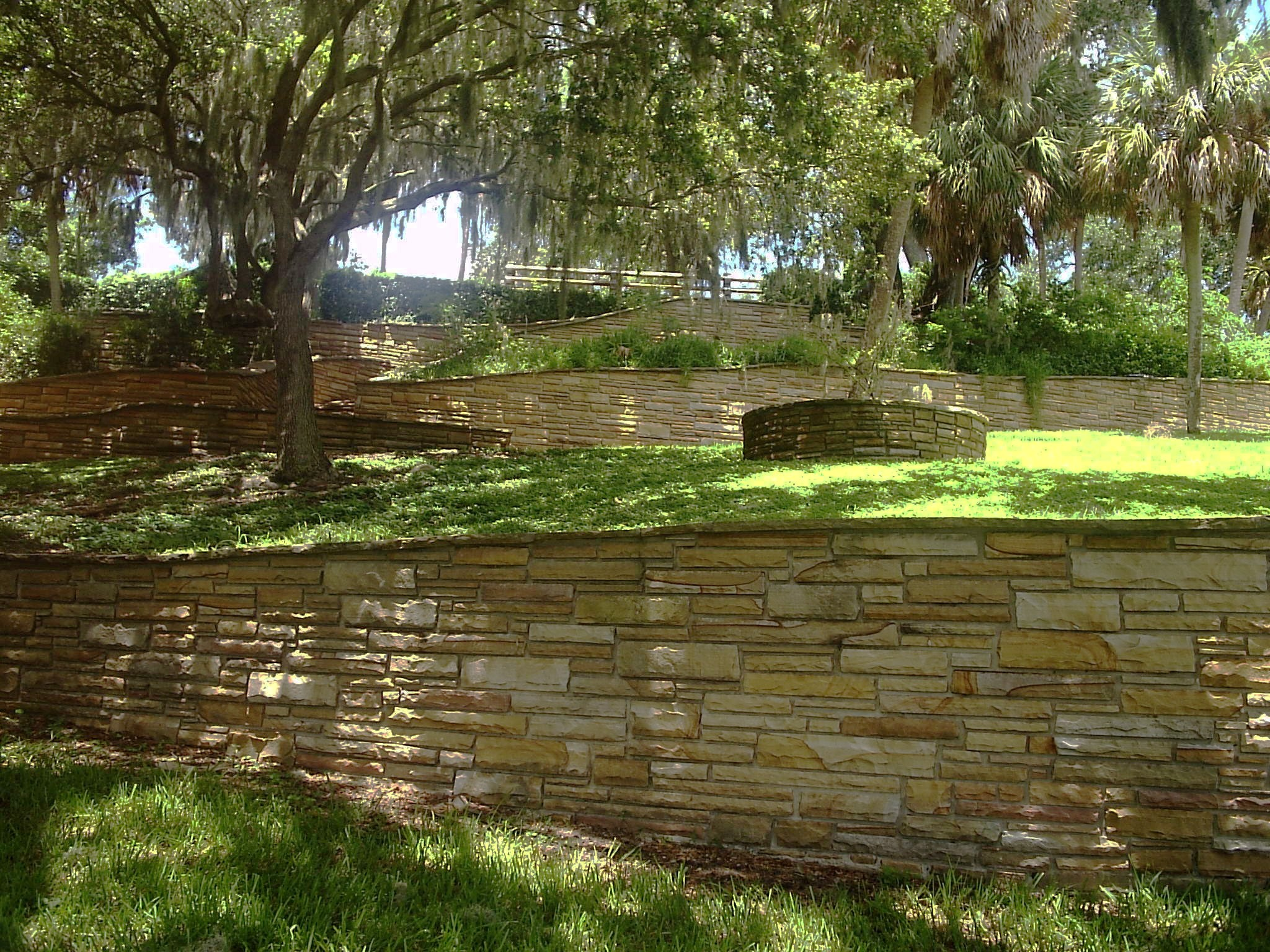
Tocobaga Indian Mound in Philippe Park

=== Racial and ethnic composition ===
Safety Harbor racial composition (Hispanics excluded from racial categories) (NH = Non-Hispanic)
Race	Pop 2010	Pop 2020	% 2010	% 2020
White (NH)	14,406	13,651	85.32%	79.96%
Black or African American (NH)	742	606	4.39%	3.55%
Native American or Alaska Native (NH)	22	31	0.13%	0.18%
Asian (NH)	435	486	2.58%	2.85%
Pacific Islander or Native Hawaiian (NH)	6	3	0.04%	0.02%
Some other race (NH)	33	60	0.20%	0.35%
Two or more races/multiracial (NH)	266	737	1.58%	4.32%
Hispanic or Latino (any race)	974	1,498	5.77%	8.77%
Total	16,884	17,072		

=== 2020 census ===
As of the 2020 census, Safety Harbor had a population of 17,072. The median age was 51.8 years; 16.8% of residents were under 18 and 26.4% were 65 or older. For every 100 females, there were 89.9 males, and for every 100 females 18 and over, there were 87.3 males 18 and over.

All of the residents lived in urban areas, while none lived in rural areas. Of the 7,455 households in Safety Harbor, 22.5% had children under 18 living in them, 50.0% were married-couple households, 15.2% were households with a male householder and no spouse or partner present, and 28.2% were households with a female householder and no spouse or partner present. About 29.2% of all households were made up of individuals, and 15.3% had someone living alone who was 65 or older. As of the 2020 census, 4,781 families resided in the city.

Of the 8,049 housing units, 7.4% were vacant. The homeowner vacancy rate was 1.1% and the rental vacancy rate was 8.1%.

=== 2010 census ===
As of the 2010 United States census, 16,884 people, 7,073 households, and 4,750 families lived in the city.

=== 2000 census ===
As of the census of 2000, 17,203 people, 7,084 households, and 4,845 families were residing in the city. The population density was 3,498.3 inhabitants per square mile (1,350.7/km^{2}). There were 7,483 housing units at an average density of 1,521.7 per square mile (587.5/km^{2}). The racial makeup of the city is 92.23% White, 4.14% African American, 0.24% Native American, 1.68% Asian, 0.05% Pacific Islander, 0.44% from other races, and 1.21% from two or more races. About 3.65% of the population were Hispanics or Latinos of any race.

Of the 7,084 households, 28.8% had children under 18 living with them, 56.3% were married couples living together, 9.1% had a female householder with no husband present, and 31.6% were not families. Around 25.2% of all households were made up of individuals, and 8.5% had someone living alone who was 65 or older. The average household size was 2.37, and the average family size was 2.85.

The age distributionwas 21.8% under 18, 4.9% from 18 to 24, 28.6% from 25 to 44, 27.4% from 45 to 64, and 17.3% were 65 or older. The median age was 42 years. For every 100 females, there were 91.0 males. For every 100 females 18 and over, there were 87.1 males.

In 2000, the median income in the city for a household was $51,378 and for a family was $59,911. Males had a median income of $41,883 versus $31,165 for females. The per capita income for the city was $28,632. About 3.6% of families and 5.6% of the population were below the poverty line, including 5.1% of those under 18 and 8.3% of those 65 or over.

== Arts and culture ==
=== Library ===
The Safety Harbor Public Library was founded in 1938 by the Women's Civic Club of Safety Harbor with funds from the federal Works Progress Administration (WPA) program. The library was originally housed inside the Community House located at 2nd St. N and 6th Ave N. On November 25, 1938, Daisy Cahow was appointed by the WPA as the First Librarian. To supply the library collection, the Women's Civic Club paid the transportation charges to borrow 50 books from the state and return them at regular intervals. As the collection was expanded it quickly outgrew the space. In 1946, Dr. Salem Baranoff, owner of the Safety Harbor Spa, purchased and donated two empty lots on 2nd St. N and 5th Ave N for the new library. Construction for the new building began on March 4, 1949, and the library opened in November 1949. The Women's Civic Club continued to operate the library in its new building, but by 1978, providing adequate funding had become difficult for the club on its own. The property was deeded to the City of Safety Harbor in exchange for yearly funding, and the Civic Club continued to operate the library until October 1980, when full operation was taken over by the city. As the population of the city continued to grow, the library again outgrew the space and construction of a new building began in 1993 at its current location on 2nd Ave N, with the new library opening on October 1, 1994. In February 2024, construction began on a second-floor addition to the current library. Safety Harbor Public Library is part of the Pinellas Public Library Cooperative.

== Government ==
Safety Harbor is governed by an elected mayor and city commission. The city’s departments are administered by a city manager, who is appointed by the commission. The current mayor is Joe Ayoub. The city commissioners are Vice Mayor Carlos Diaz, Andy Steingold, Nancy Besore, and Jacob Burnett. The city manager is Josh Stefancic.

== Education ==
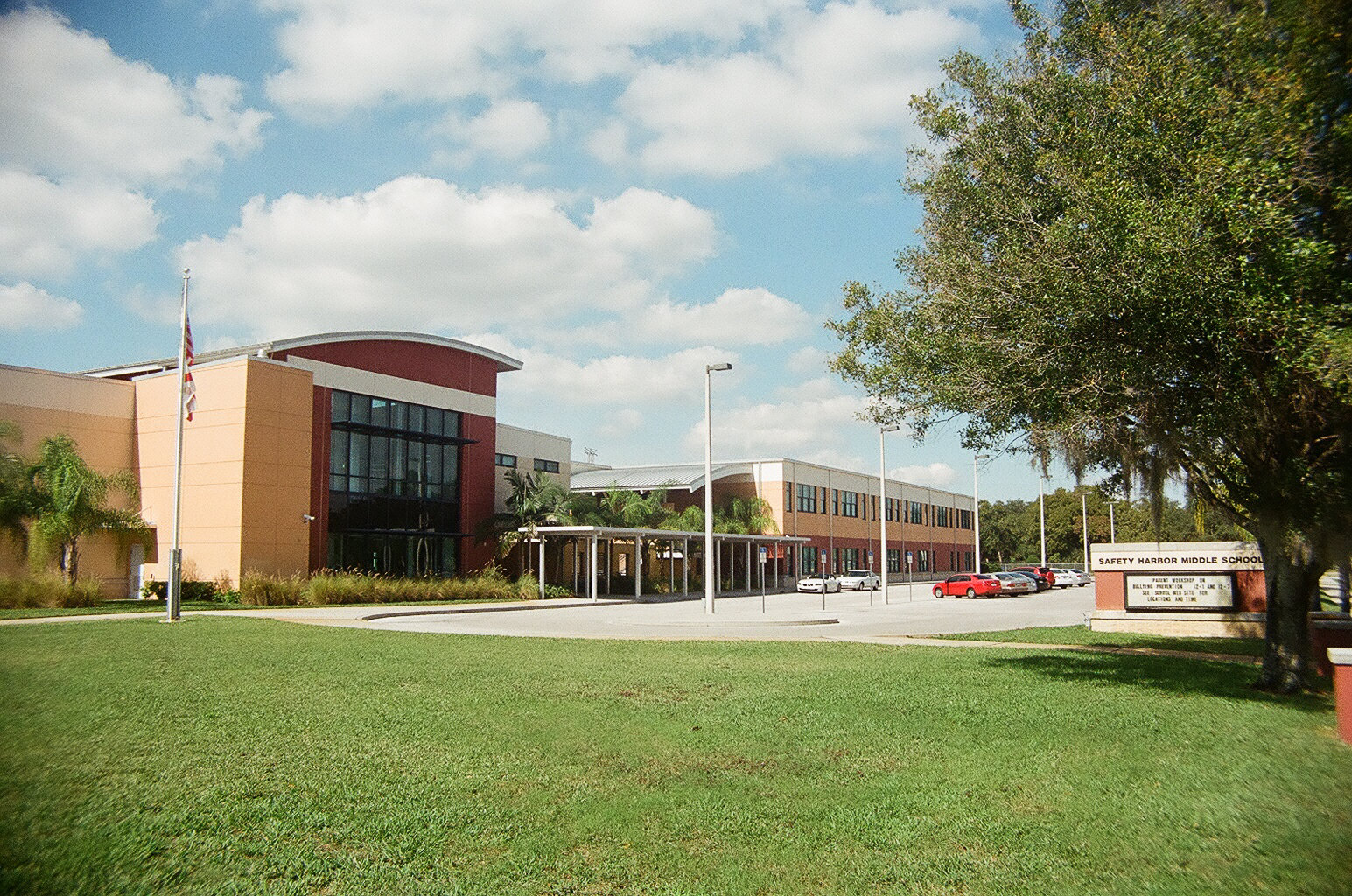
Safety Harbor Middle School

Two public schools are within the city: Safety Harbor Elementary School for grades one to five, and Safety Harbor Middle School for grades 6 to 8.

== Infrastructure ==
The CSX Railroad branch line from Tampa to St. Petersburg bisects Safety Harbor. Passenger trains last used the line in 1984.

== Notable people ==
- Matt Geiger, NBA professional basketball player
- Alan Lomax, collector of folk music, folklorist, and writer
- Dave Martinez, MLB professional baseball player and manager
- Taffy Nivert, singer and songwriter with Starland Vocal Band
- Tom Rowland, mayor of Cleveland, Tennessee
- Robin Zander, musician with Cheap Trick
