= John Lunan =

Planter and magistrate in Jamaica

John Lunan (died 1838) was a planter and magistrate in Jamaica. He was elected to the House of Assembly of Jamaica in 1820.
