= Poorman, Alaska =

Unincorporated community in the state of Alaska, United States

Poorman
- Unincorporated community
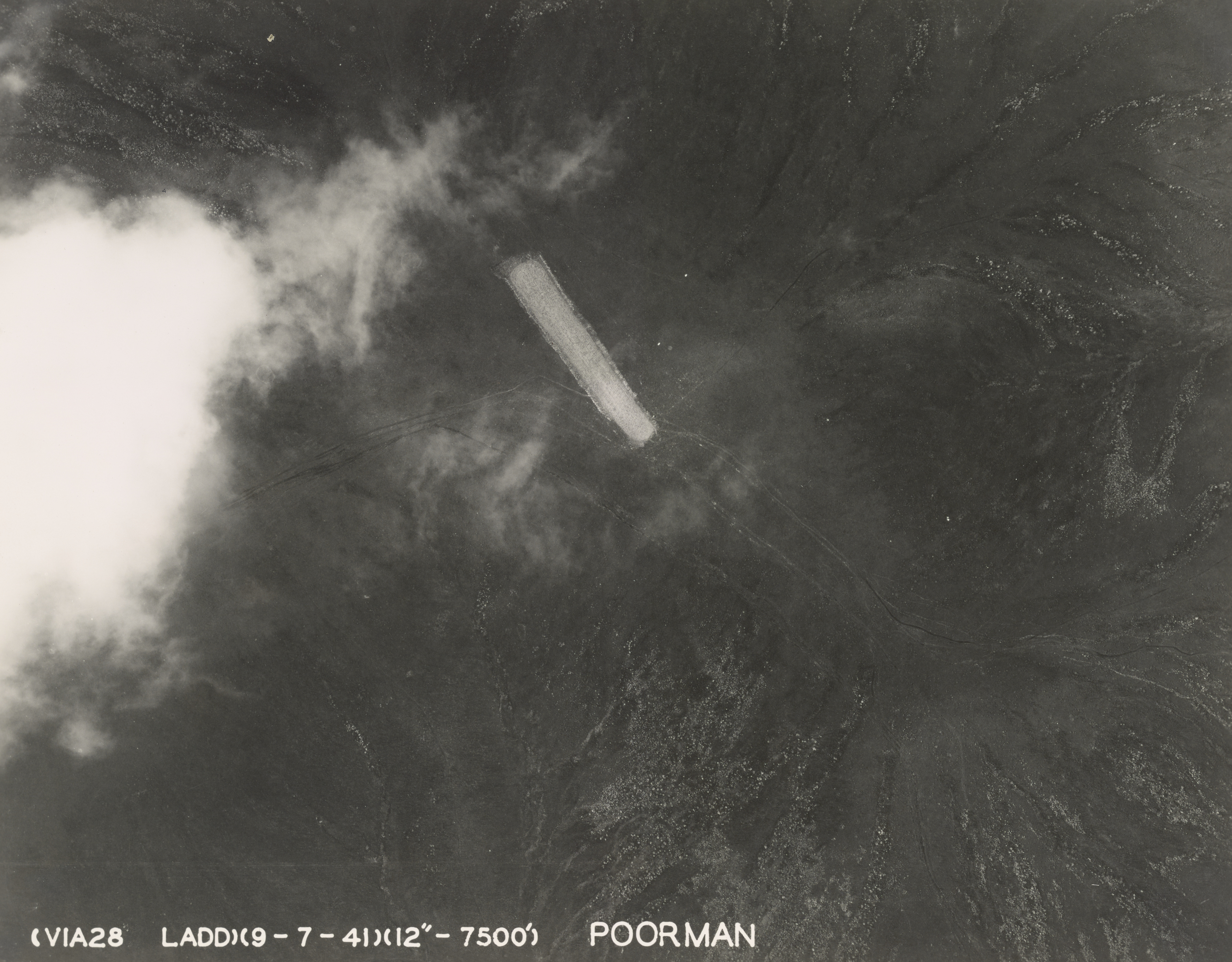
- Airstrip at Poorman, 1941

- Location within the state of Alaska
- Coordinates: 64°5′58″N 155°32′38″W
- Country: United States
- State: Alaska
- Census area: Yukon-Koyukuk

Government
  - State senator: Donald Olson (D)
  - State rep.: Neal Foster (R)
- Elevation: 502 ft (153 m)
- Time zone: UTC-9 (Alaska (AKST))
  - Summer (DST): UTC-8 (AKDT)
- GNIS feature ID: 1408178

Poorman is an unincorporated community in the Yukon-Koyukuk Census Area of the Unorganized Borough of the U.S. state of Alaska, in the Kilbuck-Kuskokwin Mountains. It lies along the left bank of Poorman Creek on an unpaved road 44 miles (71 km) south of the city of Ruby on the Yukon River. Its elevation is 502 feet (153 m). Founded as a gold mining camp in 1913, Poorman possessed a post office from 1915 to 1932. The community's name (given for the nearby Poorman Creek) was officially decided by the Board on Geographic Names in 1944.
