= New Zealand grapefruit =

Citrus fruit

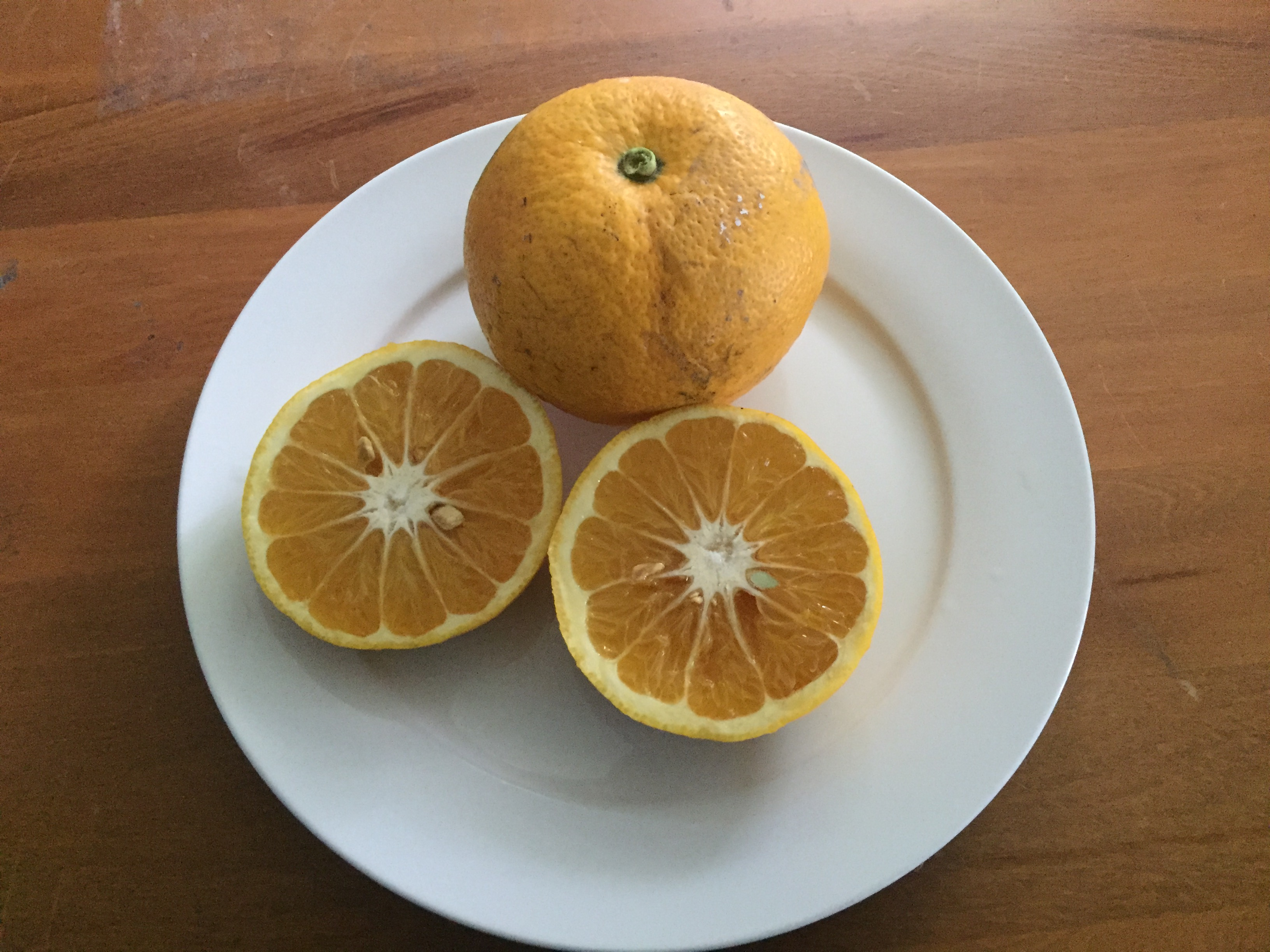
- A cut and uncut New Zealand Grapefruit (poorman "orange")
- Genus: Citrus
- Hybrid parentage: Citrus grandis × Citrus reticulata
- Origin: New Zealand

The New Zealand grapefruit, also known as the Poorman, Poorman orange, poorman's orange, poor man's orange, and goldfruit, is a type of citrus fruit grown in New Zealand. Despite its name, it is not genetically a true grapefruit, but rather is believed to be a hybrid between a pomelo and a mandarin or tangelo.

== Origin ==
The New Zealand grapefruit is thought to have originated in East Asia, and is said to have been brought to Australia from Shanghai by a Captain Simpson, though at least one early-19th-century report described this original import as a shaddock (pomelo), leaving open the possibility that the founding poorman hybridisation may have occurred in Australia. It was introduced into New Zealand from Australia around 1855 by Sir George Grey, and provided by Grey in 1861 to John Morrison of Warkworth, namesake of what became the most widely grown New Zealand clone.

== Description ==
The tree is large and vigorous, with rough greyish-brown bark. The petioles of its dark green leaves are more similar to mandarin orange and bitter orange than the true grapefruit. The ovate to globose fruit has a wrinkled, medium-thick, pale orange-yellow rind when mature. The juicy, yellowish-orange, coarse-textured flesh has a subacidic, pleasant flavour with a trace of bitterness. The fruit contain numerous monoembryonic seeds, although the important variant, 'Morrison Seedless' (or Morrison's Seedless), produces seedless fruit when not cross-pollinated.

It does not require temperatures as high as other similar citrus, growing in New Zealand and cooler regions of southern California where other commercial grapefruits are not viable. This explains its dominance in New Zealand, while in Australia it cannot compete in popularity with locally grown cultivars.

== Strains ==
The long-dominant strain of the New Zealand grapefruit was the Morrison Seedless, but in the 1980s this was surpassed by a bud sport called the 'Golden Special' developed in a commercial orchard in Tauranga. In the 1970s, a grapefruit identical to the latter but with a deep orange rind, the 'Cutler Red’, was selected at Kerikeri.
