= Odet Philippe =

American settler

Odet Philippe was the first permanent, non-native settler on the Pinellas peninsula in what is now the state of Florida, acquiring 160 acres (0.65 km^{2}) of land in what is today Safety Harbor in 1842. He was a successful businessman who introduced cigar making and citrus to the Tampa Bay region. His descendants, including the McMullen and Booth families (for whom McMullen-Booth Road is named), are among the county’s most well known pioneer clans.

Philippe was buried in Philippe Park – his former plantation – in 1869, but the exact location of the gravesite is unknown.

== Grave marker inscription ==
Odet Philippe
Born Lyon, France, 1787
Died at this Site 1869

As the first European
settler in Pinellas County
he established St. Helena
Plantation, now Philippe Park
Philippe was the first
to cultivate grapefruit
in Florida and introduced
cigar-making to Tampa
His descendants populated
this frontier. He was
said to be a doctor
and of noble birth

== Gallery ==
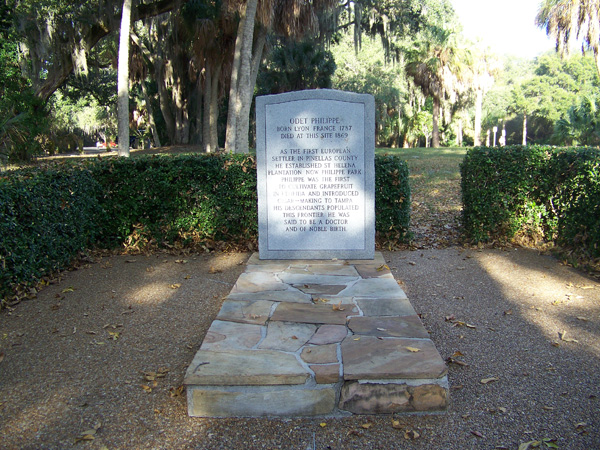

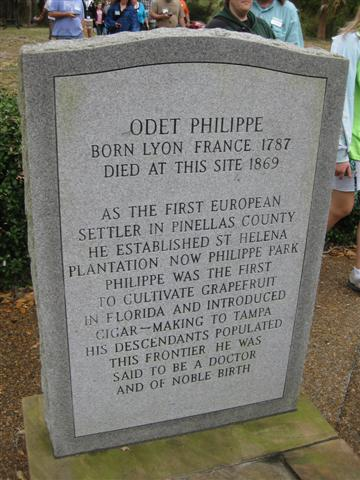

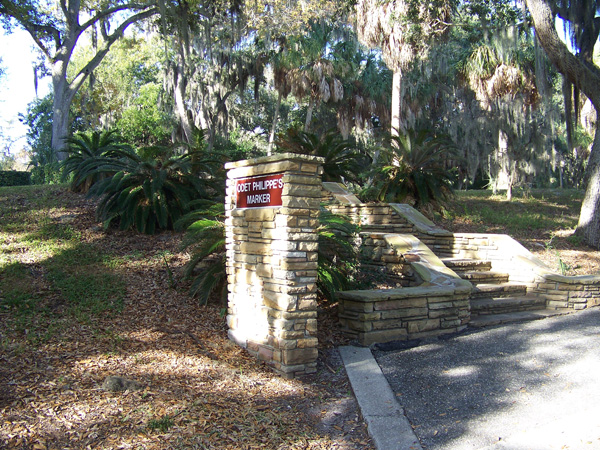

== See also ==
- Philippe Park
- Safety Harbor site
