= Florida State Road 686 =

State highway in Florida, United States

State Road 686
- SR 686 in red, SR 686A in green, CR 416 in blue

Route information
- Maintained by FDOT
- Length: 10.823 mi (17.418 km)

Major junctions
- West end: US 19 Alt. in Largo
- US 19 in Largo; SR 686A in Largo; I-275 in St. Petersburg
- East end: US 92 / SR 687 / SR 694 in St. Petersburg

Location
- Country: United States
- State: Florida
- Counties: Pinellas

Highway system
- Florida State Highway System; Interstate; US; State; Former; Pre‑1945; Toll; Scenic
← SR 685	→ SR 686A

State Road 686 (SR 686) is an east–west route in Pinellas County, running from U.S. Route 19 Alternate (Alt. US 19) in Largo east to an intersection with SR 687 (4th Street) and SR 694 (Gandy Boulevard) in St. Petersburg, Florida. Originally, SR 686 extended further west, ending at Gulf Boulevard in Belleair Beach, next to the shores of the Gulf of Mexico.

== Route description ==
SR 686 begins at US 19 Alt, running east as East Bay Drive. It runs through Largo, where it crosses an interchange with US 19 and east of the intersection, SR 686 is known as Roosevelt Boulevard, named for President Franklin Delano Roosevelt. It then travels in a southeastern direction through Clearwater, intersecting CR 611 south of the Bayside Bridge and on the west side of St. Pete–Clearwater International Airport. Here, SR 686A begins and runs raised in the median of SR 686 until it intersects SR 688 (Ulmerton Road). SR 686 then heads east with a concurrency with SR 688 for just under a mile. At the end of the concurrency, SR 686 once again heads southeast, entering St. Petersburg. An interchange with Interstate 275 (I-275) follows, and SR 686 ends at the intersection with SR 687 (4th Street) and SR 694 (Gandy Boulevard).

=== Major intersections ===
The entire route is in Pinellas County.

Location	mi	km	Destinations	Notes
Largo	0.000	0.000	US 19 Alt. (Missouri Avenue / Seminole Boulevard / SR 595) / West Bay Drive (CR 416 west) – Clearwater, Seminole, Beaches	Western terminus
Largo	0.789	1.270	CR 375 north (Highland Avenue)	
Largo	1.157	1.862	Alternate Keene Road (CR 395 north)	
Largo	1.548	2.491	CR 1 (Keene Road / Starkey Road)	
Largo	2.567	4.131	Belcher Road (CR 501)	
Largo	3.55	5.71	US 19 (SR 55) – Clearwater, Pinellas Park, St. Petersburg	Interchange
Largo	4.061	6.536	62nd Street North (CR 565 south)	
Largo	4.732	7.615	Avalon Avenue (CR 595 south)	
Largo	5.46	8.79	SR 686A south / CR 611 (Bayside Bridge / 49th Street) – Clearwater, Pinellas Park	Interchange
	6.079	9.783	St. Pete–Clearwater International Airport	
Pinellas Park	6.903	11.109	SR 688 west (Ulmerton Road) – Indian Rocks Beach	Interchange; west end of SR 688 overlap; no access from SR 688 east to SR 686 west
St. Petersburg	7.867	12.661	SR 688 east (Ulmerton Road) to I-275 north – Tampa	Interchange; east end of SR 688 overlap
Pinellas Park–St. Petersburg line	8.503	13.684	28th Street North (CR 682 south)	
St. Petersburg	9.31	14.98	I-275 (SR 93) – Tampa, St. Petersburg	Exit 30 (I-275)
St. Petersburg	10.272	16.531	CR 803 (Dr. Martin Luther King Jr. Street North) to I-275 north – Tampa, St. Petersburg	
St. Petersburg	10.823	17.418	US 92 / SR 694 west (Gandy Boulevard / 4th Street North / SR 600 east / SR 687)	Eastern terminus
1.000 mi = 1.609 km; 1.000 km = 0.621 mi: Concurrency terminus

=== State Road 686A ===
State Road 686A
- Location: St. Petersburg
- Length: 2.8 mi (4.5 km)

State Road 686A (SR 686A) is a controlled-access toll road in St. Petersburg. The route begins at CR 611 just south of the Bayside Bridge in Largo, along SR 686 (Roosevelt Boulevard), before branching off until terminating at SR 690, another controlled-access toll road, where it runs along CR 296 (118th Avenue) in Pinellas Park. SR 686A and SR 690 both constitute the Gateway Expressway.

SR 686A is 2.8 miles (4.5 km) long, while SR 690 is 3.2 miles (5.1 km) long. SR 690 runs from US 19 in Pinellas Park east along CR 296 before terminating at I-275 in St. Petersburg.

=== County Road 416 ===
County Road 416
- Location: Largo
- Length: 3.47 mi (5.58 km)

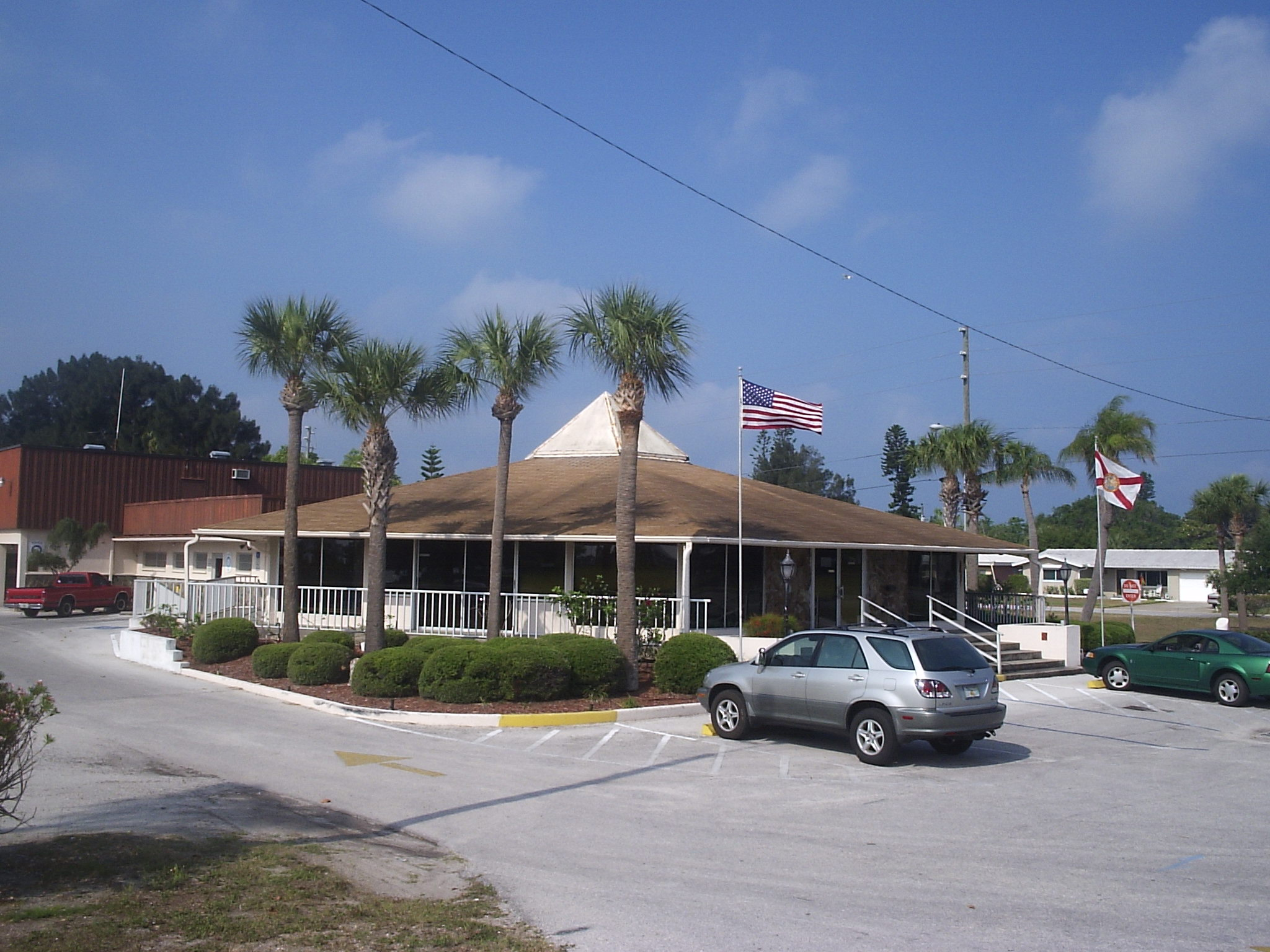
The Belleair Beach City Hall is located at 444 Causeway Blvd

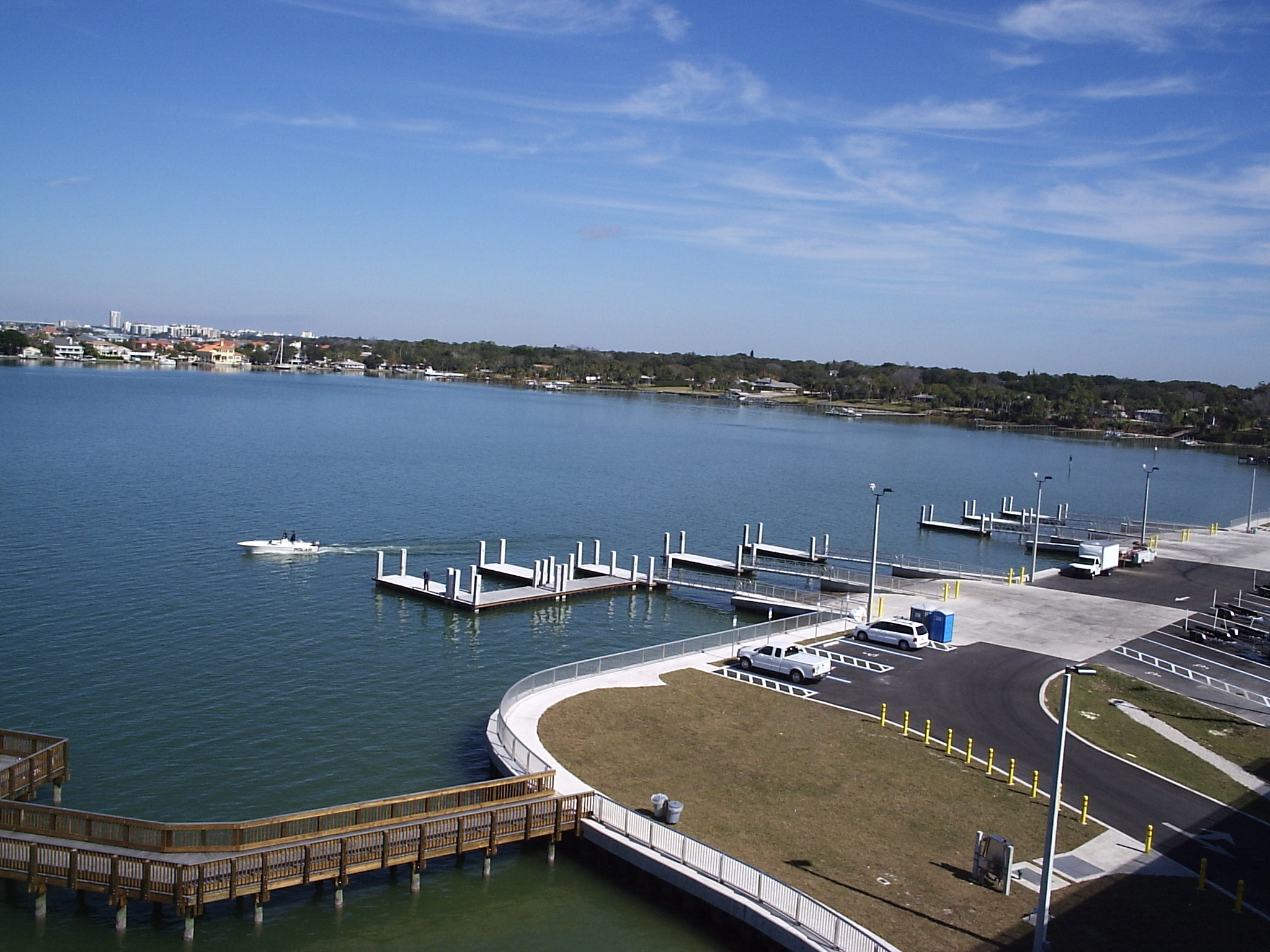
Looking northeast from new Belleair Causeway bridge over intracoastal water toward Belleair and Belleair Shore; Pinellas County Boatramp Park in foreground

County Road 416 extends from Gulf Boulevard in Belleair Beach, east to Seminole Boulevard/Missouri Avenue in Largo. The entirety of the route was previously signed as SR 686. From Gulf Boulevard in Belleair Beach, through Belleair Bluffs to Indian Rocks Road, the road is called the Belleair Causeway. In Largo, it becomes West Bay Drive. West Bay Drive is historically Largo's "Main Street".
