= Gateway Expressway =

Tolled highway in Florida

Gateway Expressway
- State Road 690, State Road 686A
- SR 690 in red, SR 686A in blue

Route information
- Existed: 2024–present
- History: Approved February 2014; Construction started August 21, 2017; Opened April 26, 2024

State Road 690
- West end: US 19 in Pinellas Park
- Major intersections: SR 686A in Pinellas Park
- East end: I-275 in St. Petersburg

State Road 686A
- South end: SR 690 in Pinellas Park
- North end: SR 686 / CR 611 in Largo

Location
- Country: United States
- State: Florida
- Counties: Pinellas

Highway system
- Florida State Highway System; Interstate; US; State; Former; Pre‑1945; Toll; Scenic
| ← SR 688 | SR 690 | → SR 693 |
| ← SR 686 | SR 686A | → SR 687 |

The Gateway Expressway is a controlled-access toll road in Pinellas County, Florida completed in April 2024 at a cost of $598 million. The project consists of two branches: an elevated highway designated State Road 690 (SR 690) above 118th Avenue North between Interstate 275 (I-275) and U.S. Highway 19 (US 19) and a raised highway designated State Road 686A (SR 686A) in the median of SR 686 from 118th Avenue North to the Bayside Bridge. Construction was approved in February 2014, began in November 2017, and completed on April 26, 2024.

== Route description ==
The Gateway Expressway consists of two four-lane, controlled-access segments:

- An elevated mainline running above 118th Avenue from US 19 to I-275. It is designated as SR 690.
- A raised branch running in the median of SR 686 from CR 611 to SR 690. It is designated as SR 686A.

Both segments are tolled using electronic toll gantries for SunPass transponders or toll-by-plate billing.

The project includes express lanes on I-275 from south of Gandy Boulevard to 4th Street North, where they will meet express lanes under construction as part of the new Howard Frankland Bridge project.

== History ==
The intention of the Gateway Expressway project is to mitigate transportation problems in Pinellas County, where several expressway projects were cancelled in the 1970s and 1980s, leaving the county without any major limited-access thoroughfares except for I-275. Significant upgrades to US 19 in the 2000s improved traffic flow north–south in the county. However, only local roads travel east–west. The Gateway Expressway project had been identified for a long time as a priority project to improve traffic flow in Pinellas County.

The project was announced by Governor Rick Scott in a press conference with local officials on February 17, 2014. It had been in the works for 15 years. Construction began in November 2017 at a cost of $598 million. The project was not expected to be funded for another 15–20 years. Funding was provided by the Federal Highway Administration ($153 million), Penny for Pinellas funds ($53 million), and the State of Florida (remainder of project costs). The project was officially completed on April 26, 2024, and the highway was open free of charge for 7 days.

== Exit list ==
=== State Road 690 ===
The entire route is in Pinellas County.

| Location | mi | km | Destinations | Notes |
|---|---|---|---|---|
| Pinellas Park | 0.000 | 0.000 | US 19 north – Clearwater | Western terminus of SR 690 |
| Pinellas Park | 1.0 | 1.6 | CR 296 west (Bryan Dairy Road) to US 19 south | Westbound exit and eastbound entrance |
| Pinellas Park | 2.085 | 3.355 | SR 686A to SR 686 (Roosevelt Boulevard) St. Pete–Clearwater International Airport | Westbound exit and eastbound entrance |
| St. Petersburg | 2.7 | 4.3 | Gateway Toll Gantry | |
| St. Petersburg | 2.7 | 4.3 | I-275 Express north | Left eastbound exit and westbound entrance |
| St. Petersburg | 2.8 | 4.5 | CR 296 (118th Avenue North) | Westbound exit and eastbound entrance; no toll |
| St. Petersburg | 3.2 | 5.1 | I-275 – Tampa, St. Petersburg | I-275 exit 30 |
1.000 mi = 1.609 km; 1.000 km = 0.621 mi: Electronic toll collection; Incomplete access

=== State Road 686A ===
The entire route is in Pinellas County.

| Location | mi | km | Destinations | Notes |
|---|---|---|---|---|
| Largo | 0.000 | 0.000 | CR 611 / Bayside Bridge – Clearwater | Western terminus for eastbound lanes |
| Largo–Feather Sound line | 0.75 | 1.21 | SR 686 (Roosevelt Boulevard) – Largo | Western terminus for westbound lanes |
| Feather Sound | 1.5 | 2.4 | St. Pete–Clearwater International Airport | Westbound exit and eastbound entrance |
| Pinellas Park–Feather Sound– South Highpoint tripoint | 2.0 | 3.2 | SR 688 (Ulmerton Road) – Indian Rocks Beach | No eastbound exit; tolled westbound entrance |
| Pinellas Park | 2.8 | 4.5 | SR 690 east – Tampa, St. Petersburg | Entrance from SR 690 west only |
1.000 mi = 1.609 km; 1.000 km = 0.621 mi: Incomplete access
