= Walter Livingston (coach) =

American football, basketball, and track coach (1884–1970)

Biographical details
- Born: November 19, 1884; Piqua, Ohio, U.S.
- Died: December 3, 1970 (aged 86); Indian Rocks Beach, Florida, U.S.

Playing career

Football
- 1906–1909: Denison
- Positions: Fullback, tackle

Coaching career (HC unless noted)

Football
- 1911–1926: Denison

Basketball
- 1911–1936: Denison

Administrative career (AD unless noted)
- 1911–1952: Denison

Head coaching record
- Overall: 76–44–12 (football); 226–132 (basketball)

Accomplishments and honors

Championships
- Football; 1 OAC (1914)

Walter James "Livy" Livingston (November 19, 1884 – December 3, 1970) was an American football, basketball, and track coach and college athletics administrator. He served as the head football coach at Denison University from 1911 to 1926, compiling a record of 76–44–12. Livingston was also the head basketball coach at Denison from 1911 to 1936, tallying a mark of 226–132. He was the athletic director at Denison from 1911 to 1952.

== Head coaching record ==
=== Football ===
Year	Team	Overall	Conference	Standing	Bowl/playoffs
Denison Big Red (Ohio Athletic Conference) (1911–1925)
1911	Denison	6–2–2	3–2–2	6th	
1912	Denison	6–1–1	4–1–1	4th	
1913	Denison	5–2	4–1	3rd	
1914	Denison	7–1	5–1	1st	
1915	Denison	6–2	5–2	3rd	
1916	Denison	5–1–2	5–0–2	T–2nd	
1917	Denison	5–3	2–2	T–6th	
1918	Denison	1–6	0–5	T–14th	
1919	Denison	6–2–1	4–2–1	7th	
1920	Denison	6–1–1	5–1–1	4th	
1921	Denison	5–3	5–2	6th	
1922	Denison	6–3	4–3	T–9th	
1923	Denison	3–3–2	2–2–2	T–8th	
1924	Denison	3–4–1	3–4	13th	
1925	Denison	4–4–1	3–4	T–12th	
Denison Big Red (Ohio Athletic Conference / Buckeye Athletic Association) (1926)
1926	Denison	2–6–1	2–6 / 1–3	17th / 5th	
Denison:		76–44–12	56–38–9		
Total:		76–44–12			
