= Sand Key =

Sand Key may refer to:

- Sand Key (barrier island), in Pinellas County, Florida, US
  - Sand Key Park
- Sand Key (reef), a coral reef in the Key West National Wildlife Refuge, Monroe County, Florida, US
  - Sand Key Light
- Sand Key, a previous name for Hospital Key in Dry Tortugas National Park
