= Sand Key (barrier island) =

Island on Florida's Gulf coast

Coordinates: 27°57′31″N 82°49′36″W

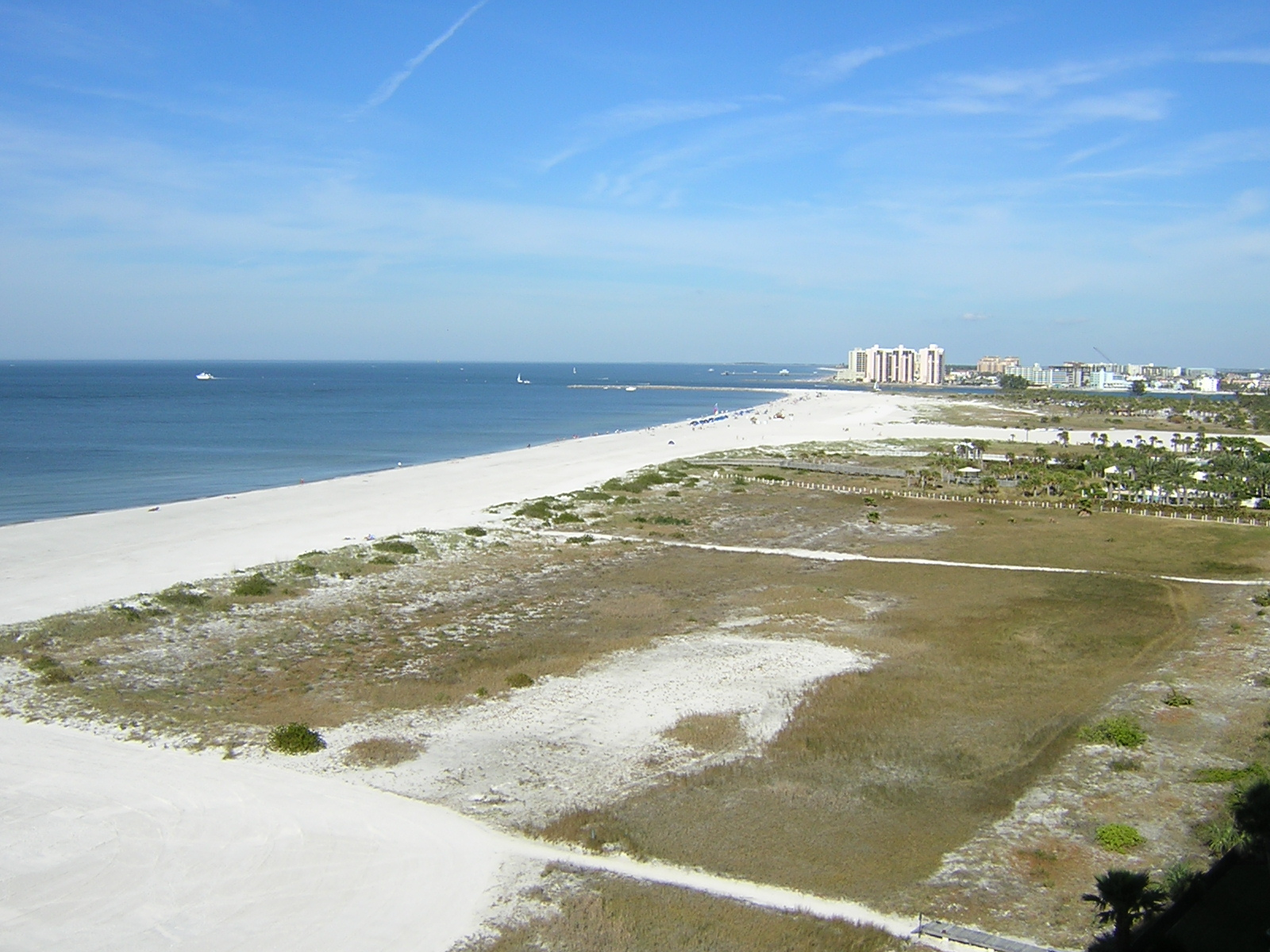
View North from Sand Key toward Clearwater Beach, Florida (2006)

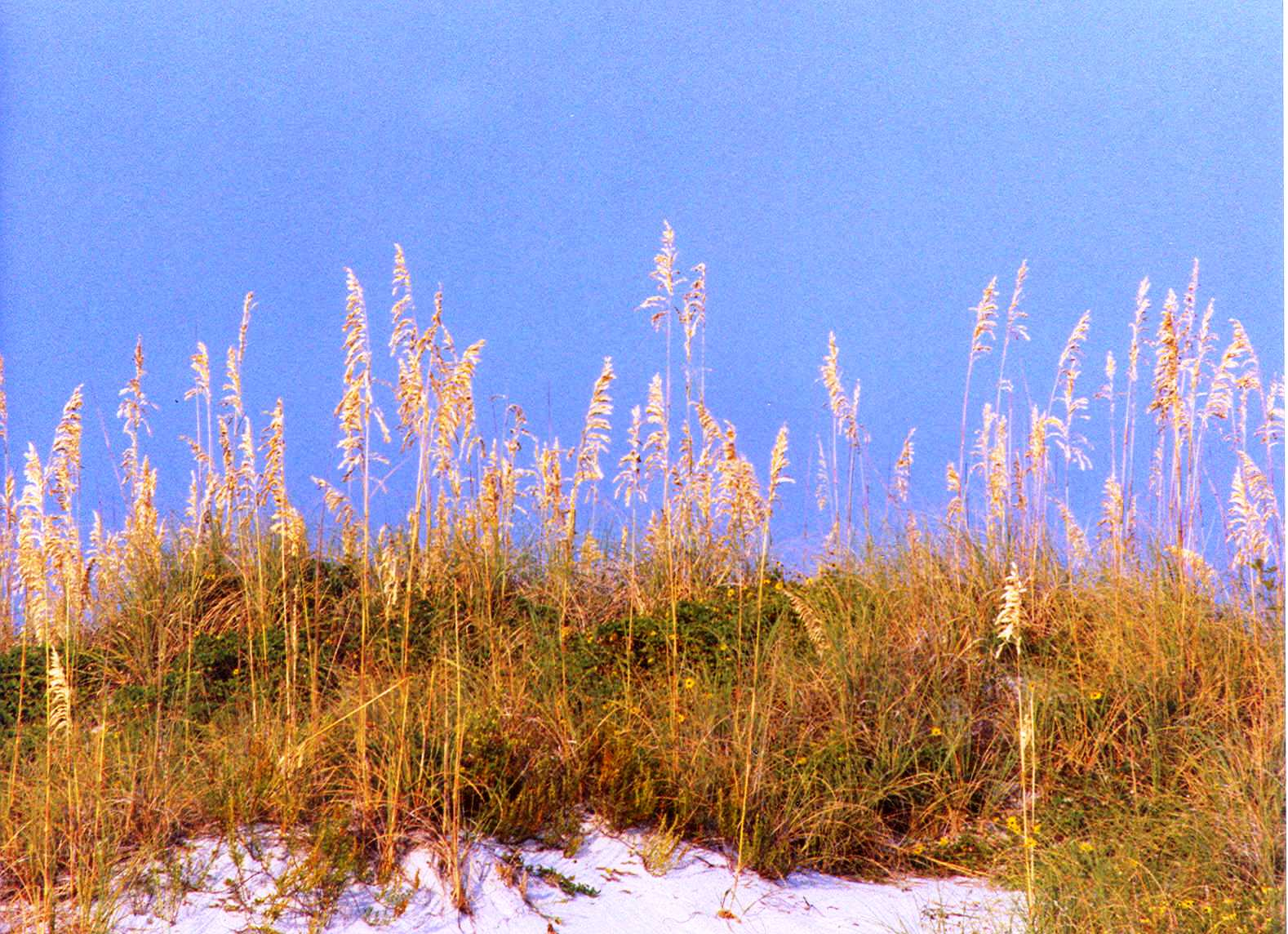
Sea oats at Sand Key Park

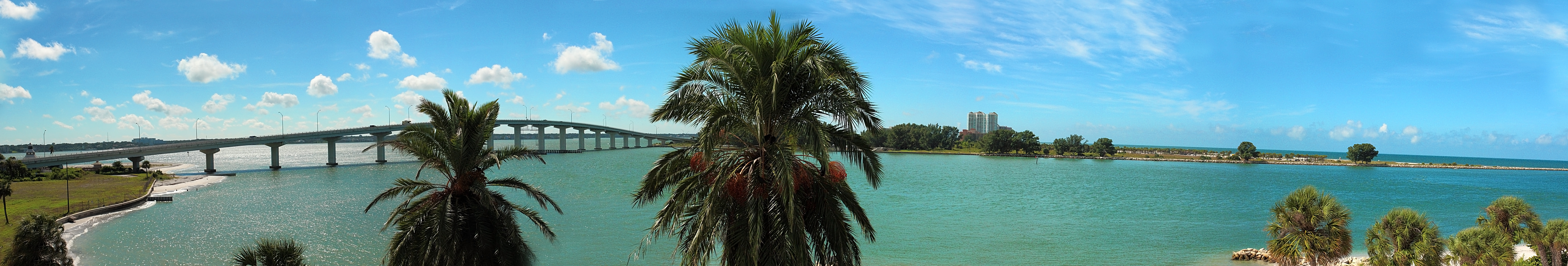
Panorama view of Sand Key Park and County Road 183 from Clearwater

Sand Key is a barrier island on Florida's Gulf Coast that stretches from Madeira Beach through Redington Beach, North Redington Beach, Redington Shores, Indian Shores, Indian Rocks Beach, Belleair Shore, and Belleair Beach into Clearwater.

The Clearwater portion of the island includes Sand Key Park (a Pinellas County park south of Clearwater Beach). It closes at dark, has picnic and fishing accommodations, a nature trail, beach concession stands, and very spacious parking lots. By contrast, the main part of Clearwater Beach is so densely developed that it can be difficult to navigate by car. In 2012, the parking meters in Sand Key Park, under the jurisdiction of the county government, were removed in favor of a flat daily rate system ($5). These two islands as well as the island containing the Island Estates neighborhood belong to the city of Clearwater, whose downtown core a.k.a. "Cleveland Street District" lies a couple of miles to the east over the Clearwater Memorial Causeway.
