= William Dean Chocolates =

Chocolatier in Florida, United States

Coordinates: 27.916280°N 82.817661°W

- Industry: Artisan Chocolate Makers
- Founded: 2007
- Founder: Bill Brown
- Headquarters: Pinellas County, Florida, United States
- Products: chocolate truffles, lemongrass truffles, coconut truffles, more
- Owner: Bill Brown
- Website: www.williamdeanchocolates.com

William Dean Chocolates is an artisan chocolate maker in the Belleair Bluffs section of Largo in Pinellas County, Florida. Their chocolate truffles are hand-painted in delicate designs including the marble swirl of purple, bronze and red on the PB&J, a purple dotted port wine with fig, and a lavender truffle in a butterfly shape. The business is owned by chocolatier Bill Brown who founded it in 2007. It is named for his father (William) and grandfather (Dean). Valrhona chocolate is used as well as authentic ingredients, some exotic.

The Tampa Bay Times called it "a rising star in the world of hand-crafted chocolates" that has won more than 60 national awards including best in show at the New York Chocolate Show and 11 gold medals at the San Francisco International Chocolate Salon. Whoopi Goldberg is a fan and helped publicize the startup.

William Dean Chocolates' coconut and lemongrass truffles are pictured in a scene of The Hunger Games.
