= Highpoint, Florida =

Highpoint
- Unincorporated community
- Location within the state of Florida
- Coordinates: 27°55′01″N 82°42′46″W
- Country: United States
- State: Florida
- County: Pinellas
- Elevation: 13 ft (4.0 m)
- Time zone: UTC-5 (Eastern (EST))
  - Summer (DST): UTC-4 (EDT)
- GNIS feature ID: 1867154

Highpoint is an unincorporated community in eastern Pinellas County, Florida, United States, near Tampa Bay. It is situated between Feather Sound and Largo. The area includes the census-designated place of South Highpoint.

== Geography ==
Highpoint is located at 27.91667 degrees north, 82.71306 degrees west (27.91667, -82.71306). The elevation for the community is 13 feet above sea level.

== Education ==
The community of Highpoint is served by Pinellas County Schools.
