= Tiki Gardens =

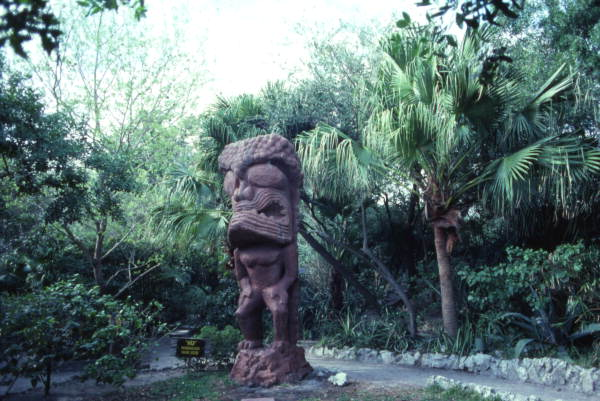
- Kū, the Hawaiian war god, at Tiki Gardens in 1982
- Interactive map of Tiki Gardens
- Location: Indian Shores, Florida, United States
- Coordinates: 27°51′15.1″N 82°50′43.2″W
- Status: Defunct
- Opened: 1964
- Closed: 1980s
- Owner: Frank and Wahine Jo Byars

Tiki Gardens was a South Seas Polynesian theme park in Indian Shores, Florida. The park, which opened in 1964, was closed in the 1980s and sold by the owners, "Trader" Frank Byars and Wahine Jo Byars, to a developer who planned to build a hotel on the large property. Pinellas County, Florida bought the property from the developer and turned it into a public beach access parking lot.

The LP Exotic Sounds from Tiki Gardens features "Polynesian Fantasy...the Tiki Gardens Theme Song", which was written by Ernie Shreeves, one of the "men behind Tiki Gardens".
