= Indian Shores, Florida =

- Town
- Town of Indian Shores
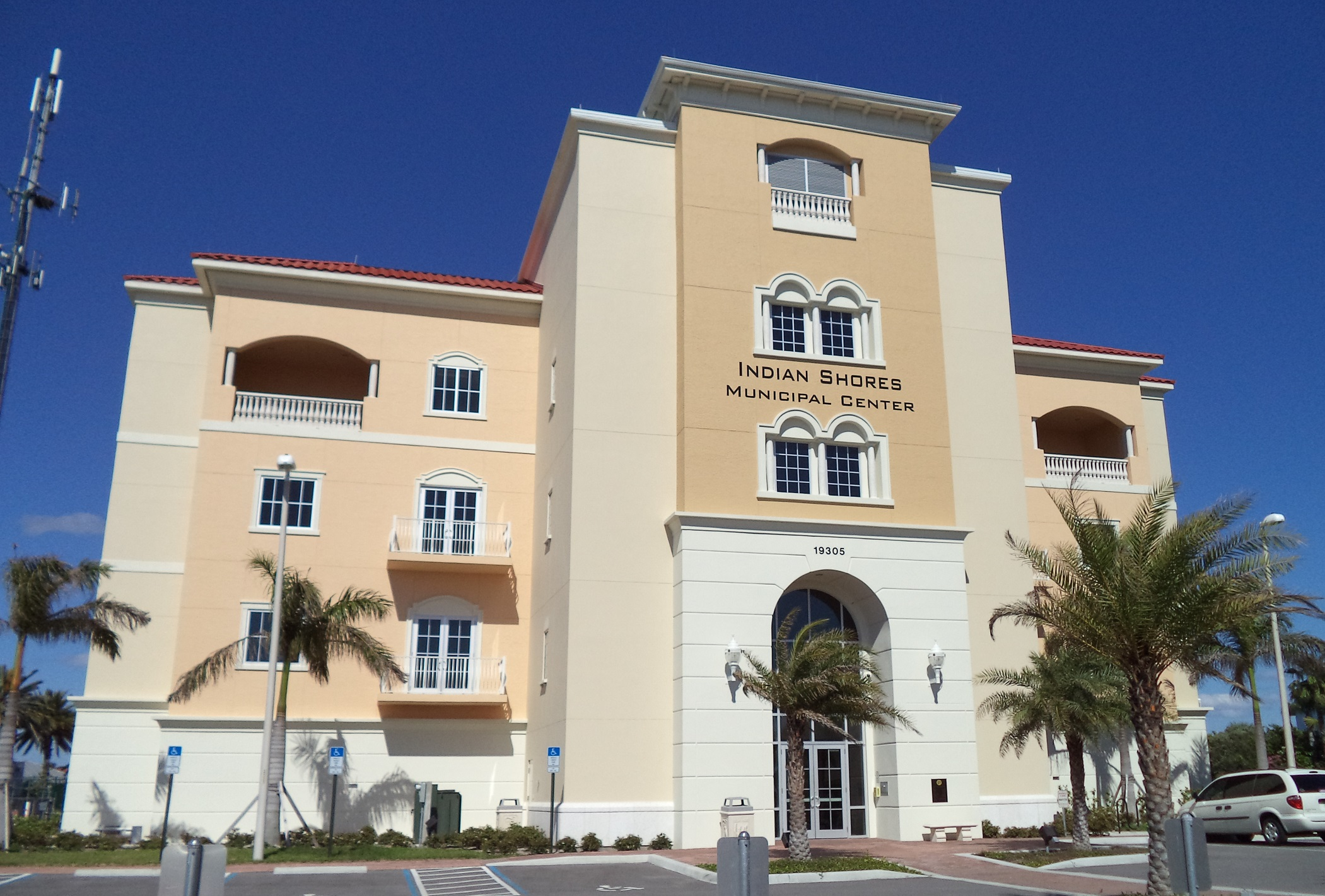
- Indian Shores Municipal Center on May 6, 2013

- Seal
- Motto: "A Great Place To Live "
- Location of Indian Shores in Pinellas County, Florida
- Coordinates: 27°51′12″N 82°50′43″W
- Country: United States
- State: Florida
- County: Pinellas
- Settled (Indian Rocks Beach South Shore): 1883
- Incorporated (Town of Indian Rocks Beach South Shore): September 16, 1949
- Incorporated (Town of Indian Shores): August 14, 1973

Government
  - Type: Mayor-Council
  - Mayor: Diantha Schear
  - Vice Mayor: Ellen A. Bauer
  - Councilors: Michael P. Howard, Mark Housman, and Nicholas J. Menchise
  - Town Administrator: Christina "Tina" Porter
  - Town Clerk: Freddie Lozano

Area
  - Total: 0.97 sq mi (2.50 km^{2})
  - Land: 0.33 sq mi (0.86 km^{2})
  - Water: 0.63 sq mi (1.64 km^{2})
- Elevation: 7 ft (2.1 m)

Population (2020)
  - Total: 1,190
  - Density: 3,564.8/sq mi (1,376.37/km^{2})
- Time zone: UTC-5 (Eastern (EST))
  - Summer (DST): UTC-4 (EDT)
- ZIP code: 33785
- Area code: 727
- FIPS code: 12-33675
- GNIS feature ID: 2405886
- Website: www.myindianshores.com

Indian Shores is a town in Pinellas County, Florida, United States. It is part of the Tampa–St. Petersburg–Clearwater Metropolitan Statistical Area, more commonly known as the Tampa Bay Area. The population was 1,190 at the 2020 census.

== Geography ==
The approximate coordinates for the Town of Indian Shores is located at 27°51′2″N 82°50′36″W (27.850668, –82.843407).

Indian Shores is bordered by the beach communities of Indian Rocks Beach to the north and Redington Shores to the south.

The town is a beachfront community situated on a barrier island west of Seminole.

According to the United States Census Bureau, the town has a total area of 0.9 square miles (2.3 km^{2}), of which 0.3 square miles (0.78 km^{2}) is land and 0.6 square miles (1.6 km^{2}) (64.21%) is water.

== Climate ==
The climate in this area is characterized by hot, humid summers and generally mild winters. According to the Köppen climate classification, the Town of Indian Shores has a humid subtropical climate zone (Cfa).

== Demographics ==
Historical population
Census	Pop.	Note	%±
1950	198		—
1960	296		49.5%
1970	791		167.2%
1980	984		24.4%
1990	1,405		42.8%
2000	1,705		21.4%
2010	1,420		−16.7%
2020	1,190		−16.2%
U.S. Decennial Census

=== Racial and ethnic composition ===
Indian Shores racial composition (Hispanics excluded from racial categories) (NH = Non-Hispanic)
Race	Pop 2010	Pop 2020	% 2010	% 2020
White (NH)	1,302	1,056	91.69%	88.74%
Black or African American (NH)	6	5	0.42%	0.42%
Native American or Alaska Native (NH)	0	0	0.00%	0.00%
Asian (NH)	17	33	1.20%	2.77%
Pacific Islander or Native Hawaiian (NH)	2	0	0.14%	0.00%
Some other race (NH)	3	4	0.21%	0.34%
Two or more races/Multiracial (NH)	5	17	0.35%	1.43%
Hispanic or Latino (any race)	85	75	5.99%	6.30%
Total	1,420	1,190	100.00%	100.00%

=== 2020 census ===
As of the 2020 census, Indian Shores had a population of 1,190. The median age was 63.7 years. 6.1% of residents were under the age of 18 and 47.0% of residents were 65 years of age or older. For every 100 females there were 86.2 males, and for every 100 females age 18 and over there were 87.9 males age 18 and over.

100.0% of residents lived in urban areas, while 0.0% lived in rural areas.

There were 653 households in Indian Shores, of which 8.7% had children under the age of 18 living in them. Of all households, 52.8% were married-couple households, 15.6% were households with a male householder and no spouse or partner present, and 26.6% were households with a female householder and no spouse or partner present. About 35.0% of all households were made up of individuals and 20.2% had someone living alone who was 65 years of age or older.

There were 2,535 housing units, of which 74.2% were vacant. The homeowner vacancy rate was 3.5% and the rental vacancy rate was 57.4%.

According to the 2020 American Community Survey 5-year estimates, there were 634 households and 413 families residing in the town.

=== 2010 census ===
As of the 2010 United States census, there were 1,420 people, 791 households, and 464 families residing in the town.

=== 2000 census ===
As of the census of 2000, there were 1,705 people, 989 households, and 483 families residing in the town. The population density was 5,097.7 inhabitants per square mile (1,968.2/km^{2}). There were 2,547 housing units at an average density of 7,615.2 per square mile (2,940.2/km^{2}). The racial makeup of the town was 98.36% White, 0.23% African American, 0.06% Native American, 0.41% Asian, 0.06% Pacific Islander, 0.12% from other races, and 0.76% from two or more races. Hispanic or Latino of any race were 3.46% of the population.

In 2000, there were 989 households, out of which 5.8% had children under the age of 18 living with them, 41.1% were married couples living together, 5.2% had a female householder with no husband present, and 51.1% were non-families. 42.8% of all households were made up of individuals, and 17.7% had someone living alone who was 65 years of age or older. The average household size was 1.72 and the average family size was 2.26.

In 2000, in the town, the population was spread out, with 6.1% under the age of 18, 2.6% from 18 to 24, 19.2% from 25 to 44, 40.0% from 45 to 64, and 32.1% who were 65 years of age or older. The median age was 56 years. For every 100 females, there were 96.4 males. For every 100 females age 18 and over, there were 93.6 males.

In 2000, the median income for a household in the town was $45,000, and the median income for a family was $61,641. Males had a median income of $45,375 versus $35,875 for females. The per capita income for the town was $40,002. About 5.4% of families and 6.9% of the population were below the poverty line, including 9.3% of those under age 18 and 9.8% of those age 65 or over.

== Facilities and services ==
The town has undergone multiple construction and renovation projects, including utility under-grounding, road re-surfacing, and the placement of pedestrian safety measures. The town staff recently moved into a new municipal center which replaces the decades-old, antiquated facility. The new building houses all Town Departments, and a Council Chambers for official meetings. The fourth floor of the building has a large banquet hall, with waterfront balcony views on both sides.

Indian Shores also maintains a municipal police department, staffed and operational 24 hours per day, 365 days a year. The ISPD occupies a new modernized operations facility in the Municipal Center. The Police Department also provides services to the neighboring town of Redington Shores. Services are provided through traditional vehicle patrol, as well as ATV patrol on the sand beach areas. In addition to uniformed services, the department has a Criminal Investigation Division. Created in 1964, the Police Department is currently headed by Chief Richard (Rick) Swann.

== See also ==
- Tiki Gardens
