= South Highpoint, Florida =

- Census-designated place
- Location in Pinellas County and the state of Florida
- Coordinates: 27°54′40″N 82°42′53″W
- Country: United States
- State: Florida
- County: Pinellas

Area
  - Total: 0.85 sq mi (2.21 km^{2})
  - Land: 0.85 sq mi (2.20 km^{2})
  - Water: 0.0039 sq mi (0.01 km^{2})
- Elevation: 16 ft (4.9 m)

Population (2020)
  - Total: 5,018
  - Density: 5,909.0/sq mi (2,281.47/km^{2})
- Time zone: UTC-5 (Eastern (EST))
  - Summer (DST): UTC-4 (EDT)
- ZIP Code: 33760
- Area code: 727
- FIPS code: 12-67462
- GNIS feature ID: 2402873

South Highpoint is a census-designated place (CDP) in Pinellas County, Florida, United States. As of the 2020 census, South Highpoint had a population of 5,018.

== Geography ==
South Highpoint is located within the unincorporated community of Highpoint, it is adjacent to the city of Largo.

According to the United States Census Bureau, the CDP has a total area of 1.0 square mile (2.6 km^{2}), all land.

== Demographics ==
Historical population
Census	Pop.	Note	%±
2000	8,839		—
2010	5,195		−41.2%
2020	5,018		−3.4%

=== 2020 census ===
As of the 2020 census, South Highpoint had a population of 5,018. The median age was 33.8 years. 28.1% of residents were under the age of 18 and 9.7% of residents were 65 years of age or older. For every 100 females there were 104.0 males, and for every 100 females age 18 and over there were 100.6 males age 18 and over.

100.0% of residents lived in urban areas, while 0.0% lived in rural areas.

There were 1,779 households in South Highpoint, of which 37.2% had children under the age of 18 living in them. Of all households, 33.5% were married-couple households, 24.4% were households with a male householder and no spouse or partner present, and 30.9% were households with a female householder and no spouse or partner present. About 25.4% of all households were made up of individuals and 8.1% had someone living alone who was 65 years of age or older.

There were 1,905 housing units, of which 6.6% were vacant. The homeowner vacancy rate was 2.4% and the rental vacancy rate was 6.7%.

Racial composition as of the 2020 census
Race	Number	Percent
White	2,319	46.2%
Black or African American	632	12.6%
American Indian and Alaska Native	54	1.1%
Asian	295	5.9%
Native Hawaiian and Other Pacific Islander	16	0.3%
Some other race	999	19.9%
Two or more races	703	14.0%
Hispanic or Latino (of any race)	1,806	36.0%

=== 2000 census ===
As of the census of 2000, there were 8,839 people, 2,136 households, and 1,386 families residing in the CDP. The population density was 1,565.5/km^{2} (4,062.9/mi^{2}). There were 2,354 housing units at an average density of 416.9/km^{2} (1,082.0/mi^{2}). The racial makeup of the CDP was 67.96% White, 23.25% African American, 0.43% Native American, 3.62% Asian, 0.07% Pacific Islander, 2.92% from other races, and 1.75% from two or more races. Hispanic or Latino of any race were 9.27% of the population.

There were 2,136 households, out of which 37.1% had children under the age of 18 living with them, 38.7% were married couples living together, 19.9% had a female householder with no husband present, and 35.1% were non-families. 24.7% of all households were made up of individuals, and 4.4% had someone living alone who was 65 years of age or older. The average household size was 2.64 and the average family size was 3.13.

In the CDP, the population was spread out, with 20.9% under the age of 18, 13.5% from 18 to 24, 43.9% from 25 to 44, 17.2% from 45 to 64, and 4.4% who were 65 years of age or older. The median age was 32 years. For every 100 females, there were 165.1 males. For every 100 females age 18 and over, there were 181.4 males.

The median income for a household in the CDP was $29,440, and the median income for a family was $30,136. Males had a median income of $25,000 versus $21,230 for females. The per capita income for the CDP was $9,519. About 21.4% of families and 22.2% of the population were below the poverty line, including 34.5% of those under age 18 and 21.1% of those age 65 or over.
