= Bayside Bridge =

Bridge in United States of America

Pinellas County Bayside Bridge
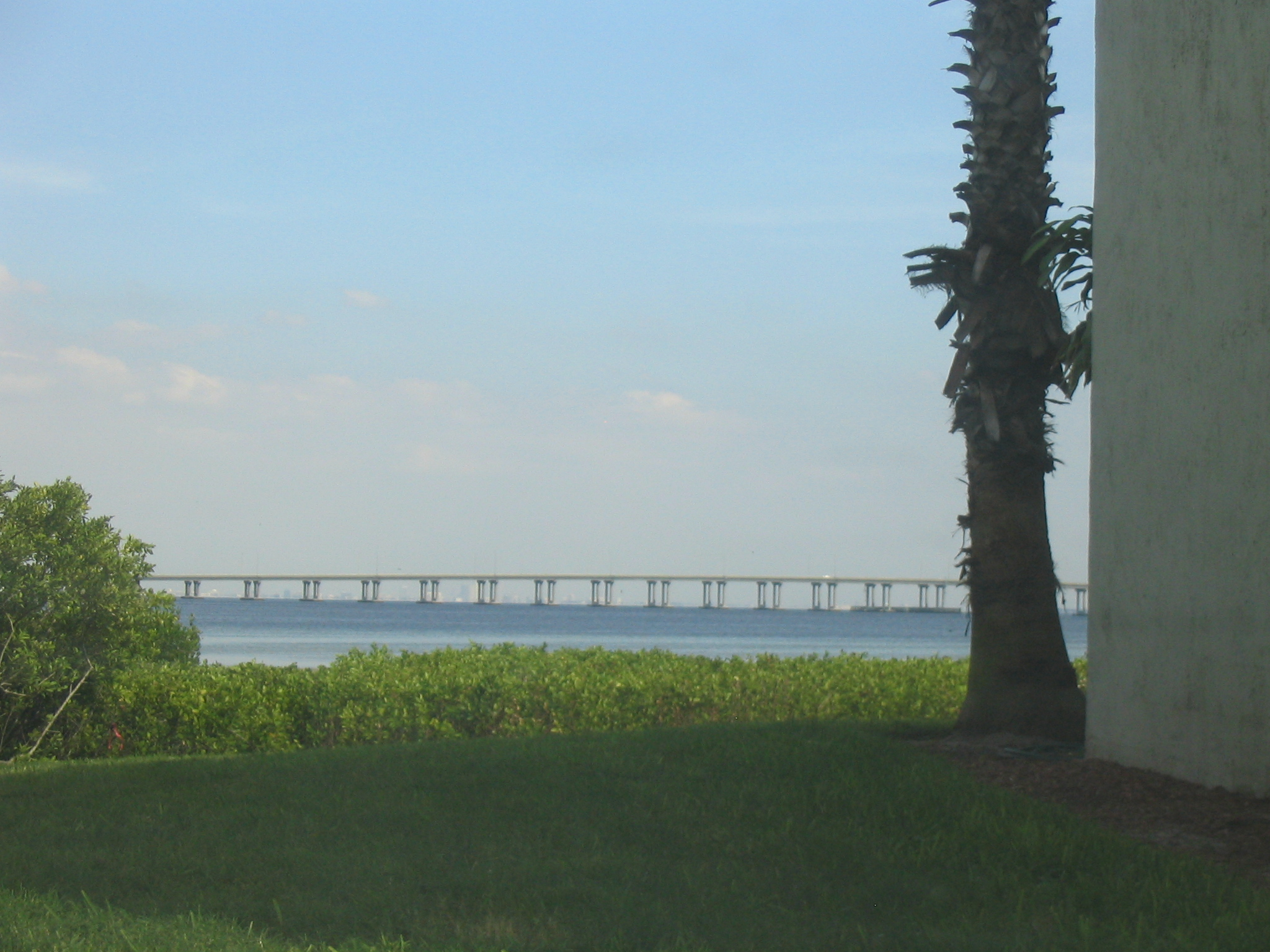
- Coordinates: 27.9463791°N 82.7053356°W
- Carries: CR 611 (49th Street North)
- Crosses: Old Tampa Bay
- Locale: Clearwater, FL to Largo, FL
- Official name: Dillinger McCabe Bayside Bridge

History
- Opened: June 2, 1993

Statistics
- Daily traffic: 68,807

Location
- Interactive map of Pinellas County Bayside Bridge

The Bayside Bridge (officially known as the Dillinger McCabe Bayside Bridge) is a girder bridge in Pinellas County which crosses over the northwesternmost end of Tampa Bay, connecting Clearwater, Florida and Largo, Florida. Construction began in the early 1990s and was completed in the summer of 1993, officially opening for traffic on June 2 of that year. Originally conceived in the 1970s as the 49th Street Bridge, a toll-levied part of the 12-mile (19 km) Pinellas Parkway, the current six-lane twin-span bridge provides direct, unmitigated access from eastern Clearwater to St. Petersburg/Clearwater International Airport by connecting McMullen Booth Road to 49th Street North and also serves as a bypass for heavily congested US 19.

The speed limit is 55 mph (or about 88 km/h) until McMullen Booth. Due to cambering differences, cars experience bouncing when traveling in the northbound lanes. This occurs for the first (southern) half of the northbound span.

It features a SPUI interchange at State Road 60 and a diamond interchange on the south end of the bridge. Along with the bridge, a $12 million interchange was built at the intersection of 49th Street and Roosevelt Boulevard. The bridge was completed before McMullen Booth Road was widened, dumping up to 36,000 cars a day onto the two-lane road. On streets such as Marlo Road, drivers could wait as long as 15 minutes before being able to make a left turn.

In 1991, Pinellas County administrator Fred Marquis argued that the cost of the bridge could be funded by a 10-year extension of gasoline taxes. The plan went through as the "Penny for Pinellas" tax. This eliminated the need for a planned $2.5 million, 16-lane toll booth that would have been built on sensitive marshlands at the south end of the bridge. The cost of construction of the bridge is estimated at $71 million.

The Bayside Bridge connects to nearby Interstate 275 via the Gateway Expressway that opened in May 2024.

In January 2026, the Pinellas County Board of County Commissioners voted to approve an action to rename the bridge after prominent county public defender Bob Dillinger and long-time state attorney Bernie McCabe. The bridge became officially known as the Dillinger McCabe Bayside Bridge effective February 24, 2026.
