= Belleair Shore, Florida =

- Town
- Seal

- Location in Pinellas County and the state of Florida
- Coordinates: 27°55′02″N 82°50′48″W
- Country: United States
- State: Florida
- County: Pinellas
- Founded: 1946
- Incorporated: 1955

Government
  - Type: Mayor-Commission
  - Mayor: Steve Blume
  - Vice Mayor: Daniel Storie
  - Commissioners: Michael Tolbert, Susan Cain, and Robin Lally
  - Town Clerk: Mary F. Palmer
  - Town Attorney: Daniel P. Lewis

Area
  - Total: 0.23 sq mi (0.59 km^{2})
  - Land: 0.058 sq mi (0.15 km^{2})
  - Water: 0.17 sq mi (0.43 km^{2})
- Elevation: 0 ft (0 m)

Population (2020)
  - Total: 73
  - Density: 1,227.5/sq mi (473.94/km^{2})
- Time zone: UTC-5 (Eastern (EST))
  - Summer (DST): UTC-4 (EDT)
- ZIP code: 33786
- Area code: 727
- FIPS code: 12-05150
- GNIS feature ID: 2405235
- Website: belleairshore.com

Belleair Shore is a town in Pinellas County, Florida, United States. The Town of Belleair Shore is part of the Tampa–St. Petersburg–Clearwater Metropolitan Statistical Area, more commonly known as the Tampa Bay area. It was officially established and incorporated as a municipality in 1955. As of the 2020 census, it had a population of 73.

== Geography ==
The Town of Belleair Shore is located along the Gulf of Mexico.

According to the United States Census Bureau, the town has a total area of 0.5 square miles (1.3 km^{2}), of which 0.1 square miles (0.26 km^{2}) is land and 0.4 square miles (1.0 km^{2}) is water.

One of Florida's smallest incorporated towns, Belleair Shore is located entirely on the west side of Gulf Boulevard, bounded by the Gulf to the west, Belleair Beach to the north and east, and Indian Rocks Beach to the south.

== Climate ==
The climate in this area is characterized by hot, humid summers and generally mild winters. According to the Köppen climate classification, the Town of Belleair Shore has a humid subtropical climate zone (Cfa).

== Demographics ==
Historical population
Census	Pop.	Note	%±
1960	61		—
1970	124		103.3%
1980	80		−35.5%
1990	60		−25.0%
2000	0		−100.0%
2010	109		—
2020	73		−33.0%
U.S. Decennial Census

=== 2010 and 2020 census ===
Belleair Shore racial composition (Hispanics excluded from racial categories) (NH = Non-Hispanic)
Race	Pop 2010	Pop 2020	% 2010	% 2020
White (NH)	88	68	80.73%	93.15%
Black or African American (NH)	1	0	0.92%	0.00%
Native American or Alaska Native (NH)	0	0	0.00%	0.00%
Asian (NH)	2	0	1.83%	0.00%
Pacific Islander or Native Hawaiian (NH)	0	0	0.00%	0.00%
Some other race (NH)	0	0	0.00%	0.00%
Two or more races/Multiracial (NH)	13	5	11.93%	6.85%
Hispanic or Latino (any race)	5	0	4.59%	0.00%
Total	109	73	100.00%	100.00%

As of the 2020 United States census, there were 73 people, 42 households, and 35 families residing in the town.

As of the 2010 United States census, there were 109 people, 29 households, and 21 families residing in the town.

=== 2000 census ===
According to the 2000 census, the population was zero.
