= Indian Rocks Beach, Florida =

- City
- City of Indian Rocks Beach
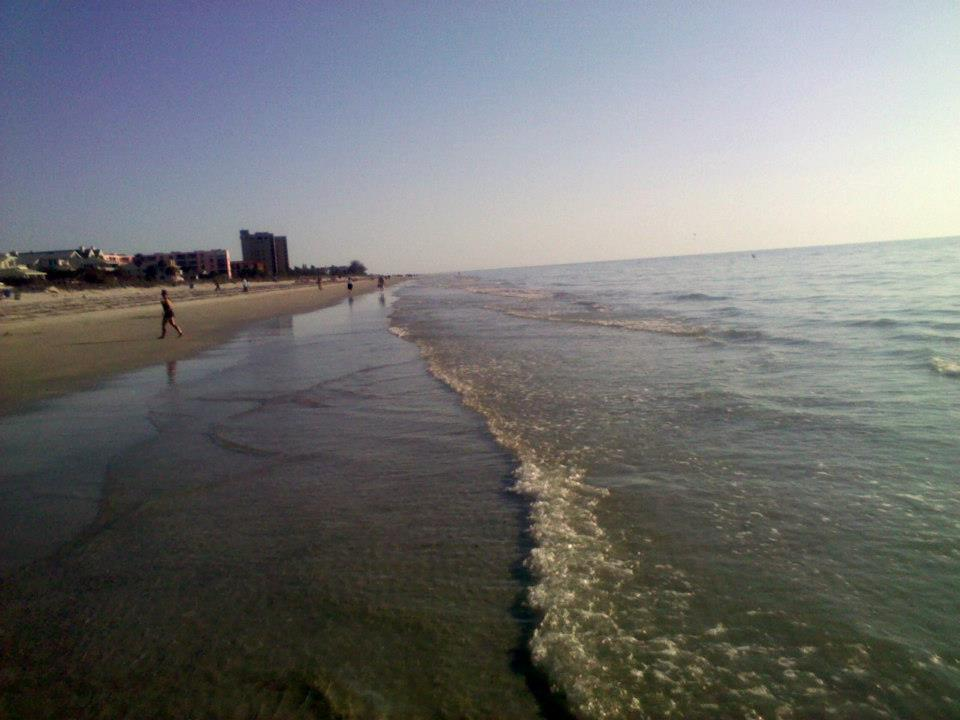
- Indian Rocks Beach in March 2013

- Seal
- Nickname: IRB
- Motto: World's Safest Beach
- Location in Pinellas County and the state of Florida
- Coordinates: 27°52′48″N 82°50′55″W
- Country: United States
- State: Florida
- County: Pinellas
- Settled: 1883–1890
- Incorporated: 1925
- Disincorporated: May 26, 1927
- Reincorporated: June 25, 1955

Government
  - Type: Commission-Manager
  - Mayor: Lan Vaughan
  - Vice Mayor: Janet Wilson
  - Commissioners: Kellee Watt, Hilary King, and John Bigelow
  - City Manager: Ryan Henderson
  - City Clerk: Lorin A. Kornijtschuk

Area
  - Total: 1.89 sq mi (4.90 km^{2})
  - Land: 0.85 sq mi (2.19 km^{2})
  - Water: 1.05 sq mi (2.71 km^{2})
- Elevation: 3 ft (0.91 m)

Population (2020)
  - Total: 3,673
  - Density: 4,348/sq mi (1,678.8/km^{2})
- Time zone: UTC-5 (Eastern (EST))
  - Summer (DST): UTC-4 (EDT)
- ZIP codes: 33785-33786
- Area code: 727
- FIPS code: 12-33625
- GNIS feature ID: 2404758
- Website: www.indian-rocks-beach.com

Indian Rocks Beach, or IRB, is a city in Pinellas County, Florida, United States. Indian Rocks Beach is part of the Tampa-St. Petersburg-Clearwater, FL Metropolitan Statistical Area. Located on the barrier island Sand Key, it has over two miles of beach along the Gulf of Mexico, with 26 public beach accesses. Tourism is its primary industry. The Town of Indian Rocks Beach was incorporated on June 25, 1955. The population was 3,673 at the 2020 census.

== Geography ==
Indian Rocks Beach lies on a barrier island between the Gulf of Mexico and the Intracoastal Waterway. It is north of Indian Shores and south of Belleair Shore and Belleair Beach.

According to the United States Census Bureau, the city has a total area of 1.4 square miles (3.6 km^{2}), of which 0.9 square miles (2.3 km^{2}) is land and 0.5 square miles (1.3 km^{2}) (33.09%) is water.

== Demographics ==
Historical population
Census	Pop.	Note	%±
1960	1,940		—
1970	2,666		37.4%
1980	3,717		39.4%
1990	3,963		6.6%
2000	5,072		28.0%
2010	4,113		−18.9%
2020	3,673		−10.7%
U.S. Decennial Census

=== Racial and ethnic composition ===
Indian Rocks Beach racial composition (Hispanics excluded from racial categories) (NH = Non-Hispanic)
Race	Pop 2010	Pop 2020	% 2010	% 2020
White (NH)	3,771	3,255	91.68%	88.62%
Black or African American (NH)	40	28	0.97%	0.76%
Native American or Alaska Native (NH)	7	6	0.17%	0.16%
Asian (NH)	27	33	0.66%	0.90%
Pacific Islander or Native Hawaiian (NH)	0	2	0.00%	0.05%
Some other race (NH)	6	20	0.15%	0.54%
Two or more races/Multiracial (NH)	52	114	1.26%	3.10%
Hispanic or Latino (any race)	210	215	5.11%	5.85%
Total	4,113	3,673		

=== 2020 census ===
As of the 2020 census, Indian Rocks Beach had a population of 3,673. The median age was 58.0 years. 10.0% of residents were under the age of 18 and 32.2% of residents were 65 years of age or older. For every 100 females there were 91.5 males, and for every 100 females age 18 and over there were 89.6 males age 18 and over.

As of 2020, 100.0% of residents lived in urban areas, while 0.0% lived in rural areas.

In 2020, there were 1,954 households in Indian Rocks Beach, of which 13.2% had children under the age of 18 living in them. Of all households, 44.9% were married-couple households, 20.6% were households with a male householder and no spouse or partner present, and 27.3% were households with a female householder and no spouse or partner present. About 36.4% of all households were made up of individuals and 15.8% had someone living alone who was 65 years of age or older.

In 2020, there were 3,422 housing units, of which 42.9% were vacant. The homeowner vacancy rate was 1.5% and the rental vacancy rate was 18.5%.

According to 2020 American Community Survey 5-year estimates, there were 1,249 families residing in the city.

=== 2010 census ===
As of the 2010 United States census, there were 4,113 people, 2,328 households, and 1,291 families residing in the city.

=== 2000 census ===
As of the census of 2000, there were 5,072 people, 2,700 households, and 1,393 families residing in the city. The population density was 5,454.6 inhabitants per square mile (2,106.0/km^{2}). There were 4,032 housing units at an average density of 4,336.1 units per square mile (1,674.2 units/km^{2}). The racial makeup of the city was 97.18% White, 0.30% African American, 0.18% Native American, 0.61% Asian, 0.02% Pacific Islander, 0.30% from other races, and 1.42% from two or more races. Hispanic or Latino of any race were 3.17% of the population.

In 2000, there were 2,700 households, out of which 11.3% had children under the age of 18 living with them, 44.2% were married couples living together, 5.0% had a female householder with no husband present, and 48.4% were non-families. 36.7% of all households were made up of individuals, and 9.4% had someone living alone who was 65 years of age or older. The average household size was 1.88 and the average family size was 2.39.

In 2000, in the city, the population was spread out, with 10.1% under the age of 18, 4.3% from 18 to 24, 30.0% from 25 to 44, 36.9% from 45 to 64, and 18.7% who were 65 years of age or older. The median age was 48 years. For every 100 females, there were 102.8 males. For every 100 females age 18 and over, there were 102.1 males.

In 2000, the median income for a household in the city was $53,770, and the median income for a family was $65,724. Males had a median income of $41,250 versus $31,833 for females. The per capita income for the city was $40,195. About 1.3% of families and 4.7% of the population were below the poverty line, including none of those under age 18 and 3.6% of those age 65 or over.

== Locations ==
=== Parks ===
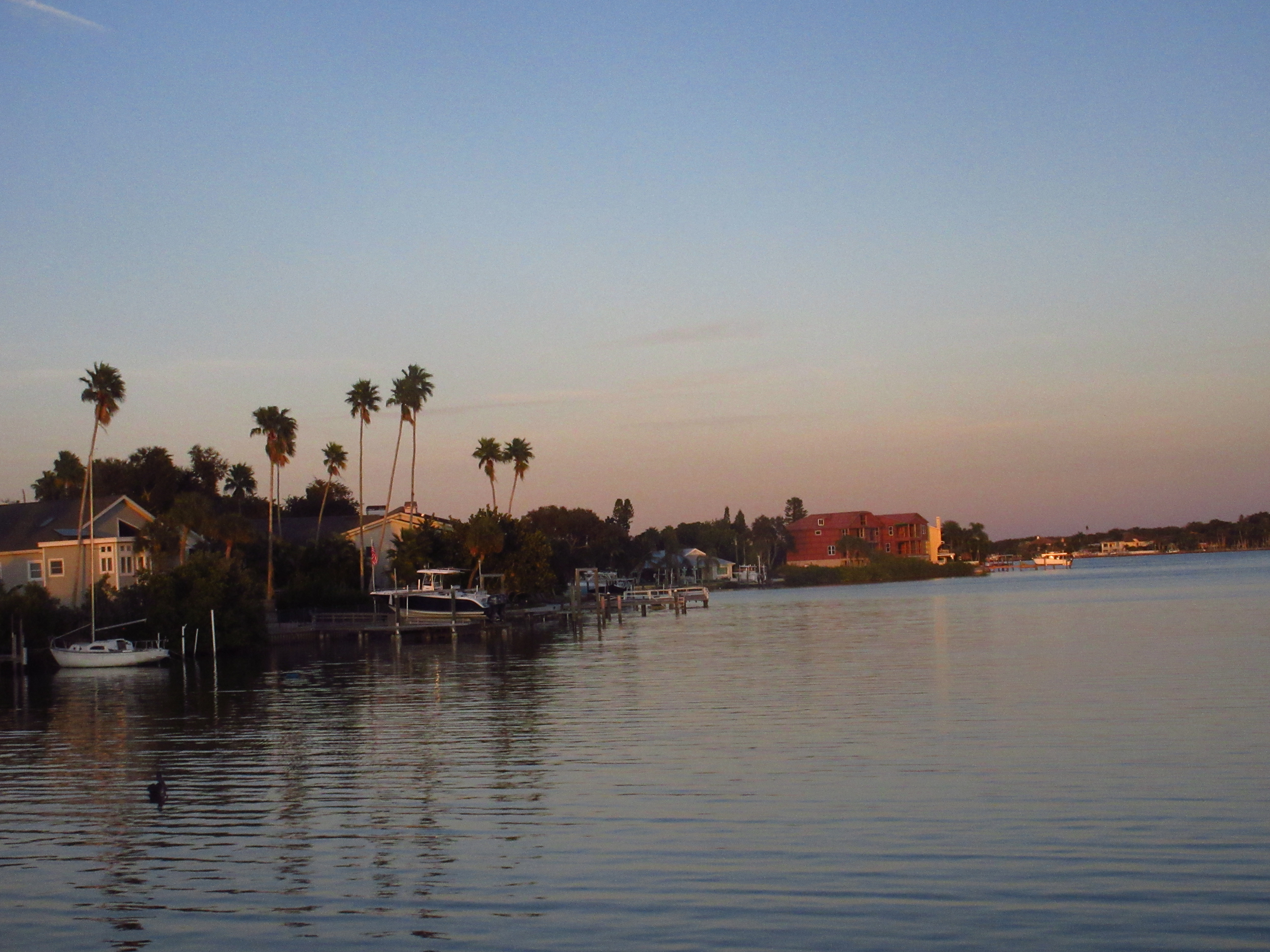
Indian Rocks Beach bayside from the Nature Preserve boardwalk

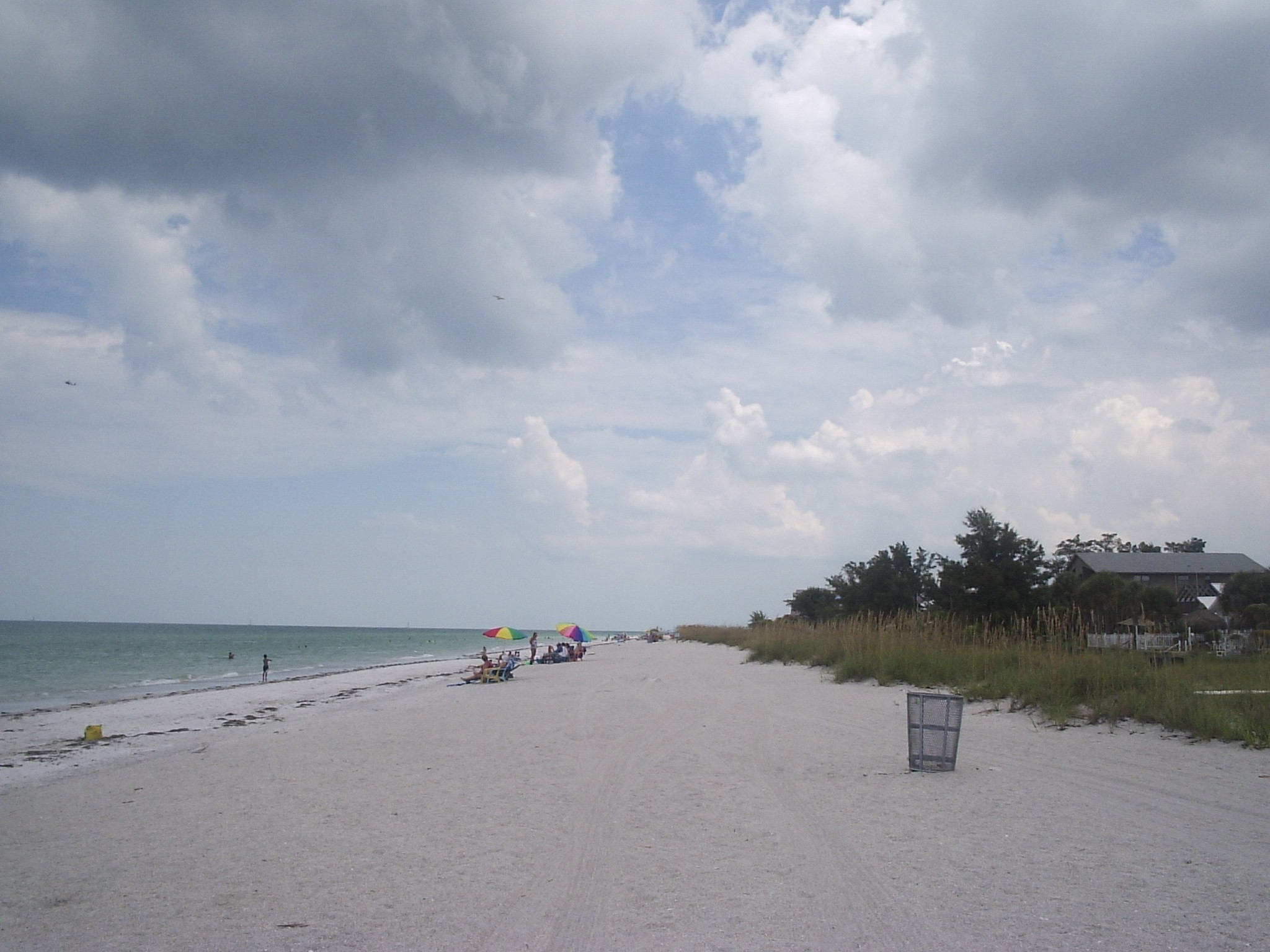
Indian Rocks Beach, unlike some Pinellas communities, offers free beach access parking.

Brown Park is on Bay Blvd, just north of 27th Ave, on very north end of Indian Rocks Beach. It has a playground and tennis courts.

Kolb Park is home to Campalong Baseball Field, Indian Rocks Beach Skatepark, tennis courts, basketball courts, and a large shaded playground area. This is where a lot of city events take place, such as Oktoberfest. The park is across the street from the city hall, between 15th Ave and 16th Ave.

Indian Rocks Beach Nature Preserve is located between 9th Ave and 10th Ave. The preserve features multiple boardwalk trails (some of which are waterfront), a dog park, and a community garden.

Chief Chic-A-Si Park is located on 4th Ave. It is home to the "Taste of IRB" event.

=== Churches ===
Church of the Isles (between 24th and 25th Ave)

Calvary Episcopal Church (between 16th and 18th Ave, waterfront)

=== Other locations ===
Indian Rocks Beach Library (between 15th and 16th Ave on Bay Palms Blvd)

Indian Rocks Beach Historical Museum is located on 4th Ave.

Indian Rocks Beach City Hall (between 15th and 16th Ave on Bay Palms Blvd)

United States Post Office (4th Ave)

Pinellas Suncoast Fire Rescue (between 3rd and 4th Ave)

== Notable people ==
- Sean Culkin, American football player
- Road Warrior Hawk, professional wrestler who retired to Indian Rocks Beach
- George Scott, professional wrestler who retired to Indian Rocks Beach
- Turner "Tfue" Tenney, YouTuber, Twitch streamer and a professional gamer
