= Feather Sound, Florida =

- Census-designated place
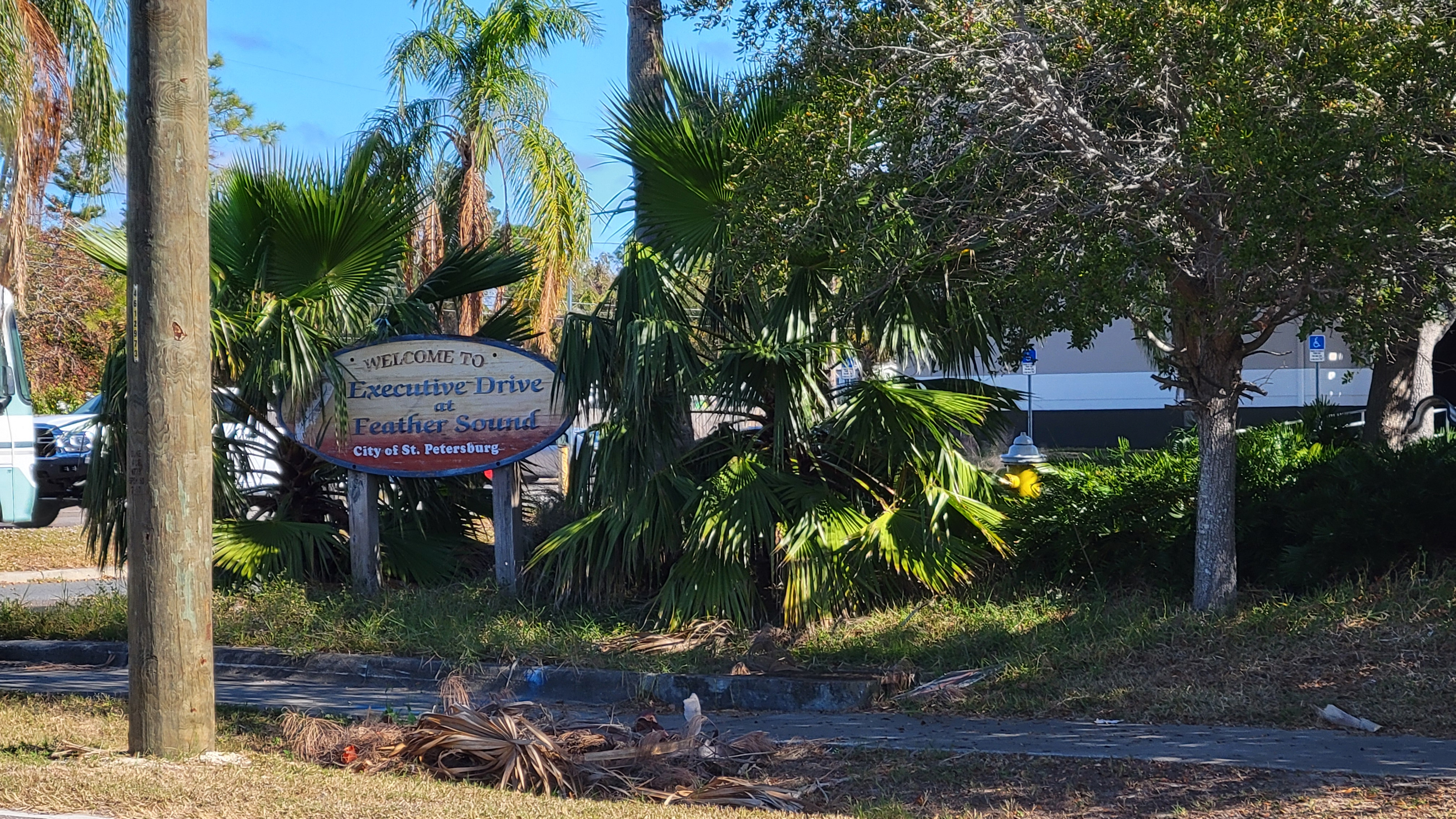
- Feather Sound neighborhood near St. Pete–Clearwater International Airport

- Location in Pinellas County and the state of Florida
- Coordinates: 27°54′29″N 82°40′55″W
- Country: United States
- State: Florida
- County: Pinellas

Area
  - Total: 3.43 sq mi (8.88 km^{2})
  - Land: 2.83 sq mi (7.34 km^{2})
  - Water: 0.59 sq mi (1.54 km^{2})
- Elevation: 3 ft (0.91 m)

Population (2020)
  - Total: 3,607
  - Density: 1,272.6/sq mi (491.37/km^{2})
- Time zone: UTC-5 (Eastern (EST))
  - Summer (DST): UTC-4 (EDT)
- ZIP Code: 33762
- FIPS code: 12-21945
- GNIS feature ID: 2402477

Feather Sound is a census-designated place (CDP) in Pinellas County, Florida, United States. As of the 2020 census, Feather Sound had a population of 3,607. It includes the St. Petersburg-Clearwater International Airport.

== Geography ==
According to the United States Census Bureau, the CDP has a total area of 3.6 square miles (9.3 km^{2}), of which 3.0 square miles (7.8 km^{2}) is land and 0.58 square miles (1.5 km^{2}) (16.32%) is water.

== Demographics ==
Historical population
Census	Pop.	Note	%±
1990	2,690		—
2000	3,597		33.7%
2010	3,420		−4.9%
2020	3,607		5.5%

=== 2020 census ===
As of the 2020 census, Feather Sound had a population of 3,607. The median age was 47.1 years. 14.0% of residents were under the age of 18 and 22.6% of residents were 65 years of age or older. For every 100 females there were 94.1 males, and for every 100 females age 18 and over there were 92.9 males age 18 and over.

100.0% of residents lived in urban areas, while 0.0% lived in rural areas.

There were 1,903 households in Feather Sound, of which 16.3% had children under the age of 18 living in them. Of all households, 41.8% were married-couple households, 21.8% were households with a male householder and no spouse or partner present, and 29.2% were households with a female householder and no spouse or partner present. About 39.8% of all households were made up of individuals and 10.5% had someone living alone who was 65 years of age or older.

There were 2,067 housing units, of which 7.9% were vacant. The homeowner vacancy rate was 2.0% and the rental vacancy rate was 8.4%.

Racial composition as of the 2020 census
Race	Number	Percent
White	2,781	77.1%
Black or African American	125	3.5%
American Indian and Alaska Native	10	0.3%
Asian	304	8.4%
Native Hawaiian and Other Pacific Islander	0	0.0%
Some other race	92	2.6%
Two or more races	295	8.2%
Hispanic or Latino (of any race)	297	8.2%

=== 2000 census ===
As of the 2000 census, there were 3,597 people, 1,909 households, and 943 families residing in the CDP. The population density was 329.9 people/km^{2} (854 people/mi^{2}). There were 2,027 housing units at an average density of 185.9 units/km^{2} (481 units/mi^{2}). The racial makeup of the CDP was 93.86% White, 2.09% African American, 0.11% Native American, 2.53% Asian, 0.03% Pacific Islander, 0.67% from other races, and 0.72% from two or more races. Hispanic or Latino of any race were 4.06% of the population.

There were 1,909 households, out of which 15.6% had children under the age of 18 living with them, 42.9% were married couples living together, 4.5% had a female householder with no husband present, and 50.6% were non-families. 40.1% of all households were made up of individuals, and 4.1% had someone living alone who was 65 years of age or older. The average household size was 1.88 and the average family size was 2.54.

In the CDP, the population was spread out, with 13.5% under the age of 18, 6.2% from 18 to 24, 41.6% from 25 to 44, 29.9% from 45 to 64, and 8.9% who were 65 years of age or older. The median age was 39 years. For every 100 females, there were 100.1 males. For every 100 females age 18 and over, there were 99.0 males.

The median income for a household in the CDP was $71,310, and the median income for a family was $92,181. Males had a median income of $55,167 versus $40,781 for females. The per capita income for the CDP was $49,717. About 0.8% of families and 2.2% of the population were below the poverty line, including none of those under age 18 and 5.3% of those age 65 or over.
