= Belleair Bluffs, Florida =

- City
- City of Belleair Bluffs
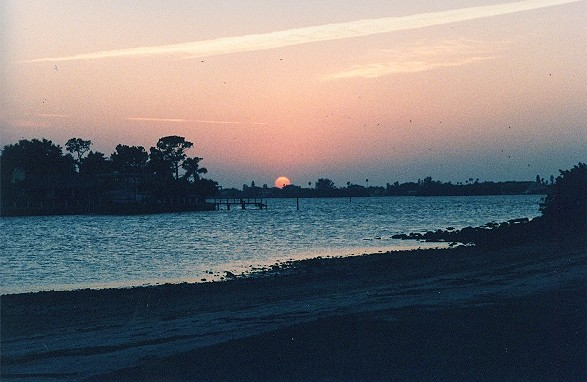
- Looking west from Belleair Bluffs's end of the Belleair Causeway toward Belleair Beach at sunset on November 3, 2006.

- Location in Pinellas County and the state of Florida
- Coordinates: 27°55′11″N 82°49′09″W
- Country: United States
- State: Florida
- County: Pinellas
- Founded: c. 1946–1947
- Incorporated: March 4, 1963

Government
  - Type: Mayor-Commission
  - Mayor: Chris Arbutine, Sr.
  - Commissioners: Karen Rafferty, David Roberts, Suzy Sofer, and Joseph Barkley III
  - City Administrator: Debra S. Sullivan
  - City Clerk: Alexis A. Silcox
  - City Attorney: Thomas J. Trask

Area
  - Total: 0.61 sq mi (1.59 km^{2})
  - Land: 0.46 sq mi (1.19 km^{2})
  - Water: 0.15 sq mi (0.39 km^{2})
- Elevation: 46 ft (14 m)

Population (2020)
  - Total: 2,311
  - Density: 5,018.7/sq mi (1,937.74/km^{2})
- Time zone: UTC-5 (Eastern (EST))
  - Summer (DST): UTC-4 (EDT)
- ZIP code: 33770
- Area code: 727
- FIPS code: 12-05125
- GNIS feature ID: 2403841
- Website: www.belleairbluffs.org

Belleair Bluffs is a city in Pinellas County, Florida, United States. It is part of the Tampa–St. Petersburg–Clearwater Metropolitan Statistical Area, more commonly known as the Tampa Bay Area. The City of Belleair Bluffs was officially incorporated as a municipality on March 4, 1963. The population was 2,311 at the 2020 census.

== Geography ==
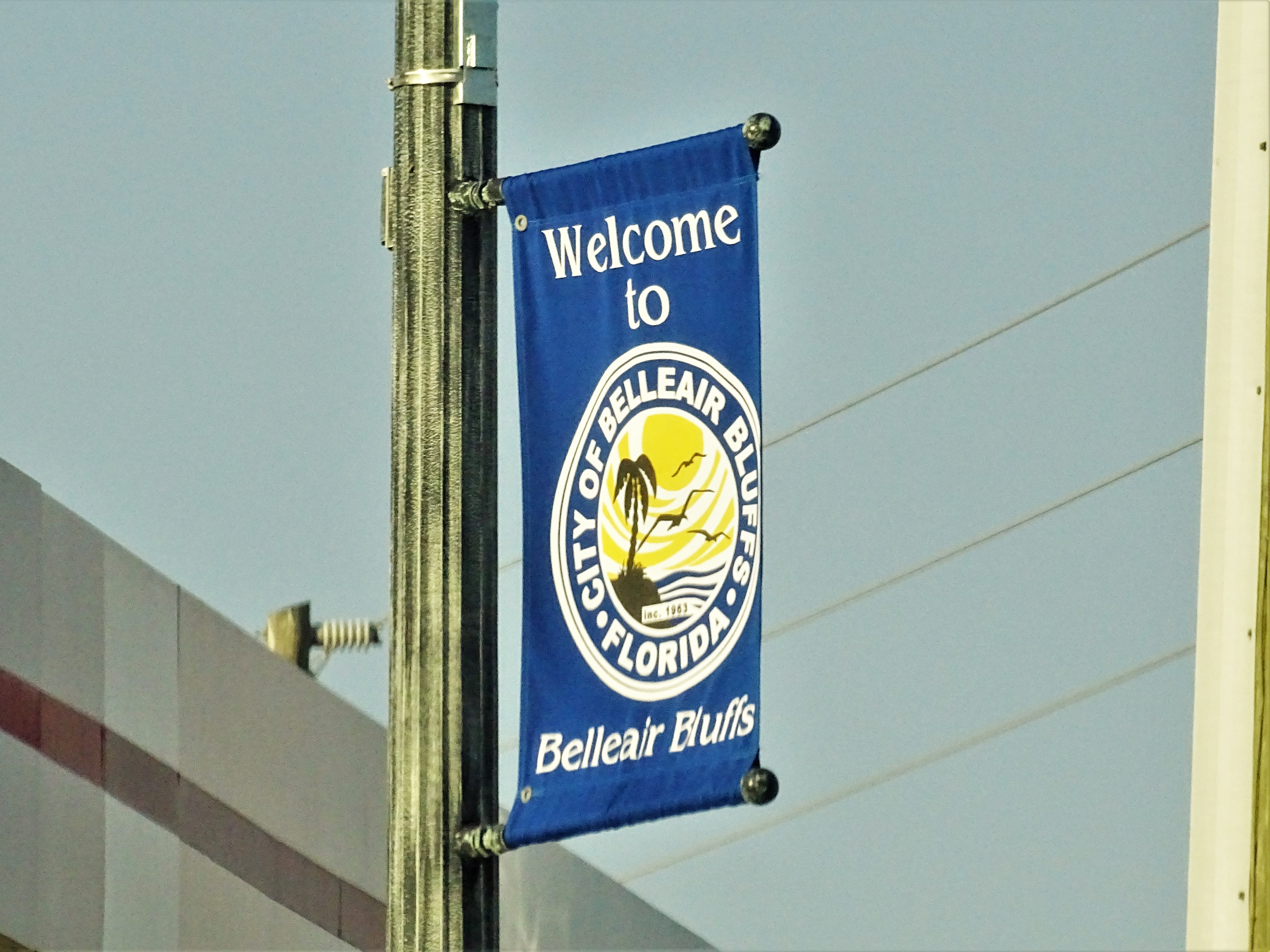
A welcoming banner with the city's seal on it.

According to the United States Census Bureau, the city has a total area of 0.6 square miles (1.6 km^{2}), of which 0.5 square miles (1.3 km^{2}) is land and 0.2 square miles (0.52 km^{2}) (25.40%) is water.

=== Climate ===
The climate in this area is characterized by hot, humid summers and generally mild winters. According to the Köppen climate classification, the City of Belleair Bluffs has a humid subtropical climate zone (Cfa).

== Demographics ==
Historical population
Census	Pop.	Note	%±
1970	1,910		—
1980	2,522		32.0%
1990	2,128		−15.6%
2000	2,243		5.4%
2010	2,031		−9.5%
2020	2,311		13.8%
U.S. Decennial Census

=== Racial and ethnic composition ===
Belleair Bluffs racial composition (Hispanics excluded from racial categories) (NH = Non-Hispanic)
Race	Pop 2010	Pop 2020	% 2010	% 2020
White (NH)	1,868	2,015	91.97%	87.19%
Black or African American (NH)	16	51	0.79%	2.21%
Native American or Alaska Native (NH)	4	4	0.20%	0.17%
Asian (NH)	26	30	1.28%	1.30%
Pacific Islander or Native Hawaiian (NH)	2	1	0.10%	0.04%
Some other race (NH)	3	12	0.15%	0.52%
Two or more races/Multiracial (NH)	13	83	0.64%	3.59%
Hispanic or Latino (any race)	99	115	4.87%	4.98%
Total	2,031	2,311	100.00%	100.00%

=== 2020 census ===
As of the 2020 census, Belleair Bluffs had a population of 2,311. The median age was 57.7 years. 12.0% of residents were under the age of 18, and 34.9% of residents were 65 years of age or older. For every 100 females there were 89.0 males, and for every 100 females age 18 and over there were 87.2 males age 18 and over.

100.0% of residents lived in urban areas, while 0.0% lived in rural areas.

There were 1,255 households in Belleair Bluffs, of which 16.6% had children under the age of 18 living in them. Of all households, 35.3% were married-couple households, 21.9% were households with a male householder and no spouse or partner present, and 35.7% were households with a female householder and no spouse or partner present. About 43.4% of all households were made up of individuals and 23.2% had someone living alone who was 65 years of age or older.

There were 1,509 housing units, of which 16.8% were vacant. The homeowner vacancy rate was 1.3% and the rental vacancy rate was 9.6%.

According to the United States Census Bureau's 2020 American Community Survey 5-year estimates, there were 564 families residing in the city.

=== 2010 census ===
As of the 2010 United States census, there were 2,031 people, 1,185 households, and 557 families residing in the city.

=== 2000 census ===
As of the 2000 United States census, there were 2,243 people in 1,327 households, including 609 families, in the city. The population density was 4,857.7 inhabitants per square mile (1,875.6/km^{2}). There were 1,503 housing units at an average density of 3,255.0 per square mile (1,256.8/km^{2}). The racial makeup of the city was 97.95% White, 0.18% African American, 0.98% Asian, 0.18% from other races, and 0.71% from two or more races. Hispanic or Latino of any race were 1.25%.

Of the 1,327 households in 2000, 9.9% had children under the age of 18 living with them, 37.9% were married couples living together, 6.0% had a female householder with no husband present, and 54.1% were non-families. 48.5% of households were one person and 29.3% were one person aged 65 or older. The average household size was 1.69 and the average family size was 2.34.

The age distribution in 2000 was 8.8% under the age of 18, 3.5% from 18 to 24, 18.2% from 25 to 44, 25.4% from 45 to 64, and 44.1% 65 or older. The median age was 60 years. For every 100 females, there were 76.2 males. For every 100 females age 18 and over, there were 74.4 males.

In 2000, the median household income was $32,528 and the median family income was $48,421. Males had a median income of $40,987 versus $25,658 for females. The per capita income for the city was $31,329. About 1.2% of families and 6.1% of the population were below the poverty line, including none of those under age 18 and 7.7% of those age 65 or over.
