= Belleair Beach, Florida =

- City
- City of Belleair Beach
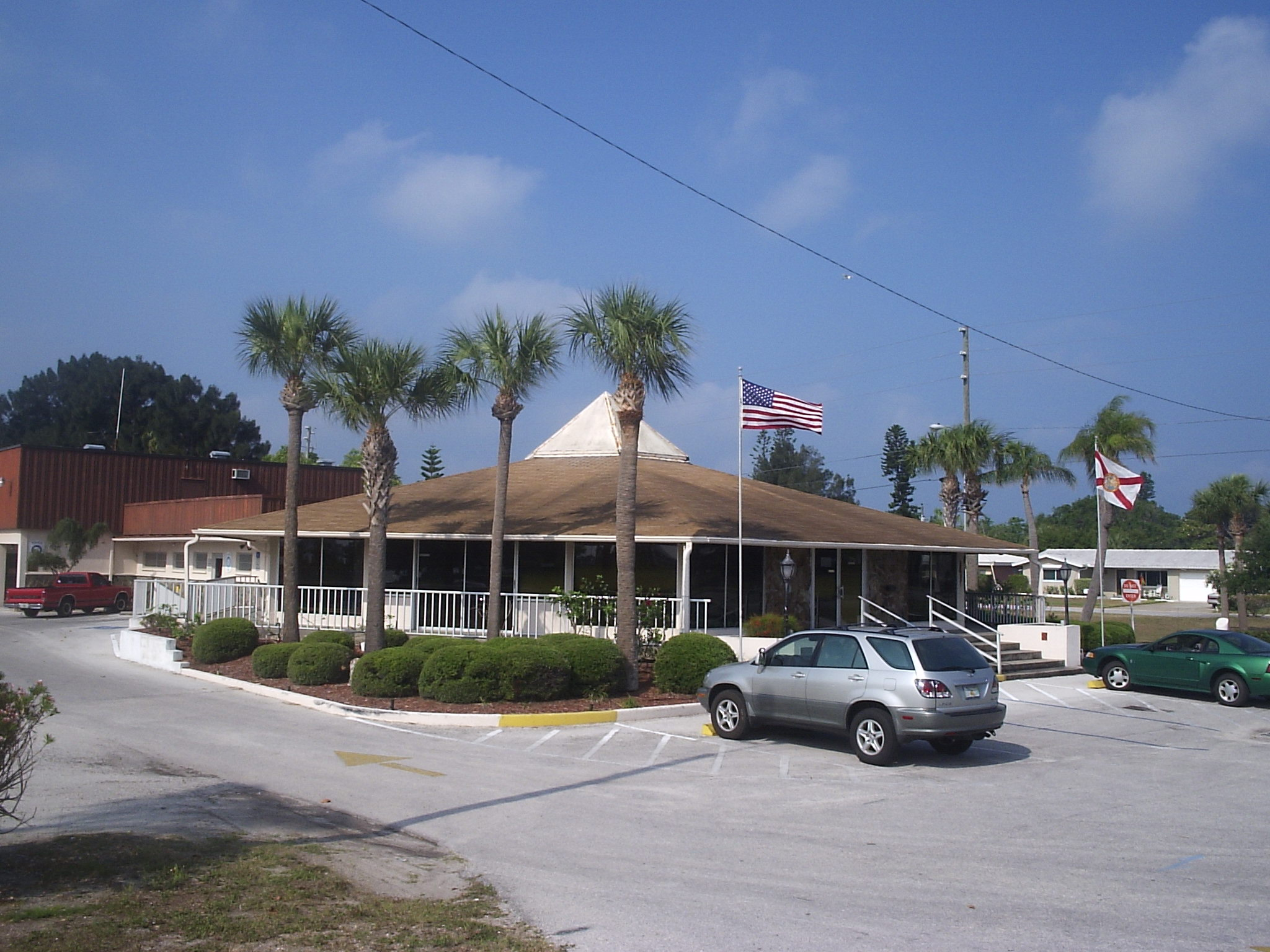
- Belleair Beach City Hall, May 2006

- Location in Pinellas County and the state of Florida
- Coordinates: 27°55′28″N 82°50′11″W
- Country: United States
- State: Florida
- County: Pinellas
- Founded: c. 1946–1947
- Incorporated: March 16, 1950

Government
  - Type: Council-Manager
  - Mayor: Michael "Dave" Gattis
  - Vice Mayor: Lloyd Roberts
  - Council Members: Todd Harper, Frank Bankard, Jody Shirley, and Kimberly "Kim" Shaw Elliott
  - City Manager: Kyle Riefler
  - City Clerk: Kathy Thornsberry

Area
  - Total: 1.90 sq mi (4.93 km^{2})
  - Land: 0.47 sq mi (1.23 km^{2})
  - Water: 1.42 sq mi (3.69 km^{2})
- Elevation: 0 ft (0 m)

Population (2020)
  - Total: 1,633
  - Density: 3,425.7/sq mi (1,322.66/km^{2})
- Time zone: UTC-5 (Eastern (EST))
  - Summer (DST): UTC-4 (EDT)
- ZIP codes: 33785-33786
- Area code: 727
- FIPS code: 12-05100
- GNIS feature ID: 2403840
- Website: www.cityofbelleairbeach.com

Belleair Beach is a city in Pinellas County, Florida, United States. It is part of Tampa–St. Petersburg–Clearwater Metropolitan Statistical Area, more commonly known as the Tampa Bay Area. The population was 1,633 at the 2020 census.

== History ==
Prior to the 1940s, the current city limits on Sand Key where Belleair Beach is located was uninhabited land without any settlers. The then deserted part of the island where the city now sits was temporarily used as a bombing range by the US military during WWII by military pilots from MacDill Field & other air bases used by the US Army Air Forces that now function as Tampa International Airport (formerly Drew Army Airfield) and St. Pete–Clearwater International Airport (formerly Pinellas Army Air Field). After the war ended, major development of the land began to be platted around 1946 through 1947. The City of Bellair Beach was officially incorporated as a municipality on March 16, 1950.

== Geography ==
According to the United States Census Bureau, the city has a total area of 1.7 square miles (4.5 km^{2}), of which 0.46 square miles (1.2 km^{2}) is land and 1.2 square miles (3.2 km^{2}) (72.12%) is water.

=== Climate ===
The climate in this area is characterized by hot, humid summers, and generally mild winters. According to the Köppen climate classification, the City of Belleair Beach has a humid subtropical climate zone (Cfa).

== Demographics ==
Historical population
Census	Pop.	Note	%±
1960	563		—
1970	952		69.1%
1980	1,643		72.6%
1990	2,070		26.0%
2000	1,751		−15.4%
2010	1,560		−10.9%
2020	1,633		4.7%
U.S. Decennial Census

=== Racial and ethnic composition ===
Belleair Beach racial composition (Hispanics excluded from racial categories) (NH = Non-Hispanic)
Race	Pop 2010	Pop 2020	% 2010	% 2020
White (NH)	1,445	1,414	92.63%	86.59%
Black or African American (NH)	6	10	0.38%	0.61%
Native American or Alaska Native (NH)	1	4	0.06%	0.24%
Asian (NH)	16	52	1.03%	3.18%
Pacific Islander or Native Hawaiian (NH)	0	0	0.00%	0.00%
Some other race (NH)	4	4	0.26%	0.24%
Two or more races/Multiracial (NH)	30	60	1.92%	3.67%
Hispanic or Latino (any race)	58	89	3.71%	5.45%
Total	1,560	1,633		

=== 2020 census ===
As of the 2020 census, Belleair Beach had a population of 1,633. The median age was 58.3 years. 11.1% of residents were under the age of 18 and 35.0% of residents were 65 years of age or older. For every 100 females there were 97.9 males, and for every 100 females age 18 and over there were 95.8 males age 18 and over.

100.0% of residents lived in urban areas, while 0.0% lived in rural areas.

There were 755 households in Belleair Beach, of which 18.5% had children under the age of 18 living in them. Of all households, 60.4% were married-couple households, 15.1% were households with a male householder and no spouse or partner present, and 19.3% were households with a female householder and no spouse or partner present. About 24.5% of all households were made up of individuals and 11.5% had someone living alone who was 65 years of age or older.

There were 1,147 housing units, of which 34.2% were vacant. The homeowner vacancy rate was 2.3% and the rental vacancy rate was 21.4%.

According to the 2020 American Community Survey 5-year estimates, there were 444 families residing in the city.

=== 2010 census ===
As of the 2010 United States census, there were 1,560 people, 678 households, and 481 families residing in the city.

=== 2000 census ===
As of the census of 2000, there were 1,751 people, 825 households, and 545 families residing in the city. The population density was 3,037.2 inhabitants per square mile (1,172.7/km^{2}). There were 1,144 housing units at an average density of 1,984.3 per square mile (766.1/km^{2}). The racial makeup of the city was 96.74% White, 0.23% African American, 0.17% Native American, 1.37% Asian, 0.11% Pacific Islander, 0.34% from other races, and 1.03% from two or more races. Hispanic or Latino of any race were 2.86% of the population.

In 2000, there were 825 households, out of which 13.7% had children under the age of 18 living with them, 59.9% were married couples living together, 3.9% had a female householder with no husband present, and 33.9% were non-families. 26.4% of all households were made up of individuals, and 11.9% had someone living alone who was 65 years of age or older. The average household size was 2.12 and the average family size was 2.54.

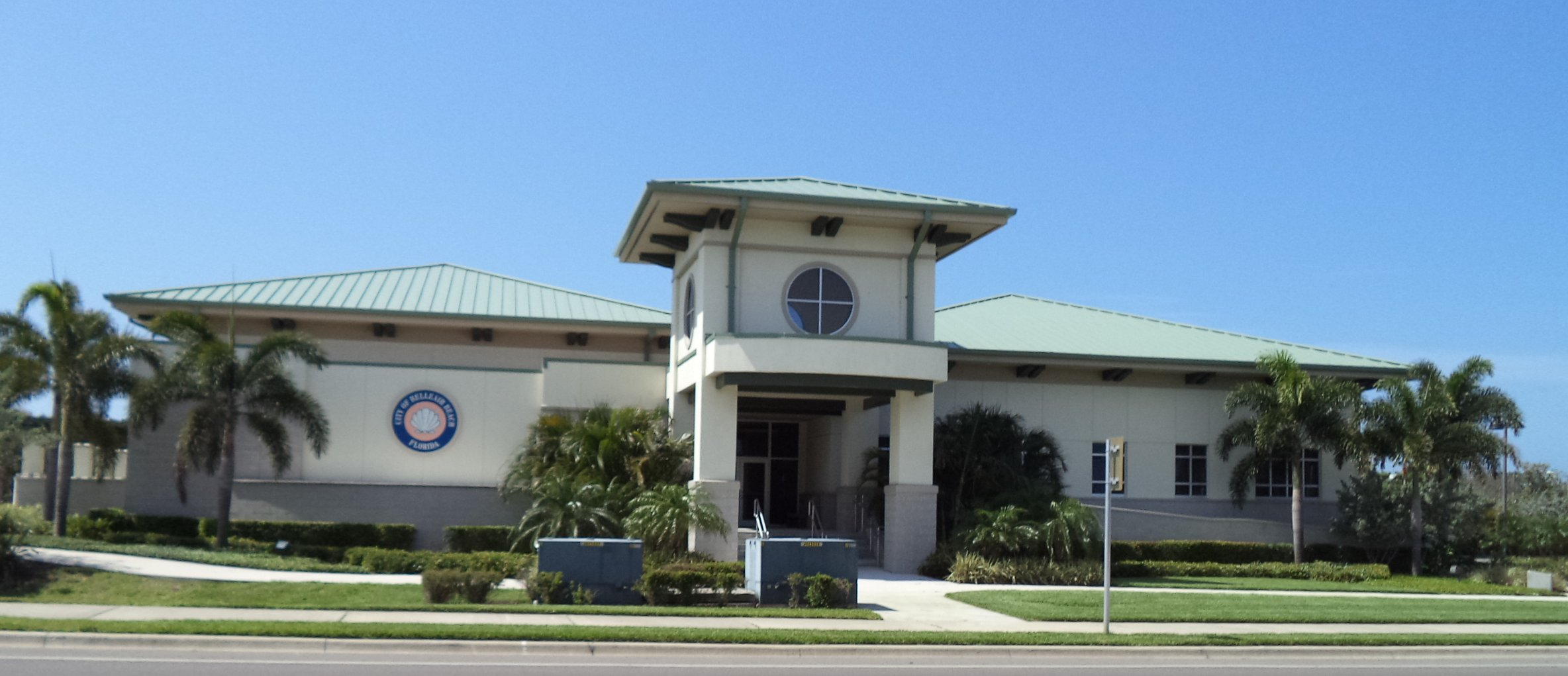
Belleair Beach Community Center

In 2000, in the city, the population was spread out, with 11.9% under the age of 18, 4.0% from 18 to 24, 20.0% from 25 to 44, 38.3% from 45 to 64, and 25.8% who were 65 years of age or older. The median age was 52 years. For every 100 females, there were 101.0 males. For every 100 females age 18 and over, there were 98.2 males.

In 2000, the median income for a household in the city was $63,529, and the median income for a family was $90,282. Males had a median income of $56,354 versus $46,583 for females. The per capita income for the city was $61,569. About 4.0% of families and 7.8% of the population were below the poverty line, including 10.6% of those under age 18 and 2.4% of those age 65 or over.

== Government ==
The City of Belleair Beach operates under a Council-Manager form of government. The City Council is the legislative body of the city and is empowered by the charter to make policy which is then communicated to the City Manager for implementation. The City Council is composed of a Mayor and six councilmembers who are elected at large on a nonpartisan basis, which includes the Vice Mayor.
